= St James' Anglican Church, Morpeth =

St James' Anglican Church
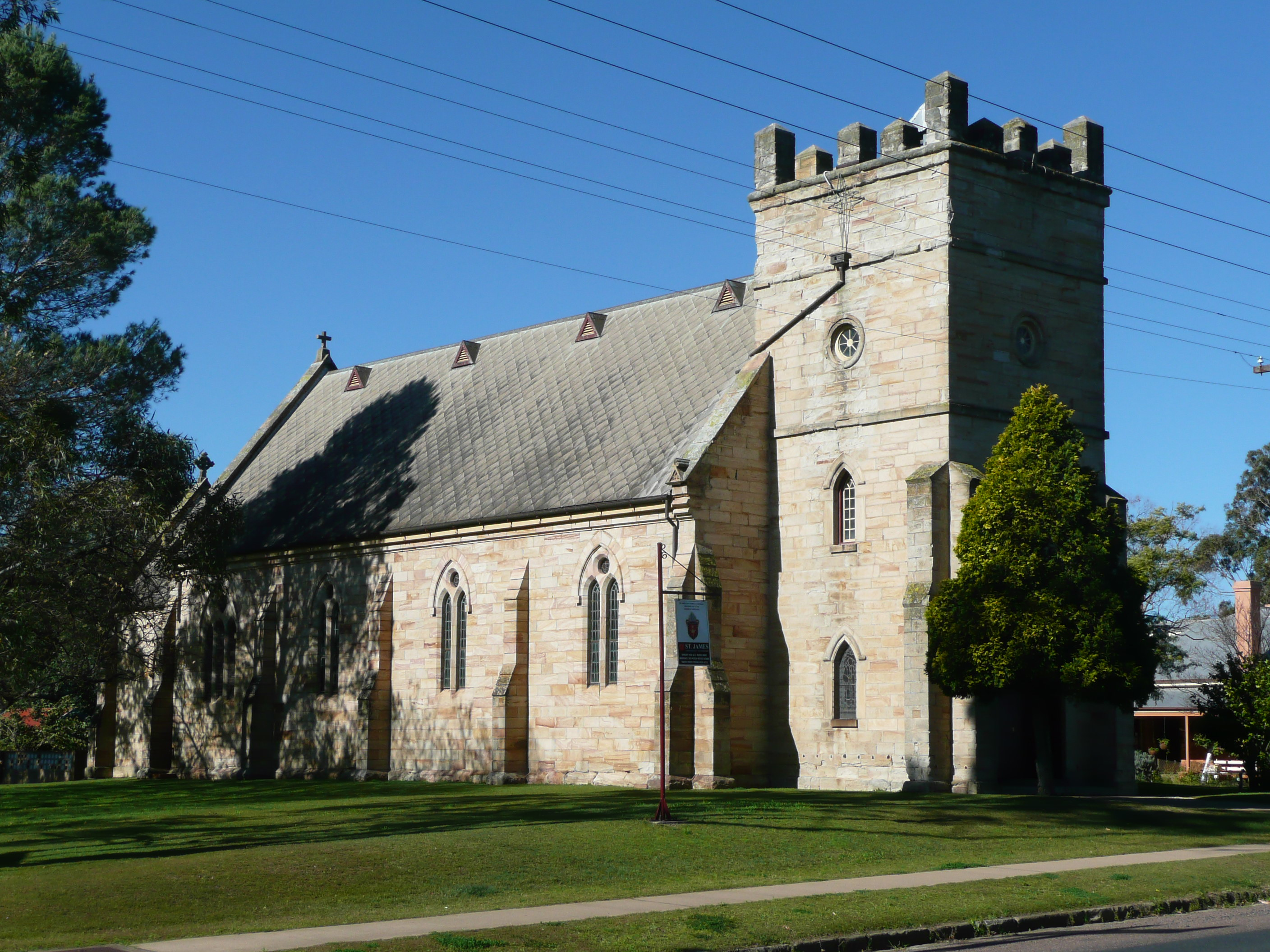
- St James' Anglican Church, pictured in 2009

- Location in New South Wales
- 32°43′38″S 151°37′26″E
- Location: 19 Tank Street, Morpeth, City of Maitland, New South Wales
- Country: Australia
- Denomination: Anglican
- Website: stjamesmorpeth.org.au

History
- Status: Church
- Founded: January 1837
- Founder: Edward Close Jnr.
- Dedication: Saint James
- Consecrated: 1840 by Bishop William Broughton

Architecture
- Functional status: Active
- Architects: Edward Charles Close (attributed) (stage one); Edmund Blacket (stage two); John Horbury Hunt (stage three)
- Architectural type: Church
- Style: Old Colonial Gothick Picturesque
- Years built: 1837–1875

Specifications
- Materials: Sydney sandstone; Compressed fibrous cement shingles

Administration
- Province: New South Wales
- Diocese: Newcastle
- Parish: Morpeth

New South Wales Heritage Register
- Official name: St James' Anglican Church Group; Saint James Anglican Church
- Type: State heritage (complex / group)
- Designated: 27 January 2017
- Reference no.: 1979
- Type: Church
- Category: Religion
- Builders: Edward Charles Close; James Sherwood

St James' Anglican Church is a heritage-listed Anglican church precinct at 19 Tank Street, Morpeth, City of Maitland, New South Wales, Australia. The original design was attributed to Edward Charles Close, with later additions by Edmund Blacket and John Horbury Hunt and built from 1837 to 1875 by Edward Charles Close and James Sherwood. The precinct also includes the St. James' rectory and parish hall (formerly schoolhouse). The property is vested in the trustees of church property for the Diocese of Newcastle. It was added to the New South Wales State Heritage Register on 27 January 2017.

== History ==
=== Pre- and post-contact aboriginal custodianship ===
The place now called Morpeth, situated on the Hunter River some 29 water miles from Newcastle, appears to have been occupied by the Wonnarua (or Wanaruah) people, and to have been known to them as Illulong, Illalaung or Illullaung. They may have given the title Waywerryghein to the landing place that later evolved into Queen's Wharf, while the ridge to the south of the river may have been Baybeg. The Wonnarua seem to have called the river Coonanbarra. The site of West Maitland may have been called Boyen, while that of East Maitland may have been called Cooloogooloogheit.

=== European settlement ===
The European settlement ultimately called Morpeth was privately founded in the early 1820s by Lieutenant Edward Charles Close. Morpeth, or Green Hills as it was then known, was at the time at the head of navigation for ocean-going vessels from Sydney and other ports proceeding up-river from Newcastle; and although vessels of lighter draught could navigate as far as Wallis Plains (also called Molly Morgan's, now known as Maitland), the distance by land was so much shorter than that by water as to give Green Hills the advantage as a landing place. Even after the completion of a road between Newcastle and Wallis Plains, the river remained the main artery of communication. Morpeth was the major port of the Hunter Region, New England and North-Western NSW. Until the 1880s it also served the Darling Downs in Queensland. The great majority of goods and passengers were handled at Morpeth, with the local customs house playing an important role. Wool was sometimes despatched direct to England, while large numbers of immigrants also passed through the port on their way up-country. Not until the introduction in 1889 of differential railway freight rates, which from 1901 deliberately made it cheaper to send wool to Sydney than to Morpeth or Newcastle, did the port begin to decline. This placated Sydney merchants; undercut coastal shipping; and helped to pay for the very expensive Homebush to Waratah railway (now part of the Main Northern line).

Lieutenant Close, a veteran of the Peninsular War of 1807–1814, was born in Rangamatti, Bengal, on 12 March 1790. He and his mother some seven years later removed to England, where at the age of 18 he joined the 48th (Northamptonshire) Regiment of Foot to defend his country against Napoleon Bonaparte. Having survived several significant engagements, including the great battles of Albuera and Talavera, in 1817 Close arrived in Sydney with a detachment of his regiment. In 1821, Close decided to sell his Commission and was promised 1,200 acres of land at the Illalaung, or Green Hills (now Morpeth).

Morpeth was a private town and long remained so. The failure by Sir Thomas Brisbane to reserve the site for a government town was condemned by John Dunmore Lang. In assuming control of so valuable a site, as well as much other land besides, Close had undoubtedly made the most of his military connections. These came under strain when, as a magistrate, he helped investigate the alleged murder of Aboriginal prisoners by a mounted force under the command of Lieutenant Nathaniel Lowe. Close so frustrated the enquiry that the Governor, Sir Ralph Darling, with whom Close had already clashed when Darling had tried to resume the site of Morpeth for inadequate compensation, suggested that Close resign as a magistrate. Close, much offended, acted on the suggestion, but maintained an undiminished reputation throughout the colony; yet his role in the Lowe affair, one of considerable importance in the legal history of NSW, and particularly with regard to the question of the rights of Aboriginal people before the law, pending further research must remain controversial.

The first subdivision (1834) of the township of Morpeth, situated on an east–west ridge overlooking the river, allowed Close to donate land on both sides of the intersection of High Street and Tank Street. Here would eventually be built a church, rectory (in those days often called a parsonage), stone-built parish schoolhouse and schoolteacher's house. The church and parish schoolhouse, sited so as to form a focal point and entry for the embryonic township when viewed from the approach roads from all four cardinal directions, and no doubt to enable the identification of the township much in the style of an English village, were paid for by Close, while the rectory was partly paid for by him. Conrad Martens' 1841 sketch of Morpeth demonstrates the success of Close's vision. Close was himself a capable artist whose paintings and sketches, once attributed to Sophia Campbell, are held in the National Library of Australia. By way of preparation, Close had built a two-storied temporary schoolhouse-cum-chapel some little distance to the east. Not long after the establishment in 1862 of the government-sponsored Morpeth National School, the parish school closed; the building was then used as the parish hall.

The local population was small, hardly requiring a church; Close, however, believed that a village must have a place of worship. In addition, he had a very personal reason for the establishment of a local place of worship: the satisfaction of an oath, made during the Battle of Albuera (May 1811) with his comrades falling on every side, that if his life were spared he would one day build a Church to the Glory of God. In January 1837 the foundation stone was laid by Edward Close Jnr., the 13-year-old son of E. C. Close. It is probable that the building was in fact designed by E. C. Close, who as military engineer at Newcastle had undertaken some important harbour and other works, including the designing of a house for the keeper of the coal-fired harbour beacon. Close's skill in designing this extraordinary structure, reminiscent of his place of birth, proves his architectural skill, while his clear pride and interest in St. James' is suggestive. It is, however, also possible that the church was designed by Lieutenant Thomas Owen, who like Close had experience as Government engineer at Newcastle, and had designed St Thomas' Anglican Church (1828) at Port Macquarie. In December 1840 the church was consecrated by Bishop William Broughton under the patronage of St. James. By this time Close had dedicated land some distance to the south of the church for use as the St. James' graveyard. This was later expanded to provide for Roman Catholic, Presbyterian, Methodist and non-denominational burials.

In 1848 Bishop William Tyrrell, first Bishop of Newcastle, arrived from England via Sydney, and took advantage of Close's ready hospitality in using Morpeth as a base for his first efforts within the newly created Diocese of Newcastle. So convenient did he find the locality, and so superior did he think the modest St. James' to his Cathedral, the larger but tumbledown convict-built Christ Church Cathedral high on the hill at Newcastle, that he chose Morpeth for his place of residence, effectively making it the centre of the diocese. This centrality persisted during Tyrrell's lifetime, as it was to do until the partial completion of the first stage of Christ Church Cathedral in 1902 and the 1920s relocation of the bishops to Newcastle.

Tyrrell initially lived in the St. James' Rectory; and it may have been at this time that, as argued by Stuart Read of the Garden Historical Society of Australia, he planted in its grounds a still-extant camellia bush from John Macarthur's Camden Park. Tyrrell later moved to E.C. Close's nearby home, called Closebourne, renamed as the Bishop's Palace and afterwards as Bishopscourt. In the 1890s, Bishop George Henry Stanton planted an avenue of trees providing a visual link between the house and the church. The rectory grounds originally included a paddock for the parson's horse. Much of this area was later sold, considerably reducing the extent of the property.

Close's influence on St. James' was reflected in other ways also, such as the dedication of a prominent marble wall monument to his friend Captain Rinaldo Sheberras (originally Sceberras) of the 80th Regiment of Foot (Staffordshire Volunteers), one of several officers and other ranks who fell in capturing one of the black standards of the Nihang (Akali) Sikh warriors at the Battle of Ferozeshah during the Anglo-Sikh war of 1845-1846. This standard now hangs in Lichfield Cathedral, Staffordshire. Close most probably contributed to the wall monument, and is known to have bestowed the parish schoolhouse (1849), now the parish hall.

The church as originally built was too small to accommodate a growing population, and was also less than suitable for the High Church ecclesiology to which Bishop Tyrrell subscribed. This led to the engagement in the early 1860s of architect Edmund Blacket, who designed a chancel and vestry, joined to the existing nave via a high chancel arch. This work, including the introduction of a carved stone pulpit and font, both designed by Blacket, was completed in 1862. The sandstone pulpit, a replica of the 13th-century example in Beaulieu Abbey, Hampshire, where Tyrrell had formerly been parish priest, was carved by Maitland stonemason Daniel Yeates from Blacket's copy of measured drawings in 'Weale's Quarterly Papers' (1844), an English journal. Joan Kerr describes it as "really something special", and "one of the glories of the church". Like Blacket's later design for the Pulpit of St Thomas' Anglican Church, North Sydney, a variant on that of St. James', it was corbelled, in this case out of the east wall of the nave. As distinct from that of St. Thomas', the pulpit of St. James' was able to be entered only from the vestry, a quite unusual feature. In this, as well as in its exquisite detail, the pulpit demonstrates the Anglo-Catholic aspirations of Tyrrell, as well as the very close interest that this exceedingly busy and resilient man took in St. James'. The Yeates family was also responsible for the font and pulpit of St. Paul's West Maitland. In 1864, pews of local cedar, with elaborately carved ends, were installed, replacing the original enclosed pews. The bench-ends are of some interest, being typical of Blacket's earlier practice, as by the 1870s he was already beginning to embrace much simpler pew designs. The pulpit, font and pews also demonstrate Blacket's considerable interest in furniture design as a reflection of his preferred High Church ecclesiology, an ideal to which he was able to give full expression in the "High Church" Diocese of Newcastle, as distinct from the constraints of the Diocese of Sydney, always predominantly "low church" but in those days still recognisably Anglican.

In 1871–1872, the stained glass East Window, replacing plain glass, was installed in memory of E. C. Close. Designed by Bishop Tyrrell, it illustrates the central beliefs of catholic Christianity. Made in England and paid for by local citizens, its five columns display scenes from the Last Supper, Crucifixion, and Resurrection. A rose window above depicts Christus Panocrator: Christ All-powerful. In 1877 a William Davidson pipe organ was installed on the northern side of the nave, adjacent to the chancel arch. In the 1940s, the organ was relocated to the rear of the nave, while hand operation was replaced by an electric motor. In 2004 the instrument was renovated by Peter Jewkes, the facade pipes being replaced.

In 1874 a fire caused major damage to the roof, which had retained its timber shingles. John Horbury Hunt, who had previously collaborated with Blacket and understood his work, was engaged to oversee the repairs. Hunt not only reconstructed the roof and replaced the timber shingles in slate, but also rebuilt the sandstone nave walls, removing the internal brick lining and raising the walls by two courses. The increased height was supported by the modification of the buttresses from octagonal to square form. Hunt's restraint makes his work at St. James' quite atypical of his wider church practice. Perhaps by way of compensation, he excelled himself in his design for the hammerbeam truss roof, which as befits a river port rather resembles a ship's hull. Hunt appears also to have designed the picket fence by which both rectory and church were protected.

The completion of the roof, described by Professor A. P. Elkin as "a thrilling conception and a most remarkable feature", did much to alter St. James' from a rustic place of worship to a Parish Church in the traditional sense. The roof design, which has been described as a radical departure from his customary unadorned "as from saw" construction, appears to have been intended to impress Bishop Tyrrell, and was inspired by that of St. Wendreda's, March, Cambridgeshire, although Hunt did not seek to replicate its exact detail. Hunt also designed hammerbeam truss roofs for All Saints', Hunters Hill and for the Cathedral of Christ the King, Grafton, although these are not so delicately executed as that at St. James'. The nave was dedicated in December 1875. The completion of the works was commemorated in the relaying of the foundation stone. This ceremony, like the first, was undertaken by Edward Close Jnr. After the death of Bishop Tyrrell in 1879, a brass lectern in the church, modelled on the Eagle of St. John's gospel, was dedicated to his memory.

In the Church grounds is an oak tree, grown from an acorn acquired in Hyde Park, London, by a Mr Hill (probably Private Lyall George Hill, Australian Imperial Force, enlisted 5 June 1916), a local resident. In 1916, the gift of the Eales family of encaustic tiles from Duckenfield Park House, demolished in that year, transformed the floor of the Nave. In 1924 the narthex, or porch, was tiled in a different pattern. In 1927 a new altar was installed, further reflecting the High Church ideal, while in 1939 the roof slates were replaced with asbestos tiles and some rafters were replaced.

When in the 1960s the picket fence partially collapsed, it was removed and not replaced. In the early 1970s a City of Westminster gas lamp was brought to Morpeth and installed just outside the entry to the church. In 1972 a columbarium was built, despite the proximity of the cemetery.

In 1989, the church suffered major structural damage from the 1989 Newcastle earthquake. Sydney architects H. O. Woodhouse and Danks Pty Ltd oversaw the repairs, completed in 1994. It was at this time, too, that most of the memorial plaques were removed to the baptistery in the north-west corner of the church. Statues at the western end of the nave, carved by Englebert Piccolrautz, an Austrian woodcarver, are understood to date from 2005.

Joan Kerr assesses the church as having 'Close's tower, Blacket's east end and Hunt's nave, quite harmoniously combined because of the continuous use of sandstone and the emulative English ambitions of the parish'.

== Description ==
=== Church ===
The church is a modestly sized stone-built building executed in what has been described as an Old Colonial Gothick Picturesque style. The building was completed in three stages: the first, for which Edward Charles Close is thought to have been responsible, was completed in 1840; the second, built in 1862, was designed by Edmund Blacket; the third, designed by John Horbury Hunt, was constructed in 1875. The siting of the building at the crest of the ridge running east–west to the south of the Hunter River renders it visible across a wide area on both sides of the waterway, and assists in defining it as a structure both geographically prominent and physically substantial. The unfenced grounds, which are used for parish and community functions, are characterised by sweeping lawns and mature trees.

The sandstone building presents a simple form of a gabled nave with a chancel in the east and a square tower in the west. The chancel has a vestry on the southern side. The tower, the oldest element of the church, is visible across a wide area, and displays less detail, with simple lancet (pointed arch) windows to the first two levels, and a small roundel window to the third and highest level. The tower castellations conceal a steeply pitched roof, from which district views are available. The lowest two levels of the tower are supported by undecorated stone buttresses. The lancet windows are simply highlighted with stone hood moulds, and the small wheel windows to the upper tower are encircled with stone mouldings. Two stone string courses add a simple horizontal detail to the upper tower, and highlight the roundel windows. The main entry door is a large timber door set into a pointed segmental arch opening, also with a hood mould. The nave, and smaller projecting eastern chancel, are more decorative in their detail, while keeping the same character as the tower. The nave is broken into four bays by simple stone buttresses. Each of the western three bays displays a double lancet window and a rudimentary plate tracery motif of a small circular piercing above. The eastern bay, which coincides with the original location of the organ and choir stalls, has a triple lancet window on each side, with a quatrefoil window above. The lancet windows at each location are positioned under an equilateral pointed stone arch, with simple hood mould complete with a cube form label stop.

The parapeted gable roof, covered in compressed fibrous cement shingles, has small gabled roof vents – one for each bay – near the ridge line. The eastern parapet is topped with a cross finial, and the skew stones of the parapet are detailed with a trefoil carving. The chancel continues the parapeted gable form of the nave, with cross finial and skew stones, however the eastern end is where the Gothic decoration of the exterior is most notable. The large stained glass window sits within an elaborate stone tracery frame housing five windows at its base, surmounted by a carved rose window motif and incorporating numerous modulated trefoil and several sexfoil motifs (six leaves radiating from a common centre). The large window is framed over the top with a hood mould, but here has carved label stops.

The small vestry to the southern side sits snugly in the internal corner junction of the nave and chancel. The repetitive detail of buttressing, parapeted gable, cross finial and carved skew stones on the small size of the vestry form make this section of the church appear elaborately detailed. The pointed arch entry with hood mould and carved label stops sits below a small equilateral arched window in the gable. An elaborate window on the eastern side of the vestry is of stone tracery within a segmental arch opening. A strong hood mould with carved label stops highlights the opening. The two window bays are carved in an ogee arch form with a trefoil head. While the source of the sandstone is unknown, that used in the original building at least may have come from a nearby quarry, one known to have supplied good quality stone for several local structures. It is quite possible that the stone employed in the subsequent stages, if not for the initial element, may have been cut at Ravensfield near Farley. Stone from this quarry was used to build Aberglassyn House in the 1840s. In his 1915 survey of building and ornamental stones, R. T. Baker, curator at the Sydney Technological Museum, described the Ravensfield sandstone as "amongst the best in the State", being excellent for carving purposes.

The stone is a fine ashlar block, sparrow pecked with a margin, much more distinct and refined on Blacket's 1862 sections than on Hunt's 1875 nave or the 1840 tower. Despite this, close observation of the detail in the 1840 tower and the 1862 chancel and vestry brings new understanding to the detail that Hunt employed in his 1875 redesigning of the nave, skillfully merging the two styles displayed on either end of the structure to produce a homogeneous whole.

=== Rectory ===
St. James' rectory is a Victorian Georgian-style, sandstock brick-built dwelling with high ceilings and cedar joinery. Located just south of the church, it is a simple symmetrical structure with a steeply pitched metal roof with prominent dormers. It has wide, all-round verandahs, originally paved in flagstones, now obscured by concrete. The face brick is relieved by french doors with shutters, providing both security and regulation of ventilation as necessary.

Plantings screen the rectory from an increasingly busy Tank Street. A freestanding weatherboard garage and a freestanding brick-built studio with metal roof are located in the rectory yard. The garage, associated with an asphalt driveway and carriage sweep, has little heritage significance, while the studio (formerly the laundry and bathroom) is contemporaneous with the rectory. The grounds, characterised by lawns, mature trees and flowering shrubs, are unfenced.

=== Parish hall ===
St. James parish hall is a simple, symmetrical sandstone structure with a belfry over the central entry; simply formed window apertures; and a substantial early 1980s addition at rear. High Street separates the hall from the remainder of the St. James' Group. The unfenced grounds are characterised by lawns and shrubs.

=== Condition ===
The church was reported to be generally in fair condition as at 10 June 2016, although some of the sandstone, which has in places been degraded by salt damp, movement, and general weathering, is in poor condition. There is also notable biological growth on the southern and eastern elevations. Weathering of the sandstone at the tower parapet is noticeably advanced. The sandstone has also previously been subject to the installation of Knapen tubes. Developed in England in the early 20th century, this form of treatment for rising damp was introduced into Australia in the late 1960s, during which decade it was extensively installed in public and private masonry buildings. In the case of St. James', as for so many buildings, the Knapen tubes failed in their purpose, and their installation and removal has entailed damage to the stone by way of penetrations.

A structural assessment of the church, undertaken in 2012, addressed minor foundation movements due to reactive clay soil; roof movement due to wind action and the 1989 and 1994 earthquakes; rusting iron window frames; and significant salt damage and potential damage to masonry. Some areas of Portland cement-rich mortar, the use of which has accelerated deterioration of the sandstone, are also evident. The fabric of the church nonetheless maintains its historic integrity.

The rectory, conserved in the early 1990s, stands in good condition, and is well-maintained. The grounds, too, which feature some ornamental plantings, are well maintained, as is the freestanding studio (former laundry).

The hall, to which additions were made in the early 1980s, stands in fair condition. The original element of the parish hall has in many places been affected by damp. Portland cement-rich mortar has been used in some areas, leading to further damp problems through capillary action aided by plant encroachment into sub-floor ventilators. As a result of historic ground movement, window apertures are out of true, their casement windows (1920s) having been designed and executed to suit.

The group retains its physical integrity, although the church as it stands is the result of three distinct stages of construction, the rectory was internally modified in the 1960s, and the parish hall was extended in the 1980s.

== Modifications and dates ==
=== Church ===
The original church was completed and consecrated in 1840. In the early 1860s, architect Edmund Blacket was engaged to undertake alterations and additions to the church. Blacket designed a chancel and vestry, joined to the existing nave via a high chancel arch. The work, which included the introduction of a carved stone pulpit and font, both of them designed by Blacket, was completed in 1862. In 1866, cedar pews with elaborately carved ends, made of local cedar, were installed, replacing the original enclosed pews.

In 1874 a fire caused major damage to the roof, which retained its timber shingles, and appears to have called into question the suitability of the walls of the nave. John Horbury Hunt, who had collaborated with Blacket and therefore understood his work, was engaged to oversee the repairs. Hunt not only reconstructed the roof and replaced the timber shingles in slate, but also removed the internal brick lining of the nave and raised the walls by two courses of sandstone. The increased height of the walls was supported by the modification of the buttresses. A new hammerbeam truss roof, remarkable in design and execution, was constructed. The rustic fence protecting both the church and the rectory was replaced with a picket fence, probably of Hunt's design. This was removed in the 1960s, and has not been replaced.

In 1877, a William Davidson organ was introduced on the left side of the nave, replacing an inferior instrument formerly housed in the organ loft, which was not rebuilt after the fire. In the 1950s it was removed to its present position in the western extremity of the nave, and fitted with an electric blower to replace its hand-worked bellows. It appears to have been in the 1940s, also, that the roof slates were replaced by asbestos tiles, involving also the deletion of the roof dormer vents. In 2004, the restoration of the William Davidson organ, one of the few remaining in NSW, was completed.

Interior alterations have included the deletion of the choir within the chancel; the provision of electric lighting to replace ceiling-hung oil lamps; the installation of commemorative and memorial plaques; and the introduction of a Crucifix and statues. Many of the original windows have been replaced in stained glass, generally donated in memory of members of the parish. The beautifully executed East Window, designed by Bishop William Tyrrell, first Bishop of Newcastle, in memory of his friend E. C. Close, was installed in 1871. Tyrrell himself, as well as the third bishop, George Stanton, is commemorated in memorial windows. Other works have included the introduction of a concrete floor, tiled in parts, and the reroofing of the Church, which was originally of shingles, then of slate, then of asbestos tiles, and is now of fibrous cement tiles. In 1972 a two-walled columbarium was provided just east of the church, while in the early 1970s a City of Westminster gas lamp, imported from the UK, was installed near the main entry.

=== Rectory ===
The rectory, completed in 1843, will like the church originally have had a timber shingled roof. These appear to have been replaced with slate in the mid-1850s. At some stage, the face brick external walls were rendered, and the flagstones of the wide verandah were concealed in cement. In 1847, attic servants' rooms were added in preparation for the use of the dwelling as Bishop Tyrrell's temporary residence. The originally extensive grounds, constituting the parson's horse paddock, were much reduced by the sale of their southern portion. In the mid-1960s, the rectory underwent major alterations, including the introduction of cement roof tiles; the provision of an indoor kitchen, bathroom and lavatory; and the placing out of use of the loft rooms. The latter work involved the removal of the internal staircase and the sealing of the stairwell, and the removal of the now-redundant dormer windows. At some stage the external render was removed. At an unknown date, the rectory grounds were modified by the provision of an asphalt driveway and carriage sweep, and by the construction of a timber-framed garage. The rectory having been slightly damaged by the 1989 earthquake, in conjunction with the necessary repairs its roof tiles were replaced with metal sheeting; the loft rooms were reopened, necessitating the rebuilding of the staircase; the dormer windows were reinstated; and the badly damaged chimneys were reconstructed. The freestanding laundry, formerly the laundry/bathroom, will also originally have had timber shingled roof.

=== Parish hall ===
The parish hall, built in 1849 as the parish schoolhouse, appears to have undergone little alteration, apart from reroofing and the building of a small weatherboard addition at rear, until in 1971 the bell was removed from the stone belfry and later mounted inside the building. In 1983, comparatively substantial additions, including new amenities, replaced the weatherboard element. The parish infants' school, later the Diocesan Book Depository and later the Diocesan Registry, an 1862 building that stood on the corner of Tank Street and High Street, addressing Tank Street and adjacent to and just north of the hall, was demolished in the 1940s. Although the building materials were reused elsewhere, the site remains vacant. A concrete path leads from High Street to the front door of the hall, and continues along the western elevation to provide access to the rear entry, which is the most often used. Between the path and the western wall is a narrow garden. The grounds, which were formerly protected by a picket fence, are now unfenced.

== Heritage listing ==
The St. James' Anglican Church Group, Morpeth is of state heritage significance for its strong association with the prolific 19th century architects Edmund Blacket and John Horbury Hunt, both of whom are recognised as having made important contributions to the development of ecclesiastical buildings in NSW, and especially in the Hunter Region.

The prominent siting of the group in the township of Morpeth is evidence of the initial town plan prepared by the private founder of Morpeth, Lieutenant Edward Charles Close. Its position demonstrates the historic importance of religious observance in the early European settlement of regional NSW. This is emphasised by the fact that the church was one of the first permanent buildings to be established at Morpeth, a settlement important in the history of NSW, while the rectory and parish hall are also among the earliest buildings in the township. Inspired by the example of English church properties, Close deliberately made the group visually prominent so as to mark the location of the township when viewed from river vessels and from the approach roads, a function it continues to perform. The group both marks the entry to the township and demonstrates the central role of the Church of England in the establishment of Morpeth, a settlement important in the history of NSW.

The ecclesiastical group has strong associations with many historically important clergy and locally prominent families, including most notably Bishop William Tyrrell, first Bishop of Newcastle, who regarded St. James' as his parish church. Tyrrell is thought to have planted in the rectory grounds a camelia bush grown from a cutting from the plant nursery at the Macarthur family's Camden Park. Bishop Broughton, the first and only Bishop of Australia and an important figure in the ecclesiastical history of NSW, consecrated the original church on 31 December 1840.

The group constitutes a tangible and legible link to the early European settlement of the Morpeth township and with the Church of England in Australia (now known as the Anglican Church of Australia), a nationally important institution.

The St. James' Anglican Church Group, Morpeth is of state heritage significance for the Horbury Hunt-designed hammerbeam truss roof with boarded ceiling within the church, which is significant for the integrity of its design and skill involved in its execution. Other moveable heritage items that are significant include the sandstone pulpit, a replica of the 13th century example in Beaulieu Abbey, Hampshire, and the ornately carved stone baptismal font, designed by architect Edmund Blacket and installed in 1864.

The St. James' Anglican Church Group, Morpeth is also of state heritage significance for its potential to contribute to an understanding of the manner in which the original church was enlarged and altered by prominent 19th century architects, and also the way in which the fabric has been adapted by succeeding generations. The hall (1849), originally the parish school has the potential to contribute to an understanding of the manner in which denominational educational institutions were affected by the establishment of National Schools (later called Public Schools) by the colonial government, particularly through the influence of Sir Henry Parkes.

The pipe organ, installed in 1877, is one of only a few surviving William Davidson organs in NSW. It has attracted considerable interest from the Organ Historical Trust of Australia, and has the potential to provide information as to the fabric and design of colonial pipe organs.

St James' Anglican Church was listed on the New South Wales State Heritage Register on 27 January 2017 having satisfied the following criteria.

The place is important in demonstrating the course, or pattern, of cultural or natural history in New South Wales.

The St. James' Anglican Church Group, Morpeth is of state historical significance as it constitutes a tangible and legible link to the early European settlement of the township and Port of Morpeth, and as such with the early colonisation of NSW.

The siting of the St. James' Group in the township is evidence of the initial town plan prepared by Lieutenant Edward Charles Close, founder of Morpeth, a private township important in the physical and economic development of NSW. Its location in a prominent position, both visually and in proximity to the main thoroughfares, demonstrates the historic importance of religious observance in the early European settlement of regional NSW. This is emphasised by the fact that the church, marking the location and entry to the embryonic village, was one of the first permanent buildings to be established at Morpeth, while the rectory (with external bathroom/laundry) and parish hall were among the township's earliest buildings, and are certainly some of the earliest to survive.

The church furthermore provides evidence as to the nature and early development of local religious institutions, not least in its fabric and layout. It also provides evidence as to liturgical practices with regard to the local application of the High Church/Oxford Movement as favoured by William Tyrrell and his successors. Morpeth, rather than Newcastle was, until the early 20th century, the centre of the Diocese of Newcastle, an institution of historical importance to the colony and state of NSW, and the place of residence of the first four bishops of the Diocese of Newcastle.

The place has a strong or special association with a person, or group of persons, of importance of cultural or natural history of New South Wales's history.

The St. James' Anglican Church Group, Morpeth is of state significance for its historic association with prolific 19th century architects Edmund Blacket and John Horbury Hunt, both of whom are recognised as having made important contributions to the development of ecclesiastical buildings in NSW, and especially in the Hunter Region.

The St. James Anglican Church Group, Morpeth is of state significance for its association with Lieutenant Edward Charles Close, who conveyed to the Diocese of Newcastle the land on which the church, rectory and hall are located, and substantially funded the erection of the buildings. Close, a capable artist whose works provide invaluable evidence of early colonial life in Sydney, the Illawarra and the Hunter River district, may have designed the church, and potentially the parish hall (originally the parish schoolhouse).

The ecclesiastical group has strong historical associations with many historically important clergy and locally-prominent families, including most notably Bishop William Tyrrell, first Bishop of Newcastle, who lived at the rectory, in the grounds of which he is said to have planted a camelia associated with the Macarthur family, and regarded St. James' as his parish church. Bishop Broughton, first and only Bishop of Australia and an important figure in the ecclesiastical history of NSW, consecrated the original Church on 31 December 1840.

The group is also of state significance for its close relationship the Church of England in Australia (now known as the Anglican Church of Australia), an institution of historical importance to NSW.

The place is important in demonstrating aesthetic characteristics and/or a high degree of creative or technical achievement in New South Wales.

The St. James' Anglican Church Group, Morpeth is of state significance for its aesthetic characteristics and demonstration of creative and technical achievement.

As a landmark in the early colonial townscape of Morpeth, the church building is a fine example of a small early colonial stone-built country church in the English manner executed in a restrained Colonial Gothic style, also described as Old Colonial Gothick Picturesque. The rectory is significant as an example of a Colonial Georgian brick country parsonage, distinguished by its steeply pitched roof, simple verandah posts, and french doors with shutters to provide both security and the regulation of ventilation as required. The parish hall is significant as an example of a simple sandstone-built structure formerly used as a parish schoolhouse and reused as a hall.

The furniture of the church is executed with particular care. The open pews, featuring late examples of Edmund Blacket bench ends, were installed in 1864. The encaustic tiles, reused from John Eales Jnr's celebrated Duckenfield Park House (demolished 1916), one of the great houses of the colony, are fine examples of their type. The E. C. Close memorial window (East Window), designed by Bishop Tyrrell in memory of his friend E. C. Close (d. 1866), made in England and paid for by Close's former tenants, and installed in 1871, graphically demonstrates the central doctrines of the Church of England as transplanted to Australia. It is a fine example of its type, and is beautiful in conception, fabric and function.

The Horbury Hunt-designed hammerbeam truss roof with boarded ceiling, a defining feature of the interior and a very fine example of its type both in the integrity of its conception and the skill involved in its execution, is a radical departure from Hunt's customary unadorned "as from saw" construction, and is therefore of state heritage significance.

The sandstone pulpit, a replica of the 13th century example in Beaulieu Abbey, Hampshire, is delicately carved. As a most unusual example of Blacket's work in its having, at Bishop Tyrrell's insistence, been executed from Blacket's copy of English measured drawings; in its being corbelled out of the nave wall; and in its being entered direct from the vestry, it is of state heritage significance. The finely carved stone baptismal font, installed in 1864, designed by architect Edmund Blacket, is a fine example both of his work and of its type. The East Window (a memorial to E.C. Close), designed by Bishop Tyrrell himself and a fine example of its type, is also of state significance.

The place has potential to yield information that will contribute to an understanding of the cultural or natural history of New South Wales.

The intactness of the St. James' Anglican Church Group, Morpeth, as well as the quality of the design and execution of the pulpit and hammerbeam truss roof, indicates that the group is of state heritage significance as an important reference site for understanding the religious and physical development of Morpeth, a township of importance in the development of NSW.

The church incorporates elements of the original building (1837), as well as 1860s and 1870s elements, providing evidence of the manner in which the original church was enlarged and altered by prominent 19th century architects, and also the way in which the fabric has been adapted by succeeding generations.

The pipe organ, installed in 1877, is one of only a few surviving William Davidson organs in NSW. It has attracted considerable interest from the Organ Historical Trust of Australia, and has the potential to provide information as to the fabric and design of colonial pipe organs.

The hall (1849), originally the parish schoolhouse, while undistinguished in terms of design and fabric, has the potential to contribute to an understanding of the manner in which denominational educational institutions were affected by the establishment of national schools (later called public schools) by the colonial government, particularly through the influence of Sir Henry Parkes.

The place possesses uncommon, rare or endangered aspects of the cultural or natural history of New South Wales.

While most structural elements of St. James' Anglican Church, Morpeth are not rare in terms of execution and fabric, the John Horbury Hunt-designed hammerbeam truss roof is one of few in NSW, and is radically different from his other roof designs. This roof design, integral to the church, indicates that the church is of state heritage significance for its rarity value.

== See also ==
- List of Anglican churches in New South Wales
- List of Edmund Blacket buildings
