= Morpeth House and Closebourne House =

Historic place in New South Wales, Australia

Morpeth House & Closebourne House
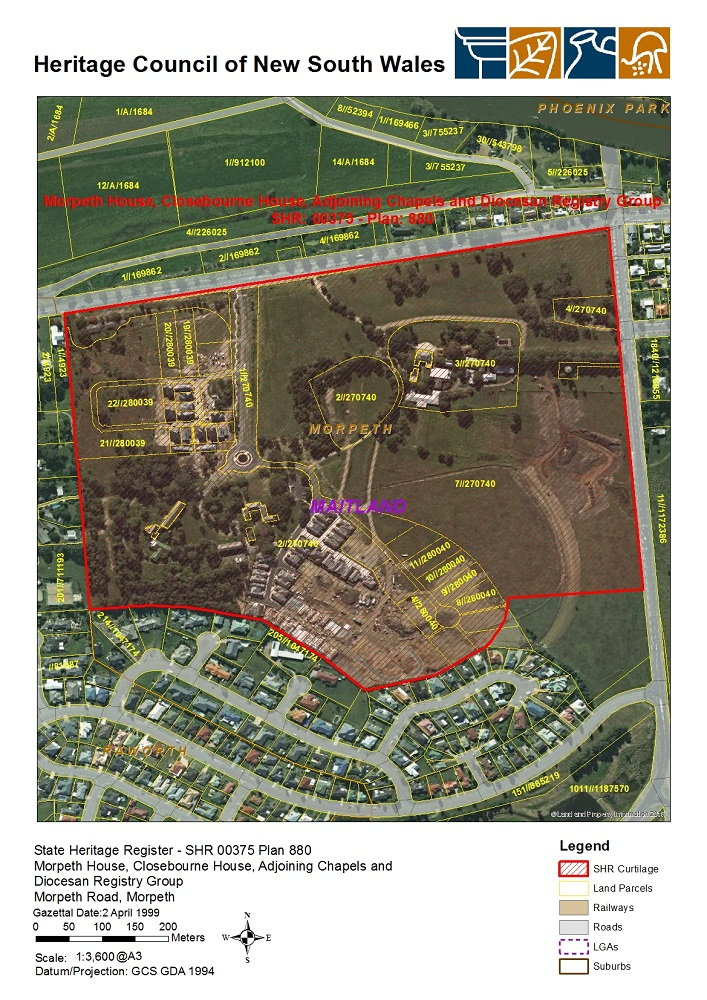
- Heritage boundaries

- Location within New South Wales Location within Australia
- 32.7285°S 151.6198°E
- Location: Morpeth Road, Morpeth, City of Maitland, New South Wales, Australia

History
- Built: 1829–1849

New South Wales Heritage Register
- Official name: Morpeth House, Closebourne House, Adjoining Chapels and Diocesan Registry Group; Morpeth House; Closebourne House; Adjoining Chapels and Diocesan Registry Group; Bishopscourt; Broughton Boys Grammar School
- Type: state heritage (landscape)
- Designated: 2 April 1999
- Reference no.: 375
- Type: Historic Landscape
- Category: Landscape – Cultural

Morpeth House and Closebourne House is a heritage-listed precinct containing two associated residences built by Edward Charles Close at 365 Morpeth Road, Morpeth, City of Maitland, New South Wales, Australia. It includes Morpeth House (variously a private residence, bishop's residence, and theological college) and Closebourne House (variously a private residence, boys' home, grammar school and conference centre). The houses were built from 1829 to 1849 and were added to the New South Wales State Heritage Register on 2 April 1999.

== History ==
=== Aboriginal occupation - pre- and post- European colonialism ===
According to Horton (1994), the band that would be of interest to this area, would be the family groupings of the Wonnaruah, although early accounts mention the Gringai who it appears may have been a family grouping of the Wonnaruah. They probably had various base camps along tributaries of the Hunter River. The camps would have been near reliable watercourses. The pathways to other bands or to food, shelter or ceremonial resources were generally along creeks and associated watercourses or ridgelines. The Wonnaruah had extensive relationships with the Awabakal, Gringai, Darkinjung and Worimi.

The section of the Hunter River at Morpeth was called Coonanbarra. The landing place for the first European contact at Morpeth was immediately west of the subject site. The landing place would have been chosen as it was probably the landing place and access to the river by the Aboriginal people. The Hunter River was known as Coquon.

The site under study would have been ideally located for a camp, being close to the river, flood plains and swamps as food sources, but removed far enough to give some protection from mosquitoes, with commanding surveillance of surrounding areas.

=== Early occupation by the Close family ===
The area that now contains Morpeth House (later known as St John's College) was part of a grant of 2600 acres, given in 3 lots (1030, 1020 and later 560 acres), given by Governor Lachlan Macquarie in about 1821 to Lieutenant Edward Close who had been appointed Engineer of Public Works in Newcastle.

Lieutenant Close came to NSW with the 48th Regiment of Foot in 1817. After three years of service, he resigned his commission and was appointed Engineer of Public Works to Newcastle by Governor Lachlan Macquarie. As a retired officer, he was entitled to the land grant. Part of this grant was at the end of the navigable section of the Hunter River. The grant was later regretted by the Government of the day.

The original house, Closebourne House, later renamed Bishopscourt, was home to the Close family from 1821 to 1849 when it was subdivided to provide a home for the first Bishop of Newcastle. Morpeth House was then built by the Close family as their residence. Thereafter, the two houses and their grounds have had separate existences.

Close expended some effort and expense to clear the land for his first, temporary, house. It has been suggested in the archaeological report (by Wendy Thorp) that this might still exist in the town of Morpeth on the south-western corner of Berkeley and Close Streets.

The first principal work was to reshape the environment to his particular needs and to do so he had the labour of assigned convicts. The open grassy meadows which now characterise the area derive from this initial clearance and reflect Close's needs for agriculture and animal husbandry and, by example, the European need to introduce familiar staples to an alien landscape. The assigned labour also was used to quarry stone from the estate to be used in the main house.

Close commenced work during the early to mid-1820s on a second and more imposing two-storeyed Georgian-style house, Closebourne House. Located on a rise with commanding views of the river, his choice of this site is illustrative of his concerns and perceptions. At the most basic, it afforded protection from floods. At the same time it provided panoramic views of the river. The choice of the site, the way in which the land was cleared and a wide sweep of lawn formed before the house with landmark plants (such as towering fastigiate Cook's pine trees, Araucaria columnaris: Stuart Read, pers.comm., 9/12/2016) to either side of the house and the broad semi-circular carriage drive (which had one entrance at or near the intersection of Tank Street and Morpeth Road and the other in its present location to the west along Morpeth Road) reflect Close's tastes, sophistication and conformity to the then highly fashionable arcadian aesthetic expressed at other contemporary estates such as Captain John Piper's Henrietta Villa at Darling Point, Sydney.

(The path for the drive shown on the 1838 plan must be regarded as broadly indicative only. The purpose of this plan was to show the village and the western end of the drive is far away from this. No evidence has been found to indicate the drive to be anywhere other than its present location).

The choice, either consciously or otherwise, was also a political one. It made a clear statement of the superiority of Close's position with respect to the ongoing conflict with the Government over his ownership of this strategic site. It established EC Close as the most important person in the district. Furthermore, the position of the house, in relation to the village that was surveyed next to the river and below the level of the house, is a clear statement of the social hierarchy which had Edward Close at the apex, in a manner not dissimilar to a feudal fief.

In a similar vein, Close provided a number of civic amenities from his land grant, not least of which were the building of St James's Church, hall and rectory, land for the cemetery and a parish school house.

Close subdivided his land in the 1840s during a severe depression in the colony. In 1840, some 20 of the lots were put up for sale. In 1841, another 35 went under the hammer and another 9 in 1849. In 1849, he sold his house, Closebourne, to the new Anglican Bishop of Newcastle for the sum of 1,600 pounds.

==== Closebourne House ====
Upon its purchase by Bishop William Tyrrell in 1849, Closebourne House became known as Bishopscourt, a common colonial name for the home of the Bishop.

Tyrrell was the first Anglican Bishop of Newcastle, consecrated in 1847 in England. On his arrival, he lived in St James's Rectory for two years until the Diocese bought Closebourne from Edward Close. There is no known record of alterations to the house during his tenure. He is known to have been a keen gardener and may have been responsible for the introduction of many fruit trees, flowers and other exotic garden flora.

The occupation of Closebourne as Bishopscourt and Diocesan administration of the Anglican Diocese of Newcastle was as follows:

- 1849–1879: Bishop William Tyrrell.
- 1880–1886: Bishop Josiah Brown Pearson. Tenders were called for work at the house but the extent of these works is not known.
- 1887–1891: Diocesan administration by Canon Selwyn as Administrator of the Diocese during Bishop Pearson's illness and return to England. Pearson resigned his office in 1889 and died in England.
- 1891–1905: Bishop George Henry Stanton. In preparation for his arrival, the house was re-roofed, floors repaired, painting and other works were carried out, suggesting that the place may have fallen into some disrepair. Bishop Stanton is credited with planting the avenue of brush box trees (Lophostemon confertus) from the house to St James Church.
- 1906–1912: Bishop John Francis Stretch. He had a room built behind the house which was demolished in 1984 and the site is known as the "Bishop Stretch Room".

In 1912, the residence of the Bishops of Newcastle was moved to the city itself. There is no clear picture of what happened to the house for the next ten years.

During the First World War, the Diocese became active in the provision of schools and homes for children. The Children's Home Committee was established in 1918 under the direction of Bishop Reginald Stephen. It was decided at some point to put Bishopscourt to use as a home for disadvantaged children and 3,370 pounds was spent in alterations. By 1922, 31 boys and 4-10 were living at Bishopscourt, which had been renamed St Alban's Boys' Home, under the charge of two Sisters of the Community of the Holy Name. As the years went by, demand for places climbed and in 1925 a contract was let to enclose the balcony to provide further accommodation. Other minor repairs were made and electricity was installed. Later in 1929, a large room was built as a recreation space or gymnasium.

The Second World War brought with it other concerns, among them that the city was not a safe place for children. The Boys and Girls Grammar Schools were moved out of the city. The Boys Grammar School was moved into Bishopscourt and named the Broughton Boys Grammar School. A new property was found in Murrurundi for the St Alban's Boys' Home.

The Broughton Boys Grammar School remained at Bishopscourt from 1942 until 1959. During this time many changes were made to the premises, including the provision of sports facilities - most noticeably the Oval, and also tennis courts which have been replaced by the swimming pool. In 1946, the Registry was built using materials from the Old Book Depot which had been built next to St James Church in the 19th century. Six classrooms and an Assembly Hall were also erected to the east of the Canon Wilson block, as well as a dining room extension. A large number of trees and shrubs were also planted at this time. Other new buildings included a new dormitory, hobbies shed and general storage used.

During the early 1950s, a full agricultural course was introduced into the curriculum. An aerial photograph from about 1950 shows a large ploughed field and other paddocks to the east and west of the house.

A new bicycle shed was added in 1952 and a domestic staff block, sick bay and garage were added a year later. A new dormitory opened in 1955 and the foundation stone for a new dining hall was laid. However, as the 1950s wore on, expenses increased and it was decided in 1959 to close the school.

This gave the Diocese the opportunity to do something else and the Diocesan Conference Centre was opened here. The 1946 school hall was enlarged and three new buildings were erected on the site: Belle Vue House, Cintra House and Tillimby House (Wendy Thorp in her archaeological report states that Belle Vue may have come from another site; however, it is now known that it has been moved from the Bishop Tyrrell Lodge site). The two cottages on Tank Street were converted for overflow accommodation.

Landscaping was undertaken later to provide for the thousands of visitors who now came through the place each year. Trees and bushes were planted and picnic tables were placed along the roadside verge, and near the new pool on the site of the earlier tennis court.

The 1980s saw many changes to the site. A five-stage programme of works was planned to turn the centre into one of the foremost Christian communities in Australia. All the additions and secondary structures added to Closebourne, including the verandah enclosures and the Bishop Stretch Room, were removed. The house was re-roofed and the cellar was dug out. It had been filled with earth at some unknown point in time.

In 1982, Bishop Tyrrell Lodge was erected at the back of Closebourne House to provide accommodation for 52 people. At the same time, the former gymnasium was converted to a chapel and was dedicated in 1983. The garden next to it was created in 1990.

=== Morpeth House ===
When Edward Close sold Closebourne to Bishop Tyrrell in 1849, he moved back into his original house in town. Meanwhile, he started building his third home on the hill above Closebourne to the south-west. The house was a single-storey stone-built residence and was originally set in about 40 hectares (100 acres) which the family moved into in 1856. Wendy Thorp in her archaeological report describes the house thus:

Morpeth House was designed in a Regency style on a plan said to have been influenced by the experience of Edward Close in Spain. It was described as having a front which had a verandah across it on the northern elevation, two wings to the east and west and a detached kitchen and offices extending the entire width along the southern side. The land within the square enclosed by these wings was planted as a flower garden. It is likely that a formal drive was built from Morpeth Road, probably in the area of College Drive, to provide access to the new home. The form of the house is shown on an aerial photograph of about 1950 which clearly defines the four wings. The fourth, or southern service wing, appears to be L-shaped with the short foot at the eastern end. It also appears that the wing did not at that time extend across the full southern side of the quadrangle of Morpeth House.

— Wendy Thorpe

Edward Close died in 1866, ten years after his wife who died in the year they moved into Morpeth House. The Close estate remained in the hands of Close's three sons. The eldest, Edward, lived there for a short time, after which the house and grounds were let. At this point the link between Morpeth and Closebourne Houses were severed.

Occupation and ownership of the house were as follows:

- 1869: House and 101 acres let to MW Christian.
- 1874: House let to Benjamin Lee (Jnr) MLA.
- 1874: House put up for auction. It did not sell.
- 1878: House offered for auction again. The result is not known.
- 1880s: House was owned by John Eales. Thereafter, it was let to a variety of tenants.
- 1925: Purchased from the estate of John Eales as the site for St John's Theological College.

In the years prior to this purchase, much of the original Close Estate land was sold. Subdivision posters of the time display the extent of this land. Following the sales of the subdivided allotments, the present day boundary of the two properties of Closebourne and Morpeth Houses was formed.

St John's Theological College was formed to provide training for ordination for candidates from the Dioceses of Newcastle, Grafton, Armidale, Riverina, Goulburn and Bathurst. It was decided to site the college here because of its proximity to rail transport and possibly because Newcastle's plan was for the college to be built as three sets of double house blocks three floors high with an administration block, all arranged around a quadrangle. This large and impressive plan would have caused the demolition of Morpeth House, but, as the scheme was not carried out, the house was saved and converted to college use, providing a temporary chapel, library, lecture room, printing room and dormitory. The parts that were built of the grand 1925 scheme were Robinson House, dining room and the principal's residence.

The college was opened in 1926 on a much smaller scale than originally planned. A new chapel constructed of salvaged material from the town, was opened in 1941. During the Second World War, the theological college in Morpeth and the Newcastle Church of England Grammar School for Girls swapped premises in 1942 and 1943. The theological college resumed its Morpeth home in 1943.

A house on the western side of the site, immediately outside the present boundary, was used as a vice principal's residence until 1960, when a purpose-built structure was constructed north-east of Morpeth House.

Building work progressed in a piece-meal fashion. Accommodation for married men became necessary after the war; so a war-surplus prefabricated hut was purchased and erected in the quadrangle behind the house block and in 1946 moved behind the Burgmann Lodge. In 1949, trustees of church property of the Diocese purchased the Morpeth Hotel with the intention of converting it to flats to house teachers of the Broughton Boys Grammar School. The plan did not eventuate but some of the stone was used in 1954 to build Calvary Garden.

In 1955, the ownership of the college was taken over by the Diocese of Newcastle amid fears for the financial situation of the college. With this act, Morpeth and Closebourne Houses came under the same ownership again after a separation of 106 years. A£112,000 was spent on renovations and new building which included repairs to Morpeth House and the demolition of the south and parts of the east wing. Robinson House was extended in 1956, and in 1958 a library added to the east wing of Morpeth House. In 1960, a new house was built for the Vice Principal, and in the following year Burgmann House was erected as a new dormitory block. This enabled all 76 students to be accommodated on site.

Shortly after this, in 1963, memorial gates were erected to the drive entrance in memory of Francis de Witt Batty, seventh Bishop of Newcastle.

The last buildings to be erected on the Morpeth House site were two blocks of accommodation for married students in the Storrs and Davies buildings, erected between 1970 and 1977. Apart from these projects the only other significant changes to the site appear to have been the planting of trees as screens along most of the college drive during the 1970s and 1980s.

St John's College entered into a collaborative agreement with Charles Sturt University and is now the main focus for the newly formed School of Theology. It continues its role as an Anglican theological college.

The Morpeth House and St John's College site is situated at the west end of the township of Morpeth, its open space juxtaposed with the regular grid subdivision and built structures of the town. The site overlooks Morpeth Road and the Hunter River to the north, and Tank Street, the southern edge of Morpeth and the river flood plain to the east. It occupies a prominent ridge which follows the river and which continues into the town. The highest point on this ridge is occupied by the Morpeth House group, while the Closebourne House group is situated a short distance to the east on a slightly lower but more prominent section of the same ridge.

The character of the site is varied comprising open rural zones, water catchment areas, wooded zones, structured and unstructured landscaped areas and built up areas surrounding Closebourne House and Morpeth House.

The setting of the place is diverse whilst at the same time reflecting the unique character of the Hunter Region, which is dominated by the Hunter River and its flood plains. The historic complex of the site, comprising the Closebourne House Group and Morpeth House Group situated on the ridge, is oriented toward the river and rural landscape to the north.

The historic town of Morpeth provides a low-scale urban setting to the east of the site in contrast to the rural setting to the north and southeast. There is also a strong connection between the site and St James Church and Rectory to the south-west of the town and the cemetery to the south, both of which will be discussed elsewhere.

The site is bounded to the east and south east by an open rural landscape with floodplains beyond. This setting is punctuated by views of the cemetery in the distance. The openness of the rural landscape changes abruptly to the south where modern residential development extends along most of the southern and all of the western boundaries of the site.

The open landscaped area to the north east of the site along Tank Street forms a rural edge, which contrasts with the low scale urban edge of the town of Morpeth adjacent. This serves to make a distinction between the site as a place of theological learning, and the town as a place of commerce. The strong connection between the site and St James Church as represented by the avenue of brush box trees (Lophostemon confertus) further emphasises this relationship. In the 19th century, this contrast reinforced the relationship between the park-like estate setting of Close's mansion and the township of Morpeth which he planned and oversaw.

The Closebourne House group is highly visible from Morpeth Road to the north and is the most accessible and readily identified part of the site's historic precinct situated along the ridgeline. Buildings and structures are clustered around Closebourne House extending east along the southern edge of the tree-lined avenue which forms a strong axial connection between the precinct and St James Church on the other side of Tank Street.

=== Morpeth House Group ===
This is a group of buildings arranged around a central space and adjacent walled courtyards, with construction dates ranging from 1849 to 1977.

Single-storey Victorian Regency residence with north-facing verandah to main house and east and west wings forming courtyard to rear. Sandstone walls. Slate roof, each wing roofed separately. Timber floors; lime-plastered walls; some original plastered ceilings but most replaced in metal sheeting; painted and polished cedar joinery; polished cedar and later marble chimney pieces. Timber verandah columns with french doors opening onto verandah. Unusual french door cases with external architraves and panelled reveals. Evidence of a central underground water storage cistern in rear courtyard.

Morpeth House is the earliest building in the group. Building commenced 1849 as new home for Close family who vacated Closebourne House and moved into Morpeth House in 1856. House and land leased as farm/residence from 1869 to 1925. Purchased by St. John's College Council 1925. It was originally sited with views towards the river with a carriage circle in front. Front garden altered and carriage loop removed in late 1920s when tennis courts constructed. Large east room (New Testament Room) used as chapel until 1941, when St John's Chapel was built. Rooms used for teaching and offices 1925 to present.

North verandah partially enclosed (now removed but shown in 1926 photograph). Significant alterations to east wing for library extension 1958. Demolition of south wing c. 1960s. Further detailed investigation needed to establish extent of alterations to main house. North and west wings appear to retain their original configurations with some fabric altered.

It was used as an administration centre and teaching spaces for St. John's College and an arrival point for visitors to the college.

It has been assessed as having exceptional significance with a high degree of integrity.

The Closebourne estate was sold by the Anglican Church to developer Lendlease in the 2000s. Part of the site was sold for residential development, while the remainder was developed as an Over-55's retirement Village. Extensive parts of the site remain as open space. Morpeth House is now used as the administration centre and community facilities for the Closebourne Village retirement complex.

The siting of Morpeth House is similar to Closebourne House with the exception that it is less dominating in the landscape but retains visual links back to the town and the river. When Lieut close took up residence at Morpeth House, he commenced planting and establishment of gardens around the house, but nowhere near the scale of Closebourne House. Trees planted around this time included the Camphor Laurels and the Kauri Pine intended to be a landmark tree.

During its use as St John's College, planting and landscape works were not given much consideration, except for small projects including the tennis courts, Calvary Garden and the small pin plantation. The most significant change was the removal in the late 1920s of the carriage loop and construction of tennis courts in front of Morpeth House. The area containing Morpeth House and the college buildings was fenced as a single space, its garden treated in an institutional manner.

Dividing fence constructed between Morpeth House and Closebourne properties c. 1849. Removed early 1980s. Tree planting established in 1960s around oval and along driveways. The dense native plantings (undertaken 1980s by the local community) running on both sides of Bishop Batty Drive, block openness intended for the front paddocks and now obscure the house from views both in and out.

==== St John's Chapel ====
This is a simple rectangular stone building with sandstone walls, hipped gable roof and curved vents, and asbestos cement shingled roof in diagonal pattern. Internally, it has sandstone walls with cedar panelling behind pews, carpet on concrete floor, ceiling lined with hardboard, with timber battens and exposed timber purlins over timber trusses. Raised organ and gallery above entry at southern end. Leadlight windows in timber frames throughout. Exposed timber trusses. Polished cedar church pews and matching wall panelling. Chapel oriented along north–south axis.

The chapel was constructed in 1941 from recycled sandstone originally in Campbell and Company's Stores building, Morpeth which was constructed in the 1830s and demolished in 1939. It is adjacent to Morpeth House. It has been assessed as in good condition, with a very high degree of integrity, having had no obvious alterations following construction.

The chapel was modified by Lendlease in 2012 and now forms part of the community facilities for the Closebourne Retirement Village. The pews were removed and a modern kitchen installed. Glass doors were installed for access from the outside and for access to the Calvary Garden. The organ loft and organ have been retained and the chapel is still used to host non-denominational church services for Closebourne Village residents.

==== Calvary Garden ====
This is a rectangular walled garden (dry sandstone) with cross-axial plan arrangement, principal axis running east–west with chapel building at west end and altar at east end. Access to garden is via gates centred in north and south walls and doorway from chapel at western end. East wall has three vertical openings each side of altar.

Established in 1954 as a garden chapel adjoining St John's Chapel. Work progressed on stones walls of chapel over a number of years, carried out by college students under the direction of vice warden Dr Smythe. Constructed from recycled sandstone originally in the Illalaung Hotel, Morpeth, which was built in the early 1830s and demolished c. 1953.

Garden contains stone altar and benches arranged around perimeter walls. Stepping stones mark out principal axes. Large stone cross on altar originally from Book Depot or Diocesan Registry building with metal (bronze?) crucifix made by the late Sr Angela (who headed a community at Stroud). Decorative Iron gates in north and south walls. Height of south wall raised in 1967.

It is an extension of St. John's Chapel. It has been assessed as being in good condition with a high degree of integrity. The garden is now part of the community facilities of the Closebourne Retirement Village, where it was known as the Secret Garden. During 2024, a new facility for the Closebourne Retirement Village, called the Garden Pavilion, was constructed on the Calvary Garden site. The construction extended beyond the Calvary Garden area to the south. The location of the original garden wall has been incorporated into the pavilion floor.

==== Library ====
The building is in the Post War American Colonial Style with small-paned windows and a simple rectangular form.

Construction 1957–1958 following partial demolition of east wing of Morpeth House. Designed by architect Ian Pender. Built as part of renovations and capital works program carried out mid to late 1950s.

The west facade entry porch/gallery has sandstone facing. The north, south and east facades are face brick with sandstone lintels over windows. The entrance lobby has a slate roof, while the main roof is terracotta tile. Aluminium awnings over windows to east and south facades. Stained glass window in entrance lobby originally brought from College in Armidale in 1926 and then placed in Temporary Dining Hall until 1980s. Buttresses to south facade for planned future extension.

Internally, the main space has walls in face brick, with a cork tile on concrete floor. The cornice/ceiling is of coved plaster with acoustic tiles set flush. Timber frame casement windows with fanlights in polished finish/dark stain. Built in shelves around perimeter walls.

It has been assessed as being in excellent condition with a very high degree of integrity.

==== Principal's Residence/Warden's Lodge ====
Two-storey Inter-War Old English residence. Built in 1925–1926. Designed by architect Louis R Williams. Constructed as part of stage 1 works for new theological college.

Light-coloured face brick walls with concrete lintels to windows and terracotta tile roof. Two-storey portico on western facade. Internally, leadlight panel and sidelight to front doors. Painted joinery except for staircase in polished Queensland Maple. Panelled ceilings with splayed cornice an exposed concrete beams to ground floor. Painted plaster walls with rendered skirtings and timber picture rails. Fireplaces in face brick with painted timber mantel.

It now houses the St John's College manager's residence. It is part of the group including the Kitchen Block, Temporary Dining Hall and Robinson House Block constructed as stage 1 of the theological college.

It has had very little alteration, apart from the upgrading of upstairs bathrooms and alterations to servants quarters at southern end of house. The exterior and interior is in excellent condition with a very high degree of integrity, apart from the altered room at south end of the house, which has low integrity.

The Principal's Residence is currently unoccupied, pending redevelopment as part of the Closebourne Village retirement complex.

==== Robinson House (House Block) ====
Two-storey Inter-War Old English accommodation block. Built in 1925–1926. Designed by architect Louis R Williams. Constructed as part of stage 1 works for new theological college.

Light-coloured face brick walls. Terracotta tile roof. Concrete floors to first floor. Interior detailing of original building (where unaltered) similar to that of Principal's Residence. Alterations to interiors generally, especially at north end where new extension built. Further investigation needed.

Building altered when north end extended. Original building had central breakfront at main entry on east facade with open two-storey verandahs on north side of entry has been completely altered obscuring original symmetry. Breakfront and symmetrical arrangement of west facade appears to be original. Building has decorative bracketed eaves.

East facade altered when new extension at north end added in 1956. Two-storey verandahs retained but enclosed south side of entry and demolished and rebuilt as part of new brick extension on north side of entry. Some interiors altered when new extension added and again recently. First floor exposed beam ceilings concealed/removed (?) behind plasterboard. Internal doors with glazed upper panels (same as Principal's Residence) removed and stored on site.

Excellent condition. Medium degree of integrity due to 1956 and later alterations.

Robinson House is currently unoccupied, pending redevelopment as part of the Closebourne Village retirement complex.

A Two-storey post war accommodation block designed to match scale, materials and proportions of original House Block was built in 1956 as an extension to House Block and renamed Robinson House when completed. It was designed by architect Ian Pender and built as part of a renovations and capital works program carried out mid to late 1950s and also included a new library.

It has light-coloured face brick walls and terracotta tile roof. Interior detailing is plainer than original house block. Plaster walls, painted timber skirting, timber frame casement windows. Timber framed floors to first floor.

Distinction between new and old most evident in west facade where fenestration of extension is different to original building - windows in banks of three in former and in banks of four in latter. Distinction between new and old blurred in east facade as original verandahs north of entry demolished and rebuilt in style of new extension.

Excellent condition. Medium degree of integrity.

The Robinson House Extension is currently unoccupied, pending redevelopment as part of the Closebourne Village retirement complex.

==== Temporary Dining Hall and Accommodation Block ====
Single-storey Inter-War timber-frame building with accommodation wing on south side. Built 1925–1926. Constructed as part of stage 1 works for new theological college.

Timber weatherboard on lower half of walls with asbestos cement sheet lining above. Corrugated steel sheet roof with vented ridge over dining hall. Internally, timber dado of vertical boards with battened masonite lining above in main dining halls. Timber frame double hung windows and glazed timber frame doors to north. Timber skirtings.

Exposed timber trusses with curved struts are a distinctive feature of the dining halls. Passive ventilation system consisting of latticed ceiling panels and vented ridge is worthy of note. External brick fireplace and chimney to kitchen highly visible from a distance.

Originally a dining hall with kitchen facilities and staff accommodation wing at the rear, it was later used as self-catering conference accommodation.

Lean-to extension in south east corner between accommodation wing and dining hall (date unknown) is in very poor condition. Brick steps and pipe rail added at south end of accommodation wing.

In 2019, the Accommodation Wing of the Dining Hall was demolished due to extensive damage to the floors and floor framing from termite attack and the exterior (mostly asbestos sheeting) sheeting was removed. The remains of the building (floor, frame and roof only) were moved approximately 30 metres to the north-east of the original location and positioned on new metal foundations. During 2019–2020, the building was extensively rebuilt by Closebourne Village owners, Lendlease. The reconstruction retained the exposed timber roof trusses, the passive ventilation system and vented ridge as features. A new metal roof was installed. The building is now being used as a social meeting facility and community workshop for the Closebourne Village retirement complex.

==== Burgmann House ====
Two-storey late 20th-century Stripped Classical style building. Simple rectangular form with gable ends and north-facing two-storey verandah full length of building. Built in 1961 by W Smurthwaite and designed by architect IW Pender as student accommodation for the college.

Face brick walls. Terracotta tile roof. Floors are ground floor concrete, upper floor timber frame, with carpet finish. Walls are painted render. Ceiling is plasterboard with plaster cornice. Skirting is plain painted timber. Windows are aluminium with fly screens. Main lobby has concrete stair with painted steel handrail and timber frame glazed doors. Colonnaded two-storey verandah along north façade with concrete columns/floors and painted steel handrails.

Internal alterations carried out to form 6 units. Generally in good condition (eaves guttering and corroded aluminium windows need attention). High degree of integrity.

Part of Morpeth House Group but stands alone. Provides well scaled visual enclosure to south side of open space. Service buildings to south closely associated with Burgmann House.

After many years of disuse, Burgmann House was demolished in 2018 to allow further development of the Closebourne Village retirement complex.

==== Paths ====
The original carriage loop is no longer visible but evidence for it exist in the form of paving, edge and gutter details and plantings. The loop may survive beneath later elements. The exact location is not known.

Existing gravel entry path

This configuration and its edge details date from the 1920s. The path is intact and in good condition, however, it obscures the original 1850s entry configuration.

Narrow stone and brick path between Morpeth House and Robinson House

Path dates from 1920s and possibly uses material from earlier paving elsewhere. Good condition.

Narrow concrete path from St John's Chapel to Robinson House

Constructed c. 1940s when chapel built. Good condition.

==== Fences and walls ====
Stone walling (low) south and east of chapel

Walling made of dressed stone fragments salvaged from buildings. The date of these walls are unknown but they appear to be part of landscaping works undertaken as part of the chapel construction in the 1940s. Walls are part of the extensive use of salvaged material on the site and reinforced the isolated rural character of the college.

Timber posts and fence remains around original camphor laurels

These fence elements are the only surviving remains of the original fence subdividing Close's 1850s property from Bishopscourt (Closebourne). Condition fair. They are of high significance.

==== Tennis courts ====
Constructed 1920s as recreation facility for St John's College. Originally 2 courts. Poor condition. Western court now unfenced and ruined. Intrusive elements, as they obscure principal front and entry to Morpeth House.

=== Closebourne House group ===
This is a cluster of buildings in close proximity, with construction dates ranging from 1827 to 1982.

Major trees planted when Closebourne House was constructed in 1829 included the Moreton Bay figs (Ficus macrophylla) flanking both garden entrances and a single Cook's pine (Araucaria columnaris), and later the Araucaria pines in the 1840s. Kitchen garden and house paddocks established 1830s-1840s. Both Lieut Close and subsequent Bishops were interested in using landmark trees to identify important sites. From the time of Bishop Tyrrell's occupation of Closebourne (1849) until the diocesan base moved to Newcastle (1912), the gardens were further developed by the various Bishops who occupied the house. Bishops Tyrrell and Stanton were known as keen gardeners.

Brushbox Avenue planted by Bishop Stanton c.1890s. During the time of St Albans Boys' Home (1922–1942) and Broughton boys' Home (1942–1959), tree-planting was not based on any themes and with little regard for earlier plantings. The first Araucaria was removed and sporting facilities were provided during this time. Aerial photograph from 1958 shows very sparse tree planting with majority of site with no trees.

The landscape was further modified to accommodate the needs of the Diocesan Conference Centre (from c. 1960). The most major change to the Closebourne House grounds occurred with the reworking of the front gardens, following a conservation management plan prepared by Tropman and Tropman.

==== Closebourne House (Bishopscourt) ====
Two-storey Colonial Georgian residence with north-facing verandah to main house, and east and west wings forming courtyard to rear. Sandstone walls. Shingle roof to main house, corrugated steel roof to rear wings. Two-storey Colonial Georgian residence with north-facing verandah to main house, and east and west wings forming courtyard to rear. Mouldings on original door panels are run in with rail, stiles and muntins. This is an 18th-century technique and unusual in this period of building. Evidence of a water storage cistern/well in rear courtyard. Evidence of a water storage cistern/well in rear courtyard.

Front verandah considerably altered: original verandah with open parapet & timber posts demolished; new verandah with eaves and cast iron columns built (c. late 1800s shown in 1912 photo); enclosed upper storey verandah added (c. 1925 shown in 1937 photo); two-storey verandah demolished and reconstruction of original built with enclosed parapet (1980–1988). Some inconsistency in detailing between original verandah and reconstruction.

The building was completed when first occupied by the Close family in c. 1829. From c. 1849 to 1879, Bishop William Tyrrell resided there, during which time it was known as "Bishopscourt". From 1891 to 1905 Bishop George Henry Stanton resided there, during which time some alterations were carried out. In c. 1912, Bishop Stretch Room constructed at rear of building. In c. 1922, it was converted to St Alban's Boys Home with associated alterations. In c. 1925, construction of enclosed upper verandah to provide more accommodation for boys. Between 1942 and 1959, the Newcastle Boys Grammar School moved into Closebourne buildings. In c. 1960, the first conference was held in a new conference centre located in Closebourne buildings. Between 1980 and 1988, conservation works were undertaken under direction of Geoffrey Danks (NSW Heritage Council) included: removal of enclosed upper verandah, reconstruction of original verandah, demolition of Bishop Stretch Room, opening up of cellar, internal conservation works. In 1993, further conservation works undertaken including restoration of rear verandah & stone repairs & alterations to east wing.

It was originally the Close family residence, and is now administration for the conference centre and teaching spaces. It is the earliest building in group and earliest extant building on site. It is the arrival point for visitors to Conference Centre. It is visually prominent when viewed from north, northeast to northwest across open landscaped area.

It has been assessed as being in fair condition with a high degree of integrity.

Closebourne House was extensively restored and refurbished by Lendlease in 2018–2019. It is planned to be the administration centre for a residential aged care facility. The development of the aged care facility was approved by the Regional Planning Committee in 2020 and construction works are planned to commence in 2021. The development will result in some of the associated (non-heritage) buildings being demolished.

In June 2021, three of the outbuildings planned for demolition were severely damaged by a fire lit by vandals.

==== Closebourne Laundry ====
Single-storey brick structure with stone sills. Corrugated steel roof. Original 12 pane double hung windows and bead flush panelled door in east wall.

Built in the late 1800s as a simple service building associated with Closebourne House adjacent. Evidence of early covered way connecting it with west wing of Closebourne House. Building was extended to south with construction of gymnasium (c. 1930) and eastern verandah (date unknown). Doorway in north wall blocked up and covered way to west wing of Closebourne House demolished (date unknown). Gymnasium and verandah extension as set out in brief history above.

It is now used as a single bedroom flat. Defines western edge of garden at rear of Closebourne House. It is in good condition, apart from potential damp problems due to concrete slabs adjacent to walls, but has a low degree of integrity.

==== Closebourne Chapel (Gymnasium) ====
Single-storey brick structure as extension to laundry building later modified to pen up to the verandah and garden to the east. Corrugated steel roof. Eastern verandah as unifying element connecting Laundry Building, Chapel and garden.

Built c. 1930 as recreation room/gymnasium for boys when St Alban's Boys Home located in Closebourne House. Converted to Closebourne Chapel in 1983. Alterations undertaken when converted to a chapel in 1983 including opening up of east wall and installation of new glazed doors and windows to accommodate outdoor services.

It is in good condition, with a medium degree of integrity due to the 1983 alteration.

==== The Registry (Canon Wilson Memorial Building) ====
Twin-gable single-storey brick building with decorative stone sills, window and door surrounds. 1940s face brick with 1850s stone sills and reveals to openings. 1940s face brick walls with 1850s stone sills and reveals to openings. Corrugated steel roof with east west box gutter. Internally, bagged and painted brick walls; plain timber skirting; battened masonite ceiling with timber scotia; recycled 1850s timber frame casement windows; some recycled 1850s timber doors. Reuse of recycled stone quoins around openings as decorative feature. Pointed arched doorways in east wall. Original building configuration altered when relocated.

Constructed 1946 from recycled materials originally in the Book Depot Building located north of St James Church, Tank Street (near the Parish Hall), which was built in 1853 as a book depository, became the Diocese Registry and was demolished in 1946. Used as library and art room in 1948 when known as Canon Wilson Memorial Building.

Originally a library and art room, it is now used for archival storage and meeting rooms.

It has been assessed as being in fair condition, with a low degree of integrity due to recycled elements crudely incorporated e.g. stone lintels missing).

==== Dining hall/kitchen ====
Post War Ecclesiastical face brick building (some weatherboard infill on eastern elevation) with north-facing colonnade and service wing and enclosed yard at rear. Glazed doors and sidelights open onto colonnade. Corrugated steel roof. Colonnade at front of building with Shallow inverted "V" arches in painted concrete or render and parapet above.

Internally, the dining hall has face brick walls; polished timber floor; plasterboard ceiling? Painted timber frame doors and windows; raised stage at eastern end.

Built 1955 as part of stage 1 of master plan prepared by Ian Pender for expansion of Newcastle Boys Grammar School. Intended as dual purpose space – Assembly Hall, Dining Hall and Kitchen Block.

It is now an assembly/dining hall and kitchen block for both St John's College and conferences.

It was considered to be focal point for the Grammar School and its community activities at time of construction. Located at southern end of the landscaped courtyard between Closebourne House and Registry Building.

It has no obvious alterations, and has been assessed as in good condition with a high degree of integrity.

==== Bishop Tyrrell Lodge ====
Single-storey late 20th-century brick U-shaped building with timber framed verandah to north. Building emphasises horizontality and is set low in the landscape. Light-coloured face brick walls, some weatherboard cladding on south side. Corrugated steel roof. Timber frame windows and doors. Vaulted roof over entry porch centred in north-facing verandah. Clerestory windows situated along ridgeline.

Built in 1992 as part of a comprehensive development plan for expansion of Conference Centre. Designed by Woodhouse and Danks as accommodation for people attending conferences.

==== Assembly hall ====
Single-storey timber frame weatherboard building on brick piers with wings at either side of gable at the eastern end and enclosed north-facing verandah. Corrugated asbestos cement roof. Carpet on timber floor; butt jointed masonite wall linings with timber dado some plasterboard; battened masonite ceiling with exposed trusses; timber frame windows and doors with later aluminium windows north side. Fireplace sheeted over. Exposed steel trusses over main space. Enclosed verandah along north facade added and wider door and sidelight installed in south wall (date unknown). Exposed-duct air conditioning introduced with bulkhead at eastern end of hall. External ducting and plant for air conditioning at west end of hall intrusive element.

Built in 1946 as an assembly hall for the Broughton (Newcastle) Boys Grammar School which moved into the Closebourne buildings 1942–1959. It is now used as a meeting hall and seminar rooms.

Good condition. Medium integrity due to AC plant and north verandah extension.

Separated from Closebourne House and associated buildings. Faces toward open landscaped area (Precinct A) to north. Part of a group which also includes Cintra House, Toilet Block, Workshop, Belle Vue House and Tillimby House.

==== Fire and Future Development ====
In 2021, the Joint Regional Planning Committee approved the construction of a Residential Aged Care Facility (RACF) in the Closebourne House precinct. Closebourne House will become the administration centre for the RACF and the original laundry building will be retained. The remainder of the outbuildings on the site will be demolished to allow for the construction of the RACF. In June 2021, two of the outbuildings were severely damaged by a fire lit by squatters or vandals. Demolition of the site is expected to commence in mid-2021.

=== Broader Morpeth House and St John's College Site ===
==== Brush Box Tree Avenue and Sandstone Steps ====
Avenue of Brushbox trees between Closebourne House and St James Church planted c. 1891 under the direction of Bishop Stanton whilst in residence at Bishopscourt. Sandstone steps and retaining wall at end of tree lined avenue on Tank Street may be earlier c. 1840 following construction of St James Church. Further investigation required.

Mature trees provide shaded walk between Closebourne House and St James Church and frame direct axial vista to and from entry to church. Sandstone steps and retaining wall at Tank Street give access and define the edge of the site.

==== The Water Tower ====
Painted steel tower in shape of inverted cone situation south of Brushbox Avenue of trees. Proximity to trees and dark colour reduce its visual impact within the site. Acts as landmark element when viewed from southern approaches to the site.

Erected between 1967 and 1975 in response to long-standing problems with water pressure on the site.

The Water Tower was removed in 2018.

==== Memorial Gates ====
Sandstone gate piers and flanking stone walls at entrance to Morpeth House group from Morpeth Road. Gateway marking entry to the St John's College grounds.

Built 1962–1963 as a memorial to Bishop Batty and designed by IW Pender.

=== Broader Closebourne House Precinct ===
==== Paths ====
Many of the paths to the north of Closebourne are in their original location, although those to the northeast no longer extend to Morpeth Road. Cut edge and gravel surface details may be original but this will require further research. Details should be checked against good copies of earlier images as well as archaeology. The main paths exited the fenced garden area between large Moreton Bay figs, which survive. Good condition.

Gravel paths around Closebourne, sides and rear may or may not be in original locations. Further research is required. Good condition.

==== Fences ====
Timber rail fence around garden is a 1980s reconstruction of an earlier configuration. Good condition.

==== Trellis/Pergola ====
Pergola made from cast iron columns from 1890s Closebourne verandah. All columns survive and are important element which were removed in 1980s to reconstruct earlier verandah configuration. Columns now support a timber pergola structure adjacent to Closebourne. Sound condition but vulnerable to weather.

== Heritage listing ==
The Morpeth House and St John's College site retains in its context, setting, landscape, buildings, fabric and archaeology, tangible evidence of its central role in the establishment of European settlement in the Hunter Valley and in the founding and evolution of the Anglican Diocese of Newcastle, its ongoing role in the training of clergy as well as in education in the region.

This prominent site immediately adjacent to the first landing point by Europeans is highly likely to have an observation point or gathering ground for the Aboriginal people of the area, its green ridges being a prominent oasis in a heavily vegetated river floor plain.

EC Close chose this dominating site to establish his "manor estate" of Closebourne and laid out his private township and port of Morpeth on the lower ridge adjacent. The location of Closebourne House (1829) and the later Morpeth House (1849–1856) and their associated carefully planned landscape continue to reflect his vision for this relationship as well as his personal status.

The use of Closebourne House as "Bishopscourt", official residence of the first four bishops of Newcastle from 1849 to 1912, commencing with Bishop Tyrrell, played a central role in the establishment of the Anglican Church in the region. Each bishop has made a significant contribution to the landscape and structures on the site.

The relocation of St John's College from Armidale to the Morpeth House site in 1925 and its continued role in the training of Anglican clergy has been highly significant in the church. It is one of only two Anglican Theological Colleges in New South Wales and the only one in a rural context. Together with the continued use of the whole site for education and as a conference/retreat venue, the place has a unique identity both within the region as well as in NSW.

The links and associations between this site with its Arcadian landscape and the adjacent Morpeth township, both established by EC Close, have evolved and in many ways strengthened. The context, setting and fabric which tangibly express these links and associations survive with remarkable clarity and integrity.

The significance of this site cannot be separated from that of the township and former port of Morpeth as they were established as completely interdependent components of one man's vision. The continued role of each in the setting, character and definition of the other, provides a unique and tangible insight into the early European colonisation of the area.

The township of Morpeth is unique in the Hunter region and possibly also in New South Wales as the least altered 19th century "company town" and retains its character and setting as a village in an open rural setting.

The principal buildings on the site by EC Close and St John's College are very fine and unusual examples of their period. They retain a significant amount of original fabric and high integrity. All retain their landscape, context and setting or in the case of Morpeth House, retain the potential for aspects of this significant setting to be restored.

The site retains in its archaeological resources, evidence of the early European establishment, use and occupation of the area.

Morpeth House & Closebourne House was listed on the New South Wales State Heritage Register on 2 April 1999 having satisfied the following criteria.

The place is important in demonstrating the course, or pattern, of cultural or natural history in New South Wales.

Closebourne House and Morpeth House were both built and occupied by EC Close, the founder and builder of Morpeth - the first and most important early European settlement in the Hunter region. Closebourne House, as Bishopscourt from 1849 to 1912, was the first seat of the Anglican Diocese of Newcastle.

The place has a strong or special association with a person, or group of persons, of importance of cultural or natural history of New South Wales's history.

Associations with EC Close, Bishop Tyrrell and the first four Bishops of Newcastle.

The place is important in demonstrating aesthetic characteristics and/or a high degree of creative or technical achievement in New South Wales.

Unique surviving expression of the architectural and landscape ideal of the manorial estate commanding its domain, in this case the town and post of Morpeth.

The place has strong or special association with a particular community or cultural group in New South Wales for social, cultural or spiritual reasons.

Closebourne House as Bishopscourt and later as an Anglican Conference Centre for the Diocese of Newcastle. Morpeth House/St John's College as the centre of Anglican theological training for rural NSW.

The place has potential to yield information that will contribute to an understanding of the cultural or natural history of New South Wales.

As an archaeological resource, potential to enhance existing understanding of the place and its use and occupation.

The place possesses uncommon, rare or endangered aspects of the cultural or natural history of New South Wales.

Unique relationship of Closebourne House to landscape setting and town of Morpeth.

The place is important in demonstrating the principal characteristics of a class of cultural or natural places/environments in New South Wales.

Rare surviving expression of early 19th century mansion and landscaped setting characteristic of early, substantially intact town with intact manor house with intact additional layers of significant Anglican occupation.
