= Sonia Roulston =

Australian Anglican bishop

The Right Reverend Sonia Roulston
- Assistant bishop (Inland Episcopate), Anglican Diocese of Newcastle
- Church: Anglican Church of Australia
- Diocese: Newcastle
- Installed: 10 May 2018

Orders
- Ordination: February 1995 (as deacon); November 1995 (as priest)
- Consecration: 10 May 2018 by Peter Stuart

Personal details
- Born: 1965 or 1966 (age 60–61)
- Denomination: Anglican
- Education: St John's College, Morpeth

Sonia Lee Roulston is an Australian bishop in the Anglican Church of Australia. She has served as an assistant bishop in the Anglican Diocese of Newcastle, as the Assistant Bishop for the Inland Episcopate, since May 2018. She is the first woman to be appointed as a bishop in the history of the Diocese.

Roulston grew up in the Parish of East Maitland when her family moved there while she was in primary school. She became involved in the parish's Sunday school and the Girls' Friendly Society from an early age.

She trained for ministry at St John's College, Morpeth and was ordained as deacon in February 1995 and priest in November of the same year. As priest, Roulston served in a number of different parishes including Gosford, Singleton, Windale, Cessnock and Morpeth. Her last position prior to being ordained to the episcopate was as Diocesan Archdeacon.

In February 2018, Roulston was appointed as Assistant Bishop for the Inland Episcopate, and she was consecrated in that role by Bishop of Newcastle Peter Stuart at Christ Church Cathedral, Newcastle on 10 May 2018 (along with then fellow Archdeacon Charlie Murry who was consecrated as Assistant Bishop for the Coastal Episcopate). Roulston was the first woman appointed to the episcopate in the history of the diocese. Roulston's role involves providing episcopal leadership in the Upper Hunter, Maitland and Paterson regions for the Diocese. Roulston and Murry's appointments marked the first time the Diocese had had more than one assistant bishop, and the roles were made to assist the Diocese in light of the findings of the Royal Commission into Institutional Responses to Child Sexual Abuse.

At the time of her appointment, Roulston indicated that elevating the role of women should be seen as a "normal" step as the church evolved, and saw the role of the church to be a place that "gave hope" and helped people "see the bigger picture".
