= Alfred Holland =

Alfred Holland may refer to:

- Alfred Holland (politician) (1900–1936), British Labour Party Member of Parliament 1935–1936
- Alfred Holland (bishop) (1927–2018), former Anglican Bishop of Newcastle in New South Wales, Australia
