= Anglican Diocese of Newcastle (Australia) =

Diocese of the Anglican Church of Australia

Coordinates: 32.5°S 151.5°E

Diocese of Newcastle
- Coat of arms

Location
- Country: Australia
- Ecclesiastical province: New South Wales
- Metropolitan: Archbishop of Sydney

Information
- Denomination: Anglican
- Established: 25 June 1847
- Cathedral: Christ Church Cathedral, Newcastle
- Language: English

Current leadership
- Parent church: Anglican Church of Australia
- Bishop of Newcastle: Peter Stuart; (since 2018)
- Assistant bishops: Sonia Roulston (Inland Episcopate, since 2018); Charlie Murry (Coastal Episcopate, since 2018)
- Dean: Katherine Bowyer; (since 2017)
- Archdeacons: Arthur Copeman (Archdeacon of Newcastle); Rod Bower (Archdeacon for Justice Ministries and Chaplaincy)

Website
- Diocese of Newcastle
- Logo of the Diocese

The Anglican Diocese of Newcastle in Australia is a diocese of the Anglican Church of Australia. The diocese is located in the state of New South Wales. It is centred in the city of Newcastle and extends along the state's coast from Woy Woy to Laurieton and inland to Merriwa and Murrurundi.

The diocese was founded from the Diocese of Australia by letters patent of 25 June 1847. The cathedral church of the diocese is Christ Church Cathedral in Newcastle.

The diocesan bishop is the Bishop of Newcastle. On 25 November 2017, Peter Stuart, the assistant bishop at the time, was elected as the diocesan bishop. He was installed at Christ Church Cathedral on 2 February 2018.

== Bishops ==
Bishops of Newcastle
| No | From | Until | Incumbent | Notes |
|---|---|---|---|---|
| 1 | 1847 | 1879 | William Tyrrell | Installed 26 January 1848; died in office. |
| 2 | 1880 | 1889 | Josiah Pearson | |
| 3 | 1890 | 1905 | George Stanton | Translated from North Queensland; died in office. |
| 4 | 1906 | 1919 | Jack Stretch | Previously Dean of Ballarat, coadjutor bishop of Brisbane and Dean of Newcastle; died in office. |
| 5 | 1919 | 1928 | Reginald Stephen | Translated from Tasmania. |
| 6 | 1928 | 1930 | George Long | Translated from Bathurst; died in office. |
| 7 | 1931 | 1958 | De Witt Batty | Previously Dean of Brisbane and coadjutor bishop of Brisbane. |
| 8 | 1958 | 1972 | James Housden | Translated from Rockhampton. |
| 9 | 1973 | 1977 | Ian Shevill | Translated from North Queensland. |
| 10 | 1978 | 1992 | Alfred Holland | Previously Assistant Bishop of Perth. |
| 11 | 1993 | 2005 | Roger Herft AM | Translated from Waikato and Taranaki; translated to Perth. |
| 12 | 2005 | 2012 | Brian Farran | Previously Dean of Rockhampton and an assistant bishop in the Diocese of Perth. |
| 13 | 2013 | 2017 | Greg Thompson | Translated from the Northern Territory. |
| 14 | 2018 | present | Peter Stuart | Previously Assistant Bishop of Newcastle. |

=== Assistant bishops ===
Robert Davies was assistant bishop in 1963 and became Bishop of Tasmania. Leslie Stibbard was appointed an assistant bishop in 1964, serving for ten years. Geoffrey Parker served 1974–1982 and died on 28 February 1997. Richard Appleby served 1983–1992 and became diocesan Bishop of the Northern Territory.

Graeme Rutherford (Graeme Stanley Rutherford) was consecrated a bishop on 4 November 2000 and served as assistant bishop for the Central Coast.

Peter Stuart was assistant bishop from 2009 until his 2018 election to the diocesan See, during which time he twice administered the diocese.

On 10 May 2018, Stuart consecrated Sonia Roulston and Charlie Murry as assistant bishops for the Inland and the Coast respectively.

== See also ==
- Newcastle School of Theology for Ministry
