= Bishop of Newcastle =

Bishop of Newcastle may refer to:

- Bishop of Newcastle (England)
- Anglican Bishop of Newcastle (Australia)

== See also ==
- Bishop of the Roman Catholic Diocese of Maitland-Newcastle, Australia
