= Peter Carnley =

Australian Anglican bishop

The Right Reverend Peter Carnley AC
- Archbishop of Perth
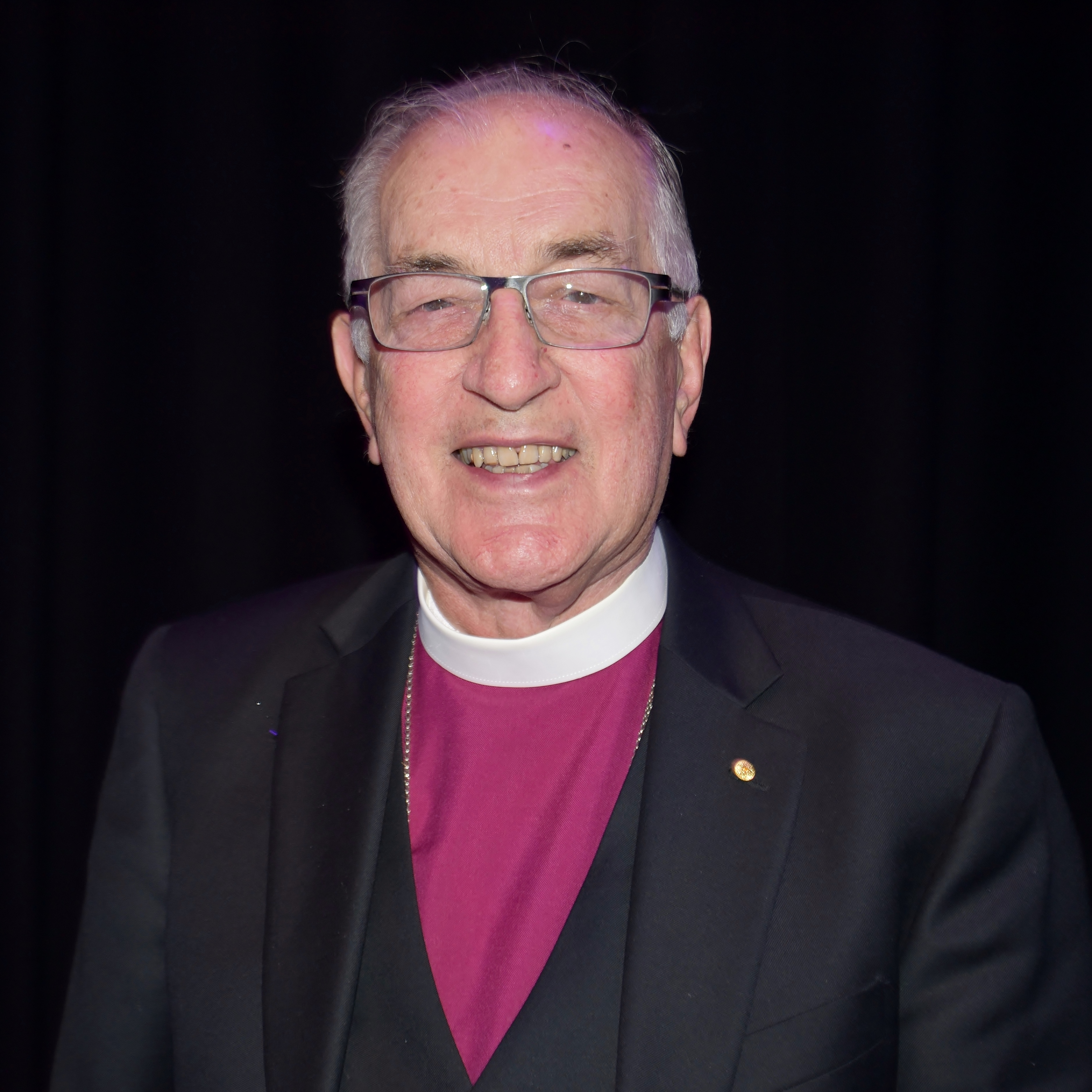
- Carnley in 2019
- Church: Anglican Church of Australia
- Province: Western Australia
- Diocese: Perth
- Installed: 26 May 1981
- Term ended: 26 May 2005
- Predecessor: Geoffrey Sambell
- Successor: Roger Herft
- Other posts: Metropolitan of Western Australia (ex officio); Primate of Australia; (2000–2005)

Orders
- Ordination: 1962 (as deacon); 1964 (as priest)
- Consecration: 26 May 1981

Personal details
- Born: Peter Frederick Carnley; 17 October 1937 (age 88) New Lambton, New South Wales, Australia
- Spouse: Ann Carnley
- Children: 2
- Education: Young High School
- Alma mater: Trinity College, Melbourne; Emmanuel College, Cambridge; St John's College, Cambridge

Peter Frederick Carnley AC (born 17 October 1937) is a retired Australian Anglican bishop and author. He was the Archbishop of Perth from 1981 to 2005 and Primate of the Anglican Church of Australia from 2000 until May 2005. He ordained the first women priests in Australia. In the 2007 Queen's Birthday Honours list, he was appointed a Companion of the Order of Australia. He is married to Ann Carnley. He also founded the Peter Carnley Anglican Community School.

== Education and teaching ==
Carnley was born in New Lambton, New South Wales. He trained for ordination at St John's College, Morpeth, and was ordained deacon in 1962 and priest in 1964. He studied in Australia at Trinity College, Melbourne, and in England at Emmanuel College and St John's College, Cambridge, and became warden of St John's College at the University of Queensland, as well as lecturer in theology at the University of Queensland, before becoming a bishop. As a lecturer in the 1970s he experimented with Process Theology. He holds many honorary doctorates and a Lambeth DD (2012) and is an honorary fellow of Trinity College (Melbourne), Emmanuel College (Cambridge) and St John's College (Cambridge).

== Ordination of women ==
Carnley was consecrated a bishop on 26 May 1981 at St George's Cathedral, Perth and installed there as Archbishop of Perth and Metropolitan of Western Australia in the same service. In the 1980s he supported the ordination of women and, on 7 March 1992, he ordained the first women priests in the Anglican Church of Australia at St George's Cathedral, Perth. His sermon on the occasion took as its reference an autobiographical piece by Charlotte Perkins Gilman entitled The Yellow Wallpaper. Carnley used Gilman's account of the self-destruction consequent on a "benignly prescribed, submissive, middle-class role" demanded of women in the 19th century to consider the "implications of the philosophy that women should "stay in their place, maintaining silence, concealing problems and repressing creativity". The yellow wallpaper of the title is what the imprisoned protagonist in Gilman's story peels off the walls as she goes mad. Carnley used it as a metaphor for the situation of the women who had been waiting to be allowed to become priests, saying: "Today, we are peeling away the sickly yellow, faded, silverfish-ridden wallpaper with which the church has surrounded itself and imprisoned women for centuries past in its benign and perhaps well-meaning determination to confine them by role."

== Ecumenism ==
From 2004 Carnley served as co-chair of the Anglican Roman Catholic International Commission (ARCIC II) seeking greater unity between the Roman Catholic Church and the Anglican Communion. He served as distinguished visiting professor in systematic theology at the General Theological Seminary of the Episcopal Church in New York City from 2010 to 2013.

In 2001, amid questions about the possibility of the church celebrating same-sex marriages, Carnley suggested that the church might be able to bless gay "friendships". Later, Carnley acknowledged that the consecration of American Bishop Gene Robinson created controversy in the church, but predicted that the church would not be irreparably split over the issue.

== Controversy ==
In The structure of resurrection belief Carnley outlines several different ways Christians frame their belief in the resurrection of Christ and the way the resurrection frames their faith. He explores notions of the resurrection as an historical event, as an eschatological event and as a non-event. He also explores the role of memory, presence and faith in believing in the resurrection.

When Carnley became the Australian primate, his views caused controversy with some, especially in the conservative Diocese of Sydney where Archbishop Harry Goodhew accused Carnley of breaching church doctrine and betraying the church's belief in the significance of the resurrection and of Jesus Christ himself. Others, including Phillip Jensen, Rector of St Matthias, Centennial Park in Sydney, objected to comments about how the Christian belief in the uniqueness of Christ had been misused to persecute people of other faiths. Some church leaders, especially within the Diocese of Sydney, called for a boycott of Carnley's installation as primate, but Archbishop Goodhew rejected such calls, which he said would be tantamount to severing relations with the rest of the church.

Carnley says he believes in the uniqueness of Christ: "I think Jesus Christ is the way, the truth and the life, but that doesn't mean that other religions don't have any truth at all." He also says he has an Easter (or resurrection) faith in the real presence of the living Jesus: "The Christian story, which pre-eminently transmits and celebrates the memory of Jesus and God’s revelatory deed in and through his life and death, should lead us beyond itself to a living encounter with the real presence of all that it celebrates and rehearses: him, whom by story we recall, we actually know as the living Spirit of the fellowship of faith." He also asserted that the resurrection is "the miracle of the Christian tradition".

== Books ==
- The structure of resurrection belief (1993, c1987) Oxford, [Oxfordshire]: Clarendon Press ISBN 0198267568
- The yellow wallpaper and other sermons (2001) Sydney, NSW: HarperCollins ISBN 1863717994
- Reflections in glass: trends and tensions in the contemporary Anglican Church (2004) Pymble, NSW: HarperCollins ISBN 1863717552

and a contributor to:

- Lost in translation? Anglicans, controversy and the Bible: perspectives from the Doctrine Commission of the Anglican Church of Australia (2004) edited by Scott Cowdell & Muriel Porter, Thornbury, [Victoria]: Desbooks ISBN 0949824402
- A Kind of Retirement, More Sermons from Archbishop Peter Carnley, Morning Star Publishing, Melbourne, 2016.
- Resurrection in Retrospect: A Critical Examination of the Theology of N. T. Wright, Cascade Books, Wipf and Stock, Eugene OR, 2019
- The Reconstruction of Resurrection Belief, Cascade Books, Wipf and Stock, Eugene OR, 2019

Anglican Communion titles
Preceded by Keith Rayner	Primate of Australia; 1999–2005	Succeeded by Phillip Aspinall
Preceded by Geoffrey Sambell	Archbishop of Perth; 1981–2005	Succeeded by Roger Herft
