= Anglican Bishop of Newcastle (Australia) =

Bishop of Newcastle
- Bishopric

anglican
- Coat of arms of the Diocese
- Incumbent: Peter Stuart since 2 February 2018
- Style: The Right Reverend

Location
- Country: Australia
- Ecclesiastical province: New South Wales

Information
- First holder: William Tyrrell
- Denomination: Anglicanism
- Established: 25 June 1847
- Diocese: Newcastle
- Cathedral: Christ Church Cathedral, Newcastle

Website
- Diocese of Newcastle

The Bishop of Newcastle is the diocesan bishop of the Anglican Diocese of Newcastle, Australia.

== List of Bishops of Newcastle ==
Bishops of Newcastle
No	From	Until	Incumbent	Notes
1	1847	1879	William Tyrrell	Installed 26 January 1848; died in office.
2	1880	1889	Josiah Pearson	
3	1890	1905	George Stanton	Translated from North Queensland; died in office.
4	1906	1919	Jack Stretch	Previously Dean of Ballarat, coadjutor bishop of Brisbane and Dean of Newcastle; died in office.
5	1919	1928	Reginald Stephen	Translated from Tasmania.
6	1928	1930	George Long	Translated from Bathurst; died in office.
7	1931	1958	De Witt Batty	Previously Dean of Brisbane and coadjutor bishop of Brisbane.
8	1958	1972	James Housden	Translated from Rockhampton.
9	1973	1977	Ian Shevill	Translated from North Queensland.
10	1978	1992	Alfred Holland	Previously Assistant Bishop of Perth.
11	1993	2005	Roger Herft AM	Translated from Waikato and Taranaki; translated to Perth.
12	2005	2012	Brian Farran	Previously Dean of Rockhampton and an assistant bishop in the Diocese of Perth.
13	2013	2017	Greg Thompson	Translated from the Northern Territory.
14	2018	present	Peter Stuart	Previously Assistant Bishop of Newcastle.

== See also ==
- Roman Catholic Diocese of Maitland-Newcastle
