= Newcastle School of Theology for Ministry =

The Newcastle School of Theology for Ministry was established in 2006 to provide theological education for the training and formation of lay leaders, deacons and priests in the Anglican Diocese of Newcastle. It ceased operation in 2014.
