= Alfred Holland (bishop) =

20th and 21st-century Australian Anglican bishop

The Right Reverend Alfred Holland
- Anglican Bishop of Newcastle
- Church: Anglican Church of Australia
- Diocese: Newcastle
- In office: 1978–1992
- Predecessor: Ian Shevill
- Successor: Roger Herft

Orders
- Ordination: 1952
- Consecration: 1972 by Geoffrey Sambell

Personal details
- Born: 23 February 1927 Shadwell, England
- Died: 8 October 2018 (aged 91) Sydney, Australia

Alfred Charles Holland (23 February 1927 – 8 October 2018) was an Australian Anglican bishop. He was consecrated as a bishop on 6 August 1972 and was an assistant bishop in the Diocese of Perth before becoming the diocesan Bishop of Newcastle in New South Wales from 1978 to 1992.

== Life and ministry ==
Holland was educated at St Chad's College, Durham and ordained at St Paul's Cathedral, London, in 1953. After a curacy in Hackney in London he became the parish priest at Scarborough, Western Australia, from 1954. While in Scarborough he was responsible for the building of St Columba's Church in Northstead Street, Scarborough. He was later the archdeacon of Stirling before his ordination to the episcopate.

During the Scarborough years, Holland developed an interest in art using charcoals and oils, and finally settling on acrylics as a medium in developing abstract art with religious and historical themes. He held an exhibition in Sydney in 2011.

Holland died on 8 October 2018.

== Episcopate ==
On 6 August 1972 at St George's Cathedral, Perth, Holland was consecrated a bishop by Geoffrey Sambell, Archbishop of Perth, and served as an assistant bishop in Perth from 1972 to 1977. During those years he travelled to Sydney each year to be a part of the Anglican Church of Australia's Liturgical Commission and its role in revising the prayer book. The result was An Australian Prayer Book 1978, the first of the modern prayer books now in use in Australia. He was also a prime instigator behind "Celebration '75", a week of events where the Perth diocese invited eight bishops from developing countries, including Desmond Tutu and Janani Luwum to preach and revitalise Anglicanism in Perth. The week culminated in a large outdoor Eucharist held at a local sport stadium which attracted around 10,000 people. It was also in this period that he led and spoke publicly at the moratorium marches against the Vietnam War.

An invitation to be Bishop of Newcastle was extended in 1977. One of Holland's first projects in Newcastle was to raise money for the building of the tower of Christ Church Cathedral which was completed in 1979. He was also responsible for the establishment of The Samaritans, now known as Anglicare Newcastle, the church's response to the high unemployment of the 1980s and Holland's concern for the vulnerable and disadvantaged. From time to time he would speak or write to Neville Wran (Premier of New South Wales, 1976-1986) expressing his concerns at the high unemployment levels and insufficient housing in Newcastle and the Hunter Valley.

Holland was responsible for the establishment of new parishes and new specialist chaplaincies were also created. He increased clergy stipends and improved their superannuation.

During the aftermath of the 1989 earthquake in Newcastle, Holland oversaw a number of building works, including the construction of Bishop Tyrrell Lodge at Morpeth. He also initiated the "Decade of Evangelism" in 1990. A strong advocate of the ordination of women, in Holland's time the Newcastle diocese was one of the first in which women were ordained in Australia.

== Royal commission findings ==
Holland gave evidence by video link to the Royal Commission into Institutional Responses to Child Sexual Abuse while it was sitting in Newcastle in August 2016. His evidence was that, as Bishop of Newcastle, he had not received any allegations that priests in the diocese had committed child sexual abuse and stated that there had not been any formal framework to deal with such accusations, so any case would have been handled in an ad hoc manner.

He denied receiving any complaint about sexual abuse by Father Peter Rushton of a 5-year-old son of a Newcastle diocese priest and the royal commission's finding on this allegation was that:

We are satisfied that in the early 1980s Bishop Holland was informed of an allegation that Father Rushton had sexually abused COE, the young son of an assistant priest in the Wallsend parish, COA. In 1980, Father Rushton was the local parish priest at Wallsend.
We are satisfied that soon after the incident COE's parents, COA and COC, together with their friends Mr Christopher Hall and Mrs Valerie Hall, met with Bishop Holland and reported the alleged abuse to him. Bishop Holland was dismissive of them and said that without further evidence he could take no action.
We are further satisfied that, when Father Rushton learned that Ms Pamela Wilson, a parishioner and friend of COE's parents, intended to complain to Bishop Holland about the alleged abuse, he telephoned her and threatened her with legal action if she pursued the complaint.
We accept the evidence of parishioner Ms Lesley Danger that she too raised the allegation with Bishop Holland. Bishop Holland told her that there was nothing he could do and that Father Rushton had threatened legal action.
It is not plausible that so many witnesses would give the same false account of disclosing the alleged abuse of COE to Bishop Holland. We do not accept Bishop Holland's evidence that he has no recollection of this matter.
We are satisfied that Bishop Holland failed to take any action to report or risk manage Father Rushton once he was made aware of the allegations. Also, Bishop Holland did not provide appropriate support to COE and his family after the allegations were made.

He denied any recollection of a report being made to him at the time about a priest and a lay reader in the church.

A lawyer who had advised the diocese for many years told the commission that "the then Bishop Alfred Holland had a "do-nothing approach" to matters of sexual impropriety."

In evidence before the royal commission, it was revealed that under Holland's watch the diocesan solicitor, Keith Allen, also defended a priest charged with child sexual assault. As part of that defence, Holland gave a reference for the defendant. Holland's evidence about this was that he did not know there was a criminal proceeding. On this point the Counsel Assisting the Royal Commission, Naomi Sharp, asked Holland:

Sharp: Bishop Holland, are you suggesting that, as the leader of your diocese, you would write a letter for one of your priests without having any understanding of what that letter was to be used for and what it was the priest was alleged to have done? Isn’t that seriously remiss of a person in the position of bishop of a diocese?
Holland: It could be said so, yes.
Sharp: Well, it is seriously remiss, isn’t it?
Holland: Yes, I think probably I should have taken more care.

The findings of the royal commission were that, by 1979, Holland had received child sexual abuse allegations from Aslin and Frost against Brown but that Holland did nothing, and that it took until 2012 for Brown to be convicted of sexually abusing 20 children, 13 of whom were abused after 1979. By 1980, Holland had received child sexual abuse allegations from COA, COC, Lesley Danger and Christopher and Valerie Hall against Rushton but again did not act, rather Holland promoted Rushton to the position of Archdeacon of Maitland in 1983. The royal commission found that Holland's failure to act in the face of the allegations was a lost opportunity to prevent future child sexual abuse.

== 'The Rose and The Fire' - A Biography of Alfred and Joy Holland ==
In March 2026, Connor Court Publishing released a biography of Alfred and Joy Holland, titled 'The Rose and The Fire', authored by their son Bishop Jonathan Holland.

The Book reviews Holland's career within the Anglican Church and re-examines the adverse findings made against him by the Royal Commission into Institutional Responses to Child Sexual Abuse (Case 42).

In the biography, the author argues that the Royal Commission misread Holland's character and contends that the available evidence was insufficient to support Royal Commission final conclusions.

== Family ==
Holland was married with four children, one of whom predeceased him. His son Jonathan Holland, also a bishop, was suggested as a candidate for Bishop of Newcastle in 2012.
