= De Witt Batty =

British-Australian bishop (1879–1961)

The Right Reverend Francis de Witt Batty
- 7th Bishop of Newcastle
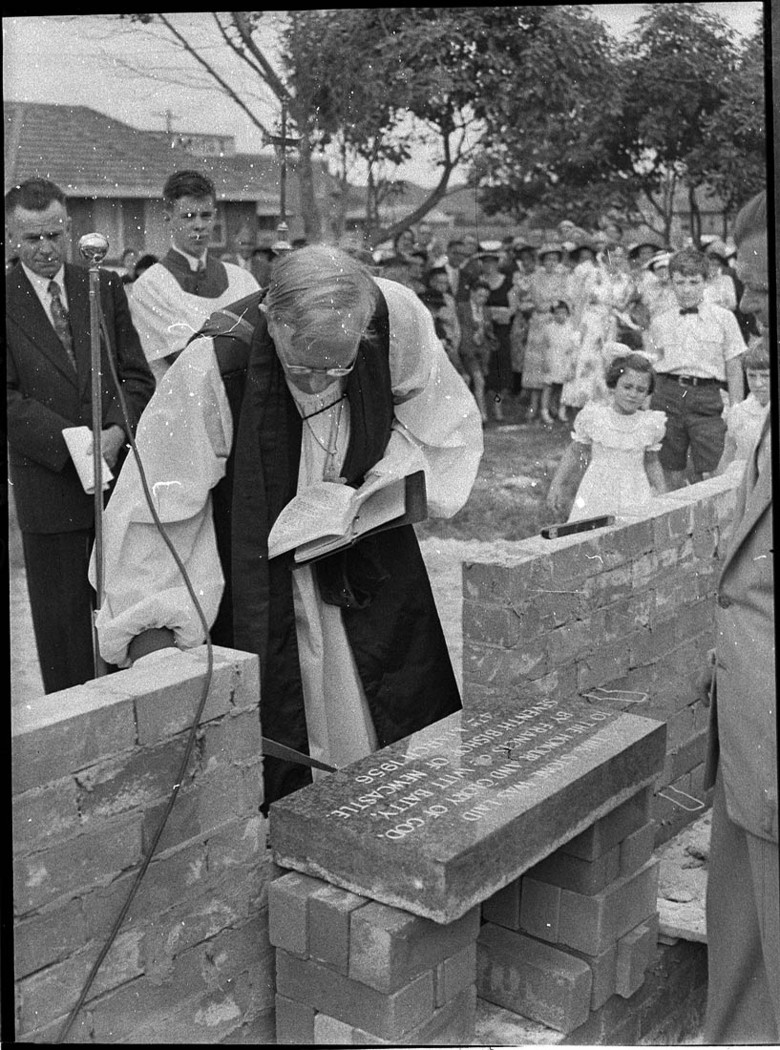
- Batty laying the foundation stone of St George's Church, Hamilton, in 1956
- Church: Anglican Church of Australia
- Province: New South Wales
- Diocese: Newcastle
- Installed: 3 March 1931
- Predecessor: George Long
- Successor: James Housden
- Other post: Dean of Brisbane

Personal details
- Born: 10 January 1879 London, England
- Died: 3 April 1961 (aged 82) Sydney, New South Wales
- Buried: St John's Anglican Cemetery, Morpeth
- Denomination: Anglicanism
- Education: Balliol College, Oxford

Francis de Witt Batty OBE (known as De Witt; 10 January 1879 – 3 April 1961) was the 7th Anglican Bishop of Newcastle in Australia from 1931 until his retirement in 1958.

== Early life ==
De Witt Batty was born in 1879, the son of the Rev William Edmund Batty and his wife Frances Beatrice, née Jebb, the daughter of Sir Joshua Jebb. He was named after his mother's ancestor, the Dutch patriot Johan de Witt. He was educated at St Paul's School, London and Balliol College, Oxford.

== Clerical career ==
Batty trained for ordination at Wells Theological College, and was ordained deacon in 1903 and priest in 1904. His first position was as a curate at Hornsey where he was asked a year later by the outgoing rector, St Clair Donaldson, to accompany him as his chaplain when Donaldson was appointed Archbishop of Brisbane. From 1909 to 1916 he edited the Brisbane Church Chronicle. In 1915 he was appointed a residential canon at St John's Cathedral, Brisbane and in 1925 the cathedral's dean. He was consecrated a bishop on 25 January 1930 by Gerald Sharp, Archbishop of Brisbane, to serve as coadjutor bishop of Brisbane. He once called his see "the most enviable diocese in Australia".

Batty retired to Double Bay, Sydney, and died on 3 April 1961. He was cremated and his ashes interred with William Tyrrell at St John's Anglican Cemetery, Morpeth. In his obituary in The Times, he was described as being "one of the most outstanding Englishmen ever to dedicate his life to public service in Australia".

Church of England titles
Preceded by George Merrick Long	Bishop of Newcastle (Australia); 1931 –1958	Succeeded by James Housden
