= Roger Herft =

Roger Herft AM
- Archbishop of Perth
- Church: Anglican Church of Australia
- Diocese: Perth
- In office: 2005–2017
- Predecessor: Peter Carnley
- Successor: Kay Goldsworthy
- Other post: Metropolitan of Western Australia (ex officio)
- Previous posts: Bishop of Newcastle; (1993–2005); Bishop of Waikato; (1986–1993)

Orders
- Consecration: 28 October 1986
- Laicized: 1 February 2022

Personal details
- Born: 11 July 1948 (age 78) Wattegama, Dominion of Ceylon (now Sri Lanka)

Roger Adrian Herft AM (born 11 July 1948) is a former bishop in the Anglican Church of Australia. He was the Archbishop of Perth from 2005 to 2017. He was previously the Bishop of Newcastle from 1993 to 2005 and the Bishop of Waikato in New Zealand from 1986.

Herft was removed from holy orders in February 2022, after the episcopal standards board of the Anglican Church of Australia determined in December 2021 that Herft had failed to address child sex abuse claims made against priests under his authority during his time as Bishop of Newcastle.

== Early life and education ==
Herft was born in Wattegama in what is now Sri Lanka (then the Dominion of Ceylon). He studied at the Royal College in Colombo, later training for the ministry at the Theological College of Sri Lanka in Pilimatalawa. He received Bachelor of Theology and Bachelor of Divinity degrees from the University of Serampore.

== Ordained ministry ==
After time in parish ministry and prison chaplaincy, he was invited by the Diocese of Waikato in New Zealand to become a parish consultant in 1983. In 1986, Herft was elected Bishop of Waikato, becoming one of the youngest bishops in the Anglican Communion; he was consecrated bishop on 28 October 1986.

Herft was elected Bishop of Newcastle, New South Wales, in 1992 and enthroned at Christ Church Cathedral in May 1993. He was chaplain of the 13th Lambeth Conference in 1998.

In 2004, Herft was elected as the seventh Archbishop of Perth and metropolitan of the Province of Western Australia and was installed on 11 June 2005, succeeding Peter Carnley.

Herft nominated Kay Goldsworthy as Australia's first female Anglican bishop and consecrated her at St George's Cathedral in Perth on 22 May 2008.

Herft was made a Member of the Order of Australia in 2013 for service to the church, particularly interfaith relations and social justice.

On 11 May 2016, it was announced that he would succeed Jack Nicholls as the next prelate of the Venerable Order of St John. Prior to this he was sub prelate of the order in Western Australia. On 1 September 2016, however, it was announced that Tim Stevens, formerly the Anglican Bishop of Leicester, had been appointed as the prelate.

== Royal Commission into Institutional Responses to Child Sexual Abuse ==
On 21 July 2016, the Australian Broadcasting Corporation (ABC), published an article which stated that "One of the nation's most senior Anglicans, the Archbishop of Perth, Roger Herft, received complaints about a priest involved in a paedophile ring but allegedly failed to formally report him to police." The article also says that "Archbishop Herft wrote that the complaint "left me in an unenviable position" because "Father Peter had my licence [to be a priest] and if he reoffended I would be held liable as I now had prior knowledge of his alleged behaviour." There is no record of Herft reporting the priest to police.

On 12 August 2016, Herft appeared before the Royal Commission into Institutional Responses to Child Sexual Abuse and was questioned about his policy in regard to the reporting and responses to allegations of abuse during his time as Bishop of Newcastle. Herft admitted that there had been no framework for dealing with accusations of child sexual assault during the first half of his tenure in Newcastle. He had written a policy called "Principles and Procedures for Dealing with Accusations of Sexual Harassment" in 1993, but this had not been prepared with child sexual abuse allegations in mind.

A record of a 1998 meeting between Herft and other church officials showed there had been concern about following up abuse allegations. Herft said that allegations would not have been followed up unless there was a formal written complaint. He agreed with the commission that this was "totally unacceptable" as it left children at risk.

The commission heard evidence that Herft had been informed of allegations against Graeme Lawrence who had been dean of Newcastle Cathedral. Herft reported that he had no recollection of specific allegations against Lawrence, who was later defrocked after having group sex with a teenage boy.

== Retirement ==
On 10 October 2016, Herft wrote a pastoral letter stating that he was standing down as archbishop to "focus my attention on the royal commission's ongoing inquiry into the Diocese of Newcastle". Herft said in the royal commission that he had "let down the people of Newcastle" and "let down the survivors in a way that remorse itself is a very poor emotion to express". Former premier Richard Court, chair of the Perth Diocesan Trustees, said that Herft "enjoyed the full support and respect of the Trustees of the Diocese of Perth". It was also reported that "there was a belief among some of the laity and clergy that [Herft] should have resigned".

On 15 December 2016, the Diocese of Perth announced that Herft would retire on 7 July 2017 and remain on accrued leave until that date. This would be a year earlier than previously anticipated. Herft thanked the royal commission for holding him "personally accountable" during the hearing. He stated that he had developed a "much more realistic view" of the priesthood and hoped first-hand accounts from survivors would lead to widespread change within the Anglican Church.

On 10 January 2017 an article in The Australian stated that in 1996 the Bishop of Ballarat at the time, David Silk, had employed a priest who had transferred from Newcastle when Herft was bishop. Allegations against the priest were reported to the Newcastle diocese in 1996 a few months after he had moved to Ballarat, and again in 1999. Silk said that Herft had not advised him of the allegations.

== Removal from holy orders ==
In September 2021, the episcopal standards board of the Anglican Church of Australia conducted a hearing about Herft's fitness to remain in holy orders. The board examined how Herft responded to sex abuse claims made by priests in the Newcastle diocese during his time as bishop (including a priest who was found by the Royal Commission into Institutional Responses to Child Sexual Abuse to be a prolific child sex abuser, another priest who had been charged with 24 child sex offences in 2017, and the former Dean of Newcastle, Graeme Lawrence, who had been convicted of assaulting a 15-year-old boy in 1991). Heft did not attend the board's hearing.

The board found that "[t]here were relevant protocols to guide, indeed impel, [Herft] to act in material respects, and additionally he had the capacity to call on the organs of the Church for resources, advice and support", and "there was always the straightforward medium of reporting allegations of serious criminal conduct to the police", but that "[Herft] did not do so when the position of authority he held demanded that of him". The board determined that Herft had failed to properly address claims made against these priests, that he was unfit to remain in holy orders and should be defrocked. Herft was removed from holy orders by Philip Freier on 1 February 2022.

== Family ==
Herft is married to Cheryl and they have two adult sons.

Anglican Communion titles
Preceded by Brian Davis	Bishop of Waikato; 1986–1993	Succeeded by David Moxon
Preceded by Alfred Holland	Bishop of Newcastle; 1993–2005	Succeeded by Brian Farran
Preceded by Peter Carnley	Archbishop of Perth; 2005-2017	Succeeded by Kay Goldsworthy
