= Geoffrey Sambell =

Geoffrey Tremayne Sambell CMG, Mention in Dispatches (28 October 1914 – 19 December 1980) was an Australian Anglican bishop and World War 2 army chaplain.

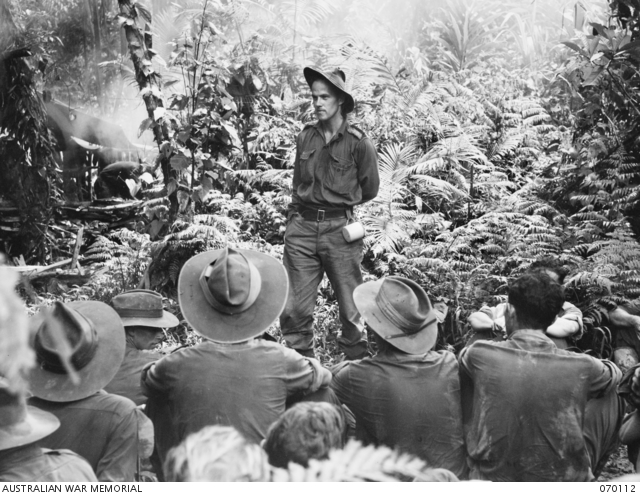
Ketoba, New Guinea, 1944-01-29. Padre Sambell, Unit Chaplain of 57th/60th Battalion, conducting an impromptu prayer meeting on a track near the Boku River.

Sambell was born on 28 October 1914 at Broadford, Victoria. He was educated at Melbourne High School and studied at The University of Melbourne. He was made a deacon in 1940 and ordained to the priesthood in early 1941. He began his ordained ministry in Malvern, Victoria, before enlisting in 1942 as an army chaplain, serving during World War 2 with the Second Australian Imperial Force in the jungles of the north western ranges of New Guinea (Service Number VX104114). He ministered first to soldiers of the 57th/60th Battalion which was raised in Victoria and then to the 2/11th Battalion raised from Western Australia. He was an extremely popular padre among the soldiers he served, and with whom he served. Sambell's studies at The University of Melbourne were interrupted by the war, and he graduated Bachelor of Arts after recommencing his studies (as so many did) after the war.

Following the war he became director of the Melbourne Diocesan Centre, Director of the Brotherhood of St Laurence. He was Archdeacon of Essendon, and then of Melbourne. He was Bishop Coadjutor of Diocese from 1962 to 1969 when he was elected Archbishop of Perth and Metropolitan of Western Australia, posts he held to his death.

Anglican Communion titles
Preceded by George Appleton	Archbishops of Perth; 1969 –1980	Succeeded by Peter Carnley
