= George Stanton =

Anglican bishop (1835–1905)

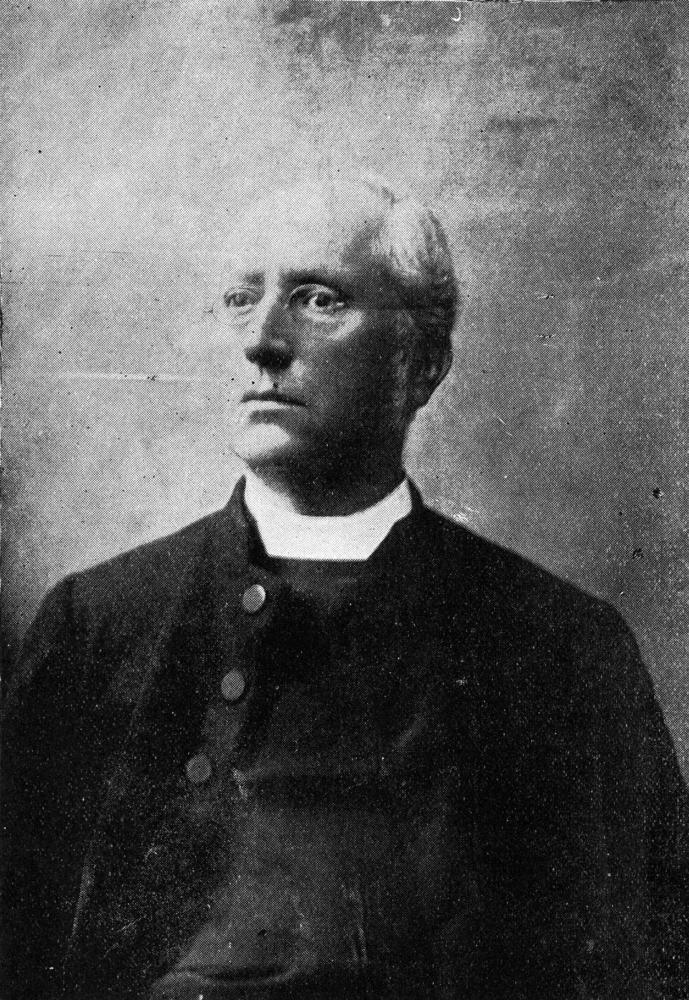
George Stanton, Bishop of North Queensland, c. 1905

George Henry Stanton (3 September 1835 – 4 December 1905) was an Anglican bishop in the second half of the 19th century and the early part of the 20th.

Stanton was born in Stratford, Essex, England and educated at Hertford College, Oxford graduating B.A. in 1858 and M.A. in 1862, receiving the honorary degree of Doctor of Divinity in 1878. He was ordained deacon in 1858 by Charles Sumner, Bishop of Winchester, and priest in 1859, and was Curate of Christ Church, Rotherhithe, from 1858 to 1862; of All Saints Church, Maidstone, from 1862 to 1864, of St. Saviour's, Fitzroy Square, London, from 1864 to 1867; and vicar of Holy Trinity, St. Giles-in-the-Fields, London, from 1867 to 1878.

Stanton was Vicar of Holy Trinity, Lincoln's Inn Fields He was consecrated a bishop by Archibald Campbell Tait, Archbishop of Canterbury, on the Feast of the Nativity of Saint John the Baptist 1878 (24 June) at St Paul's Cathedral. Appointed the inaugural Bishop of North Queensland in 1878, he was translated to Newcastle, NSW in 1890 and died in post on 5 December 1905.

Church of England titles
New title	Bishop of North Queensland; 1878 –1890	Succeeded by Christopher George Barlow
Preceded by Josiah Brown Pearson	Bishop of Newcastle (Australia); 1890 –1905	Succeeded by John Francis Stretch
