= Peter Stuart (bishop) =

British-born Australian Anglican bishop

The Right Reverend Peter Stuart
- Bishop of Newcastle
- Church: Anglican Church of Australia
- Diocese: Newcastle
- Installed: 2 February 2018
- Other posts: Assistant bishop, Diocese of Newcastle (2009–2018)

Orders
- Ordination: 1989 (as deacon); 1990 (as priest)
- Consecration: 2 February 2009 by Peter Jensen

Personal details
- Born: 1963 (age 62–63) England
- Denomination: Anglican
- Spouse: Nicki
- Children: 2
- Education: University of Tasmania (B. Comm); Melbourne College of Divinity (B. Div); University of Technology, Sydney (M. Management); Flinders University (D. Education)

Peter Derrick James Stuart (born 1963) is a British-born Anglican bishop in the Anglican Church of Australia. He has served as the bishop of the Diocese of Newcastle since 2 February 2018. He previously served as an assistant bishop in the diocese from 2009 to 2018.

Stuart has generated attention within the Anglican Church of Australia for his social justice activism. He supported the decriminalisation of abortion in NSW. He actively supported the LGBTIQA+ community in campaigns calling for an end to conversion practices. The Newcastle Diocese supports the blessing of people in same-sex marriages

Following the retirement of Brian Farran on 15 December 2012, until the installation Bishop Greg Thompson on 2 February 2014, Stuart administered the diocese. He resumed administration of the diocese on 1 December 2016 prior to Thompson's resignation as bishop on 31 May 2017 due to bullying. He was elected as the Bishop of Newcastle by the diocesan synod on 25 November 2017 and was installed on 2 February 2018.

Stuart was born in England in 1963, emigrating to Australia in 1971. He is a graduate of the University of Tasmania, the Melbourne College of Divinity (entering Trinity College Theological School in Melbourne in 1987), the University of Technology in Sydney and Flinders University. He was ordained deacon in 1989 and priest in 1990 in the Diocese of Tasmania. He served as principal of St Barnabas College, Adelaide from 2002 to 2009. He was consecrated as a bishop on 2 February 2009 by Archbishop Peter Jensen at Christ Church Cathedral, Newcastle.

Anglican Communion titles
Preceded by Greg Thompson	Bishop of Newcastle; 2018–present	Incumbent
