= William Tyrrell (bishop) =

The Most Reverend William Tyrrell
- 1st Bishop of Newcastle
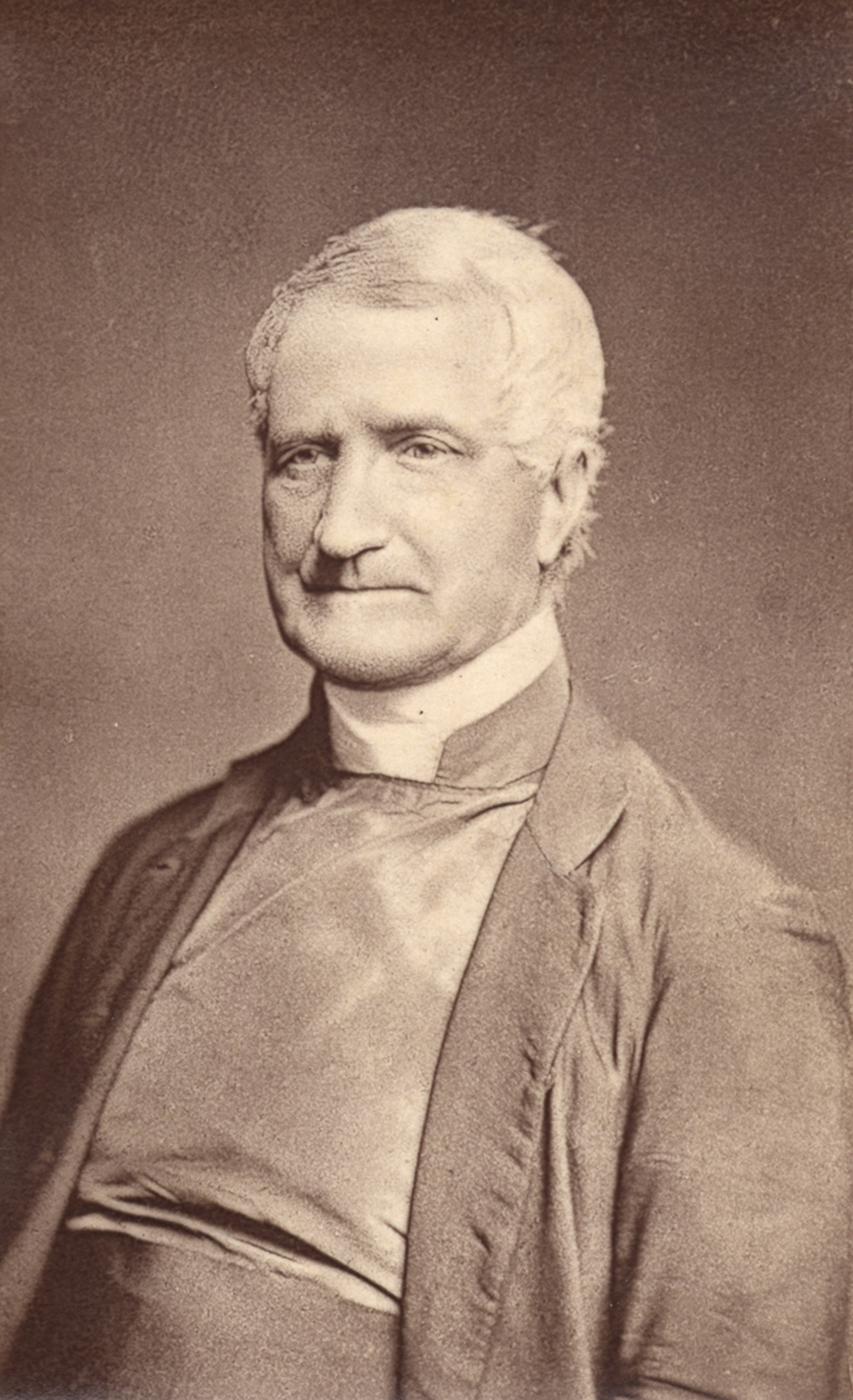
- Church: Anglican Church of Australia
- Province: Province of New South Wales
- Diocese: Diocese of Newcastle
- Installed: 31 January 1848
- Successor: Josiah Pearson

Orders
- Ordination: 22 September 1833
- Consecration: 29 June 1847

Personal details
- Born: 31 January 1807 London, England
- Died: 24 March 1879 (aged 72) Morpeth, Colony of New South Wales
- Buried: St Johns Anglican Cemetery, Morpeth
- Denomination: Anglicanism

William Tyrrell (31 January 1807 – 24 March 1879) was the first Anglican Bishop of Newcastle, New South Wales. He was ordained Bishop of Newcastle, a position that had just been created, in 1848 and served in this capacity until he suffered a stroke in August 1877 that left him partially paralysed. He died at Morpeth after an operation, on 24 March 1879. He was entombed at St John's Anglican Cemetery in Morpeth. In 1961, Francis De Witt Batty, the 7th Bishop of Newcastle's ashes were interred with Tyrrell.
