= Josiah Pearson =

Australian Anglican bishop

Josiah Brown Pearson (1841 – 10 March 1895) was the Anglican Bishop of Newcastle in New South Wales from 1880 until 1889.

Born in 1841 in Chesterfield, Derbyshire, Pearson was educated at Chesterfield Grammar School and St John's College, Cambridge. Ordained deacon in 1865 and priest in 1866 he held curacies in Cambridge as well as being a Fellow at St John's (1865-80). He lectured in moral science at St John's (1865-71) and was Hulsean lecturer in 1872. He held incumbencies at Horningsea (1871-74) and Newark (1874-80). In 1880 he became Bishop of Newcastle (Australia). Pearson struggled with the frontier-like nature of Australian dioceses, and when James Moorhouse was translated from Melbourne to Manchester in 1886, Pearson was offered and accepted an incumbency and assistant bishopric within the then vast diocese of Manchester. Pearson's mental health collapsed, and it was not until 1889 that he was able to complete his resignation as Bishop of Newcastle. By 1893 he was sufficiently recovered to become Vicar of St Peter's Church, Leck Lancashire.

His recovery was short-lived, and he died in 1895. In 1880 he married Ellen Tallents who died in 1925 aged 82 years .

Church of England titles
Preceded by William Tyrell	Bishop of Newcastle (Australia); 1880–1889	Succeeded by George Stanton
