= Jack Stretch =

Australian Anglican bishop (1855–1919)

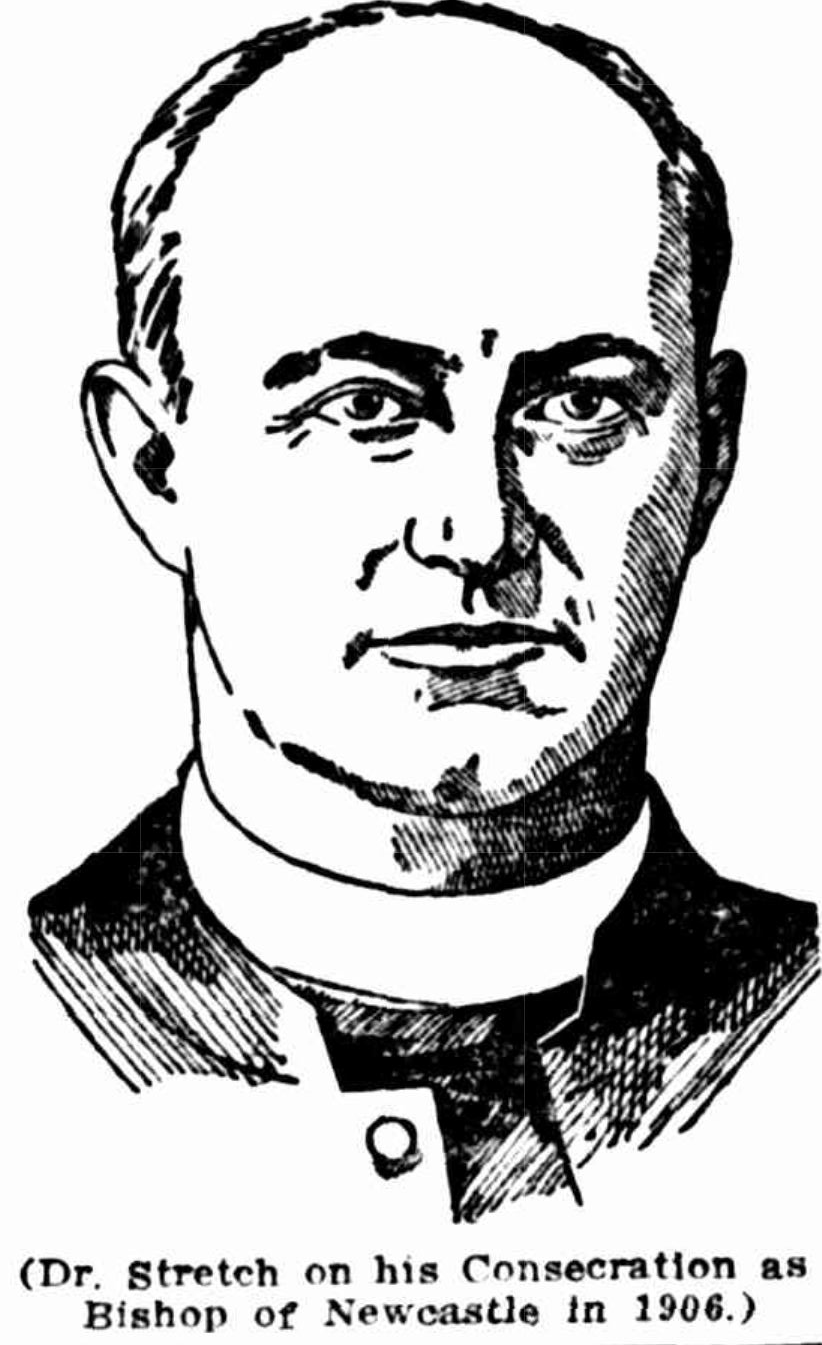
Bishop Jack Stretch on his consecration as Anglican Bishop of Newcastle, 1906

John Francis Stretch (28 January 1855 – 19 April 1919) was an Australian Anglican bishop.

== Early life ==
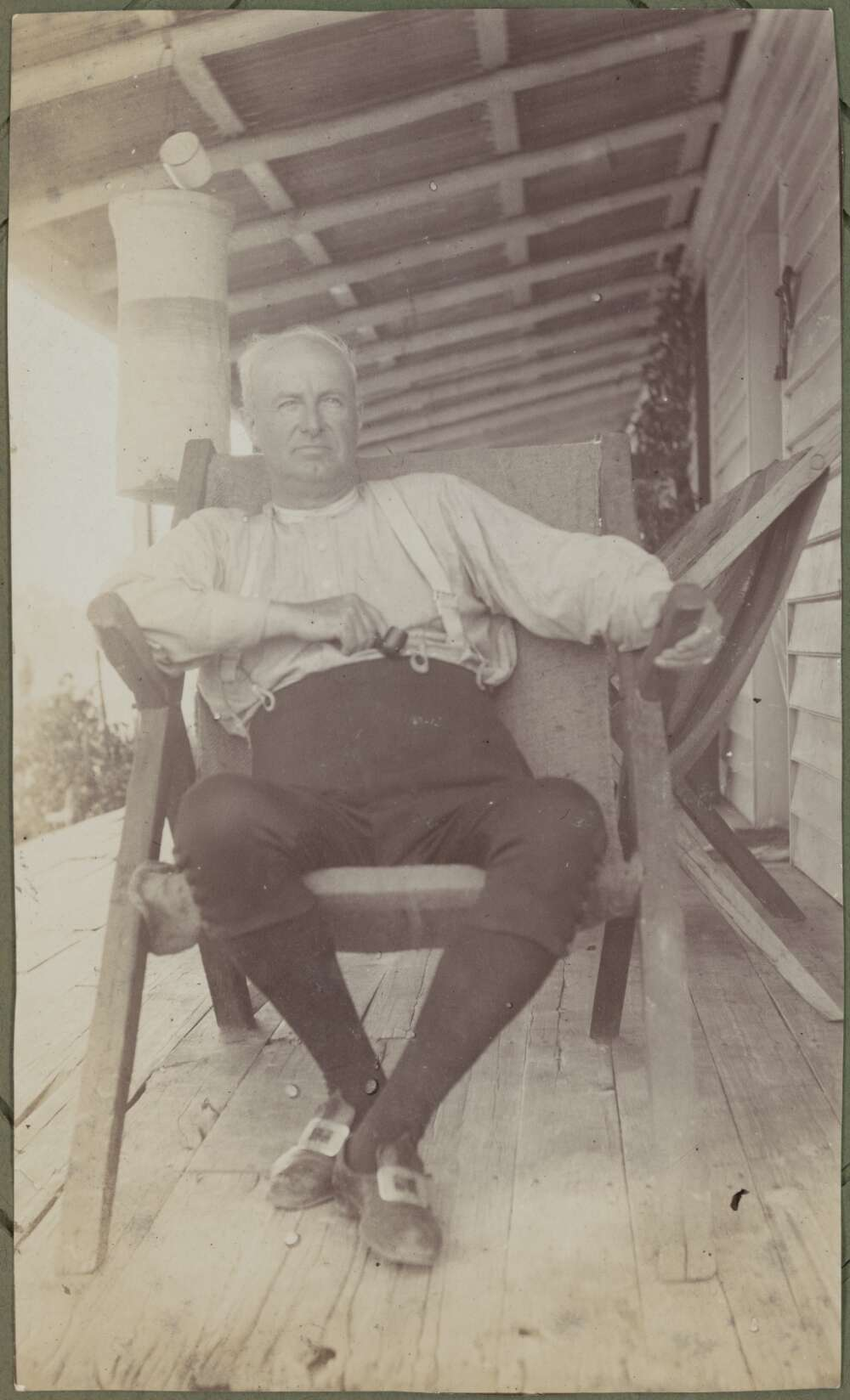
Bishop Stretch of Newcastle sitting on a porch, Dubbo Region, New South Wales, circa 1910

Stretch was born in Geelong, Victoria, the son of Reverend John Cliffe Theodore Stretch and his wife Frances (née Heath). He was educated at Geelong Church of England Grammar School. On 2 July 1872, he was the first student to enrol in Trinity College, Melbourne, which was the first residential college of the University of Melbourne. He graduated BA in 1874 and LLB in 1887.

== Religious life ==
Ordained in 1878, he began his ordained ministry as a curate in Geelong. In 1892, Stretch became vicar of St Andrew's Church, Brighton, Melbourne having previously served as incumbent of Holy Trinity Church in Maldon and St Mark's Church in Fitzroy. He was appointed to be Dean of Ballarat in 1894.

Stretch was consecrated as a bishop in 1895 as the first co-adjutor bishop for the Brisbane diocese. He was the first Australian to become an Anglican bishop in Australia. His consecration service (along with Henry Cooper who was made the coadjutor bishop for Ballarat) was held at St Paul's Cathedral in Melbourne on 9 November 1895 (the consecration was only the second occasion that such a service had happened in Australia at that time).

On Saturday 20 June 1896, he officially opened St Alban's Anglican church in Cunnamulla. Stretch was injured on his way to Cunnamulla, as he shot at a turkey from his buggy, frightening the horses, resulting in a crash with a tree stump. Although he sustained "serious contusions" to his forehead and hand, he was still able to perform the ceremony.

In 1906 he was made the Bishop of Newcastle in New South Wales.

== Later life ==
In failing health, Stretch announced his retirement on 24 January 1919 to officially take effect on 30 June 1919, but unofficially retired almost immediately. He died following a stroke on 19 April 1919 in Lindfield, Sydney, survived by his two daughters and four sons. His body was taken to Christ Church Cathedral in Newcastle, where his funeral service was conducted on Monday 21 April 1919 by John Wright (Archbishop of Sydney). After the funeral, there was a procession through the streets to the railway station. Stretch was buried in the Anglican section of Sandgate Cemetery, Newcastle with the burial service conducted by Archbishop Wright.

Two of his sons, John Carlos William and Cliffe Maurice Osmond, were also Anglican clergy.
