= Anglican Bishop of the Northern Territory =

Bishop of the Northern Territory
- Bishopric

anglican
- Coat of arms of the Diocese
- Incumbent: Greg Anderson since 29 November 2014
- Style: The Right Reverend

Location
- Country: Australia
- Ecclesiastical province: Queensland

Information
- First holder: Ken Mason
- Denomination: Anglicanism
- Established: 1 March 1968
- Diocese: Northern Territory
- Cathedral: Christ Church Cathedral, Darwin

Website
- Diocese of the Northern Territory

The Bishop of the Northern Territory is the diocesan bishop of the Anglican Diocese of the Northern Territory, Australia.

== List of Bishops of the Northern Territory ==
Bishops of the Northern Territory
No	From	Until	Incumbent	Notes
1	1968	1983	Ken Mason	
2	1983	1992	Clyde Wood AM	Later assistant bishop in Brisbane and, subsequently, Bishop of North Queensland.
3	1992	1999	Richard Appleby	Previously Assistant Bishop of Newcastle; later Assistant Bishop of Brisbane and, finally, bishop assisting the Primate of Australia.
4	1999	2006	Philip Freier	Translated to Melbourne.
5	2007	2013	Greg Thompson	Translated to Newcastle.
6	2014	present	Greg Anderson	Installed 29 November 2014.
