= Anglican Diocese of Wangaratta =

Diocese of the Anglican Church of Australia

Diocese of Wangaratta
- Coat of arms

Location
- Ecclesiastical province: Victoria
- Coordinates: 36°21′18″S 146°19′17″E

Information
- Rite: Anglican
- Cathedral: Holy Trinity Cathedral

Current leadership
- Bishop: Clarence Bester
- Dean: Ken Goodger; (since 2014)

Website
- wangaratta-anglican.org.au

The Diocese of Wangaratta is a diocese of the Anglican Church of Australia. It is situated in the north-eastern part of the state of Victoria, Australia. Its geographic remit includes the cities of Wangaratta, Albury-Wodonga and Shepparton. The cathedral is the church of the Holy Trinity in Wangaratta. The diocese was erected in 1902, when Thomas Henry Armstrong was installed as the first Bishop of Wangaratta. The current bishop is Clarence Bester who was enthroned in 2020.

== History ==
The diocese was founded in 1902.

In 2019, the diocese voted in favour of a motion authorizing a blessing rite for same-sex unions. In November 2020, the Appellate Tribunal, the church's highest court, ruled that a diocese may authorize blessing rites for same-sex unions, allowing the Wangaratta motion to go into effect.

== Cathedral ==
The cathedral church of the diocese is Holy Trinity Cathedral, Wangaratta. The land on which the church is built was donated to the parish by William Henry Clark, a pioneer of Wangaratta. The foundation stone was laid in 1908 by Bishop Arthur Green, the Bishop of Ballarat, and was dedicated on 24 August 1909. A second section was built between 1922 and 1924. The building was faced in locally quarried granite to a design by the English architect Walter Butler. The baptistery, designed by the church architect Louis Williams, was completed in 1965.

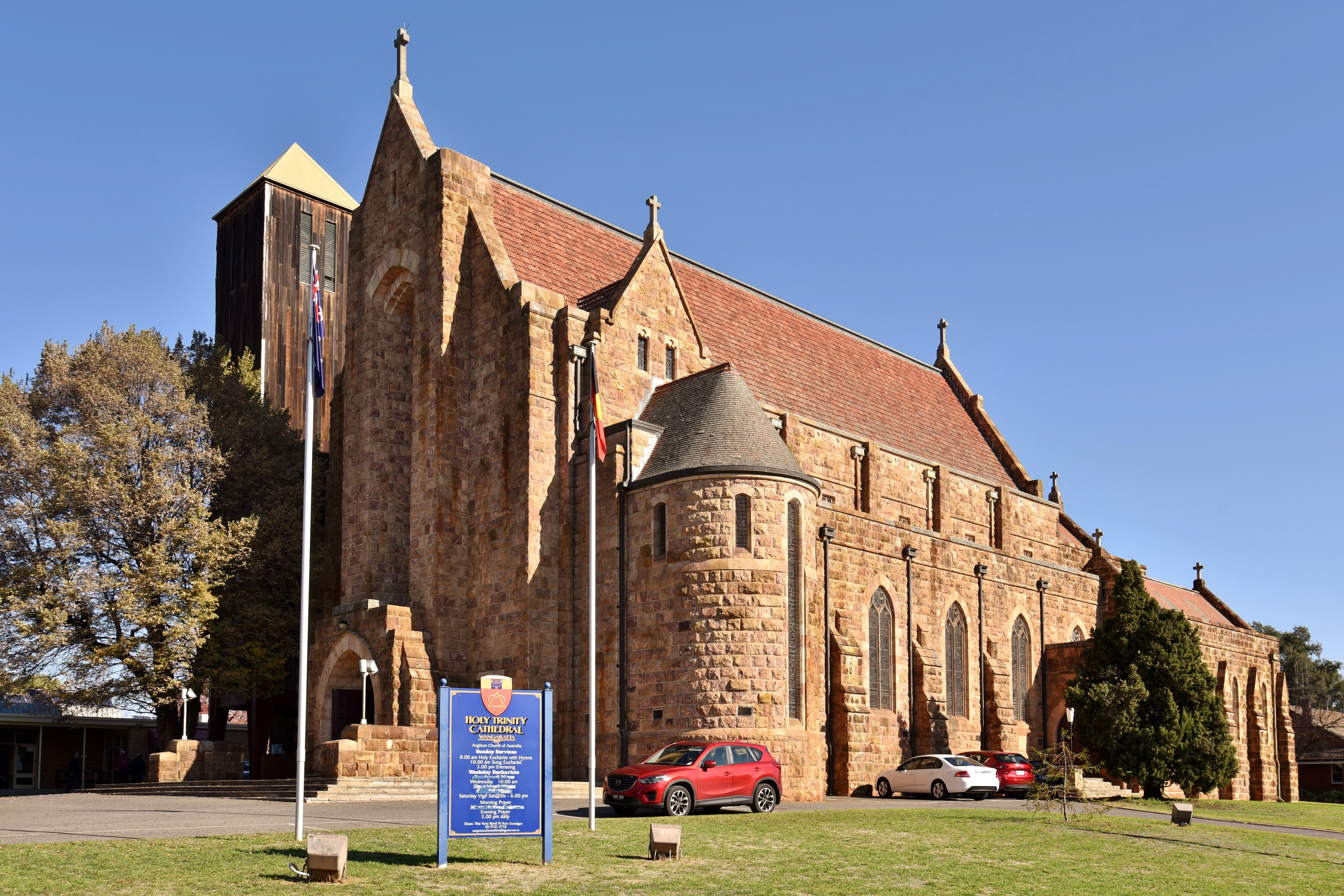
Holy Trinity Cathedral, Wangaratta

The cathedral houses eight change ringing bells. Cast in 1806 by John Rudhall, they are the oldest "complete" ring of bells in Australia. They were originally housed in St. George's Church, Bolton, and were first rung in 1987 once a tower had been built to house them. The current organ was built in 1902 by Henry Willis & Sons and is the fourth instrument to be housed in the cathedral.

== Deans of Holy Trinity, Wangaratta ==
The Rector of the Parish of the Holy Trinity, Wangaratta (the cathedral parish), is designated as Dean of Holy Trinity Cathedral.

- 1965 – 1972: Robert Beal (later Bishop of Wangaratta, 1985)
- 1972 – 1989: David Laurie Thawley
- 1989 – 1995: Donald McMonigle
- 1995 – 2003: Ray McInnes
- 2003 – 2013: Michael O'Brien
- 2014 – 2024: Ken Goodger

== Bishops of Wangaratta ==
Bishops of Wangaratta
No	From	Until	Incumbent	Notes
1	1902	1927	Thomas Armstrong	Consecrated 24 February 1902.
2	1927	1942	Stephen Hart	Previously Dean of Melbourne.
3	1943	1963	Thomas Armour	Previously Dean of Newcastle; died in office.
4	1963	1969	Theodore McCall	Translated from Rockhampton; died in office.
5	1969	1975	Keith Rayner AO	Translated to Adelaide, then to Melbourne; also later Primate of Australia.
6	1975	1985	Max Thomas	
7	1985	1994	Robert Beal	Previously Dean of Wangaratta and Dean of Newcastle.
8	1995	1997	Paul Richardson	Translated from Aipo Rongo, Papua New Guinea; later Assistant Bishop of Newcastle, England and, subsequently, a Roman Catholic priest.
9	1998	2008	David Farrer	Later a vicar in the Church of England.
10	2008	2019	John Parkes	Previously Dean of Brisbane.
11	2020	present	Clarence Bester	Consecrated 22 February 2020, enthroned 23 February 2020.
