= John Robert Gaden =

Australian religious leader (1938–1990)

John Robert Gaden (3 June 1938 - 27 January 1990) was an Australian priest and theologian, who came to prominence in 1976 for leading a campaign for the ordination of women in Australia.

== Early life and career ==
He was born in Leicester, England and emigrated to Australia as a child. He became a tutor in classics at the University of Melbourne in 1962, then studied theology and became a Church of England deacon (1963) and then was ordained as a priest (1964),

Gaden was assistant chaplain at Melbourne Church of England Grammar School (1972-73), chaplain at Monash University (1974-76), then became chaplain (1973-89) and secretary to the Anglican Church of Australia commission on doctrine (1975-89).

In 1977 he was appointed as director of Trinity Theological School and became the consultant theologian to the archbishop of Melbourne. He was president of the Australian and New Zealand Association of Theological Schools in 1981-84. From 1986 he was Warden of St Barnabas College, Adelaide.

== Ordination of women ==
Gaden wrote a discussion paper for the Movement for the Ordination of Women in which he stated,

From the above discussion there seems to be no compelling reason why our church should not move to take whatever constitutional steps are necessary to allow the ordination of women. More positively, there are good reasons both from the New Testament and from the history of the church which require us to act now so that the true diversity of God's ways of ministering may be known among us.

As a supporter of the ordination of women, Gaden was involved in some controversial events. Despite the support for the ordination of women by the relevant archbishops David Penman and Keith Rayner, Gaden had to make clarifying statements on both occasions. Preaching at an ordination service (of male clergy) in St Paul's Cathedral Melbourne in 1983, Gaden referred to the Holy Spirit as "she". Meanwhile, his wife, Janet Gaden, Moderator for the Movement for the Ordination of Women in Victoria, was quietly demonstrating with others outside the cathedral. Gaden had to make a statement about referring to the Holy Spirit as female. He finished his statement with this paragraph,

Some women are called by the Spirit of Christ, as are some men, to give birth to new Christians, to nurture and teach them. The Spirit blows where she will and distributes her gifts without respect of persons. God grant our church the same freedom to respond.

Before he took up the position of warden of St Barnabas, some priests submitted a petition objecting to his appointment, citing his extreme views on the ordination of women, his use of "she" as a pronoun for the Holy Spirit, his views on Holy Scripture, and on the ordination of protestant ministers.

In 1987, returning to Adelaide from the General Synod which did not achieve the two-thirds majority to agree to ordain women, Gaden decided to act as a deacon in solidarity with women. For a year he put aside his priestly roles of absolving, blessing and presiding at the eucharist.

John Gaden died suddenly on 27 January 1990. At his funeral, Bishop Max Thomas said, "as one who had contributed substantially through his writing on the women's debate, John's memorial would be the ordination of women."

Janet Gaden became one of the first women ordained as priest in 1992.

== See also ==
- List of the first women ordained as priests in the Anglican Church of Australia in 1992
