= Theodore McCall =

Australian Anglican bishop

Theodore Bruce McCall (29 December 1911 – 16 January 1969) was an Anglican bishop in Australia.

Born into a distinguished family, McCall was educated at St Peter's College, Adelaide and was an apprentice at Mercantile Marine (AUSNCo) until 1931. He studied for the priesthood at St Columb's Hall, Wangaratta, was ordained in 1936 and served first as a curate at Milawa. Later he was Rector of Yea and then a chaplain in the Second Australian Imperial Force. After World War II he was Rector of Macquarie and then Holy Trinity, Launceston. He was the Home Secretary of the Australian Board of Missions from 1953 until 1959 when he was consecrated a bishop on 2 February at St John's Cathedral (Brisbane) to serve as the sixth Bishop of Rockhampton, a post he held for four years. In 1963, he was translated as the Bishop of Wangaratta, and in 1969 he died while holding that office. His son, David McCall, was Bishop of Bunbury from 2000 until 2010.

Anglican Communion titles
Preceded by James Alan George Housden	Bishop of Rockhampton; 1959–1963	Succeeded by Donald Norman Shearman
Preceded by Thomas Makinson Armour	Bishop of Wangaratta; 1963–1969	Succeeded by Keith Rayner
