= John Parkes (bishop) =

Australian Anglican clergyman (1950–2025)

The Right Reverend John Parkes AM
- Bishop of Wangaratta
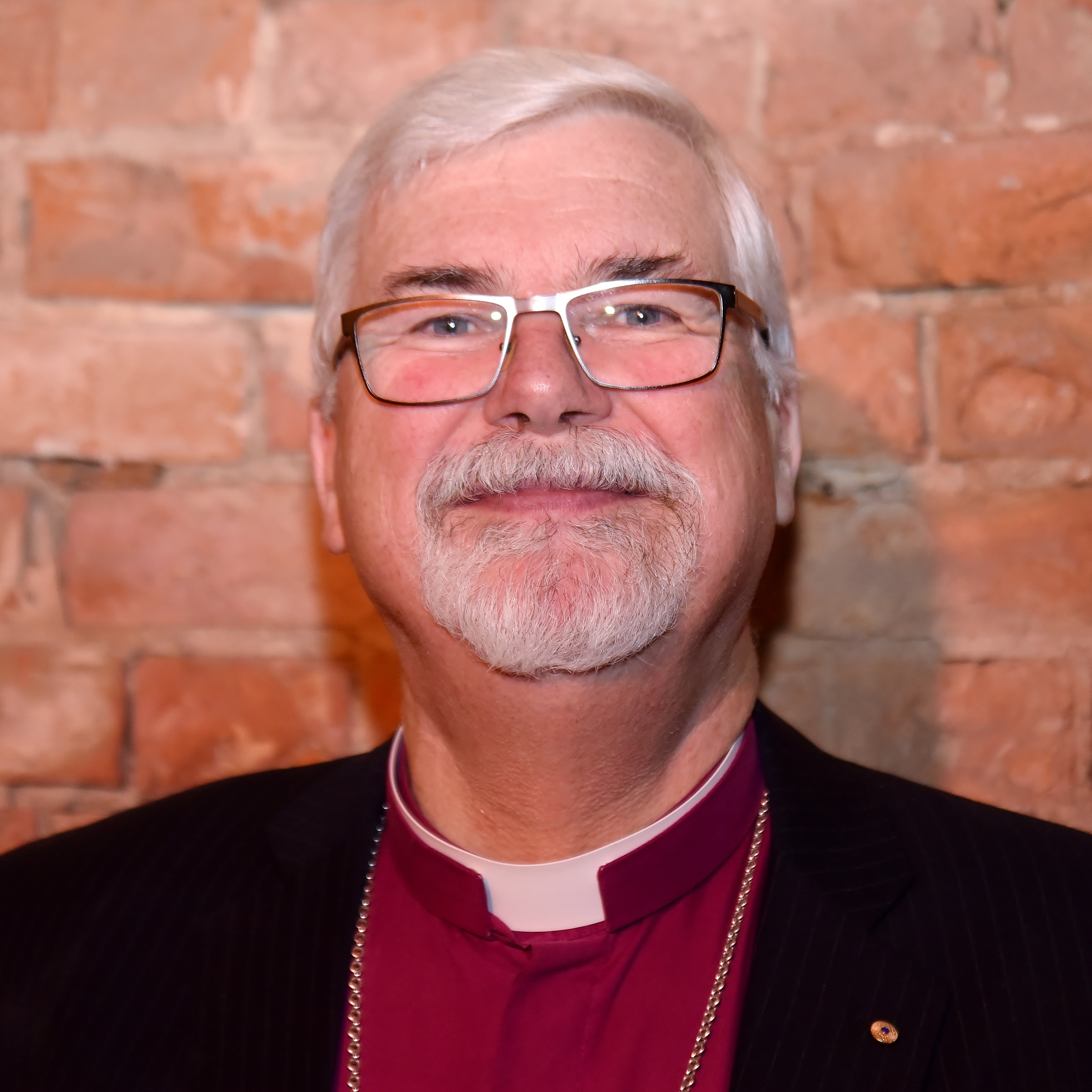
- Parkes in 2019
- Church: Anglican Church of Australia
- Diocese: Wangaratta
- In office: 2008–2019
- Predecessor: David Farrer
- Successor: Clarence Bester
- Other posts: Assistant bishop in the Diocese of Brisbane; Dean of Brisbane

Personal details
- Born: Anthony John Parkes; 6 August 1950 United Kingdom
- Died: 3 July 2025 (aged 74)
- Denomination: Anglicanism
- Spouse: Margaret
- Children: 2
- Education: University of Sheffield; St Mark's National Theological Centre

Anthony John Parkes (6 August 1950 – 3 July 2025) was a British-born Australian Anglican bishop. He was the tenth Bishop of Wangaratta from 2008 to 2019.

== Biography ==
Parkes was born in the United Kingdom in 1950 and educated as a lawyer at the University of Sheffield. He moved to Australia and worked as a barrister and solicitor in Sydney prior to beginning training for ordination in 1986. He was rector of All Saints' Church in Ainslie (1998–2004) and was also a former barrister where he served on the General Synod Standing Committee and the Church Law Commission.

Prior to his election in Wangaratta, Parkes served as an assistant bishop and the dean of Brisbane in the Diocese of Brisbane. He was a finalist in the first 2006 election for Archbishop of Melbourne.

Parkes was installed as Bishop of Wangaratta on 13 December 2008.

Parkes, as a supporter of same-sex marriage, was criticised within the church for his stance. In December 2017, Parkes organised Anglican bishops to write to federal members of parliament, seeking that they pass the Marriage Amendment (Definition and Religious Freedoms) Bill 2017, same-sex marriage legislation without stronger religious exemptions.

Parkes retired on 21 December 2019, and was replaced as Bishop of Wangaratta by Clarence Bester. After a long battle with illness, Parkes died on 3 July 2025, at the age of 74.

Anglican Communion titles
Preceded by David Farrer	Bishop of Wangaratta; 2008–2019	Succeeded by Clarence Bester
