= Anglican Bishop of Wangaratta =

Bishop of Wangaratta
- Bishopric

anglican
- Coat of arms of the Diocese
- Incumbent: Clarence Bester since 23 February 2020
- Style: The Right Reverend

Location
- Country: Australia
- Ecclesiastical province: Victoria
- Residence: Bishop's Lodge, Wangaratta

Information
- First holder: Thomas Armstrong
- Denomination: Anglican
- Established: 24 February 1902
- Diocese: Wangaratta
- Cathedral: Holy Trinity Cathedral, Wangaratta

Website
- Diocese of Wangaratta

The Bishop of Wangaratta is the diocesan bishop of the Anglican Diocese of Wangaratta, Australia.

== List of Bishops of Wangaratta ==
Bishops of Wangaratta
No	From	Until	Incumbent	Notes
1	1902	1927	Thomas Armstrong	Consecrated 24 February 1902.
2	1927	1942	Stephen Hart	Previously Dean of Melbourne.
3	1943	1963	Thomas Armour	Previously Dean of Newcastle; died in office.
4	1963	1969	Theodore McCall	Translated from Rockhampton; died in office.
5	1969	1975	Keith Rayner AO	Translated to Adelaide, then to Melbourne; also later Primate of Australia.
6	1975	1985	Max Thomas	
7	1985	1994	Robert Beal	Previously Dean of Wangaratta and Dean of Newcastle.
8	1995	1997	Paul Richardson	Translated from Aipo Rongo, Papua New Guinea; later Assistant Bishop of Newcastle, England and, subsequently, a Roman Catholic priest.
9	1998	2008	David Farrer	Later a vicar in the Church of England.
10	2008	2019	John Parkes	Previously Dean of Brisbane.
11	2020	present	Clarence Bester	Consecrated 22 February 2020, enthroned 23 February 2020.
