= Bishop of Wangaratta =

Bishop of Wangaratta may refer to:

- Anglican Bishop of Wangaratta
- Bishop of the Roman Catholic Diocese of Sandhurst
