= Harold Graham =

Australian Archdeacon

Harold Alfred Douglas Graham was an Australian Archdeacon in the 20th century.

Graham was educated at St Columb's Hall, Wangaratta and ordained in 1938. He served curacies in Wangaratta, Junee and Forbes. He was Rector of Nagambie from 1941 to 1942; and then a Chaplain in the AIF. He became Rector of Wellington in 1943. He was in charge of three archdeaconries in the Diocese of Bathurst: Marsden (1954-1961); Barker (1961-1965): Long (1965-1968); and then Marsden again (1968-1971).
