= Archbishop of Melbourne =

Archbishop of Melbourne may refer to:

- Anglican Archbishop of Melbourne
- Roman Catholic Archbishop of Melbourne
