= Peter Watson (bishop) =

Australian retired Anglican bishop (born 1936)

The Right Reverend Peter Watson
- Archbishop of Melbourne
- Church: Anglican Church of Australia
- Province: Victoria
- Diocese: Melbourne
- In office: 2000–2005
- Predecessor: Keith Rayner
- Successor: Philip Freier
- Previous posts: Bishop of Parramatta (1989–1993); Bishop of South Sydney (1993–2000)

Personal details
- Born: Peter Robert Watson; 1936 (age 89–90) Sydney, Australia
- Denomination: Anglicanism
- Spouse: Margot (Eleanor)

Peter Robert Watson (born 1936) is a retired Australian Anglican bishop. He served as the Anglican Archbishop of Melbourne from 2000 to 2005.

== Biography ==
Watson was born in Sydney in 1936. He attended Canterbury Boys' High School. He was ordained as a priest in Sydney in 1962 and consecrated as the Bishop of Parramatta (in Sydney) in 1989 and became Bishop of South Sydney in 1993.

In 2000 he was elected to succeed Keith Rayner as Archbishop of Melbourne and was installed on 14 May 2000. He retired as archbishop effective 31 December 2005. He is married to Margo (Eleanor) Watson.
