= Paul Richardson (priest) =

British Roman Catholic priest and former Anglican bishop

The Reverend Fr Paul Richardson
- Assistant Bishop of Newcastle (Anglican)
- Diocese: Diocese of Newcastle (Anglican)
- In office: 1998–2010
- Predecessor: Ken Gill
- Successor: Frank White
- Other posts: Roman Catholic priest (c. 2011–present); Anglican Bishop of Wangaratta (1995–1997); Anglican Bishop of Aipo Rongo (1987–1995)

Orders
- Ordination: 1972 (deacon); 1973 (priest)
- Consecration: 1987

Personal details
- Born: 16 January 1947 (age 79)
- Denomination: Anglican (to 2010); Roman Catholic (from 2010)
- Parents: William and Ilene
- Education: The Queen's College, Oxford

Paul Richardson (born 16 January 1947) is a British Roman Catholic priest and a former Anglican bishop.

== Early life ==
Richardson was educated at Keswick School, The Queen's College, Oxford, Harvard Divinity School and Cuddesdon Theological College.

== Anglican ministry ==
He was ordained a priest in the Church of England in 1973 and served first as a curate at St John's Earlsfield, London. He was then the assistant chaplain in Oslo, Norway, and then a mission priest at Nambaiyfa in the highlands of Papua New Guinea before becoming the principal of Newton Theological College, Popondetta, and then the dean of St John's Cathedral, Port Moresby.

He was the Bishop of Aipo Rongo in the Anglican Church of Papua New Guinea from 1987 to 1995 when he was translated to the Diocese of Wangaratta in the Anglican Church of Australia. From 1998 to 16 January 2010 he was the Assistant Bishop of Newcastle in the Church of England.

== Roman Catholic ministry ==
In January 2010, Richardson was received into the Roman Catholic Church. He was ordained as a Roman Catholic priest in 2011.

Anglican Communion titles
Preceded by Robert Beal	Bishop of Wangaratta; 1995–1997	Succeeded by David Farrer
Church of England titles
Preceded by Ken Gill	Assistant Bishop of Newcastle; 1998–2010	Succeeded by Frank White
