= Richard Appleby (bishop) =

Australian Anglican bishop

Richard Franklin Appleby (born 17 November 1940) is a retired Australian Anglican bishop.

Appleby was educated at the University of Melbourne. Ordained in 1967, his first posts were curacies in Glenroy and North Balwyn. He was then warden of Wollaston College and chaplain to the Archbishop of Perth. From 1975 he was rector of Belmont and then Dean of Bathurst (1980–1983). From his consecration as a bishop on 2 February 1983 to 1992 he was Assistant Bishop of Newcastle; then he became diocesan Bishop of the Northern Territory until 1999; he served as an Assistant Bishop of Brisbane for the Northern Region, until 5 February 2006; and finally as Bishop Assisting the Primate of Australia. He is married to Elizabeth Appleby.

On 19 February 2019, the Professional Standards Tribunal of the Newcastle diocese recommended that Appleby be removed from holy orders as a result of his failure to protect children after being informed of instances of child sexual abuse in the 1980s and '90s. However, a review board determined that Appleby had been denied procedural fairness in the decision. Appleby has stated that he has no memory of being informed about child sexual abuse in the diocese.

Anglican Communion titles
Preceded by Clyde Maurice Wood	Bishop of the Northern Territory; 1992 –1999	Succeeded by Philip Leslie Freier
