= John Noble (bishop) =

Australian Anglican bishop

John Ashley Noble (born 30 March 1944) is a retired Australian Anglican bishop.

Noble was educated at St Francis Theological College, Brisbane and the University of Queensland. He was ordained in 1968 and combined a career as a teacher with a ministry as a school chaplain until 1982. He then held incumbencies at St John's Dalby and St Barnabas’ Sunnybank. From 1989 to 1993 he was a lecturer at St Francis' Theological College and then, on 29 June 1993, he was consecrated a bishop, to serve as an assistant bishop of the northern region of the Diocese of Brisbane. He became Bishop of North Queensland in 2002, a position he held until 2007.

Religious titles
Preceded by Clyde Maurice Wood	Bishop of North Queensland; 2002 –2007	Succeeded by William James Ray
