= Christ Church Cathedral, Newcastle =

Christ Church Cathedral
- Cathedral Church of Christ the King
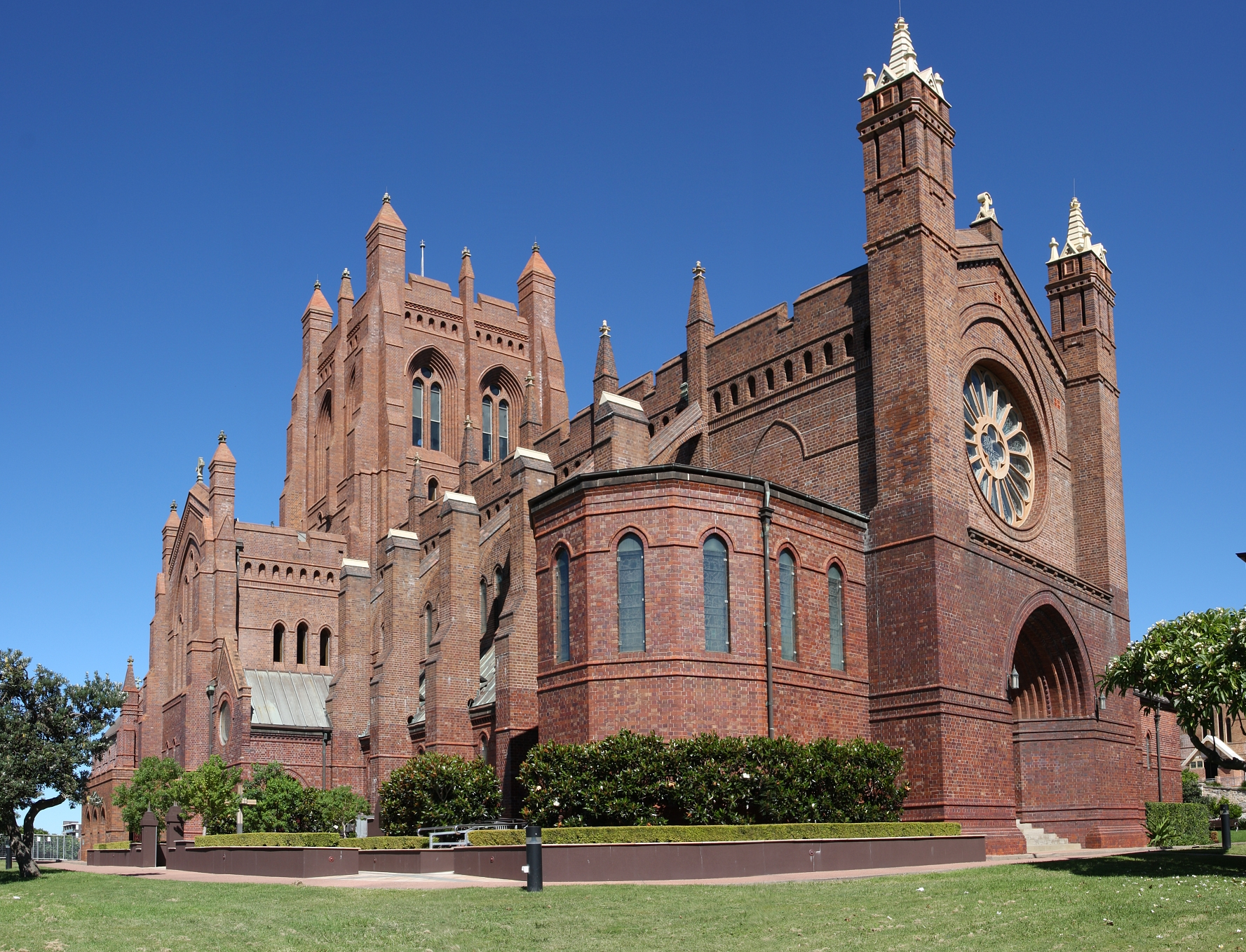
- Cathedral in 2012

- Location in New South Wales
- 32°55′47″S 151°46′50″E
- Location: Church Street, The Hill, Newcastle, New South Wales
- Country: Australia
- Denomination: Anglican
- Website: newcastlecathedral.org.au

History
- Status: Cathedral
- Founded: 1847
- Dedicated: 21 November 1902
- Consecrated: 20 November 1983 by Bishop Holland
- Events: Tower added 1979; Earthquake damage 1989

Architecture
- Functional status: Active
- Architects: John Horbury Hunt; Frederick George Castleden
- Architectural type: Cathedral
- Style: Gothic Revival
- Groundbreaking: 1883
- Completed: 1902

Specifications
- Capacity: 1,000
- Length: 72.5 metres (238 ft)
- Width: 25.6 metres (84 ft)

Administration
- Province: New South Wales
- Diocese: Newcastle

Clergy
- Dean: (vacant)

The Cathedral Church of Christ the King, also called Christ Church Cathedral, is an Anglican cathedral in Newcastle, New South Wales. It is the cathedral church of the Diocese of Newcastle in the Anglican Church of Australia. The building, designed by John Horbury Hunt in the Gothic Revival style, is located on a hill at the city's eastern end in the suburb called The Hill. It was added to the New South Wales State Heritage Register on 28 June 2011.

== History ==
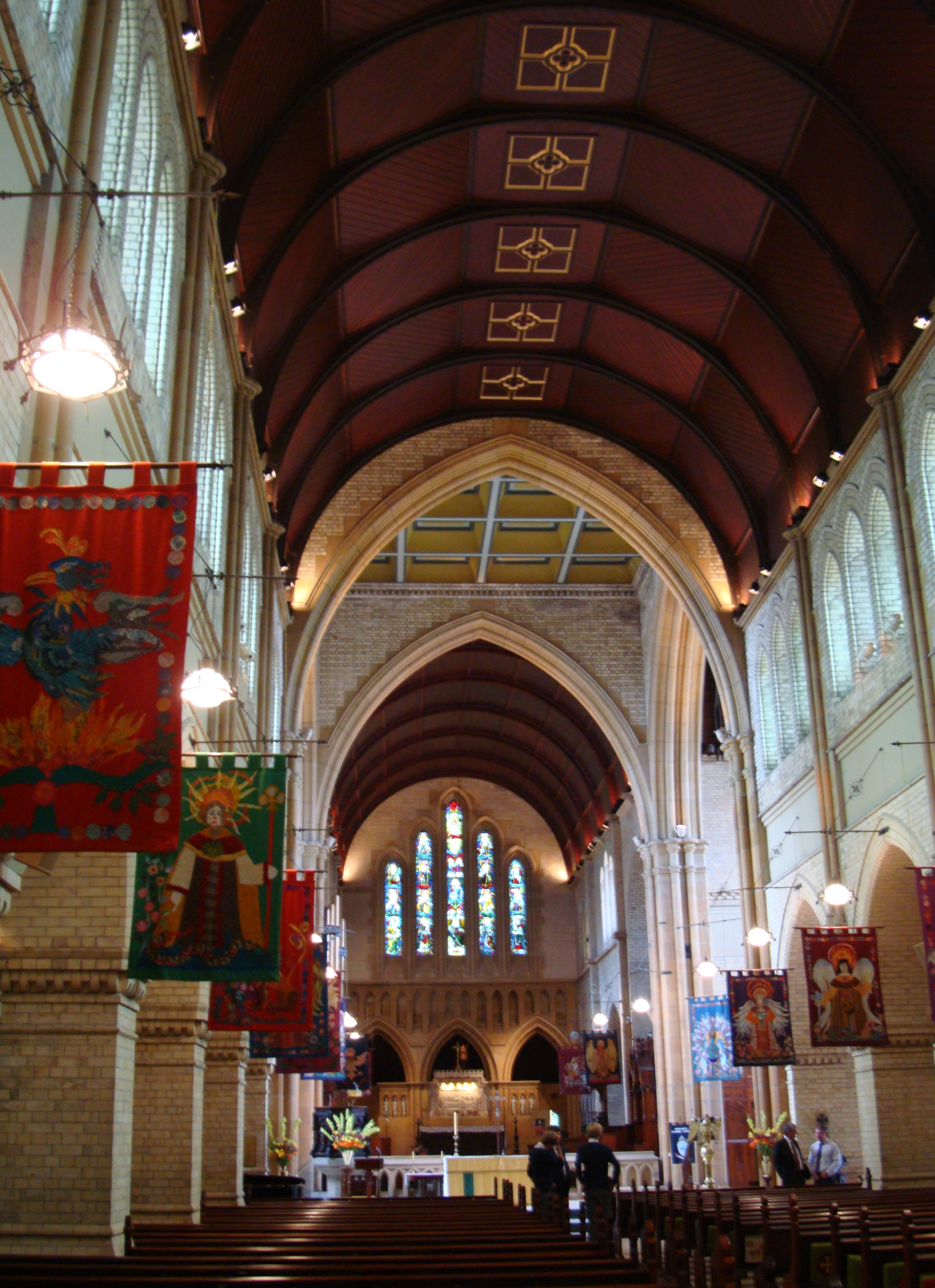
Cathedral interior

=== Development of the Anglican Church in Newcastle ===
The ground on which Christ Church Cathedral stands has been the site of at least one other church: Christ Church, built in 1817–18. Unlike the rushed construction of Christ Church, the building of Christ Church Cathedral was a long and complicated process; it was exactly one hundred years from the beginning of construction to its consecration. John Horbury Hunt was the principal architect involved in the project, with other prominent Newcastle architects also contributing to its design.

The first known church on this site was built on the order of Governor Lachlan Macquarie to provide services for the civil and military officials and convicts who were posted there. The population of Newcastle had swelled following the closure of Norfolk Island as a penal settlement in 1814, making this need more pressing. Christ Church School, the first school in Newcastle, operated from the church vestry from mid-1818 to the early 1830s.

Probably because of a combination of the haste of Christ Church's construction on a sandy site, the use of salt-impregnated sandstone quarried locally, and the largely unskilled convict labour employed, the strong winds which constantly buffeted its hilltop location so close to the sea soon exposed structural flaws in the foundations. Several years after its completion, the upper tower and the steeple were taken down because of instability. It remained in this form for a period of 43 years. With the establishment of the Diocese of Newcastle in 1847, Newcastle officially became a city, Christ Church became a cathedral and the first bishop, William Tyrrell (1848-1879), was appointed.

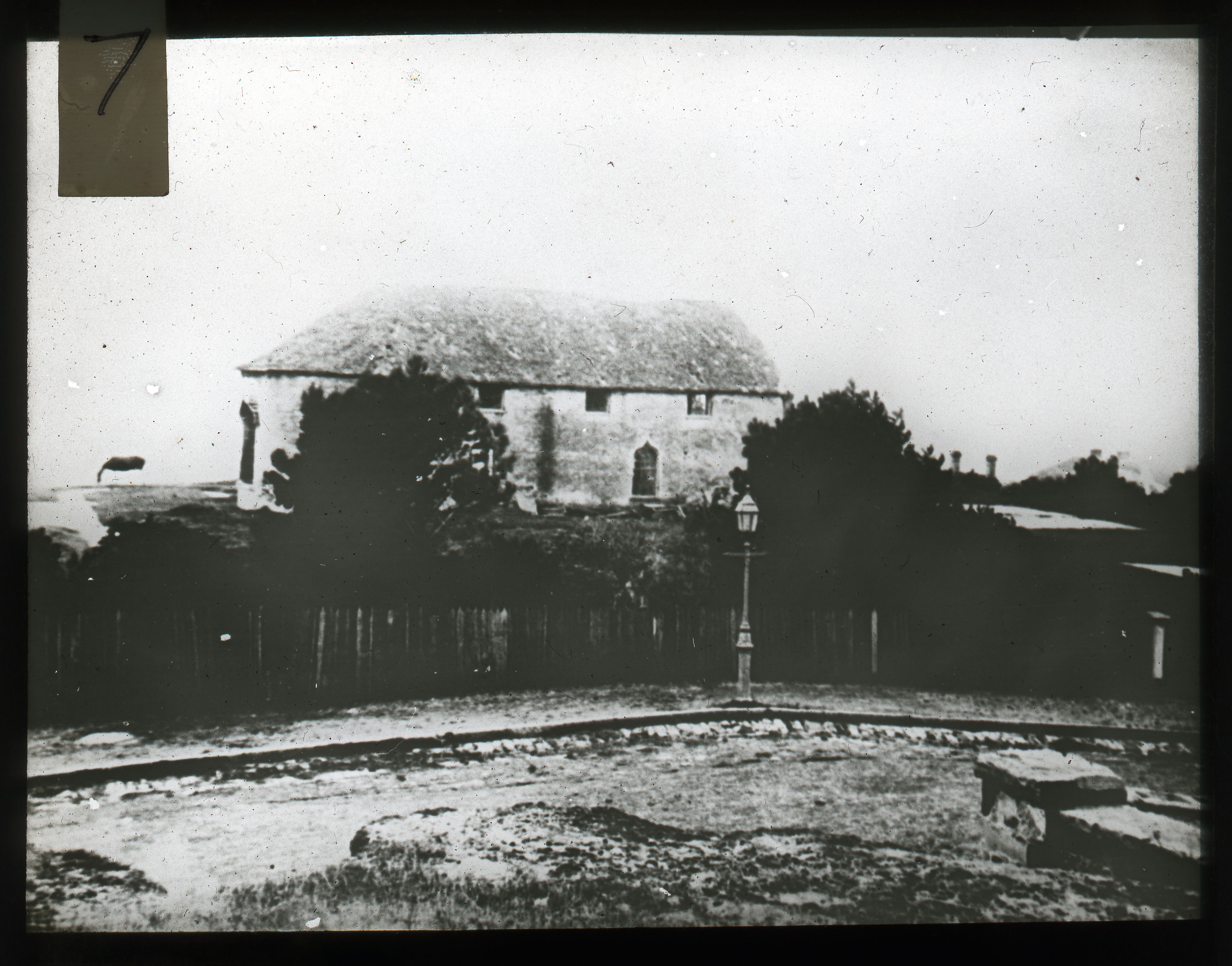
Early version of Christ Church with steeple removed

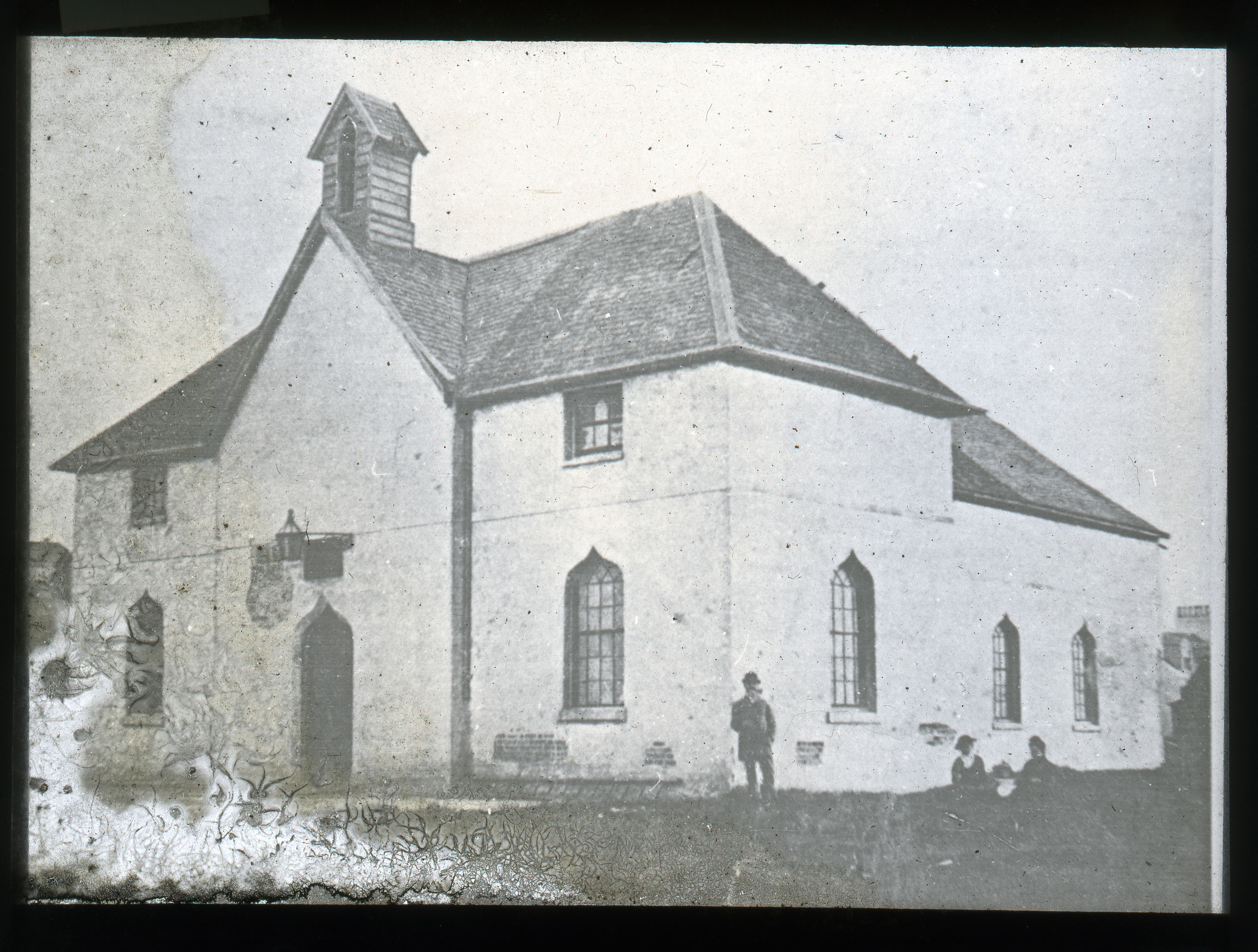
Christ Church with Tower removed and small Bellcote, [1868]

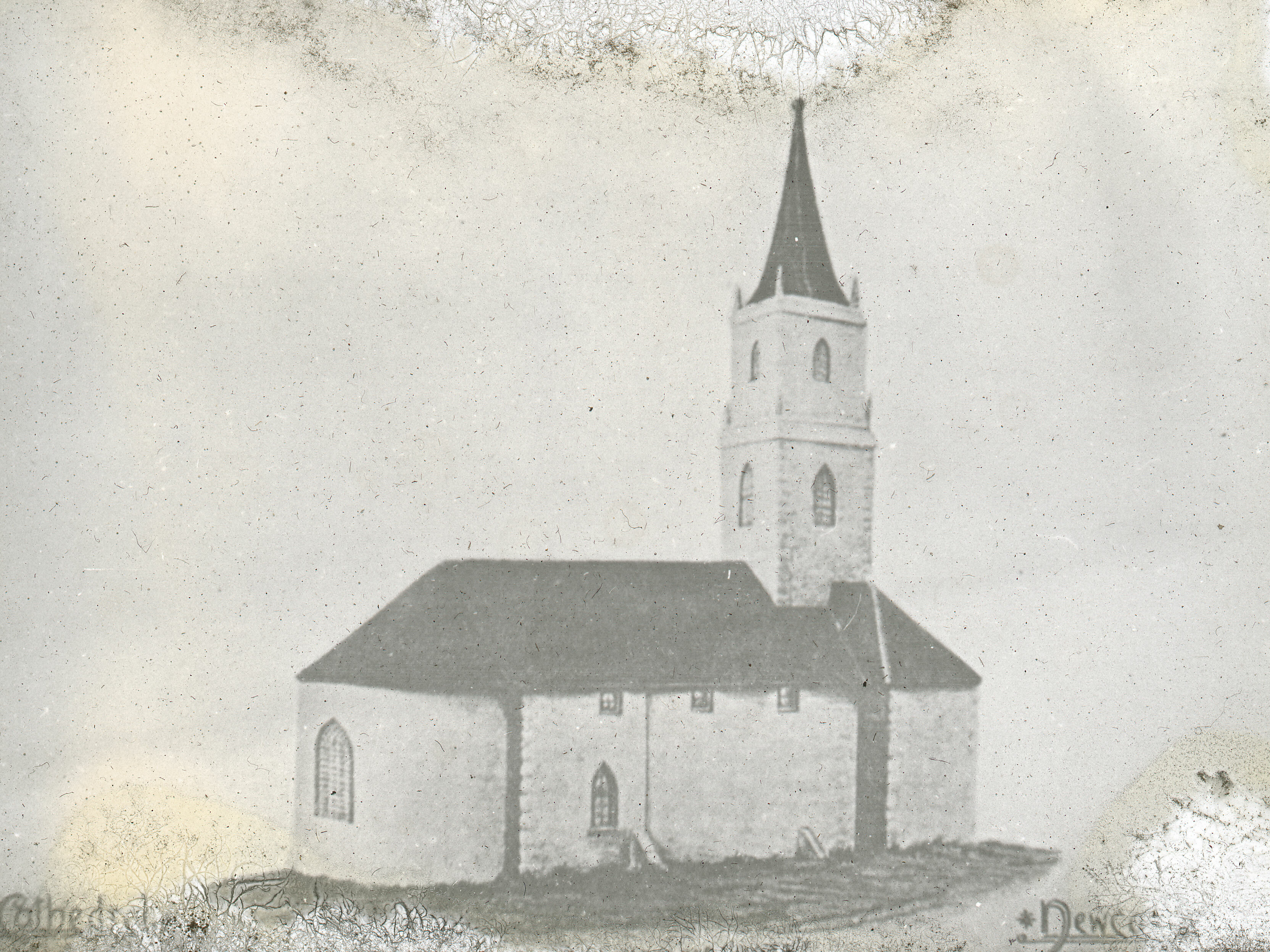
Original 1817 Christ Church with steeple

=== John Horbury Hunt as architect ===
During the second half of the 1850s, with coal production greatly increasing, there was a doubling of the population of Newcastle and it was decided that there was a need for a new or expanded cathedral. In the 1860s, Bishop Tyrrell argued that there was no need for a new building, and instead advocated an addition to the existing church. However, the diocese disagreed and in 1868 ran a competition for the design of a new cathedral. The requirements were that contestants design an establishment to be built of stone or brick, large enough for 1,000 people and at a maximum cost of ten thousand pounds. The winners were Terry and Speechly from Melbourne. John Horbury Hunt, who had become one of Australia's most significant ecclesiastical architects during the last third of the 19th century, had also entered the competition and was appointed supervising architect. After the cost of the winning design was found to have been seriously underestimated, Hunt's own plans were adopted.

Hunt was influenced by the Arts & Crafts movement with its emphasis on truth to natural materials, particularly brick and timber, and asymmetry of form. Hunt's other ecclesiastical projects included St Peter's Cathedral, Armidale (1871) and Christ Church Cathedral, Grafton (1880) as well as many parish churches in the Hunter Valley. Christ Church Cathedral was the largest and most ambitious building designed by Hunt. His design for the cathedral was for a cruciform Victorian Academic Gothic style building with a central tower over the crossing, supporting a spire.

Although Hunt had completed the designs for the cathedral in 1868, work was not started on it until 1883 and the building of the cathedral was marked by many delays and disputes. The original Christ Church remained in use until completion of the staged demolition in 1884.

During the comprehensive repairs undertaken after the 1989 earthquake the original 1817 foundation stone was repositioned within the cathedral in a location as close as possible to the original one.

While Christ Church Cathedral was being constructed, Selwyn commissioned Hunt to also design a pro-cathedral opposite Christ Church (now Horbury Hunt Hall). This was used until the opening of the new cathedral for services in 1902 and is still intact. It is listed on the State Heritage Inventory. In 1895, the relationship between Hunt, A. E. Selwyn, Dean of Newcastle, and the builder, John Straub, had become so bad that both Hunt and Straub were dismissed. By this stage, 27 years after Hunt had sketched the original design for the cathedral, it was far from complete. Even so, Hunt's attention to the construction of the foundations and ensuring that brick perpends were tight and mortar-filled preserved the cathedral's walling relatively unaffected nearly a century later when it suffered severe damage during the 1989 Newcastle earthquake. The full extent of Hunt's designs was not realised until 1979 with the addition of the tower, albeit without the spire Hunt had intended.

In 1900, John Francis Stretch replaced the late Selwyn as dean and he appointed John Hingestone Buckeridge as the cathedral architect. Buckeridge was responsible for overseeing the temporary roofing of the half-built nave. The cathedral was dedicated on 21 November 1902 during a service held in the presence of the Governor of New South Wales, Sir Harry Rawson, and the Premier of New South Wales, Sir John See.

There was great consternation in 1906-7 when severe mine "creep" in The Hill area of Newcastle damaged the foundations and brickwork of the western end of the newly occupied cathedral. For a time it was feared that this part of the building might have to be demolished. Repairs were required and the cost had to be met by parishioners.

The London firm of Charles Eamer Kempe planned and supplied the Gothic Revival stained glass windows in the nave and baptistry. The firm and its successor, Kempe & Co., were to do so for most of the cathedral's windows over the next three decades, the most celebrated being the western rose window installed in 1928. The cathedral would eventually contain more than 60 of the 72 Kempe & Co. windows in the whole of Australia. By contrast, in the whole of England the largest remaining collection of stained glass windows from the Kempe studio, in the Church of St Mary Magdalene, Hucknall, Nottinghamshire, has just 20 examples.

Included in Christ Church Cathedral's repository of stained glass was one further jewel: the Dies Domini ("Day of the Lord") window designed by Sir Edward Burne-Jones and executed by Morris & Co. of London, considered to represent Burne-Jones' powers at their peak and to constitute a national treasure, although not accorded such accolades at the time of its installation. The Dies Domini window, installed in 1907, is unique in Australia and is one of only two such windows of this design in the world, the other being installed in St Michael and St Mary Magdalene's Church, Easthampstead, Berkshire, England, in 1875.

=== Frederick George Castleden as architect ===
The next architect assigned to work on the project was Frederick George Castleden, prominent in Newcastle as the designer of many houses and commercial buildings in the region. Castleden's firm supervised the completion of the cathedral between 1909 and 1928. In 1911, the ambulatory around the east end of the church and the Tyrrell Chapel was built and in 1912 the eastern walls were completed and roofed and the east window finished with yet more stained glass from the firm of Kempe & Co.

The Warriors' Chapel followed in 1924. It was intended as a permanent memorial to all those who died in World War I, especially men and women of Newcastle and the Hunter Valley. As with other war memorials in Australia until the Vietnam War, the primary intention was to create a place where, in the absence of a grave, people could come to grieve and to give thanks for the sacrifices of those buried overseas who were never to return home. In designing the chapel the architects F. G. and A.C. Castleden drew on Buckeridge's earlier design for the east end of the cathedral. It was built by C. Davis & Sons.

==== Warriors' Chapel ====
The Warriors' Chapel's sandstone walls were embellished with carved inscriptions and the emblems of the armed services. Set into the walls were 13 stained glass windows executed by Kempe & Co., collectively telling the story of service and sacrifice by men and women in theatres of war and on the home front. In an era when masculinist definitions of war effort effectively marginalised the public recognition of women's contributions on the home front in Australia, the inclusion of St Martha, representing Home Service, was unusual. All forms of war service were, however, idealised in the standard Gothic Revival imagery found in ecclesiastical stained glass at the time. Realistic local and battle scenes in small, grey-coloured medallions inserted into several of the windows could not present an effective counterbalance to the much larger, idealised and brightly coloured depictions but are nevertheless important. On the whole, the stained glass windows in the Warriors' chapel were very much of their time in the manner chosen to depict war effort and in this they provide a striking contrast to the realism displayed in World War II memorials such as the cathedral's Zusters panels elsewhere described.

To commemorate the dead, a large number of movable and fixed items were commissioned, especially for the Warriors' Chapel. Of particular note was the extensive metalware commission of 11 items from William Mark, the most accomplished exponent of all the Australian metalsmiths working in the style of the Arts & Crafts movement, who, before returning to Australia from England in 1920, had received commissions from royalty and whose work had been purchased by British museums. The sheer size and quality of this collection has ensured it a place among the treasures of Australian churches. Among the most poignant items, now displayed in the cathedral's treasure case, were the illuminated Book of Remembrance (known as the Book of Gold) recording on a parish-by-parish basis the names of the fallen from the Diocese of Newcastle, and the chalice and paten. The covers of the Book of Gold and the chalice and paten were made from the melted down gold and gemstones of the rings and other jewellery given by the women of the diocese who had lost a family member or friend in the Great War.

A brass and wood processional Cross of Lorraine, the Mace Cross, was given to the cathedral and placed in the sanctuary of the Warriors' Chapel in memory of Lieutenant W. R. Mace, killed in action at Gallipoli on 29 September 1915. Other items in the chapel include a bronze sculpture of an unnamed recumbent soldier, known as the Forster Monument, given by a former governor-general, Lord Forster, and his wife as a memorial to one of their sons who was a friend of the artist, Cecil Thomas RA, while they were both in hospital being treated for their wounds. It is the only replica of the original bronze exhibited in the Royal Academy in London where it was praised as one of the very finest wartime sculptures. In a fitting location next to the Forster Monument is a wooden cross from the grave of an unknown soldier in France, which likewise represents all those who gave their lives in the Great War. The cross was entrusted by Toc H to the cathedral for safekeeping. A Toc H lamp, the Federal Lamp of Toc H Australia, from which all other lamps are lit, was another gift from Lord and Lady Forster in memory of two sons. A rushlight made by Australian members of the Toc H organisation in the Changi prisoner of war camp in Singapore during the Second World War is the only such rushlight to be returned to Australia and one of only three such rushlights to survive captivity. It has left Christ Church Cathedral only once, going to the Changi Chapel at the Royal Military College, Duntroon, on the occasion of the 75th anniversary of Toc H in Australia in 2000.

Probably it is because of Dean Horace Crotty's connection with Toc H, in his role of chaplain during World War I, that the cathedral became the parent church for Toc H in Australia and the place in which the movement has chosen to enshrine nationally significant items. Another Toc H item, on permanent loan to the cathedral from Toc H Newcastle, was the oak carpenter's bench installed as an altar in the St Christopher Chapel in 1930. This is an Australian-made Arts & Crafts style version of the altar used during World War I in Talbot House, Poperinghe, Belgium, where soldiers could avail themselves of precious rest during short periods away from the rigours of the front. Talbot House was established in 1915 by an Australian-born Army chaplain, the Revd P. B. "Tubby" Clayton. The name Toc H is derived from the signaller's code for Talbot House. It was the work of Talbot House which provided the inspiration for a movement which after the Great War was subsequently to spread to all countries of the former British Empire with its message of lifelong striving to put into practice a Christian way of life and to build a better world.

The memorial theme was continued in the reredos of the Toc H carpenter's bench. The reredos, comprising two panels of St Christopher painted by the English artist Daphne Allen, was given to the cathedral in memory of her cousin Colonel G. G. Short, who had been a synodsman and vestryman at the cathedral. The panels symbolised Colonel Short's devotion to Christ in carrying out his duty to his fellow countrymen and women during World War I, which he survived. The reredos was installed in 1934.

The only documented flag surviving from Australia's Gallipoli campaign, a Union Jack, together with its original pole, belonging to the 13th Australian Infantry Battalion, was brought back to Australia in 1916 for presentation to the cathedral by the battalion's commanding officer. It was restored in 2001 with funds raised by local war veterans and subsequently displayed on the western wall of the St Christopher Chapel.

A Victoria Cross awarded posthumously to Captain Clarence Jeffries at Passchendaele on 12 October 1917 was given to his family. On her death in 1954, Captain Jeffries' mother bequeathed his Victoria Cross in perpetuity to the deans and chapter of the cathedral. It is the only Victoria Cross in New South Wales not held in private ownership, and one of only two in the keeping of Australian churches (the other is held by St George's Cathedral, Perth). Nearby, at the eastern end of the Tyrrell Chapel, the Jeffries Chair originally placed in Holy Trinity Church, Abermain, by his aunt and uncle in 1919 was entrusted to the cathedral after the 1994 closure of the Abermain church.

After the installation of World War I memorials, cathedral building continued. In 1928 the Castleden firm completed further work on the arches of the church and the walls, closely based on Horbury Hunt's original designs even to the extent that clay from the same pit and the same moulds were used to make the bricks. However, there were some slight departures from Hunt's designs, these being the omission of the spire and the addition of a castellated parapet. There is also a visible change in the colour and quality of brickwork at the height of the clerestory window sills completed after Hunt's departure.

=== More recent developments ===
In 1969, the cathedral witnessed the Australian premiere of Benjamin Britten's Noye's Fludde ("Noah's Flood"). The "voice of God" was provided by Brin Newton-John, father of singer Olivia Newton-John.

In 1979 the transepts and the bell tower were raised by John Sara, of Castleden & Sara, returning to Hunt's original concept for the tower.

During the early 1980s the cathedral was further embellished with numerous works by Newcastle artists, including banners, a terracotta and wood crucifix, a tapestry of the Ten Virgins and a triptych depicting the legend of St Nicholas.

In 1982 the placing of a memorial in the cathedral comprising five panels painted by Reinis Zusters accorded long overdue recognition to the sacrifices of those Australians and their supporters at home who participated not only in World War II but also in the subsequent campaigns in Korea, Malaya and Vietnam which had not remained in the forefront of public consciousness in the same way as World Wars I and II.

The original Christ Church Cathedral organ, of which the pipework forms the basis of the present instrument, was built in 1906 by Norman & Beard (London and Norwich). It was rebuilt in 1963 by J.W. Walker & Sons (Middlesex), and most recently (1997–1998) underwent refurbishment and the addition of several ranks of pipes by Peter D. G. Jewkes Pty Ltd (Sydney).

After over 80 years of use, the cathedral was finally consecrated by Bishop Holland on 20 November 1983.

The 1989 Newcastle earthquake at first appeared to have damaged the cathedral only superficially. However, it was soon realised that the building had been significantly harmed, and in need of restoration and refurbishment works. This project was undertaken by Dean Graeme Lawrence and architect B. J. Collins of the firm EJE Architecture. Work was begun in 1995 and completed in 1997, involving an Australia-first engineering technique to strengthen the walls and piers by increasing ductility and therefore future earthquake resistance while at the same time maintaining aesthetic significance. The Cintec masonry anchoring system originally developed in Germany was used, in the process pioneering many building techniques in Australia. There are three basic elements in the Cintec system of reinforcement: a stainless steel anchor body to carry the load; cementitious grout; and the woven fabric sock which controls the movement of the grout. All the reinforcing was inserted into holes drilled in the brickwork without cooling water, as the escaping water could have damaged other areas of the cathedral. The total length of vertical and horizontal reinforcing installed was 3770 metres. The horizontal reinforcing of the nave walls, at 32 meters long, was a world record for this type of work. At the time the project involved the largest installation of Cintec anchors in a single building in the experience of the company.

In July 2019 Graeme Lawrence, who served as dean of the cathedral between 1984 and 2008, was convicted of raping a 15-year-old boy at the deanery in 1991. He was sentenced to eight years' imprisonment in September 2019. The Anglican Bishop of Newcastle apologised to the victim following Lawrence's conviction.

=== Cemetery ===
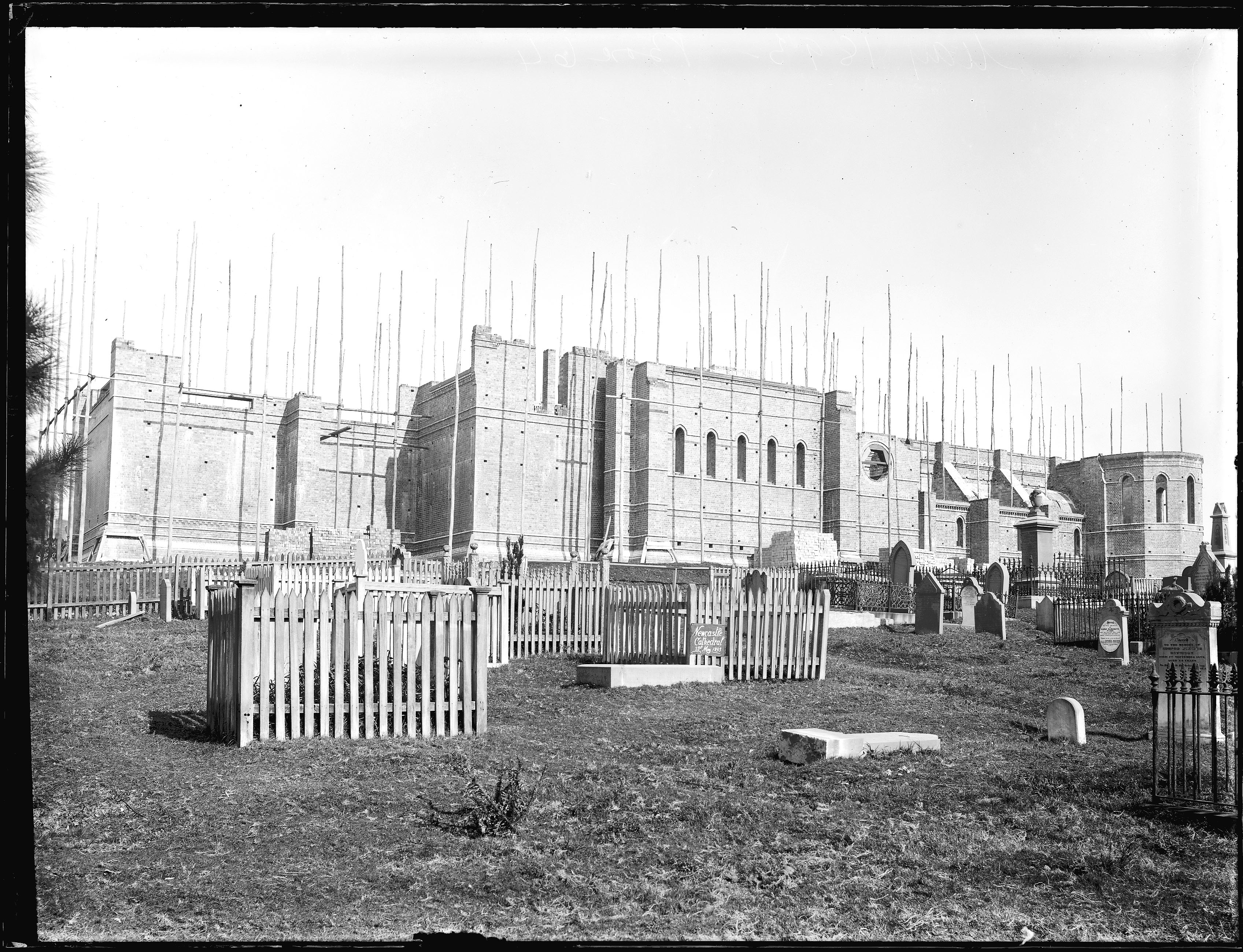
Construction of Christ Church Cathedral, Newcastle, NSW, 23 May 1893

The Christ Church burial ground, located on the northern side of the church and now a rest park, is the first known European burial ground in Newcastle and one of the first burial grounds established in Australia. The earliest recorded European burials at this site began with the construction of Christ Church in 1817. Although burials were under the authority of the Church of England, the burial site was initially used for people of all denominations. Following a Church of England act in 1836, Christ Church could no longer bury people of other denominations. As a result of this act, cemeteries were established for Roman Catholics and Presbyterians during the 1840s.

During the 19th century, new notions of hygiene led to the belief that there were significant health risks involved with having a cemetery in the heart of a city. This led to the relocation of cemeteries as well as gaols and isolation wards. In 1881 a new cemetery was opened at Sandgate, outside of central Newcastle, and Christ Church Cemetery was officially closed. There were several burials in the Christ Church burial site after the opening of the site at Sandgate resulting in legal action by the council. The last time a burial occurred at the Christ Church burial ground was in 1884. During the 20th century, however, the interment of ashes was made possible in cathedral grounds, first in the Columbarium built in 1955 and later in the memorial garden created on land abutting the Columbarium in 2006.

The area covered by the cemetery had originally been 1.2 hectares (3 acres) and unfenced, extending beyond King Street, but by 1884, it comprised just 0.40 hectares (1 acre). King Street formed its northern border, with a retaining wall between the street and the cemetery. With Christ Church no longer being used as a burial ground, the site was not well maintained. During the 1930s and 1940s there were attempts by the neighbouring landowners to use the area for other purposes. In the 1950s, debates about the burial ground intensified. The adjoining Newcastle Club wished to acquire it but had no success. The Newcastle City Council also wished to acquire the land and intended to develop it into a carpark.

Dismissing all these offers, Christ Church Cathedral arranged for the area to be re-fenced and to be cleared of weeds. The idea of making the area a rest park had been in existence since the 1870s and had been proposed again in 1951 by local historian William Goold. In 1966 the Christ Church Cathedral, Newcastle, Cemetery Act was passed, giving the majority of land to the council to be made into a public rest park. It also granted permission to remove headstones. Areas along the east, south and west boundaries of the ground were to remain the property of Christ Church Cathedral. In 1966, all legible tombstones were relocated to the eastern boundary of the park. The monument to James Hannell (the first Mayor of Newcastle) and his wife remained in its original location.

== Description ==
The cathedral is situated adjacent to Church Street on the southern, highest part of the site with the rest park (former cemetery) laid out on the slope to the north and bounded on its northern edge by King Street.

The completed cathedral represents a modified version of Horbury Hunt's original design, evolving over the course of several phases of construction lasting nearly a century with contributions from a number of architects and builders.

Parts of the 1817 foundation stone, incorporated into the later cathedral, remain legible, including the name of Governor Macquarie.

Remnant footings of the original Christ Church discovered during the earthquake repairs of 1995-1997 were recorded and left undisturbed when new flooring was installed.

=== Condition ===
The cathedral walls and piers were badly cracked by the 1989 earthquake. Only one stained glass window, that of the Madonna and Child in the Warriors' Chapel, sustained serious damage, but has been successfully restored. Restoration work of the walls and piers was begun in 1995 and completed in 1997.

The cathedral is in generally good condition. Its contents have been well maintained and expertly conserved where required. Since the earthquake repairs, however, the east wall of the cathedral around the stained glass windows has again been deteriorating both inside and out: mortar used to re-point the brick joints during the post-earthquake strengthening is falling out on the outside. On the inside the stone work is fretting badly and there are salt encrustations on the surface. Evidence of earlier repairs pre-dating those undertaken during restoration after the earthquake indicates that this is a recurring problem. Ongoing mortar deterioration can be linked to the use in the replacement mortars of Portland cement, which has a compound attacked by sulphate salts; the same compound is not found in the original lime mortars. In order to halt the deterioration process the mortar joints will require re-pointing with a mortar mix similar to that used originally.

Parts of the 1817 foundation stone remain legible, including the name of Governor Macquarie but, having been exposed to the elements for many years, much of the stone is showing signs of fretting and can thus be described as in only fair condition. An assessment of its conservation needs is currently being undertaken.

The cemetery and park are well maintained, although, because of weathering, some of the headstones are no longer legible.

=== Comparisons with other churches ===
The only other churches in New South Wales with links to Governor Macquarie are St John's Cathedral, Parramatta; St Matthew's Church, Windsor; St Luke's Church, Liverpool; and St James' Church, Sydney. Of these, only St John's Cathedral was built before Christ Church. The original St Phillip's Church, Sydney (occupied 1810) was demolished in 1856 and is no longer on its original site. While St James' Church remains intact, early depictions show that there have since been major encroachments on the surrounding land which obscure the original layouts.

The dimensions of Christ Church Cathedral exceed those of Sydney's St Andrew's Cathedral. In the whole of Australia, Christ Church Cathedral ranks third in size after St Paul's Cathedral, Melbourne, and St John's Cathedral, Brisbane, and is considerably larger than Horbury Hunt's other cathedrals in regional New South Wales at Armidale and Grafton.

Because Horbury Hunt's design was not fully realised, it is not as good an example of his cathedrals as the smaller ones at Armidale and Grafton in terms of demonstration of his skill in the use of bricks and his experimentation with unique and original features. The Armidale cathedral, particularly, is "an orchestration in a full range of moulded brickwork" of sheer virtuosity and daring placement. By contrast Christ Church Cathedral is one of Hunt's most restrained endeavours in ecclesiastical architecture. It does, however, demonstrate Hunt's penchant for radical departure from convention in the placement of the baptistry directly opposite the cathedral's main entrance. Perhaps, too, the quality of Hunt's work on the design and early phase of the building of Christ Church Cathedral is worthy of more respect in making comparisons with his other cathedrals at Armidale and Grafton. In the opinion of Reynolds, Muir and Hughes, it was largely because of Hunt's work that Newcastle Cathedral's walling survived earthquake damage relatively unaffected.

Kempe windows in Australia are rare, with other examples existing in New South Wales at St Matthew's Church, Albury, and St James' Church, Morpeth. St Peter's Cathedral, Adelaide, has a rose window and All Saints' Church, Ainslie, in the Australian Capital Territory has a window obtained from a disused church in England. Christ Church Cathedral has by far the largest collection in Australia with more than 60 Kempe windows out of a national total of 72. In comparison, in England the largest collection of Kempe windows in one location numbers just 20 examples of his work, and is found in the Church of St Mary Magdalene, Hucknall, Nottingham. Christ Church Cathedral's great western rose has been described as one of the glories of Australia's heritage in stained glass and is celebrated for its brilliant colours.

The cathedral's Burne-Jones Dies Domini window is unique in Australia and is regarded as an example of his powers at their peak. The only other one of this design was executed in 1875 for the church of St Michael and St Mary Magdalene in Easthampstead, Berkshire, England, but is not identical in its glass, colouring and detail.

The cathedral's extensive collection of the war memorabilia which make it such a compelling focus for memorial by individuals and groups contains many items of unique aesthetic and historical value not duplicated elsewhere. The Warriors' Chapel and the works created for it, especially the items commissioned from William Mark, have been singled out as perhaps the most outstanding public war memorial in Australia. While works by William Mark held by other Australian churches have featured alongside several of the cathedral's Mark items in a 1985 exhibition of Australia's ecclesiastical metalwork treasures held in the National Gallery of Victoria, the number of items in Christ Church Cathedral's Mark collection and the purpose for which they were created make it unique.

Terra cotta panels by George Tinworth are to be found in three other places in Australia (Old Parliament House, the Sydney Powerhouse Museum and the Queensland Art Gallery), but the cathedral's complete Tinworth reredos in the Warriors' Chapel is the only one in Australia and one of very few to remain complete or undamaged in England after World War II. The best known of these is that of York Minster.

The cathedral's Victoria Cross is unique in New South Wales as no others are held there outside private ownership. Only one other Victoria Cross is held by an Australian church, at St George's Cathedral, Perth. The great majority of Victoria Crosses, 65 out of the 97 awarded, are held in the Australian War Memorial in Canberra.

The only flag flown by Australian soldiers throughout the Gallipoli campaign with a documented provenance is the one displayed in Christ Church Cathedral. There is one other flag, in St John's Cathedral, Brisbane, thought to have been carried ashore by soldiers from Queensland during the dawn landings at Anzac Cove, but proof is lacking.

In Sydney convict and free settlers of all denominations were originally served by the Old Sydney Burial Ground. However this was closed as early as 1820 and the records of the time over which it was used are extremely incomplete. The site subsequently became the place chosen for St Andrew's Cathedral and the Sydney Town Hall, and a portion was taken for the realignment of George Street (Old Sydney Burial Ground). As a result of these changes in land use the site is no longer easily accessible. In comparative terms Newcastle's inner-city Christ Church burial ground possesses rare value for purposes of archaeological study.

Since the Cintec system was used to repair the cathedral following earthquake damage, it has been used elsewhere in Australia. However, none of the repair projects has approached that of Christ Church Cathedral in terms of size and the risk entailed in pioneering the technique.

== Heritage listing ==
Christ Church Cathedral with its moveable collection, park and cemetery is historically significant because of its origins in early convict history and the establishment of the Anglican Church in New South Wales.

The cathedral is associated with a number of prominent architects, clergy and government officials during the 19th century. John Horbury Hunt's 1868 plans exemplify Arts & Crafts principles - using bricks rather than stone for structural and decorative purposes. It is the largest of the cathedrals designed by Horbury Hunt, the largest Anglican cathedral in New South Wales, the largest provincial Anglican cathedral in Australia and in a dramatic setting. Its collection of stained glass is considered outstanding in both state and nation for its size and quality.

Technically, the German-developed Cintec system of strengthening masonry by insertion of a combination of an anchor of stainless steel rods and controlled grouting was pioneered in Australia in repairs to the cathedral after the 1989 earthquake.

The cathedral's moveable collection contains many unique or rare items memorialising those who served in war, especially World War I. It includes fittings and ecclesiastical items of exceptional quality as well as the state's only Victoria Cross not in private ownership and the nation's only surviving Union Jack flown by Australian soldiers throughout the Gallipoli campaign. The cathedral is a place of pilgrimage for veterans, their families, friends and descendants, from all around Australia.

The rest park was one of the earliest European burial grounds established in New South Wales, pre-dating Christ Church. It is the site of convict burials and provides significant evidence of changing burial customs during the nineteenth century. Sections of footings from the original Christ Church beneath the cathedral's floor, were recorded and left undisturbed during the restoration works of 1995–97, to facilitate further investigation.

The cathedral grounds and former cemetery have retained the same basic size and shape set out in Henry Dangar's original 1823 town plan, providing evidence of early town planning.

Christ Church Cathedral was listed on the New South Wales State Heritage Register on 28 June 2011 having satisfied the following criteria.

The place is important in demonstrating the course, or pattern, of cultural or natural history in New South Wales.

The cathedral meets this criterion for State significance because of its associations with early convict history. Specifically as it occupies the site of the third brick and stone Anglican church to be built in the colony Christ Church Cathedral underlines the tentative expansion of the colony away from Sydney and the importance placed on religion and its practice by the early government of New South Wales.

The rest park meets this criterion because it is one of the oldest European burial grounds in Australia and pre-dates the first church on the site. The park and cemetery are historically significant because they date back to the earliest stages of official burial when cemeteries controlled by the Church of England accepted people of any denomination. Thus, its history extends over the range of denominational cemetery management and it is one of the few burial grounds to articulate this history.

The place has a strong or special association with a person, or group of persons, of importance of cultural or natural history of New South Wales's history.

The cathedral meets this criterion of state significance because of its association with one of Australia's most influential ecclesiastical architects, John Horbury Hunt. While the style is more restrained than Hunt's other cathedrals in Grafton and Armidale, it is his most ambitious undertaking in ecclesiastical architecture.

The cathedral is significant for its association with the life of William Tyrrell, the first bishop of the Anglican Diocese of Newcastle, who was consecrated in London on 29 June 1847. He was only the second bishop in the state of New South Wales after Bishop Broughton of Sydney and with his appointment Newcastle officially became a city. His see extended far beyond the present boundaries of the Diocese of Newcastle./

The site of Christ Church Cathedral is significant for its association with Governor Lachlan Macquarie. /The building of Christ Church on the site of the present Cathedral in 1817-18 was accorded priority in the realisation of his plans for the settlement.

The place is important in demonstrating aesthetic characteristics and/or a high degree of creative or technical achievement in New South Wales.:

The cathedral meets this criterion of state significance because it is the largest Anglican cathedral in New South Wales and the largest of the three designed by John Horbury Hunt. It has landmark qualities, having dominated and defined the Newcastle skyline for many years. The form, scale, colour, texture and materials of the fabric combine to present a piece of extraordinary architecture in a most dramatic setting.

Horbury Hunt's work is also of importance in establishing the state-significant aesthetic qualities of the cathedral at an intimate level. His care in overseeing and maintaining the quality of brickwork is inseparable from its high aesthetic value. Along with the work of subsequent architects, Hunt's work and its links to the Arts & Crafts movement have contributed to making the building one of Australia's most significant aesthetically.

The cathedral meets this criterion of state significance because it is embellished with a collection of stained glass windows by Kempe and Kempe & Co, wherein the collection is by far the largest in Australia. It also contains the only Dies Domini (Day of the Lord) window in Australia designed by Edward Burne-Jones and executed by Morris & Co., which has been described as representing Burne-Jones' work at the height of his powers.

The cathedral meets this criterion of state significance because of the pioneering techniques used during repairs to earthquake-damaged walls and piers. These techniques employed a combination of very long stainless steel rods and controlled grouting inserted into holes drilled into the brickwork. The aim was to strengthen the Cathedral walls and piers by increasing ductility and therefore ability to withstand future earthquakes while maintaining the aesthetic quality of the building. At the time these techniques had not been used before in Australia. The Cintec masonry anchoring and reinforcement system originally developed in Germany has three basic elements: a stainless steel anchor body to carry the load; cementitious grout; and the woven fabric sock which controls the movement of the grout. All the reinforcing was inserted into holes drilled in the brickwork without cooling water, as the escaping water could have damaged other areas of the cathedral. The total length of vertical and horizontal reinforcing installed was 3770 metres. The horizontal reinforcing of the nave walls, at 32 meters long, was a world record for this type of work. At the time the project involved the largest installation of Cintec anchors in a single building in the experience of the company.

The place has strong or special association with a particular community or cultural group in New South Wales for social, cultural or spiritual reasons.

The cathedral meets this criterion of state significance because it is a physical manifestation of the Anglican Diocese of Newcastle. It has been, and continues to be, a focus for the lives of Anglicans in Newcastle and the surrounding area as well as for other residents. It is the place to which people have come on important occasions such as the Queen Elizabeth II Coronation Service and the Earthquake Memorial Service, the latter attended by national and state dignitaries including the Governor General, the Prime Minister of Australia, the state governor and the state premier.

The cathedral also meets this criterion of State significance because it is a place of pilgrimage for war veterans, their families and descendants, who visit the cathedral from many places in Australia to see items of great historic and aesthetic value memorialising those who died in twentieth century conflicts, especially World Wars I and II, and those who supported them. Among the organisations which have actively supported and promoted the acquisition and conservation of war memorials in the cathedral are the Returned and Services League of Australia, the Vietnam Veterans' Association, the Combined Ex-Service Groups of the Australian Army, Navy and Air Force and the War Widows' Guild.

Of especial note for its beauty and associated items are the Warriors' Chapel and the collection of 11 works commissioned for it from the renowned Australian metalsmith William Mark, considered to be outstanding for their scope and quality. After World War I the people of the Diocese demonstrated their love and gratitude for the fallen by donating money and materials to create this memorial and its associated items. Particularly meaningful in terms of the Diocesan community's loss was the sacrifice of gold rings and other jewellery by the families and friends of those who died to provide the materials for making the covers of the William Mark Book of Remembrance (Book of Gold) and the chalice and paten.

The cathedral meets this criterion of State significance because it is the place chosen for the safekeeping of the Victoria Cross awarded to Captain Clarence Jeffries in 1917, along with the Union Jack flown at the headquarters of the 13th Battalion throughout the Gallipoli campaign in 1915. The Jeffries Victoria Cross is the only one in the state kept outside private ownership, and therefore available for public viewing, while the Gallipoli flag is the only documented such flag to exist in the nation and is therefore of great significance in the context of a resurgence of interest in the Gallipoli campaign and in World War I generally by increasing numbers of Australians.

The cathedral also has State significance as the national church for the Toc H movement in Australia, and the place where many items associated with Toc H in both World Wars are now permanently enshrined.

The memorials to soldiers as well as clergy and parishioners, many of whom took part in the war effort, increase the intensity of the social value of the building and its contents in meeting this criterion of State significance.

The place has potential to yield information that will contribute to an understanding of the cultural or natural history of New South Wales.

It meets this criterion of State significance because the footings of the original Christ Church discovered during earthquake repairs of 1995-1997 have been mapped and left undisturbed to allow for any future archaeological study of early colonial architecture and building techniques during the convict era. There is also excellent archaeological potential in the park and cemetery for evidence of early burials.

The place possesses uncommon, rare or endangered aspects of the cultural or natural history of New South Wales.

It meets this criterion of State significance because it is a rare example of inner-city colonial town planning in which the original shape and size of land designated for a church and attached burial ground have not been altered substantially by changes in land use and ownership. As the centrepiece to Henry Dangar's plan of 1823, the site allows significant interpretation of the early planning of Newcastle.

== Deans of Newcastle ==
The following individuals have served as Deans of Newcastle:

Ordinal	Name	Term start	Term end	Notes
1	Arthur Selwyn	1892	1899	
2	John Stretch	1900	1909	afterwards Bishop of Newcastle, 1906
3	Cyril Golding-Bird	1909	1914	afterwards Bishop of Kalgoorlie, 1914
4	Henry Kingsley Archdall	1915	1919	afterwards Principal of St David's College, 1938
5	Horace Crotty	1919	1928	afterwards Bishop of Bathurst, 1928
6	William Johnson	1928	1936	afterwards Bishop of Ballarat, 1936
7	Thomas Makinson Armour	1936	1943	afterwards Bishop of Wangaratta, 1943
8	Arthur Morris	1943	1948	
9	Norman Blow	1949	1950	
10	William Hardie	1950	1961	afterwards Bishop of Ballarat, 1961
11	John Falkingham	1961	1975	
12	Robert Beal	1975	1983	afterwards Bishop of Wangaratta, 1985
13	Graeme R. Lawrence	1984	2008	a convicted child molester
14	James Rigney	2009	2013	
15	Stephen Williams	23 June 2013	2017	
16	Katherine Bowyer	4 October 2017	2026	Previously rector of Cardiff, first woman Dean of Newcastle. Afterwards rector of Christchurch St Lucia, Qld

== See also ==
- St John's Anglican Church, Newcastle
- List of Anglican cathedrals in Australia
