= Ken Mason (bishop) =

Australian Anglican bishop (1928–2018)

The Right Reverend Ken Mason
- Bishop
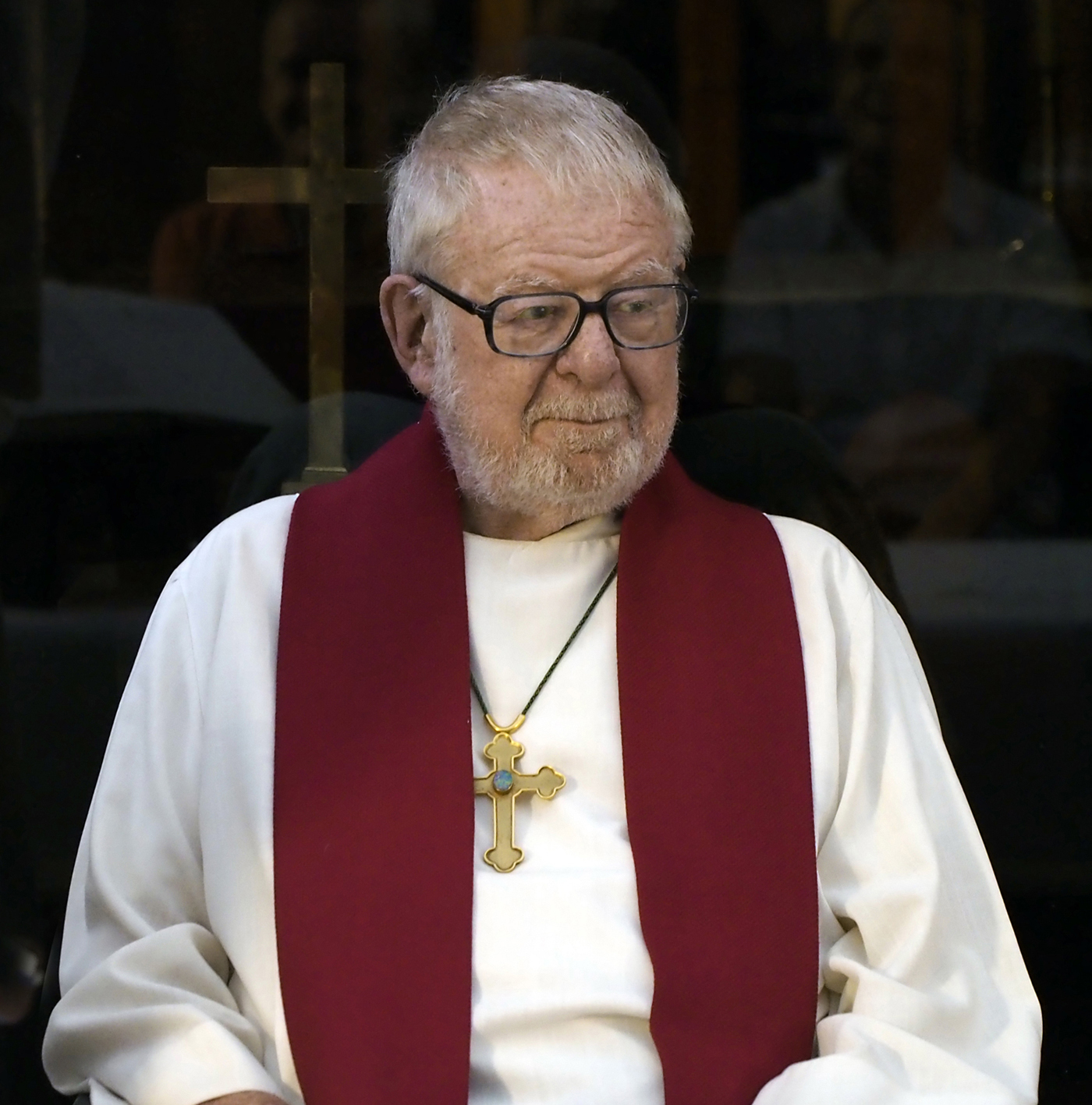
- Church: Anglican Church of Australia

Orders
- Consecration: 1968 by Philip Strong

Personal details
- Born: 4 September 1928 Ashfield, Sydney, Australia
- Died: 20 December 2018 (aged 90) Sydney, Australia
- Buried: St James' Church, Sydney
- Denomination: Anglican

Kenneth Bruce Mason AM (4 September 1928 – 20 December 2018) was an Anglican bishop in Australia.

Mason was educated at the University of Queensland and ordained in 1953. His first position was as a curate at Gilgandra. He then held incumbencies at Darwin and Alice Springs. From 1965 to 1968 he was Dean of Trinity College, Melbourne. As a professed member of the Brotherhood of the Good Shepherd, Mason was known as "Brother Aiden" until his consecration as a bishop. On 24 February 1968, at St John's Cathedral (Brisbane), he was consecrated to the episcopate to serve as the Bishop of the Northern Territory, a position he held until 1983. From 1983 to 1993 Mason was chairman of the Australian Board of Missions (now called the Anglican Board of Mission - Australia).

In retirement, Mason regularly attended St James' Church, Sydney, where a Requiem Eucharist was held for him on 19 January 2019.

Religious titles
Preceded by Inaugural appointment	Bishop of the Northern Territory; 1968–1983	Succeeded by Clyde Maurice Wood
