= Robert Dann =

Robert William Dann (28 September 1914 – 10 April 2008), also often known informally as "Bob Dann", was an Australian Anglican bishop. He was the 9th Anglican Archbishop of Melbourne.

== Biography ==
Dann studied for ordination at Trinity College at the University of Melbourne and was ordained in 1946. His first post was as Director of Youth and Religious Education in the Anglican Diocese of Melbourne. After successive incumbencies he was appointed the Archdeacon of Essendon and, in 1969, he became a bishop coadjutor of the diocese before becoming the archbishop eight years later. He retired in 1983. He came out of retirement for some months in 1987 to take charge of the parish of St John's, Camberwell, after the sudden death on the vicar, until a new appointment could be made.

He died on 10 April 2008, aged 93.

== Notes ==
Religious titles
Preceded by Frank Woods	Archbishop of Melbourne; 1977 –1983	Succeeded by David Penman
