= Greg Thompson (bishop) =

Australian Anglican bishop

The Right Reverend Greg Thompson
- Bishop of Newcastle
- Province: Province of New South Wales
- Diocese: Diocese of Newcastle
- In office: 2013 to 2017
- Predecessor: Brian Farran
- Successor: Peter Stuart
- Other post: Bishop of the Northern Territory (2007–2013)

Orders
- Ordination: 1986
- Consecration: 31 May 2007

Personal details
- Born: Gregory Edwin Thompson; 1956 (age 69–70) Muswellbrook, New South Wales, Australia
- Denomination: Anglicanism

Gregory Edwin Thompson (born 1956) is a retired Australian Anglican bishop. From 2014 to 2017 he was the Bishop of Newcastle. He was previously, from 2007 to 2013, the Bishop of the Northern Territory.

== Early life and education ==
Thompson was born in Muswellbrook, New South Wales, Australia. He studied at the University of Newcastle. He trained for ordained ministry at Ridley College, an Evangelical Anglican theological college in Melbourne.

== Ordained ministry ==
Thompson was ordained in 1986. From 1988 to 1994, he was Parish Priest of Darwin in the Northern Territory. Then, from 1994 to 1999, he was the New South Wales State Secretary of the Bush Church Aid Society. Having returned to parish ministry, he was Rector of St John's Church, Darlinghurst in Sydney between 1999 and 2004, and then Rector of St John's Church in Canberra.

Thompson was ordained to the episcopate on 31 May 2007 at Christ Church Cathedral, Darwin. He then became the Bishop of the Northern Territory. In September 2012, he was elected as the next Bishop of Newcastle. He took up the appointment on 2 February 2013, becoming the 13th Bishop of Newcastle. Thompson concluded his ministry on 31 May 2017. His farewell service was held in Christ Church Cathedral Newcastle on 21 May 2017.

== Personal life ==
Thompson is married to Kerry.

In 2015, Thompson reported that he had been sexually abused by Ian Shevill as a young man when he was 19 and interested in the priesthood. Shevill has been identified as a sexual predator by the Royal Commission into Institutional Responses to Child Sexual Abuse in 2016.

== See also ==
- Brian Farran
- List of Bishops of Newcastle

Anglican Communion titles
Preceded by Philip Freier	Bishop of the Northern Territory; 2007–2014	Succeeded by Greg Anderson
Preceded by Brian Farran	Bishop of Newcastle; 2014–2017	Succeeded by Peter Stuart
