= St Columb's Hall, Wangaratta =

Coordinates: 36°21′30″S 146°18′45″E

St Columb's Hall, Wangaratta was a theological college which opened in 1903 to train clergy to serve the Anglican Church in Australia. It closed in 1969.

Opened by Thomas Henry Armstrong, the first Bishop of Wangaratta, St Columb's Hall functioned as a Bishop’s College. Some 106 students graduated from the Hall, ordained not only for the benefit of the Diocese of Wangaratta but also for the dioceses of Ballarat, Bendigo, Melbourne, Polynesia, Riverina and the former Diocese of Carpentaria. The closure in 1969 was brought about by the move towards more university based undergraduate education for young clergy.
