= Brian Farran =

Australian retired Anglican bishop

The Right Reverend Brian Farran
- Bishop of Newcastle
- Church: Anglican Church of Australia
- Diocese: Diocese of Newcastle
- Installed: 2005
- Term ended: 15 December 2012
- Predecessor: Roger Herft
- Successor: Greg Thompson

Orders
- Ordination: 1968
- Consecration: 2005

Personal details
- Born: Brian George Farran; 15 December 1944
- Spouse: Robin Farran
- Education: Australian National University

Brian George Farran (born 15 December 1944) is an Australian retired Anglican bishop. He was the Bishop of Newcastle in New South Wales.

Farran was educated at the Australian National University and St John's College, Morpeth. Ordained in 1968 his first positions were curacies at St Philip's O’Connor and St Alban's Griffith. He was then incumbent at the Church of the Epiphany, Lake Cargelligo, St Barnabas' North Rockhampton and St Saviour's Gladstone. In 1983 he became Dean of St Paul's Cathedral, Rockhampton, and then an assistant bishop in the Diocese of Perth, serving first the Goldfields Region then the Northern Region. In 2005 he became the diocesan bishop of Newcastle. He retired on 15 December 2012. He is married to Robin Farran.

== Related pages ==
- Greg Thompson

Anglican Communion titles
Preceded by Roger Herft	Bishop of Newcastle (Australia); 2005–2012	Succeeded by Greg Thompson
