= Clarence Bester =

Australian Anglican Bishop

The Right Reverend Clarence Bester
- Bishop of Wangaratta
- Church: Anglican Church of Australia
- Diocese: Wangaratta
- Installed: 23 February 2020
- Predecessor: John Parkes
- Other posts: Diocesan archdeacon, Anglican Diocese of Wangaratta (2016–2020); Archdeacon to the Ordinary, Anglican Diocese of False Bay (2010–2014); Archdeacon of Helderberg, Anglican Diocese of False Bay (2006–2010)

Orders
- Ordination: 1996 (as deacon)
- Consecration: 22 February 2020 by Philip Freier

Personal details
- Born: 1970 or 1971 (age 55–56)
- Denomination: Anglican
- Spouse: Michelle
- Children: 2

Clarence Edgar Bester (born 1970/1971) is a South African-born Australian bishop in the Anglican Church of Australia. He has served as the 11th Bishop of Wangaratta since February 2020.

== Early life and parish ministry ==
Bester was born, raised and educated in Cape Town, South Africa. He wanted to be a priest from age 13 or 14, but after his education took a job at the National Library of South Africa as a library assistant. He was offered a full scholarship to study library science but declined it to take up the opportunity to enter ministry.

In 1996, Bester was ordained as deacon in the Anglican Diocese of Cape Town in the Anglican Church of Southern Africa. He then served in various parishes in the Diocese of False Bay where he was ordained as priest and later collated as archdeacon. He served as rector of Strand for 12 years as well as Archdeacon of Helderberg from 2006 to 2010 and Archdeacon to the Ordinary from 2010 to 2014. During 2007 and 2013, Bester served as a locum priest in the Diocese in Europe at the Chaplaincy of Bonn and Cologne and Chaplaincy of Strasbourg respectively. Bester still holds permission to officiate in that diocese.

In 2014, Bester decided to move overseas with his family and, when he was not able to pursue further options in the United Kingdom or Europe, he pursued three options in Australia in Bunbury, Perth and Shepparton. He chose the latter because he received a response from the Archdeacon of Wangaratta within an hour and because it gave him an opportunity to work with a fellow South African. Bester was eventually appointed as assistant priest in the Shepparton parish, where he served for 20 months, during which time he was asked to do a ministry development plan for the parish and was included on the diocese's strategic planning operational team. He found the smaller size of congregations in Wangaratta a challenge compared to ministry in South Africa.

On 26 November 2016, Bester was appointed as priest of the Parish of Wangaratta West and the Warbys. On the same day, he was collated as Archdeacon for Ministry Development within the diocese by Bishop John Parkes. The role was designed to strengthen the capacity of the diocese and offer new opportunities. After a further 14 months, he was appointed as full-time diocesan archdeacon and bishop's commissary and, on 1 November 2018, as vicar-general of the diocese. He administered the diocese following the retirement of Bishop Parkes.

Bester's time at Wangaratta has been characterised by his involvement in ministry development, clergy development and recruitment and clergy and lay training as well as exploring new models of ministry for the diocese.

== Episcopal ministry ==
On 21 December 2019, Bester was elected as the 11th Bishop of Wangaratta, replacing John Parkes who had recently retired. Before his appointment he was required to manage the diocese's response to the 2019–20 Australian bushfire season which affected the diocese. Bester was consecrated as a bishop at St Paul's Cathedral, Melbourne, on 22 February 2020 by the Archbishop of Melbourne and then-Anglican Primate of Australia, Philip Freier. He was enthroned at Holy Trinity Cathedral, Wangaratta, on 23 February 2020. Bester stated at the time of his appointment that he was "deeply humbled" to take on the role of bishop, saw his role as to make a difference to people's lives but saw it as a "team effort" for all within the diocese.

== Advocacy ==
Bester is a supporter of LGBTQI inclusion and allowing the blessing of same-sex unions in the Anglican Church of Australia. In 2018, he moved a motion in the Wangaratta diocese to explore the blessing of same-sex marriages. A planned blessing of the civil same-sex marriage of two priests in the diocese resulting from that motion was called off in September 2019 after the motion was referred to the Anglican Church of Australia's appellate tribunal on its legality. In October 2019, Bester criticised the Archbishop of Sydney, Glenn Davies, for a speech asking bishops who disagreed with the church's doctrine on same-sex marriage to leave the Anglican Church.

== Personal life ==
Bester became an Australian citizen on Australia Day 2020.

Bester met his wife Michelle, a recruitment consultant, during his first ministry posting in South Africa. They have been married since 2000 and have two sons.

Anglican Communion titles
| Preceded by John Parkes | Bishop of Wangaratta; 2020–present | Succeeded by incumbent |
