= Greg Anderson (bishop) =

Australian Anglican bishop (born 1961)

The Right Reverend Greg Anderson
- Bishop of the Northern Territory
- Province: Province of Queensland
- Diocese: Diocese of the Northern Territory
- In office: 29 November 2014
- Predecessor: Greg Thompson

Orders
- Ordination: 2001 (deacon); 2002 (priest) by Philip Freier
- Consecration: 29 November 2014 by Phillip Aspinall

Personal details
- Born: Gregory David Anderson; 1961 (age 64–65) Sydney, New South Wales, Australia
- Denomination: Anglicanism
- Spouse: Annette
- Children: 4
- Education: University of Sydney (BA, PhD); Moore Theological College (BTh, Dip. Min)

Gregory David Anderson (born 1961) is an Australian Anglican bishop and former musicologist who has served as the 6th Bishop of the Northern Territory since 29 November 2014.

== Early life and parish ministry ==
Anderson was born in Sydney and attended an Anglican church from birth.

In the early-mid 1980s Anderson studied ethnomusicology at the University of Sydney with an interest in researching traditional Aboriginal songs. In 1986, he moved to the Northern Territory for 14 months to research the songs of Central Arnhem Land, during which time he was adopted by a Rembarrnga clan and he worked with musicians who had become Christians through a revival on Elcho Island in 1979. This led Anderson to study theology in order to be involved in the growth and development of the Aboriginal church.

After completing studies at Moore Theological College, Anderson returned to the Northern Territory with his wife and children as a missionary with the Church Missionary Society where he remained for the next 12 years. He lived at Numbulwar and later in Darwin, training Aboriginal and Torres Strait Islander church leaders first at Nungalinya College (where he served as Academic Dean) and for the Diocese of the Northern Territory (where he served as Aboriginal Ministry Development Officer and an Honorary Assistant Priest at Christ Church Cathedral, Darwin. Anderson was ordained deacon in 2001 and priest in 2002, and was the first person to be ordained by Bishop Philip Freier (in his role at the time as Bishop of the Northern Territory).

In 2007, Anderson and his family moved back to Sydney where he served head of the Department of Mission at Moore Theological College, a position he held until his appointment to the episcopate in 2014.

== Episcopal ministry ==
In June 2014, Anderson was elected as the sixth Bishop of the Northern Territory, replacing Bishop Greg Thompson who had been translated to the Anglican Diocese of Newcastle as of 2014. He was consecrated and enthroned as bishop on the eve of St Andrew's Day, on 29 November 2014.

== Personal life ==
Anderson is married to Annette Eriksson, who is herself a music educator and musician and previously conducted the Darwin Youth Orchestra. They have four children.

Anglican Communion titles
Preceded by Greg Thompson	Bishop of the Northern Territory; 2014–present	Incumbent
