= Philip Freier =

Australian Anglican bishop

The Most Reverend Philip Freier
- Primate of Australia; Archbishop of Melbourne
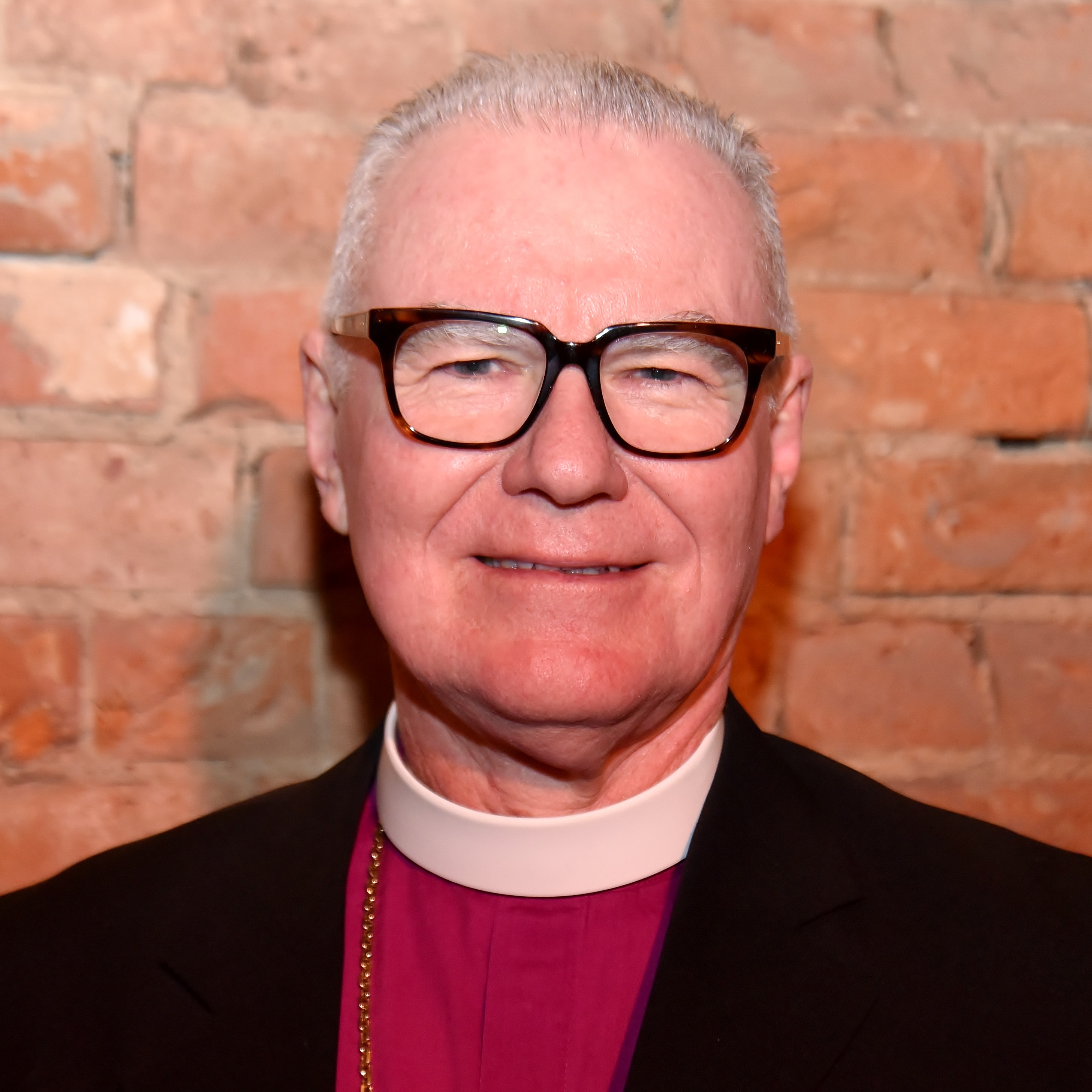
- Freier in 2019
- Church: Anglican Church of Australia
- Province: Victoria
- Diocese: Melbourne
- In office: 2014–2020 (as primate); 2006–2025 (as archbishop)
- Predecessor: Phillip Aspinall (as primate); Peter Watson (as archbishop)
- Successor: Geoffrey Smith (as primate)
- Previous post: Bishop of the Northern Territory (1999–2006)

Orders
- Ordination: 1982
- Consecration: 1999 (bishop)
- Rank: 2006 (archbishop)

Personal details
- Born: Philip Leslie Freier; 9 February 1955 (age 71) Brisbane, Queensland, Australia
- Denomination: Anglicanism
- Spouse: Joy née Launder
- Education: Queensland Institute of Technology; University of Queensland; Melbourne College of Divinity; University of Newcastle; James Cook University

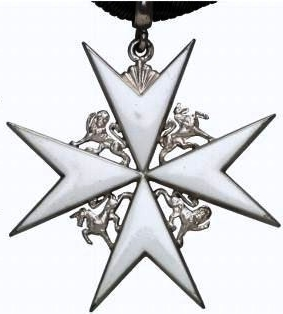
Insignia of ChStJ

Philip Leslie Freier (born 9 February 1955) is a retired Australian Anglican bishop. He was the 13th Archbishop of Melbourne from 2006 until his retirement in 2025. He was Primate of Australia from June 2014 until March 2020. Previously, he served as Bishop of the Northern Territory between 1999 and 2006.

== Early life, education and work ==
Freier was born in Brisbane where he attended Hendra State High School and was raised in the Roman Catholic Church.

In addition to a PhD from James Cook University, he has received the degrees of Master of Educational Studies from the University of Newcastle, Bachelor of Divinity from the Melbourne College of Divinity, Diploma of Education from the University of Queensland and Bachelor of Applied Science from the Queensland Institute of Technology.

Freier was elected a fellow of the Australian Institute of Company Directors in 1995. He was a science teacher for six years prior to being ordained.

== Ministry ==
After his ordination in 1982, Freier was a curate in Kowanyama, Queensland, followed by five years as the rector of St Oswald's Banyo, before becoming the rector of Christ Church Bundaberg. During his time in Kowanyama he studied and became a fluent speaker of one of the local indigenous languages, the Koko-Bera language and is now one of only approximately 50 speakers of this endangered tongue.

In 1999, Freier was elected as the Bishop of the Northern Territory and consecrated on 22 July at St John's Cathedral (Brisbane). As a supporter of the indigenous Australian communities he pledged to support the Stolen Generations during their healing process. In April 2014, he wrote an opinion piece in Fairfax Media newspapers criticising the Australian government's "Operation Sovereign Borders" policy which places children in immigration detention, arguing that "churches cannot be silent" and must care for "the alien, orphan and widow". Freier has criticised large corporate banks in Australia, arguing that wealth creation should not be "separated from moral and social responsibility" and criticised the Abbott government for "privileging the financial interest of corporations".

Freier has been a chaplain to the Royal Australian Air Force Reserve since 2001.

Freier was elected as Anglican Primate of Australia on 28 June 2014, defeating Archbishop of Sydney Glenn Davies. He was installed as Primate by Archbishop of Canterbury Justin Welby in St Paul's Cathedral, Melbourne on 13 August 2014. Freier resigned as Primate effective 31 March 2020 and was replaced by Geoffrey Smith.

Freier retired as Archbishop of Melbourne on 9 February 2025, his 70th birthday.

== Personal life ==
Freier and his wife Joy have two children and three grandchildren. He includes bush-walking, reading and the visual arts among his recreational pursuits.

== Honours ==
- - Chaplain, Most Venerable Order of Saint John (ChStJ)

Styles of Philip Freier
- Reference style: The Most Reverend
- Spoken style: Your Grace
- Religious style: Archbishop

== See also ==
- Who's Who in Australia

Anglican Communion titles
Preceded by Richard Appleby	Bishop of the Northern Territory; 1999–2006	Succeeded by Greg Thompson
Preceded by Peter Watson	Archbishop of Melbourne; 2006–2025	Succeeded by Vacant
Preceded by Phillip Aspinall	Primate of Australia; 2014–2020	Succeeded by Geoffrey Smith
