= Thomas Armstrong (bishop) =

Thomas Armstrong.

Thomas Henry Armstrong (born 2 April 1857, Dublin - died 23 March 1930) was a bishop of the Church of England in Australia (now the Anglican Church of Australia).

== Education ==
He was educated at Geelong Grammar School, The Geelong College and Trinity College (University of Melbourne) (BA 1880, MA 1883). He was ordained deacon by Bishop James Moorhouse in December 1880 and priest in 1881,

== Ordained ministry ==
He was curate of Christ Church, St Kilda (1881–83) and Christ Church, Hawthorn (1883), first vicar of St Columb's, Hawthorn (1883–94), and Archdeacon of Gippsland (1894–1902). He was rural dean of Sale (1896–99), and a canon of St Paul's Cathedral, Melbourne and examining chaplain to the Bishop of Melbourne (1899–1902).

On 24 February 1902 he was consecrated as the first Bishop of Wangaratta. During his tenure the bishop's lodge was built, St Columb's Hall for the education of clergy established and a cathedral partially completed.

In 1903 he was awarded an honorary DD by the University of Trinity College, Toronto, Ontario, Canada.

On Friday, 11 March 1910, Bishop Armstrong dedicated St Clement’s Church of England Eurobin in the presence of a very large congregation. The bishop was attended by his chaplain, the Rev. G.E. Lamble, Th.L. The Rev. A.R. Noakes, Th.L., and the Rev. J.L. Watt also participated in the service. The Bishop selected Genesis 28:17 for his sermon: “This is none other than the house of God, and this is the gate of heaven.”

He retired on 31 March 1927 and became acting incumbent of St John's Toorak and was president of the Melbourne College of Divinity in 1930.

== Family ==
He married Marion Ruth Henty on 19 May 1892.
