= Clyde Wood =

Australian Anglican bishop

Clyde Maurice Wood AM (born 7 January 1936) is a retired Australian Anglican bishop.

Wood was educated at Monash University and ordained in 1965. His first ordained ministry position was as a curate of St John's Bentleigh. From 1966 he was curate-in-charge of St Paul's Ringwood. He then held positions at St Philip's Mount Waverley and St Christopher's Armadale, all parishes in Melbourne. In 1978 he became Dean of Christ Church Cathedral, Darwin, and in 1983 he became the second Bishop of the Northern Territory, a position he held until 1992. For four years he was an assistant bishop in the Diocese of Brisbane and in 1996 he was elected diocesan Bishop of North Queensland and installed there on 12 October 1996. He retired in 2002. He is married to Margaret Wood.

Anglican Communion titles
Preceded by Kenneth Bruce Mason	Bishop of the Northern Territory; 1983 –1992	Succeeded by Richard Franklin Appleby
Preceded by Hurtle John Lewis	Bishop of North Queensland; 1996 –2002	Succeeded by John Ashley Noble
