= Keith Rayner (bishop) =

Australian Anglican bishop (1929–2025)

The Most Reverend Keith Rayner AO
- Primate of Australia; Archbishop of Melbourne
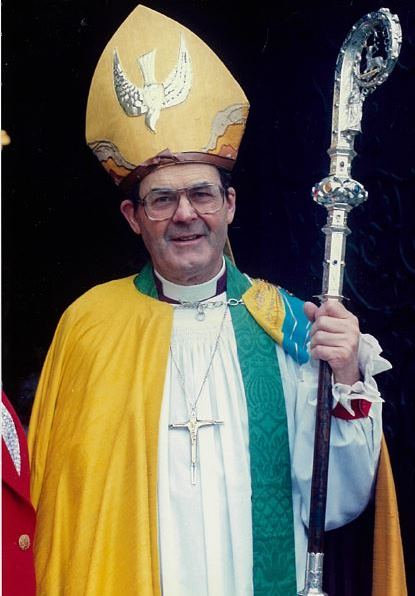
- Church: Anglican Church of Australia
- Province: Victoria
- Diocese: Melbourne
- In office: 1991–1999 (as primate); 1990–1999 (as archbishop)
- Predecessor: John Grindrod; (as primate); David Penman; (as archbishop)
- Successor: Peter Carnley; (as primate); Peter Watson; (as archbishop)
- Previous posts: Acting Primate; (1989–1991); Archbishop of Adelaide; (1975–1990); Bishop of Wangaratta; (1969–1975)

Orders
- Ordination: 1953 (as priest)
- Consecration: 24 June 1969

Personal details
- Born: Keith Rayner; 22 November 1929
- Died: 12 January 2025 (aged 95)
- Spouse: Audrey Rayner
- Education: University of Queensland

Keith Rayner (22 November 1929 – 12 January 2025) was an Australian Anglican bishop and former Anglican Primate of Australia. He was Archbishop of Melbourne from 1990 to 1999. He was previously Archbishop of Adelaide from 1975 to 1990 and Bishop of Wangaratta from 1969 to 1975.

== Life and career ==
Rayner was educated at the Church of England Grammar School in Brisbane, Queensland (now known as the Anglican Church Grammar School and popularly called "Churchie"). and the University of Queensland. He was ordained priest in 1953. His first ordained ministry position was as chaplain at St Francis' Theological College in Brisbane, followed by incumbencies in Sunnybank and Wynnum, during which time he completed his doctoral thesis on the history of Anglicanism within the Anglican Diocese of Brisbane.

In 1969, Rayner became Bishop of Wangarrata in Victoria: he was consecrated a bishop on 24 June at St Paul's Cathedral, Melbourne. In 1975 he was translated to the see of Adelaide in South Australia as its archbishop. During his time in Adelaide he was appointed to be an officer of the Order of Australia (OA).

From 1990 to 1999, he was Archbishop of Melbourne. He was widely appreciated for his "masterly presidential style" and as a preacher. From 1989 to 1991, he was Acting Primate of Australia and then the Primate of Australia from 1991 to 1999. While archbishop and primate he supported the ordination of women to the priesthood and ordained the first women priests in the Diocese of Melbourne in 1992.

Rayner died on 12 January 2025 at the age of 95.

== See also ==
- Ordination of women in the Anglican communion
- List of the first women ordained as priests in the Anglican Church of Australia in 1992

Anglican Communion titles
Preceded by Theodore McCall	Bishop of Wangaratta; 1969–1975	Succeeded by Max Thomas
Preceded by Tom Reed	Archbishop of Adelaide; 1975–1990	Succeeded by Ian George
Preceded by David Penman	Archbishop of Melbourne; 1990–1999	Succeeded by Peter Watson
Preceded by John Grindrod	Primate of Australia; 1991–1999 (Acting Primate 1989–1991)	Succeeded by Peter Carnley
