= Max Thomas (bishop) =

Former Anglican bishop

Maxwell McNee Thomas (23 August 1926 - 8 October 2008) was an Australian Anglican bishop.

Thomas' father was the Revd Charles Elliot Thomas, sometime vicar of Upper Clarence. He was educated at St. Paul's College, Sydney. He was ordained deacon in 1950 and priest in 1952 and was a curate at East Maitland (1950-52) and Richmond, Surrey (1952-54). Returning to Australia, he was curate at Singleton (1954-55) and then priest in charge, then rector, of The Entrance, New South Wales (1955-59). After this he was a fellow and tutor at the General Theological Seminary, New York (1959-64), from where he obtained a DTh (1964). He was a chaplain at the University of Melbourne from 1964 to 1968 and then the consultant theologian to the Archbishop of Melbourne. In 1975 he was ordained to the episcopate as the sixth Bishop of Wangaratta, a post he held for a decade. His last post before retirement was as warden of his alma mater, St Paul's College, Sydney (1985-94).

He died in 2008, aged 82.

Anglican Communion titles
Preceded by Keith Rayner	Bishop of Wangaratta; 1975–1985	Succeeded by Robert Beal
