= David Penman =

Australian archbishop

David John Penman (8 August 1936 – 1 October 1989) was the 10th Anglican Archbishop of Melbourne.

== Early life and career ==
Born in Wellington, New Zealand, on 8 August 1936, Penman received his secondary education at Hutt Valley High School, and studied Physical Education as part of teacher training at Wellington Teachers' College (now a part of the Victoria University of Wellington's Faculty of Education). He was accepted as a candidate for ordination by Archbishop Reginald Herbert Owen, and entered theological training at College House (University of Canterbury), and the University of New Zealand.

He was ordained deacon in 1961 and priest in 1962. His first post was as a curate at Wanganui from 1961 to 1964, followed by a decade of missionary work in Pakistan and the Middle East. In 1972, he completed a PhD in Sociology at the University of Karachi.

In 1975 he was appointed Principal of St Andrew's Hall a Church Mission Society missionary training college in Melbourne. He returned to New Zealand in 1979, where he was Vicar of All Saints' Church in Palmerston North.

== Archbishop of Melbourne ==
In 1982 he became a bishop coadjutor in the Diocese of Melbourne before becoming the archbishop two years later. Though remaining strongly Evangelical, he was passionately committed to dialogue between religious traditions. He ordained the first women to the diaconate in Melbourne in 1986 and was also a supporter of women's ordination to the priesthood in the Anglican church, proposing canons on this issue at three successive General Synods.

He was a member of the first Australian Palliative Care Council, President of the Australian Council of Churches, Patron of the National AIDS Trust and a member of the Australian National Council on AIDS. On his way to Britain for the 1988 Lambeth Conference he undertook a highly secretive detour to Iran in an ultimately unsuccessful attempt to secure the release of Terry Waite, the personal envoy of the Archbishop of Canterbury, and several other western hostages.

== Death and legacy ==
On 24 July 1989, after returning home from the Tokyo World Conference on Religion and Peace and the Lausanne Evangelical Congress in Manila, where he delivered a series of Bible studies, he suffered a severe heart attack. He was kept on life-support in Melbourne's St Vincent's hospital, but although he regained consciousness, he died on 1 October 1989. He was 53. His state funeral service was held at St Paul's Cathedral, Melbourne on 6 October 1989.

Religious titles
Preceded by Robert William Dann	Archbishop of Melbourne; 1984 –1989	Succeeded by Keith Rayner
