= David Farrer =

Australian bishop

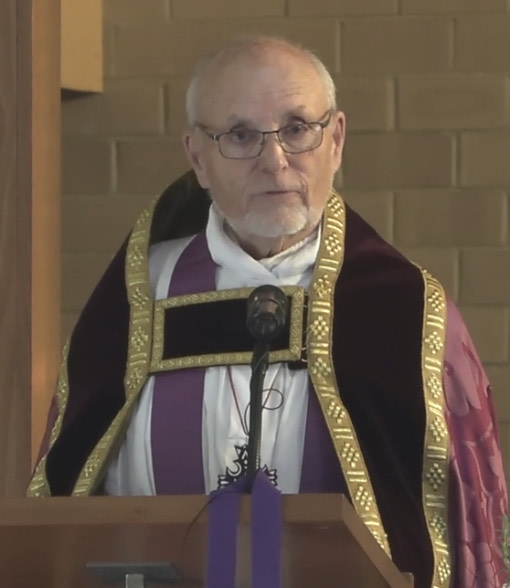

Ralph David Farrer (born May 1944) is an Australian retired Anglican bishop. He was formerly the Bishop of Wangaratta in the Anglican Church of Australia and more recently a vicar in the Church of England.

== Early life and education ==
Farrer was born in Surrey, England, and moved to Melbourne, Australia, with his family at a young age. After secondary school at Mentone Grammar School he attended a horticultural college in Melbourne, completing his apprenticeship as a horticulturalist before beginning training for the ordained ministry in Adelaide in 1965.

== Ministry ==
Farrer was ordained a priest in 1969 and served in several parishes, as a canon of St Paul's Cathedral, Melbourne, the Archdeacon of La Trobe and later as the Archdeacon of Melbourne and chaplain to the Parliament of Victoria.

Farrer's commitment to community work in Australia earned him the title of Citizen of the Year in Brunswick in 1983 "for work with the unemployed and homeless" and Commander of Merit with the Order of St Lazarus in 1994 for launching a street ministry initiative, the Lazarus Centre, in Melbourne.

Farrer was consecrated as bishop in 1998 at St Paul's Cathedral, Melbourne, and then enthroned as Bishop of Wangaratta at Holy Trinity Cathedral in Wangaratta, a rural diocese in Victoria. During his time in Wangaratta he helped to establish four low-fee Anglican schools in the diocese.

In 2008, Farrer was appointed vicar of the combined parishes of St Nicholas' Church in Arundel and St Leonard's Church in South Stoke, West Sussex, and also as an assistant bishop in the Diocese of Chichester in England; he retired from both posts in 2015 and returned to Australia. He is married to Helen Farrer.
