= Anglican Archbishop of Melbourne =

Anglican archbishopric in Australia

Archbishop of Melbourne
- Archbishopric

anglican
- Coat of arms of the Diocese
- Incumbent: Ric Thorpe since 30 November 2025
- Style: The Most Reverend

Location
- Country: Australia
- Ecclesiastical province: Victoria
- Residence: Bishopscourt, East Melbourne

Information
- First holder: Charles Perry
- Denomination: Anglican
- Established: Bishopric on 25 June 1847; Archbishopric in 1905
- Diocese: Melbourne
- Cathedral: St Paul's Cathedral, Melbourne

Website
- Diocese of Melbourne

The Archbishop of Melbourne is the diocesan bishop of the Anglican Diocese of Melbourne, Australia, and ex officio metropolitan bishop of the ecclesiastical Province of Victoria.

== List of bishops and archbishops of Melbourne ==
Bishops of Melbourne
No	From	Until	Incumbent	Notes
1	1847	1876	Charles Perry	Left the diocese in 1874 to return to England where he recruited the first Bishop of Ballarat and assisted in appointment of his successor; resigned in 1876.
2	1876	1886	James Moorhouse	Translated to Manchester.
3	1887	1901	Field Flowers Goe	
4	1902	1905	Lowther Clarke	Became Archbishop of Melbourne in 1905.
Archbishops of Melbourne
4	1905	1920	Lowther Clarke	Bishop of Melbourne until 1905.
5	1921	1929	Harrington Lees	Died in office.
6	1929	1941	Frederick Head	Died in office.
7	1942	1957	Joseph Booth	Previously coadjutor bishop in Melbourne (Bishop of Geelong) since 1934.
8	1957	1977	Sir Frank Woods	Translated from Middleton; also Primate of Australia from 1971; knighted in 1972.
9	1977	1983	Bob Dann	Previously coadjutor bishop in Melbourne since 1969.
10	1984	1989	David Penman	Previously coadjutor bishop in Melbourne since 1982; died in office.
11	1990	1999	Keith Rayner	Previously Bishop of Wangaratta, then Archbishop of Adelaide; also Primate of Australia from 1989.
12	2000	2005	Peter Watson	Previously Bishop in Parramatta and then of the Southern Region (both in Sydney diocese).
13	2006	2025	Philip Freier	Translated from the Northern Territory; also Primate of Australia from 2014 to 2020.
14	2025	incumbent	Ric Thorpe	Elected 24 May 2025; installed 30 November 2025. Translated from the Diocese of London (suffragan Bishop of Islington).
