= Robert Beal (bishop) =

Australian Anglican bishop (1929–2009)

Robert George Beal (17 August 1929 – 24 June 2009) was an Australian Anglican bishop.

Beal was educated at Sydney Grammar School and the University of Newcastle, Australia. He was ordained in 1953 and was a curate at St Francis’ Nundah, Brisbane. He later held incumbencies in South Townsville and Auchenflower. After this he was the Dean of Wangaratta (1965–1972) and then Newcastle (1975–1983). He was also Archdeacon of Albury for the last two years. In 1985 he was ordained to the episcopate as the seventh Bishop of Wangaratta, a position he held for nine years.

Beal died in Newcastle in 2009 and his ashes were interred in Wangaratta.

Anglican Communion titles
Preceded by Max Thomas	Bishop of Wangaratta; 1985–1994	Succeeded by Paul Richardson
