= Thomas Armour =

Thomas Makinson Armour (8 August 1890 – 20 January 1963) was a bishop in the Anglican Church of Australia. He was born on 8 August 1890 in New Springs, near Chorley, Lancashire.

== Education ==
He was educated at Durham University as a member of St Chad's College and ordained in 1916.

== Career ==
He served as an Army Chaplain and afterwards as Vicar of Orford, Cheshire. In 1928 he went to Australia as a member of the Brotherhood of the Good Shepherd at Dubbo. He was principal from 1929 until he became Dean of Newcastle in 1936.

In 1943 he was appointed Bishop of Wangaratta, a position he held until his death in 1963.

== Family ==
He married Flora Calder in 1944. Armour died in 1963, aged 72. He is buried in Wangaratta Cemetery. There is a memorial window to Armour in Wangaratta Cathedral.
