= Province of Victoria =

Ecclesiastical province of the Anglican Church of Australia

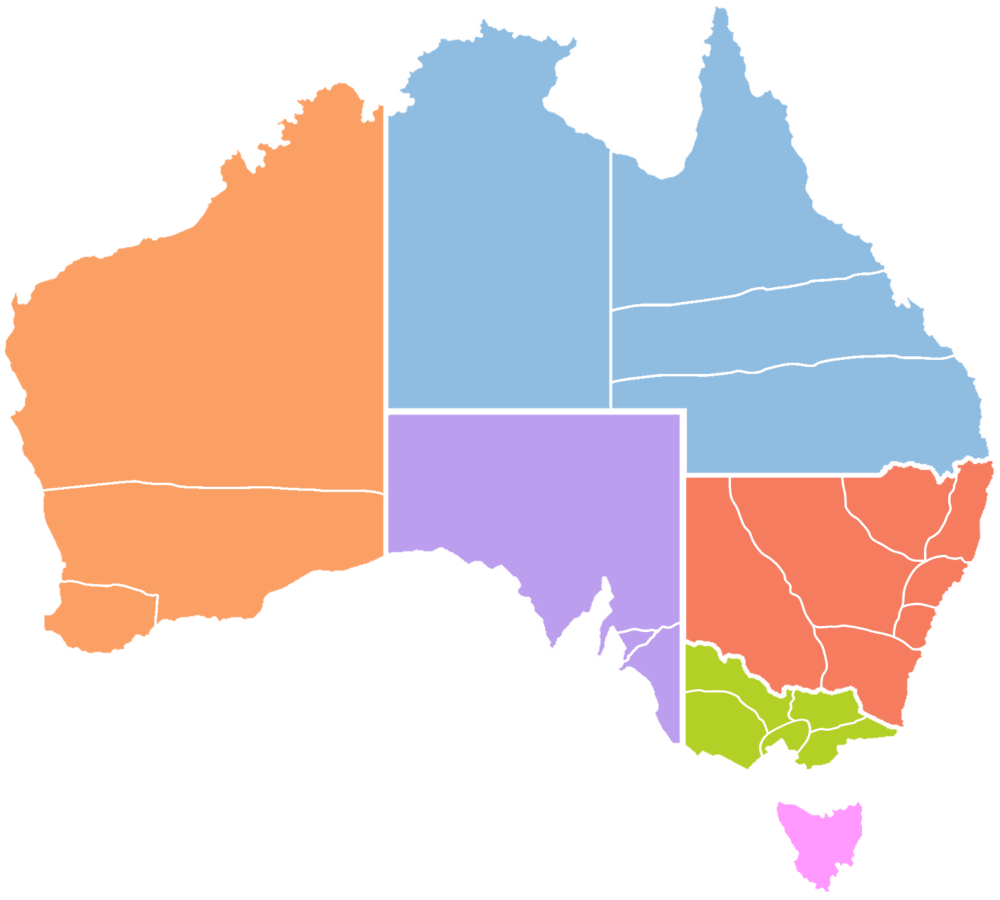
- Location of the Province (depicted in green) in Australia
- Church: Anglican Church of Australia
- Metropolitan bishop: Archbishop of Melbourne
- Cathedral: St Paul's Cathedral, Melbourne
- Dioceses: Five

The Province of Victoria is an ecclesiastical province of the Anglican Church of Australia. It consists of the State of Victoria and some New South Wales parishes in the Diocese of Wangaratta.

The province consists of five dioceses: Ballarat, Bendigo, Gippsland, Melbourne and Wangaratta. The metropolitan of the province is the Archbishop of Melbourne.
