= Anglican Diocese of the Northern Territory =

Diocese of the Anglican Church of Australia

Coordinates: 20°0′S 133°0′E

Diocese of the Northern Territory
- Coat of arms

Location
- Country: Australia
- Territory: Northern Territory
- Ecclesiastical province: Queensland
- Metropolitan: Archbishop of Brisbane
- Headquarters: 2 Smith Street; (Cnr The Esplanade); Darwin NT 0800

Information
- Denomination: Anglican
- Rite: Book of Common Prayer; An Australian Prayer Book; A Prayer Book for Australia
- Established: 1968
- Cathedral: Christ Church Cathedral, Darwin
- Language: English; Local languages

Current leadership
- Parent church: Anglican Church of Australia
- Bishop: Greg Anderson; (since 2014)

Website
- ntanglican.org.au

The Anglican Diocese of the Northern Territory covers Australia's Northern Territory and is part of the Province of Queensland in the Anglican Church of Australia.

The first Bishop of the Northern Territory was consecrated in 1968. The cathedral church of the diocese is Christ Church Cathedral, Darwin. The fifth bishop, Greg Thompson, resigned to become the Bishop of Newcastle, New South Wales. In June 2014 the diocese announced the appointment of Greg Anderson as the sixth bishop. He was consecrated and appointed in November 2014.

The current Dean of Christ Church Cathedral, Darwin, is Rob Llewellyn, who was installed on 16 October 2020. Llewellyn previously held the position of Rector of Gloucester in the Diocese of Newcastle.

== Cathedral ==
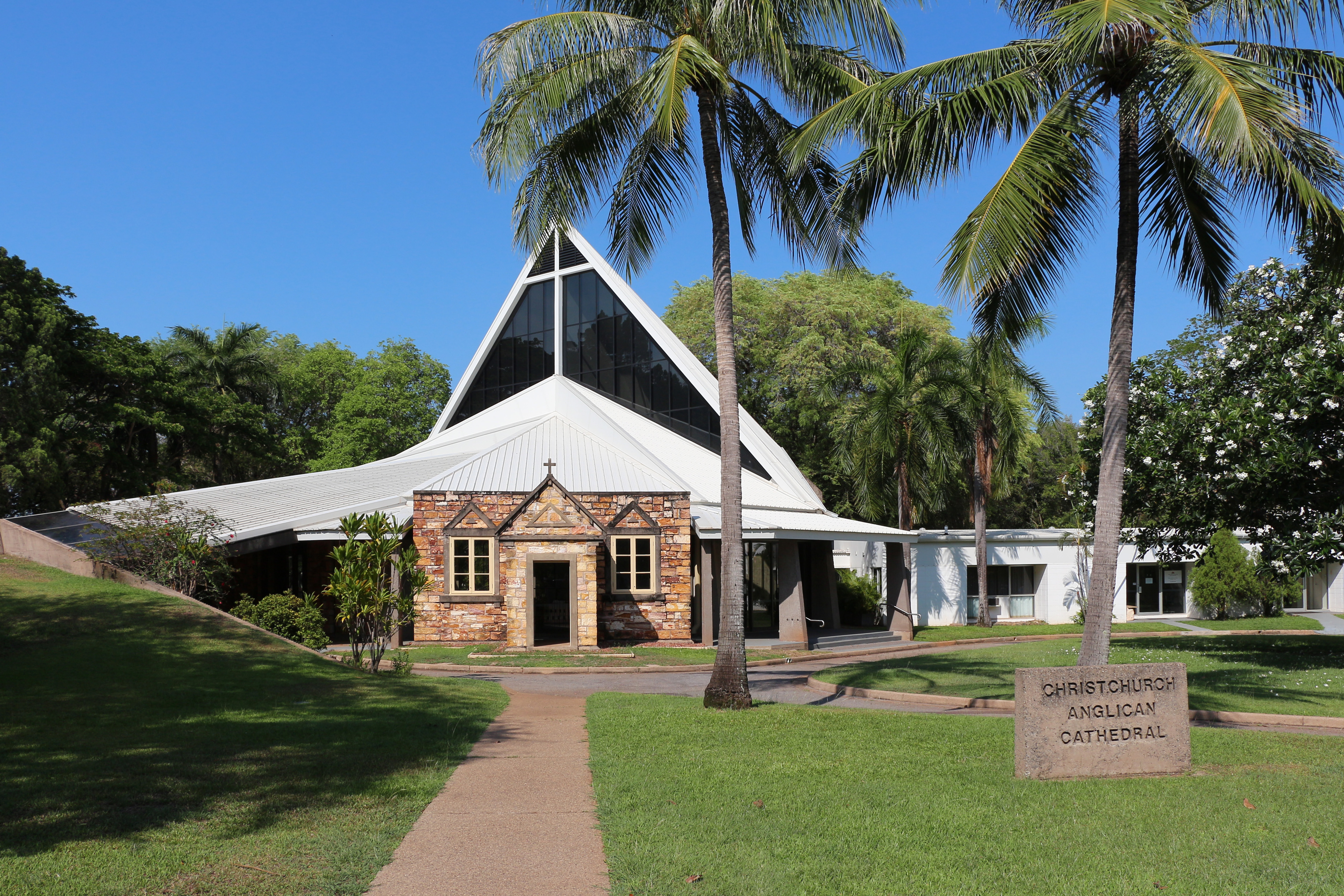
Christ Church Cathedral, Darwin

Christ Church Anglican Cathedral first became a cathedral in 1968 when the Anglican Diocese of the Northern Territory was established in 1968 out of the larger Diocese of Carpentaria, which covered the Northern Territory, North Queensland and the Tiwi Islands. It was the largest diocese in the world. The Northern Territory diocese is "the youngest of the 23 dioceses (regions) of the Anglican Church of Australia". The cathedral was almost totally destroyed by Cyclone Tracy in 1974.

The present cathedral was completed in 1977 on the site of the previous building, incorporating the surviving porch of the old church. The porch had been constructed in 1944 by the Australian Navy. The back wall of the new octagonal building was formed from reclaimed stone from the old church. Many of the treasures of the original building were recovered and repaired. The cathedral underwent many repairs and renovations since its construction in 1902.

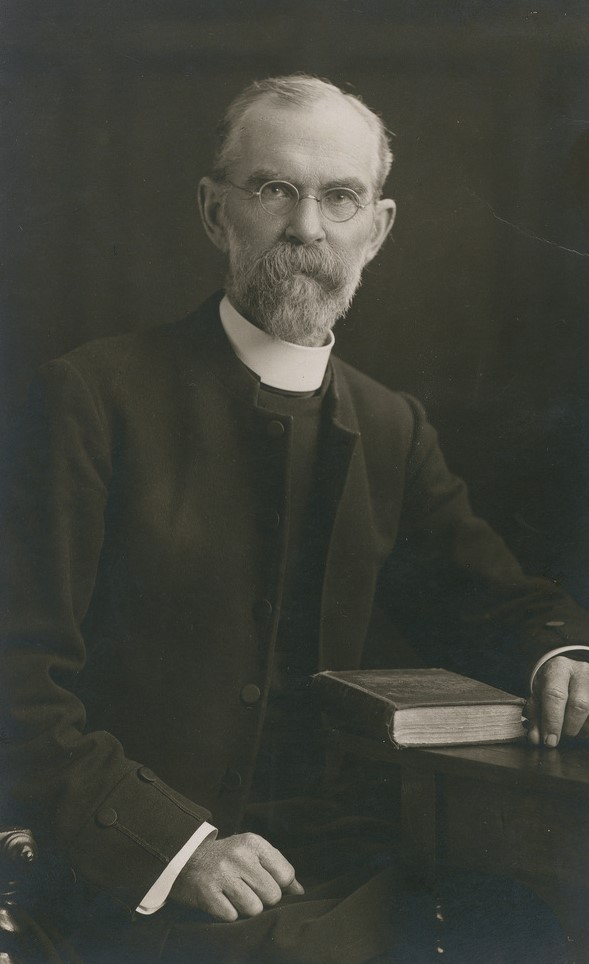
Gilbert White, first bishop of the Diocese of Carpentaria

== Construction of the cathedral ==
Before the church was constructed, "services were held in the town hall and the courthouse", attended by the "Anglican community of Palmerston", as the town of Palmerston did not officially become known as Darwin until 1913 and was not given city status until 1959. In 1900, the Diocese of Carpentaria was formed, and Bishop Gilbert White was consecrated as the first bishop of the diocese. He first visited Palmerston and the Northern Territory in February 1901 and in that year "a committee was set up to purchase a block of land for a church".

=== Lot 406 and Lot 407 ===
Lot 407 is the block upon which the first church was built. The original owner of the land was Matthew Bennet. The land would eventually be mortgaged when Bennet "was 'seized of an estate in fee simple' of the lot" on 21 July 1875. The title was transferred John Garlick Pitcher on 6 July 1882 when the mortgage was discharged. The title eventually transferred to David Daniels on 24 January 1891, and eventually to Bishop White. The recorded transfer to White was registered on 11 November 1903, but "due to delays in solicitor's offices, government departments etc." and consideration of the church finishing its construction in October 1902, it is more likely that the land was purchased in this year, and "Bishop White consecrated the building on 2 November 1902."

Lot 406 is where the rectory was built. Lot 551, "which is in Bennett St ... near the Knuckey St intersection, was bought" by an Englishwoman, a Miss Ridley, as an offer to the parish to purchase a block of land to build a rectory in July 1909. Lot 551 ended up being sold when the Northern Territory fell into recession, leaving the parish with "no money to put up a building." Lot 551 was eventually sold in 1911 and in 1912 a "Mr Waters (a member of the parochial council) had sold Lot 406 to the church." The rector did not move in until 1913, the end of the lease for the previous tenants, "the newly established Northern Territory Aboriginals Department, and a building which was used by and for Aboriginal people." No water tank was put up, and "in January 1917 an order to vacate was issued", follow issues faced with white ants. Eventually, "the first dedicated rectory was built, for £751, in 1917".

== Cyclone Tracy ==
On Christmas morning, 1974, Darwin was struck by Cyclone Tracy. The recorded wind gusts recorded “217 km/h before the anemometer was destroyed”, with “Maximum gusts estimated to 240 km/h.” The cathedral, like much of Darwin, was destroyed. All that remained was the porch, where it remains today, but the church hall and the rectory were rubble. Efforts were made to recover and repair any items of significance from the destruction. Two brass plaques made in commemoration of two parishioners who were killed in action in the First World War were recovered and are currently “mounted in the porch” of the original church. There is a time capsule placed in the narthex of the cathedral, prepared by “local historian and long-time church warden, Peter Spillett”, who had also “recovered the pieces of the rector’s chair for reconstruction.”

The present-day cathedral was built on the site of the original between 1975 and 1976, with the surviving porch remaining in front of the church, and “On Sunday 13 March 1977 in the presence of the Archbishop of Canterbury Christ Church Cathedral was consecrated.” The new cathedral was visited by Queen Elizabeth II and the Duke of Edinburgh a few weeks later, with the Queen's signature “recorded in a special visitors’ book commemorating the consecration and the royal visit.”

=== Cyclone Tracy Memorial Window ===
Darwin artist George Chaloupka (1932-2011) was commissioned to design the Cyclone Tracy Memorial Window. The colours and black curved lines represent “fishing nets and the upsurge of waves during a cyclone.” The Dalle de Verre window was done in commemoration of the fishermen who lost their lives when Cyclone Tracy struck and “was financed by a Gollin Kyokuyo Trust fund”. Gollin Kyokuyo “was a joint fishing venture operating out of Darwin at the time of Cyclone Tracy” and seven fishermen were killed. A plaque commemorating the fishermen is placed behind the porch of the original Church.

== Post-Tracy cathedral ==
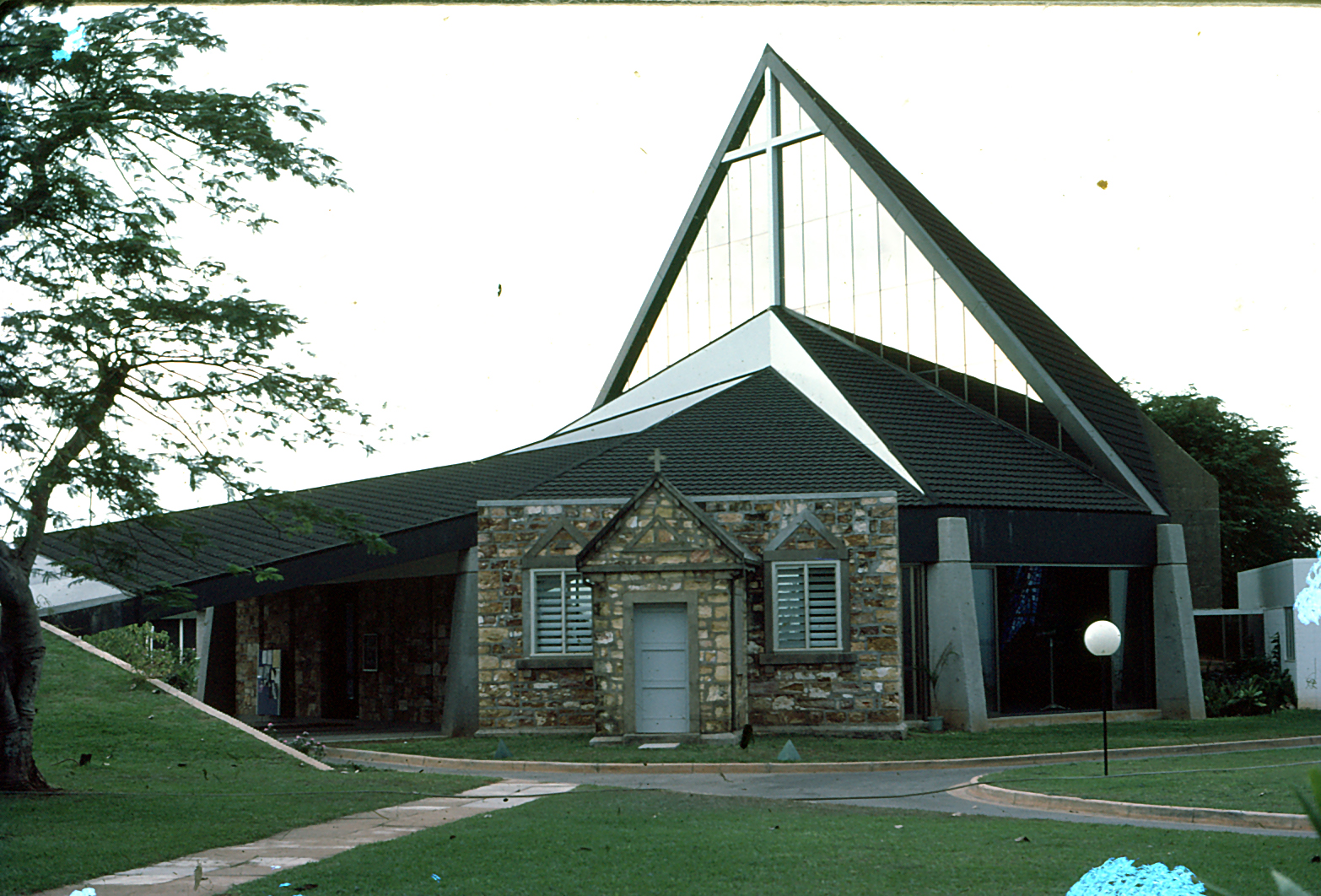
The surviving porch of the original church standing in front of the new cathedral in 1978. Author: Ken Hodge

The new cathedral suffered continuous roof leaks. Considering the cathedral's significance to the city, the Northern Territory Government “granted $14,000 for repair of the roof” in 1988. Despite the repairs, the roof continued to leak. $30,000 was raised by the parish “to re-roof the building.” The leaks did not stop until 2011, when then dean, Jeremy Greaves, engaged the cathedral “in extensive fund-raising” which saw the cathedral reroofed and large fans installed. Since then, there have been no leaks in the building.

=== List of deans ===
- Source: Cathedral website
- 2020–present: Rob Llewellyn
- 2013–2019: Keith Joseph (afterwards Bishop of North Queensland, 2019)
- 2007–2013: Jeremy Greaves (afterwards Assistant Bishop of Brisbane, Northern Region, 2017)
- 2003–2007: Michael Nixon
- 1998–2000: Dennis Vanderwolf
- 1992–1997: Michael Chiplin
- 1983–1992: Murray Johnson
- 1968–1983: Clyde Wood (afterwards Bishop of the Northern Territory, 1983)
