= Maurice Kelly (priest) =

Australian Anglican priest and founder of two religious orders

Maurice Richard Daustini Kelly (5 August 1884 – 8 October 1926) was an Australian priest in the Church of England in Australia (as the Anglican Church of Australia was then called). He was the co-founder of two Anglican religious communities.

== Early life ==
Kelly was born in 1884 in Hitchin, Hertfordshire, the son of the Rev Richard Charles Nugent Kelly (1858-1936) and Emma Louise Edith Cremer (1858-1924). At the time his father was curate at St Mary's, Hitchin. His uncle was the orientalist painter Robert George Talbot Kelly and his grandfather the Irish landscape and portrait painter Robert George Kelly.

Nugent Kelly was chaplain of St Andrew's, Gothenburg from 1886 to 1890 and then emigrated to Tasmania, where the young Maurice grew up. He attended Dookie Agricultural College, where he was a gold medallist.

== Clerical career ==
In 1908 Kelly attended the Anglo-Catholic St John's Theological College, Melbourne to be trained for ordination. He received his LTh from the Australian College of Theology in 1910. He was ordained deacon in 1910 and priest in 1911.

Kelly was a curate at All Saints, Geelong West (1910–12), incumbent at St Catherine's, Caulfield (1912–14) and a curate at Christ Church, South Yarra (1914–18). Overlapping with the latter, he was a temporary chaplain to the Forces (1916–19), returning in Europe after the War to be a curate at St Mary's, Ecclesfield, South Yorkshire (at that time the West Riding of Yorkshire) (1919–20) whilst also training for the religious life at the Community of the Resurrection.

== Religious orders ==
=== Association of the Divine Call ===
In 1908, two students at St John's Theological College decided to form a religious community, the Association of the Divine Call, with three-year vows of celibacy. The two students were Kelly and Gerard Kennedy Tucker. Tucker had previously studied for ordination at St Wilfrid's Theological College, Cressy, where, at the time (1906 to 1907), the warden of St Wilfred's was Nugent Kelly, the father of Maurice. Three other students joined. The establishment of the Association received a lukewarm response from Archbishop Lowther Clarke, and, after ordination to the diaconate in 1910, the members of the community went their own ways. Tucker went on to found the Brotherhood of St Laurence in 1930 and the Food for Peace Campaign in 1953 (which eventually became Oxfam Australia).

=== Community of the Ascension ===
Lewis Radford was appointed Bishop of Goulburn in 1915, in succession to Christopher Barlow. Barlow had died in 1914, having seen his former episcopal residence, Bishopthorpe, be severely damaged by fire the previous year. Radford was the first Anglo-Catholic bishop of Goulburn, and his impact was promptly felt. During Radford's episcopacy, Goulburn became the only bush diocese to have four religious orders. One of those was the Community of the Ascension.

In 1918, at the end of WWI, three army chaplains resolved to form a religious community; and in that year Radford offered them the ruins of Bishopthorpe. The three army chaplains were Kelly, and two others: Fr Edward Kempe and Fr Stanley Homersham. The three were sent to the Community of the Resurrection in Mirfield in England for two years, to experience community life, and the House of the Ascension was opened on their return in 1921. The sequence of names is a logical one in theological terms for Kelly: from the Divine Call whilst as an ordinand, through the experience of Crucifixion as an army chaplain in the trenches, on to the Resurrection when learning to live the religious life, and through to the Ascension when professed in his own community.

The influence of the Community of the Resurrection was strong. The Rule and Constitution were very similar. The Community was featured in an early edition of the Australian pictorial magazine Pix in 1938, and the photographs show the Ascensionists wearing a habit which is almost identical to that worn by members of the Community of the Resurrection.

The Community reached a high point in 1935, with 12 professed members. The following year, however, the Superior, Harold Davies, went over to Rome, and the community began to decline. The Community dissipated in 1940–41, with many members joining up, but was not formally dissolved until 1943.

== Personal life ==
Kelly died in 1926, aged 42, at the St John the Evangelist home for boys in Canterbury, Victoria, having been ill for a long time. The Superintendent of St John's Home at the time of Kelly's death was the Rev Eric Thornton, one of the members of Kelly's Association of the Divine Call in 1908-10. Along with a lay-brother (Br Peter Pilditch), he was buried in the grounds of the House of the Ascension in Goulburn. After the Community closed, Kelly and Pilditch's bodies were reinterred at St Saviour's Cathedral.

== Legacy ==
The Community had a large and striking outdoor crucifix, cast in bronze by the Belgian sculptor, Aloïs de Beule, and located within a calvary garden. The crucifix was given as a memorial to Kelly and dedicated by Bishop Radford in 1930. The Community of the Holy Name is an order of Anglican nuns in Australia. The CHN ran a girls' home in Goulburn, and, on the closure of the House of Ascension, the Community gave de Beule's crucifix to them. The crucifix is now located in a calvary garden of CHN's house in Cheltenham in Melbourne.

In 1928 two sanctuary chairs were given in memory of Kelly at All Saints, Geelong West, where he had been curate.
