= Community of the Ascension =

Former Anglican religious order in Australia

The Community of the Ascension (known as CA and the Ascensionists) was an Anglican religious community for men in Goulburn, New South Wales, Australia. It was the first male Anglican religious order to be successfully established in Australia, in 1921, and existed until it dissipated in 1940 and then formally dissolved in 1943.

== Early origins ==
St John's Theological College, Melbourne was established in 1906, and was strongly Anglo-Catholic. In 1908, two students at St John's decided to form a religious community, the Association of the Divine Call, with three-year vows of celibacy. The two students were Maurice Richard Daustini Kelly and Gerard Kennedy Tucker. Tucker had previously studied for ordination at St Wilfrid's Theological College, Cressy. At the time (1906 to 1907), the warden of St Wilfred's was the Rev Nugent Kelly, the father of Maurice. Three other students joined. The establishment of the Association received a lukewarm response from Archbishop Lowther Clarke, and, after ordination in 1910, the members of the community went their own ways. Kelly went on to co-found the Community of the Ascension in 1921, but died just five years later. Tucker founded the Brotherhood of St Laurence in 1930 and the Food for Peace Campaign in 1953 (which eventually became Oxfam Australia).

== Bishop Radford's foundation ==
Lewis Radford was appointed Bishop of Goulburn in 1915, in succession to Christopher Barlow. Barlow had died in 1914, having seen his former episcopal residence, Bishopthorpe, be severely damaged by fire the previous year. Radford was the first Anglo-Catholic bishop of Goulburn, and his impact was promptly felt. During Radford's episcopacy, Goulburn became the only bush diocese to have four religious orders. One of those was the Community of the Ascension.

In 1918, at the end of WWI, three army chaplains resolved to form a religious community; and in that year Radford offered them the ruins of Bishopthorpe. The three army chaplains were Fr Maurice Kelly of the Association of the Divine Call of 1908, and two others: Fr Edward Kempe and Fr Stanley Homersham. The three were sent to Mirfield in England for two years, to experience community life, and the House of the Ascension was opened on their return in 1921. The sequence of names is a logical one in theological terms for Kelly: from the Divine Call while as an ordinand, through the experience of Crucifixion as an army chaplain in the trenches, on to the Resurrection when learning to live the religious life, through to the Ascension when professed in his own community.

The influence of the Community of the Resurrection was strong. The Rule and Constitution were very similar. The Community was featured in an early edition of the Australian pictorial magazine Pix in 1938, and the photographs show the Ascensionists wearing a habit which is almost identical to that worn by members of the Community of the Resurrection.

Bishop Barlow had established a theological college, the Clergy Training College, in 1906. It was short-lived, and had closed by the time Bishop Radford offered Bishopthorpe to the founders of the Community of the Ascension, as one of Radford's aims was the establishment of a theological college along the lines of Mirfield or Kelham. Nothing came of this, and there would not be an Anglican monastic theological college in Australia until 1947, when the Society of the Sacred Mission established St Michael's House near Adelaide.

The House was built by the noted Australian ecclesiastical architect, Louis Williams. Williams built the Ascensionists' living quarters and chapel (including an ambulatory) out of the former stables, hay loft, and attached buildings of Bishopthorpe. The chapel bell (D flat) was cast specifically for it by the English bell-foundry John Taylor & Co. The garden was laid out as a Calvary, in the nature of an outdoor chapel. The Community had a large and striking outdoor crucifix, cast in bronze by the Belgian sculptor, Aloïs de Beule, and located within the calvary garden. The crucifix was given as a memorial to Maurice Kelly, the co-founder, who died in 1926, and was dedicated by Bishop Radford in 1930.

The Community experienced a number of points of discord. The original vows of poverty, chastity and obedience were for five years. In 1928 these were extended to life-long. One of the consequences was that the first Superior, Edward Kempe, left the Community (and promptly married). The Community reached a high point in 1935, with 12 professed members. The following year, however, the Superior, Harold Davies, went over to Rome, and the community began to decline.

== Papua New Guinea ==
Despite its troubles, the Community had one last moment of potential glory ahead of itself. Shortly before he retired as Bishop of British New Guinea in 1936, Henry Newton asked the Community to open a branch house in New Guinea in 1937. In doing so he noted that one priest was already in training. That priest was James Benson, who had joined the Community in 1921 on the understanding that he would be sent to New Guinea, where he had previously served. The Community reversed its decision, upon which Benson left it, and went to New Guinea as a diocesan priest.

Benson went on to narrowly survive becoming one of the Martyrs of New Guinea (Anglican missionaries murdered by the Japanese and pagan tribesmen in WWII), and was presumed dead for three years, until he stumbled out of the jungle in 1945. Benson then painted a large fresco of the martyrs on the sanctuary wall of Ss Peter and Paul Cathedral, Dogura as a memorial to them.

== Closure and legacy ==
The Community dissipated in 1940–41, with many members joining up, but was not formally dissolved until 1943. From 1941 to 1943 the House of Ascension was home to St Gabriel's School, Waverley, in Sydney, run by the Community of the Sisters of the Church, in order to keep the girls safe from Japanese bombardment.

When the members of the Community went in their different directions in 1940 and 1941, two members, who were brothers, moved to Brisbane and parish work, but formed themselves as the Oratory of the Love of God. Eric and Darryl Cassidy lived together until 1950, when Eric went to Papua & New Guinea in 1950 at the invitation of Bishop Philip Strong to separately establish Newton Theological College out of St Aidan's College. In the 1960s Darryl also went to Papua & New Guinea.

The Community of the Holy Name is an order of Anglican nuns in Australia (separate from the Community of the Holy Name in England). The CHN ran a girls' home in Goulburn, and, on the closure of the House of Ascension, the Community gave de Beule's crucifix to them. The crucifix is now located in a calvary garden of CHN's house in Cheltenham in Melbourne. Some of the furnishings from the Community's chapel are now located in the Ascension Chapel (named for the Community) at St Saviour's Cathedral. The bell was installed at St Nicholas' Church, North Goulburn, in 1951.

Having been a diocesan conference centre, Bishopthorpe is now a private residence. The chapel still exists, and has been used for civil weddings.

Fr Kelly and Br Peter Pilditch were buried at the House of the Ascension. After the Community closed, their bodies were reinterred at St Saviour's Cathedral.

== Superiors ==
- Edward Challis Kempe (1881-1965), 1921–28. Kempe left the Community in 1928, and in the same year married.
- Arthur Stanley Homersham (1879-1968), 1928–30.
- Harold Davies (1890-1967), 1930–36. Davies went over to Rome in 1936, initially with the intention of preparing at the Beda College in Rome for ordination as a Catholic priest, but, the following year, as a layman, married.
- Henry Cecil Cohen (1889-1982), 1936–40. Cohen was the Superior when the Community dispersed in 1940. He was the subject of a painting by the artist Constance Tempe Manning (1897-1960), which was a finalist in the 1939 Archibald Prize. In 1949 he became a member of the Community of the Resurrection, and remained a member until his death in 1982.
- Charles Henry Copp (1893-1970), 1940–43. Copp was the last Superior, until the Community was formally disbanded in 1943. He married in 1944.

== Notable members ==
- John Armstrong (bishop of Bermuda) (1905–92). Armstrong, who was Bishop of Bermuda from 1963 to 1970, was briefly a member of the Community from 1932 to 1933.
- James Benson (1887-1955). Benson, who narrowly avoided becoming one of the New Guinea Martyrs in WWII, was a member of the Community from 1929 to 1937.
- Brothers Darrell Price Cassidy (1903–62) and Eric Lefroy Cassidy (1901–78) were members of the Community from 1932 to 1940. They formed themselves as the Oratory of the Love of God when the Community dispersed in 1940.
