= Community of the Holy Name (Australia) =

Anglican religious order in Australia

The Community of the Holy Name (CHN) is an Anglican religious community for women in the Melbourne suburb of Cheltenham, Victoria, Australia. In 1912 it became the first Anglican religious order to be successfully established in Australia, although the founders established a community in 1888 from which date the community traces its origins. It is unrelated to the English Community of the Holy Name (also known as CHN).

== Origins ==
In 1886 Bishop James Moorhouse established the Deaconess Mission to the Streets and Lanes in Melbourne. Emma Silcock (later known as Sister and then Mother Esther) was a novice in the Community of St Mary the Virgin, Wantage, Oxfordshire, who had suffered an accident and, in 1888, arrived in Melbourne to recuperate there. She took over responsibility for the mission and was joined by Emma Okins (later known as Sister Ellen) and Christina Cameron (later known as Sister Christina) and, for a time, Mary Buckley, later to found the Community of the Servants of the Holy Cross in Charters Towers, Queensland (and to be known as Sister and then Mother Mary Gloriana). Okins and Cameron were set aside as deaconesses in 1890 by Bishop Field Flowers Goe. For churchmanship reasons, Mother Esther took her perpetual vows in Ballarat in 1894. It was not until 1911 that a member of the community took her vows before a bishop of Melbourne. In 1912, Archbishop Lowther Clarke formally chartered the sisters as the Community of the Holy Name, thereby becoming the first Anglican religious order in Australia.

== Community House, Cheltenham and other works ==
In 1892 the mission (which would eventually become Anglicare, the social justice arm of the Anglican Church of Australia) established a House of Mercy for pregnant young women in Cheltenham, then a rural area. In 1935 CHN bought the adjacent land to become their headquarters, designed in a Spanish Mission Style by the ecclesiastical architect Louis Williams and built as a memorial to Mother Esther. Other works included the Children's Homes in Brighton, opened in 1894, in Newcastle (1921-37) and Goulburn (1931-69). The last of these was taken over from Mother Mary Gloriana's Community of the Servants of the Holy Cross who had established it in 1929. They also ran a retreat house in Adelaide, taught at two church schools (St John's and St George's) in Melbourne (1907-25), and ran St Ives Private Hospital (1917-52) and St George's Public Hospital (1912-49), both in Kew.

In 1956 a number of the members of the Order of the Good Shepherd in Auckland joined CHN and were formally admitted in 1958. Some of those sisters then returned to New Zealand to continue to undertake their former work (as members of CHN) but. in 1970, CHN withdrew entirely from New Zealand and returned to Melbourne. From 1961 to 1962 Nicholas Allenby SSM (subsequently Bishop of Kuching) was warden.

Since the earliest ordination of women as priests in Melbourne in 1992 by Archbishop Keith Rayner, a number of sisters have been ordained, starting with Sister Margaret Anne in 1992. The most recent sister to join as a novice and then to profess was Sister Gloria, the widow of Bishop Owen Dowling.

In 2017 the sisters moved out of their community house, which then became a spirituality centre, and into an adjacent newly-built Esther House designed by Peter Vernon and named after the founder. The bell was cast by Anton Hasell and the aumbry and sanctuary light were designed by Rene Hempl. The chapel of the spirituality centre features a tapestry depicting the Creation by the artist Christopher Pyett which was installed in 1996.

The first male Anglican religious order in Australia was the Community of the Ascension, established in Goulburn in 1921; Louis Williams was also responsible for the design of the House of the Ascension. The Community of the Ascension had a large and striking outdoor crucifix, cast in bronze by the Belgian sculptor Aloïs de Beule, and located within the calvary garden. The crucifix was given as a memorial to Maurice Kelly, the CA's co-founder, who died in 1926. The CA dissipated over 1940 and 1941 and formally dissolved in 1943. On the closure of the House of Ascension, the community gave de Beule's crucifix to CHN which, at the time, ran a girls' home in Goulburn. The crucifix is now located in a calvary garden of CHN's community house.

== Community of the Visitation of Our Lady ==
In 1950, CHN was invited to open a mission in Dogura in the Diocese of New Guinea to run a school for girls, the Holy Name High School. The sisters arrived in 1951, shortly after the devastating eruption of Mount Lamington which killed many Anglican missionaries. Over time, a number of the former students requested admittance to CHN; as a result a local community, the Community of the Visitation of Our Lady, was established in 1964. The chapel had to be demolished in 2016 as it had become unsafe, but the community is extant.

== Sisters of the Incarnation ==
Two sisters left CHN in 1981 to form the community of the Sisters of the Incarnation in Adelaide. They first established themselves in Glenelg in 1982, then moved to Elizabeth in 1983, then 1994 to Golden Grove and 2003 to Dover Gardens. The sisters combine monastic and apostolic aspects of the religious life. In 1992 one of the two sisters, Sister Juliana, was one of the first women to be ordained a priest in Adelaide.

== Community of Christ the King ==
In 1974 three members of CHN, who wished to live an enclosed contemplative life rather than an active one, began to live such a life within the grounds of CHN's Cheltenham headquarters. From 1981 the three sisters lived in a separate home, called the House of Christ the King. In 1984 the sisters went to England to live with the enclosed contemplative Community of the Sisters of the Love of God in Fairacres, Oxford. On their return to Australia two years later they were joined by a further two CHN sisters, but still remaining part of CHN in Cheltenham. In 1988 the group was invited by the Diocese of Wangaratta to establish itself there. In 1989 they were offered a farm outside Wangaratta to which they moved the following year. In 1993 they separated from CHN and established themselves as the Community of Christ the King. The community is still formally extant, although there is only one remaining sister who lives in an old-age facility.

== Mothers superior ==
- Mother Esther, 1912-31.
- Mother Alice, 1931-34.
- Mother Ida, 1934-58
- Mother Flora, 1958-60.
- Mother Faith, 1960-81.
- Mother Elizabeth Gwen, 1981-94.
- Mother Valmai, 1994-2011.
- Mother Carol, 2011-.
