= St John's Theological College, Melbourne =

Australian Theological College

St John's Theological College, Melbourne was an Australian educational institution in Melbourne, established in 1906 and closed in 1919. It trained candidates for ordination in the Church of England in Australia.

== History ==
The college took over buildings formerly occupied by a private school, Cumloden College, located at 195-201 Alma Road, St Kilda East. The college opened in 1906. The future Bishop of Bathurst (1911–28) and Newcastle (1928-30), George Long was offered the position of warden on the establishment of the college, but declined. St John's had a focus on training non-graduates for ordination. The college was Anglo-Catholic and was closed in 1919 for churchmanship reasons in the Diocese of Melbourne, the evangelical Ridley College having opened in 1910. After the college closed, the buildings were sold and demolished.

In 1908, two students at St John's decided to form a religious community, the Association of the Divine Call, with three-year vows of celibacy. The two students were Maurice Richard Daustini Kelly and Gerard Kennedy Tucker. Tucker had previously studied for ordination at St Wilfrid's Theological College, Cressy. At the time (1906 to 1907), the warden of St Wilfred's was Nugent Kelly, the father of Maurice. Three other students joined. The establishment of the association received a lukewarm response from Archbishop Lowther Clarke and, after ordination to the diaconate in 1910, the members of the community went their own ways. Kelly became a member of the Community of the Ascension in Goulburn in 1921, but died just five years later. Tucker went on to found the Brotherhood of St Laurence in 1930 and the Food for Peace Campaign in 1953 (which eventually became Oxfam Australia).

The nearby Anglo-Catholic church, St James the Great, St Kilda East, began as a small community worshipping in the college chapel.

== Wardens ==
- Reginald Stephen, 1906–14. Concurrently Dean of Melbourne, 1910–14; Bishop of Tasmania, 1914–19; Bishop of Newcastle, 1919–28.
- James Roy Norman, 1908-09 (acting).
- John Stephen Hart, 1914–19. Dean of Melbourne, 1919–27; Bishop of Wangaratta, 1927–42.

== Notable alumni ==
- Martin Boyd, novelist, brother of Merric Boyd. Boyd did not proceed to ordination.
- Merric Boyd, artist, brother of Martin Boyd. Boyd did not proceed to ordination.
- Fr John Hope, Rector of Christ Church St Laurence, Sydney, 1926–64
- The Rt Revd William Johnson, Dean of Newcastle, 1928–36; Bishop of Ballarat, 1936–60.
- Fr Maurice Kelly, co-founder of the Community of the Ascension
- Fr Gerard Tucker, founder of the Brotherhood of St Laurence and the Food for Peace Campaign

== See also ==
- Australian College of Theology
- Moore Theological College
- Trinity College Theological School
