= Gerard Tucker =

Australian Anglican priest

Gerard Kennedy Tucker OBE (18 February 1885 – 24 May 1974, sometimes referred to as G. Kennedy Tucker, was an Anglican priest in Melbourne, Australia. Tucker founded the Brotherhood of St Laurence in 1930 and the forerunner of Oxfam Australia in 1953.

== Early life ==
Tucker was born in the vicarage of Christ Church, South Yarra, Melbourne, where his father (the Rev Horace Finn Tucker) was the vicar. He was educated at Melbourne Church of England Grammar School. From childhood he wanted to follow his father and grandfather as a priest. He worked briefly in a sugar factory and on a relation's farm, but his father finally agreed that he should study for the priesthood. In 1906 he entered St Wilfrid's Theological College, Cressy and in 1908 moved to St John's Theological College, Melbourne.

== Association of the Divine Call ==
In 1908, two students at St John's decided to form a religious community, the Association of the Divine Call, with three-year vows of celibacy. The two students were Maurice Richard Daustini Kelly and Tucker. Three other students joined. The establishment of the Association received a lukewarm response from Archbishop Lowther Clarke, and, after ordination to the diaconate in 1910, the members of the community went their own ways. Kelly became a member of the Community of the Ascension in Goulburn in 1921, but died just five years later.

== Clerical career ==
Having served as curate in Onslow in north-west Australia from 1910 to 1912, he was ordained as a priest in 1914, becoming curate of St George's, Malvern. On the outbreak of war he enlisted as a private soldier and sailed for the Middle East in December 1915. He was later appointed chaplain to the Australian Imperial Force, serving in Egypt and France until he was invalided back to Australia in 1917. In 1919 he published As Private and Padre with the A.I.F.

After a brief period as assistant chaplain to the Missions to Seamen in Melbourne (1919-20), Tucker was invited to Newcastle, New South Wales by the bishop, Reginald Stephen, whose second wife was Tucker's sister Elsie. Stephen had also been the warden of St John's College in Melbourne when Tucker was training for ordination there. In 1920 Tucker was appointed to St Stephen's, Adamstown, a parish near Newcastle, where he met Guy Colman Cox who shared his dream of a community of serving priests. In 1930 they founded the Brotherhood of St Laurence. Its four original members pledged to remain unmarried while part of the brotherhood, to live frugally and to practise an active community life. Tucker remained at Adamstown until 1933.

He was appointed as missioner to St Mary's Mission within the parish of St Peter's, Eastern Hill in Melbourne - both he and Guy Cox were licensed as curates in the same parish (1933). In 1939 Tucker recruited the pacifist and social activist (and future Chairman of the Australian Board of Missions and Archbishop-elect of Brisbane) Frank Coaldrake to the Brotherhood of St Laurence to work in the inner-Melbourne suburb of Fitzroy as a community worker.

== Food for Peace and Community Aid Abroad ==
Tucker moved in 1949 to Carrum Downs where he soon embarked on his new project, Food for Peace. He encouraged residents at the settlement to contribute from their pensions to send a shipment of rice to India. Supporting groups formed throughout Australia and in 1961, as Community Aid Abroad, they became a national organization. Tucker published pamphlets in support of the project and, in 1954, an autobiography, Thanks Be.

== Personal life ==
Tucker was honoured with an OBE in 1956. He retired to St Laurence Park at Lara, Victoria in 1959. He moved into its first cottage where he remained until his death and was buried in the Melbourne General Cemetery. A biography by John Handfield was published in 1981.

Tucker is reported to have been a member of the Eugenics Society of Victoria.

Dr Cecil Finn Tucker (1876–1945), who had practices at Beeac and Preston and responsibilities at Mont Park Hospital, was a brother. He was a published playwright (Pleston's Experiment (1929), Butterflies and Bees (1932), The Optimist (1934), Thunder and Death (1936)), also author of short stories and a book of golfing fiction. He was father of two medicos: Dr Horace Tucker and Dr John Tucker.
