= Clergy Training College, Goulburn =

Former Anglican theological college in Australia

The Clergy Training College (also known as the Goulburn Diocesan College) was a short-lived Australian educational institution in Goulburn, New South Wales, established in 1906. It trained candidates for ordination in the Anglican Church of Australia (which, at the time, was called the Church of England in Australia).

The Rt Rev Christopher Barlow (1858-1915) was Bishop of Goulburn from 1902 to 1915. Barlow was strongly opposed to 'party', and considered that the needs of a bush diocese required a broad theological training. It was also the era of many of the Australian dioceses establishing their own theological colleges. In 1906 Barlow established the Clergy Training College. The first Warden was the Rev Wentworth Wentworth-Sheilds, formerly the Archdeacon of Wagga. Barlow and Wentworth-Sheilds were cousins.

By 1907 there were seven students, with a further 10 accepted for admission. Those seven were in a rented house, but Barlow's intention was to erect a permanent building next to St Saviour's Cathedral.

It is unclear exactly when the college closed. Fundraising was still taking place at the end of 1908, but there is no apparent press coverage after that. Wentworth-Sheilds (later the Bishop of Armidale from 1916 to 1929) became Rector of St James' Church, Sydney in 1910, and there is no indication of a successor having been appointed as warden. Barlow died in 1915, shortly after retiring as Bishop, and left £1,000 to the diocese for clergy training, but not, specifically, to the college. It is implicit that it had closed by 1921, for in that year St John's College, Armidale was proposed to be the theological college for the country dioceses of New South Wales; in the previous year it had already been described publicly in such terms. It must have closed by 1918, as in that year Barlow's successor Lewis Radford offered Bishopthorpe to the founders of the Community of the Ascension, with one of the aims being to establish a theological college along the lines of Mirfield or Kelham, although, in fact, nothing came of this particular proposal.

The later St Mark's National Theological Centre in Canberra, within the renamed Diocese of Canberra & Goulburn, which was established by Barlow's successor, the Rt Rev Ernest Burgmann, in 1957, is unrelated to the 1906 college.
