= Campo Santo, Ghent =

Cemetery in Sint-Amandsberg, Ghent, Belgium

Coordinates: 51.0645°N 3.7498°E

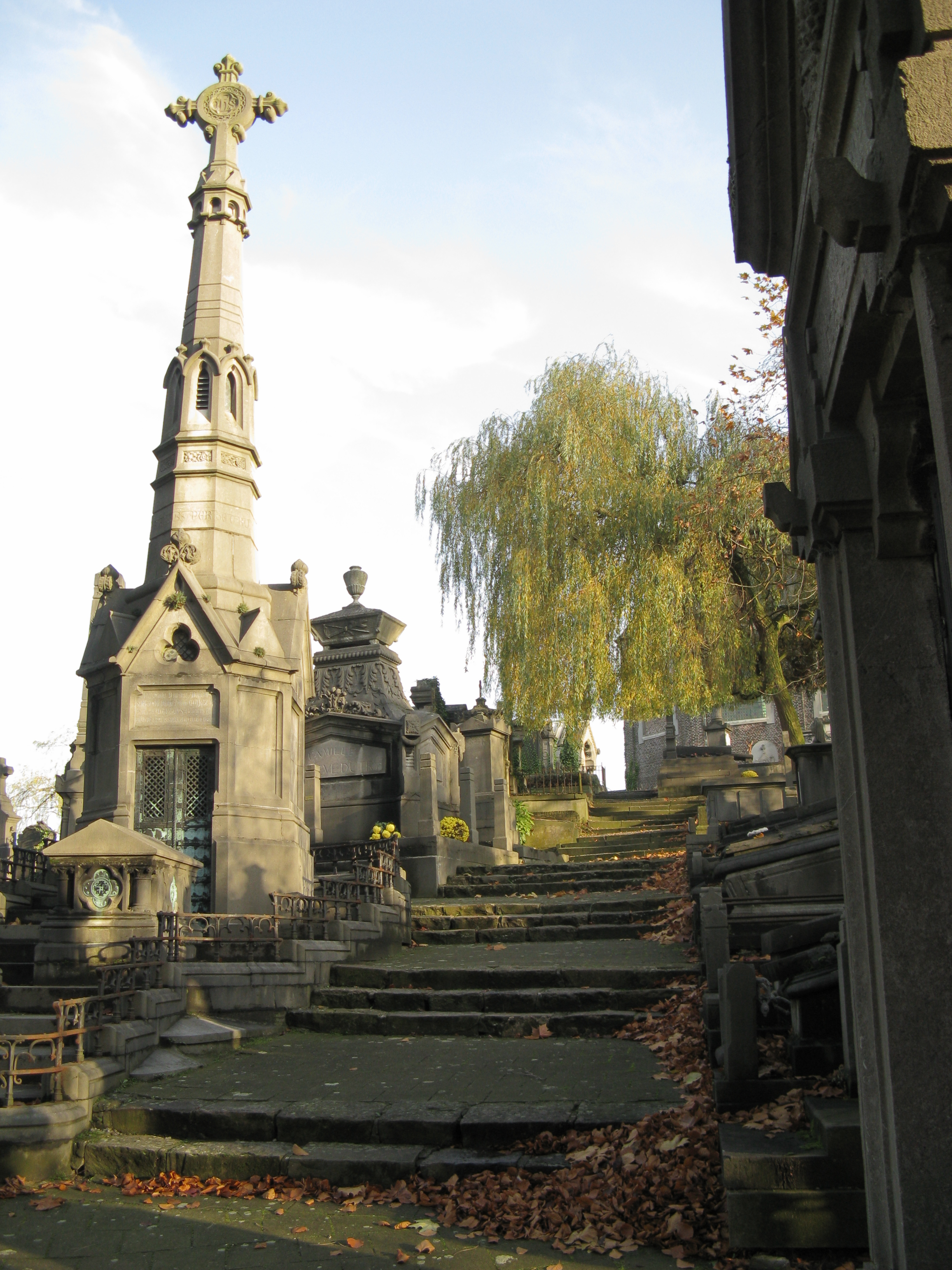
Hill with graves

The Campo Santo of Ghent, Belgium, is a famous Roman Catholic public burial ground in Sint-Amandsberg. The Campo Santo has been declared a historical monument by the government. This cemetery is located in the district of Dampoort.

== History ==
On top of a hill of 19 meter, bishop Philips Erard van der Noot erected in 1720 a late Baroque chapel in honour of Saint Amandus.

The inspiration for the establishment of the cemetery on the hill came from Paris's largest cemetery, Père Lachaise. It takes its name from the Campo Santo dei Teutonici e dei Fiamminghi ("Cemetery of the German and Flemings"), a burial site in Rome adjacent to the St. Peter's Basilica. The cemetery was opened on 8 December 1847 by Fr Jozef van Damme, the local parish priest. One of the first burials was that of Countess Marie de Hemptinne.

The Roman Catholic bourgeoisie of Ghent favoured this place as their place of burial and almost all great Catholic families of Ghent are buried here. In addition, well-known liberals, politicians, writers, painters and composers were also given a final resting place at the cemetery.

== Famous burials ==
- Christine D'haen, poet and author
- Filip De Pillecyn, man of letters
- Jules de Saint-Genois (Jules Ludger, Baron de Saint-Genois des Mottes), archivist, writer and historian
- Luc De Vos, musician, author and Ghent folk hero
- Jan Grauls
- Joseph Guislain, psychiatrist
- Corneille Heymans
- Jan Hoet
- Karel Lodewijk Ledeganck
- Wilfried Martens
- Polydore Martou and Hortensia Modlinski, brewer, family monument by Geo Verbanck
- Frans Masereel, sculptor
- Louis Minard, builder
- Lodewijk Roelandt
- Marc Sleen, cartoonist
- Leo Vindevogel
- Gustave van de Woestijne, artist
- Karel van de Woestijne, author

Not only are some of those who are buried here noteworthy, but also some of the gravestones are the works of famous sculptors or craftsmen such as Jozef Geefs, Aloïs de Beule and Geo Verbanck. The Campo is thus also well known for its funerary heritage and architecture. 131 graves are protected and listed as valuable.
