= Dampoort =

Dampoort may refer to:

- Dampoort, Bruges, a former city gate complex in Bruges
- Dampoort, Ghent, a neighbourhood and former city gate in Ghent
  - Gent-Dampoort railway station, a railway station located in railway, Ghent
- Dampoort, Middelburg, a former city gate in Middelburg
