= Emma Caroline Silcock =

Community worker and Anglican religious sister

- Born: 26 May 1858; Stalham, Norfolk, England
- Died: 11 September 1931 (aged 73); Melbourne, Victoria, Australia
- Other names: Sister Esther
- Occupations: Community worker; Religious sister

Emma Caroline Silcock (1858–1931) was an Australian Anglican religious sister and community worker, better known as Sister (later Mother) Esther. She founded the Community of the Holy Name in Cheltenham, Victoria and led The Mission to the Streets and Lanes of Melbourne, ministering to those living in the city's slums.

== Biography ==
Emma Caroline Silcock was born on 26 May 1858 in Stalham, Norfolk, England. She was the eldest child of shopkeeper Thomas Silcock, and his wife Sarah Elizabeth, née Barber.

She entered the Anglican Community of St Mary the Virgin in Wantage in 1884, where she became known as Sister Esther. Following an injury while still a novice, she came to Australia to recuperate. Not long after arriving in Melbourne she became the leader of the Mission to the Streets and Lanes, a Church of England organisation that had been initiated by Bishop James Moorhouse in 1885. Sister Esther moved into the mission's house in Little Lonsdale Street, Melbourne, and gathered a group of women around her to assist with the work, forming the foundations of a permanent religious community. In 1912 this was formalized when Archbishop Henry Lowther Clarke provided them with a charter as the Community of the Holy Name.

Under the leadership of Sister Esther the Community grew, offering an expanding range of services, and extending its geographic reach. The Community conducted schools, children's homes and hospitals in Melbourne and managed additional homes in the Anglican Diocese of Newcastle (Australia). The Community established a House of Mercy for fallen girls in Cheltenham in 1892 and a Home for Neglected Children at Brighton in 1894. By the end of Mother Esther's life, the Community comprised twenty-five professed sisters and six novices staffing nine houses in both Victoria and New South Wales.

Sister Esther died in Melbourne on 11 September 1931 after a brief illness, and was buried in Cheltenham Pioneer Cemetery.

== Legacy ==
The Community of the Holy Name was established under the leadership of Sister Esther. She was also the first manager of the Mission to the Streets and Lanes, which operated in inner city Melbourne from 1885. Her legacy has proved to be a lasting one. The Mission eventually went on to became Anglicare, the national umbrella body for community services agencies associated with the Anglican Church of Australia. The Anglican sisters from the Community of the Holy Name have continued to live, pray and minister in Melbourne for more than 125 years.
