= Geo Verbanck =

Belgian sculptor and medalist

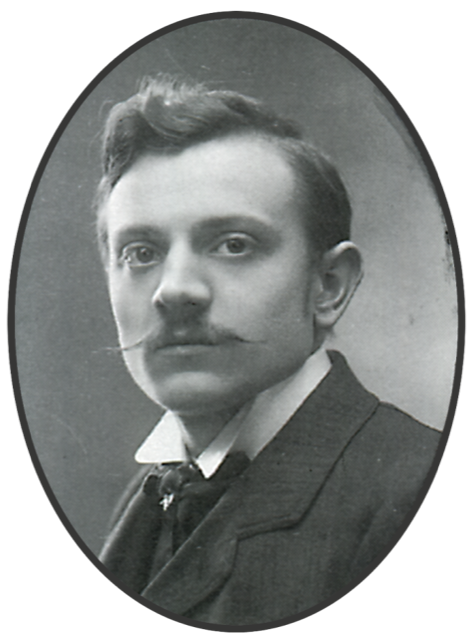
- Geo Verbanck 1910
- Born: George Leopold Verbanck; 28 February 1881; Ghent, Belgium
- Died: 12 December 1961 (aged 80); Aartselaar, Belgium
- Education: Royal Academy of Fine Arts, Ghent, Royal Academy of Fine Arts, Brussels (Belgium)
- Known for: Sculptor, medalist
- Style: figurative art
- Movement: symbolism, Art Nouveau, Art Deco, realism

Geo (Georges) Verbanck (28 February 1881 – 12 December 1961) was a Belgian sculptor and medalist.

== Early life ==
Born in the city of Ghent (Flanders), Belgium, Verbanck spent his childhood in the care of a foster family at the countryside in Laarne. At the age of 14, he moved back to Ghent as he had to make a living.

He was appointed as an apprentice in the studio of Petrus Pauwels-D’Hondt, a sculptor and art-cabinetmaker who specialized in period pieces and church furniture. Here he acquired the first techniques of fine art wood carving.

In 1896, Verbanck moved to another workplace, this time of the renowned sculptor Aloïs de Beule, who ran a studio which produced a broad range of artwork such as crucifixes, Stations of the Cross, allegorical statues, steles and busts.

Not only Geo Verbanck, but also his fellow apprentices Leon Sarteel and Oscar Sinia, acquired in this studio the skills of making artwork using different materials. Their craftsmanship allowed them to become esteemed sculptors afterwards.

De Beule advised Verbanck to enroll in the Royal Academy of Fine Arts in Ghent, where he attended from 1898 until 1904. Amongst his teachers were Jean Delvin who was well known for his history of art courses, and Louis Van Biesbroeck, who taught him how to sculpt art models. From 1905 till 1906, he attended classes by Charles van der Stappen at the Royal Academy of Fine Arts, Brussels. His teachers influenced his artistic development in becoming a sculptor with a distinctive classical style.

== Career ==
In 1909, he participated in the "Prize of Rome", the national Belgian contest for young sculptors. After excelling in the three preliminary assignments, he was awarded the second prize in the final assignment for his statue Orpheus.

Verbanck became more noted by participating in exhibitions and salons in his home country and abroad.

In 1912, he was officially commissioned to design the Monument in honour of the Van Eyck brothers Hubert and Jan in Ghent, together with the architect Valentin Vaerwyck, who was in charge of the architectural part. The brothers Van Eyck were the medieval painters of the Ghent altarpiece Adoration of the Mystic Lamb .With great interest, the internationally financed monument was inaugurated by King Albert on 9 August 1913 at the World's Fair. It was highly esteemed by the public, and was Verbanck's final breakthrough as an artist.

Geo Verbanck was awarded numerous public commissions that included monuments, war memorials and decorations for buildings. His private commissions consisted mainly of funeral monuments, portrait busts and medallions and medals. In his free works of art the emotions of women and children, and the family as a whole, were his favorite themes.

Throughout his career Verbanck shared his technical knowledge and artistic vision with others. From 1911 until 1927, he taught at the Royal Academy of Fine Arts in Dendermonde. In 1924 he was also appointed professor at the Royal Academy of Fine Arts in Ghent where he taught until his retirement in 1941. His work was also part of the sculpture event in the art competition at the 1928 Summer Olympics. From 1935 to 1937, he also assumed the interim management of the academy.

Many artists had the opportunity to develop their sculpting skills in his atelier in Ghent.

When he retired in 1941, Verbanck was awarded the Belgian state prize "Great prize of plastic arts" for his entire oeuvre.

Verbanck remained active as a sculptor until his death in 1961.

== Style ==
Verbanck is considered one of the last classical sculptors in Belgium. Thanks to his broad crafts education he thoroughly mastered working with all kinds of materials:bronze, bluestone, marble, Euville (limestone), ivory and various types of wood. His education at the academies in Ghent and Brussels allowed him to develop his own delicate figurative language in which a classical purity, harmony and intuitive feeling of the right dimension prevailed. While his work was originally influenced by the curved lines of Art Nouveau, during the interwar period it would gradually evolve into a more linear and angular Art Deco expression. After the Second World War, his work continued to evolve towards a softer round design.

== Selection of important works ==
=== Monuments ===
- Monument in honour of the Van Eyck brothers (1912) – Ghent, Geraard de Duivelhof.
- Frieze Justice – with Themis – (1955–1961) – Ghent, old courthouse)

=== War memorials ===
The following were his war memorial commissions.

- Dendermonde (1923), WW1, Heldenplein
- Grimde (1928), WW1, Necropolis Sint-Pieterskerk
- Lebbeke (1921), WW1, Grote Plaats s/n
- Lotenhulle (1921), WW1, Heilige Kruiskerk
- Moerbeke (1920), WW1, Bevrijdersstraat
- Roeselare (1945), WW2, O-L-Vrouwmarkt
- Ronse (1952), WW2, A. Depoortereplein

In Ghent, Verbanck realized five memorials after World War I in 1920 (3), 1922, 1923, and one after World War II in 1955.

=== Building decoration ===
Verbanck believed in the harmonious complementarity between sculpture and architecture. He was a member of the art association "l'Art Monumental" and other societies.

Leading architects, e.g. Valentin Vaerwyck collaborated with Verbanck to integrate sculpture in the buildings they designed.

- Old postal building (1912), Ghent, Korenmarkt, 5 sculptures representing the 5 continents
- Residence architect Valentin Vaerwyck, (1918), Ghent, Kortrijksesteenweg, portal
- Courthouse (1920–1924), Dendermonde, outside and inside bas-reliefs, portal children's court
- Bank van de Arbeid (1922), Ghent – Voldersstraat, low reliefs and sculpture groups
- Centenary Palace, (1935), Laken-Brussels, statue "The arts”
- House of the province, (1957), Ghent, Gouvernemenstraat, portal and bas-reliefs

=== Funeral monuments ===
Verbanck had a solid reputation for the design of funeral monuments. He covered the whole range of portrait medallions, busts, bas-reliefs and statues. Verbanck's work can be found in Ghent (4 cemeteries, of which the Campo Santo) and the cemeteries of Lokeren, Moerbeke, Elsene and Laken.

=== Portrait busts and medallions ===
Verbanck was a well-known portraitist. In many busts, medallions and plaques he achieved an intense expressivity with a refined psychological dimension. He made portraits of Cyriel Buysse, Jozef De Coene, Jozef Horenbant, Valentin Vaerwyck and Gustave Magnel. The catalogue of 2018 counts up to 135 people being portrayed by Geo Verbanck.

=== Applied arts ===
One of the Verbanck's first assignments at the Academy of Ghent was teaching the decorative arts curriculum. He designed amongst others challenge cups in silver, jewellery/memory boxes in wood, little wooden clocks, bookends in sandstone and a bronze radiator cap for luxury cars.

There also was a remarkable collaboration during the interwar period with the Kortrijkse Kunstwerkstede Gebroeders De Coene, a furniture and interior design company, for whom he designed a number of bronze decorative objects such as furniture decoration, door plates and interior decoration.

=== Medals, emergency coins ===
The Geo Verbanck medal catalogue contains 34 art medals. The influence of Art Nouveau and Art Deco is clearly visible in the medals. He also designed 3 emergency coins for the city of Ghent during WW1.

== Literature ==
- Geo Verbanck, "De techniek in de beeldhouwkunst", Brussel, Mededelingen van de Koninklijke Vlaamse Academie voor Wetenschappen, Letteren en Schone Kunsten van België, 1949
- Anthony Demey, "Geo Verbanck, beeldhouwer", Gent, Kleine Cultuurgids Provincie Oost-Vlaanderen, 1995 (digital version), Dutch official monography
- Engelen & Marx, "La sculpture en Belgique à partir de 1830", Louvain, 2006, 4344 pages, volume VII, p. 3949-3957
- Karel Verbanck, "Geo Verbanck, mijn vader", Oostende, private publication, 2015
- Anthony Demey, "De Orpheus van Geo Verbanck", Sint-Niklaas, Geo Verbanck foundation, 2015
- Anthony Demey, "Geo Verbanck – Medailles/medals", Sint-Niklaas, Geo Verbanck foundation, 2016
- Anthony Demey, "De oorlogsmonumenten van Geo Verbanck", Sint-Niklaas, Geo Verbanck foundation, 2018

== Photo Gallery ==
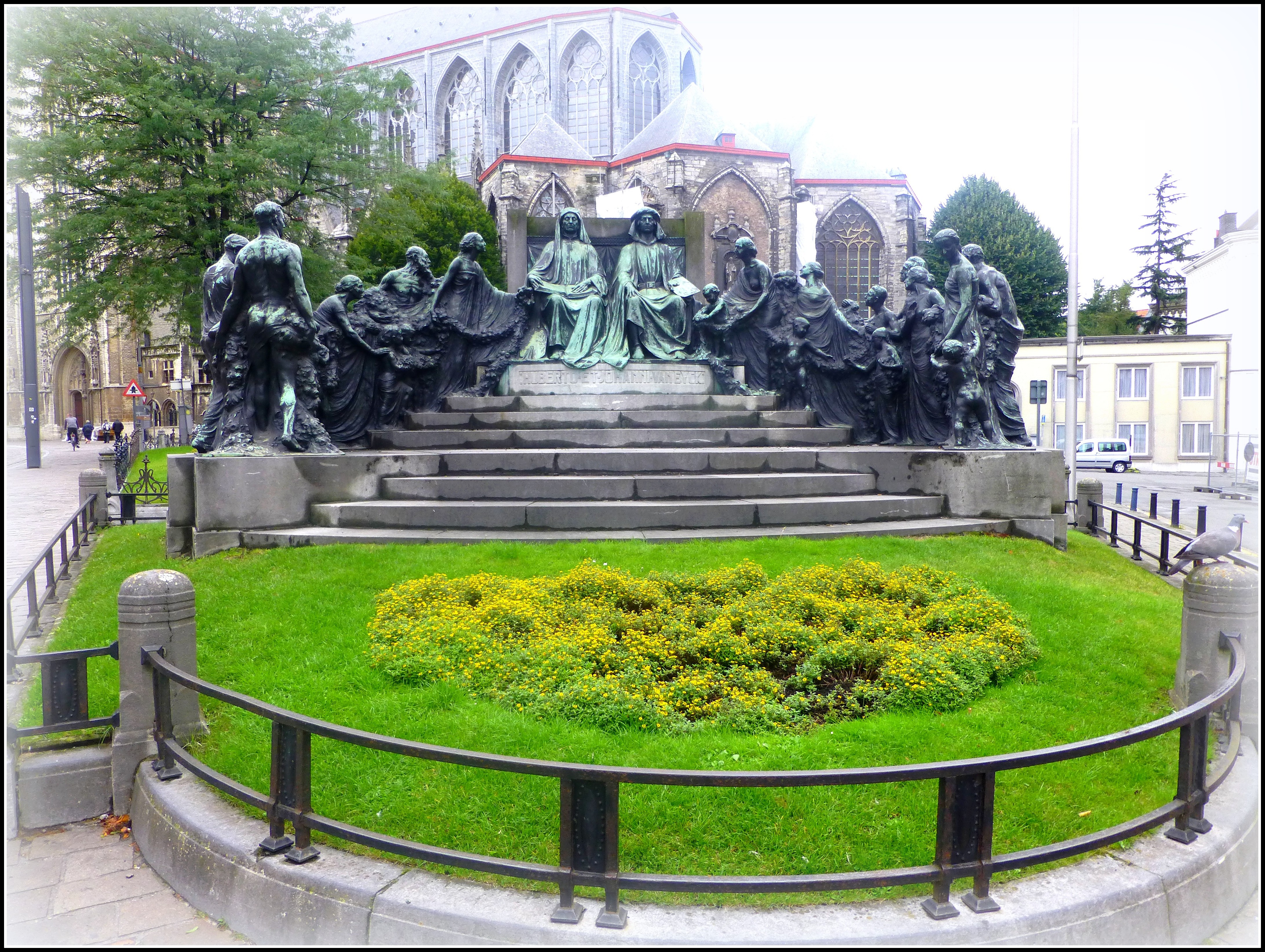
Monument in honour of the Van Eyck brothers Ghent

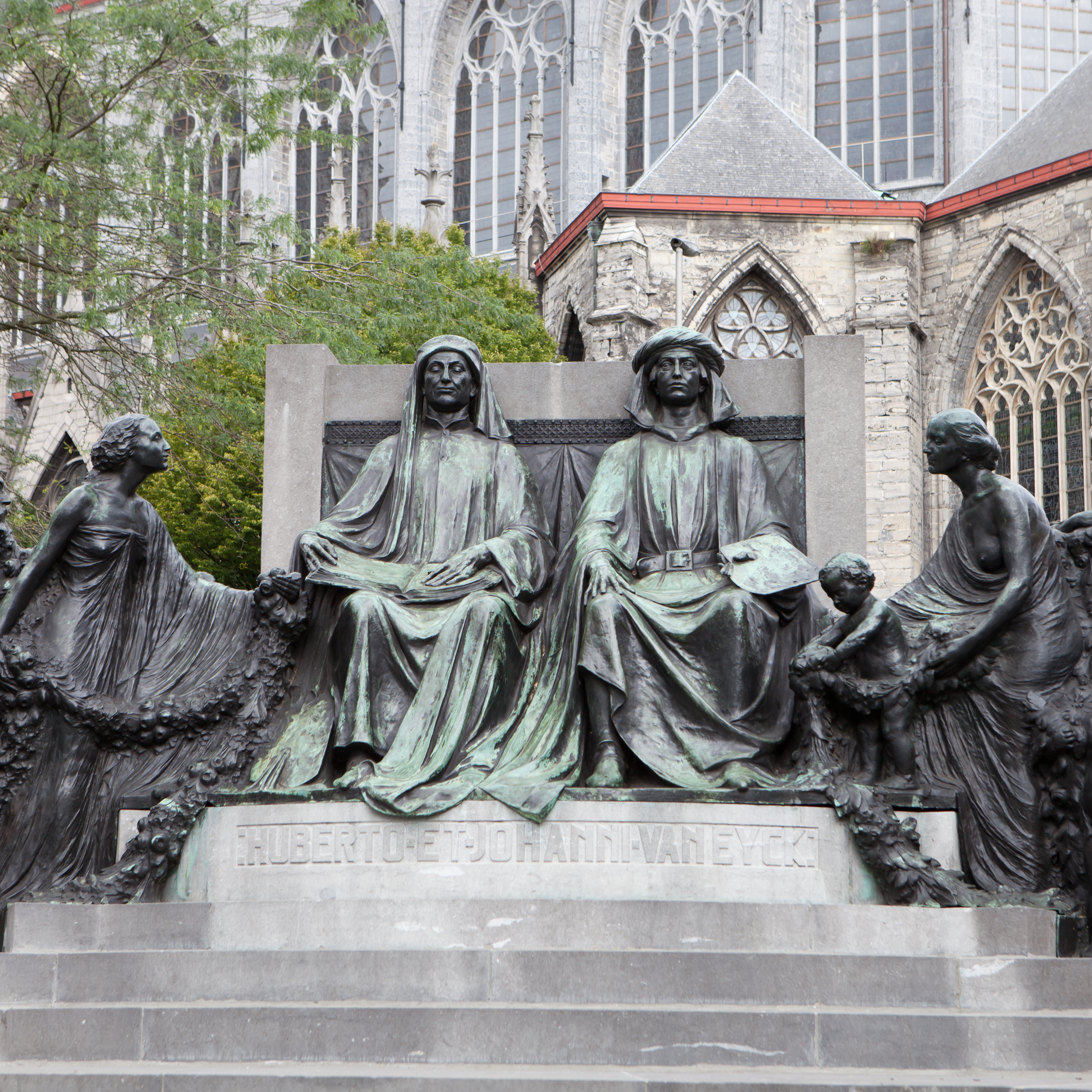
Monument in honour of the Van Eyck brothers Ghent

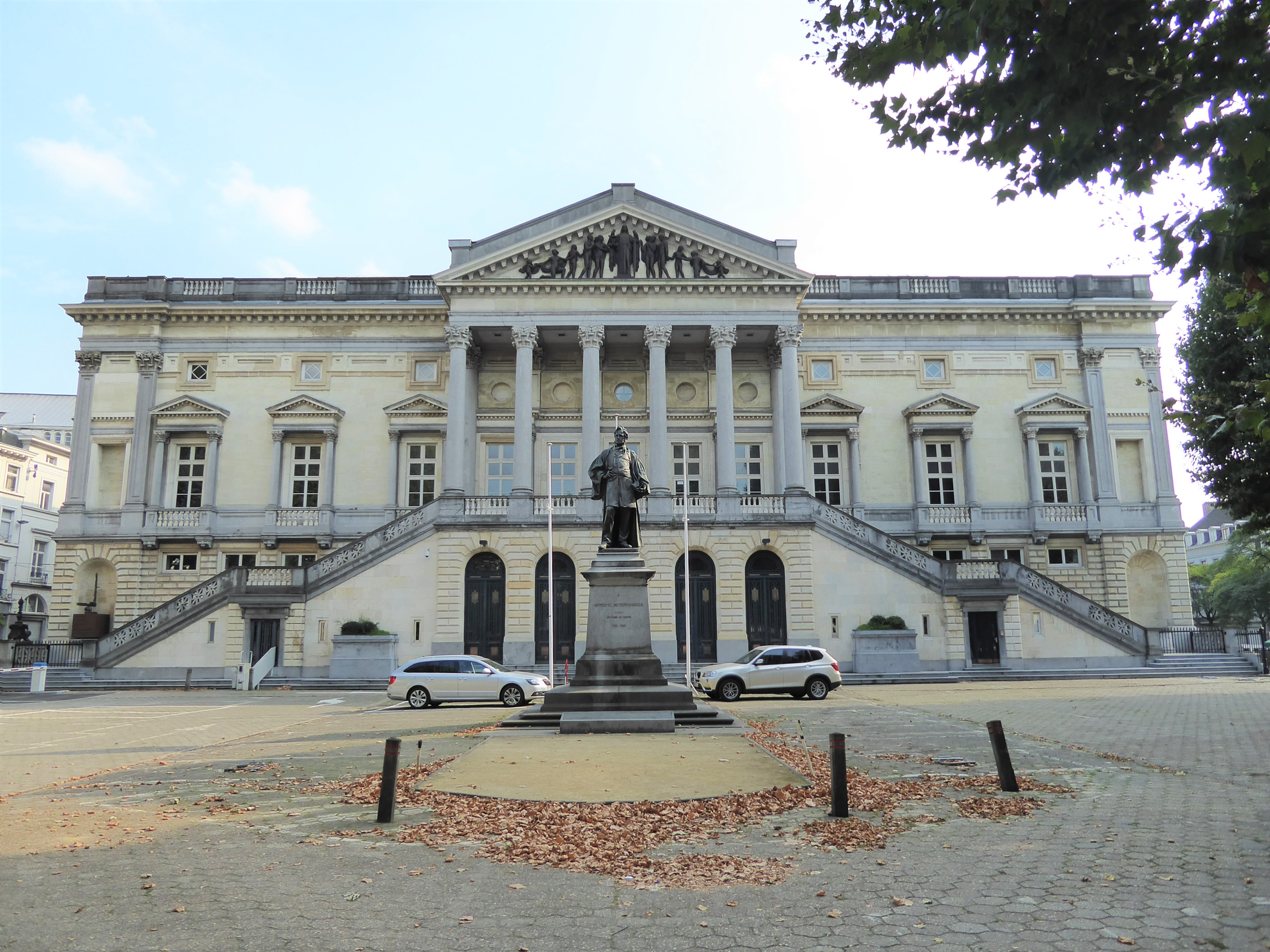
Old courthouse Ghent

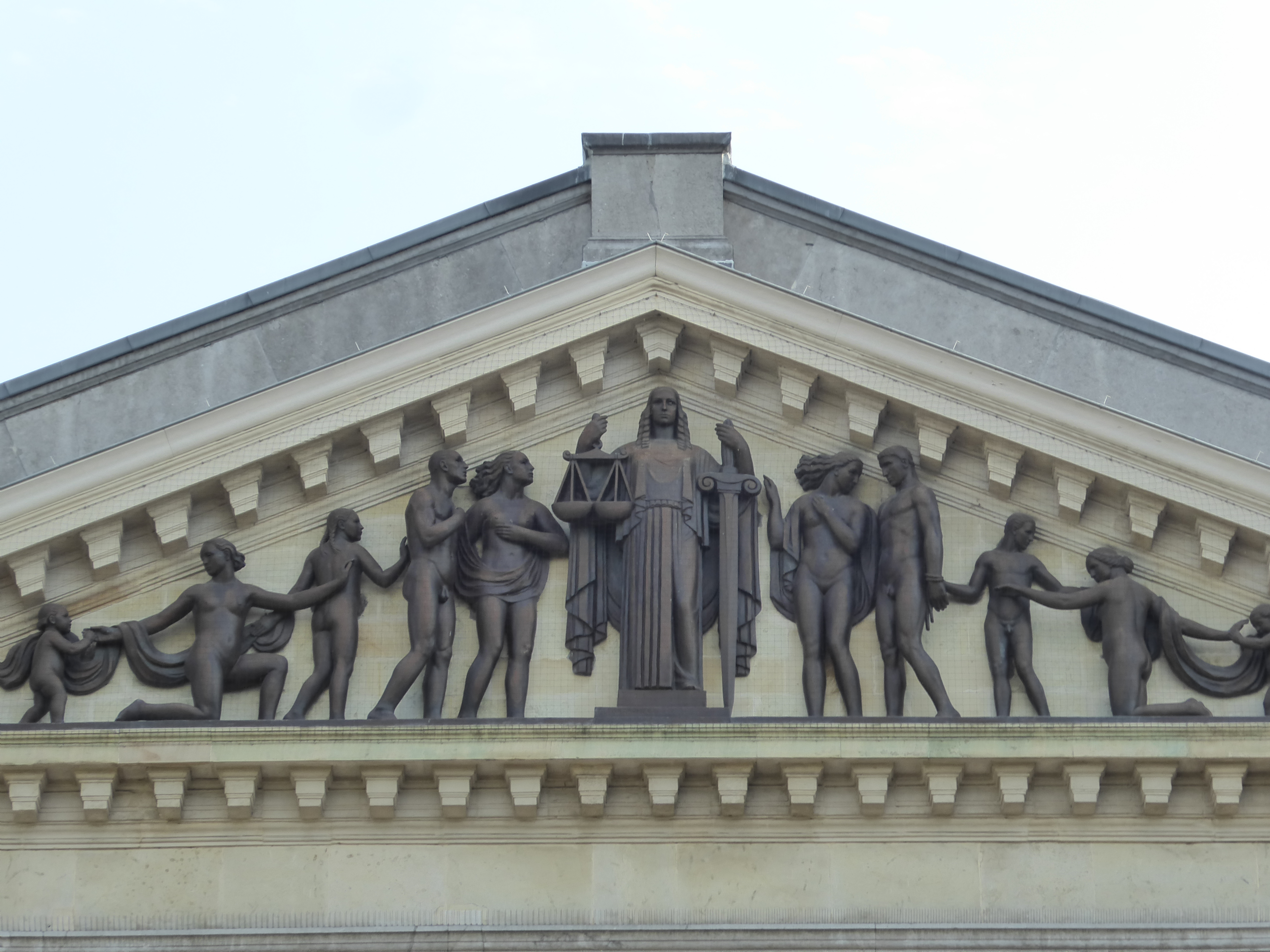
Frieze "Justice" Old courthouse Ghent

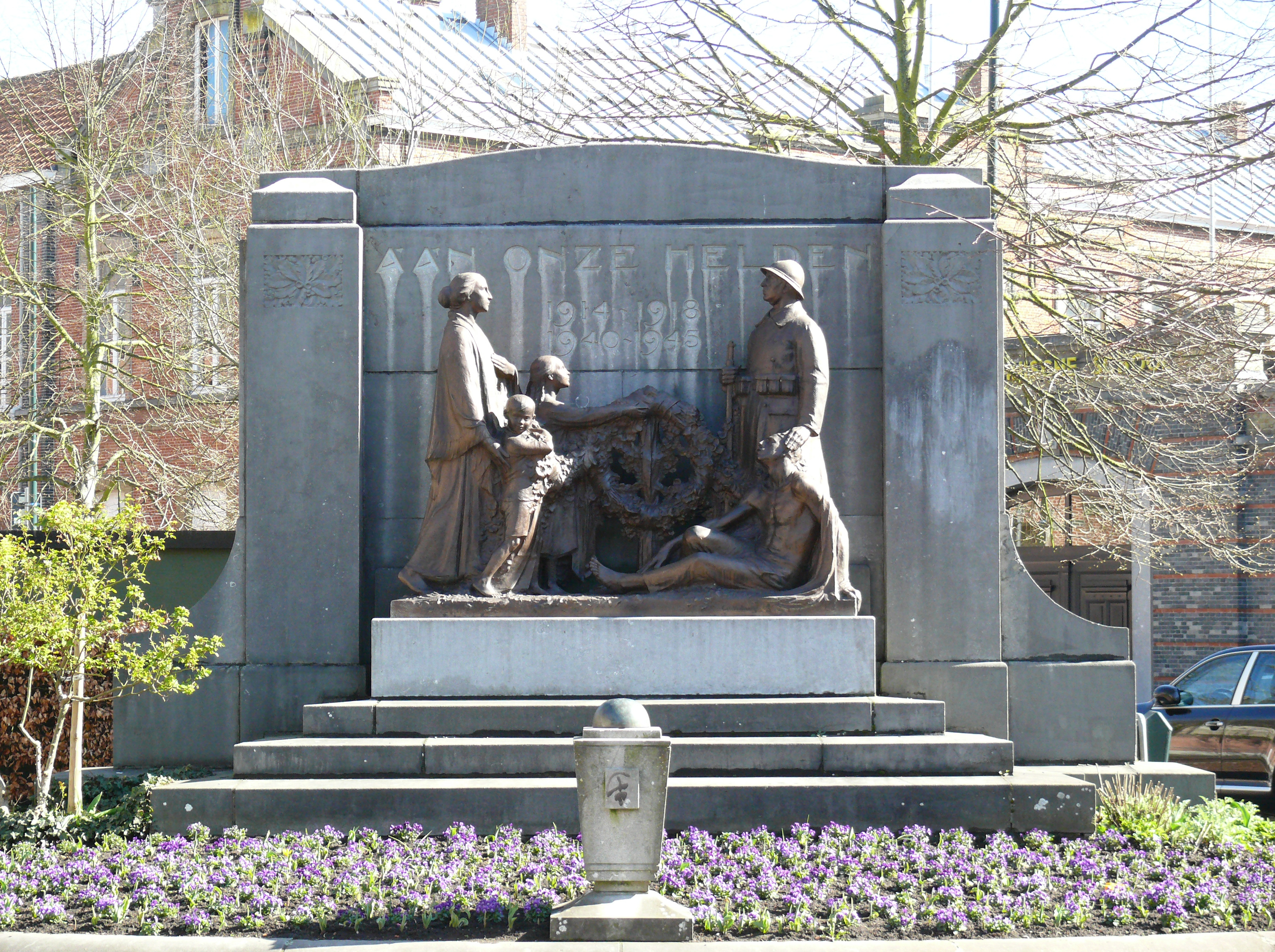
War memorial Dendermonde

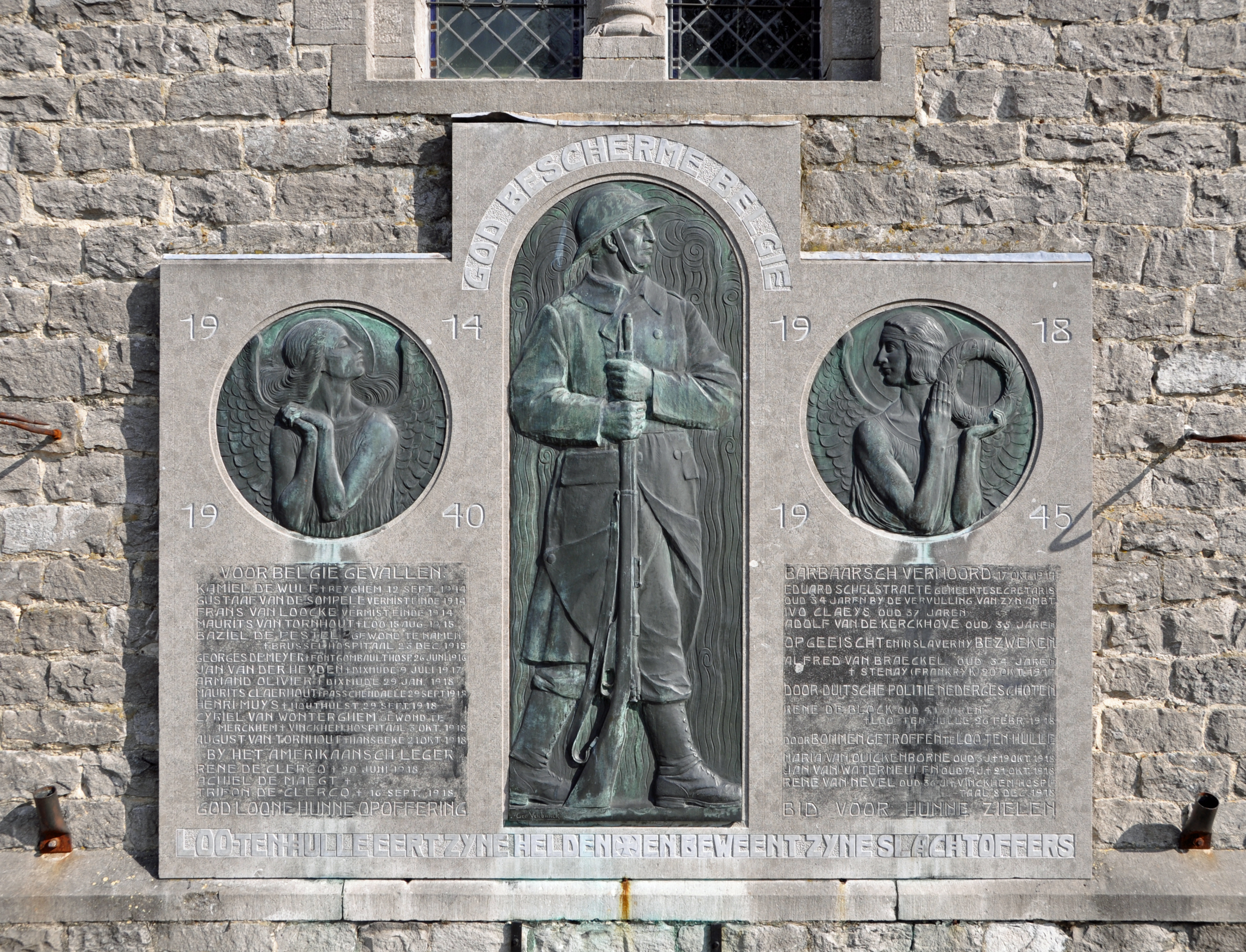
War memorial Lotenhulle

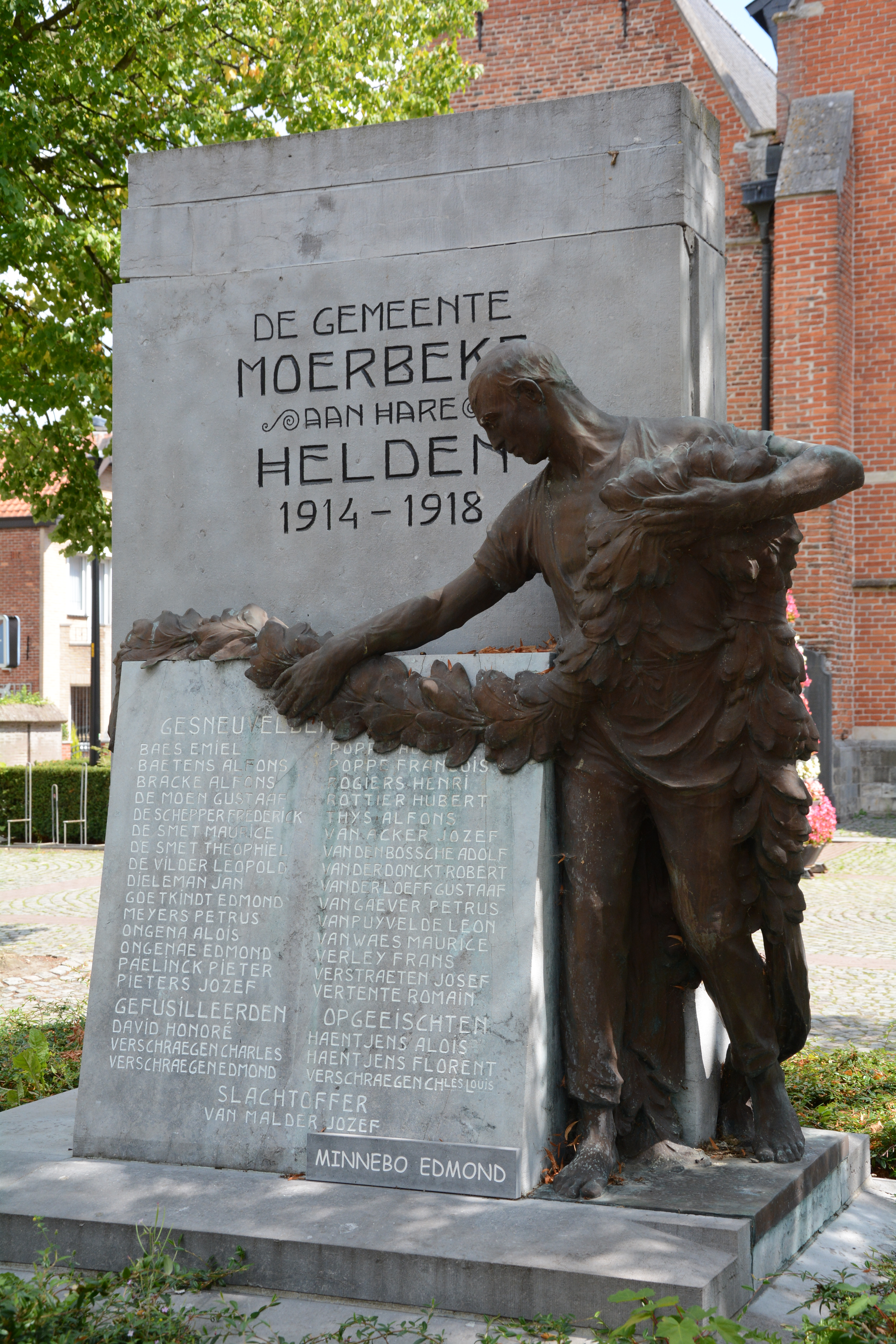
War memorial Moerbeke

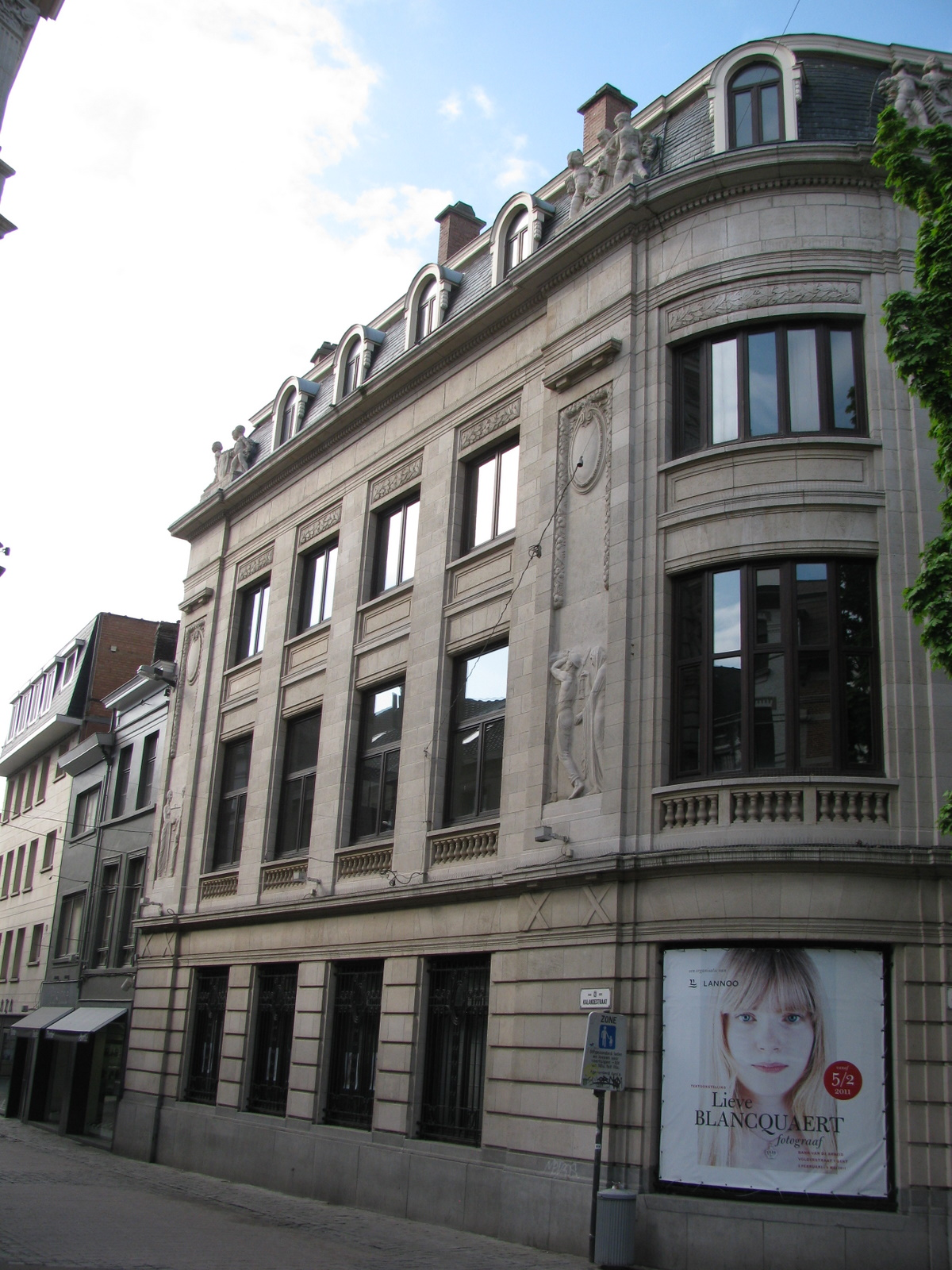
Bank van de Arbeid Ghent

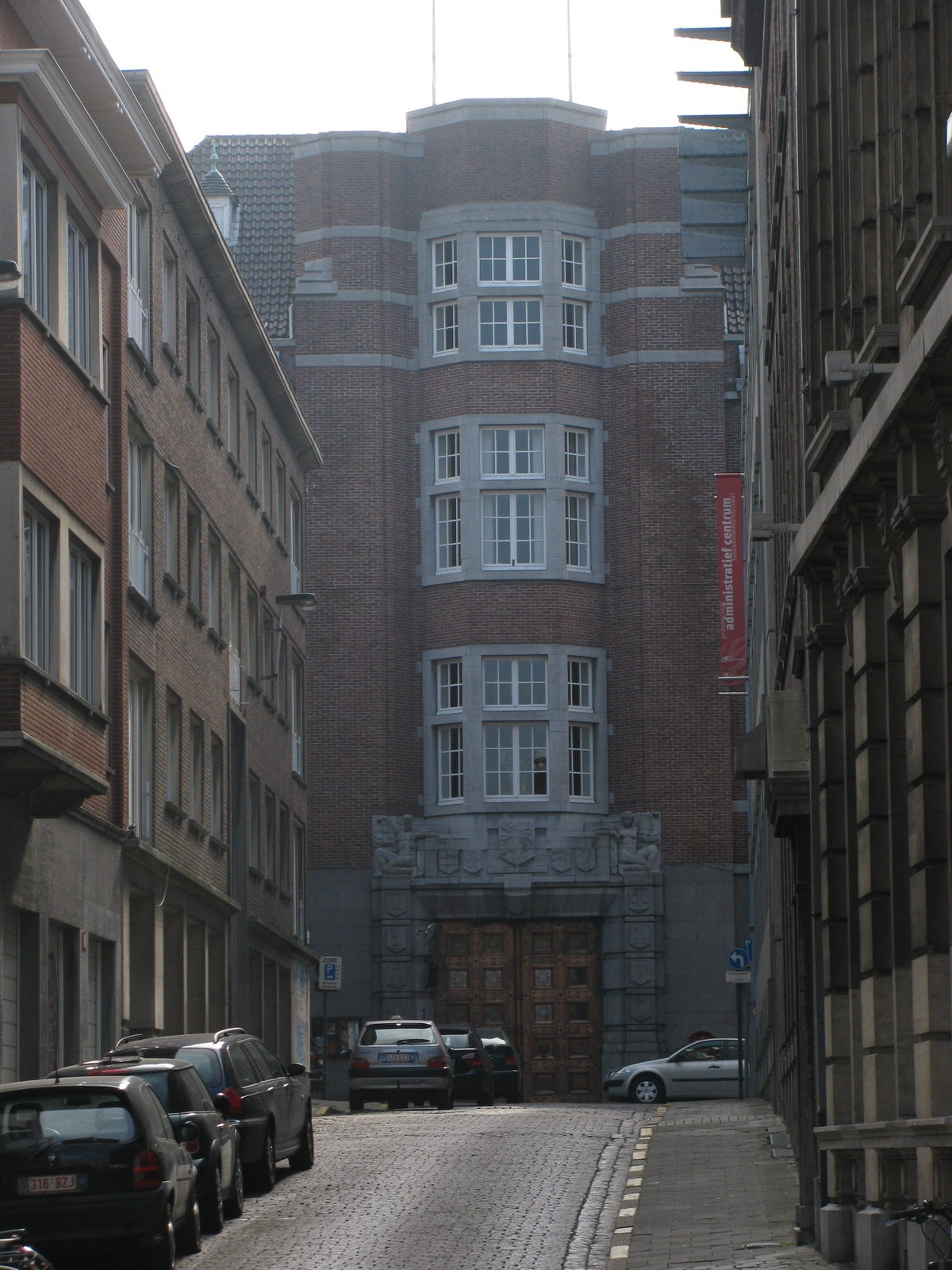
Portal House of the province Ghent

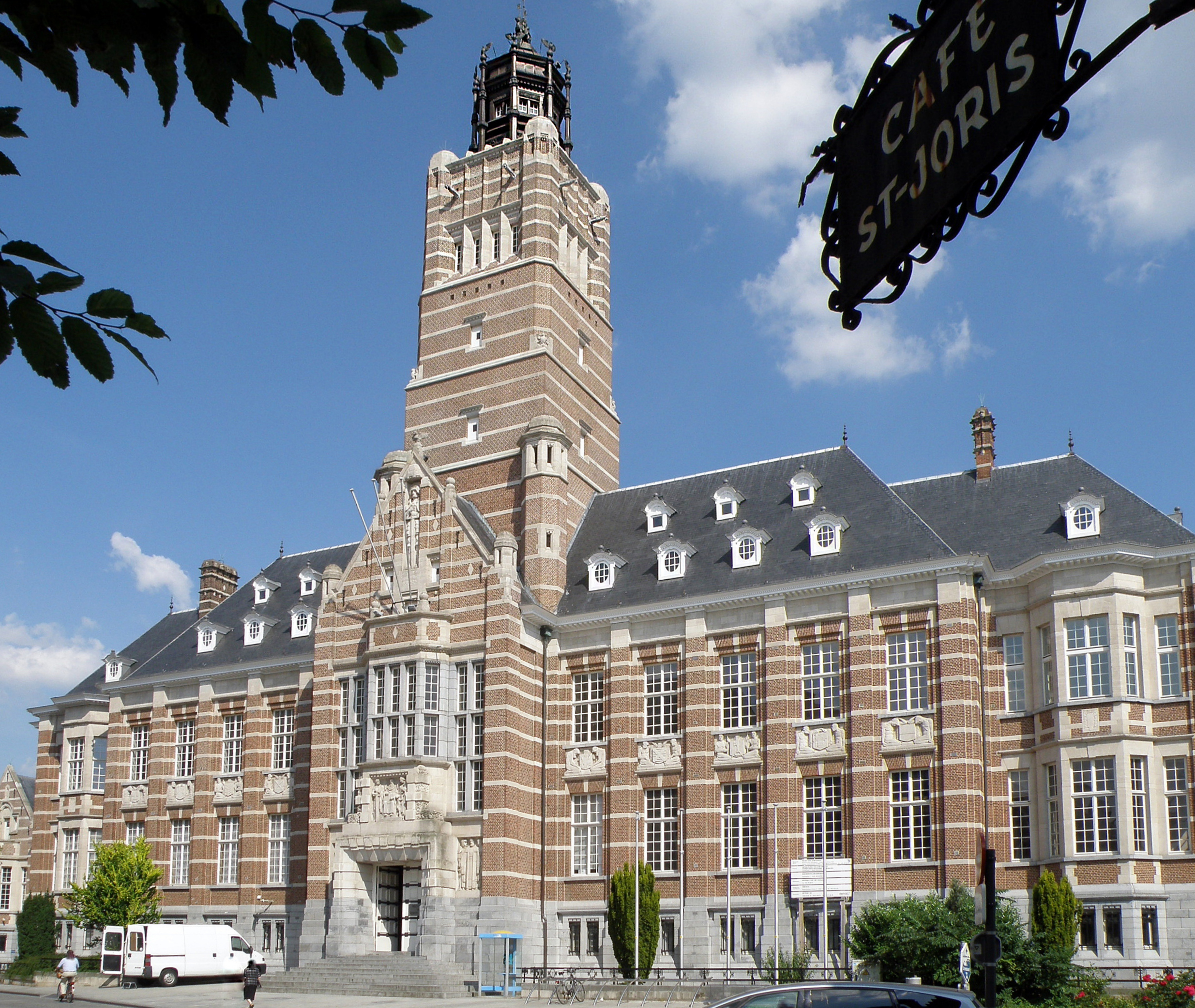
Courthouse Dendermonde

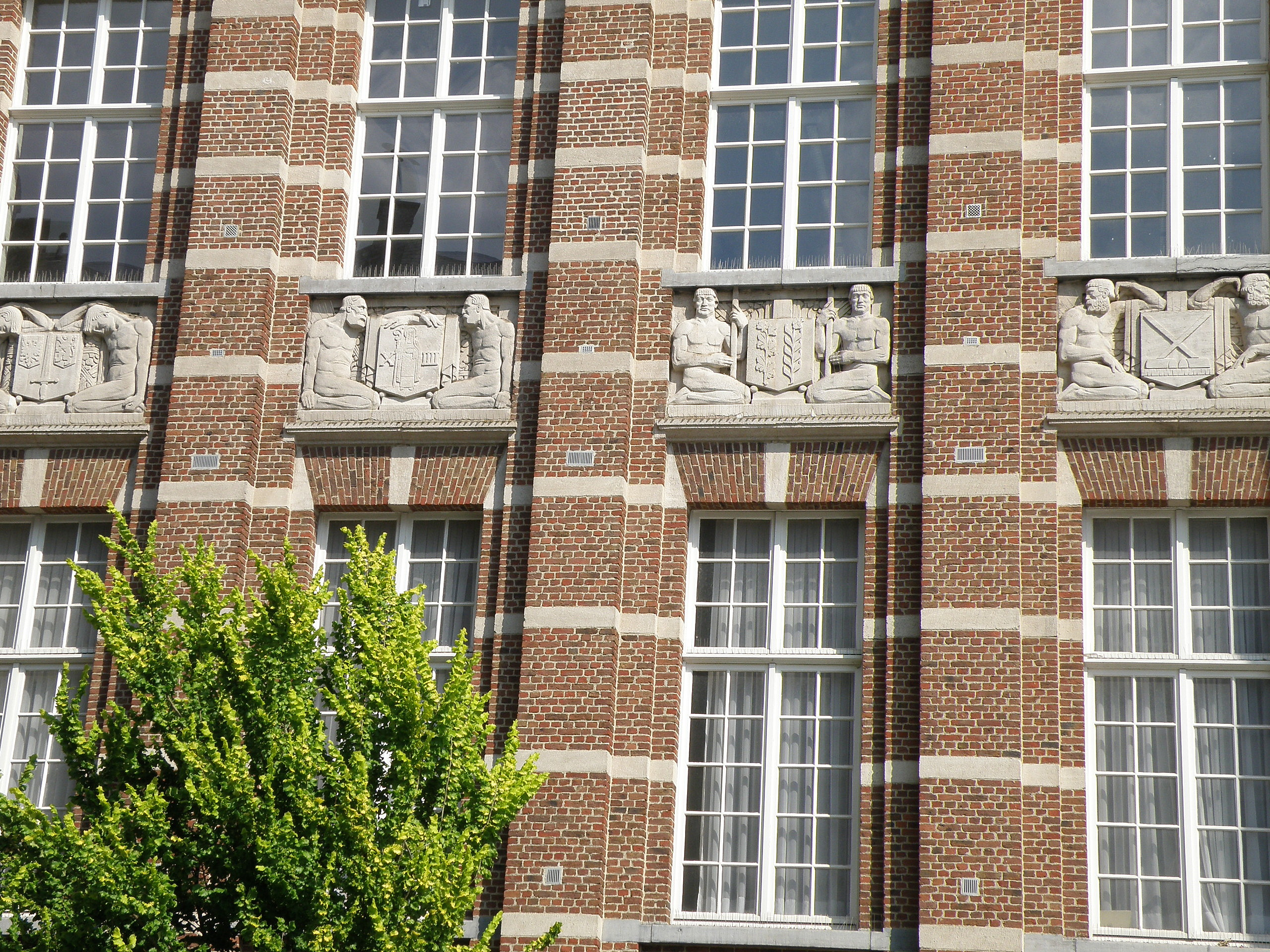
Courthouse Dendermonde

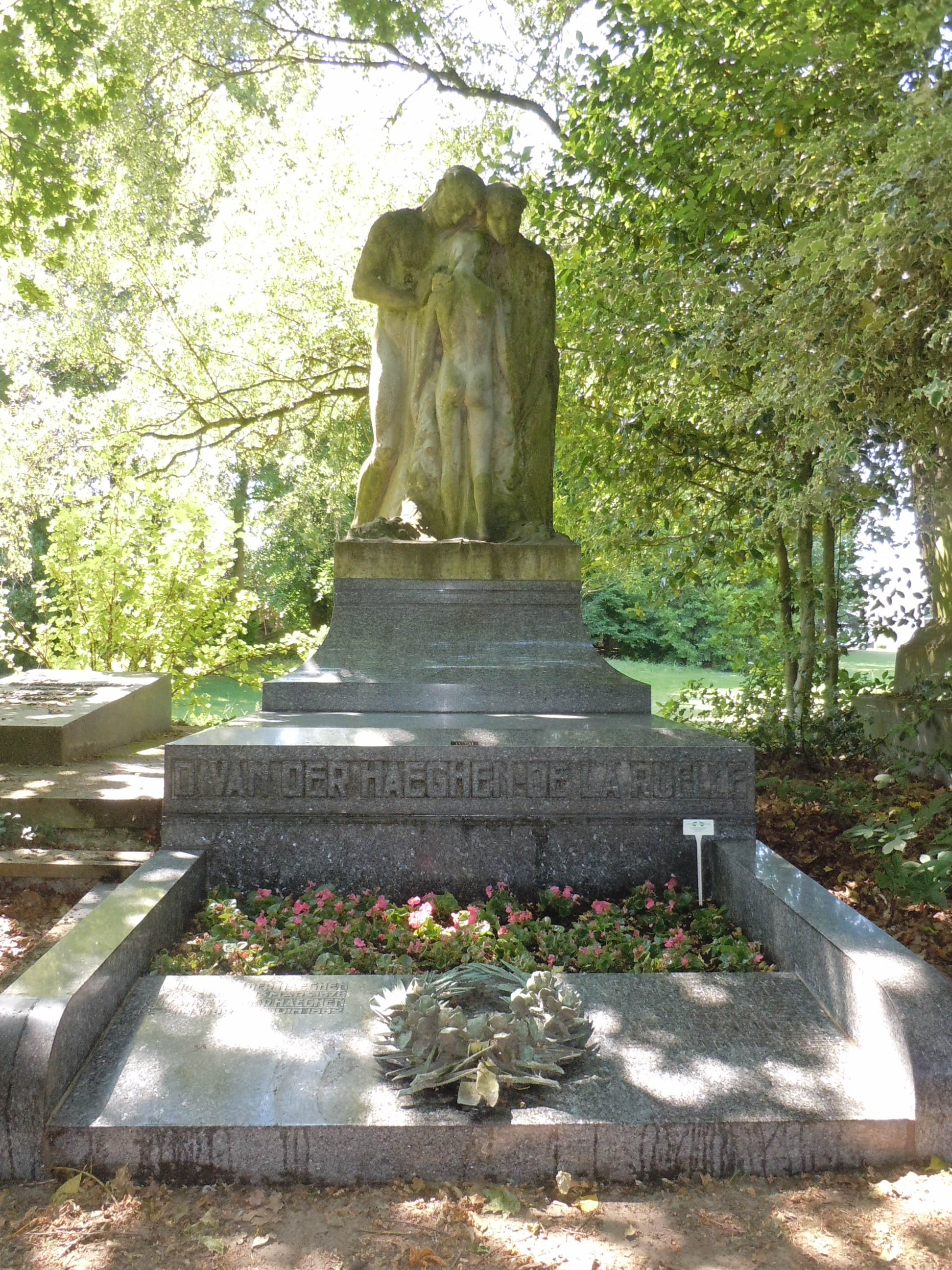
Cemetery Westerbegraafplaats Ghent Monument Vanderhaeghen-Delaruelle

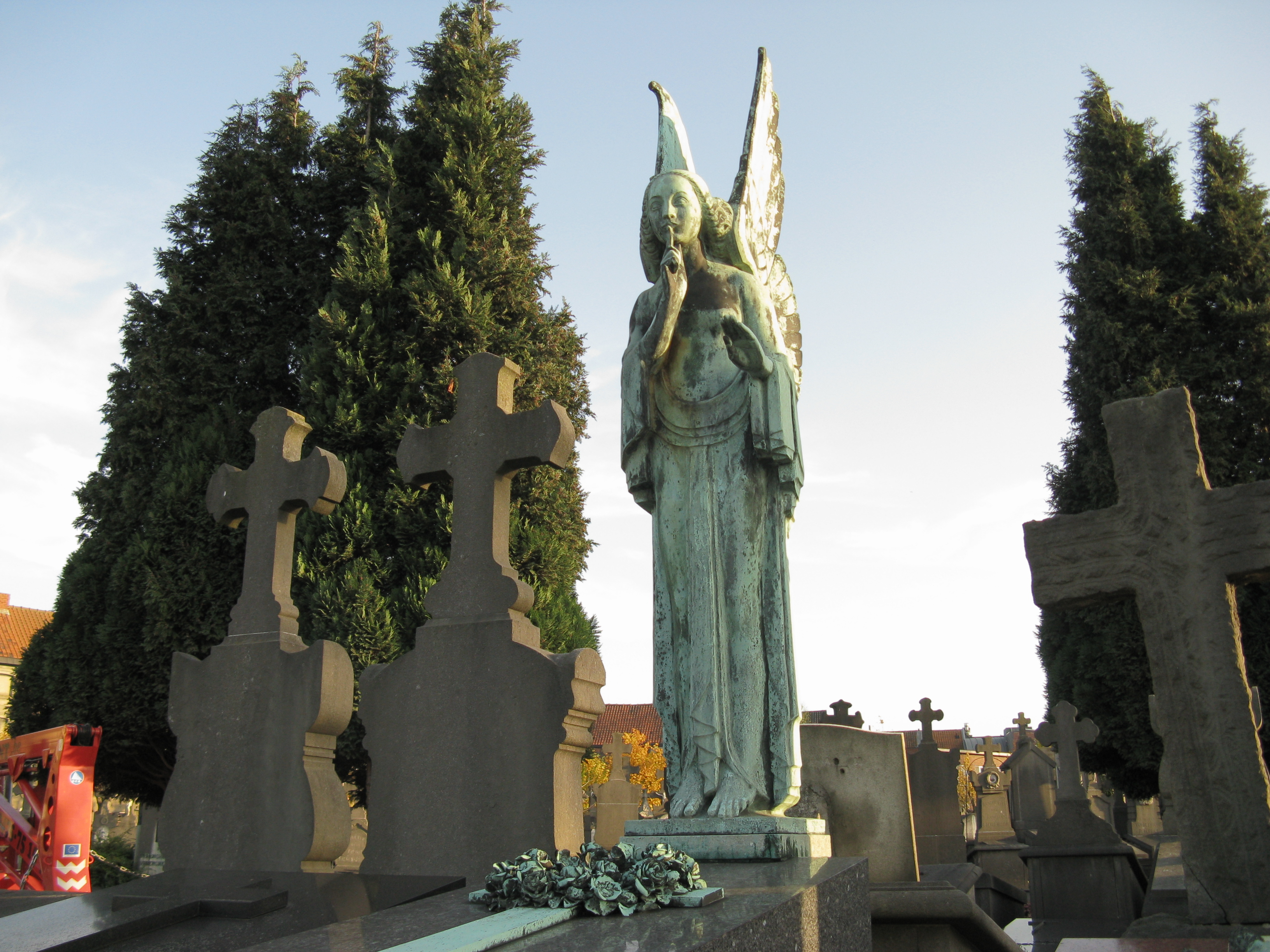
Cemetery Campo Santo Ghent Statue grave Poelvoorde-Van De Voorde
