= Community of Christ the King =

Anglican religious order in Australia

The Community of Christ the King (CCK) was an Anglican religious order of Benedictine nuns near Wangaratta, Victoria, Australia. Founded in 1993, this enclosed and contemplative order was under the jurisdiction of the Anglican Church of Australia. The convent operated guest and retreat facilities and the sisters provided a ministry of spiritual direction.

CCK's origins were in the Community of the Holy Name based in the Melbourne suburb of Cheltenham, Victoria. In 1974 three members of CHN, who wished to live an enclosed contemplative life rather than an active one, began to live such a life within the grounds of CHN's Cheltenham headquarters. From 1981 the three sisters lived in a separate home, called the House of Christ the King. In 1984 the sisters went to England to live with the enclosed and contemplative Community of the Sisters of the Love of God in Fairacres, Oxford. On their return to Australia two years later they were joined by a further two CHN sisters, but still remaining part of CHN in Cheltenham. In 1988 they were invited by the Diocese of Wangaratta to establish the community there. In 1989 they were offered a farm outside Wangaratta to which they moved the following year. In 1993 they separated from CHN and established themselves as the Community of Christ the King.

The convent was located at the foot of the Warby Ranges. The growing of produce provided some level of self-sufficiency and generated the labour needed to live the Rule of St Benedict. Silent retreats were held at the convent for visitors. The Revd Mother was Rita Mary CCK since 31 July 1997.

The community is still formally extant, although there is only one remaining sister who lives in an old-age facility.

== Sources ==
- Anglican Religious Communities Yearbook: 2004-2005. Norwich: Canterbury Press, 2003.
