= Harrington Lees =

British-born Anglican bishop (1870–1929)

The Right Reverend Harrington Lees
- Archbishop of Melbourne
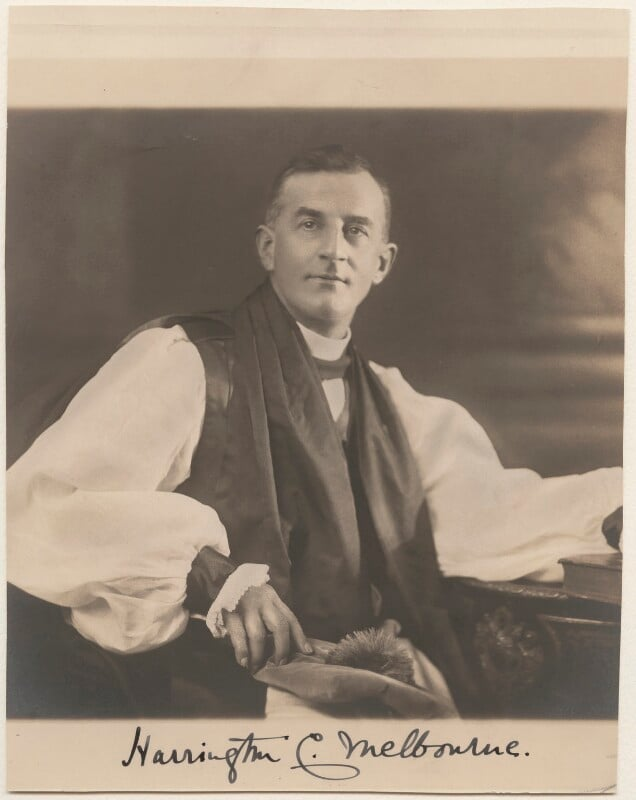
- Lees, c. 1920s
- Diocese: Diocese of Melbourne
- In office: 1921 – 1929 (d.)
- Predecessor: Lowther Clarke
- Successor: Frederick Head

Orders
- Ordination: 1893 (deacon); 1894 (priest) by William Stubbs (Oxford)
- Consecration: 1921 by Randall Davidson (Canterbury)

Personal details
- Born: Harrington Clare Lees; 17 March 1870 Ashton-under-Lyne, Lancashire, UK
- Died: 10 January 1929 (aged 58)
- Denomination: Anglican
- Education: St John's College, Cambridge

Harrington Clare Lees (17 March 1870 – 10 January 1929) was the Anglican Archbishop of Melbourne from 1921 until his death.

Lees was born in Ashton-under-Lyne, Lancashire, United Kingdom, the eldest son of William Lees, a cotton farmer and Justice of the Peace.

== Publications ==
Lees' published works include:

- St Paul's Epistles to Thessalonica (1905)
- The Work of Witness and the Promise of Power (1908)
- The Joy of Bible Study (1909)
- The King's Highway (1910)
- St Paul and his Converts (1910), third impression (1916)
- Christ and his Slaves (1911)
- The Sunshine of the Good News (1912)
- The Divine Master in Home Life (1915)
- The Practice of the Love of Christ (1915)
- The Eyes of his Glory (1916)
- St Paul's Friends (1917)
- The Love that Ceases to Calculate (1918)
- God's Garden and Ours (1918)
- Failure and Recovery (1919)
- The Starting Place of Victory (1919)
- The Promise of Life The Life that is in Christ Jesus (1919)
- The Divine Master in Home Life

Lees was also a contributor to Hastings' A Dictionary of Christ and the Gospels.
