= Dampoort, Ghent =

Neighbourhood of the city of Ghent, Belgium

Dampoort
- Neighbourhood of Ghent
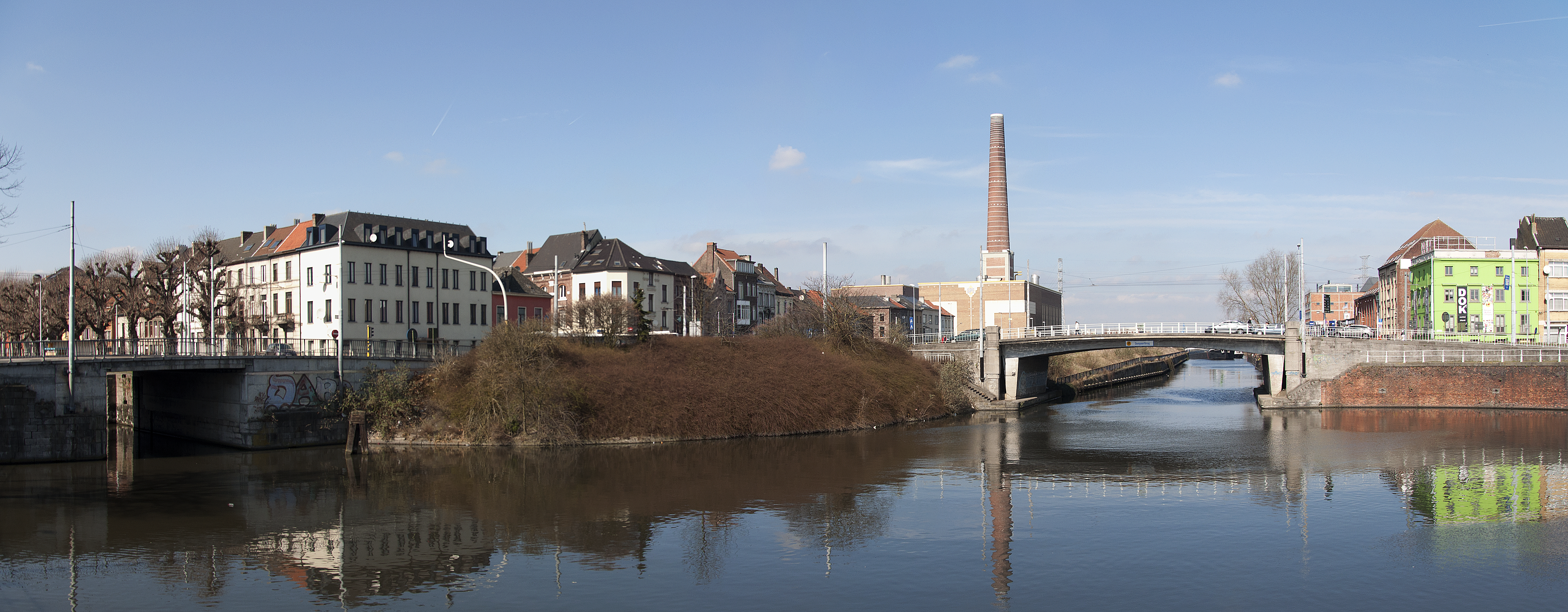
- The winding hole
- Interactive map of Dampoort
- Location within Belgium Location within East Flanders
- Coordinates: 51°03′20″N 3°44′27″E
- Country: Belgium
- Community: Flemish Community
- Region: Flemish Region
- Province: East Flanders
- Arrondissement: Ghent
- Municipality: Ghent

Population (2023)
  - Total: 12,870
- Postal codes: 9000
- Area codes: 09

Dampoort (Dutch pronunciation: [ˈdɑmpoːrt]; also Dampoortwijk) is a neighbourhood in the city of Ghent in Belgium. In 2023, Dampoort had a total population of 12,870. 48% of residents are of foreign origin. Nowadays it is mainly known as the location of railway station Gent-Dampoort and a major crossroads. In former times it used to be the eastern gate of the city (poort being Dutch for "gate"). It opened the city towards the region of Waasland (or Land van Waas) and Antwerp.

It is also where the commercial seaport of Ghent links with the inner-city canals. Close to the Dampoort is Portus Ganda, the yachting area of the city, which opened in 2005, at the former confluence of the rivers Schelde (English: Scheldt) and Leie.

== See also ==
- Campo Santo, Cementerie
