= Field Flowers Goe =

Anglican bishop (1832–1910)

Field Flowers Goe (10 February 1832 – 25 June 1910) was an Australian Anglican Bishop of Melbourne.

Goe was born in Louth, Lincolnshire, England, the only son of Field Flowers Goe, a solicitor, and his wife Mary Jane. In 1861, he married Emma, the daughter of William Hurst; they had no children. .
