= Christopher Barlow =

Christopher George Barlow
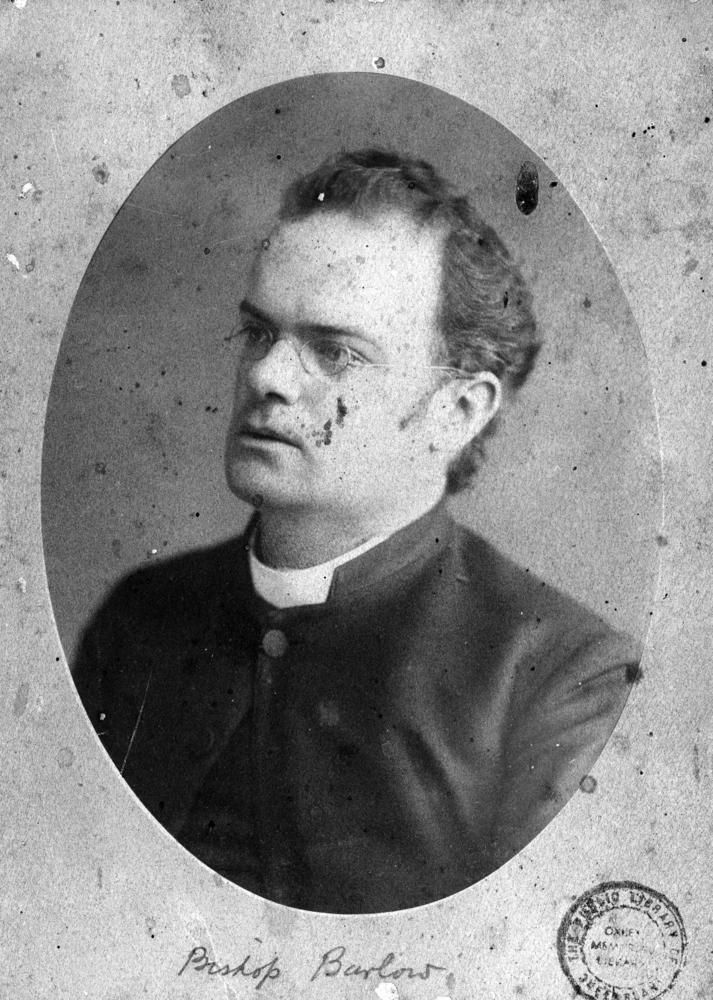
- Christopher George Barlow
- Born: 9 December 1858; Dublin, Ireland
- Died: 30 August 1915 (aged 56); Cooma, NSW, Australia

Christopher George Barlow (9 December 1858 – 30 August 1915) was an Anglican bishop in Australia. He was a Bishop of North Queensland and a Bishop of Goulburn.

== Early life ==
Barlow was born in Dublin and educated at Blackrock College before going into his stepfather's business. Later he went to Australia to be Secretary to his friend George Henry Stanton, the first Anglican Bishop of North Queensland.

== Religious life ==
Ordained deacon in 1881 his first position was as a curate at Mackay. After he was ordained priest in 1882, he held incumbencies at St Paul's, Charters Towers 1882–1885, and at St James's Pro-Cathedral, Townsville 1886–1891. He was a missionary priest 1885–1886, and was in 1887 made honorary Canon, before succeeding Stanton as Bishop of North Queensland in 1891. He received the degree Doctor of Divinity (DD) the same year, after he was nominated bishop.

Barlow was consecrated an Anglican bishop on 25 July 1891. He was translated to Goulburn in 1902, with his election on 28 January and installation on 23 April. He established a short-lived theological college, the Clergy Training College, Goulburn, in 1906.

== Later life ==
Barlow died on 30 August 1915, shortly after retiring on 31 March, and is buried at Mulwaree.

== Legacy ==
A street in Townsville is named in his memory.

Church of England titles
Preceded by George Stanton	Bishop of North Queensland; 1891 –1902	Succeeded by George Frodsham
Preceded by William Chalmers	Bishop of Goulburn; 1902–1915	Succeeded by Lewis Radford
