= Lewis Radford =

British-born Anglican bishop (1869–1937)

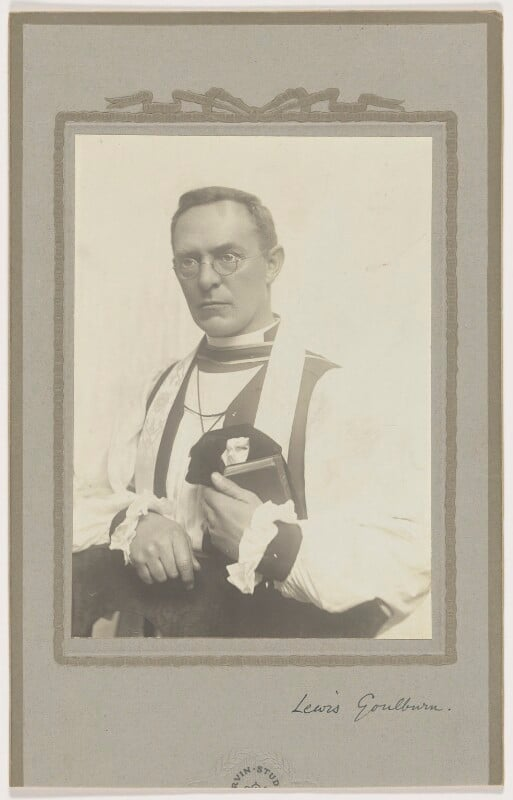
Radford, c. 1910s

Lewis Bostock Radford (5 June 1869, Mansfield – 2 April 1937, London) was an Anglican bishop and author.

Radford was the son of John Radford, a solicitor. He was educated in Mansfield and at St John's College, Cambridge, where he graduated BA in 1890 and MA in 1894. He was ordained in 1892 and his first position was as a curate at Holy Trinity, Warrington. He then held incumbencies at St Peter's Forncett and then Holt, Norfolk. After moving to Australia, he was the warden of St. Paul's College, Sydney before being elected as Bishop of Goulburn on 18 May 1915. He was consecrated a bishop on 24 August 1915, installed on 31 August 1915 and served until his retirement on 31 December 1933.

In 1918 he invited three army chaplains to establish a religious order at Bishopthorpe, the former home of the bishops of Goulburn. This religious order was the Community of the Ascension, which opened in 1921, and which was the first Anglican male religious order to successfully open in Australia. It existed until 1943.

His last position was as the Rector of Kemerton. He died on 2 April 1937. Radford College, a school in Canberra, is named after him.

== Works ==
- Thomas Becket before his Consecration (1894)
- Epistle to Diognetus (1908)
- Cardinal Beaufort (1908)
- Three Teachers of Alexandria (1908)
- History of Holt. A Brief Study of Parish, Church and School (1909)
- Ancient Heresies in Modern Dress (1913)
- Colossians and Philemon (1930)

Church of England titles
Preceded by Christopher Barlow	Bishop of Goulburn; 1915–1933	Succeeded by Ernest Burgmann
