= Valentin Vaerwyck =

Belgian architect

Valentin Vaerwyck (3 March 1882, in Ghent – 27 November 1959) was a Flemish Belgian architect.

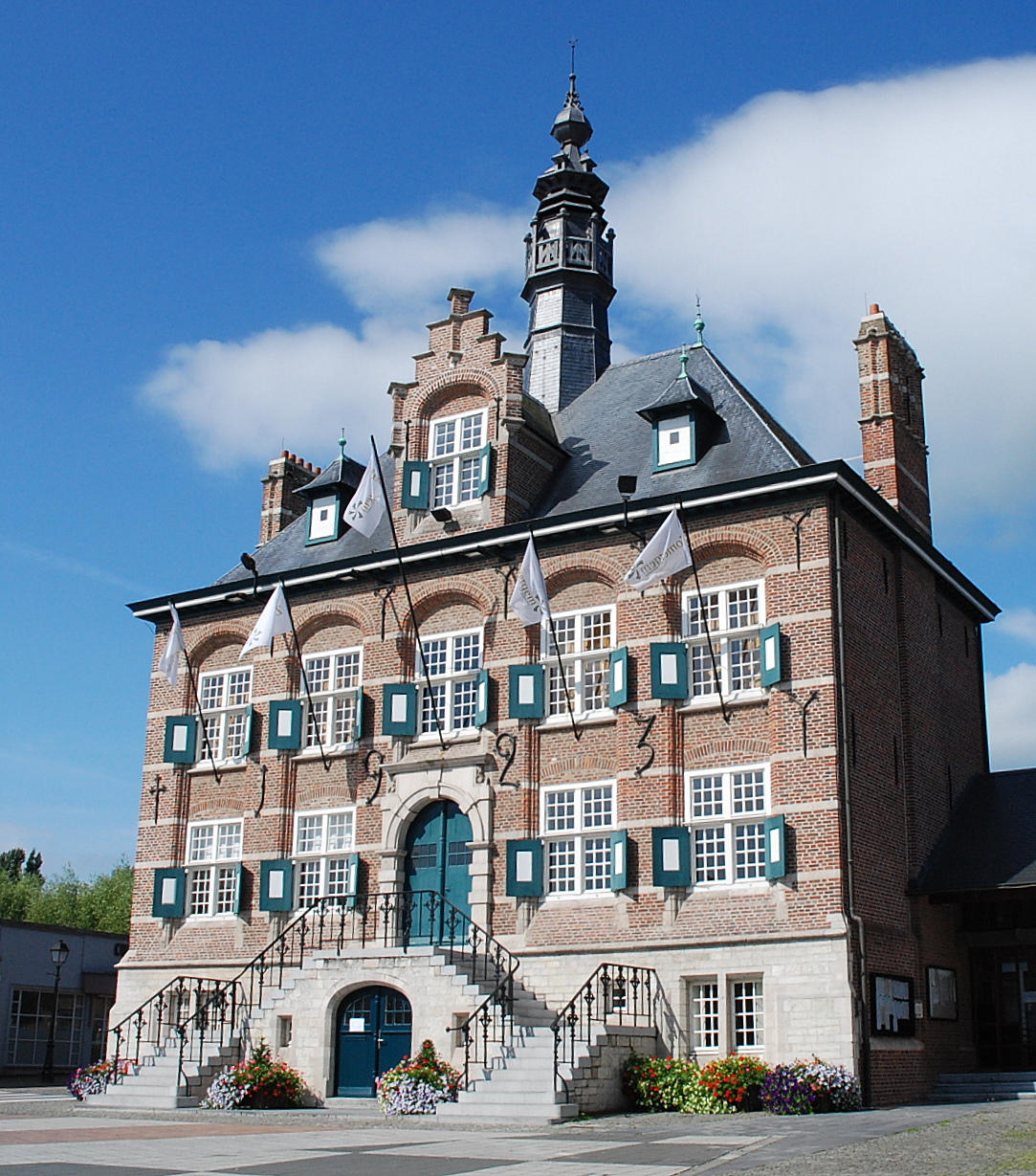
Town hall in Zomergem, 1923

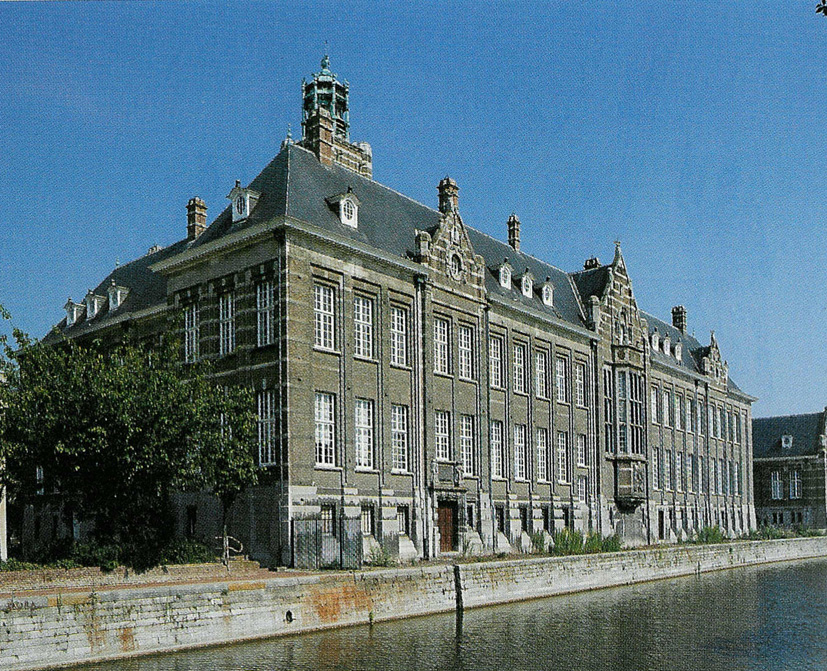
Dendermonde courthouse, 1927

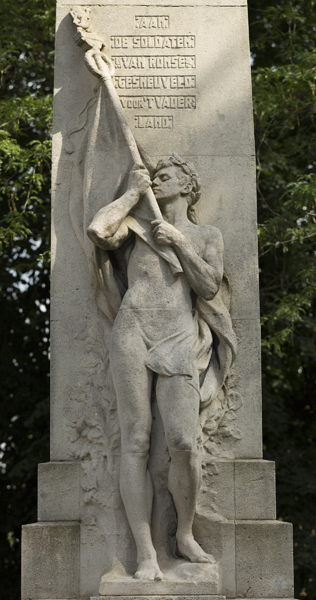
War monument in Ronse
