= Aloïs De Beule =

Belgian sculptor

Bust of Aloïs De Beule by his collaborator Modest Van Hecke (1928)

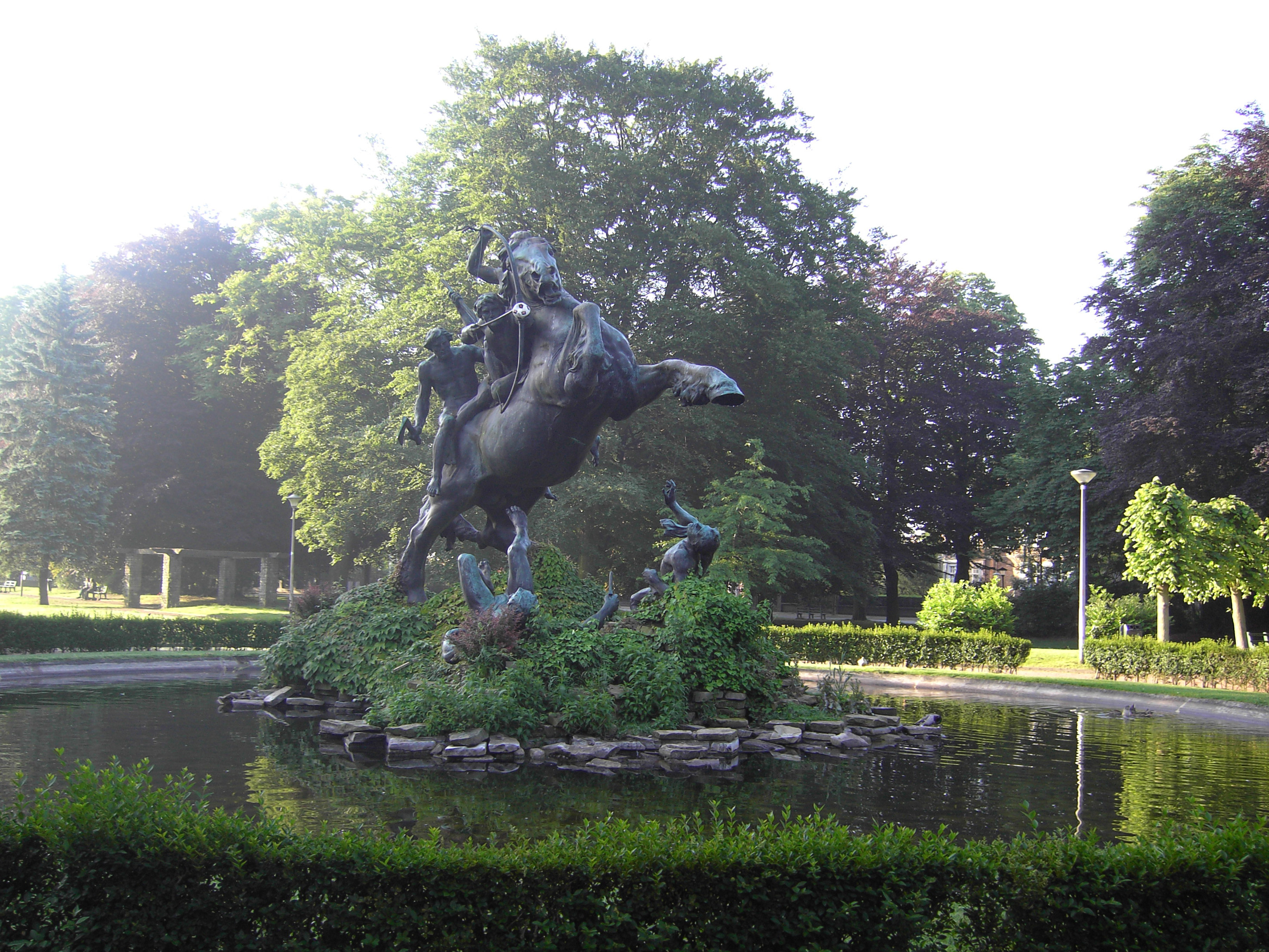
Statue of 'Ros Beiaard' in Ghent

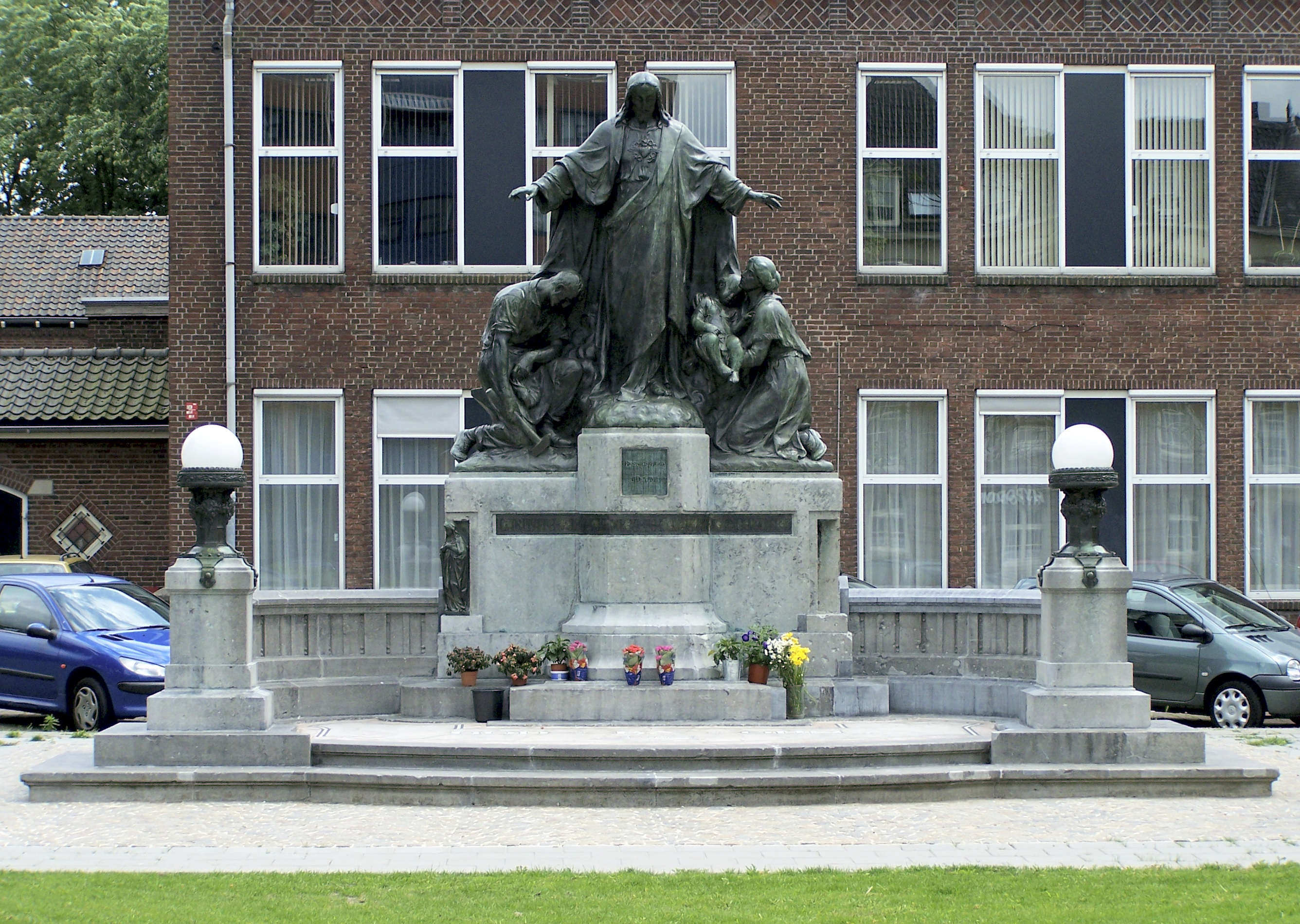
Statue of the Sacred Heart in 's-Hertogenbosch, the Netherlands

Aloïs De Beule (27 August 1861 in Zele – 15 December 1935 in Ghent) was a Belgian sculptor.

== Biography ==
Aged ten he entered his father's shoemaking business. He studied at the Royal Academy of Fine Arts and the Sint-Lucasschool in Ghent where he won the first prize in sculpture in 1888. Around 1889 he and his brother Emile set up a studio together. They began in a barn in the Sint-Pietersdorp (Sint-Pieters-Aalst) district of Ghent, on the spot where Het Ros Beiaard stands - he produced that sculpture for the World Exhibition of 1913 in Ghent, in collaboration with Domien Ingels, and it proved a breakthrough for both of them. De Beule was also later commissioned by the architects Jean-Baptiste Bethune and Valentin Vaerwyck. His pupils included Geo Verbanck, Leo Sarteel, Oscar Sinia, Jules Vits and Modeste Van Hecke.

== Works ==
- The monument to the Peasants' War in the church square in Overmere
- Ros Beiaard
- Bronze statue of Adriaan Poirters in Oisterwijk
- Stations of the Cross for (among others) the Sint-Jacobskerk in Ghent, the Sint-Quintinuskerk in Zonhoven, the Church of the Annunciation in London, St Anne's Church in Liverpool and St Augustine's Church in Ramsgate
- Gilded statue of St Gudule in the Cathedral of St Michael and St Gudule, Brussels, 1912
- Statue of the Sacred Heart in the Emmaplein in 's-Hertogenbosch
- Busts of (among others) Antoon Stillemans, Hendrik Conscience and Prudens Van Duyse
- Monument to the fallen in the town park in Ruiselede, 1923
- Crucifix and Calvary in the pilgrimage route in Bareldonk Berlare
- Bronze statue of Christ the King in the church in Ophasselt, near Geraardsbergen

== Gallery ==
Gothic Revival station of the cross, Uitbergen

Peasants' War memorial, Overmere

Recueillement

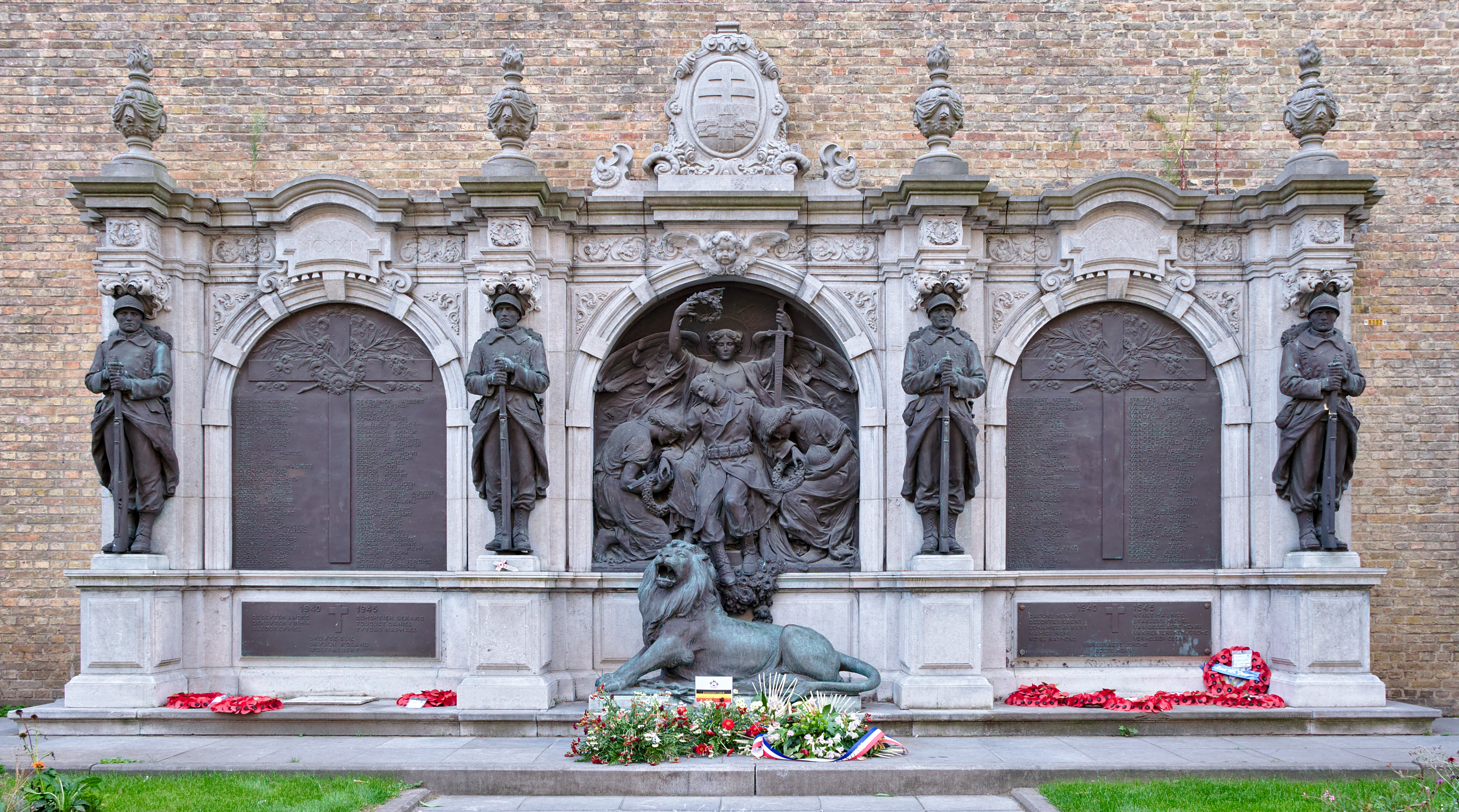
'Fury of Ypres' war memorial

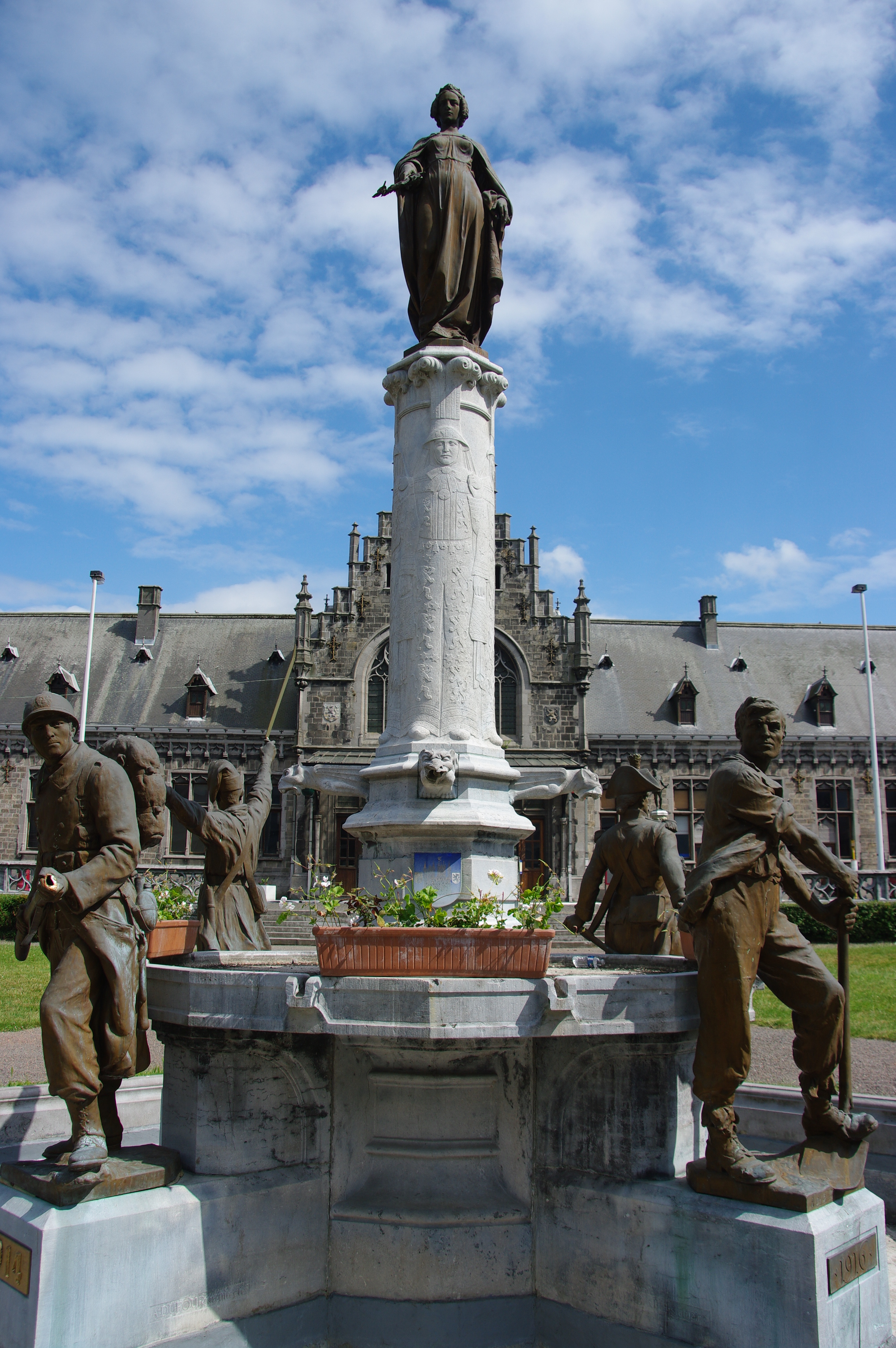
Independence Monument, Binche
