= St Wilfrid's Theological College, Cressy =

Former Anglican theological college in Australia

Coordinates: 41.615799°S 146.976618°E

St Wilfrid's Theological College was an Australian educational institution in Bishopsbourne, Tasmania, established in 1904 and which closed in 1929. It trained candidates for ordination in the Church of England in Australia (as the Anglican Church of Australia was then called). Its history is closely tied up with that of Christ College, but it was a separate institution from either the first (1846) or second (1929) foundations of the latter.

== Christ's College (1846 foundation) ==
The first Bishop of Tasmania (then still called Van Diemen's Land) was Francis Nixon, who was appointed in 1842 and arrived in the colony the following year. In 1845 Nixon purchased 1,218 acres at Bishopsbourne in the Tasmanian Midlands for use a college. Nixon's intention was that the college would develop along the lines of an Oxbridge college, and thereby provide the basis for university education in Tasmania, and also to be a theological college. The Hutchins School in Hobart and Launceston Grammar School were established at the same time, in order to act as feeder schools. The result was Christ's College (with a possessive 's'). This college, however, was poorly managed, and closed in 1856.

== St Wilfrid's (1904 foundation) ==
James Denton Toosey (1801-1883) was a pastoralist and businessman who first arrived in the colony in 1826. When the first Christ's College closed in 1856, Toosey was appointed a trustee, and under his care the institution's debts were discharged after 14 years. On his death in 1883 he left bequests to enlarge Holy Trinity Church in Cressy, and to endow a theological college at his estate at Richmond Hill, Cressy, near to the site of the former college in Bishopsbourne. It took 21 years for the theological college to open; when eventually it did, it was called St Wilfrid's.

== Closure of St Wilfrid's and the re-establishment of Christ College (1929 foundation) ==
Although St Wilfrid's existed for 25 years, it struggled to attract students and funding, particularly in its remote location. The intended chapel was never built. The college closed in 1929, but not before the Christ College Act 1926 was enacted (and it was from the 1926 Act that Christ's became Christ), which permitted the trustees of Christ to close St Wilfrid's. Toosey's stewardship of Christ College's assets had enabled Christ to be re-established in Hobart in 1879. In 1929 the re-founded Christ College (then a residential college of the University of Tasmania) moved to new premises in Hobart, and at that point St Wilfrid's ceased theological training and merged with Christ; the last Warden of St Wilfrid's became the first warden of the new Christ College. St Wilfrid's effectively became the theological faculty of the University of Tasmania: it published a journal called The Wilfridian, which was the journal of an Order of St Wilfrid. Both were named for the former theological college: the Order of St Wilfrid had been established in 1922 for students at St Wilfrid's; after merger it was adopted for divinity students of Christ College. On its closure, the St Wilfrid's library was amalgamated with that of Christ College.

Over the 25 years of its separate existence, 56 students entered St Wilfrid's, 36 of whom proceeded to ordination. Annual clergy retreats were held at St Wilfrid's; that in 1928 was conducted by the Rev E C Kempe of the Community of the Ascension in Goulburn.

== Wardens ==
All the wardens of St Wilfrid's were also the incumbents of Holy Trinity, Cressy. In 1903, at the time that the theological college was being prepared, the name of the Rev Arnold Gale Lingley was discussed as first warden, but nothing came of this proposed appointment.

- Richard Charles Nugent Kelly, 1904–08.
- Herbert Robert Finnis, 1908–21.
- Donald Burns Blackwood, 1921–24. Blackwood was subsequently Bishop of Gippsland, 1942–54.
- William Rothwell Barrett, 1924–29. Barrett was subsequently assistant bishop of Tasmania, 1955–63.
