= Brotherhood of St Laurence =

Australian anti-poverty organisation

The Brotherhood of St. Laurence (BSL) is an Australian not-for-profit anti-poverty organisation. BSL has its headquarters in Melbourne but provides services and programs across Australia.

== Programs and Services ==
Programs and services focus on

- children and families – in the early years, both at home and in school
- young people – moving through secondary school and into work or further education
- adults – seeking employment and training
- older people – facing the challenges of retirement and ageing.
- people living with disability

Within this broad framework, the Brotherhood pays particular attention to issues relating to refugees and settlement, financial inclusion and social inclusion.

== History and beginnings ==
BSL was founded on 8 December 1930 in the Anglican parish church of St Stephen in Adamstown, Newcastle in New South Wales. Its founder, Father Gerard Kennedy Tucker, dreamed of building a dedicated group of like-minded people who would serve the church and the community. BSL was established as a religious order of the Anglican Church and members included priests and lay brothers.

In 1933, BSL accepted the invitation of Canon Maynard of St Peter's, Eastern Hill, Melbourne (with the approval of the Archbishop of Melbourne) and moved to St Mary's Mission in Fitzroy to help people living in poverty in that neighbourhood. Young men who wished to serve others in the name of Christ came together as a community at St Mary's and attended lectures at St Peter's. They lived simply, studied, prayed, and helped with social welfare activities.

At the height of the Great Depression, when some 30% of the workforce was jobless, BSL became more actively involved in helping unemployed people and their families. After the 1939–45 War, there was little interest in expanding BSL as a religious order. However, the welfare work of BSL continued and expanded under Father Tucker's leadership. He believed that the role of the organisation was to provide a 'fence at the top of the cliff rather than ambulances at the bottom,’ and he deployed a range of clever tactics to achieve social change including producing films, public campaigns, letters to newspapers and other advocacy. BSL's tradition of exploring new ways to address disadvantage through innovation, research, partnerships, and advocacy continues to this day.

== Social policy and research ==
The Social Policy and Research (SPARC) team conducts research on the causes, consequences and measurement of poverty, inequality and socioeconomic disadvantage. BSL has a longstanding partnership with the University of Melbourne. It also houses a library and collaborates with other researchers, government agencies and community organisations.

Research areas include:

- poverty and social exclusion
- inclusive education
- work and economic security
- inclusive ageing
- energy, equity, and climate change

SPARC illegally underpaid numerous early-career staff between 2017-2022. The Social, Community, Home Care and Disability Services Industry Award stipulates minimum pay points for workers with university degrees and guarantees consideration for experience-based promotions above these minimums for workers with at least one year of relevant experience. SPARC breached the requirements of the Award by remunerating these staff at levels below these minimums and refusing to consider their promotion to pay points beyond these minimums when they accumulated sufficient experience.

== Disability services ==
National Disability Insurance Scheme (NDIS)

BSL has partnered with the National Disability Insurance Agency (NDIA) to deliver Local Area Coordination (LAC) and early childhood services for the National Disability Insurance Scheme (NDIS) across the North East Melbourne, Hume Merri-bek, Brimbank Melton, Western Melbourne and Bayside Peninsula areas.

This service includes supporting those living with disability to access community and mainstream services and resources and supporting people who meet the NDIS access requirements to navigate and engage effectively with the NDIS.

== Social enterprises ==
The Brotherhood has 24 community stores (also known as op-shops) across greater Melbourne and Geelong where it sells donated furniture, clothing and other household items.

== Staff and Volunteers ==
In 2024, BSL employed over 1500 staff and around 1250 volunteers across the organisation.

== Governance ==
BSL is an income tax-exempt charity, has deductible gift recipient status and is registered with the Australian Charities and Not-for-profits Commission.

== Partnerships and Corporate support ==
BSL provides corporate volunteering and donation opportunities and has a range of partnerships with charities as well as businesses (e.g. ANZ bank) and councils (e.g. Yarra City Council).
