= Lowther Clarke =

The Most Reverend Lowther Clarke
- Archbishop of Melbourne
- Clarke c. 1916
- Church: Anglican
- Province: Australia

Personal details
- Born: Henry Lowther Clarke; 23 November 1850 Westmorland, England
- Died: 23 June 1926 (aged 75) Witney, England
- Residence: Lymington, Hampshire
- Spouse: Alice Lovell (m. 1876; died 1918)
- Children: 3
- Education: Sedbergh School; St John's College, Cambridge

Henry Lowther Clarke (23 November 1850 – 23 June 1926) was the fourth Anglican bishop and first archbishop of Melbourne, Australia.

== Early life ==
Clarke was born at Firbank Vicarage, Westmorland, England, the son of the Revd William Clarke and his wife Sarah, née Lowther.

Clarke was ordained deacon in 1874 and priest in 1875 by William Thomson, the Archbishop of York. He was curate of St John's Kingston-on-Hull from 1874 to 1876 before various positions in the north of England during the next 26 years. He was vicar of Hedon from 1876 to 1883, then assistant master at St. Peter's school in York for a year from 1883 to 1884, when he became vicar of St. Martin, Coney-street, York. In 1890 he became vicar of Dewsbury, and in 1901 vicar of Huddersfield. He was an honorary canon of Wakefield Cathedral from 1893, and proctor for the clergy of the Wakefield diocese in the Convocation of York in 1902.

== Melbourne ==
Clarke was approached for nomination as Bishop of Melbourne and announced his acceptance of this in early September 1902. The following month he received the degree Doctor of Divinity (DD) from the University of Cambridge. He was consecrated Bishop by the Archbishop of Canterbury in St Paul's Cathedral, London, on 1 November 1902, and arrived in Melbourne in February 1903.

== Notes ==
Anglican Communion titles
Preceded by Field Flowers Goe	Bishop of Melbourne; 1903–1905	Became Archbishop
First	Archbishop of Melbourne; 1905–1920	Succeeded by Harrington Lees
