= Chris McLeod =

Australian clergyman

The Right Reverend Chris McLeod
- Assistant bishop, Anglican Diocese of Adelaide; National Aboriginal bishop
- Church: Anglican Church of Australia
- Diocese: Adelaide
- Installed: 11 April 2015
- Other post: Dean of St Peter's Cathedral, Adelaide (2021-present)

Orders
- Consecration: 11 April 2015 by Jeffrey Driver

Personal details
- Denomination: Anglican
- Spouse: Susan
- Children: 3
- Education: Tabor College (MMin); Flinders University (BTh)

Christopher McLeod is an Australian bishop in the Anglican Church of Australia. He has been an assistant bishop in the Anglican Diocese of Adelaide, as the Bishop for Aboriginal Ministry, since April 2015. McLeod is the second Australian National Aboriginal Bishop, and is only the third Aboriginal person to be a bishop in Australia (and the first in South Australia). He has also been the dean of St Peter's Cathedral, Adelaide, since 31 October 2021.

McLeod is a Gurindji man whose country is located within the Northern Territory, southwest of Katherine. His mother and grandmother were part of the Stolen generation, and his mother was brought to Adelaide by a priest who had set up a number of places for Aboriginal people to come to. Prior to becoming a bishop, McLeod worked alongside Indigenous people for over 20 years. His appointment immediately prior to being appointed as a bishop was as rector of St Jude's Church in Brighton in Adelaide.

McLeod was appointed assistant bishop in the Diocese of Adelaide in 2015. He became only the third Aboriginal Australian to become a bishop, after Arthur Malcolm who served in the Diocese of North Queensland from 1985 to 2000, and Jim Leftwich who served in the same diocese from 2001 to 2010. He is the second to hold office as National Aboriginal Bishop (after Leftwich).

McLeod has encouraged Christians to incorporate an acknowledgement of country into their gatherings as an "acceptable and respectful practice".

In August 2021, McLeod was announced as the next dean of St Peter's Cathedral, Adelaide, with his installation on 31 October 2021.
