= Saibo Mabo =

Australian bishop

The Right Reverend Saibo Mabo
- Assistant Bishop of North Queensland; National Torres Strait Islander Bishop
- Church: Anglican Church of Australia
- Diocese: North Queensland
- Installed: 24 February 2002
- Term ended: 2015

Orders
- Consecration: 24 February 2002 by Phillip Aspinall

Personal details
- Born: 14 May 1947
- Died: 12 May 2017 (aged 69)
- Denomination: Anglican
- Spouse: Sania
- Children: 2 sons
- Education: Nungalinya College

Saibo Mabo (14 May 1947 – 12 May 2017) was an Australian bishop in the Anglican Church of Australia. He served as an assistant bishop in the Anglican Diocese of North Queensland from 2002 to 2015, and as National Bishop to the Torres Strait Islander people during that time.

== Early life and ministry ==
Mabo was a Meriam man, who was born in 1947 on Thursday Island in the Torres Strait in Queensland. He was the nephew of indigenous rights activist Eddie Mabo.

Mabo commenced ministry from the age of 17 after he felt he was being called to work as a priest. He was educated at Nungalinya College and then spent his ministry supporting indigenous people in Far North Queensland and across Australia. Before being consecrated as bishop, Mabo travelled to South America, England and New Zealand, to learn more about his faith.

== Episcopal ministry ==
In 2002, Mabo was chosen as an Assistant Bishop in the Anglican Diocese of North Queensland following the death of his predecessor serving the Torres Strait Islands, Ted Mosby. Mosby's appointment had coincided with a split in Torres Strait churches arising out of the merger of the former Anglican Diocese of Carpentaria, with some church choosing to secede and join the Traditional Anglican Communion as an independent church, the Church of Torres Strait, and then Anglican Archbishop of Brisbane Peter Hollingworth refusing the new church to use Anglican church buildings for its services. Mabo's appointment was seen as an opportunity for reconciliation in the region by the Anglican Church of Australia and he was appointed as a "national" bishop to all Torres Strait Islanders, both on the islands and in mainland Australia.

Mabo was consecrated on 24 February 2002 in the All Souls and St Bartholomew's Cathedral Church on Thursday Island by Anglican Archbishop Phillip Aspinall. Following Murray Island custom, Mabo was escorted from his home, 200 metres from the church, to the steps of the church by island elders.

Mabo spent his first year as bishop visiting the congregations who had broken away from the Diocese in 1997 and 1998 in protest at the appointment of Mosby. He described the year as "challenging" but "successful", claiming he had received "many people into the Anglican Church from different denominations, not just the breakaway churches".

As Bishop, Mabo spent time representing the Anglican Church of Australia on the National Aboriginal and Torres Strait Islander Ecumenical Council. Together with local Member of Parliament Warren Entsch, Mabo led a successful restoration project of the Quetta Church Hall on Thursday Island as a community initiative, with Entsch serving as Patron and Mabo as chair of the project. Mabo also was instrumental in supporting the Torres Strait community following the murder of eight children in the Cairns suburb of Manoora in December 2014.

Mabo served as bishop until mid-2015 when he retired from the role, following which he became the local parish priest at All Souls and St Bartholomew's Cathedral Church.

== Death ==
Mabo died two days before his 70th birthday on 12 May 2017 after a short illness, his funeral service being held on 16 June 2017 at St Bartholomew's, the same place where he was consecrated as a Bishop in February 2002.

Mabo was survived by his wife Sania, two children and seven grandchildren.
