= David John Garland =

Anglican clergyman and a military chaplain

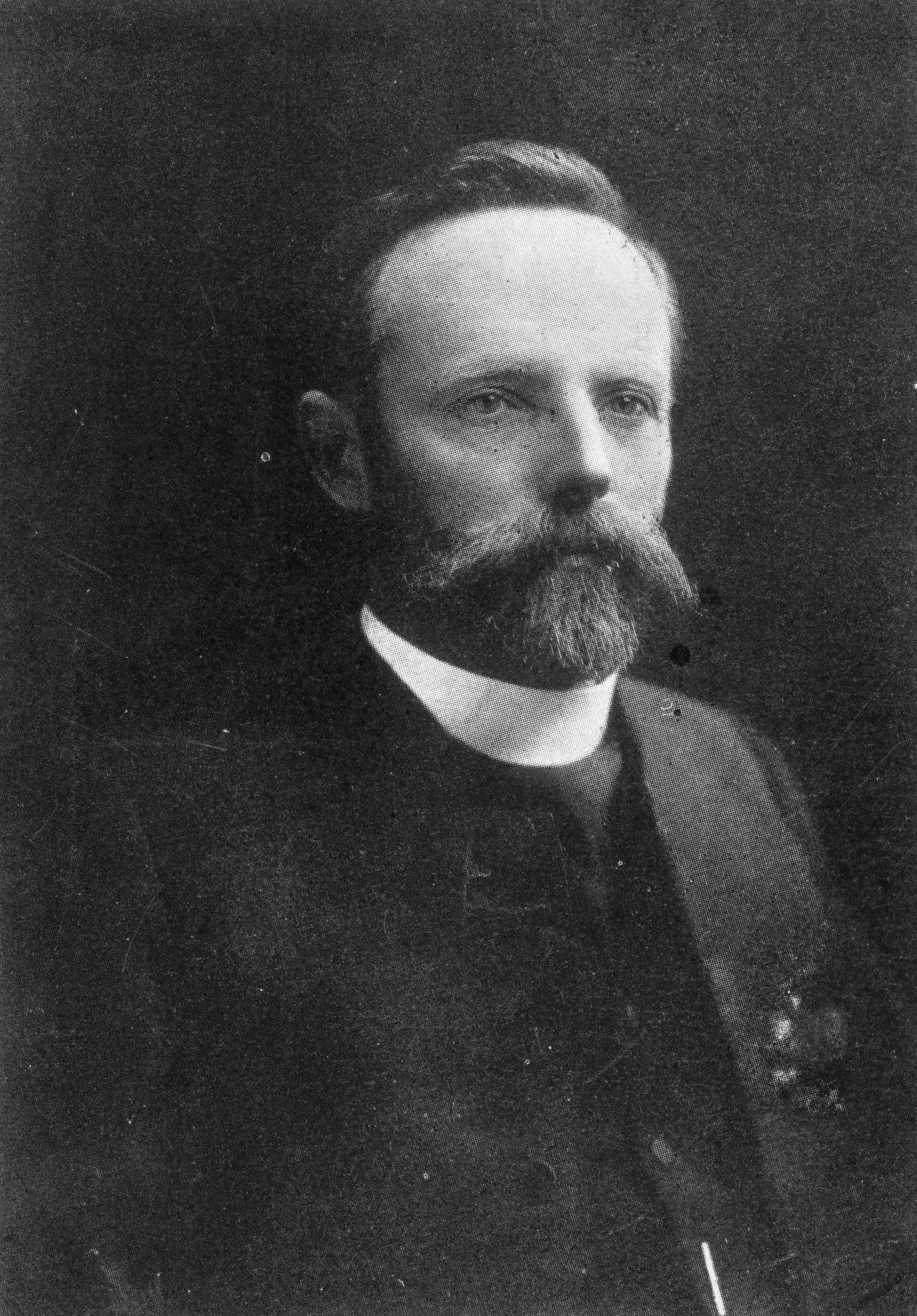
Canon David John Garland

David John Garland (1864–1939) was an Anglican clergyman and a military chaplain in Queensland, Australia. As senior army camp chaplain in Queensland from 1914 to 1917, Garland experienced the World War I both at home and at the front. He was one of the originators of the now annual Anzac Day ceremonies. Described as "overpoweringly energetic with a distinctive flair, if not genius, for organisation", he played a pivotal role in the Queensland experience of the war, and was a central figure in a variety of committees and organisations established to aid the war effort and support or commemorate serving or returned soldiers.

== Early life ==
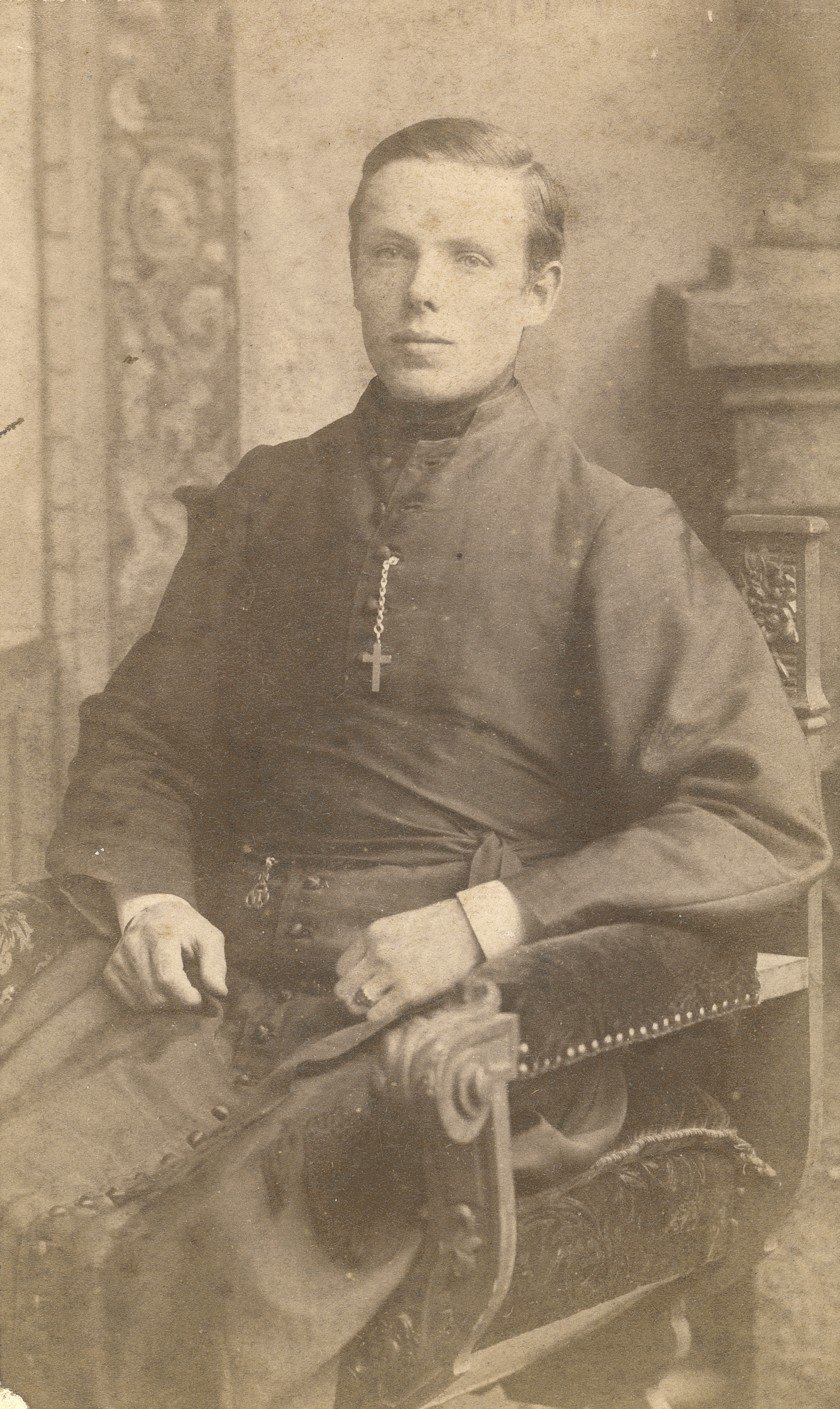
Canon David John Garland, as a young man

David John Garland was born in Dublin on 4 October 1864, the son of James Garland and his wife Mary Ann (née Saunders). He studied law and immigrated with his parents to New South Wales.

Garland came to Brisbane in 1886. He worked in Toowoomba as a law clerk, where he was influenced by Reverend Tommy Jones at St James’ in Toowoomba and converted from his Irish Protestant faith to Anglo-Catholicism. He became a lay reader at St James.

Garland entered the Church of England ministry in 1889. He served as a deacon in Grafton, Quirindi and Narrandera in New South Wales. In 1892 he was sent to Perth, Western Australia, where he was ordained as a missionary priest by Bishop of Perth Henry Parry. In 1892 he married a widow, Mary Hawkins, née Hadfield, and they had one son, David James Garland. From 1900 to 1902, he was canon of Perth. Garland was a crusader for religious education in schools and devoted much energy to the Bible in State Schools League. During the Boer War, he was chaplain to the soldiers assembling at Fremantle before heading overseas. His last posting in Western Australia was at St John's in Northam, a congregation of whom he said "I never met a more docile and reverent congregation".

In March 1902, he left Western Australia for St James's Church in Sydney to be a temporary replacement for Rev. Carr Smith who was travelling to Europe, but the move may also have been motivated by a fallout with his bishop in Western Australia. In Sydney he spoke out against the proposed federal Divorce Bill, arguing that making divorce easier would weaken marriage ties.

In December 1902 Garland was appointed rector of St Paul's in Charters Towers, a canon of St James Cathedral, Townsville, Queensland and was appointed archdeacon of North Queensland in 1903. He continued his work in advocating bibles for state schools in Queensland. From 1907 to 1912, Garland was rector at Holy Trinity Anglican Church at Woolloongabba in Brisbane.

In August 1912, Garland moved to New Zealand to lead the Bibles in Schools movement in that country.

== World War I ==
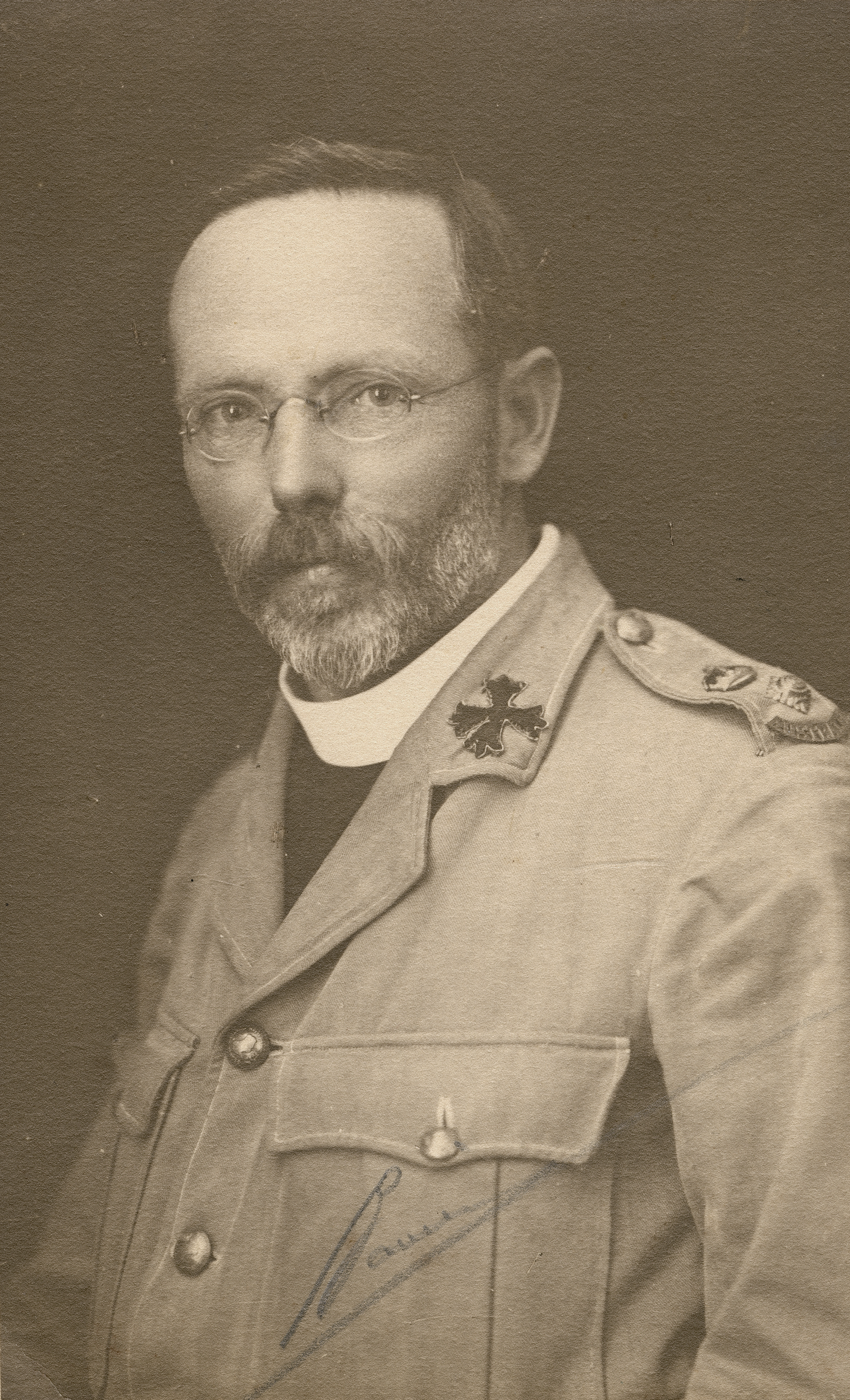
Canon David John Garland, in uniform

At the outbreak of war Garland was in Brisbane, and served as chaplain to soldiers in training camps, as they prepared for active service overseas. He also organised the provision of Bibles and prayer books to Queensland soldiers at the front. As a Senior Army Chaplain, Garland worked tirelessly in the training camps in and around Brisbane and further afield.

In 1915 he founded the Soldiers Help Society. He also travelled Queensland as honorary organising secretary of the Queensland Recruiting Committee, preaching to encourage greater enlistment. He was an ardent supporter of conscription, co-founded the Compulsory Service League, served on the Executive of the National Council for the Referendum and founder of the Universal Service League.

Garland is perhaps most remembered as an architect and originator of Anzac Day ceremonies. In Queensland on 10 January 1916, Garland was appointed the honorary secretary of the Anzac Day Commemoration Committee of Queensland (ADCCQ) at a public meeting which endorsed 25 April as the date promoted as “Anzac Day” in 1916 and ever after. Devoted to the cause of a non-denominational commemoration that could be attended by the whole of Australian society, Garland worked amicably across all denominational divides, creating the framework for Anzac Day commemorative services. Garland is specifically credited with initiating the Anzac Day march, the wreath-laying ceremonies at memorials and the special church services, the two minutes silence, and the luncheon for returned soldiers. Garland intended the silence to be used in lieu of a prayer to allow the Anzac Day service to be universally attended, allowing attendees to make a silent prayer or remembrance in accordance with their own beliefs. He particularly feared that the universality of the ceremony would fall victim to religious sectarian disputes.

Through this period, Garland was an active correspondent with his fellow priest and army chaplain William Maitland Woods. Garland's letters detailed his everyday duties as archdeacon and later canon in the Anglican Church. He detailed his involvement in the Anzac Day Commemoration Committee, and the establishment of Anzac Day in Queensland. He also wrote of his efforts in recruiting with varying degrees of optimism or despondency, depending on how the conscription debate was leaning. Both men exchanged news of their families, in particular their sons, who were on active service.

The wartime letters cease in August 1917, with Garland's news that he would be joining Woods in the Middle East, having been appointed representative of the Church of England in Australia to inquire into the "moral and social" needs of the Australian men in Egypt. With a large sum of money at his disposal, Garland had been placed in charge of the Church of England Fund for Soldiers at the Front. Garland travelled to Egypt and served 1918–19 in the Middle East where he founded eight clubs for Australian troops, and was the first chaplain to celebrate the Eucharist in the Anglican chapel of the Church of the Holy Sepulchre following the expulsion of the Turks from Jerusalem. In addition he raised funds for memorials and hospitals, and for soldiers’ hostels and care of soldiers’ graves at home and abroad.

== Later life ==
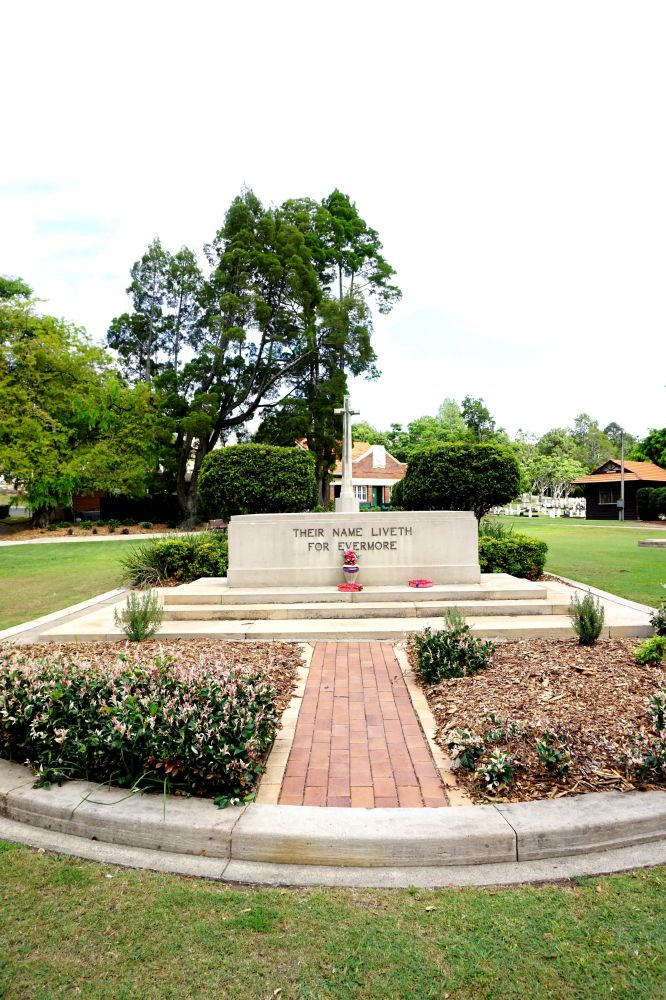
Stone of Remembrance and Cross of Sacrifice in Toowong Cemetery, 2015

Upon his return to Queensland in 1920, Garland became rector of Ithaca and continued a career of community involvement, including presidency of the New Settlers’ League from 1926. He was awarded an O.B.E. in 1934.

From 1920 until 1930, Garland conducted Anzac Day ceremonies in Toowong Cemetery. In 1924, through his fund-raising efforts, a Cross of Sacrifice and Stone of Remembrance were placed in the cemetery. On Remembrance Day 1930, ANZAC Square in the Brisbane CBD was officially opened and the services at Toowong Cemetery were transferred to ANZAC Square.

Garland died on 9 October 1939 and was buried on 10 October 1939 in Toowong Cemetery.

== Legacy ==
The Canon Garland Memorial Society was established on 9 July 2013 at the Holy Trinity Anglican Church at Woolloongabba, Brisbane. The society seeks to honour David Garland's role during the Australian centenary commemorations of World War I.

In November 2015, the Brisbane City Council officially opened a lawn garden called Canon Garland Place at Toowong Cemetery with a commemorative information board. Canon Garland Place is located where he held his Anzac Day services in the cemetery and behind The Cross of Sacrifice and Stone of Remembrance that were funded through Garland's fundraising activities.

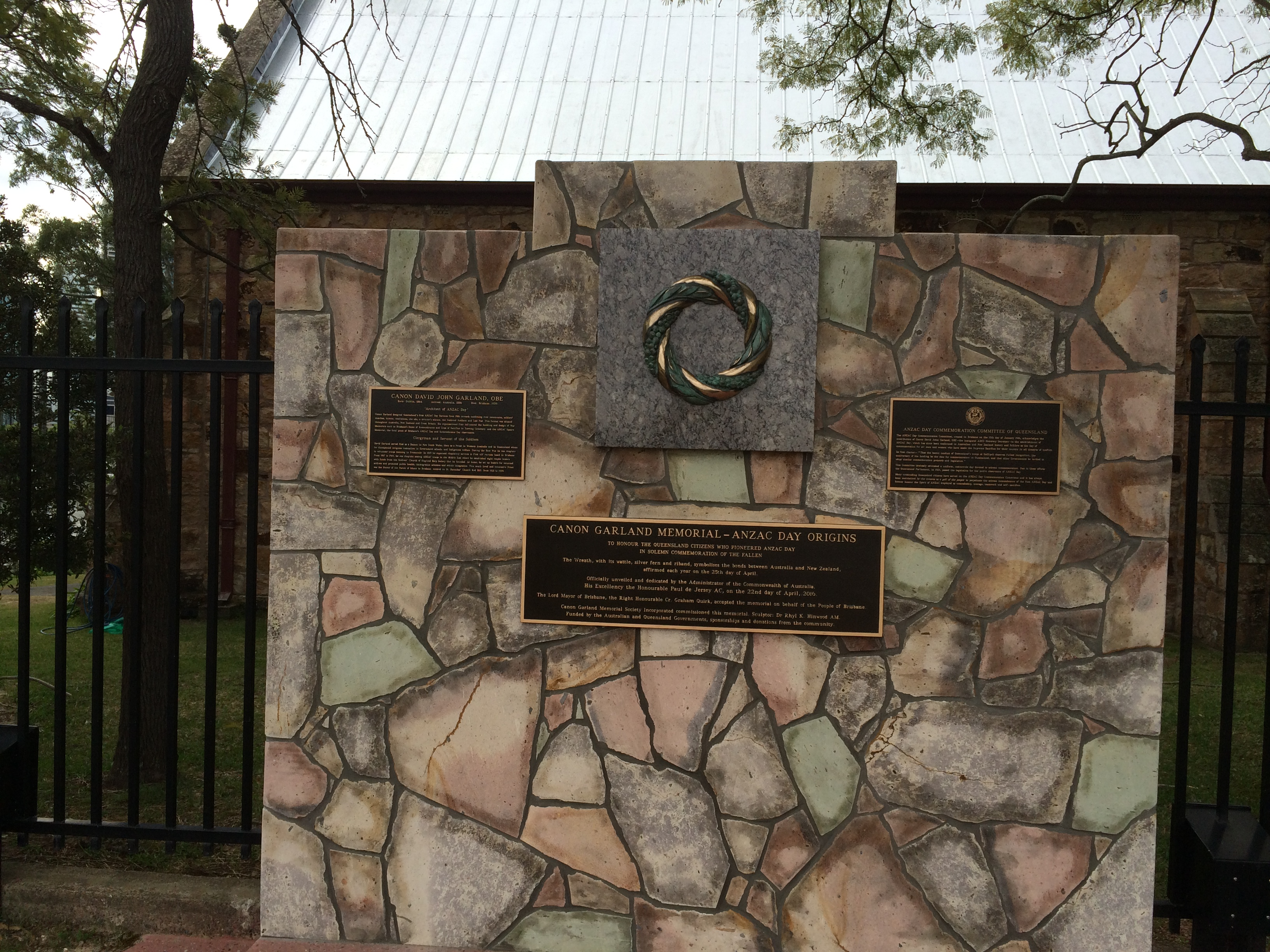
Canon Garland memorial, Kangaroo Point cliffs, 2016

In April 2016, a memorial to Garland was unveiled at the Kangaroo Point Cliffs in Brisbane. The bronze wreath was sculpted by Rhyl Hinwood.

The State Library of Queensland holds various collections of Garland's papers. In 2015, the State Library digitised his First World War letters. This collection consists of letters received by Garland from Australian army soldiers, nurses and chaplains serving abroad during World War I, as well as carbon copies of his replies. Also included are letters from his colleague The Reverend William Maitland Woods regarding the discovery, evacuation and transportation to Australia of the Shellal Mosaic. Transcriptions of the digitised letters are also available. Some of Garland's letters are also part of the OM74-101 Maitland Woods Papers 1915–1916.

As a result of a citizens e-petition, on 9 October 2019 (the 80th anniversary of the death of Garland), the overpass across the Western Freeway adjacent to the Toowong Cemetery (formerly known as the Toowong Bicycle and Pedestrian Overpass) was renamed the Canon Garland Overpass.
