= John Feetham (bishop) =

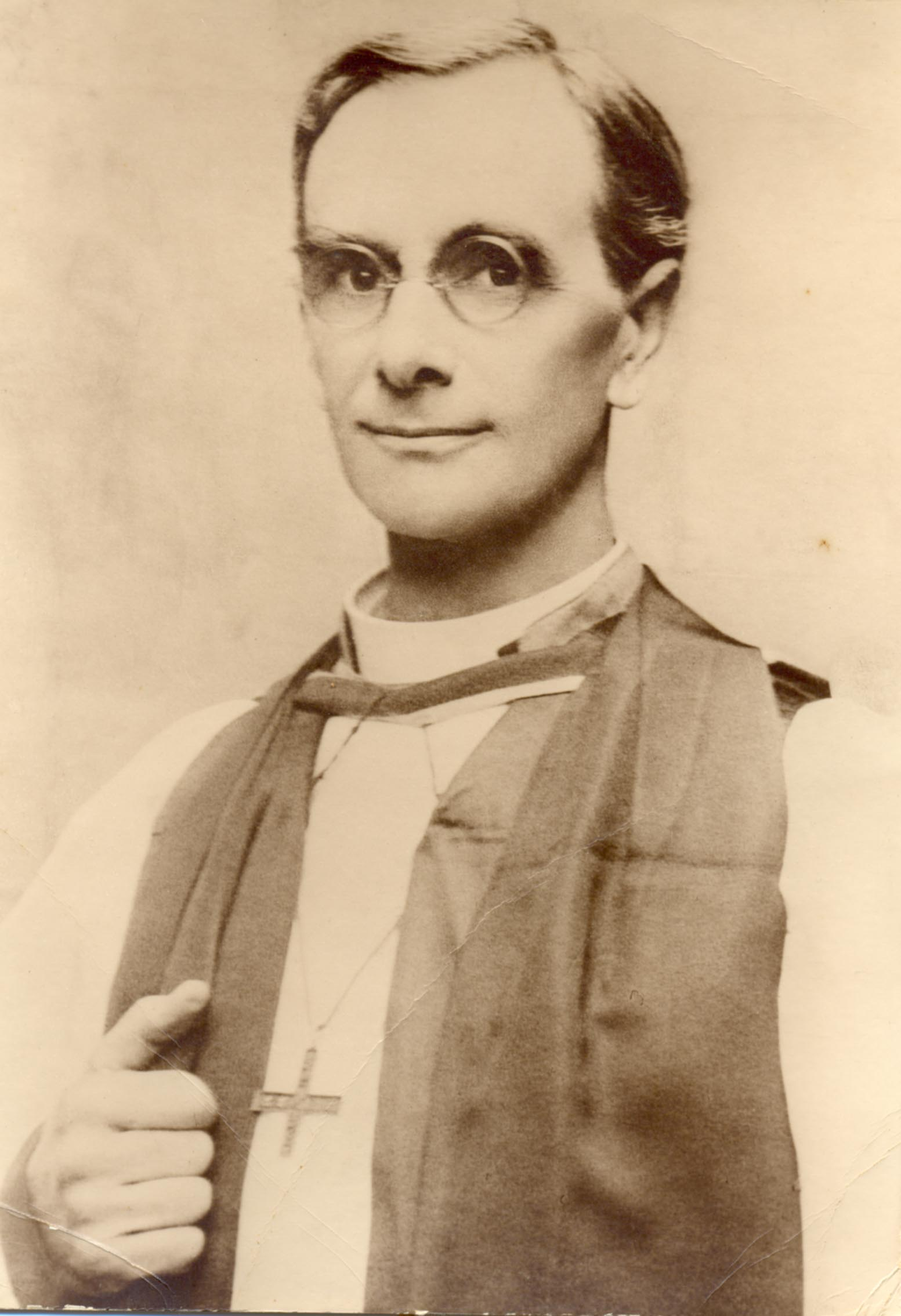
The Rt. Revd. John Oliver Feetham (1873-1947), Anglican Bishop of North Queensland from 1913 to 1947.

John Oliver Feetham (28 January 1873 – 14 September 1947) was a long-serving Anglican bishop in Australia, who was aligned with the Anglo-Catholic tradition. He was the Anglican Bishop of North Queensland from 1913 until his death in 1947.

== Early life ==
Feetham was born into an ecclesiastical family, his father was the Reverend William Feetham, Rural Dean of Raglan, Monmouthshire and his mother the daughter of an archdeacon. He was educated at Marlborough College and Trinity Hall, Cambridge.

== Religious life ==
Feetham was ordained in 1899. After a curacy at St Simon Zelotes, Bethnal Green, he was Principal of the Brotherhood of the Good Shepherd (one of the Australian Bush Brotherhoods). In 1913 he was ordained to the episcopate as the fourth Bishop of North Queensland.

Feetham established a number of Anglican schools in North Queensland:

- All Souls and St Gabriel's in Charters Towers
- St Anne's in Townsville (now the Cathedral School)
- St Mary's School in Herberton

== Later life ==
Feetham died on 14 September 1947 and his ashes were interred beneath the high altar at St James' Cathedral, Townsville.

Feetham is commemorated in the Australian Anglican calendar on 15 September.

Anglican Communion titles
Preceded by George Horsfall Frodsham	Bishop of North Queensland; 1913 –1947	Succeeded by Wilfrid Bernard Belcher
