= Bishop of North Queensland =

Bishop of North Queensland may refer to:

- Anglican Bishop of North Queensland
- Roman Catholic Bishop of Townsville, North Queensland
- Roman Catholic Bishop of Cairns, Far North Queensland
