= Ian Shevill =

Australian Anglican bishop (1917–1988)

The Right Reverend Ian Shevill AO
- Church: Anglican Church of Australia
- Diocese: North Queensland
- Installed: 23 April 1953
- Term ended: 1970
- Predecessor: Wilfrid Belcher
- Successor: John Lewis
- Other post: Bishop of Newcastle (1973–1977)

Orders
- Ordination: 1941
- Consecration: 19 April 1953

Personal details
- Born: Ian Wotton Allnutt Shevill; 11 May 1917 Broken Hill, New South Wales, Australia
- Died: 3 November 1988 (aged 71) Auchenflower, Queensland
- Spouse: June Stephenson (m. 1959; died 1970) Margaret Ann Brabazon (m. 1974)

Ian Wotton Allnutt Shevill AO (11 May 1917 – 3 November 1988) was an Australian Anglican bishop.

== Early life and education ==
Ian Shevill was educated at Scots College, Sydney, and Sydney University, then at Moore Theological College and the Australian College of Theology.

== Ordained ministry ==
Shevill was ordained in 1941 and his first position was as a curate of St Paul's, Burwood. From 1948 to 1953 he worked for the Society for the Propagation of Gospel (USPG).

In 1953, he was ordained to the episcopate as Bishop of North Queensland, a post he held for 17 years. He was enthroned on 23 April 1953 at St James' Cathedral, Townsville. Shevill was nicknamed "the boy bishop" as he was only 34 when he became Bishop of North Queensland, then the world's youngest Anglican bishop.

In 1970, Shevill's wife died and he became secretary of USPG in London. In 1973 he returned to Australia and was enthroned as Bishop of Newcastle on 6 August 1973.

Shevill retired in 1977 following a stroke and died on 3 November 1988. He opened Bible House, Townsville, on 7 November 1964 with Canon Herbert Maxwell Arrowsmith and Preston Walker of the British and Foreign Bible Society.

== Author ==
Shevill was an author, both during his work and after his retirement. Amongst others he wrote New Dawn in Papua (1946); Pacific Conquest (1948); God’s World at Prayer (1951); Orthodox and other Eastern Churches in Australia (1964); Going it with God (1969); One Man’s Meditations (1982); O, My God (1982); Between Two Sees (1988) and an autobiography, Half Time (1966), while bishop in Townsville.

== Personal life ==
Shevill married June Stephenson, an English missionary he had met in New Guinea, in 1959; she died in 1970. He married again in 1974 to Margaret Ann Brabazon at Bishopscourt Chapel in Darling Point, Sydney.

The then Bishop of Newcastle, Greg Thompson, reported in 2015 that he had been sexually abused by Shevill as a young man when he was 19 and interested in the priesthood.

Church of England titles
Preceded by Wilfrid Bernard Belcher	Bishop of North Queensland; 1953 –1970	Succeeded by Hurtle John Lewis
Preceded by James Alan George Housden	Bishop of Newcastle (Australia); 1973 –1977	Succeeded by Alfred Charles Holland
