= Ian Stuart (bishop) =

The Right Reverend Ian Stuart
- Assistant Bishop of North Queensland
- Church: Anglican Church of Australia
- Diocese: Diocese of North Queensland
- In office: 1992–1998
- Other posts: Honorary assistant bishop, Diocese of Liverpool (1999–2011); Bishop Administrator, Diocese of North Queensland (1996)

Orders
- Ordination: 1985 (deacon & priest)
- Consecration: 1992

Personal details
- Born: 17 November 1942 (age 83)
- Denomination: Anglican

Ian Campbell Stuart (born 17 November 1942) is a retired bishop of the Anglican Church of Australia and the Church of England.

== Biography ==
Stuart was born on 17 November 1942 to Campbell and Ruth Stuart (née Butcher).

In 1970, he graduated the University of New England, Australia with a Bachelor of Arts (BA) and Certificate in Education (CertEd). In 1972, he became a Member of the Australian College of Educators (MACE).

He married Megan Williams in 1976; they went on to have three children together.

He gained a diploma in Educational Administration (DipEdAdmin) from the University of Melbourne in 1977 and served as headmaster of Christchurch Grammar School, Melbourne, from 1977 to 1984.

While serving as principal of Trinity Anglican School, Queensland (1984–1993), he trained for the priesthood at St Barnabas College, Adelaide (starting in 1984), and was ordained both deacon and priest in 1985. He became a Fellow of the Australian Institute of Management (FAIM) in 1991 and gained a Master of Arts (MA) from Melbourne University. As an educator, he was warden of St Mark's College, James Cook University (1993–1996) and then principal of All Souls' and St Gabriel's School (1993–1998).

Meanwhile, he served the Diocese of North Queensland as an archdeacon (1989–1992) before becoming an assistant bishop. He was consecrated as a bishop on 22 April 1992, by Peter Hollingworth, archbishop of Brisbane, to serve as assistant bishop of North Queensland, in which post he remained until 1998. In that post, he also served the diocese as bishop administrator (presumably in 1996, between the retirement of John Lewis and the arrival of Clyde Wood.)

Stuart moved to the United Kingdom. His appointment as chaplain of Liverpool Hope University College and an honorary assistant bishop in the Diocese of Liverpool was gazetted in February 1999. He remained chaplain until 2001, when he became provost of Hope Park and director of Student Services until 2005 (when the institutions gained full university status as Liverpool Hope University). From then until his January 2011 retirement, he served as an assistant/pro-vice chancellor of Student Support & Well-being.

Having retired from Hope and as an honorary assistant bishop, he has been given the honorary title of pro vice-chancellor emeritus.
