= Keith Joseph (bishop) =

Australian Anglican bishop

The Right Reverend Dr. Keith Joseph
- Bishop of North Queensland
- Church: Anglican Church of Australia
- Diocese: North Queensland
- Installed: 31 March 2019
- Predecessor: Bill Ray

Orders
- Ordination: 2006
- Consecration: 31 March 2019 by Phillip Aspinall

Personal details
- Born: 1960 (age 65–66)
- Denomination: Anglican
- Education: University of Newcastle (PhD); Macquarie University (BA [Hons], MA)

Keith Ronald Joseph (born 1960) is an Australian bishop in the Anglican Church of Australia. He has served as the 11th Bishop of North Queensland since 31 March 2019.

Joseph holds a PhD in applied ethics. Prior to ordination, he worked as a lecturer in philosophy, as well as a soldier and officer in the Australian Army and an administrative officer with the Australian Federal Police.

He was ordained in 2006 in the Diocese of Central Melanesia in the Solomon Islands, working there until 2010.

After returning to Australia he served in the Diocese of Newcastle, Joseph worked from 2011 to 2013 as priest at the Anglican Parish of Mount Vincent, Kurri Kurri and Weston.

On 8 November 2013 Joseph was commissioned as Dean of the Darwin Cathedral, a role which he held until he was appointed Bishop of North Queensland. He also served on the board of Anglicare in the Northern Territory for 5 years during this time.

On 24 November 2018, Joseph was elected as the next Bishop of North Queensland following the retirement of Bill Ray. He was consecrated and enthroned as Bishop in St James' Cathedral, Townsville on 31 March 2019.

As bishop, Joseph has spoken out against euthanasia, arguing that it would erode trust by Indigenous Australians in the public health system if allowed.

Keith Joseph frequently visits schools around North Queensland featuring: Whitsunday Anglican School, Trinity Anglican School, and The Cathedral School of St Anne and St James.
