= Anglican Bishop of North Queensland =

Bishop of North Queensland
- Bishopric

anglican
- Coat of arms of the Diocese
- Incumbent: Keith Joseph since 31 March 2019
- Style: Right Reverend

Location
- Country: Australia
- Ecclesiastical province: Queensland
- Residence: Townsville

Information
- First holder: George Stanton
- Denomination: Anglican
- Established: 1879
- Diocese: North Queensland
- Cathedral: St James' Cathedral, Townsville

Website
- Diocese of North Queensland

The Bishop of North Queensland is the diocesan bishop of the Anglican Diocese of North Queensland, Australia.

The seat of the bishop is at St James's Cathedral, Townsville, Queensland.

Bishops of North Queensland
No	From	Until	Incumbent	Notes
1	1878	1891	George Stanton	
2	1891	1902	Christopher Barlow	Bishop of Goulburn (1902–1915)
3	1902	1913	George Frodsham	
4	1913	1947	John Feetham	later canonised as St John Oliver Feetham
5	1947	1952	Wilfrid Belcher	
6	1953	1970	Ian Shevill	Afterwards Bishop of Newcastle
7	1971	1996	John Lewis	Previously with the Society of the Sacred Mission
8	1996	2002	Clyde Wood	previously Bishop of the Northern Territory
9	2002	2007	John Noble	
10	2007	2018	Bill Ray	
11	2019	present	Keith Joseph	Previously Dean of Darwin
