= Holy Trinity Anglican Church, Woolloongabba =

Church in Brisbane, Australia

Holy Trinity Anglican Church
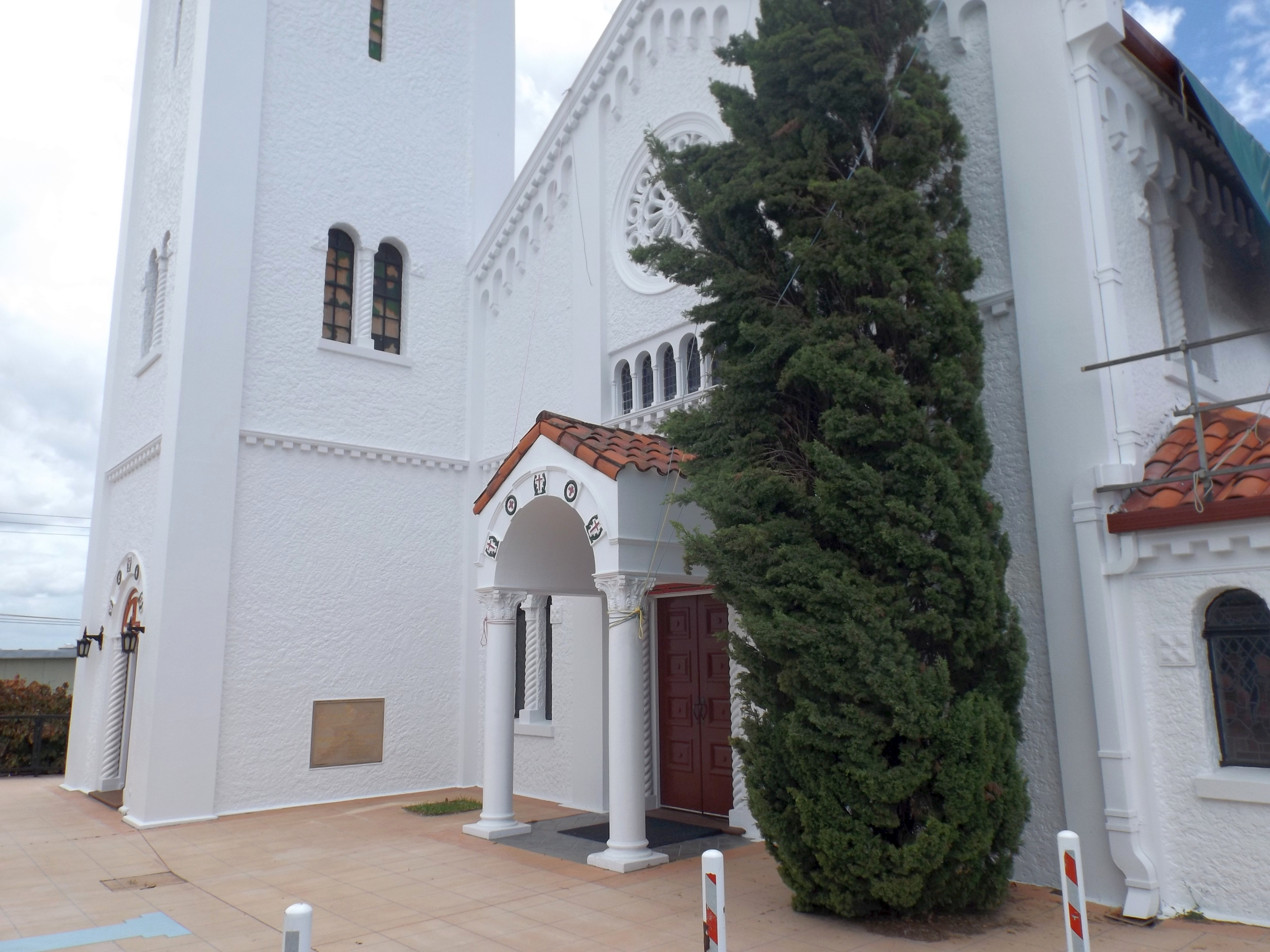
- Entrance to Holy Trinity Anglican Church, 2015
- Holy Trinity Anglican Church
- Address: 68 Hawthorne Street, Woolloongabba, City of Brisbane, Queensland
- Country: Australia
- Denomination: Anglican Church of Australia
- Website: holytrinity.com.au

History
- Status: Church
- Founded: 2 May 1930 (current building)
- Founder: Archbishop Gerald Sharp
- Dedication: Holy Trinity
- Dedicated: 4 October 1931 by Archbishop Gerald Sharp

Architecture
- Functional status: Active
- Architect: Eric Ford
- Architectural type: Church
- Style: Mission Revival; Romanesque Revival
- Years built: 1930
- Construction cost: £9,800

Administration
- Diocese: Brisbane
- Parish: Holy Trinity, Woolloongabba

Clergy
- Priest: Rev. Rosemary Gardiner

Queensland Heritage Register
- Designated: 9 May 2008
- Reference no.: 601875

Holy Trinity Anglican Church is a heritage-listed Anglican church at 68 Hawthorne Street, Woolloongabba, Brisbane, Queensland, Australia. Since 1869, three church buildings have stood on this hill top site. The current church was completed in 1930. It was designed by the architect Eric Ford, featuring Romanesque and Spanish Mission Revival style architecture. Its preserved original architectural features make the church a traditional wedding venue of inner Brisbane. The church was added to the Queensland Heritage Register on 9 May 2008.

== History ==
=== Background ===
Woolloongabba is a densely occupied suburb of Brisbane, located 2 kilometres (1.2 mi) south of the CBD. Prior to the arrival of European people, Indigenous Australians lived in the area. These were people of the Turrbal nation.

In 1825, the Moreton Bay colony, a penal colony, was established on the north bank of the Brisbane River. Free settlement in the colony by European people was allowed from 1842. From that time until the 1860s, the area south of the river that would become Woolloongabba remained an undeveloped stretch of wetland known as One Mile Swamp.

In 1851, land in the One Mile Swamp area was made available for private purchase. In 1864, a set of residential and business allotments, called the Clarence Town Estate, was sold by auction. Advertisements for the allotments cited the benefits of an uninterrupted supply of fresh water from One Mile Swamp; the development of transportation and mail routes through the area to places like Cleveland and Ipswich; and the promise of a bridge across the Brisbane River.

In 1869, an allotment at Clarence Town Estate, atop a hill at Woolloongabba was donated to the Anglican Diocese of Brisbane by the Reverend Robert Gregory Creyke (born 9 June 1820, Yorkshire – died 11 February 1889, Cleveland, Queensland). Creyke held multiple roles in the colony: he was a minister of the Church of England; district registrar for Moreton Bay from 6 January 1860; and Queensland acting deputy registrar general. The deed of the allotment had been acquired in 1861 by his late son, also Robert Creyke, and Mary Ann Peterson. Meanwhile, a Church of England congregation had formed in the area. Its meetings and services were held in local buildings such as the Buffalo Hotel on the corner of Ipswich road and Hawthorne Street.

=== 1870–1874 ===
In 1870, a simple wooden church was built after a design by the Irish born, Australian architect, Richard Gailey (1834–1924). At this time, the church was called, Woolloongabba Church of England, South Brisbane. In 1873, the church was represented by Mr Robinson and children of the Sunday school at a meeting of the Church of England Sunday School Union in the City Botanic Gardens. This first church building blew down in a storm in October 1874.

=== 1875–1889 ===
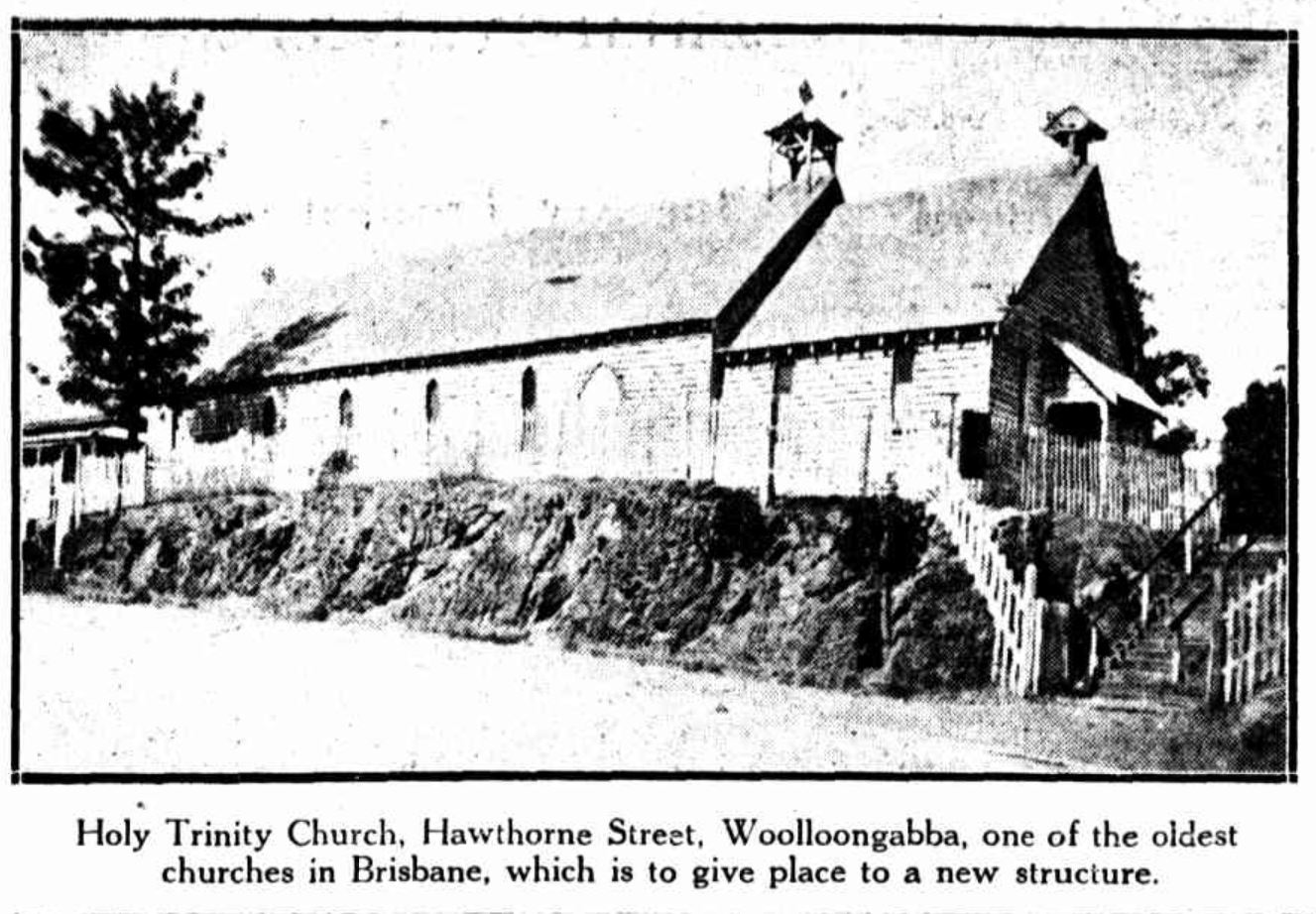
The church, 1927

A second church building was dedicated for service on 23 May 1875 by the Archdeacon Benjamin Glennie. It was known as Holy Trinity Church, Woolloongabba. It was built on a rectangular plan with a steeply pitched shingled roof and gables. Like the first church building, it was a rudimentary, timber structure. In their report of 1880, the Holy Trinity Churchwardens compared it to a woolshed. Improvements were difficult due to a lack of funds. The churchwardens went as far as raffling a chestnut horse in order to raise the monies needed. Eventually, the church ceiling was lined and a bell was installed. In 1884, a communion table was purchased.

The Reverend Hugh Thomas Molesworth (born June 1860, New Brompton, Kent – died 30 June 1930 Brisbane) was appointed curate-in-charge of Holy Trinity in 1886. At that time, Holy Trinity was a church within the Parish of South Brisbane but the congregation was growing. For instance, in 1886, the Holy Trinity Sunday School numbered 143 children and 24 teachers. Molesworth proposed the formation of a Woolloongabba parish, separate from that of South Brisbane. On 19 January 1888, the Holy Trinity Church of England Parish of Woolloongabba was constituted by the Brisbane Church of England Diocesan Council. Reverend David Ruddock (1850–1920) was appointed rector. He ministered at the church until 1893 and was replaced by the Reverend Hugh Simmonds.

In November 1889, a new wooden church hall and Sunday school were opened. The hall was designed by the Brisbane architect, John Henry Burley. It measured 66 feet (20 m) by 25 feet (7.6 m). By 1890 a rectory was constructed on the site to the design of diocesan architect, John Hingeston Buckeridge. This was in use until destroyed by fire in 1956.

On 4 November 1895, two men were executed by hanging at Boggo Road Gaol. Reverend Simmonds, Rector of Woolloongabba Parish, in which the gaol stands, attended to one of the men, an Aboriginal man called Jacky. The priest of Holy Trinity Woolloongabba, then Reverend W. P. Oakeley, also attended a condemned Aboriginal man called Billy Broom at Boggo Road Gaol on Monday 11 June 1900.

=== 1900–1914 ===
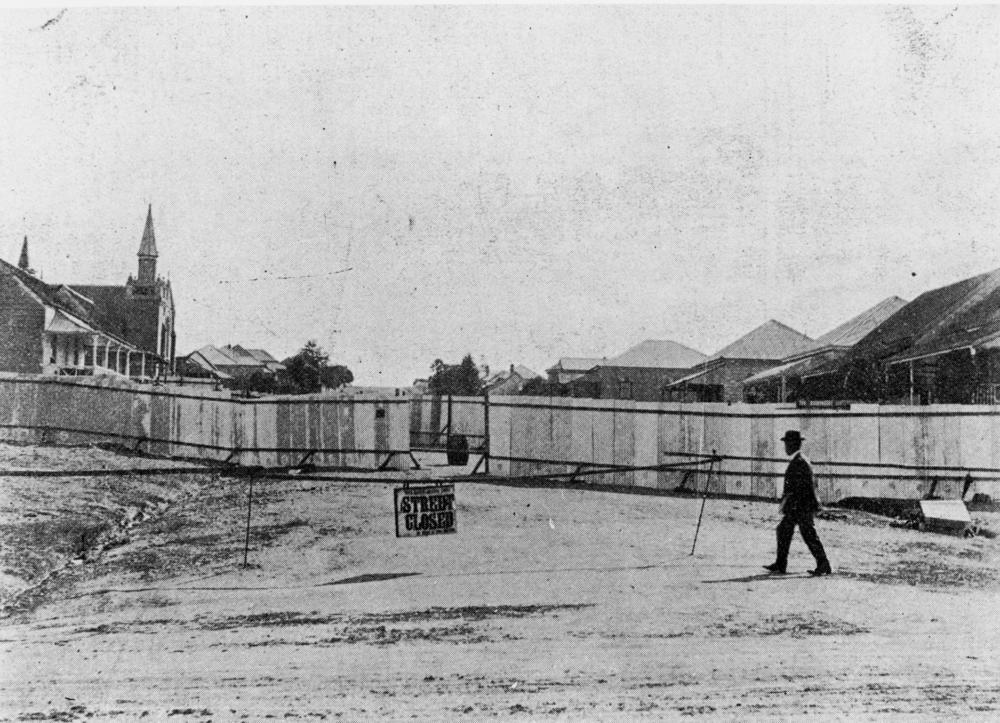
Quarantine barricade around houses in Hawthorne Street, Woolloongabba, Brisbane, Queensland, 1900

Parish life around the turn of the century was busy; there were services with large congregations (a record 154 communicants on Sunday 12 April 1903), weddings, social gatherings, concerts and activities such as amateur dramatics, debating and cricket and fund raising events.

However, on 28 April 1900, James Amos Drevesen (born 1879 – died 1954, Queensland), a 21 year old married man who worked carting produce from wharf to market, was diagnosed with Bubonic plague. He lived in a cottage at the lower part of Hawthorne Street, Woolloongabba. As authorities put in place quarantine measures, this street leading to Holy Trinity Woolloongabba was barricaded.

The year 1901 was notable for the death of Queen Victoria. Services of mourning, featuring black and purple, took place at Holy Trinity Woolloongabba.

In June 1906, a building fund was commenced to raise monies for a new and larger church building to accommodate Holy Trinity Woolloongabba's growing congregation.

In 1910, Edward VII died. The words of the Reverend D. J. Garland at the services of Sunday 8 May 1910 reflected the mood of the congregation. Garland said the King's death had "come with a suddenness which had been so shocking that it was impossible for anyone to speak calmly of the calamity which had befallen the Empire". Many of those present at the services were wearing mourning clothes. The Holy Trinity Women's Guild along with many other groups, delivered a wreath to the Brisbane mayoress at the town hall. Just one week later, Holy Trinity Woolloongabba celebrated the fortieth anniversary of its dedication.

=== World War I (1914–1918) ===
In the first months of the Great War little changed at Holy Trinity Woolloongabba: Sunday services, weddings, fetes and fundraising continued. In mid 1915, well after the start of the Gallipoli Campaign on 25 April 1915, St Clair George Alfred Donaldson (Dr Donaldson), first Archbishop of Brisbane, sermonised at Holy Trinity Woolloongabba on the nature of the Christian spirit in war. Soon, priests, including Cecil Edwards, were leaving Brisbane to become military chaplains. Parishes were being asked to release their chaplains to accompany soldiers on troopships on full pay. Proceeds of fundraising went to the war effort and parishes were holding send-offs for men and women who were enlisting.

By September 1918, some men were returning to the parish. The rector, Cecil Edwards returned in January 1920.

In the following year, the global influenza pandemic, known as the Spanish flu reached Brisbane. Holy Trinity Woolloongabba church hall was a meeting place for organisation of care in the emergency.

=== Fire of 1929 ===
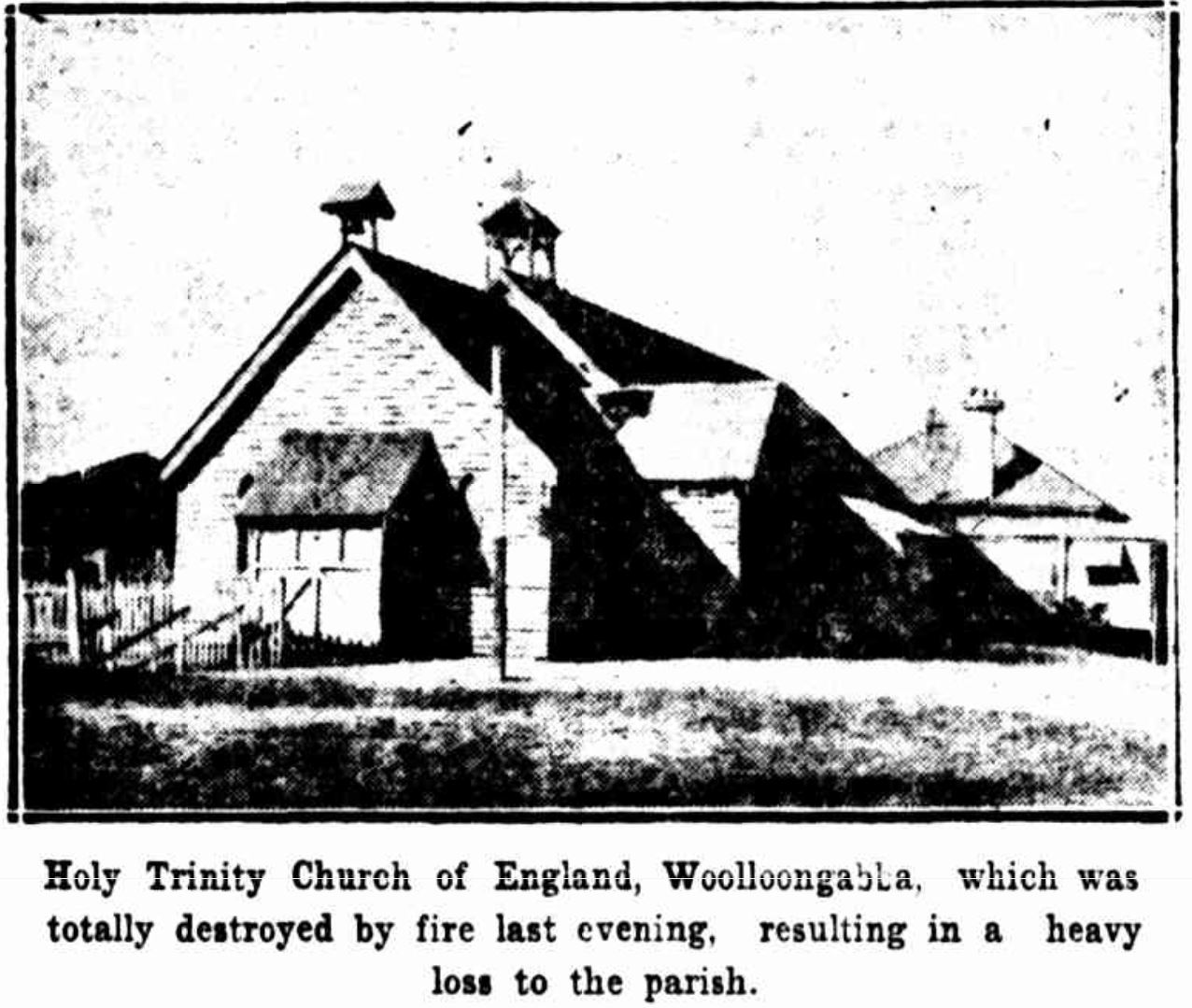
Church in 1929 before the fire

In the 1920s, fund raising for a new church building at Holy Trinity Woolloongabba recommenced with a system of long-term subscriptions. A target amount of £5,000 was set. However, on the evening of Wednesday 11 December 1929, the church was destroyed by fire. There were no injuries. The source of the fire was not apparent. The claim to the Diocesan Fire Insurance Fund was £1,019.

Gerald Sharp, Archbishop of Brisbane, lay the foundation stone of the new church on Sunday 2 May 1930. Building of the new church was completed in September 1930. Bishop Batty dedicated the new church on Saturday 4 October 1930. A dedication festival took place on Sunday 4 October 1931 in the presence of the archbishop, Dr Sharp.

In 1938, a basement columbarium with entry from steps from the southern facade below the vestry was added. It was the first of its kind in Queensland and probably in Australia. It measures 30 feet (9.1 m) by 26 feet (7.9 m) and houses 950 niches.

=== World War II (1939–1945) ===
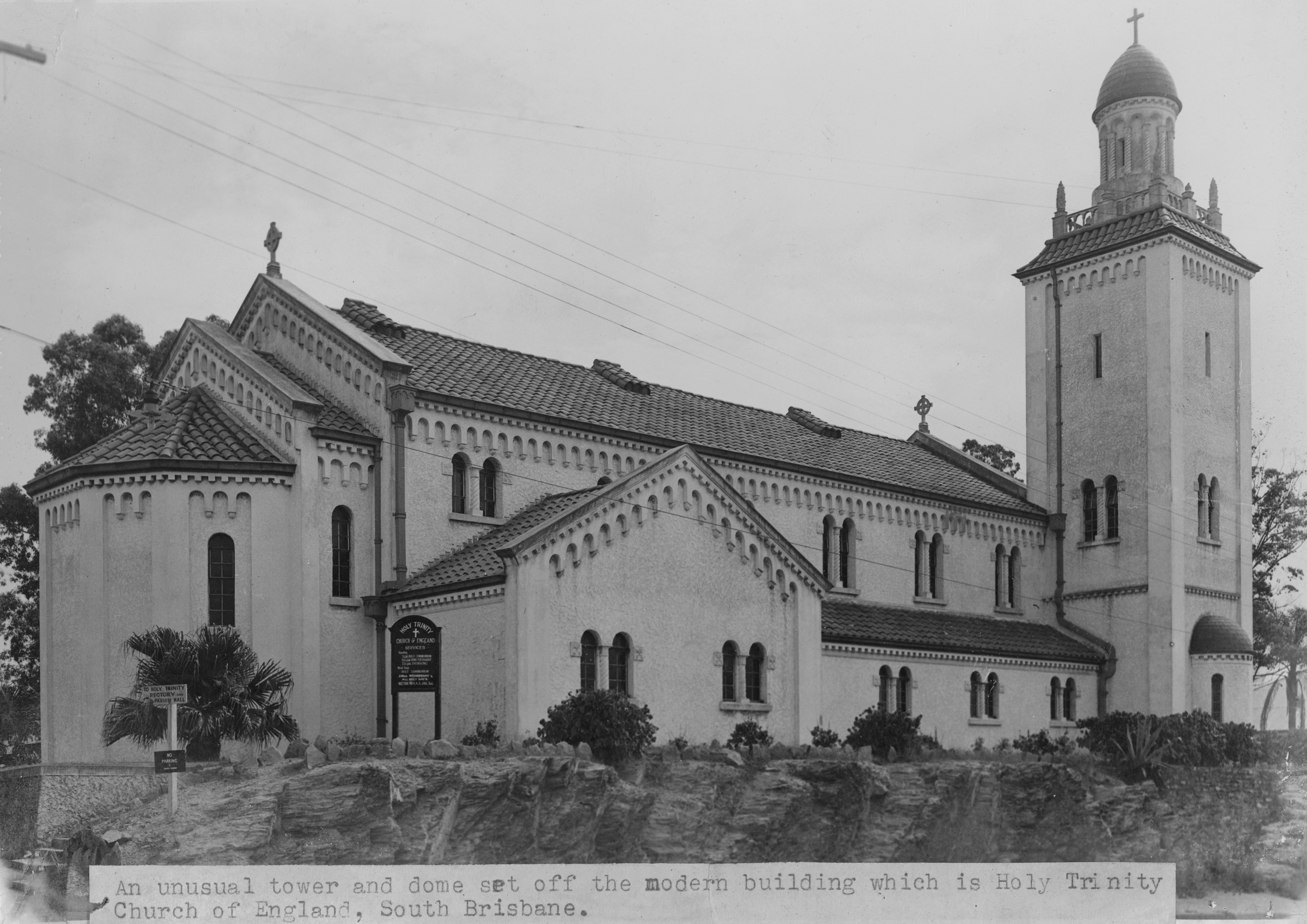
Holy Trinity Church of England, Woolloongabba, 1949

On Sunday 19 June 1949, a war memorial bell and belfry were dedicated at Holy Trinity Woolloongabba by Archbishop Halse. The bell is cast with a memorial inscription to those who fell in World War II and a thanksgiving for peace.

In April 1950, one of several bamboo crosses sent from Japan was placed in Holy Trinity Woolloongabba to symbolise Japanese repentance for the murder of Australian missionaries in Papua New Guinea during World War II. The crosses bear the hand written words of the Anglican Bishop of Tokyo, Light Maekawa, "Concerning God, repentance; Concerning man, reconciliation". The murders occurred at places such as Buna beach and in the sinking of the SS Montevideo Maru. The Martyrs of New Guinea are remembered on 2 September.

=== South East Freeway ===
In November 1972, the South East Freeway was opened. Its course bisected the Parish of Woolloongabba. Part of Hawthorne street was made a bridge over the freeway. This marked geographical and psychological watershed in the history of Holy Trinity Woolloongabba.

=== 2014 storm ===
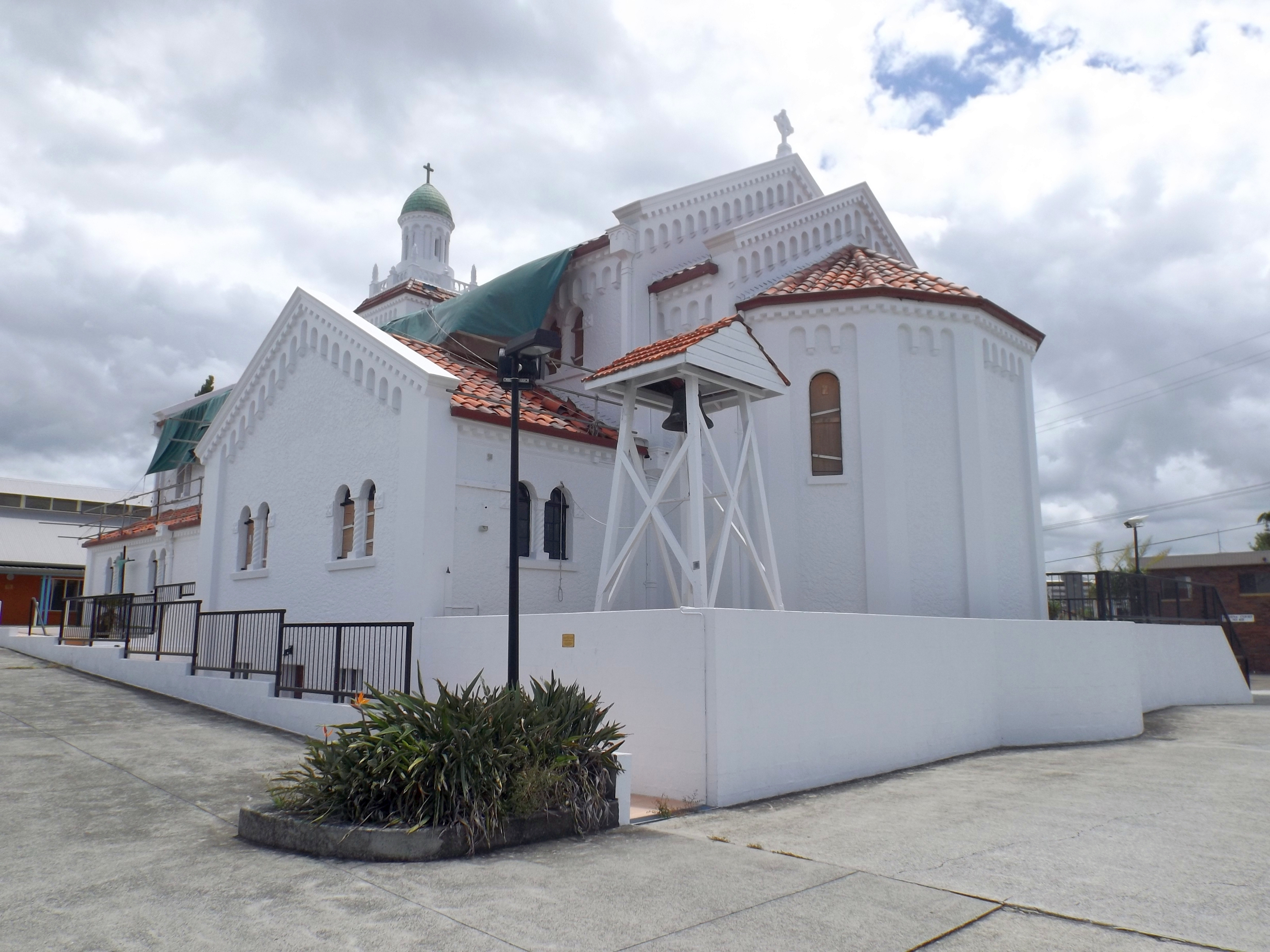
Hail damaged Holy Trinity Anglican Church, Woolloongabba

On 27 November 2014 the church was extensively damaged by the supercell Brisbane hailstorm which hit Woolloongabba from the south. There were large hailstones and strong winds. There was damage to the roof and the stained glass windows.

== Design and construction ==
The architectural design of the Holy Trinity Woolloongabba church building of 1930 demonstrates a late 1920s experiment into a hybrid of Romanesque and Spanish Mission architecture. Another such example is Holy Trinity Church in Mackay which was designed by Lange Powell.

The architects of the building were the firm Chambers and Ford of Brisbane (1920–1951). The firm was a partnership of Claude William Chambers and Eric Marshall Ford. The design was picked by a limited competition. Tenders were called by Chambers and Ford in the February 1930 edition of the Architects and Builders Journal of Queensland and in the May 1930 edition of the journal the tender of J. H. Davis was accepted. The final cost of the church was approximately £9,800.

The plan comprised a prominent tower, vestry, entrance porch and nave with side aisles and octagonal chancel. A basement was to provide access for a further two vestries. Finishes throughout the church included face brick internal walls with black tuckpointing, timber panelled ceilings and external roughcast render. A red tiled roof was to provide a contrast with the whitewashed external walls.

Electric lighting was installed by Dudley Winterford. The plasterwork was done by James Bain and Son; the glazing by the Decorative Art Company; and the leadlights by Exton and Company. The garden and landscaping was set out by H. Stokes. Many of the internal fittings were donated by parishioners and much of the fitted and loose furniture, including the altar furniture and pews was designed by Eric Ford. An organ by Messrs Whitehouse costing £560 was installed.

== External architectural plan ==
The Spanish Mission revival characteristics include the stucco external finish, terracotta cordova roof tiles, barley twist columns, and heavy timber joinery. The Romanesque details include raked arch motifs on the parapets, domed roofs, tower and round arched openings embellished with Norman detailing.

The church has a traditional cruciform floor plan, with shallow transepts, an octagonal chancel at the eastern end and a dominant tower projecting from the north western corner. The body of the church is divided into a nave with a gabled roof abutted on the northern and southern sides by skillion roofed aisles, creating a high level clerestory. The transepts are formed by gabled abutments to the principal roof and the eastern end of the roof is separated from the principal by a secondary gabled parapet from which an octagonal hipped section roofs the chancel.

=== Corner tower ===
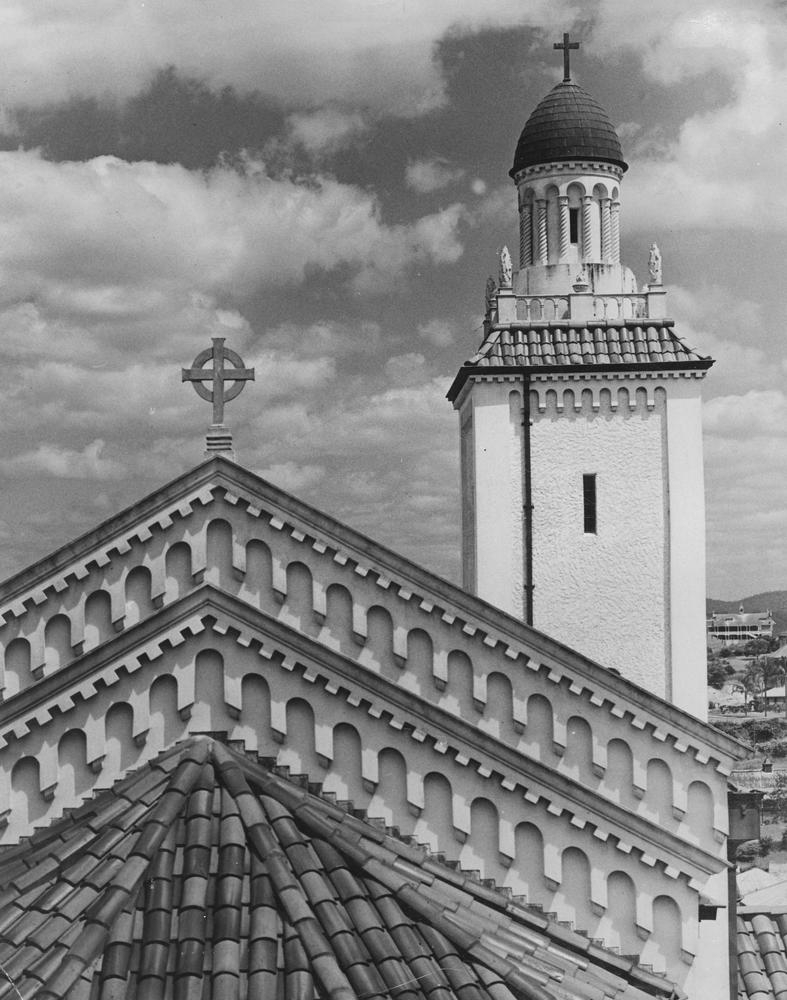
Roof and corner tower, March 1938

The corner tower stands about three storeys or 75 feet (23 m) above ground level. At the base of the tower, on the northern face is a one storeyed semicircular projection, with a half dome roof clad with painted copper tiles. The tower has a square plan through to the second floor level. It then tapers inward to form a platform.

The platform is surmounted by a circular lantern. Surrounding the lantern is an elaborate concrete balustrade featuring large flames at the four corners. Floodlighting, concealed by the balustrade, illuminates the lantern at night. The lantern comprises a colonnaded exterior which supports a pointed dome roof. The dome roof of the lantern is clad with copper tiles and surmounted by a Latin cross.

The faces of the tower feature double round arched openings separated by twisted columns on the first floor and thin slit windows on the floor above. A repeated arched moulding forms a cornice mould around the top of the second floor of the tower

The principal entrance to the tower is from the western face. There is a double timber door, flanked by twisted columns. The door is surrounded by an archway in relief plasterwork featuring moulded panels of two alternating types of crosses. Within the base of the tower is a curved cantilevered concrete stairway which gives access to the upper levels.

=== Western facade ===
The western facade of the church houses two entrances, the principal entrance to the body of the church and the entrance to the base of the tower. The principal entrance to the church is via a centrally located double timber door with circular motifs on each of five panels on the exterior aspect. The door is protected by a small open porch, which has a gabled awning clad with cordova tiles and a vaulted concrete soffit supported on substantial columns with Composite order capitals.

On the fascia and surrounding the round archway is a relief moulding featuring crosses. Flanking the entrance are two shallow pilasters which divide the facade into three bays. Within the central bay, above the entrance, is a row of six round arched window openings divided by thin twisted columns and glazed with coloured glass leadlights. Above this is a large wheel window again featuring brightly coloured glazing. The parapeted gable is lined at cornice level with a repeated arch moulding aligned with the taper of the gable. Surmounting the apex of the gable is a cross.

=== Northern and southern facades ===
The side aisles of the northern and southern facades of the building are lined with paired round arched openings divided by twisted columns with Composite order capitals and flanked by panels with dog tooth mouldings. These openings define the internal bays of the nave and are glazed with figured stained glass panels. The windows throughout the church are steel casements. Above the height of the side aisles are taller paired round arched openings aligned with the lower windows, but glazed with two tones of green leadlighting. Above the windows is a cornice formed by the repeated arch moulding. In 1971, a freestanding crucifix was erected on the southern side of the church commemorating Eric Johnstone. Also apparent on the southern elevation is the semi-basement housing the coumbarium under the southern transept.

=== Eastern facade ===
The eastern end of the church features a number of single round arched openings glazed with stained glass panels. The repeated arch moulding is used as a cornice moulding on the octagonal chancel and raked on the two parapeted gables.

== Internal architectural features ==
Generally, the interior of the church is quite dark and heavy. The internal walls of the church are all dark face brickwork with black pointing. The joinery is heavy and the small openings are mostly glazed with coloured glass. There is early electrical lighting within the church in the form of pendants in the nave and wall brackets along the walls of the side aisles.

Within the walls, the body of the church is divided into a six bay nave and side aisles. The side aisles are formed by two heavy brick faced arcades. They comprise compound columns supporting six round arched openings. The compound columns are capped with white painted concrete capitals embellished with mouldings of foliage. The side aisles are further divided by round archways defining each of the bays of the nave and springing from the compound columns of the principal arcades.

Also demarcating the six internal bays are a number of heavy, dark stained timber, scissor roof trusses. They are supported on white painted concrete corbels with simple mouldings. The ceiling of the church is lined with stained pine rafters. Between the rafters are infill panels of timber based board, like an early coarse particle board.

The flooring throughout the interior is concrete which has been scoured to resemble flagging stones. The concrete has been treated with a light buff colour in areas forming patterns. Symbols for alpha and omega, are inscribed in the concrete floor in the steps to the sanctuary area.

The transepts of the church are formed by projections aligned with the two most easterly bays of the nave. Housed in the northern facing chancel is the Weedon Memorial Chapel. It is separated from the church by a face brick balustrade. Housed in the chancel on the southern side of the church is a vestry and organ case. The vestry is formed by dark stained timber panelling with cross bracing. Aligned with the transepts in the nave is a choir area, separated from the body of the church by stepped platforms.

The sanctuary in the chancel is demarcated by two adjacent round chancel arches. (These arches are defined externally by the two parapeted gable ends.) Between the two chancel arches is a recessed bay housing round arched openings. Altar rails are aligned with the forward chancel arch. The ceiling of the chancel follows the hipped roof line and is clad with a concrete render. The sanctuary has a number of stepped platforms, and on the uppermost platform is a timber altar. Also in the sanctuary area are two early patterned stained glass panels in round arched openings within the raked walls behind the altar.

A large concrete pulpit, to which access is provided by three steps, is found in the choir section of the church and is decorated in the manner of the exterior of the building, painted white and featuring the repeated arch moulding as a cornice. A sandstone baptismal font is elevated on small platforms in the south western corner of the church.

== Other buildings in the church grounds ==
In 1956 after the original rectory was destroyed the church acquired an adjoining property with an early house from the Sawyer family. This building became the rectory.
