= George Frodsham =

Minister of religion

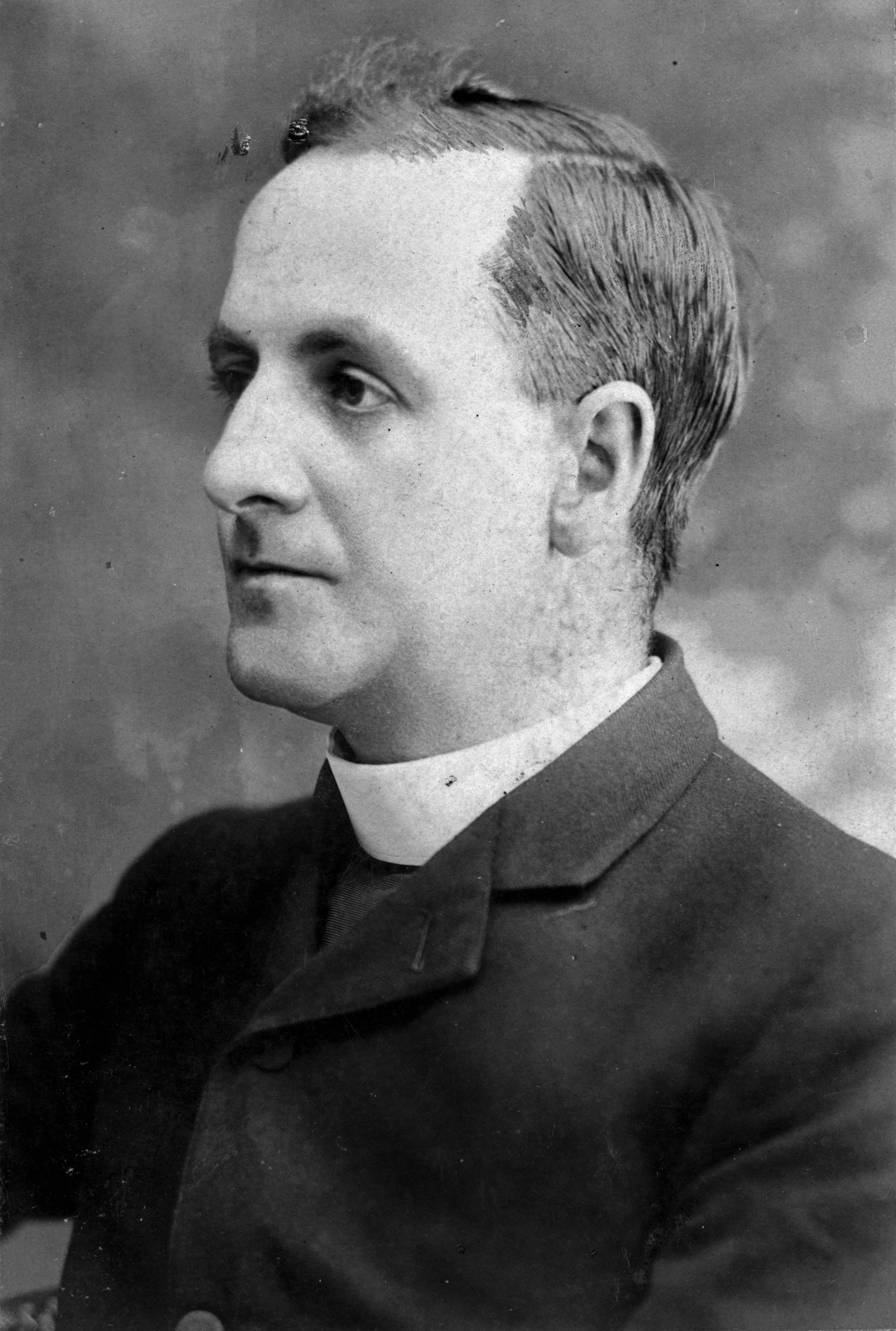
Bishop George Horsfall Frodsham

George Horsfall Frodsham (1863–1937) was an English-born Anglican priest. From 1902 to 1913 he was the Bishop of North Queensland in Australia.

== Early life ==
Frodsham was born in Sale Moor, Cheshire, England on 14 September 1863, the son of James Frodsham and his wife Jane (née Horsfall). He was educated at Birkenhead School and University College, Durham.

== Religious life ==
Frodsham trained for ordination at St Aidan's College, Birkenhead and was ordained both deacon and priest in 1889. His first positions were curacies at St Thomas' Leeds and St Margaret's Ilkley.

From 1896 he was Rector of St Thomas’ in Toowong, Brisbane, Queensland and then chaplain to the Bishop of Brisbane. In 1902 it was announced that he would become Bishop of North Queensland, and he was consecrated as such on 17 August 1902 at St Andrew's Cathedral, Sydney, by Archbishop Saumarez Smith. He served as bishop until 1913.

Frodsham served as a military chaplain from 1899 to 1910, and later again in 1922, the senior chaplain to the Northern Command of the British Army.

Whilst in Townsville, he was passionate in founding an Australian Institute of Tropical Medicine facility.

On his return to England he was a canon residentiary at Gloucester Cathedral. In 1920 he became vicar of Halifax, West Yorkshire, a position he held until his death.

== Later life ==
Frodsham died in Halifax on 6 March 1937.

Religious titles
| Preceded by Christopher George Barlow | Bishop of North Queensland; 1902 –1913 | Succeeded by John Oliver Feetham |
