= Jim Leftwich =

Australian anglican bishop

James Randolph Leftwich (1944 - 27 January 2020) was the national Aboriginal bishop of the Anglican Church of Australia, licensed as an assistant bishop in the Diocese of North Queensland.

Leftwich was educated at Nungalinya College and Wontulp-bi-Buya College, and was ordained deacon in 1987 and priest in 1988.

Leftwich served as bishop to the Aborigine peoples of northern Queensland and all Australia from his consecration on 16 September 2001 until his retirement on 31 December 2010.

He died in 2020.
