= Ted Mosby (bishop) =

Australian Anglican bishop (1949–2000)

Morrison Ted Mosby (2 February 1949 – 17 March 2000) was an Australian Anglican Torres Strait Islander bishop. He served as assistant bishop in the Anglican Diocese of North Queensland from 29 September 1997 until his death on 17 March 2000.

Mosby trained for ordination at St John's College, Morpeth. Made a deacon in 1981 and ordained priest the following year (both times at All Souls' and St Bartholomew's Cathedral, Thursday Island of the Diocese of Carpentaria), he served his entire ministry in those islands and the Cape York Peninsula, becoming incumbent of the Cathedral parish of Thursday Island. He opposed the reunion of Carpentaria diocese with North Queensland in 1996, but nonetheless accepted appointment as assistant Bishop of the Torres Strait Region the following year. He was consecrated a bishop on 29 September 1997; controversy followed, because most of the Anglicans of the islands wished to be a separate diocese, and because the area's governing body objected to Mosby's appointment.
