= John Lewis (bishop of North Queensland) =

Australian Anglican bishop (1926–2015)

- Bishop of North Queensland
- Diocese: North Queensland
- Installed: 1971
- Term ended: 1996
- Predecessor: Ian Shevill
- Successor: Clyde Wood

Orders
- Ordination: 1951
- Consecration: 1971

Personal details
- Born: Hurtle John Lewis; 2 January 1926 Adelaide, South Australia, Australia
- Died: 22 December 2015 (aged 89) Adelaide, South Australia, Australia
- Military career
- Allegiance: Australia
- Branch: Royal Australian Navy
- Unit: HMAS Ararat

Hurtle John Lewis AM (2 January 1926 – 22 December 2015) was an Australian Anglican bishop.

Lewis was born in Adelaide, the son of a kangaroo shooter. He was educated at Prince Alfred College and the University of London. After World War II service with the Royal Australian Navy he trained for ordination at St Michael's House, Crafers. He was ordained both deacon and priest in 1951. He then held various positions in the Society of the Sacred Mission until he became Bishop of North Queensland in 1971, a position he held until 1996. He was consecrated a bishop on 2 February 1971 at St John's Cathedral (Brisbane) and retired effective 2 January 1996.

Lewis died on 22 December 2015 in Adelaide.

Religious titles
Preceded by Ian Shevill	Bishop of North Queensland; 1971 –1996	Succeeded by Clyde Wood
