= Anglican Diocese of North Queensland =

Diocese of the Anglican Church of Australia

Diocese of North Queensland
- Coat of arms

Location
- Country: Australia
- Territory: North Queensland; Far North Queensland; Mackay, Isaac & Whitsunday; (Northern part)
- Ecclesiastical province: Queensland
- Metropolitan: Archbishop of Brisbane
- Headquarters: St James' Place; Level 1, 155-157 Denham Street; Townsville Q 4810

Information
- Denomination: Anglican
- Rite: Book of Common Prayer; An Australian Prayer Book; A Prayer Book for Australia
- Established: 1879
- Cathedral: St James' Cathedral, Townsville
- Language: English

Current leadership
- Parent church: Anglican Church of Australia
- Bishop: Keith Joseph; (since 2019)
- Dean: Kenneth Lay; (since 2020)

Website
- Diocese of North Queensland

The Diocese of North Queensland is a diocese of the Anglican Church of Australia, founded in 1879. It is situated in the northern part of the state of Queensland, Australia. As part of the Province of Queensland, it covers the Torres Strait Islands in the north, the entire Cape York Peninsula and the cities of Mount Isa, Cairns, Townsville and Mackay. The diocesan cathedral is St James' Cathedral, Townsville. The Bishop of North Queensland is Keith Ronald Joseph, who was consecrated and installed on 31 March 2019.

== Structure ==
There are 54 parishes in the diocese, supported by 120 licensed clergy as of February 2015. The diocese owns and operates St Mark's College, a residential college for men and women at James Cook University, Townsville.

The diocese extends its pastoral care through the following ministries:

- Anglicare North Queensland
- The Good Shepherd Nursing Home, Townsville (co-trustee)
- The Good Shepherd Lodge (Aged Persons Home), Mackay

The Diocese of North Queensland supports of Wontulp-bi-Buya College in Cairns which specialises in indigenous adult education including theological studies. This college is an ecumenical venture and is the Queensland partner of Nungalinya College, Darwin.

The Bishop of North Queensland is Keith Ronald Joseph, who was consecrated and installed on 31 March 2019.

== History ==
=== Early history of the diocese ===
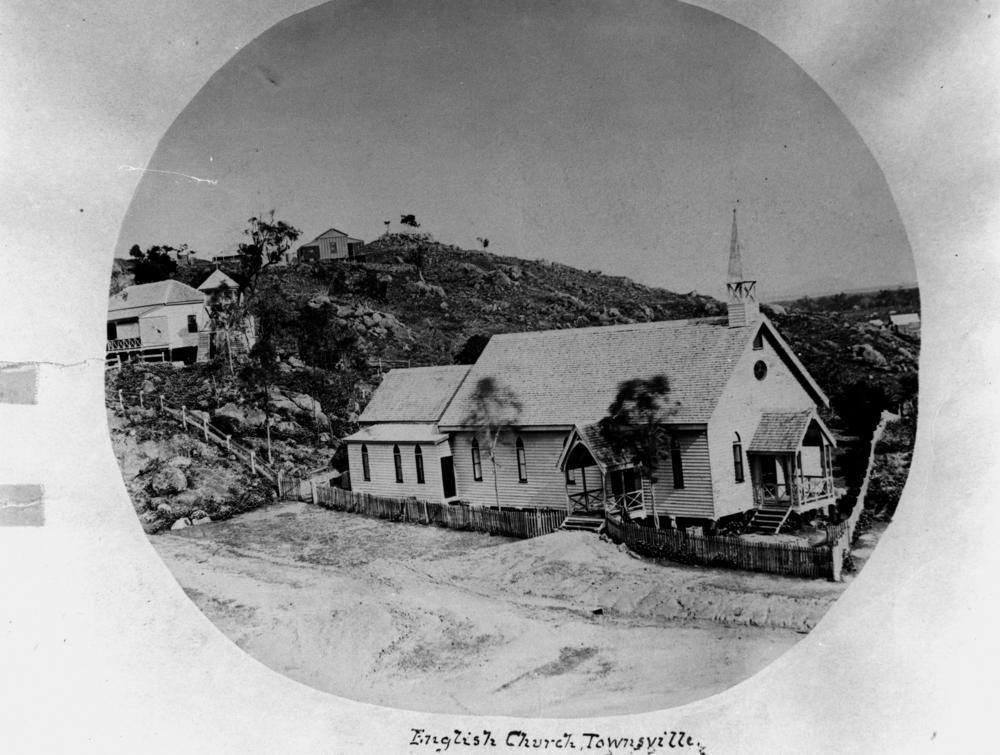
St James Church, c.1875

Prior to the establishment of the Diocese of North Queensland, the Anglican Diocese of Sydney had responsibility for all areas of Australia outside a diocese.

The Anglican Church commenced its ministry in the region in 1870 with the arrival in Townsville of James Adams, newly graduated from Moore Theological College in Sydney. As there were no church building in Townsville, services were conducted in the Townsville Court House until Adams could arrange for a church to be constructed.

The Diocese of North Queensland was established in 1879 from that part of the Diocese of Sydney lying north of 22°S latitude in the State of Queensland. In 1900 the Diocese of Carpentaria was formed from part of the northern area of the diocese, but in 1996 this action was reversed.

=== 2018–present ===
On 24 November 2018, Keith Joseph was elected as the next Bishop of North Queensland following the retirement of Bill Ray. On 31 March 2019, he was consecrated and enthroned as Bishop in St James' Cathedral, Townsville.

By 2025, the diocese was severely financially troubled. In May of that year, Joseph told ABC News that the diocese would need to find about A$8 million to pay victims of child sexual abuse under the National Redress Scheme. The bishop said that none of the abuse had occurred in the past 25 years. Most had been in the 1960s to 1980s. On 22 August 2025, the diocese obtained an order of the Supreme Court of Queensland appointing receivers to all its assets. In seeking that order, the diocese had been hoping that a financial restructure would allow it to sell assets; the diocese had not defaulted on any payments to any victims of child sex abuse.

The receivers, SV Partners directors Michael Brennan and David Stimpson, later increased to A$11 million the estimate of the amount the diocese required to meet its National Redress Scheme obligations.

On 19 February 2026, the Supreme Court made an order authorising the diocese to sell church properties to help meet its commitments to historical sexual abuse victims. Justice Christopher Johnstone was satisfied the evidence suggested that "without the sale of the assets to meet ongoing financial obligations, the diocese will be insolvent by May of this year." According to ABC News:

"Mr Brennan said the first phase of the sale would involve 11 properties, primarily made up of rectories but also including churches at Mount Isa, Magnetic Island and two in the Townsville suburbs of Belgian Gardens and South Townsville."

The receiver also hoped the restructure would be a blueprint for other organisations facing similar difficulties.

== Bishops ==
Bishops of North Queensland
No	From	Until	Incumbent	Notes
1	1878	1891	George Stanton	
2	1891	1902	Christopher Barlow	Bishop of Goulburn (1902–1915)
3	1902	1913	George Frodsham	
4	1913	1947	John Feetham	later canonised as St John Oliver Feetham
5	1947	1952	Wilfrid Belcher	
6	1953	1970	Ian Shevill	Afterwards Bishop of Newcastle
7	1971	1996	John Lewis	Previously with the Society of the Sacred Mission
8	1996	2002	Clyde Wood	previously Bishop of the Northern Territory
9	2002	2007	John Noble	
10	2007	2018	Bill Ray	
11	2019	present	Keith Joseph	Previously Dean of Darwin

== Assistant bishops ==
=== Assistant bishops serving the Aboriginal people ===
- Arthur Malcolm (bishop 1985–2000)
- Jim Leftwich (bishop 2001–2010)

=== Assistant bishops serving the Torres Strait Islander people ===
- Ted Mosby (bishop 1997–2000)
- Saibo Mabo (bishop 2002–2015)

=== Other assistant bishops ===
- Grosvenor Miles, who had been assistant bishop of Madagascar from 1938 to 1960, was assistant bishop of North Queensland from 1962 to his death in 1978. His ashes are interred under the High Altar of St James' Cathedral, Townsville.
- George Tung Yep: on 12 October 1985, John Grindrod, Archbishop of Brisbane consecrated George Tung Yep (hitherto archdeacon) and Arthur Malcolm (Arthur Alistair Malcolm CA; hitherto a canon) assistant bishops of the diocese. Tung Yep was ordained on 10 February 1955, and was appointed regional bishop in 1988.
- Ian Stuart served as an Assistant Bishop of North Queensland from his 1992 consecration until 1998, during which time he was also, in a vacancy in the diocesan See, Bishop Administrator.
