= Bill Ray (bishop) =

Australian bishop

William James Ray is an Australian retired bishop. He was the tenth Anglican bishop of North Queensland in Australia. He was consecrated a bishop in March 2007 and installed as the 10th bishop of North Queensland on 24 March 2007. He retired as Bishop of North Queensland on 21 September 2018.

Born in country Victoria, Ray went to teachers college and began life as a primary school teacher, soon becoming head teacher of a rural school. In his young adult years he led a scout troop, contributed to diocesan committees such as the Camp and Conference committee, lead several camps, represented the Diocese of Gippsland on the General Board of Religious Education (GBRE) and studied theology by distance education. During this time he held a lay reader's license, often taking services of Morning and Evening Prayer in the Parish of Yarram.

From 1978 to 1981, Ray worked full-time with the young people of the Diocese of Brisbane, offering Bible studies, camps for various ages and assistance with youth groups, as well as providing training for Sunday school and religious education teachers and youth leaders. He also continued his involvement with GBRE. His ministry as youth and children's worker in the parish of St Luke's Toowoomba from late 1981 to 1986, was punctuated by two years at Duke University in North Carolina, where he studied for his Master of Religious Education. He moved back to Victoria at the beginning of 1987 to be the education officer for the Diocese of Gippsland and the regional officer for the Council for Christian Education in Schools.

Ray was ordained a deacon in Rockhampton in 1992 during the first few weeks of his five-year ministry as diocesan ministry training officer. He was ordained a priest later that year. He served as a parish priest in the parishes of Wandal (Rockhampton), East Ivanhoe and Croydon (Melbourne) and as Archdeacon of Maroondah (outer eastern suburbs of Melbourne).

Over the life of his full-time ministry, Ray has had an active role in the Education for Ministry (EFM) programs at various levels from national trainer, to regional co-ordinator as well as a group mentor. He is also a proponent of the catechumenate program and has led this at both the parish and diocesan levels. He became the director of GBRE in 2000, being equipped for this position over the years through his membership of the board, the executive and positions on various editorial committees. He has written a number of religious education programs and in recent years authored three Lenten study booklets.

Ray holds a Diploma of Teaching from Frankston Teachers' College; a Bachelor of Education from the Western Australian College of Education; a Licentiate of Theology from the Australian College of Theology and a Master of Religious Education from Duke University in the United States.
