= Wilfrid Belcher =

Wilfrid Bernard Belcher MC, (25 July 1891 – 28 January 1963) was an Anglican bishop in the mid 20th century.

== Early life ==
Belcher was educated at King's School, Bruton and Keble College, Oxford, the son of William Henry Belcher, a Newbury solicitor and his wife, Mary.

== Religious life ==
Belcher was ordained in 1922. His early career was spent with the Bush Brotherhood in Australia. He held incumbencies at Rickmansworth, Cheshunt and Durban before being appointed Bishop of North Queensland in 1947, a post he held for five years. He was consecrated a bishop on 15 February 1948. After this he was Rector of Diss and Assistant Bishop of Norwich, then Vicar of York cum Ravensworth in Natal. His last post was that of Rector of Ovington, Hampshire.

== Later life ==
He died on 28 January 1963.

Religious titles
Preceded by John Oliver Feetham	Bishop of North Queensland; 1947–1952	Succeeded by Ian Wotton Allnutt Shevill
