= Arthur Malcolm =

Australian bishop (1934–2022)

Alistair Arthur Malcolm (1934 – 29 July 2022) was the first Aboriginal bishop in the Anglican Church of Australia, licensed as an assistant bishop in the Diocese of North Queensland.

Born in Yarrabah, Queensland, and ordained a priest in 1978, Malcolm was consecrated on 12 October 1985 at Townsville and served as bishop to the Indigenous peoples of northern Queensland until his retirement in 2000.

Malcolm and his wife Colleen wrote the Prayer for Reconciliation in A Prayer Book for Australia (1995).

Malcolm died on 29 July 2022 in Edmonton, Cairns, at the age of 87.
