= Nungalinya College =

Adult education college in Casuarina, Darwin, Australia

Coordinates: 12°22′22″S 130°52′50″E

Nungalinya College is an adult education college based in Casuarina, a suburb of Darwin in the Northern Territory of Australia. Founded in 1973, it describes itself as a "Combined Churches Training College for Indigenous Australians", and provides training for Christian ministers and community leadership.

== History ==
"Nungalinya" is a Larrakia word used by the local Larrakia people word, referring to "Old Man Rock", a reef off Casuarina Beach, that was a traditional place of learning for young men. After the name was suggested by a group of Larrakia people, it was agreed to by a meeting of Trustees in 1973. On 4 August 1974, Archbishop Sir Frank Woods, the Anglican Primate of Australia, laid the foundation stone, a large round granite rock from the Mount Bundey mines.

== Description ==
It is managed by a partnership of the Anglican, Roman Catholic and Uniting Church, and is supported by other churches as well as Aboriginal and Torres Strait Islander communities. It provides training for Indigenous people throughout Australia, as well as cross-cultural awareness courses for non-Indigenous people.

The College offers courses designed for Aboriginal and Torres Strait Islander people approaches to life and learning, including courses in Christian theology at Certificate and Associate Diploma level, and Advanced Diploma in Ministry. It aims to "train men and women for leadership roles in churches and communities, and in exploring the Bible and Christian faith contextually", as well as teaching family members to learn about and participate in the wider community while strengthening their own Indigenous identity.

It is a nationally accredited registered training organisation, a private provider of Vocational education and Training and conducts TAFE accredited courses. In December 1998 it achieved the national status of a Quality Endorsed Training Organisation. It has a large campus with boarding facilities, set on 10 acres (4.0 ha).

It offers flexible learning options, combining distance education with intensive spells on-campus.

It is associated with a number of regional colleges, such as "Wontulp-Bi-Buya College" in Cairns, Queensland and "Training Aboriginal Christian Leaders" (TACL) an inter-Church organisation based in Adelaide with the Nungalinya Room, on the Adelaide College of Divinity campus.

== Courses ==
As of 2019:

- Certificate I–II Foundation Studies
- Certificate II in Media and Discipleship
- Certificate III-IV in Christian Ministry and Theology
- Diploma of Translating

== Notable alumni ==
- Djalu Gurruwiwi, player, maker and senior custodian of the yiḏaki and elder of the Gälpu clan of the Yolngu people, completed Theology studies in 1994.
