= St James' Cathedral, Townsville =

St James' Cathedral
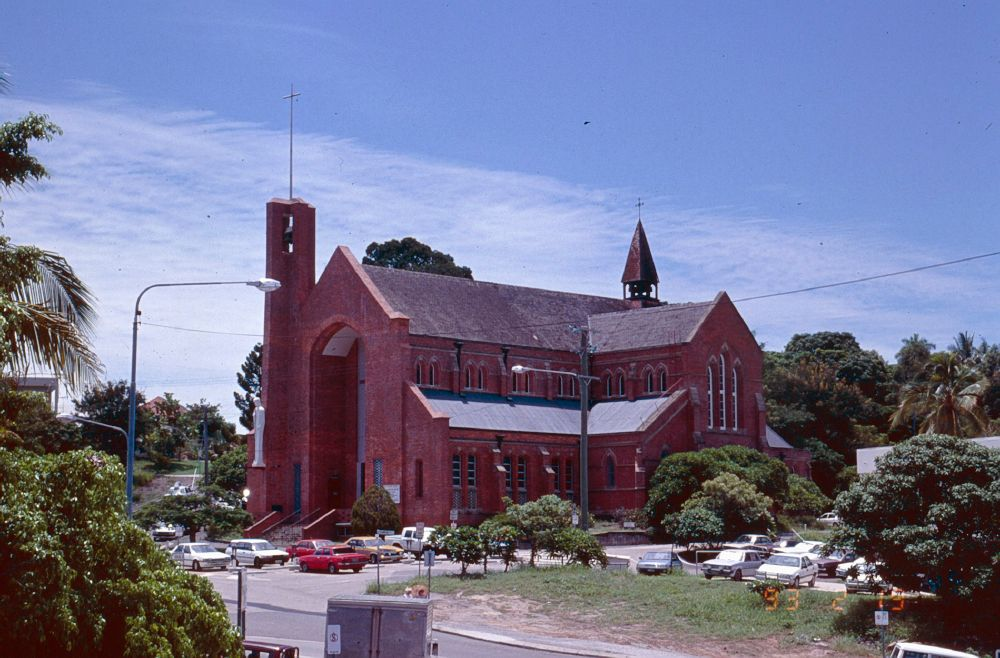
- St James' Cathedral, 1993
- St James' Cathedral
- 19°15′20″S 146°49′00″E
- Address: 36 Cleveland Terrace, Townsville, City of Townsville, Queensland
- Country: Australia
- Denomination: Anglican Church of Australia
- Website: stjamescathedral.com.au

History
- Status: Cathedral
- Founded: 27 June 1887
- Founder: Bishop George Henry Stanton
- Consecrated: 27 October 1892 by Bishop Christopher Barlow

Architecture
- Functional status: Active
- Architects: Arthur Blacket; Walter Morris Eyre; Louis Williams; Black and Paulsen
- Architectural type: Church
- Style: Gothic Revival
- Years built: 1887–1960

Specifications
- Materials: Red brick

Administration
- Diocese: North Queensland

Clergy
- Bishop: Keith Joseph
- Dean: Kenneth Lay

Queensland Heritage Register
- Official name: St James Cathedral
- Type: State heritage (built)
- Designated: 21 October 1992
- Reference no.: 600887
- Significant period: 1880s, 1950s (historical); 1880s, 1950s (fabric) ongoing (social)
- Significant components: Tower – bell / belfry, apse, cathedral, views to, stained glass window/s
- Builders: MacMahon & Cliffe

St James' Cathedral is a heritage-listed cathedral of the Anglican Diocese of North Queensland at 36 Cleveland Terrace, Townsville, City of Townsville, Queensland, Australia. It was designed by Arthur Blacket and was built in 1887 by MacMahon & Cliffe. It was added to the Queensland Heritage Register on 21 October 1992.

Built atop Melton Hill, the large red-brick structure is a well-known landmark of the Townsville central business district.

== History ==
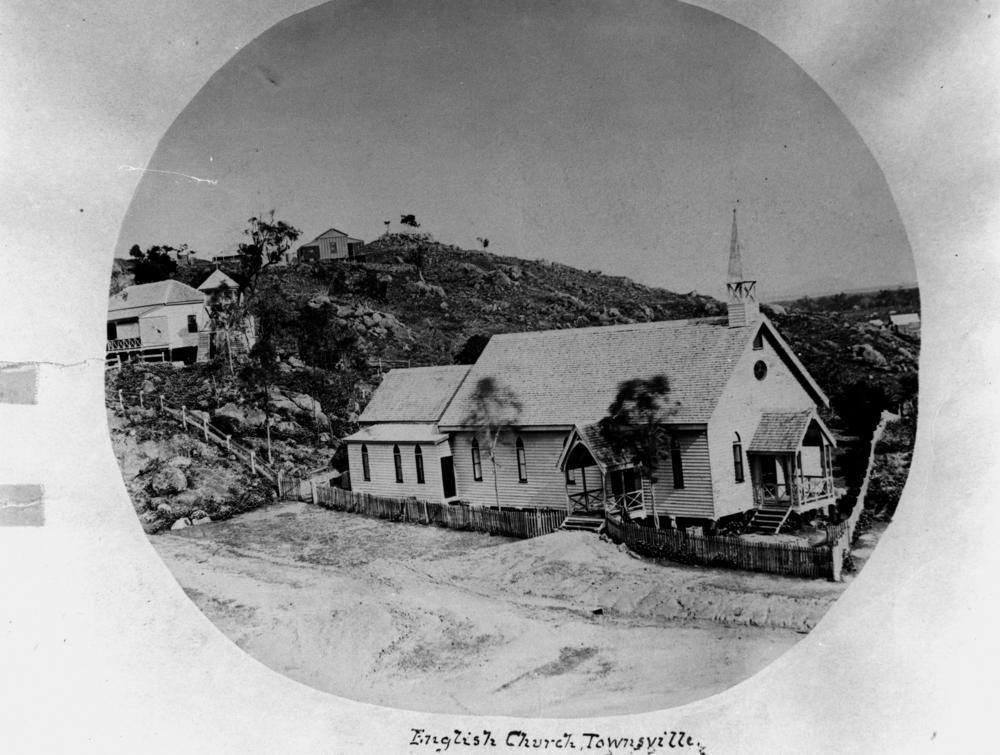
St James' Church, c 1875

St James Cathedral was erected in two stages, 1887–1892 and 1959–1960, for the Anglican Diocese of North Queensland.

Prior to the construction of a church, Anglican services in Townsville were conducted at the court house.

The first Anglican church was established on Melton Hill, purchased with the aid of parishioners at a sale of crown lands and work began on the on 24 May 1871. The structure was constructed of weatherboard with a shingle roof.

When Townsville was established in the mid-1860s, its Anglican parishioners were part of the Diocese of Sydney. In 1878 the diocese of North Queensland was created, based at St James' Church in Townsville. The new diocese's first bishop George Henry Stanton was appointed on 24 June 1878. Stanton did not immediately go to Townsville but spent several months in England, trying to raise funds and attract clergy for the new diocese. He finally arrived in Townsville in May 1879, preaching his first service on 21 May 1879. Having become the cathedral of the new diocese, St James' Church was enlarged, extending the nave and north and south aisles in 1880 and an organ, donated by a Miss SE Holland (an English friend of Bishop Stanton), was added to the church in 1884.

Plans for a new and larger cathedral began on 5 August 1883 when members of the church formed a committee to raise the funds. The proposal to build a cathedral was approved by a church synod in 1884 and the Cathedral Building Committee was appointed. The intention initially was to have the cathedral designed by John Horbury Hunt. However, in 1885, Arthur Blacket of Sydney, son of Edmund Blacket (he New South Wales colonial architect) was commissioned to design a building to be erected on the church land behind the existing weatherboard structure. The initial designs called for a cathedral constructed of sandstone with granite columns which would hold 1000 parishioners. The nave would be 37 feet (11 m) wide, transepts would be 24 feet (7.3 m) wide and the total interior length from chancel to bell tower would be 115 feet (35 m). Many features of these designs were rejected upon review by the diocese and three revisions were necessary before a final plan was approved. The final design was for a church built in stone, with a low wide central tower which would act as a ventilation shaft, and a single tower at the northern door. It was to cost £24,000, but would be built in sections.

Early in 1887 the diocese called for tenders for the construction of the cathedral. The foundation stone was laid on the Golden Jubilee of Queen Victoria on 27 June 1887, and the building was erected by Townsville contractors MacMahon & Cliffe. Subsequent financial constraints forced changes to the design, and the cathedral was constructed in brick, with concrete facings, a temporary roof and no towers.

With the completion of the building's foundations in November 1887, building work stalled due to a lack of funding. Following protracted dispute between the Sydney architect and the church building committee, Arthur Blacket's services were dispensed with in 1890. Work resumed in 1891 with the Townsville architect Walter Morris Eyre to oversee the final stages of construction; Eyre had been acting as supervising architect since the commencement of building. In order to reduce the cost of the structure the original plans to construct the building of sandstone were revised and the building was constructed of red brick with concrete taking the place of marble and granite.

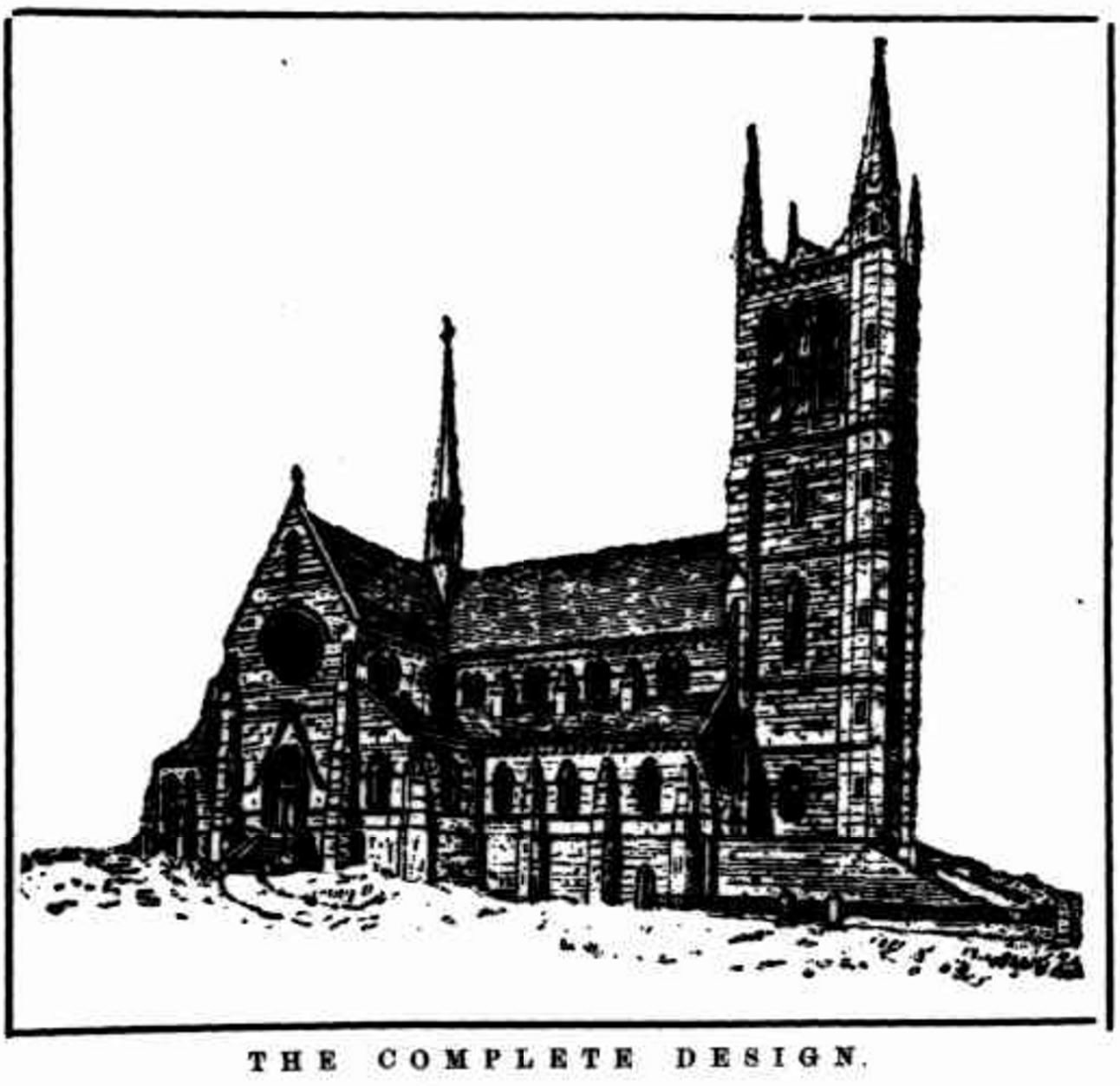
Intended design for the completed St James' Cathedral, as at 1892

Due to the lack of funding the decision was made to only construct half of the cathedral, with the other half to be completed at a later date. The apse, chancel, transepts and part of the nave and flanking arcades were built with a temporary roof constructed overhead. In 1892 the pipe organ was moved from the church to the new cathedral. This first stage of the cathedral was consecrated on 27 October 1892 by the second Bishop of North Queensland, Christopher Barlow. Although invited, Bishop Stanton was unable to attend.

On 26 January 1896, Cyclone Sigma struck Townsville; however, the cathedral was relatively unaffected by this.

Between 1900 and 1902 a second organ was purchased from North Ward, and the two were coupled together until rebuilt as one instrument in 1958.

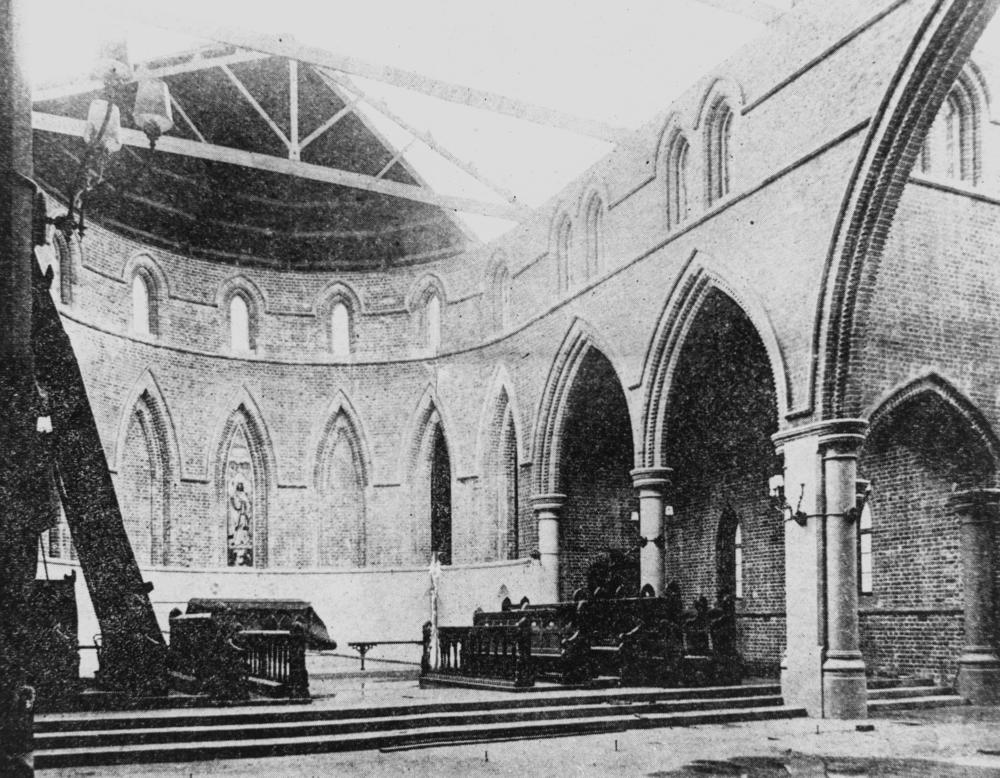
Storm damage, 1903

On 9 March 1903 Cyclone Leonta struck Townsville, destroying the 1871 St James Church and the temporary roof of the cathedral. The cathedral was promptly rebuilt with higher walls and a more permanent roof at the cost of £2,500.

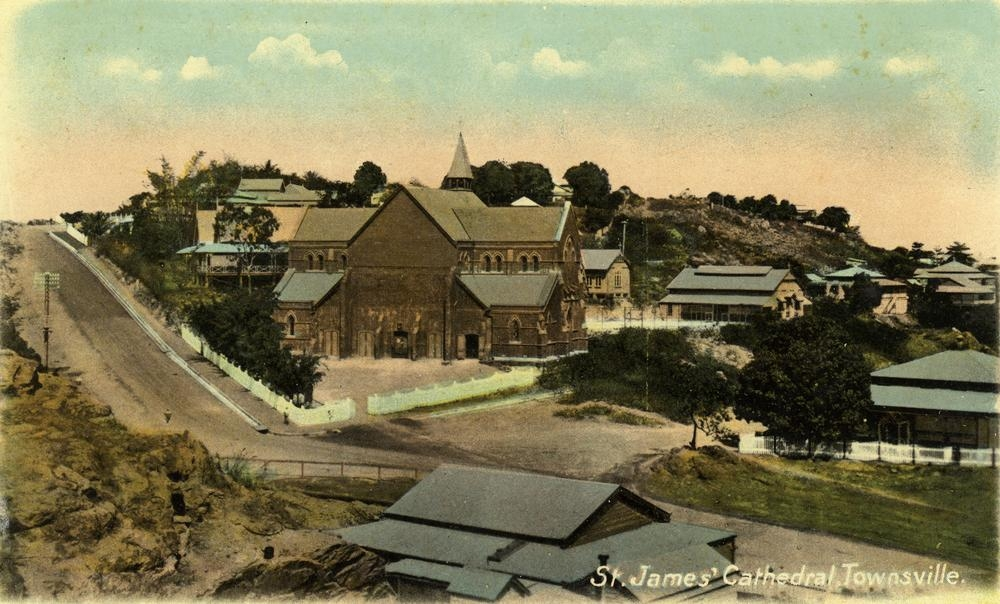
The incomplete cathedral, circa 1924

The second stage of the cathedral, the 1959–1960 western extension and tower, was designed in 1955 by Melbourne architect Louis Williams, with Townsville architects Black and Paulsen responsible for its execution. The statue of St James was sculptured by German-born Brisbane sculptor, Erwin Guth. The final foundation stone was laid in 1960 marking the completion of the cathedral.

The main western facade together with the statue of St James, part of the roof and a section of the eastern wall were severely damaged by Cyclone Althea in 1972, and restored in the same year. The completed cathedral was consecrated in 1978. It also serves as a concert hall in the wider Townsville community.

The deanery adjacent to the cathedral was erected in 1959–1960, replacing an earlier structure. It does not form part of the heritage-listing of the cathedral.

== Description ==
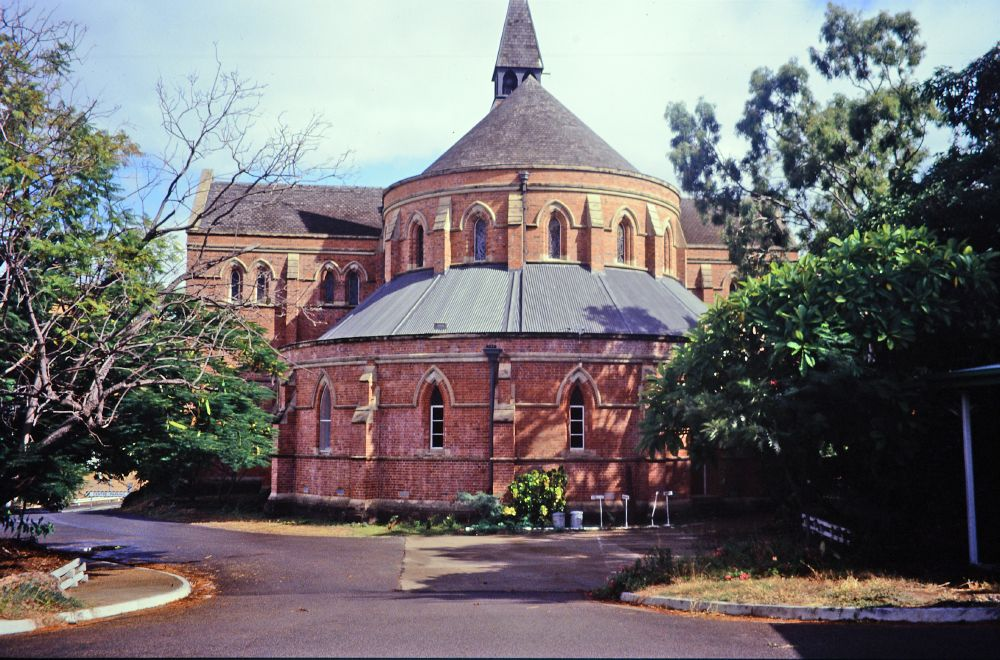
Rear view, 2013

St James Anglican Cathedral, constructed in English Bond red brick with dressed sandstone trim, is located on a terraced site on Melton Hill between the Townsville central business district and Cleveland Bay.

The Gothic Revival building was built in two stages, both of which are quite obvious, both in materials and design. The main roof is clad with slate and has a small spire over the nave and transept junction. The lower roof to the side aisles and ambulatory has ribbed metal cladding.

The chancel is surrounded by an ambulatory which contains the vestry and a Seaman's Chapel. The north transept has a large organ loft inserted and the roof features exposed trusses with a diagonally boarded ceiling. Cast iron columns with clerestory above separate the side aisles from the nave. The clerestory of the original section of the building contains stained glass windows.

The 1959 addition appears to be a Modernist interpretation of what was originally intended. It has amber glass hopper windows with external concrete screens to the nave. The west entry consists of a large recessed pointed arch with undistinguished mosaic artwork to both the interior and exterior. The floors are of concrete and the building features carved timber pews, reredos screen and pulpit. A large statue of St James is attached to a bell tower on the northern side of the entrance.

The 1950s deanery is located to the northern side of the building, above an excavated stone embankment and facing Cleveland Terrace. It is not heritage-listed

A single-storeyed timber Synod Hall, built in 1888 on a separate site, is located to the east of the building beyond a large bitumen carpark.

== Heritage listing ==
St James Cathedral was listed on the Queensland Heritage Register on 21 October 1992 having satisfied the following criteria.

The place is important in demonstrating the evolution or pattern of Queensland's history.

St James Cathedral, erected in two stages 1887–1892 and 1959–1960, is important in demonstrating the pattern of establishment and growth of the Anglican Church in North Queensland in the late 19th century.

The place is important because of its aesthetic significance.

It is important in exhibiting a range of aesthetic characteristics valued by the Townsville community in general, and by the Townsville Anglican congregation in particular, namely the contribution of the building, in its scale, form and materials, to the Townsville landscape; its value as a major Townsville landmark; and the quality and craftsmanship of its interior and furnishings.

The place has a strong or special association with a particular community or cultural group for social, cultural or spiritual reasons.

It has had a strong and special association as a centre of Anglican worship and community life in Townsville for over a century, and as part of an historic church grouping which includes Synod Hall (1888).

The place has a special association with the life or work of a particular person, group or organisation of importance in Queensland's history.

It has a special association with the work of 19th century Sydney architect Arthur Blacket and with 20th century Melbourne architect Louis Williams, and their contributions to ecclesiastical architecture in Australia.

== Deans ==
The following individuals have served as deans of St James' Cathedral, Townsville:

Order	Name	Date installed	Term ended	Term of office	Notes
1	Bernard Tringham	1965	1969	3–4 years	
2	Wilfred Lancelot Harmer	1969	1972	2–3 years	
3	Adrian Owen Charles	1972	1977	4–5 years	
4	David Philp	1977	1981	9–10 years	
5		1981	1985	3–4 years	
6	Donald Barter	1985	1989	3–4 years	
7	Ron Wood	1989	1999	9–10 years	
8		1999	2001	1–2 years	
9	David Lunniss	2001	2004	2–3 years	
10		2004	2013	8–9 years	
11	Rodney Marshall MacDonald	2013	2020	3–4 years	
12	Kenneth Lay	2020	2026	5–6 years	
13	Jeffery Akoai	2026			

== See also ==
- St James' Cathedral
- List of cathedrals in Australia
