= Anglican Bishop of Riverina =

Bishop of Riverina
- Bishopric

anglican
- Coat of arms of the Diocese
- Incumbent: Donald Kirk since 15 June 2019
- Style: The Right Reverend

Location
- Country: Australia
- Ecclesiastical province: New South Wales

Information
- First holder: Sydney Linton
- Denomination: Anglicanism
- Established: 1 May 1884
- Diocese: Riverina
- Cathedral: St Alban's Cathedral, Griffith

Website
- Diocese of Riverina

The Bishop of Riverina is the diocesan bishop of the Anglican Diocese of Riverina, Australia.

== List of Bishops of Riverina ==
Bishops of Riverina
No	From	Until	Incumbent	Notes
1	1884	1894	Sydney Linton	Consecrated 1 May 1884 and installed 18 March 1885; died in office.
2	1896	1925	Ernest Anderson	
3	1925	1943	Sir Reginald Halse KBE CMG	Translated to Brisbane; knighted in 1962.
4	1944	1950	Charles Murray	Died in office.
5	1951	1965	Hector Robinson	Previously Archdeacon of Mackay; died in office.
6	1966	1971	Sir John Grindrod KBE	Translated to Rockhampton and then to Brisbane; Primate of Australia, 1982–1989; knighted in 1983.
7	1972	1992	Barry Hunter AM	Previously Archdeacon of the East in the Diocese of Rockhampton.
8	1993	2004	Bruce Clark	Previously Archdeacon of Wide Bay and then Moreton.
9	2005	2012	Douglas Stevens	
10	2014	2018	Rob Gillion	
11	2019	present	Donald Kirk	Installed 15 June 2019.
