= Anglican Bishop of Rockhampton =

Bishop of Rockhampton
- Bishopric

anglican
- Coat of arms of the Diocese
- Incumbent: Peter Grice since 27 February 2021
- Style: The Right Reverend

Location
- Country: Australia
- Ecclesiastical province: Queensland

Information
- First holder: Nathaniel Dawes
- Denomination: Anglicanism
- Established: 1892
- Diocese: Rockhampton
- Cathedral: St Paul's Cathedral, Rockhampton

Website
- Diocese of Rockhampton

The Bishop of Rockhampton is the diocesan bishop of the Anglican Diocese of Rockhampton, Australia.

== List of Bishops of Rockhampton ==
Bishops of Rockhampton
No	From	Until	Incumbent	Notes
1	1892	1908	Nathaniel Dawes	Previously Archdeacon of Anglican Diocese of Brisbane and later its first coadjutor bishop.
2	1909	1920	George Halford	Previously Archdeacon of Mitchell, Queensland; resigned to establish the Order of Witness.
3	1921	1927	Philip Crick	Translated to Ballarat.
4	1928	1946	Fortescue Ash	
5	1947	1958	James Housden	Translated to Newcastle.
6	1959	1963	Theodore McCall	Translated to Wangaratta.
7	1963	1971	Donald Shearman	Later Bishop of Grafton; subsequently resigned his holy orders and was defrocked.
8	1971	1980	Sir John Grindrod KBE	Translated from Riverina; translated to Brisbane; later also Primate of Australia.
9	1981	1996	George Hearn	
10	1996	2003	Ron Stone AM	Previously an assistant bishop in Tasmania.
11	2003	2013	Godfrey Fryar	Previously Assistant Bishop in the Diocese of Canberra and Goulburn.
12	2014	2020	David Robinson	
13	2021	present	Peter Grice	Previously Dean of Geraldton; installed 27 February 2021.
