= St Mary's Anglican Church, Mount Morgan =

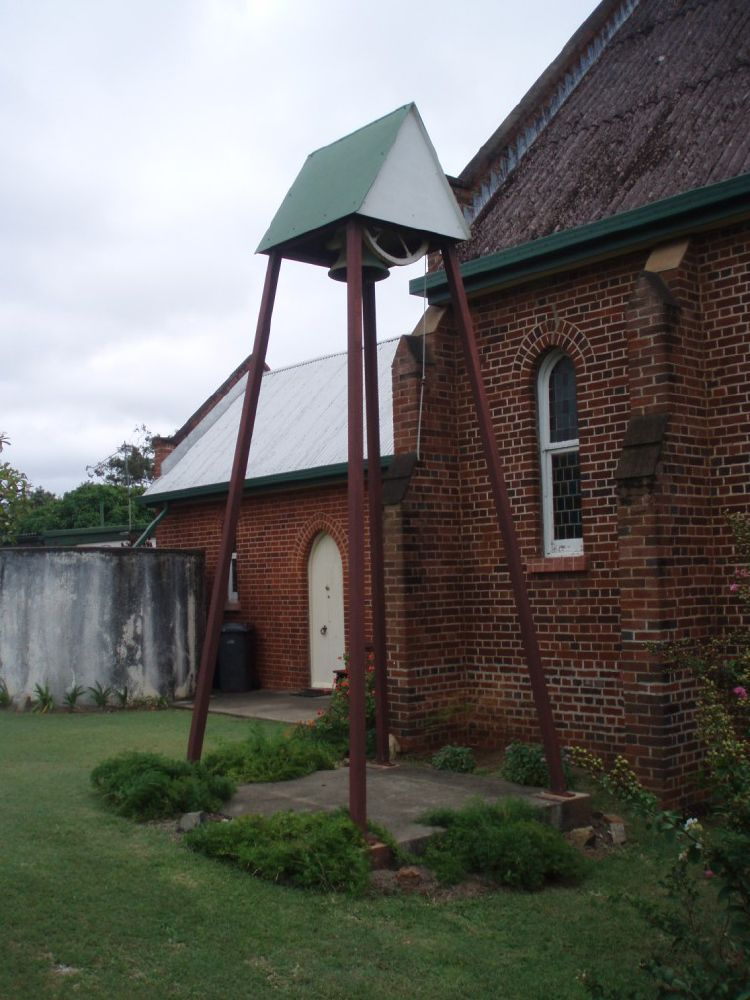
- St Mary's Anglican Church, Church hall and Bell Tower, 2009

- Location within Queensland Location within Australia
- 23.6463°S 150.3866°E
- Location: 11 Gordon Street, Mount Morgan, Rockhampton Region, Queensland, Australia

History
- Design period: 1870s–1890s (late 19th century)
- Built: 1888

Queensland Heritage Register
- Official name: St Mary's Anglican Church, Church hall and Bell Tower
- Type: state heritage (built, landscape)
- Designated: 25 August 2000
- Reference no.: 601690
- Significant period: 1880s–1900s (historical) ongoing (social)
- Significant components: views to, furniture/fittings, church, church hall/sunday school hall, tower – bell / belfry, apse
- Builders: Thomas Glen Cornes

St Mary's Anglican Church is a State heritage-listed church at 11 Gordon Street, Mount Morgan, Rockhampton Region, Queensland, Australia. It was designed and built in 1888–1889 by Scottish-born Thomas Glen Cornes (1842–1903), superintendent of sawmills and carpenters at the Mount Morgan Gold Mining Company Limited. It was added to the Queensland Heritage Register on 25 August 2000.

== History ==
In 1889 or earlier, English-born James Wesley ('Wesley') Hall (1839–1901), the first general manager of the Mount Morgan Gold Mining Company Limited (October 1886 – December 1891), and Mount Morgan's first mayor (1890–1891), donated the funds required for the erection of St Mary's Anglican Church, in Gordon Street, Mount Morgan. The Vicar at this time was Reverend G.L. Wallace, and the "first Confirmation Service was held at the end of 1889, forty-seven candidates being presented to Bishop Webber of Brisbane". This event taking place prior to the formation of the separate Rockhampton Diocese (in 1892).

The great benefactor of St Mary's Anglican Church was James Wesley ('Wesley') Hall (1839–1901). Wesley Hall was the general manager of the Mount Morgan gold mining syndicate from 1884 to 1886 and the first general manager of Mount Morgan Gold Mining Company Limited from 1886 until he resigned in December 1891. He was also a brother to the Mine's other influential Hall brothers, Thomas Skarratt Hall and Walter Russell Hall.

Wesley Hall also took an interest in the Mount Morgan township when he became the first mayor of the Mount Morgan Borough Council in 1890.

He was also instrumental in instituting in 1894 the symbol of Central Queensland soccer – the Wesley Hall Cup – a challenge trophy for the Mount Morgan British Association Football [Soccer] Union. Wesley Hall bought the ornate-silver trophy in London (where he was living at the time) and had it shipped to Rockhampton in 1894. Beautifully engraved on the trophy is "Challenge Cup. Presented by Mr and Mrs Wesley Hall". His wife was Melbourne-born Mary Frederica Dora ('Dora') Hall (nee Dempster) (1864–1895).

With Wesley Hall's resignation from the Mine in December 1891, the first phase of the Mount Morgan Company's history has been said to have ended:

He had guided it through its formative years with skill and dedication until it achieved fame as the richest single gold mine in the world. Unlike his two brothers [Walter Russell & Thomas Skarratt Hall] who "dabbled" in mining, Wesley Hall was an experienced practical miner. He was responsible for building the Lower and Top Works which increased gold extractions to ninety-eight per cent. The Top works were probably the largest of their kind in the world at the time, so his pride in the mine was justified.

Though resigned as Manager, Wesley Hall still maintained an interest in the Mine as one of the Company's Board members. With his death on 7 January 1901 (aged 61) in Melbourne, his position on the Board was replaced by Kelso King. The extant St Mary's Anglican Church is a red brick building constructed from bricks made in Mount Morgan's own brick works. Other Mount Morgan buildings similarly constructed include the Grand Hotel (1901) on the corner of Central and Morgan Streets, and the Masonic Temple (c. 1903) in Gordon Street. One heritage study detailed:

The church is built of red faced bricks and comprises two parts – the main church building, and a vestry addition. The building is unusual for its octagonal apse, which is roofed in sheet iron. The walls of the church have solid brick buttresses and small lancet windows. The interior remains relatively intact: the apse features a timber lined ceiling with exposed joists.

The first Church of England erected in Mount Morgan "was a wood and iron structure on the site of the present [St Mary's Church] hall". Besides the existing 1889 Church is a small timber belltower that is presumed to remain from the first church building. At the rear of the present church is located the St Mary's Church hall. This Church Hall was erected in 1902 on the site of the original church. This Hall has been described as "one of the finest timber halls in the town, both because of its design and also its integrity". The Hall's verandahs comprising alternating large and small timber dowelling balustrades, with a portico entrance with a small gable vent.

St Luke's Anglican Church in Mount Morgan was opened on Sunday 14 October 1888 by the resident priest, Rev. John Vosper. Despite being built of brick, on 22 December 1888, it was wrecked by a severe gale with repairs estimated at £400. Following a public fundraising, repairs were underway in July 1889. The church was re-opened as St Mary's Anglican Church on Sunday 8 September 1889 by the Bishop of Brisbane, William Webber.

St Mary's Anglican Church was consecrated by Bishop Nathaniel Dawes, the first Bishop of Rockhampton, on 5 October 1899. The Church's rector at this time was the Reverend H.T. Hainsselin.

The first Anglican cleric to reach nearby Rockhampton was Queensland's first Anglican Bishop, Bishop Edward Tufnell, in November 1860, though lay ministers held Anglican services in Rockhampton during the late 1850s. Following shortly after Tufnell's visit, The Rev. Thomas Jones arrived at Rockhampton, becoming the popular pioneer Anglican Rector. Jones encouraged his congregation to raise sufficient funds in 1862 to allow construction of a small timber church to be built on what later became the site of the present Cathedral Hall and Offices. Later more funds were raised for a new and larger church with plans drawn up and construction beginning on St Paul's Church in 1872, though this building was not completed and consecrated until 1883. In 1892 the Church of England Diocese of Rockhampton was formed and the St Paul's Church was upgraded becoming the Cathedral Church of Saint Paul the Apostle. The foundation bishop, The Right Reverend Nathaniel Dawes, was formally emplaced on 30 November 1892.

Reverend Arthur Augustuss Fellows' (1967) autobiographical history of life and service in the Rockhampton Anglican Diocese states work on the "initial beautifying of St Mary's Church in the Mount" was carried out during the residence of Rev. Farnham Maynard (1910s – resigned April 1920). It was during this period that there was "added the Rood Screen, the Baptistry and the Vestry at the west end of the Church". On these, and later additions to St Mary's interior decoration, Fellows pointed out that the:

"... Rood Screen in St. Mary's was a Memorial of World War 1 (although the Crucifix on the top of it did not arrive from England until the time of the Reverend W.B. Charles). As a Memorial of World War II, we put in the two stained-glass windows in the Sanctuary – the Annunciation and the Nativity – as well as the side chapel dedicated to St. Oswald, King Martyr."

During Canon E.A. Wight's residence (1939–42), the corrugated iron roof of the St Mary's Church was replaced by a fibro corrugated roof. The emergence of the Oxford Movement and its effect on the practice of the Church of England occurred during the early decades of the 19th century:

After the threat of liberalism had receded another challenge arose, with the growth of scientific discovery... In 1833, spurred by John Keble's Assize Sermon at Oxford, a group of [Anglican] theologians began to fight against liberalism and the new science. Their crusade became known as the Oxford Movement... They set out to create - or to re-create - a Church that was chiefly concerned not with social and political influence but with spirituality and its expression through ritual, as had been the concern of the Catholic Revival.

Although the Oxford Movement was largely concerned with doctrinal reform of the Church of England, it also affected "the interior arrangements of churches; older churches were remodelled and new churches built... with the focus on the altar rather than the pulpit."

The rood-screen is an example of the effect of this Movement on internal church architecture, often viewed "an open screen, often richly carved and painted, across the entrance to the chancel of a church, extending from floor level to the underside of the rood-beam." The rood-screen extant within St Mary's was erected after the end of World War I. Most rood-screens found in the Rockhampton Anglican Diocese were erected as World War I Memorials. Within the Diocese of Rockhampton, apart from the example in St Mary's in Mount Morgan, the only other extant examples of rood-screens are found in the Anglican churches at Jericho, Barcaldine, and St Mark's in Allenstown, Rockhampton.

Mount Morgan is a gold and copper mining town, that throughout much of its life has experienced only the effect of one major mine and one mining corporation involved in its activities at any one time. "The existence of a single mine and the longevity of the mine make Mount Morgan outstanding in Queensland mining history". And as part of this phenomenon, the fluctuations in the fortunes of the mine and its company have similarly affected upon the township itself, causing fluctuations in employment, town population and the town's size.

Despite the ebb and flow of the town's fortunes, Mount Morgan still retains much of its early character evident in the scale of its buildings and their siting. "It has a fine collection of town buildings - Churches, Halls, Shops, Hotels, and civic buildings: Court House, Police Station, Shire Hall, and Railway Station. Together these buildings reflect the scale of the town and its dependence upon a single mining operation – very few of the buildings are of high-style architecture but are vernacular in character."

The extant St Mary's Church in Gordon Street is a product of the initial development of the town of Mount Morgan following the discovery of gold and the establishment of the mine from 1885–86. The formal establishment of Mount Morgan's town life is typified by the various services, societies, and churches which established themselves during 1885–1891. At its peak in the 1910s, Mount Morgan had a town population estimated at 14,000, but by 1976 this had diminished to only 3,246.

The hilly terrain in which the Mount Morgan township was spawned is one of the town's most dominant features. These hills, combined with the grid layout of the town has produced quite unusual effects where "some quite modest buildings are very prominent within the townscape, because of their hillside location, and the townscape importance of larger buildings is heightened, due to their location at the tops of ridges." This includes the visibility of St Mary's Church, but is even more pronounced with regards to the Masonic Hall, that is also situated on Gordon Street.

In October 2014, St Mary's celebrated its 125th anniversary.

== Description ==
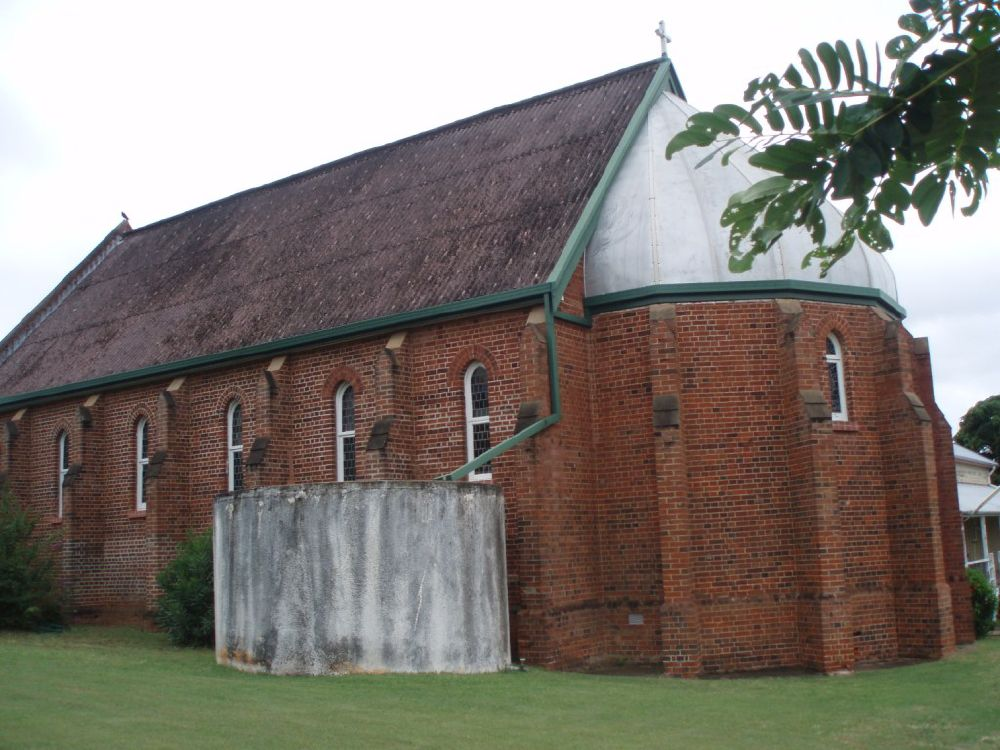
Church, from rear, 2009

=== St Mary's Church ===
The main St Mary's Anglican Church building runs parallel to Gordon Street in Mount Morgan township, and is of two distinct components: the original Church with octagonal apse (eastern end); and a later added vestry (western end). St Mary's Church is a prominent visual element in both the Gordon Street and greater Mount Morgan township built landscape. This Church is part of an Anglican church site that also contains a church hall, rectory, and bell tower.

The extant church is a substantial red faced brick building, featuring external solid brick buttresses and lancet windows. The apse section of the church has metal roof sheeting. Whereas the main roof of the church – a simple gable roof – is clad in asbestos roof sheeting material. The vestry addition to the church is also of red brick, and has a corrugated sheet metal gabled roof. This structure has windows and doors that reflect the form of the original church building. Storm water from the main church structure and the vestry is collected in two separate concrete water tanks that are visually obtrusive. These storm water tanks are situated on the Gordon Street side of the main church building.

The bell tower is a timber framed tower, situated on the Gordon Street side of the main church building.

The interior of St Mary's Church remains relatively intact. The apse features a timber-lined ceiling with exposed joists, and the internal walls are rendered brick. An important internal decorative feature of St Mary's Anglican Church is the extant rood screen. Internal church roof features include exposed truss work and roof purloins with no ceiling lining, thereby exposing the underside of the roof sheeting material.

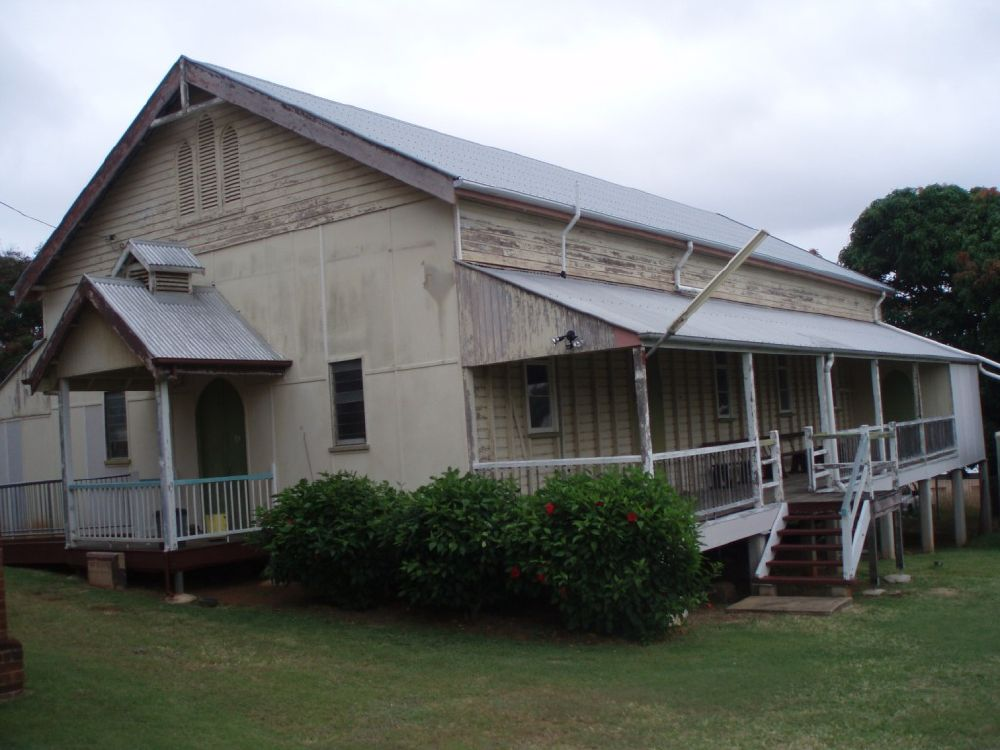
Sunday School and Hall, 2009

=== Church Hall ===
St Mary's Anglican Church Hall is a fine extant example of a timber hall, which is slightly elevated off ground level on small timber stumps. The church hall is clad in timber weatherboards, and is rectangular in shape with a gabled roof lined with corrugated metal sheeting. The hall has verandahs to eastern and western elevations, with a portico entrance with a small gable vent to the southern end. Verandahs on this Hall contain a combination of original timber dowelling balustrades, and more recent metal additions associated with walkways.

Internally the hall is lined with timber VJ boards, and the roof has exposed truss work.

== Heritage listing ==
St Mary's Anglican Church was listed on the Queensland Heritage Register on 25 August 2000 having satisfied the following criteria.

The place is important in demonstrating the evolution or pattern of Queensland's history.

St Mary's Anglican Church complex is important in demonstrating the pattern of evolution of the central Queensland mining town of Mount Morgan, and the concomitant role of the Church of England in meeting the needs of this important mining community's Anglican parishioners.

The place demonstrates rare, uncommon or endangered aspects of Queensland's cultural heritage.

St Mary's demonstrates a rare example of internal church decoration by possessing an extant example of a Rood-screen, an aspect of internal church architecture associated with the influences of the Oxford Movement.

The place is important because of its aesthetic significance.

This church also exhibits particular aesthetic characteristics contributing to both the streetscape of Gordon Street, as well as being a significant component of the broader historic Mount Morgan township landscape, valued not only by the local Mount Morgan parishioner community, but also the broader community.

The place has a strong or special association with a particular community or cultural group for social, cultural or spiritual reasons.

This place has a special association with both the Mount Morgan and broader Rockhampton Anglican community for both social and spiritual reasons. This special association also extends to recognition of Mount Morgan's Anglican mining community, and the contributions of James Wesley Hall in establishing the current Church building.
