= St Mark's Anglican Church, Rockhampton =

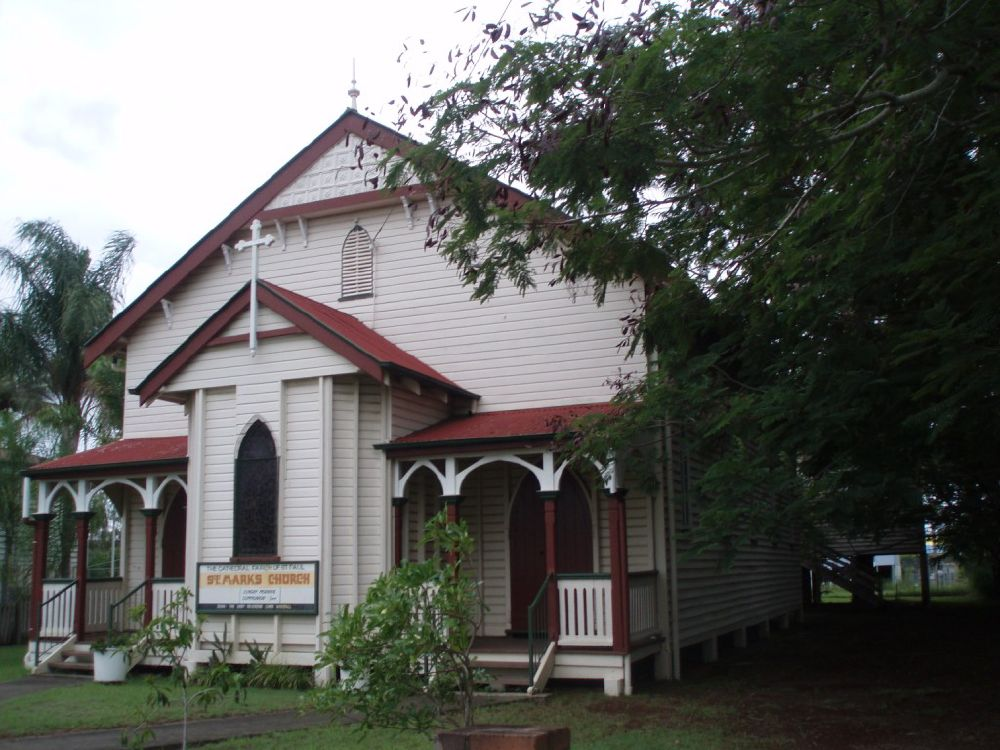
- St Mark's Anglican Church, 2009

- Location within Queensland Location within Australia
- 23.3928°S 150.5041°E
- Location: 36 Larnach Street, Allenstown, Rockhampton, Rockhampton Region, Queensland, Australia

History
- Design period: 1900–1914 (early 20th century)
- Built: 1900

Site notes
- Architect: Louis Spier Robertson
- Architectural style: Gothic

Queensland Heritage Register
- Official name: St Marks Church
- Type: state heritage (built)
- Designated: 28 July 2000
- Reference no.: 602031
- Significant period: 1900s (historical); 1900s (fabric) ongoing (social)
- Significant components: views to, stained glass window/s, furniture/fittings, baptistry, church

St Mark's Anglican Church is a heritage-listed former church at 36 Larnach Street, Allenstown, Rockhampton, Rockhampton Region, Queensland, Australia. It was designed by architect Louis Spier Robertson and was built in 1900. It was added to the Queensland Heritage Register on 28 July 2000.

== History ==
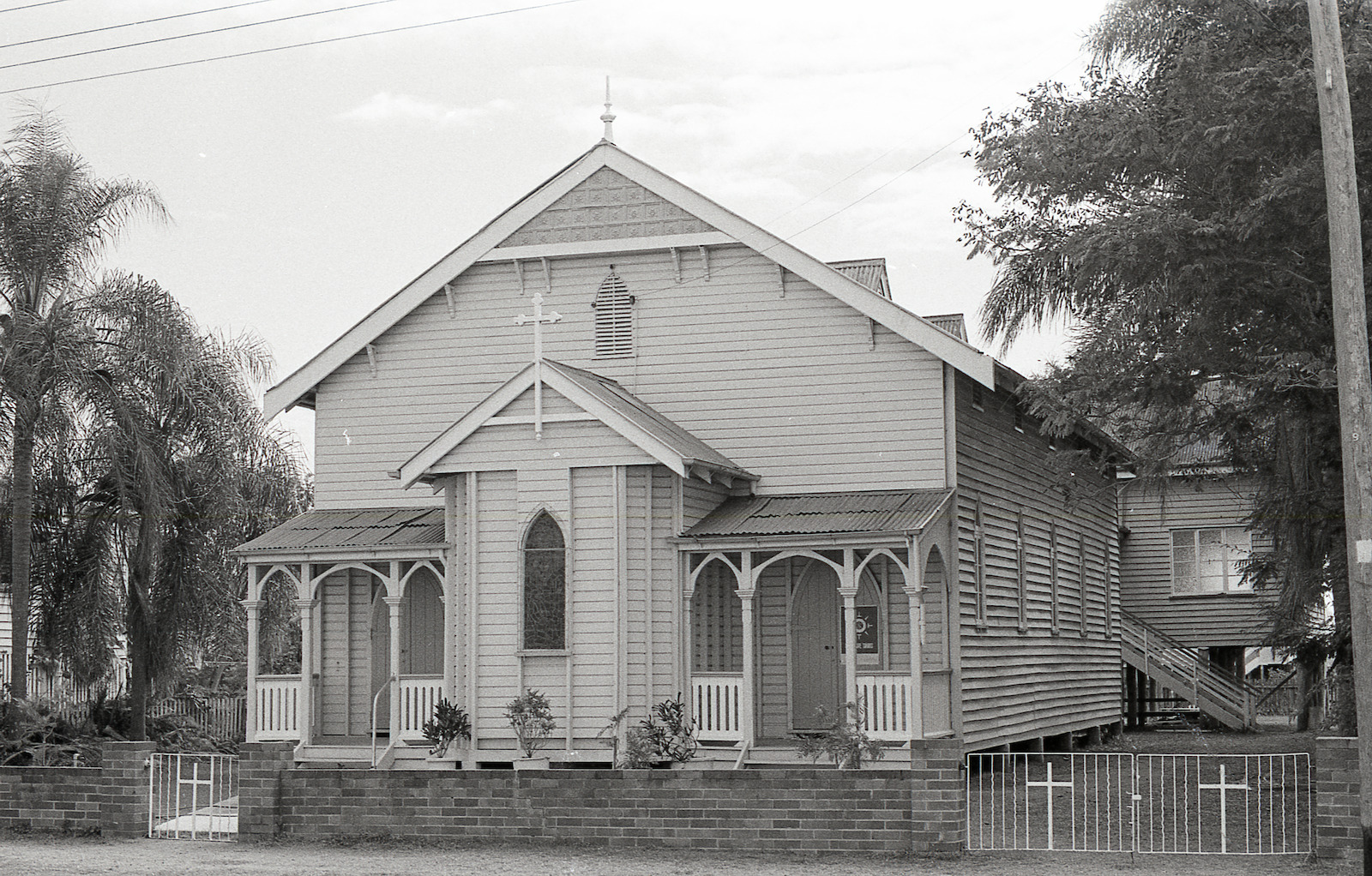
St Mark's Anglican Church, 1975

St Mark's Anglican Church was erected at Allenstown in 1900. The architect was Louis Spier Robertson of Rockhampton.

The foundation stone of St Mark's was laid by Mrs Dawes, the wife of the first Bishop of the Diocese of Rockhampton (The Right Revd. Nathaniel Dawes), on 14 October 1900. This Church was subsequently completed and able to be used for services for the first time on Sunday, 23 December 1900.

St Mark's is also located on Larnach Street, which appears to be a street named in honour of an early (1860s) Rockhampton Anglican churchwarden and member of the Church of England Aid Society - J.A. Larnach.

The Rockhampton suburb of Allenstown was the first suburb south of the Fitzroy River. This place obtained its name through William Allen, a merchant and leading layman of the Primitive Methodist Church. In about 1864, William Allen subdivided land in the Dawson Road area and sold these blocks "to working men for $30 an allotment, allowing them nine months to complete the payments. When one of these men was asked where he lived he is supposed to have replied 'Allen's Town'."

Allenstown's St Mark's Church is one of two identical buildings, both of which were constructed in 1900 by the Anglican Cathedral Parish to meet the needs of Rockhampton's suburban parishioners. St Mark's remains largely in its original configuration, while the other example in Wandal has since been demolished.

The first Anglican cleric to reach Rockhampton was Queensland's first Anglican Bishop, Bishop Edward Tufnell, in November 1860, though lay ministers held Anglican services in Rockhampton during the late 1850s. Following shortly after Tuffnell's visit, The Revd. Thomas Jones arrived at Rockhampton, becoming the popular pioneer Anglican rector. Jones encouraged his congregation to raise sufficient funds in 1862 to allow construction of a small timber church to be built on what later became the site of the present Cathedral Hall and Offices.

Later more funds were raised for a new and larger church with plans drawn up and construction beginning on St Paul's Church in 1872, though this building was not completed and consecrated until 1883. In 1892, the Church of England Diocese of Rockhampton was formed and the St Paul's Church was upgraded becoming the Cathedral Church of Saint Paul the Apostle. The foundation bishop, The Right Revd. Nathaniel Dawes, was formally emplaced on 30 November 1892.

St Mark's is the only remaining ecclesiastical building in south Rockhampton which retains the vernacular building style in timber. The interior retains the integrity of the arrangement of furnishings and liturgical accoutrements associated with the influences of the Oxford Movement. The interior of the building has a rood screen across the chancel - one of few remaining examples extant within the Diocese of Rockhampton, and an apsidal sanctuary.

The emergence of the Oxford Movement and its effect on the practice of the Church of England occurred during the early decades of the 19th century. After the threat of liberalism had receded another challenge arose, with the growth of scientific discovery. In 1833, spurred by John Keble's Assize Sermon at Oxford, a group of Anglican theologians began to fight against liberalism and the new science. Their crusade became known as the Oxford Movement. They set out to create (or re-create) a Church that was chiefly concerned not with social and political influence but with spirituality and its expression through ritual, as had been the concern of the Catholic Revival. Although the Oxford Movement was largely concerned with doctrinal reform of the Church of England, it also influenced the interior arrangements of churches with the focus on the altar rather than the pulpit. The rood screen is an example of the influence of the Oxford Movement on internal church architecture, often viewed as "an open screen, often richly carved and painted, across the entrance to the chancel of a church, extending from floor level to the underside of the rood-beam."

The rood screen extant within St Mark's is believed to have been erected in the 1920s. Most other rood screens found in the Rockhampton Anglican Diocese were erected as World War One Memorials, though St Mark's does not possess any designated plaque to confirm whether this was the case though it is presumed to be so.

Within the Diocese of Rockhampton, apart from the example in St Mark's in Allenstown, the only other extant examples of rood screens are found in the Anglican churches at Mount Morgan, Jericho and Barcaldine.

Internally St Mark's is largely in original condition, though the sanctuary was altered with cladding in the 1960s. The altar furnishings are 1960s reproductions, and there is also an Icon of Saint Mark which was donated by the Greek Community in the 1950s.

The church was sold on 22 April 2021 to a Townsville couple for $140,000. According to the real estate agency which handled the sale, there was considerable interest in the property, but the restrictions associated with the heritage listing had been a deterrent for a number of prospective buyers.

== Description ==
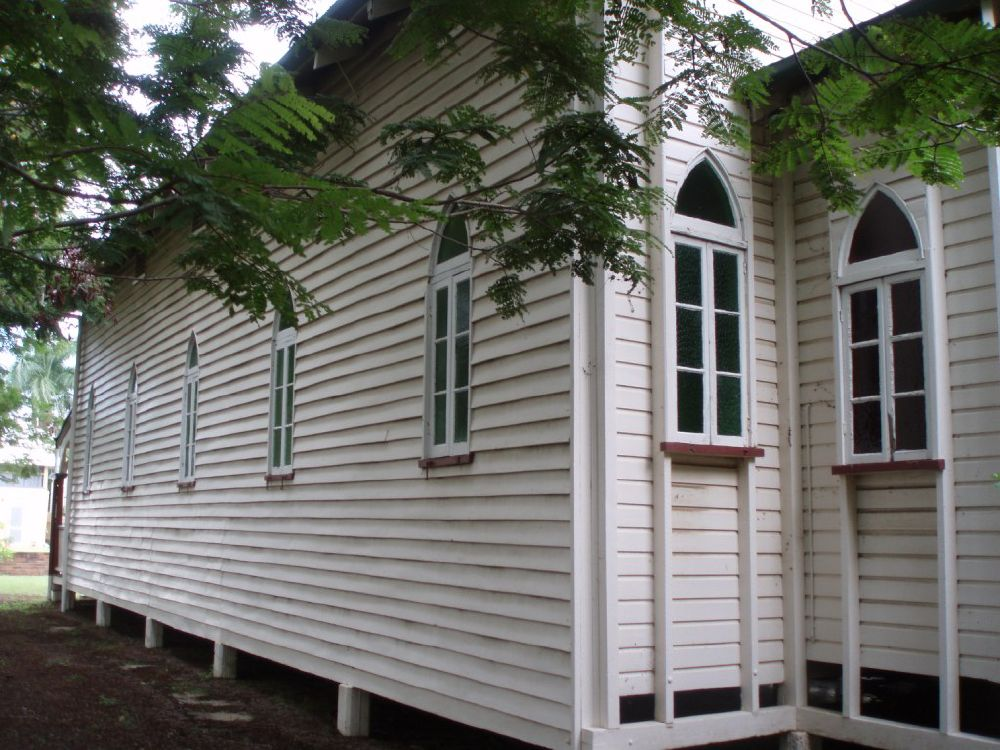
Side view, 2009

St Mark's Anglican Church is situated in Larnach Street, Allenstown, and complements the surrounding local streetscape of timber residences.

The building is timber framed and clad with tongue and groove hardwood, parts of which have exposed framing to the exterior, and windows have pointed arch heads. The gabled roof is covered in corrugated iron.

The street facade has a projecting baptistery flanked by two porches either side, and there is a small vestry attached to the northern side of the sanctuary at the east end.

The interior of the building has a rood screen across the chancel and an apsidal sanctuary. St Mark's also contains a nave, pews and baptismal font all in original form, and there is stained glass in the baptistery.

== Heritage listing ==
St Mark's Anglican Church was listed on the Queensland Heritage Register on 28 July 2000 having satisfied the following criteria.

The place is important in demonstrating the evolution or pattern of Queensland's history.

St Mark's Anglican Church is important in demonstrating the pattern of suburban evolution in the City of Rockhampton, and the concomitant role of the Church of England in meeting the needs of suburban parishioners - in this case in Allenstown - Rockhampton's first suburb south of the Fitzroy River.

The place demonstrates rare, uncommon or endangered aspects of Queensland's cultural heritage.

St Mark's demonstrates a rare example of internal church decoration by possessing an extant example of a Rood-screen, an aspect of internal church architecture associated with the influences of the Oxford Movement.

The place is important because of its aesthetic significance.

This Church is a fine example of the timber Gothic-style architecture dating from 1900, and is the only timber vernacular ecclesiastical construction extant in Rockhampton on the south side of the Fitzroy River.

This church also exhibits particular aesthetic characteristics contributing to the streetscape of Larnach Street, valued not only by the local Allenstown parishioner community, but also the broader community.

The place has a strong or special association with a particular community or cultural group for social, cultural or spiritual reasons.

This place has a special association with both the Allenstown and broader Rockhampton Anglican community for both social and spiritual reasons.

The place has a special association with the life or work of a particular person, group or organisation of importance in Queensland's history.

St Mark's also has special association with the work and organisation of the Anglican Diocese of Rockhampton and the needs of Rockhampton's suburban parishioners.
