= Bishop of Rockhampton =

Bishop of Rockhamption may refer to:

- Anglican Bishop of Rockhampton
- Bishop of the Roman Catholic Diocese of Rockhampton
