= Diocese of Rockhampton =

Diocese of Rockhampton could refer to:

- Anglican Diocese of Rockhampton
- Roman Catholic Diocese of Rockhampton
