= Helen Hugo Barrett =

English missionary nurse (1921–2019)

- Born: 1921; Isleworth
- Died: 25 November 2019
- Occupation: Nurse
- Father: William Barrett
- Awards: Member of the Order of Australia (In recognition of service to the community, particularly in relation to the women and children of the Solomon and Torres Strait Islands through the Anglican Board of Missions and the Mothers Union., Miss Helen Hugo BARRETT, 2002); Member of the Order of the British Empire; Cross of Solomon Islands; Queen Elizabeth II Silver Jubilee Medal

Helen Hugo Barrett MBE AM CSI (1921 – 25 November 2019) worked as an English Anglican missionary nurse in the Solomon Islands for 37 years.

Barrett was born in 1921 in Isleworth, England, the daughter of William Edward Barrett, Anglican priest and future Dean of Brisbane, and Hilda Agnita Adams, a World War I nurse. When she was 18 months old, her family relocated to Australia. Barrett developed polio at age 10 and recovered without permanent disability. She and her siblings attended St Aidan's Anglican Girls' School in Corinda,at its founding in 1929. Barrett trained as a nurse in Sydney during World War II, then trained as a midwife in Brisbane.

From 1947 to 1984, Barrett worked for the Anglican Board of Mission (ABM) and Church of Melanesia. She started working as a school nurse in Santa Isabel, then at Kerepei Hospital on Ugi Island and St. Mary’s School at Maravovo on Guadacanal. She was headmistress of the Tasia School on Santa Isabel for almost a decade before heading up the Hospital of the Epiphany in Fauabu on Malaita Island as matron for seventeen years. While at Faubau she also ran maternal and child health and leprosy clinics and instructed nursing students.

Following her work in the Solomon Islands, she spent seven years on Thursday Island in Queensland, Australia working on behalf of the Mothers' Union.

== Awards and honors ==
Helen Hugo Barrett was awarded Member of the Order of the British Empire in 1970 "for services to nursing in the British Solomon Islands Protectorate." She was awarded a Queen Elizabeth II Silver Jubilee Medal in 1977, the Queensland Premier's Award for Excellence in 1995, Member of the Order of Australia (AM) in 2002, Cross of the Solomons Islands in 2005, and the Coaldrake Medal by the ABM in 2017.
