= Henry Linton =

English cricketer, civil servant

Personal information
- Full name: Henry Linton
- Born: 11 July 1838; St Neots, Huntingdonshire, England
- Died: 24 August 1866 (aged 28); Madras, Madras Presidency, British India
- Batting: Unknown
- Bowling: Unknown
- Relatives: Sydney Linton (brother)

Domestic team information
- Years: Team
- 1858–1859: Oxford University

Career statistics
Competition	First-class
Matches	4
Runs scored	44
Batting average	14.66
100s/50s	–/–
Top score	22*
Balls bowled	208
Wickets	4
Bowling average	19.75
5 wickets in innings	–
10 wickets in match	–
Best bowling	2/38
Catches/stumpings	3/–
- Source: Cricinfo, 22 March 2020

Not to be confused with the 19th-century wood-engraver Henry Linton (1815–1899).

Henry Linton (11 July 1838 – 24 August 1866) was an English first-class cricketer and an officer in the Indian Civil Service.

The son of Rev. Henry Linton, he was born in July 1838 at St Neots, Huntingdonshire. He was educated at Harrow School, before matriculating at Wadham College, Oxford in 1857, graduating with a B.A. in 1860. While studying at Oxford, he played first-class cricket for Oxford University on four occasions in 1858 and 1859, including two appearances in The University Match against Cambridge University. He scored 44 runs with a high score of 22 in his four first-class matches, in addition to taking 4 wickets with best figures of 2 for 38. After graduating from Oxford, he joined the Indian Civil Service. Linton died in British India at Madras in August 1866. His brother, Sydney, was also a first-class cricketer.
