= Bush Brotherhood =

Group of Australian Anglican priests

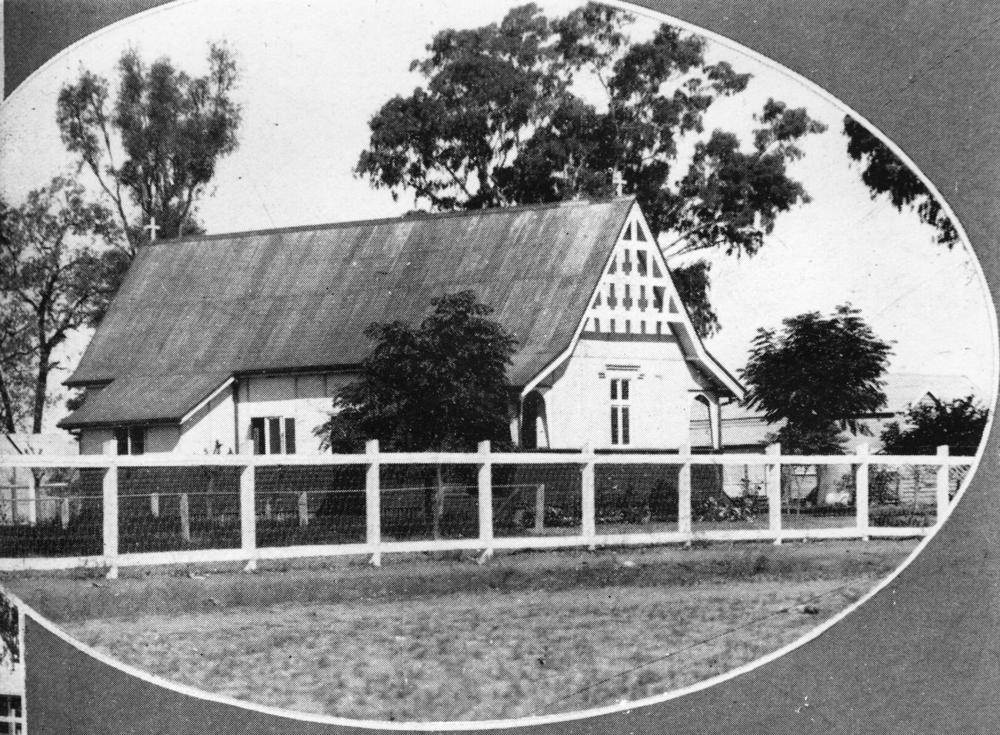
All Saints Chapel, known as the Bush Brotherhood of St Paul, Charleville, 1933

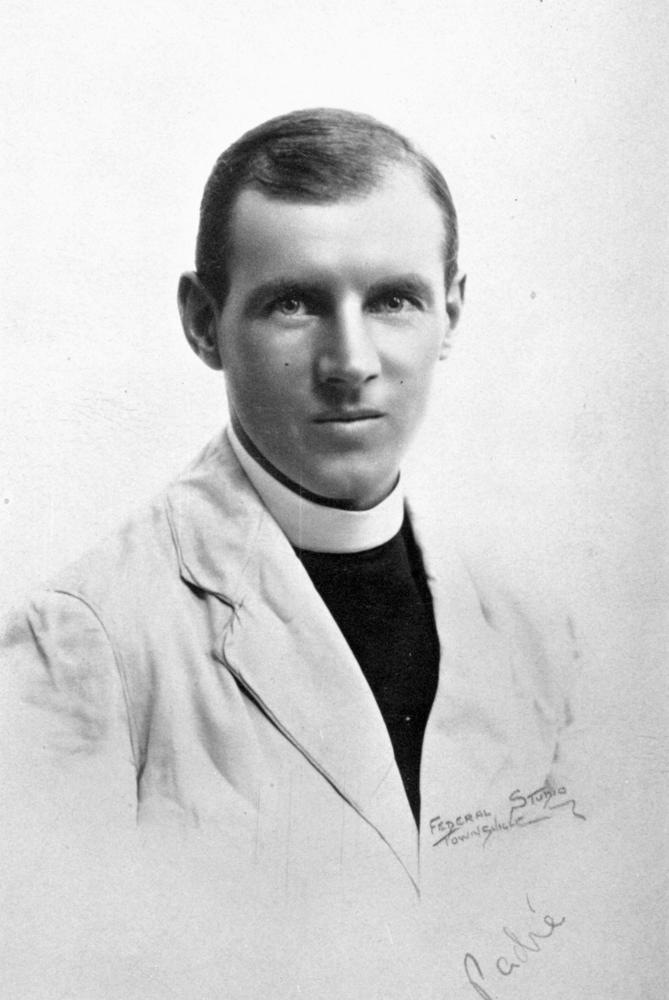
The Reverend Harold Victor Hodson, Bush Brother from England, stationed at Richmond, Queensland, 1913–1916

Bush Brotherhood refers to a set of Anglican religious orders providing itinerant priests to minister to sparsely settled rural districts in Australia. They were described as a "band of men" who could "preach like Apostles" and "ride like cowboys".

The Bush Brotherhoods had largely declined by the 1960s due to lack of recruitment. One group, The Brotherhood of the Good Shepherd, continues to operate in rural New South Wales.

== History ==
The St Andrew's Bush Brotherhood was established in 1897 in Longreach, Queensland, by the Bishop of Stepney, Canon Body and the Bishop of Rockhampton, Nathaniel Dawes. The first group of brothers was led by the Reverend George Halford.

The Brotherhood of St Barnabas was established in 1902 in Herberton, Queensland by Aneirun Vaughan Williams and Joseph Braybarton. It was also known as the North Queensland Brotherhood. It ceased itinerant preaching in the 1960s and became devoted to school chaplaincy. It ceased operation with the death of its last member in 2025.

The Brotherhood of the Good Shepherd was established about 1903 in Dubbo, New South Wales. The Brotherhood of the Good Shepherd published The Bush Brother magazine from 1904 to 1980.

The Bush Brotherhood of St Boniface operated in the Diocese of Bunbury in Western Australia from July 1911 to 1929.

In 1922, Bryan Robin published a book "The Sundowner" about his experiences in the Bush Brotherhood of St Barnabas in North Queensland from 1914 to 1921. This book attracted other priests to join the brotherhood.

The Brotherhood of St John the Baptist was established in Murray Bridge, South Australia.

The Bush Brotherhood of St Paul operated in Charleville and Cunnamulla in Queensland.

In 1972 the three remaining brotherhoods, St Barnabas, the Good Shepherd and St Paul formed the Company of Brothers but was defunct by the 1980s due to lack of recruits.

== Operation of the orders ==
There were a number of different orders of Bush Brothers, but all operated on a similar basis of an almost monastic life, committed to:

- temporary vows of poverty, chastity and obedience
- periodic returns from the bush to a community house for spiritual replenishment
- obedience to a warden or principal (often a bishop)

Their duties included:

- giving religious instruction in schools
- holding services
- administering sacraments

The Bush Brothers were either single (or left their wives behind during their period of service). Many were recruited from England where life in the Outback had a romantic appeal. Australian brothers were less frequently recruited.

Although the Bush Brothers originally rode horses, they drove vehicles in later years.

== Notable members ==
- William Barrett, Dean of Brisbane
- Wilfrid Belcher, Bishop of North Queensland
- Stephen Davies, Bishop of Carpentaria
- William Elsey, Bishop of Kalgoorlie
- John Feetham, Bishop of North Queensland
- Godfrey Fryar, Bishop of Rockhampton
- George Halford, Bishop of Rockhampton
- Frederick Hulton-Sams, known as the "fighting parson" for his boxing skills, he died in 1915 in World War I. His friends wrote a book about his experiences as a bush brother.
- John Hazlewood, Bishop of Ballarat
- Barry Hunter, Bishop of Riverina
- Hamish Jamieson, Bishop of Carpentaria and Bunbury
- Ken Mason, Bishop of the Northern Territory, Chairman of the Australian Board of Missions
- Lionel Renfrey, Dean of Adelaide, Assistant Bishop, Diocese of Adelaide
- Bryan Robin, Bishop of Adelaide
- Guy Roxby, died from typhoid in 1913, the first Brother to die in service
- Richard Thomas, Bishop of Willochra
- Graham Howard Walden, Bishop of The Murray
- Arnold Wylde, Bishop of Bathurst
- Robin Warsop, Brother of the Brotherhood of St. Barnabas, "The last Bush Brother"

== In popular culture ==
The narrator of Nevil Shute's novel In the Wet is a Bush Brother and provides a (fictional) account of the life of one of these itinerant priests.

== See also ==
- The Bush Brother
