= Louis Spier Robertson =

Australian architect

Louis Spier Robertson was an architect in Australia. Some of his works are now heritage-listed.

== Early life ==
Louis Spier Robertson was born 5 August 1868 in Sydney, New South Wales, Australia, the son of Louis Robertson (the principal assistant architect to the Government of New South Wales) and his wife Isabella (née Spier). He was educated at Sydney Grammar School.

== Architectural career ==
Robertson worked as a surveyor and architect in Sydney circa 1890 to 1896. In 1896, he moved to Rockhampton, Queensland, where he married Elizabeth Frances Leighton on 26 April 1896. Robertson began a successful architectural practice in Rockhampton at East Street from January 1897 until 1905 when he returned to Sydney. Despite this move, Robertson continued to undertake Queensland work, including later in partnership with his son (Louis S. Robertson and Son Architects).

In 1897, he applied for a patent for an improved hypodermic syringe.

== Later life ==
Robertson died suddenly on 17 April 1932. He was cremated at the Rookwood Crematorium on Monday 18 April 1932.

== Significant works ==
- 1900: St Paul's Cathedral Hall, Rockhampton
- 1900: St Mark's Anglican Church, Rockhampton
- 1910: Nelson House in Sydney, which was the first self-supporting steel framed building erected in Australia
