= Guy Roxby =

Anglican missionary priest

Guy Jocelyn Maude Roxby (b Portsmouth 16 August 1886 – d Aramac 8 August 1913) was an Anglican missionary priest in the second decade of the twentieth century.

Roxby was educated at Queens' College, Cambridge and Westcott House, Cambridge. He was ordained deacon in 1908 and priest in 1909. After a curacy at Holy Trinity Haverstock he went out to serve with St. Andrew's Bush Brotherhood in Queensland. His first service was on Christmas Day 1910 at Ilfracombe. A highly regarded priest, he died from typhoid, the first death amongst the brotherhood.

There is a memorial to Roxby within St Peter, Balcaldine.
