= Peter Grice =

Australian Anglican bishop and former lawyer

The Right Reverend Peter Grice
- Bishop of Rockhampton
- Church: Anglican Church of Australia
- Province: Province of Queensland
- Diocese: Diocese of Rockhampton
- Installed: 27 February 2021
- Predecessor: David Robinson
- Other post: Dean of Geraldton (Diocese of North West Australia) (2015–2020)

Orders
- Ordination: 2001 (as deacon); 2002 (as priest)
- Consecration: 24 February 2021 by Phillip Aspinall

Personal details
- Born: Peter John Grice; 1969 (age 56–57) Newcastle, New South Wales, Australia
- Denomination: Anglicanism
- Spouse: Virginia
- Children: 5
- Education: University of New South Wales (law); Sydney Missionary and Bible College (theology)

Peter John Grice (born 1969) is an Australian Anglican bishop and former lawyer who has served as the 13th Bishop of Rockhampton since 27 February 2021. He previously served as Dean of Geraldton in the Diocese of North West Australia between 2015 and 2020.

== Early life, education and parish ministry ==
Grice was born in 1969 in Newcastle, but grew up in Wollongong where he completed high school. He trained as a lawyer at the University of New South Wales, graduating with degrees in commerce (Marketing) and Law in 1993. He then worked for a number of years in government and private practice as a commercial litigator.

From 1999 to 2001, Grice studied theology at Sydney Missionary and Bible College, and an interest in rural ministry led him to become a candidate for ministry in the Anglican Diocese of Armidale. He was ordained deacon in 2001 and priest in 2002.

Grice commenced his first ministry appointment as a curate in Inverell on 14 January 2002. In 2003, after only a year as curate, the vicar of Inverell was appointed as an assistant to the bishop, so Grice was offered, and accepted the position of vicar, which he held until January 2015. During his time as vicar, in 2006 Grice was appointed to the Diocesan Council and in 2012 was collated as Archdeacon of the Macintyre.

In 2014, Grice was approached by Gary Nelson, Bishop of North West Australia and offered the position of Dean of Holy Cross Cathedral in Geraldton, which he accepted. He served as Dean from January 2015 until the end of 2020. During his time as Dean he became Vicar-General of the Diocese of North West Australia.

== Episcopal appointment ==
On 21 July 2020, Grice was appointed as the 13th Bishop of Rockhampton, succeeding David Robinson who had retired earlier in 2020. Grice was consecrated as bishop in St John's Cathedral, Brisbane on 24 February 2021, and installed as Bishop of Rockhampton in St Paul's Cathedral, Rockhampton on 27 February 2021.

== Personal life ==
Grice is married to Virginia and has five children.

Religious titles
Preceded by David Robinson	Bishop of Rockhampton; 2021–present	Incumbent
