= Frederick Hulton-Sams =

English priest

Frederick Edgar Barwick Hulton-Sams (Emberton, 23 November 1882 – Hooge, 31 July 1915) was an Anglican priest in the first two decades of the Twentieth Century.

Hulton-Sams was educated at Harrow and Trinity College, Cambridge, where he won the University Boxing Championship in 1901, 1902 and 1904. He was ordained deacon in 1905 and priest in 1908. After a curacy at St Paul, Balsall Heath he travelled to Australia to join the Bush Brotherhood. There his trademark was that after preaching at some remote rural location he would offer to fight any member of the congregation: this led to his nickname, "The Fighting Parson". When war came he could not obtain an Army Chaplaincy so he enlisted with the 3rd Bedfordshires. In November he was Commissioned into the Duke of Cornwall's Light Infantry. He died at Hooge on 31 July 1915.
