= Reginald Halse =

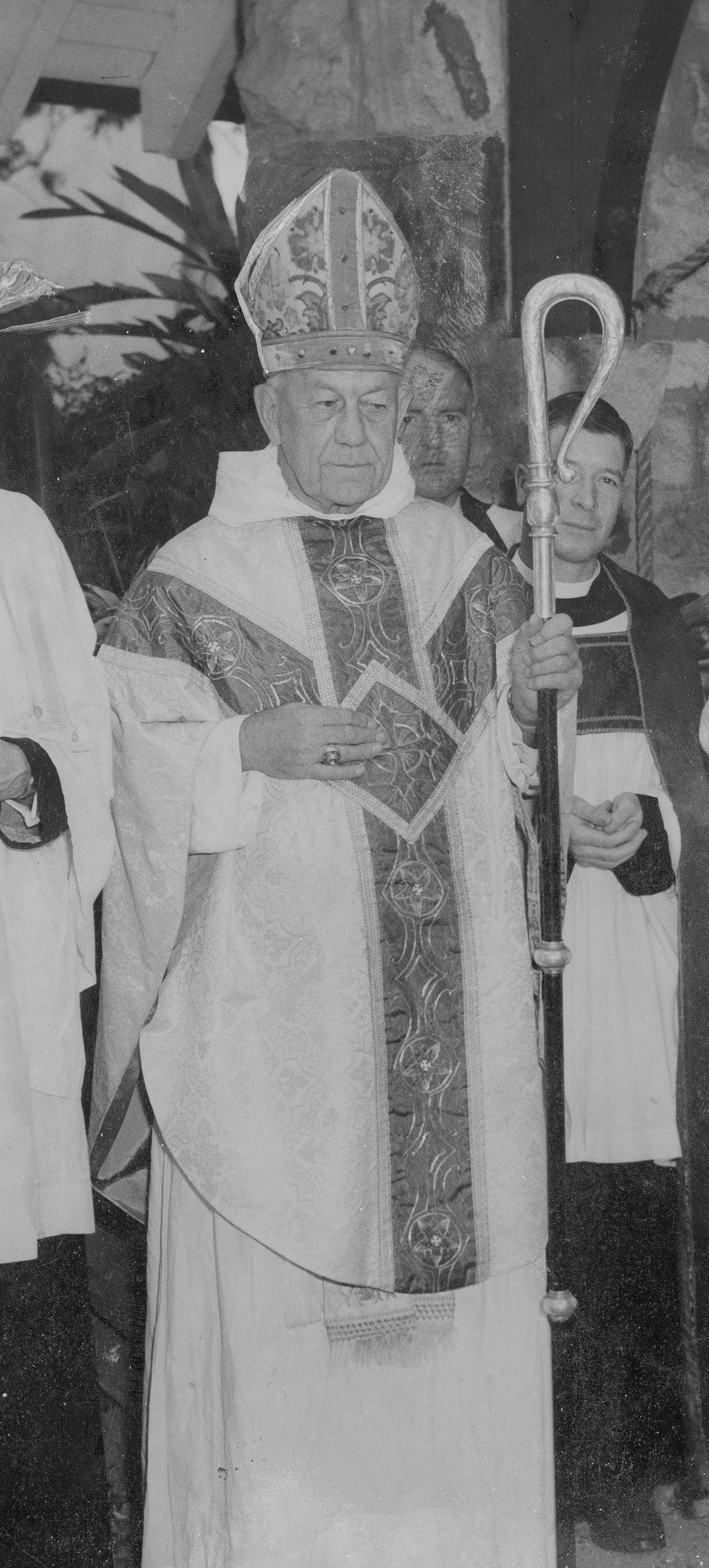
Archbishop Reginald Halse, 1954

Sir Reginald Charles Halse KBE CMG (16 June 1881 – 9 August 1962) was the Bishop of Riverina from 1925 to 1943 and then Archbishop of Brisbane until his death in 1962.

== Biography ==
Halse was educated at St Paul's School, London and Brasenose College, Oxford. He was ordained in 1906 and was an assistant priest at St Saviour's Poplar and then priest in charge of St Nicholas' Blackwall.

He then emigrated to Australia and was Warden of the Brotherhood of St Barnabas and then headmaster of All Souls' School, Charters Towers, Queensland until his ordination to the episcopate. Halse served as the Bishop of Riverna from 1925 to 1943, before becoming the Archbishop of Brisbane in 1943.

Halse was knighted in the Queen's New Years Honours of 1962. He died in office later that year, on 9 August 1962.

Anglican Communion titles
Preceded by Ernest Anderson	Bishop of Riverina; 1925 – 1943	Succeeded by Charles Murray
Preceded by William Wand	Archbishop of Brisbane; 1943 – 1962	Succeeded by Philip Strong
