= James Housden =

Australian Anglican bishop

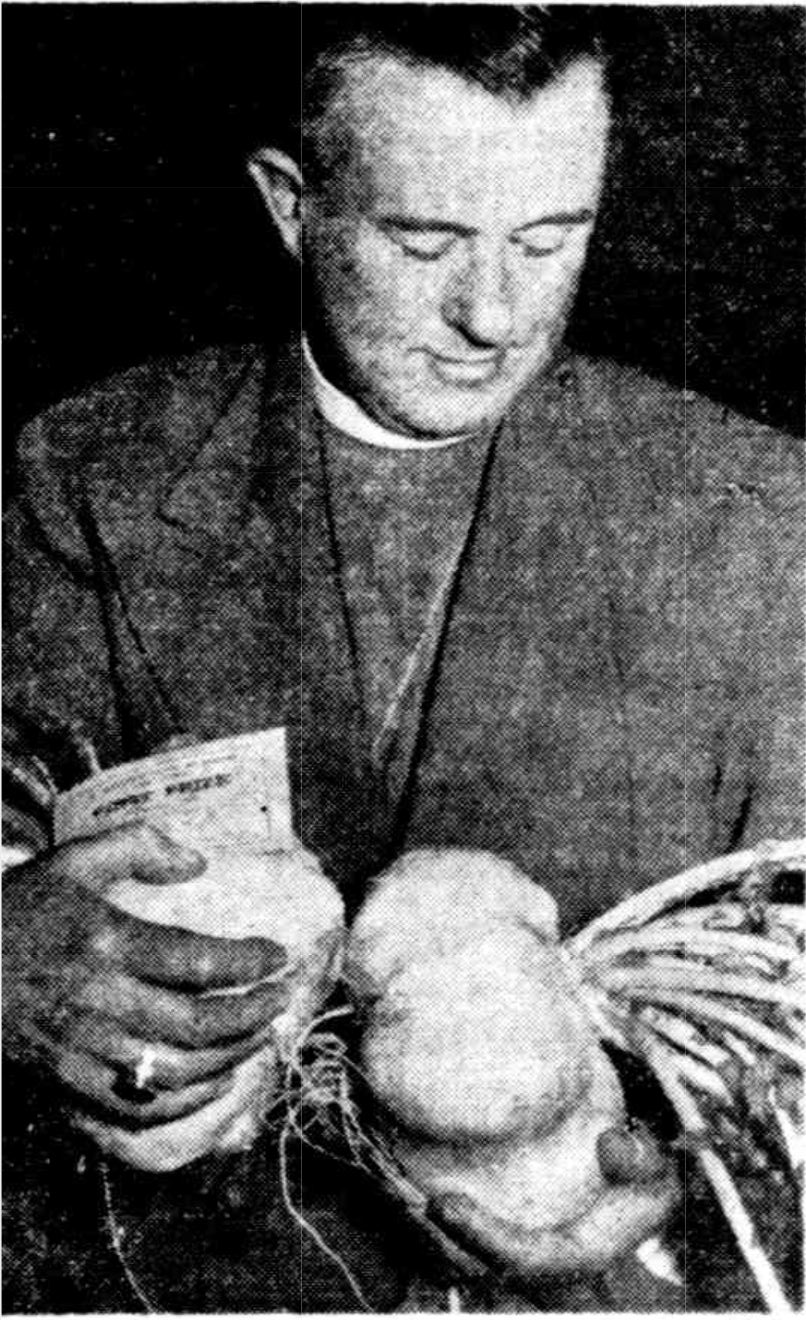
Bishop Housden inspecting two large turnips, Rockhampton, 1951

James Alan George Housden (16 September 1904 – 22 April 1994) was the fifth Anglican Bishop of Rockhampton in Queensland, Australia, serving from 1947 to 1958. In 1958 he then became the Bishop of Newcastle in New South Wales until 1972.

Housden was born in Birmingham and educated at Essendon High School and the University of Queensland before being ordained in 1929. His first position was as a curate at St Paul's Ipswich, Queensland after which he was chaplain of the Mitchell River Mission. He then became rector of Darwin, Northern Territory then vicar of Coolangatta. From 1940 to 1946 he was the Rural Dean of Warwick and finally (before his ordination to the episcopate) vicar of Christ Church, South Yarra.

Housden was consecrated a bishop on 28 October 1947 at St John's Cathedral (Brisbane). On Sunday 2 November 1947, he was enthroned at St Paul's Anglican Cathedral in Rockhampton.

In 1958, Housden translated from Rockhampton to Newcastle where he was enthroned on 21 November 1958, where he remained until his retirement due to poor health in 1972.

Anglican Communion titles
Preceded by Fortesque Ash	Bishop of Rockhampton; 1947–1958	Succeeded by Theodore McCall
Preceded by De Witt Batty	Bishop of Newcastle (Australia); 1958–1972	Succeeded by Ian Shevill
