= David Robinson (bishop) =

Australian bishop

The Right Reverend David Robinson
- Bishop of Rockhampton
- Church: Anglican Church of Australia
- Diocese: Rockhampton
- In office: 3 September 2014 – 22 February 2020
- Predecessor: Godfrey Fryar
- Successor: Peter Grice

Orders
- Ordination: 1994
- Consecration: 3 September 2014 by Phillip Aspinall

Personal details
- Denomination: Anglican
- Spouse: Jan
- Children: 2
- Education: St Mark's National Theological Centre

David Robinson is an Australian bishop in the Anglican Church of Australia. He served as the 12th Bishop of Rockhampton from 3 September 2014 to 22 February 2020.

== Early life and parish ministry ==
Robinson was born in the United Kingdom but emigrated to Adelaide in 1970. Prior to working in ministry he worked for the South Australian Government in water management, then moved to Canberra to study at St Mark's National Theological Centre.

During the 1980s Robinson worked with indigenous students in Darwin and worked in Bangladesh with the Anglican Board of Missions.

He was ordained in 1994 and until his ordination to the episcopate worked in the Diocese of Canberra and Goulburn in parishes in Gundagai, Kooringal and Curtin. Immediately prior to his appointment, Robinson was the National Formation Manager at St Mark's National Theological Centre.

== Episcopal ministry ==
In April 2014, Robinson was appointed as the next Bishop of Rockhampton, replacing Godfrey Fryar who had retired in 2013. He was consecrated and enthroned as bishop on 3 September 2014 in St Paul's Cathedral, Rockhampton, the first Bishop of Rockhampton to be consecrated in the city's cathedral.

As bishop, Robinson has had to deal with structural problems in the diocesan cathedral, St Paul's Cathedral in Rockhampton. The cathedral's roof was significantly damaged in Cyclone Marcia in February 2015 and closed for some time, but the cathedral was forced to close again after one wall suffered subsidence in 2017 while groundworks were being carried out. It was estimated that repairs would cost $10m to restore the cathedral. Works took place in late 2019 with the cathedral due to reopen in early 2020.

During the Australian Marriage Law Postal Survey in 2017, Robinson said he affirmed the doctrine of the Anglican Church of Australia that marriage was "a lifelong and exclusive union between a man and a woman", but acknowledged that the debate about same sex marriage was a "deeply personal and complex issue", that members of the LGBTI community "had not always felt welcomed, accepted and loved" and that he was "deeply sorry" for this.

Robinson's final service was on 22 February 2020.

== Personal life ==
Robinson is married to Jan, has two children, seven grandchildren, and one great-grandchild

Religious titles
| Preceded by Godfrey Fryar | Bishop of Rockhampton; 2014–2020 | Succeeded by Peter Grice |
