= St Paul's Anglican Cathedral Hall, Rockhampton =

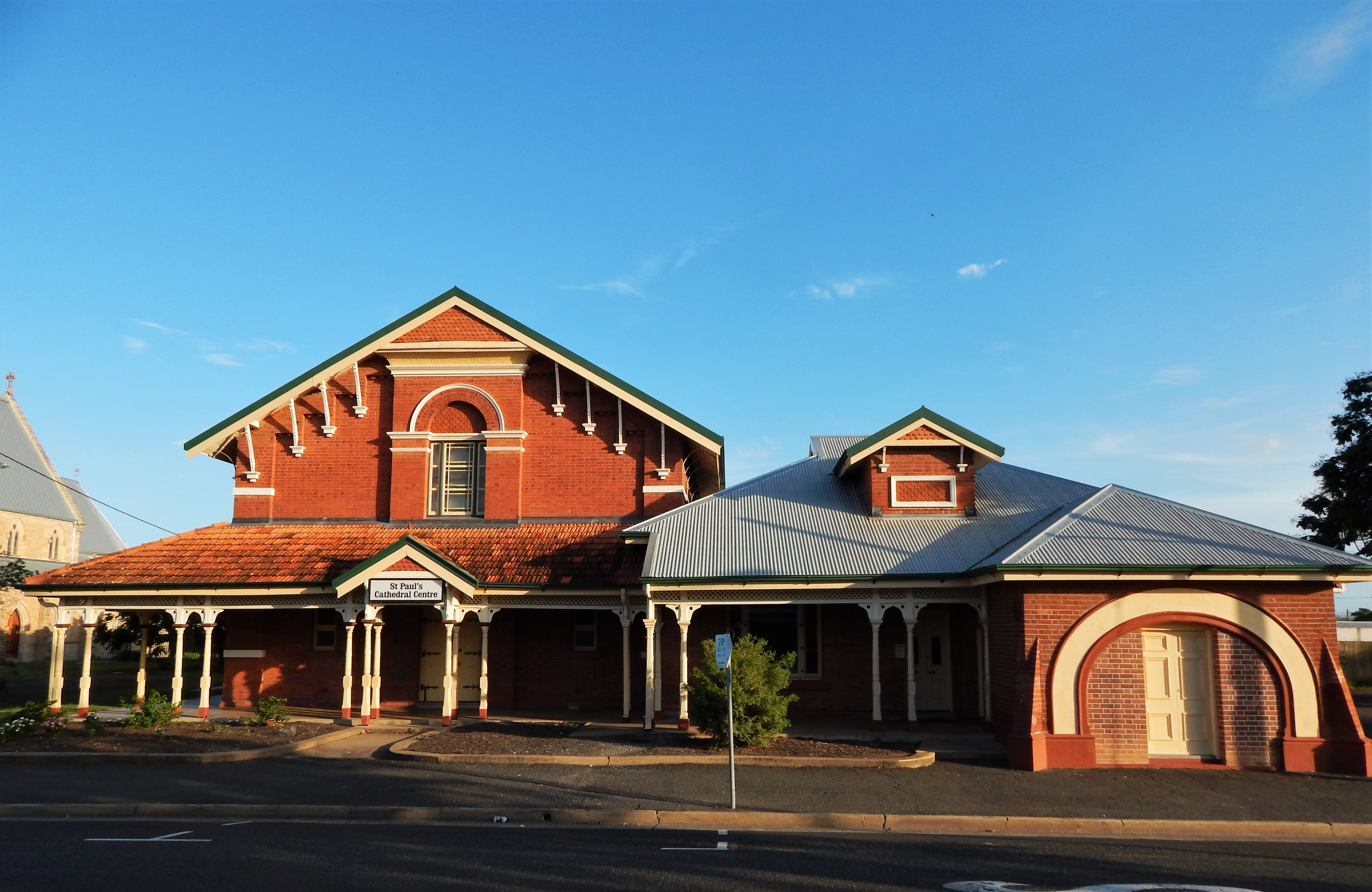
- St Paul's Anglican Cathedral Hall, 2020

- Location within Queensland Location within Australia
- 23.3821°S 150.5119°E
- Location: 89 William Street, Rockhampton, Rockhampton Region, Queensland, Australia

History
- Design period: 1900–1914 (early 20th century)
- Built: c. 1900

Site notes
- Architect: Louis Spier Robertson
- Architectural style: Arts & Crafts

Queensland Heritage Register
- Official name: St Pauls Cathedral Hall & Offices, St Paul's Anglican Cathedral Offices, St Paul's Anglican Cathedral Parish Hall, St Paul's Day School (1902–1912)
- Type: state heritage (landscape, built)
- Designated: 23 June 2000
- Reference no.: 601491
- Significant period: 1900s (historical) ongoing (social); 1900s (fabric)
- Significant components: views to, roof/ridge ventilator/s / fleche/s, hall

St Paul's Anglican Cathedral Hall is a heritage-listed church hall at 89 William Street, Rockhampton, Rockhampton Region, Queensland, Australia. It is adjacent to St Paul's Anglican Cathedral. It was designed by Louis Spier Robertson and built c. 1900. It is also known as St Paul's Anglican Cathedral Offices, St Paul's Anglican Cathedral Parish Hall, and St Paul's Day School (1902–1912). It was added to the Queensland Heritage Register on 23 June 2000.

== History ==
The first Anglican cleric to reach Rockhampton was Queensland's first Anglican Bishop, Bishop Edward Tufnell, in November 1860, though lay ministers held Anglican services in Rockhampton during the late 1850s. Following shortly after Tuffnell's visit, Reverend Thomas Jones arrived at Rockhampton, becoming the popular pioneer Anglican rector. Jones encouraged his congregation to raise sufficient funds in 1862 to allow construction of a small timber church to be built on what later became the site of the present Cathedral Hall.

Later more funds were raised for a new and larger church with plans drawn up and construction beginning on St Paul's Church in 1872, though this building was not completed and consecrated until 1883. In 1892 the Church of England Diocese of Rockhampton was formed and the St Paul's Church was upgraded becoming the Cathedral Church of Saint Paul the Apostle. The foundation bishop, the Right Reverend Nathaniel Dawes, was formally emplaced on 30 November 1892. In 1899, Louis Spier Robertson who designed the Cathedral Hall building, also designed the entrance gates constructed at Rockhampton's St Paul's Cathedral.

The St Paul's Cathedral Hall, a superb extant Federation style red brick building with wide verandas supported by turned wooden posts, was completed c. 1900. This new brick building was initially utilised by the Anglican Church at Rockhampton in the establishment of the Saint Paul's Day School which opened in 1901, and continued at this location until the end of 1912, after which these premises became known as the Parish Hall.

This building was designed in 1899 by Louis Spier Robertson (b. c.1869; d. 1932). Robertson was a Sydney architect and surveyor (c.1890–96), who moved to Rockhampton where he married Elizabeth Frances Leighton on 26 April 1896. Robertson began a successful architectural practice in Rockhampton at East Street from January 1897 until 1905 when he returned to Sydney. Despite this move, Robertson continued to undertake Queensland work, including later in partnership with his son (Louis S. Robertson and Son Architects). Another noted work by Robertson includes Nelson House (1910) in Sydney, which was the first self-supporting steel framed building erected in Australia.

== Description ==
St Paul's Anglican Cathedral Hall and Offices is a single storey red brick building, consisting of a hall and a wing of offices to the west. It is situated on the corner of William and Denison Streets, Rockhampton, addressing William Street to the north-west. To the north-east, across Alma Lane, is St Paul's Cathedral. The Hall is also near the Deanery and the Lodge.

The parish hall has a simple gabled roof, with timber brackets supporting the front overhang. Above the entry is a projecting bay with a window, pilasters, arched head and rendered cornice. Along the street facade is a verandah with turned timber posts, and a gabled entry portico.

This building is an example of an unorthodox use of classical elements, such as the arch at the central gable. The detailing and massing is influenced by Arts and Crafts movement and Queen Anne style.

This building has a conspicuous roof with prominent gable verge held by brackets at the gable. The tuck pointed face brickwork, turned timber posts, roof vent, terracotta details including plaque with a date, the large semicircular arch, and the roof form differentiates the hall from the offices.

== Heritage listing ==
St Paul's Anglican Cathedral Hall was listed on the Queensland Heritage Register on 23 June 2000 having satisfied the following criteria.

The place is important in demonstrating the evolution or pattern of Queensland's history.

The St Paul's Cathedral Hall and Offices demonstrates the evolution of Queensland's History, in this case the spread and development of the Anglican Church in regional Queensland at this important regional community of Rockhampton.

The place is important in demonstrating the principal characteristics of a particular class of cultural places.

The St Paul's Cathedral Hall demonstrates the principal characteristics influenced by the Arts and Crafts movement and Queen Anne style, with elements of unorthodox Classical style incorporated.

The place is important because of its aesthetic significance.

This building accordingly exhibits particular aesthetic characteristics associated with this style, as well as complementing the William Street streetscape and associated Anglican Church precinct, that includes the adjacent St Paul's Cathedral.

The place has a strong or special association with a particular community or cultural group for social, cultural or spiritual reasons.

This place has a strong association for social, cultural and spiritual reasons with the Church of England community of Rockhampton.

The place has a special association with the life or work of a particular person, group or organisation of importance in Queensland's history.

It has a special association with the work and history of the Anglican Church in regional Queensland, particularly from the establishment of the Diocese of Rockhampton in 1892 when this precinct became the seat of the Bishop of Rockhampton.
