= Barry Hunter (bishop) =

Australian Anglican bishop

Barry Russell Hunter AM (15 August 1927 – 28 July 2015) was the Anglican Bishop of Riverina, New South Wales from 1971 until 1992. He was a keen poet and a pilot.

Hunter was born in Brisbane on 15 August 1927, educated at Toowoomba Grammar School and the University of Queensland and ordained in 1953. His first post was as a curate at St Matthew's Sherwood after which he joined the Bush Brotherhood of St Paul at Cunnamulla. Later he was the Rector of St Gabriel's Biloela and then the Archdeacon of the East in the Diocese of Rockhampton.

== Episcopate ==
Elected 7th Bishop of Riverina in August 1971, he was consecrated at St Andrew's Cathedral, Sydney on 30 November and enthroned at Hay on 8 December 1971. During his episcopate he established the chaplaincy at Charles Sturt University, and the Church of St Alban, Griffith was consecrated as the Cathedral of the diocese.

In retirement, Hunter acted as priest in charge (locum tenens) of the parish of Cudal in the Diocese of Bathurst.

Hunter died in Tamworth on 28 July 2015.

== Honours ==
- Awarded the Order of Australia Medal for services to religion in 1992.
- Awarded Honorary Doctor of Letters, Charles Sturt University, 6 April 1995.

Religious titles
Preceded by John Grindrod	Bishop of Riverina; 1971–1992	Succeeded by Bruce Clark
