= The Bush Brother =

Religious quarterly journal

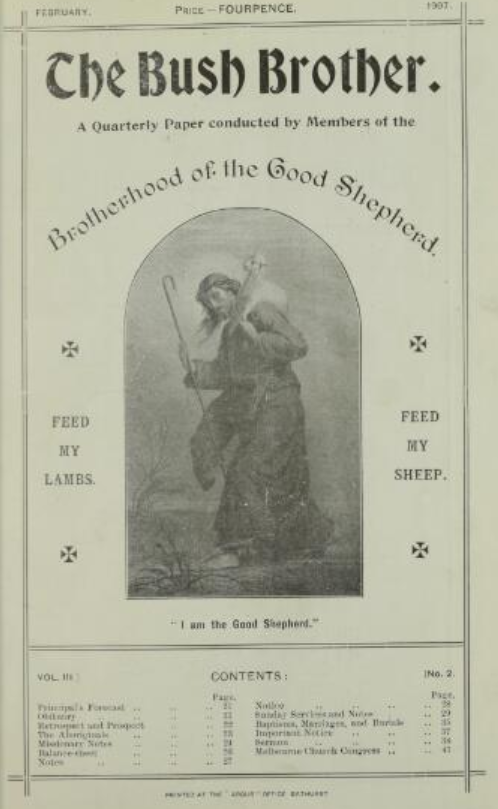
Front page of the February 1907 issue.

The Bush Brother was a quarterly English-language journal produced by the religious order of the Brotherhood of the Good Shepherd based in Dubbo, New South Wales, Australia. The focus of the publication was mainly religion and missionary work with issues often containing photographs of rural and remote areas of Australian and its people.

== Publication history ==
The Brotherhood of the Good Shepherd published The Bush Brother from 1904 to 1980. Frederick Henry Campion founded the journal in September 1904 and he described the focus of the publication as "...a quarterly magazine, issued to friends and subscribers in Australia and England, and to those who live in the districts we work. Its object is to describe the work of the Brotherhood for each quarter, recording baptisms and weddings, etc., giving a quarterly balance-sheet, and containing articles from the brethren describing their work for the past quarter. It will also contain a sermon and other spiritual help for those living in the bush."

It was originally priced at three pence an issue.

The Bush Brotherhood had its origins in the Bishop of Rockhampton's settlement at Longreach in Central Queensland known as St. Andrew's Bush Brotherhood. Its success led to the formation of three more Bush Brotherhoods at Herberton, Charleville and Dubbo.

== Digitisation ==
The Bush Brother has been digitised in Trove by the National Library of Australia.

== See also ==
- Bush Brotherhood also known as the Brotherhood of the Good Shepherd
