= Ernest Anderson (bishop) =

English Anglican bishop (1859-1945)

Ernest Augustus Anderson, DD (24 March 1859 – 5 April 1945) was an Anglican bishop in the late nineteenth and early 20th centuries.

Anderson was born in Milton Damerel, Devon, England and educated at Bedford School and Queens' College, Cambridge. He went to North Queensland as a mission preacher in 1882, and was ordained deacon the same year, and priest in 1883.

He was installed in Hay, New South Wales as the second Anglican Bishop of the Diocese of Riverina, New South Wales Australia, on 11 February 1896, at a time of financial difficulty for the church.

Because of the continuing drought and rabbit plague, station owners no longer had the means of supporting the church, which meant that clergy had to work for almost nothing. Anderson's episcopate was also a time of conflict between the bishop and his clergy and the clergy and their parishioners. In 1915 the Vicar of Broken Hill, the Rev Albert Frost, was cited to appear before Anderson on charges of false doctrine, having taught his confirmation candidates to make confession to a priest before taking communion, invocation of the Blessed Virgin Mary and the Saints, and other 'Romish' practices such as describing the main Sunday service as High Mass. This was reputedly the only Anglican heresy trial to take place in Australia. Although acquitted of heresy, under pressure from Anderson, Frost felt obliged to resign.

By the turn of the century, new towns were flourishing throughout the Riverina, as the growing wheat industry gave the district a much needed economic boost. Anderson retired from active ministry in 1925, leaving twice as many parishes in the diocese as he took over originally.

Religious titles
Preceded by Sydney Linton	Bishop of Riverina; 1895 –1925	Succeeded by Reginald Halse
