= William Barrett (priest) =

British–Australian Anglican Dean of Brisbane

William Edward Colvile Barrett (27 April 1880 – 29 June 1956) was the Anglican Dean of Brisbane in Queensland, Australia, from 1932 to 1952.

== Early life ==
The son of Sir William Scott Barrett, he was educated at Aldenham School and Pembroke College, Cambridge.

== Religious life ==
After a period of study at Leeds Clergy School, he was curate at All Hallows, Kirkburton. He was a member of the Bush Brotherhood in Charleville, Queensland, Australia within the Diocese of Brisbane from 1906 to 1912; Vicar of Gildersome from 1913, and a Chaplain to the BEF from 1917 to 1919. When peace returned he became the Organising Secretary for the SPG for North West England until 1922 when he returned to Australia as Rector of Sherwood, a post he held for eight years. He was then Warden of St John's College at the University of Queensland until his appointment as Dean of Brisbane.
