= Ron Stone (bishop) =

Australian bishop (born 1938)

Ronald Francis Ron Stone AM (born 10 September 1938) is a retired Australian bishop. He was the 10th Bishop of Rockhampton in the Anglican Church of Australia from 1996 to 2003.

Stone was educated at Taylors College, Melbourne and ordained in 1963. His first post was as a curate at Junee, after which he was priest in charge of Kameruka. He was rector of Kerang and then the Archdeacon of Bendigo. He was ordained to the episcopate as an assistant bishop in Tasmania before becoming Bishop of Rockhampton in 1996; he was installed there on 13 December 1996. He retired from this position in 2003. He is married to Lisbeth Stone.

Anglican Communion titles
Preceded by George Hearn	Bishop of Rockhampton; 1996–2003	Succeeded by Godfrey Fryar
