= George Hearn (bishop) =

Australian Anglican bishop

George Arthur Hearn (17 November 1935 – 8 September 2022) was the ninth Anglican Bishop of Rockhampton from 1981 until 1996.

Hearn was educated at Northcote High School and ordained in 1964. His first post was as a curate at Traralgon after which he was vicar of Omeo. He held further incumbencies at Wonthaggi and Kyabram before administrative posts within the Diocese of Melbourne. He was consecrated a bishop on 30 April 1981, to serve as Bishop of Rockhampton. He resigned his See effective 18 March 1996. He has studied at La Trobe University.

== Bicentenary comments ==
Hearn is known for comments he made in 1988 about the Australian Bicentenary celebrations. In his address to the 54th synod of the Anglican Diocese of Rockhampton, he described the celebrations as an "historical absurdity". Hearn said aspects of Australian life had become blurred amid the hype of the bicentenary which he said failed to recognise 40,000 years of Aboriginal culture, which was why there had been protests about the event.

He remarked: "Any celebration which fails to recognise 40,000 years of Aboriginal life and culture in Australia is, of course, an historical absurdity... It is no wonder that this cumulative injustice dating from the time of European settlement until now should have occasioned a militant response among some of the Aboriginal community... There is a racism that lurks within the Australian consciousness and is fuelled by an uneasy conscience caused by our treatment of Aborigines in the past and our fear for the future."

Religious titles
Preceded by John Grindrod	Bishop of Rockhampton; 1981 – 1996	Succeeded by Ron Stone
