= Hector Robinson =

Hector Gordon Robinson (9 June 1899 - 9 December 1965) was the Anglican Bishop of Riverina in Australia from 1950 until his death in 1965.

Robinson was educated at Scotch College, Melbourne, The Australian College of Theology and Trinity College, University of Melbourne. He was ordained in 1923 and was a curate at St Peter's, Eastern Hill, Melbourne and then priest in charge of Boort. He was Rector of Home Hill and then of St Matthew's Townsville before becoming Archdeacon of Mackay until his appointment to the episcopate.

Religious titles
Preceded by Charles Murray	Bishop of Riverina; 1950 – 1965	Succeeded by John Grindrod
