= Sydney Linton =

1st Anglican Bishop of Riverina

Sydney Linton (2 July 1841 – 15 May 1894) was the first Anglican Bishop of Riverina.

== Life ==
The son of the Rev. Henry Linton, Vicar of St Peter-le-Bailey, Oxford, he was educated at Wadham College, Oxford, ordained in 1867 and held incumbencies at Holy Trinity, Oxford, and St Philip, Norwich (from 1877 until his elevation to the episcopate). He played first-class cricket at Oxford for the university club.

Linton was consecrated on 1 May 1884 at St Paul's Cathedral, London, and on 15 January 1885 he set sail for Australia with his family. Upon his arrival he travelled through Melbourne, Sydney and Goulburn before travelling west to Hay, the site of the proposed bishopric. Linton was formally installed as the Bishop of Riverina in the old St Paul's Church at Hay by the incumbent, the Reverend James Macarthur, on 18 March 1885. The new St Paul's Church – the pro-cathedral of the new diocese – was completed by the end of 1885.

Throughout his service, Linton toured extensively around the Riverina diocese's parishes and was instrumental in setting up the first synod for the Church of England in Australia in 1887. Linton made the last of his journeys throughout the diocese during 1894, before suddenly falling ill. He died later in Melbourne. The second diocesan bishop found the diocese in a somewhat ailing financial state.

== Family ==
Linton married Isabella, eldest daughter of Charles Abel Heurtley. His brother, Henry, was also a first-class cricketer. He was the great grandfather of Martin Linton, who was the Member of Parliament for Battersea in London, England, from 1997 to 2010.

== Notes ==
Religious titles
Preceded by Inaugural appointment	Bishop of Riverina; 1884–1895	Succeeded by Ernest Anderson
