= Godfrey Fryar =

Australian bishop (born 1950)

Godfrey Charles Fryar (born 5 February 1950) was the eleventh Bishop of Rockhampton in the Anglican Church of Australia.

== Early life ==
Fryar was educated at All Souls' Charters Towers.

== Religious life ==
Fryar and ordained in 1973. He was a Bush Brother until 1976 after which he held incumbencies in Rockhampton, Mackay and Stafford, Queensland. From 1993 to 1998 he was Dean of St Saviour's Cathedral, Goulburn. On 13 December 1998, he was consecrated a bishop at St Saviour's Cathedral, Goulburn, to serve as Assistant Bishop in the Diocese of Canberra and Goulburn and installed as Rector of St John's Church Wagga Wagga. In 2003 he returned to the Diocese of Rockhampton as diocesan bishop. He retired as Bishop of Rockhampton on 13 December 2013, ten years to the day that he was appointed and fifteen since his consecration.

Religious titles
Preceded by Ron Stone	Bishop of Rockhampton; 2003–2013	Succeeded by David Robinson
