= Charles Murray (bishop) =

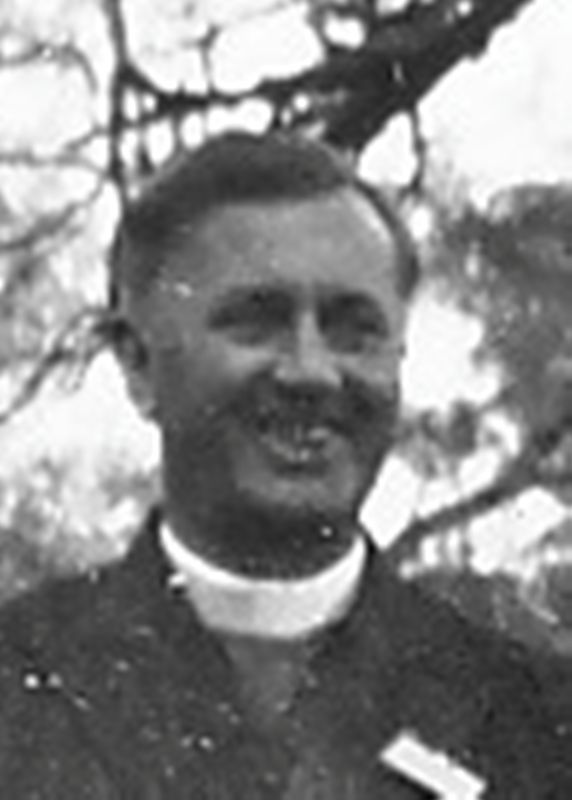

Charles Herbert Murray (21 September 1899 – 26 June 1950) was the Anglican Bishop of Riverina in Australia from 1944 until his death in the 1950 Australian National Airways Douglas DC-4 crash in Western Australia. Also killed was Norman Blow, Dean of Newcastle.

Murray was educated at Wesley College, Melbourne, Trinity College, University of Melbourne and Christ Church, Oxford. He was ordained in 1923 and was a curate at St Dunstan's Camberwell and then priest in charge of Christ Church, Brunswick. He was Rector of Christ Church, North Adelaide from 1933 to 1938 and then Vicar of Christ Church, South Yarra until his appointment to the episcopate. He was consecrated a bishop on 2 February 1944 at St Andrew's Cathedral, Sydney.

Religious titles
Preceded by Reginald Halse	Bishop of Riverina; 1944–1950	Succeeded by Hector Robinson
