= Philip Crick =

Australian bishop (1882–1937)

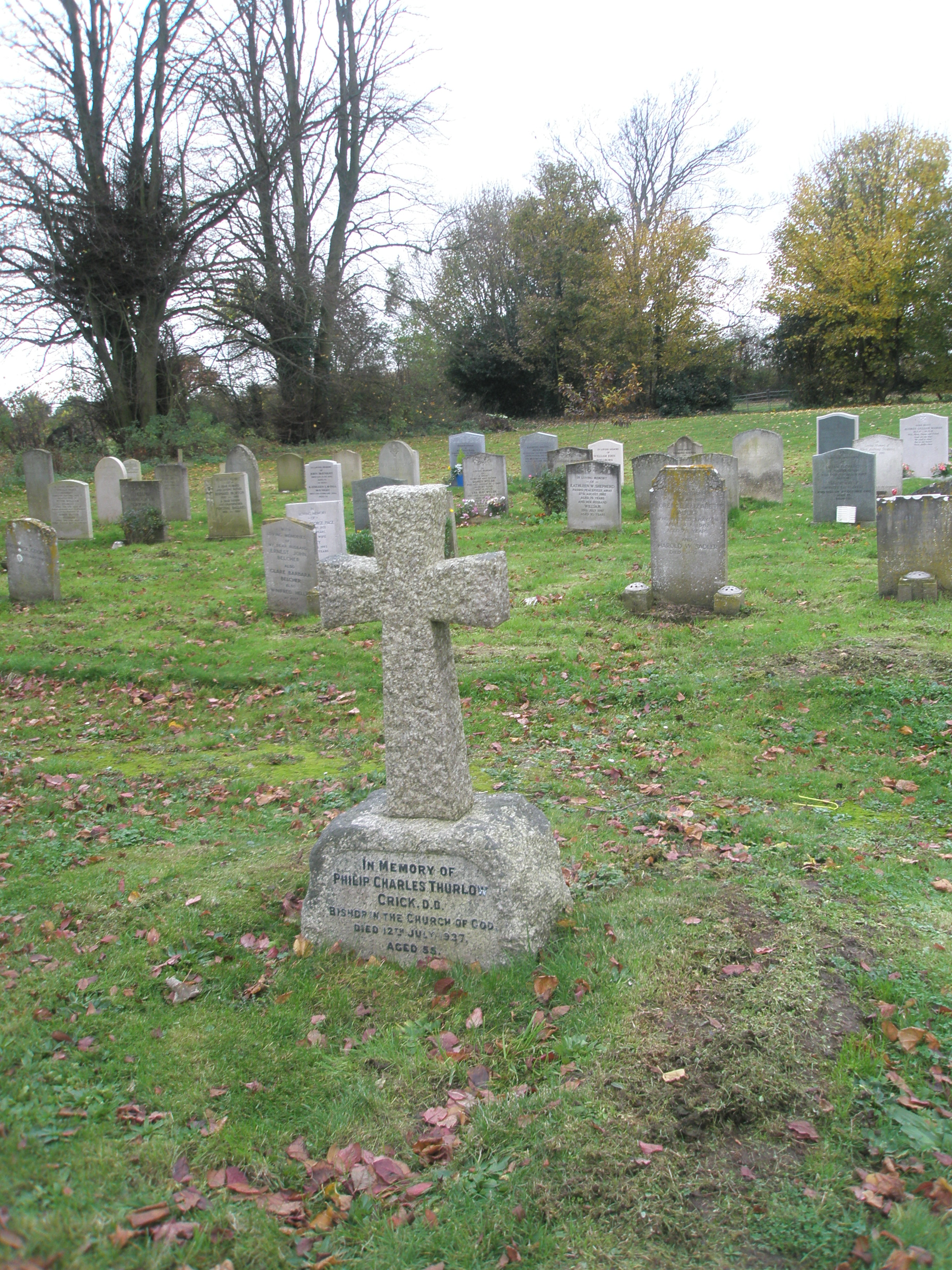
Crick's grave at Funtington

Philip Charles Thurlow Crick (1882-1937) was the Anglican Bishop of Rockhampton in Australia from 1921 until 1927 and the Bishop of Ballarat until 1935.

== Family ==
Crick was born into a clerical family on 18 November 1882, the eldest child of the Reverend Philip Crick (he took the same name as his father), the founder and first Headmaster (1883-1909) of St Ronan's School.

PCT Crick’s clerical relations included the Rev’d Thomas Crick (great grandfather), the Rev’d Henry William Crick (grandfather), the Rev’d Philip Crick (father), the Rev’d Frederick William Crick (uncle), and the Rev’d John Henry Crick (uncle). His only brother, Douglas Crick, was also ordained, and eventually became the Bishop of Chester.

== Education ==
He was educated at St Ronan’s, his father’s own school, which was then located at Worthing in Sussex. Aged 12 he won scholarships to both Harrow School and Winchester College, taking up the latter place. Later he won a scholarship to Pembroke College, Cambridge, where he took the top rank in the 1904 Cambridge Classical Tripos. At 6 feet 3 inches, he was a good footballer and tennis player.

== Career ==
His first ministry position was as a curate at St Mary's Church, Barnsley after which he was appointed Fellow and then Dean of Clare College, Cambridge. He became an Army Chaplain with the Territorial Force in 1913, was in France on active service from 1915 to 1919, and ended the Great War as Deputy Assistant Chaplain-General to VI Corps. From 1917, he had special responsibility for the Tank chaplains.

In 1921 Crick became one of the earliest First World War chaplains to be appointed to a bishopric, in the Diocese of Rockhampton in Australia. During his time as bishop he founded St Peter's Boys School in Barcaldine, and St Faith's Girls School in Yeppoon.

While in England in 1935, senior staff in his diocese of Ballarat wrote to the Archbishop of Canterbury requesting Crick’s removal from his post. Archbishop Lang sympathised with Crick but, for practical reasons, they decided that Crick should resign, and Lang arranged for Crick's appointment as Assistant Bishop of Derby. However, Crick died suddenly in 1937, and is buried at St Mary's, Funtington, West Sussex.

== Private life ==
Crick was a Freemason under the jurisdiction of the United Grand Lodge of England. It is an interest he shared with his brother and fellow-bishop Douglas Crick.

Anglican Communion titles
Preceded by George Douglas Halford	Bishop of Rockhampton; 1921 – 1927	Succeeded by Fortesque Leo Ash
Preceded by Maxwell Homfray Maxwell-Gumbleton	Bishop of Ballarat; 1927 – 1935	Succeeded by William Johnson
