= Donald Kirk (bishop) =

Australian Anglican bishop

The Right Reverend Donald Kirk
- Bishop of Riverina
- Church: Anglican Church of Australia
- Diocese: Diocese of Riverina
- Predecessor: Rob Gillion

Orders
- Consecration: 15 June 2019 by Glenn Davies

Personal details
- Denomination: Anglican
- Spouse: Camryn
- Children: 2

Donald Kingsley Kirk is an Australian Anglican bishop. Since June 2019 he has been the Bishop of Riverina in the Anglican Church of Australia.

Kirk trained for ordination at St John's College, Morpeth, and was ordained in 1986. His first ministry appointment in charge of a parish was in 1989 in Mount Vincent, near Cessnock in New South Wales. He served as Dean of Grafton from 2008 until 2017, then served as rector of the Parish of Hamilton and Archdeacon of the Southwest in the Anglican Diocese of Ballarat until his election as bishop.

Kirk was installed as Bishop of Riverina on 15 June 2019 at St Alban the Martyr Cathedral, Griffith.

As bishop, during the intense drought in the Riverina region, Kirk criticised the water market in the Murray-Darling Basin and called for water to be recognised as not only a commercial commodity but a physical and spiritual fundamental.

Kirk is married to Camryn and has a son and daughter.

Anglican Communion titles
Preceded by Rob Gillion	Bishop of Riverina; 2014 to 2018	Incumbent
