= Fortescue Ash =

Australian Anglican bishop

Fortescue Ash.

Fortescue Leo Ash (1882–1956) was the fourth Anglican Bishop of Rockhampton in Australia from 1928 until 1946.

Ash was born in Singleton, New South Wales on 26 August 1882 educated at St. Paul's College, Sydney. He trained for ordination at St John's College, Armidale and was ordained deacon in 1908 and priest in 1910. His first post was as a curate at St Anne's Strathfield, New South Wales after which he was rector of Ravenswood, Queensland before wartime service as a chaplain with the Australian Imperial Force (AIF). He was then appointed rector of Mackay, Queensland where he remained until his ordination to the episcopate. He died on 22 April 1956.

Anglican Communion titles
Preceded by Philip Charles Thurlow Crick	Bishop of Rockhampton; 1928 – 1946	Succeeded by James Alan George Housden
