= Anglican Diocese of Riverina =

Diocese of the Anglican Church of Australia

Diocese of Riverina
- Coat of arms

Location
- Country: Australia
- Ecclesiastical province: New South Wales
- Metropolitan: Archbishop of Sydney
- Coordinates: 34°44′S 146°33′E

Information
- Denomination: Anglican
- Established: 1884
- Cathedral: St Alban's Cathedral, Griffith

Current leadership
- Parent church: Anglican Church of Australia
- Bishop: Donald Kirk
- Dean: Thomas Leslie

Website
- anglicanriverina.com

The Diocese of Riverina is one of 23 dioceses of the Anglican Church of Australia. The diocese covers 37% of New South Wales, including the Riverina and the far west of the state. The diocese was established in 1884 when the Diocese of Goulburn was divided.

== Parishes and ministry ==
The diocese has 23 parishes and covers main population centres of Griffith, Broken Hill, Deniliquin, Leeton, Narrandera and Corowa.

However, only 15 of the parishes have full-time clergy. In 2003 funding pressures lead the diocese to a joint funding arrangement with the Diocese of Canberra and Goulburn and the Diocese of Bathurst for several ministry services.

== List of diocesan bishops ==
Bishops of Riverina
Ordinal	Incumbent	Term start	Term end	Time in office	Notes
1	Sydney Linton	1884	1895	10–11 years	Linton established the see and cathedra in Hay and was instrumental in setting up the first synod for the Church of England in Australia in 1887.
2	Ernest Anderson	1895	1925	29–30 years	Despite his episcopacy being dogged by prolonged drought and financial hardship, Bishop Andserson managed to double the nunmber of parishes in the diocese.
3	Sir Reginald Charles Halse CMG, KBE	1925	1943	17–18 years	On completion of his term, Halse was translated to Archbishop of Brisbane.
4	Charles Herbert Murray	1944	1950	5–6 years	Bishop Murray was consecrated bishop on 2 February 1944. Together with Norman Blow, the Dean of Newcastle, he was killed on 26 June 1950 when the A.N.A. Skymaster "Amana" crashed on a return flight from Perth.
5	Hector Robinson	1951	1965	13–14 years	In 1953 Bishop Robinson transferred the administrative centre of the diocese to Narrandera, with accommodation for the bishop and registry. Hay, however, remained the site of the pro-cathedral of the diocese.
6	Sir John Grindrod	1966	1971	4–5 years	Bishop Grindrod, an Englishman, came to Riverina via Queensland. He travelled widely to the remote parts of the diocese (in a small VW Beetle) and was a keen bird-spotter. He later became Bishop of Rockhampton, Archbishop of Brisbane and Primate of the Anglican Church of Australia. He died in January 2009.
7	Barry Hunter	1972	1992	19–20 years	Bishop Hunter was a keen poet and the first and only pilot-bishop of the diocese, flying a Cessna across the diocese for many years. He developed strategies to help lesson the sense of isolation of parishes and clergy. During the centenary year of the diocese, the church of St Alban in Griffith was designated as the cathedral. In 1992 St Martin's College was established as an Anglican residential college at Charles Sturt University in Wagga Wagga by both the Riverina and Canberra-Goulburn dioceses.
8	Bruce Quentin Clark	1993	2004	10–11 years	Bishop Clarke served the wider church as chairperson of the Provincial Education Committee. During his episcopacy the financial base of the diocese was strengthened by the establishment of the Riverina Anglican Foundation and the receipt of the Faulks bequest.
9	Douglas Stevens	2005	2012	6–7 years	Bishop Stevens was consecrated and enthroned as the ninth bishop of the diocese on 29 November 2005 at the Cathedral Church of St Alban the Martyr, Griffith. He formerly served in the Newcastle and Grafton dioceses in the parishes of Toronto, Merriwa, Newcastle Cathedral, Bolton Point, Wingham, Nambucca Heads and Tweed Heads. He is married to Denise (née Hull) and they have two daughters, Aisling and Erin. He served the wider church as Anglican co-chair of AUSTARC (the Australian Anglican and Roman Catholic dialogue group) and the New South Wales Provincial Education Commission. Stevens resigned as the Bishop of Riverina on 11 November 2012.
10	Alan Robert "Rob" Gillion	2014	2018	3-4 years	Bishop Gillion, formerly the Rector of Upper Chelsea in London, England, based at Holy Trinity Sloane Street, was consecrated and installed at Griffith Cathedral on 15 August 2014.
11	Donald Kirk	2019	2026	6–7 years	Most recently rector of Hamilton in the Diocese of Ballarat, and Dean of Grafton prior to that.

== Cathedral ==
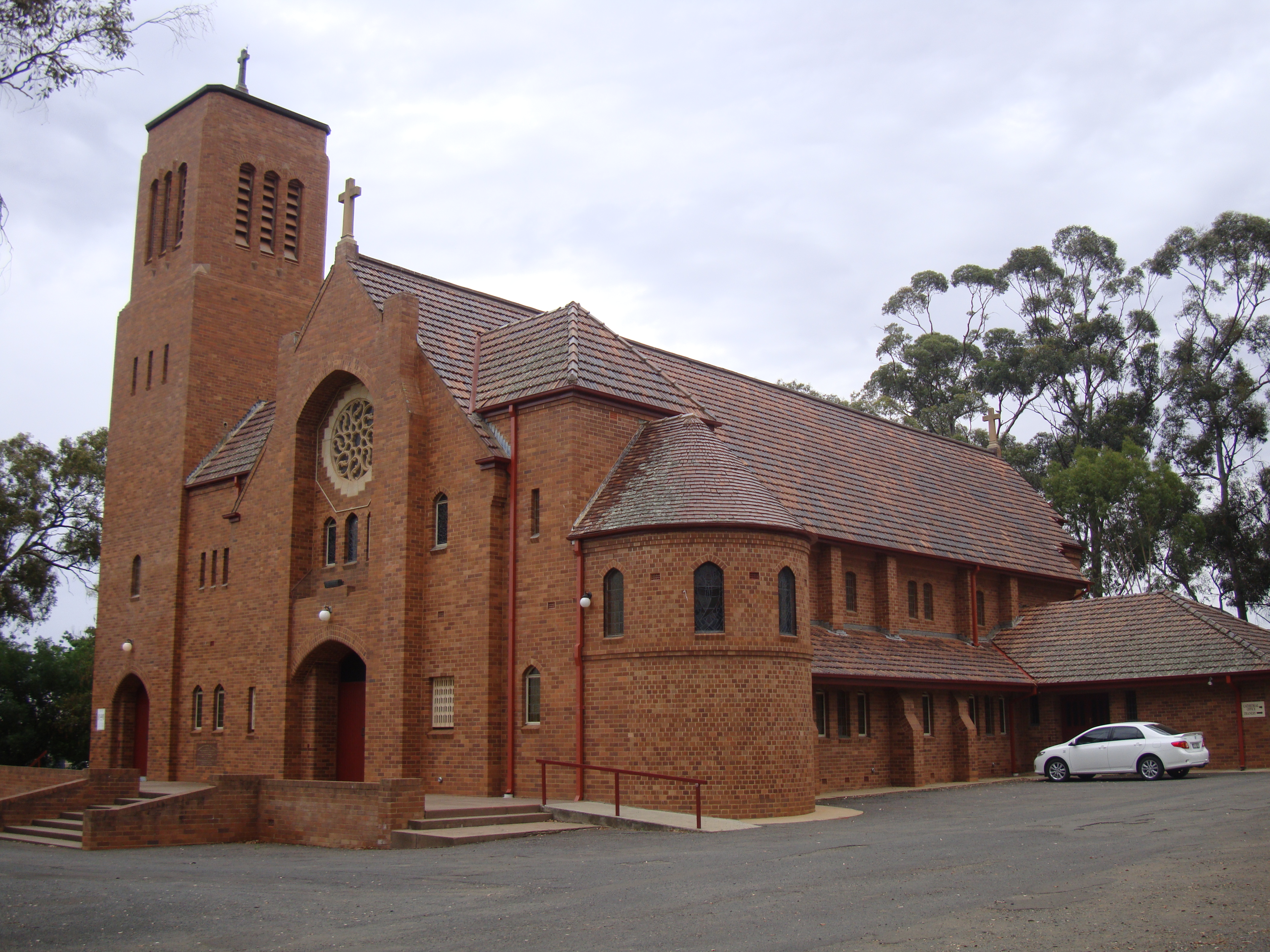
St Alban's Cathedral

St Alban's Cathedral in Griffith is the cathedral of the diocese. Initial ground work for the cathedral building begun as early as 1937, but substantive construction was not until 1954 and the foundation stone being laid in 1954. However, the building did not actually become the cathedral until 1984 as part of the diocese's centenary celebrations.

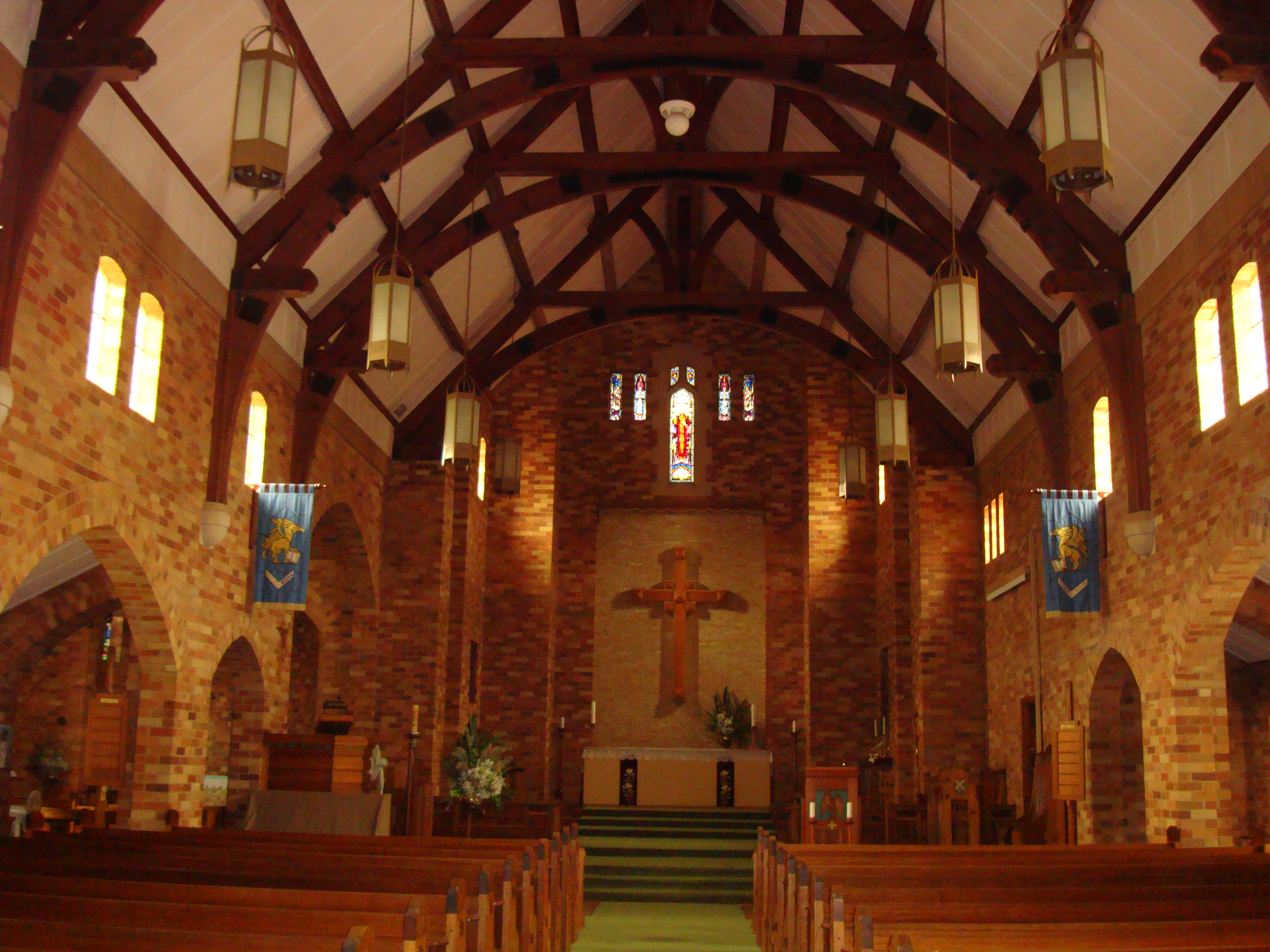
Cathedral interior

The cathedral was invested in honour of the World War II fallen and in 1956 the Archbishop of Brisbane dedicated the cathedral's honour roll.

== Parishes ==
- St John's Anglican Church, Wentworth

Christ The King Anglican Church (Hillston) St Peters Anglican Church (Leeton)
