= Bruce Clark (bishop) =

Anglican Bishop in Australia

Bruce Quinton Clark (born 22 May 1939) was the Anglican Bishop of Riverina in Australia from 1993 until 2004.

Clark was educated at Brisbane Boys' College and ordained in 1963. His first post was as a curate at All Saints' Chermside. He then had incumbencies at St Luke's Miles, St Matthew's Gayndah and St Peter's Gympie. After this he was the Archdeacon of Wide Bay and then Moreton before his ordination to the episcopate: he was consecrated a bishop on 11 June 1993. He is married to Betty Clark.

Religious titles
Preceded by Barry Hunter	Bishop of Riverina; 1993–2004	Succeeded by Douglas Stevens
