= Douglas Stevens =

Australian bishop

Douglas Robert Stevens is an Australian bishop. He was the Bishop of Riverina in the Anglican Church of Australia from 2005 to 2012. He is currently in parish ministry in Brisbane.

== Life and career ==
Stevens was born in Wollongong, New South Wales. He grew up in Gateshead, Newcastle. He was drawn to the church as a boy and felt called to ordained ministry after high school. After initially studying commerce and working for Fell & Starkey (chartered accountants) he completed a BA in education, classics and philosophy at the University of Newcastle and then studied theology at St John's College, Morpeth.

Ordained in 1979, Stevens had ministry positions in Newcastle, Merriwa, Wingham, Nambucca Heads and Tweed Heads. He completed a master's degree in ecumenical theology at Trinity College Dublin in Ireland in 1985.

=== Bishop of Riverina ===
In 2005, Stevens was elected as the Bishop of Riverina. He was consecrated as a bishop on 29 November 2005.

Stevens received his Doctor of Ministry degree from the Melbourne College of Divinity in 2006.

Stevens attended the Lambeth Conference in 2008. He was a member of the Australian Anglican Bishops' Conference.

Stevens resigned as the Bishop of Riverina on 11 November 2012. He was inducted as rector of the parish of Mt Gravatt in the Diocese of Brisbane on 1 December 2012.

Religious titles
Preceded by Bruce Clark	Bishop of Riverina; 2005 – 2012	Succeeded by Rob Gillion
