= Rob Gillion =

British Anglican bishop & former actor

The Right Reverend Rob Gillion
- Bishop of Riverina
- Church: Anglican Church of Australia
- Diocese: Riverina
- Installed: 15 August 2014
- Term ended: 21 July 2018
- Predecessor: Douglas Stevens
- Successor: Donald Kirk
- Other posts: Vicar of Streatham (Christ Church) and Associate Bishop for the Arts (Southwark, 2020–present)

Orders
- Ordination: 1984
- Consecration: 15 August 2014 by Glenn Davies

Personal details
- Born: 7 September 1951 (age 75)
- Denomination: Anglican
- Spouse: Janine
- Children: 2 sons
- Education: University of London; Salisbury and Wells Theological College

Alan Robert Gillion (born 7 September 1951) is a British Anglican bishop and former actor. From 2014 to 2018 he was the Bishop of Riverina in the Anglican Church of Australia.

== Early life ==
Gillion was born in Norfolk to clergy parents and was educated at Norwich School. He trained in acting at the University of London and then worked as an actor and theatre director for 12 years, participating in a variety of stage shows including cabaret, repertory and Shakespeare productions, prior to retraining for ministry at the age of 32.

== Ordained ministry ==
Gillion trained for ministry at Salisbury and Wells Theological College and was ordained Church of England: made deacon at Petertide 1983 (26 June) and ordained priest the following Petertide (1 July 1984) — both times by Maurice Wood, Bishop of Norwich, at Norwich Cathedral. His early ministry saw him serve in the Diocese of Southwark and then the Diocese of Hong Kong and Macao, where, as parish priest at Discovery Bay he voluntarily spent a week incarcerated at Shek Pik Prison to better understand his ministry as chaplain to the prisoners, who nicknamed him Father Robbery. He was also the diocese's head of religious broadcasting.

He returned to London in 1998, where he served first as the evangelism officer for the Bishop of Kensington, then as rector of Holy Trinity, Sloane Street, and St Saviour, Upper Chelsea. During his time in London, Gillion was a regular contributor to the BBC's Pause for Thought program, and also served as chaplain at Harrods.

=== Episcopal ministry ===
In April 2014, Gillion was elected Bishop of Riverina in the Province of New South Wales in the Anglican Church of Australia after a representative of the diocese saw him preach at St Paul's Cathedral, London (which was the only time he had ever preached there). He was consecrated and enthroned on 15 August 2014 at St Alban's Cathedral, Griffith. In working in Australia, Gillion followed in the footsteps of his grandfather who had worked as a priest in Broome and Derby in Western Australia during the 1920s.

During his time as Bishop of Riverina, Gillion performed a one-man stage show about faith to raise funds for a youth theatre project in the diocese. He also called on denominational churches to combine in disadvantaged rural areas to improve ministry resources. Gillion served as bishop from 15 August 2014 until resigning effective 21 July 2018.

=== Return to England ===
After his resignation Gillion returned to the United Kingdom and in March 2019 he was appointed as an honorary assistant bishop in the Diocese of Lincoln and interim priest-in-charge of St John the Baptist Spalding, for an 18-month term.

On 19 August 2020, Gillion was licensed as priest-in-charge of Christ Church Streatham and an honorary assistant bishop in the Diocese of Southwark; on 10 September he was commissioned as Associate Bishop for the Arts (in that diocese); and in 2021 the status of his parish post was changed to vicar.

Bishop Rob retired from parochial duties in 2024. He now holds the honorary title of Chaplain to Lord Salisbury at Hatfield House.

== Personal life ==
Gillion is married to Janine and has two sons, one of whom is the marketing manager for the Australian Grand Prix.

Anglican Communion titles
Preceded by Douglas Stevens	Bishop of Riverina; 2014–2018	Succeeded by Donald Kirk
