= Sydney Missionary and Bible College =

Sydney, Australia based Independent, Evengilical, and Interdenominational Bible College

Sydney Missionary & Bible College
- Motto: Lux in tenebris lucet
- Motto in English: Light shines in darkness
- Type: University
- Established: 1916
- Religious affiliation: Evangelicalism
- Academic affiliations: Inter-denominational
- Chairman: Mr. James Lane
- Principal: Dr. Derek Brotherson
- Location: Sydney, Australia
- Website: www.smbc.edu.au

Sydney Missionary and Bible College (SMBC) is an evangelical, interdenominational Bible college in Sydney, New South Wales, Australia. It was founded in 1916 in Croydon by Charles Benson Barnett and his wife Elizabeth, both former missionaries with the China Inland Mission (now OMF), to train people for cross-cultural missionary service and pastoral ministry.

SMBC's faculty, staff and students represent a wide range of Bible-centred denominations. The student body is roughly evenly divided between men and women, and comes from across Australia and around the world.

The college operates two campuses in Sydney's inner west, at Croydon and Croydon Park, and is a member college of the Australian University of Theology. SMBC places an emphasis on study in community and offers on-campus accommodation. Full-time, part-time and online study options are available. As of 2020, the principal was Derek Brotherson.

== History ==
Barnett wrote in 1916, "not only are we a Bible College, but we are a Missionary College ... we are taught by Christ, that we are to pray to the Lord of the Harvest that He will send forth labourers into His harvest field".

In 2016 a centennial history of SMBC was written by the Rev Anthony Brammall, who is the Vice-Principal at the college and a lecturer in New Testament.

== Principals ==
- Charles Benson Barnett (founder and principal 1916–1941)
- Wilfred Porter (principal 1942–1945)
- Terry (J.T.H.) Kerr (principal 1946–1964)
- Arthur Deane (principal 1965–1974)
- Howard Green (principal 1975–1983)
- Ray Wheeler (acting principal 1984–1985)
- David Cook (principal 1986–2011)
- Stuart Coulton (principal 2012–2019)
- Derek Brotherson (principal 2020–present)
