= George Halford (bishop) =

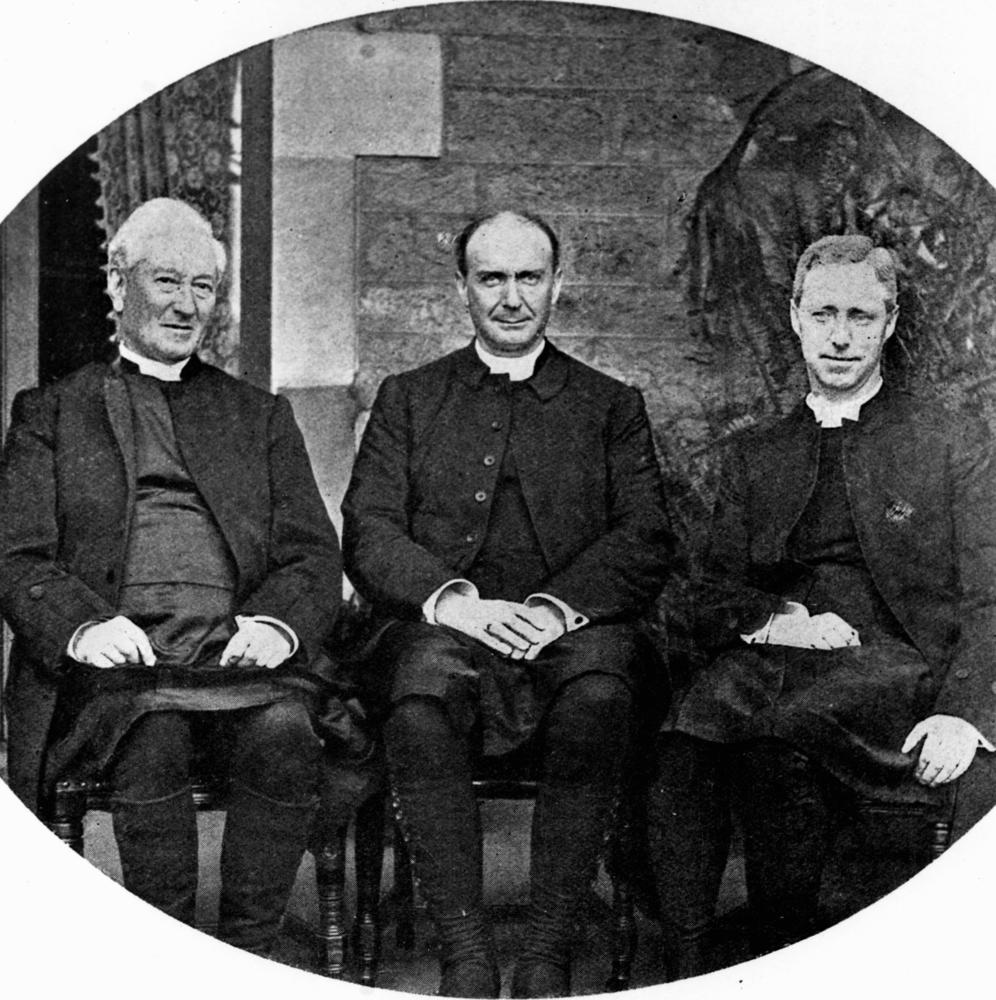
Consecration of George Halford as Bishop of Rockhampton (on right), 1909

George Dowglas Halford (1865 – 27 August 1948) was the second Anglican Bishop of Rockhampton from 1909 until 1920.

== Early life ==
Halford was educated at Felsted and Keble College, Oxford.

== Religious service ==
His first post was as a curate at St Peter's Jarrow, after which he was its vicar before emigrating to Australia to become the head of the St Andrew's Bush Brotherhood in 1897 and then Archdeacon of Mitchell, Queensland, where he remained until becoming the Bishop of Rockhampton in 1909.

=== Order of Witness ===
Halford resigned his bishopric in Rockhampton in 1920 to establish the Order of Witness, which was a radical experiment within the Anglican church extension movement of the interwar period. Seeking to reach the men in the railway construction camps and mining camps, and the struggling families in the new soldier and immigrant settlements, Bishop Halford established an order of priests who lived very simply and were prepared to be sent anywhere a parish priest could not normally minister, living in the mining and construction camps, and bearing personal witness to their faith. To support their work, the Order obtained in 1922–1923 a small farm adjoining Christ Church, Tingalpa. The farmhouse became their Priory, and the ancient and historic little Tingalpa Church became their chapel.

The priory, grounds and chapel of the Order of Witness were blessed by the Archbishop of Brisbane on 22 February 1923. The Church Chronicle of 1 March 1923:53 reported: The old church has been restored and enriched by additional ornaments and furniture. A painted figure of out Lord on the Cross hangs from the roof, and the altar is backed by dorsals and flanked by riddels of blue material. The cross and candlesticks are of silver. The whole effect is beautiful and devotional, and shows how even a little plain wooden church can be transformed into a thing of beauty and joy. Local parishioners were encouraged to attend the chapel services, and a call was made for funds to restore the building and cemetery.

Early in 1927 Bishop Halford left the Diocese of Brisbane, where he had been working in the Eidsvold and Burnett River districts, to carry out similar missionary work in the Diocese of Rockhampton. It appears that the Tingalpa priory closed soon after.

== Later life ==
Halford died after a long retirement on 27 August 1948.

== Legacy ==
George Halford is commemorated by a memorial at St Alban's Church, Wilston.

Anglican Communion titles
Preceded by Nathaniel Dawes	Bishop of Rockhampton; 1909 – 1920	Succeeded by Philip Charles Thurlow Crick
