= John Grindrod (bishop) =

Australian Anglican bishop

The Most Reverend Sir John Grindrod KBE
- Anglican Archbishop of Brisbane; Primate of Australia
- Church: Anglican
- See: Brisbane
- In office: 1982-1989
- Predecessor: Felix Arnott
- Successor: Peter Hollingworth
- Other posts: Bishop of Rockhampton (1971–1979); Bishop of Riverina (1966–1971)

Orders
- Ordination: 1952
- Consecration: 1967

Personal details
- Born: John Basil Rowland Grindrod; 14 December 1919 Aughton, Lancashire, England
- Died: 4 January 2009 (aged 89) Helensvale, Australia

Sir John Basil Rowland Grindrod KBE (14 December 1919 – 4 January 2009) was an English-born Australian Anglican bishop. He was the Primate of Australia from 1982 to 1989.

Grindrod was born in Aughton, Lancashire, England. He was educated at Repton School; Queen's College, Oxford (MA Oxon); and Lincoln Theological College. He was ordained a deacon in 1949 and a priest in 1952. He served as a curate at St Michael's Hulme, Manchester and then in Bundaberg, Queensland. He held incumbencies at All Souls' Ancoats, Manchester; and, moving to Australia, in Emerald, Queensland and North Rockhampton, Queensland while Archdeacon of Rockhampton.; and Christ Church, South Yarra.

Grindrod was the Bishop of Riverina from 1966 to 1971 and then Bishop of Rockhampton from 1971 to 1981. He was afterwards the Archbishop of Brisbane until 1989, additionally serving as Primate of the Anglican Church of Australia from 1982 to 1989. He took Australian citizenship in 1982 and was awarded a knighthood (KBE) in the 1983 New Year's Day Honours for services to religion.

Most of Grindrod's retirement years were spent in Murwillumbah in northern New South Wales then, from 2006, in Helensvale on the Gold Coast. He died, aged 89, on 4 January 2009, after a long illness.

Anglican Communion titles
Preceded by Hector Robinson	Bishop of Riverina; 1966 – 1971	Succeeded by Barry Hunter
Preceded by Donald Shearman	Bishop of Rockhampton; 1971 – 1979	Succeeded by George Hearn
Preceded by Felix Arnott	Archbishop of Brisbane; 1979 – 1989	Succeeded by Peter Hollingworth
Preceded by Marcus Loane	Primate of Australia; 1982 – 1989	Succeeded by Keith Rayner
