= St Paul's Cathedral, Rockhampton =

Anglican cathedral in Queensland, Australia

St Paul's Anglican Cathedral
- St Paul's Church of England Cathedral
- St Paul's Church of England
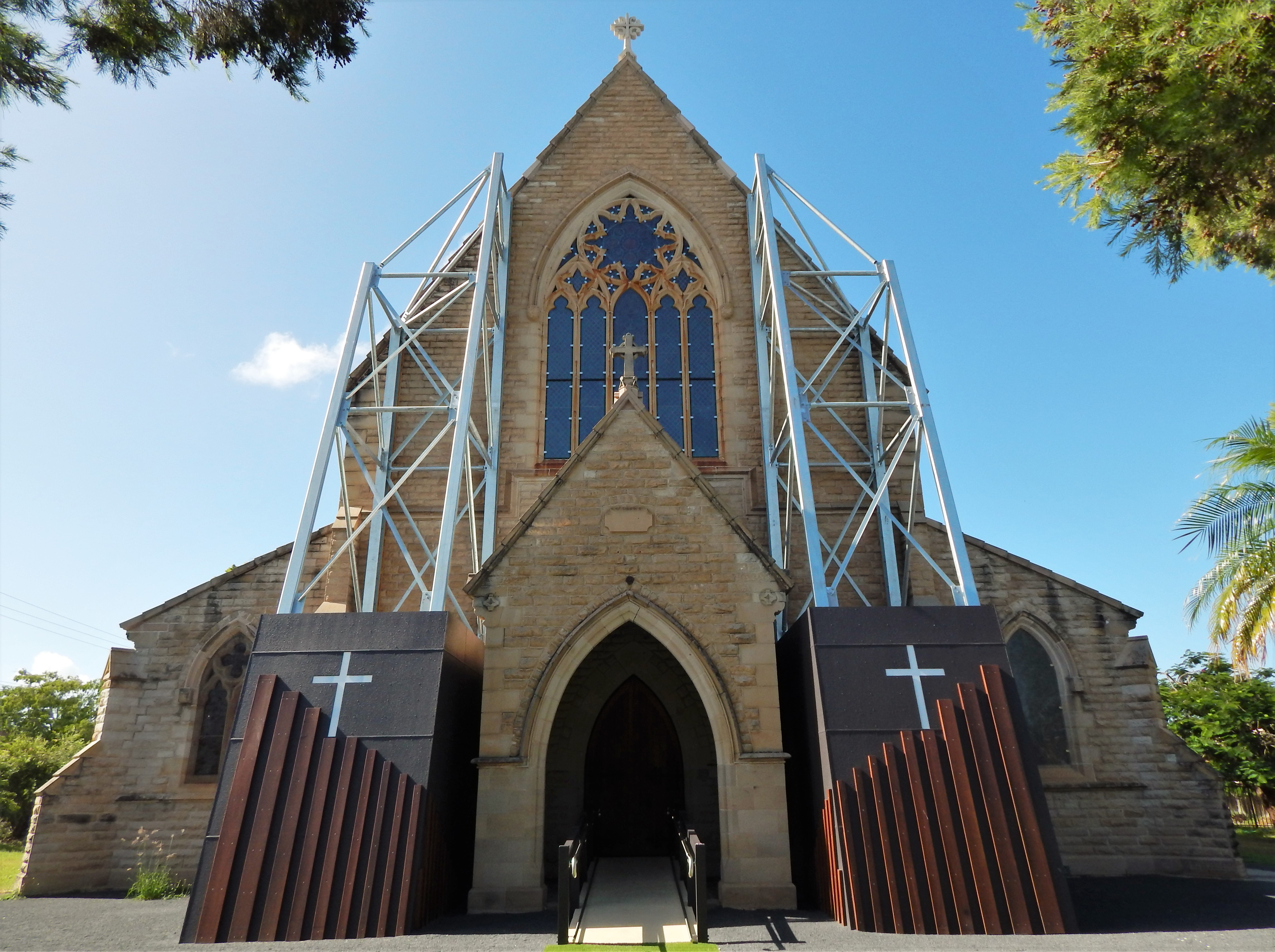
- St Paul's Anglican Cathedral, 2020
- St Paul's Anglican Cathedral
- 23°22′55″S 150°30′45″E
- Address: 89 William Street, Rockhampton, Rockhampton Region, Queensland
- Country: Australia
- Denomination: Anglican Church of Australia
- Website: www.rockhamptoncathedral.org.au

History
- Status: Church (1883 – 1892); Cathedral (since 1892)
- Dedication: Saint Paul
- Dedicated: 18 October 1883 by Bishop Matthew Hale
- Consecrated: 20 June 1911

Architecture
- Functional status: Active
- Architect: Annersley Voysey
- Architectural type: Church
- Style: Gothic Revival
- Years built: 1883 – 1953

Administration
- Diocese: Rockhampton

Clergy
- Bishop: Peter Grice
- Rector: Melusi Sibanda

Queensland Heritage Register
- Official name: St Paul's Anglican Cathedral, St Paul's Church of England, St Paul's Church of England Cathedral
- Type: State heritage (built)
- Designated: 21 October 1992
- Reference no.: 600821
- Significant period: 1880s–1890s (historical); 1880s–1910s, 1950s (fabric) ongoing (social)
- Significant components: Furniture/fittings, views to, cathedral, stained glass window/s, memorial – honour board/ roll of honour, chapel, gate – entrance

St Paul's Anglican Cathedral is an Australian heritage-listed cathedral at 89 William Street, Rockhampton, Rockhampton Region, Queensland. It was designed principally by Annersley Voysey and built from 1883 to 1953. It is also known as St Paul's Church of England and St Paul's Church of England Cathedral. It was added to the Queensland Heritage Register on 21 October 1992. The associated hall and offices were listed on the Queensland Heritage Register on 23 June 2000.

== History ==
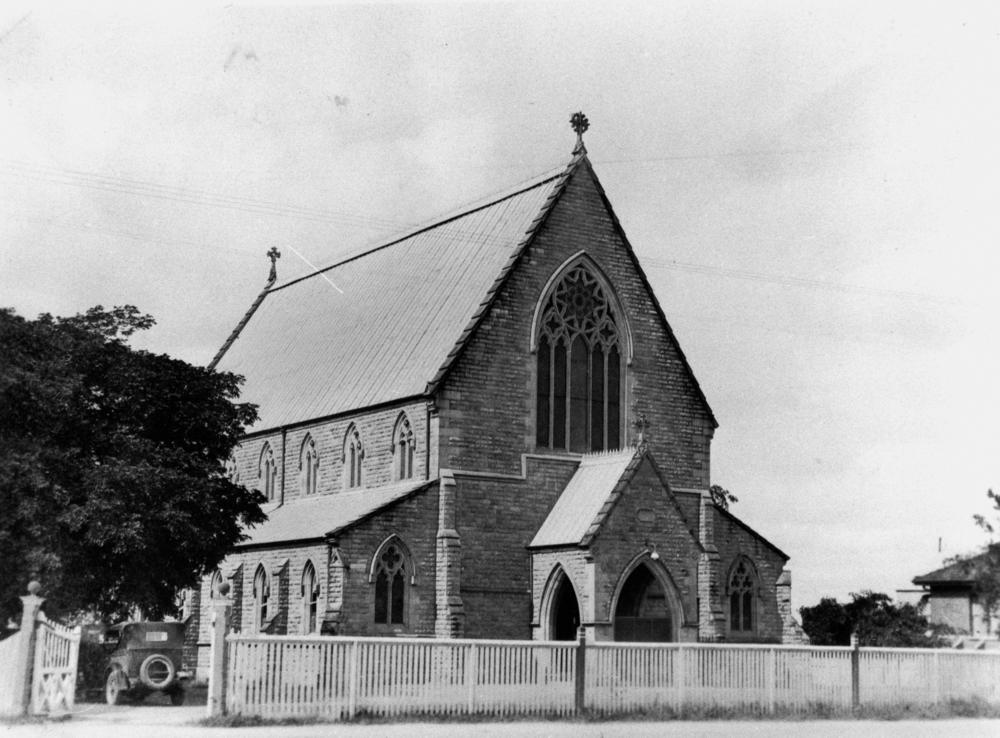
St Paul's Anglican Cathedral, 1930

St Paul's Anglican Cathedral was constructed as the Rockhampton Church of England and completed by 1883 when it was dedicated. The building was designed principally by Brisbane architect Annersley Voysey. The building became the Church of England cathedral in 1892.

Anglican services were held in Rockhampton from the late 1850s by lay ministers. In 1859 a small timber church and school building was constructed, however this was destroyed in a storm in 1860. The pioneer rector, the Reverend Thomas Jones, arrived in Rockhampton in about 1860 and held services at Grant's Timber Yard Hall and at the local Court House. By 1862 he had raised sufficient funds to build a timber church on the site later occupied by the parish hall. This building, designed by Thomas Dixon Chater, was built on a dedicated church reserve adjoining the National School. By 1872 about £3000 had been collected for the construction of a third Rockhampton church.

Plans and specifications were prepared for the new church, later the cathedral, in Brisbane by architect, Annersley Voysey. The stonemason employed on the first part of the project was Paul Sanderson who completed external walls to the height of one metre. By 1877 the walls were no higher and the money was spent, fresh tenders were called. Amid a flurry of concerns about the strength of the foundations as well the introduction of a new plan by Queensland Colonial Architect, FDG Stanley, the construction at the church was recommenced in September 1879 to revised plans by A. W. Voysey and Frank Scarr. The masonry was continued by George Sanderson, carpentry was completed by David Wiley, plumbing by J. Wakefield and painting by W. Aspinall. Funding shortages again caused a work stoppage, this time in April 1881 just as the roof was to be started. Committee members pledged to raise £200 each and the work was recommenced. The building was completed and furnished by 18 October 1883 when it was dedicated by Bishop Matthew Hale assisted by Bishop George Stanton. The building was not consecrated until 20 June 1911 when the building fund was repaid.

In 1892 the Rockhampton Church of England diocese was formed and the church was upgraded to a cathedral. The foundation bishop was the Right Reverend Nathaniel Dawes who was enthroned on 30 November 1892. Entrance gates, designed by Louis Spier Robertson, were constructed at the cathedral in 1899.

Other changes to the building include the removal in 1968 of the high altar from the eastern wall of the chancel to a more central position on the sanctuary. This work involved the removal of a rood screen, which was installed in the 1920s. The crucifix which was part of this screen is now affixed to a wall near the lectern. The Warriors' Chapel was added to the eastern end of one of the aisles in 1916. The Lady Chapel was created in the other aisle in about 1953. A temporary bell tower with a peal of eight bells was erected in 1946 as a thanksgiving offering for victory in World War II.

== Description ==
St Paul's Anglican Cathedral is a simple substantial masonry building with steeply pitched gabled roof. The building is constructed from rock faced evenly coursed sandstone and has smooth faced sandstone detailing including windows surrounds, base course, string coursing and buttress caps. The building has a rectangular plan, with apsidal chancel and rectangular gabled porched entrance. Flanking the chancel is a vestry to the south and a warriors' chapel to the north. The building is divided internally into nave and side aisles by a pointed arched arcade of smooth faced Stanwell sandstone.

The high altar is constructed with a Tasmanian black bean base and bronze and resin lining. The central figure on the altar is the Lamb from the Book of Revelation surrounded by four evangelists. The sedilia or stalls surrounding the altar are of timber. The bishop's cathedra or throne is made from red cedar and canopied in Gothic style. Four mosaics set into the floor in front of the throne are thought to date from the eighteenth century and depict mythical beasts from Ezekial and the Book of Revelation. The pulpit is carved from Stanwell sandstone and features a cross carved in relief. The font, also of Stanwell sandstone, is situated in the south western corner of the building. The sanctuary of the church houses a dean's stall, precentor's stall and canons' stalls. A brass lectern with eagle head is housed near the altar. The Lady Chapel houses a small coloured statue of the Madonna and Child known as Our Lady of Walsingham. The piece dates from 1963 and depicts the patron saint of the church. Also housed in the Lady Chapel is an icon of St Paul. The Warrior's Chapel houses a 1919 honour board bearing the names of the fallen from the diocese. A ceramic bas relief of the Madonna and Child (after Della Robbia) is attached to the wall of the southern side aisle. On the sills of some of the windows in the side aisles are small brass medallions which are modern interpretations of the fourteen Stations of the Cross.

The stained and coloured glass windows throughout the building are of high quality. The first window in the eastern end of the north aisle, of unknown origin, was placed in 1903 depicting Christ in Glory and dedicated to John Peddle. Windows in the southern aisle, with the exception of the one depicting St Paul on the Road to Damascus, were designed by William Bustard of Brisbane. The three central sanctuary lights (Messrs Lawndes and Dowry, London, after the design of Caroline Townshead) were placed in the memory of the first bishop, Nathaniel Dawes, in 1914, depicting the Agony and Crucifixion, the Risen Christ and the Day of Pentecost. The two windows flanking these were placed in 1921 and also made by Messrs Lawndes and Dowry in memory of Marion Dawson, depicting the Annunciation and Visitation and the eucharistic worship of the church.

== Heritage listing ==
St Paul's Anglican Cathedral was listed on the Queensland Heritage Register on 21 October 1992 having satisfied the following criteria.

The place is important in demonstrating the evolution or pattern of Queensland's history.

The cathedral demonstrates the growth of Rockhampton during the late nineteenth century. The substantial sandstone building constructed by 1883 became a cathedral in 1892 when the Diocese of Rockhampton was formed.

The place is important in demonstrating the principal characteristics of a particular class of cultural places.

The building is characteristic of substantial Gothic revival cathedrals, with sandstone construction, cruciform plan, Gothic detailing and steeply pitched roof.

The place is important because of its aesthetic significance.

The building has aesthetic merit as a well composed building and a Rockhampton landmark. Features of the building have individual significance as well crafted items, including internal furnishings and stained glass panels.

The place has a strong or special association with a particular community or cultural group for social, cultural or spiritual reasons.

The building has special associations for the Anglican Community of central and north Queensland as their cathedral.

The place has a special association with the life or work of a particular person, group or organisation of importance in Queensland's history.

The building is associated with the architect, Annersley Voysey and with many influential archbishops of the Rockhampton Diocese.

== Rectors and Deans of Rockhampton ==
The following individuals have served as rectors or deans of St Paul's Cathedral, Rockhampton:

Order	Name	Office	Date installed	Term ended	Term of office	Reason for term end	Notes
1	Thomas Jones	Dean	1861	1864	2–3 years		
2	W. Wright	Dean	1865	1867	1–2 years		
3	John T. Botting	Dean	1868	1870	1–2 years		
4	James Gilbertson	Dean	1870	1872	1–2 years		
5	M. Leigh	Dean	1872	1876	3–4 years		
6	W. Lock	Dean	1876	1879	2–3 years		
7	William Alfred Diggens	Dean	1879	1891	11–12 years		
8	A. Richards	Dean	1891	1898	6–7 years		
9	Thomas B. J. Parker	Dean	1898	1901	2–3 years		
10	P. Howes	Dean	1902	1902	0 years		
11	George Dowglas Halford	Dean	1902	1907	4–5 years	Bishop of Rockhampton, 1909–20	
12	George Herbert Rodgers	Dean	1907	1917	9–10 years		
13	Arthur Harold Barlee	Dean	1917	1919	1–2 years		
14	J. A. Coe	Dean	1919	1925	5–6 years		
15	Arthur T. Robinson OGS	Dean	1926	1930	3–4 years		
(11)	George Dowglas Halford	Dean	1930	1931	0–1 years	(locum tenens)	
16	Stewart Wemyss Gibson Frost	Dean	1931	1933	1–2 years		
17	Rowland Borrowman Davison	Dean	1934	1939	4–5 years		
18	Edward Herbert Strong	Dean	1940	1940	0 years		
19	John Edwin Dale	Dean	1940	1954	13–14 years		
20	Seering John Matthews	Rector	1954	1960	5–6 years	Bishop of Carpentaria, 1960–68	
21	John Hazlewood	Rector	1960	1968	7–8 years	Bishop of Ballarat, 1975–83	
22	John Bayton	Rector	1968	1979	10–11 years	Diocese of Melbourne, 1989–95	
23	Francis George Knight	Rector	1980	1983	2–3 years		
24	Brian George Farran	Rector	1983	1989	5–6 years	Bishop of Newcastle, 2005–12	
25	Christopher Gordon Whittall	Rector	1990	2009	18–19 years		
26		Rector	c. 2005	2010	4–5 years		
27	Lindsay David Howie	Rector	2010	2018	7–8 years		
28	Melusi Sibanda	Rector	2019	incumbent	6–7 years		
