= Nathaniel Dawes =

Australian Anglican bishop

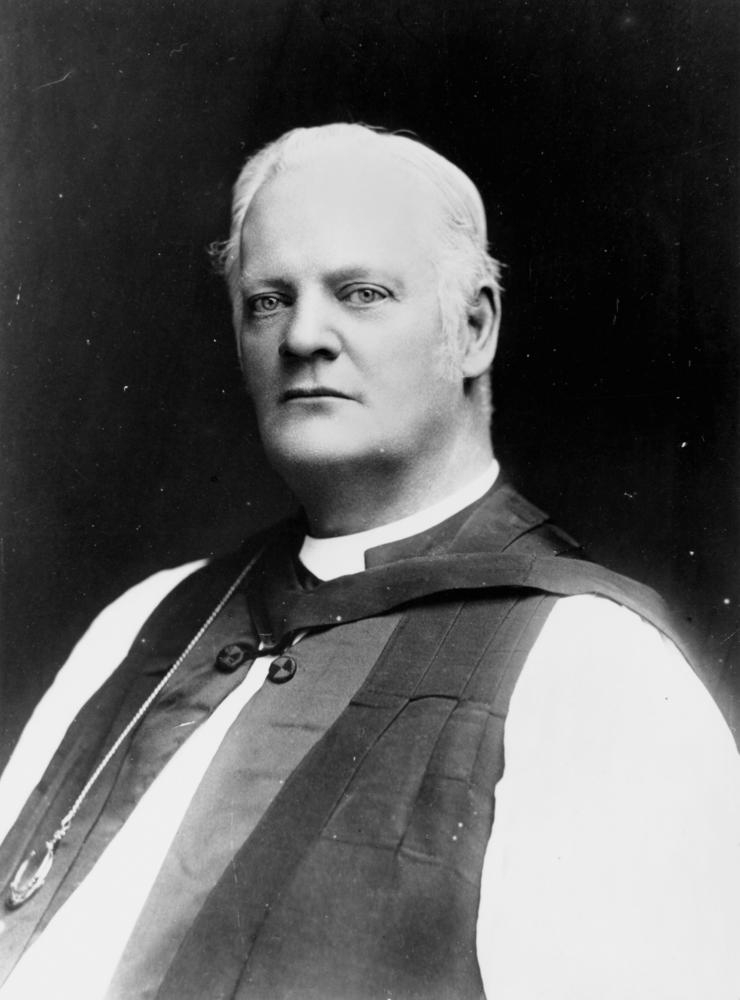

Nathaniel Dawes (24 July 1843 – 12 September 1910) was an Anglican bishop in Australia. He was the first Bishop of Rockhampton in Queensland, from 1892 to 1909. He was the first bishop to be consecrated in Australia.

== Early life ==
Dawes was born in Rye, Sussex, England, and educated at Montpelier College, Brighton, and St Alban Hall, Oxford. He was an engineer who was involved in the construction of Blackfriars Bridge.

== Ordained ministry ==
Dawes was ordained a deacon in 1871 and priest in 1872. His first post was as a curate at St Peter's Church, Vauxhall, from 1871 to 1877 after which he was vicar of Charterhouse, Somerset, before emigrating to Australia to become the rector of St Andrew's South Brisbane. He was then appointed Archdeacon of Brisbane and later its first coadjutor bishop before translation to Rockhampton in 1892. He was consecrated a bishop on 1 May 1889 at St Andrew's Cathedral, Sydney, by Alfred Barry, Bishop of Sydney. In 1897 he was involved in the establishment of the Bush Brotherhood, an order of itinerant outback priests. Dawes travelled to England in 1907 for medical treatment. On 27 May 1908, on medical advice, he reluctantly resigned his see and was succeeded by George Halford.

== Death ==
Dawes died on 12 September 1910 in Malvern, Worcestershire, England.

Anglican Communion titles
Preceded by Inaugural appointment	Bishop of Rockhampton; 1892 – 1909	Succeeded by George Halford
