= Anglican Diocese of Rockhampton =

Diocese of the Anglican Church of Australia

Diocese of Rockhampton
- Coat of arms

Location
- Country: Australia
- Territory: Central Queensland; Mackay, Isaac & Whitsunday; (Southern part); Wide Bay–Burnett; (Northern part)
- Ecclesiastical province: Queensland
- Metropolitan: Archbishop of Brisbane
- Headquarters: 89 William Street; Rockhampton Q 4700

Information
- Denomination: Anglican
- Rite: Book of Common Prayer; An Australian Prayer Book; A Prayer Book for Australia
- Established: 1892
- Cathedral: St Paul's Cathedral, Rockhampton
- Language: English

Current leadership
- Parent church: Anglican Church of Australia
- Bishop: Peter Grice
- Dean: Melusi Sibanda; (since 2019)

Website
- anglicanchurchcq.org.au
- Logo of the Diocese

The Diocese of Rockhampton (also known as Anglican Church Central Queensland) is a diocese of the Anglican Church of Australia, founded in 1892. It is situated in the central part of the state of Queensland, Australia. It is part of the Province of Queensland. The cathedral church of the diocese is St Paul's Cathedral in Rockhampton.

On 18 July 2020, Peter Grice, the Dean of Geraldton since 2015 and vicar-general of the Anglican Diocese of North West Australia, was elected as the 13th Bishop of Rockhampton. He was installed in the position on 27 February 2021.

== Structure ==
Rockhampton is one of 23 dioceses of the Anglican Church of Australia. The diocese covers an area of approximately 57 million hectares, roughly twice the size of New Zealand. The diocese contains nearly the whole central regions of Queensland. The population of the diocese is 216,000 of whom approximately 48,000 indicate that they are Anglicans. The diocese has 20 parishes and ministry districts, with the largest parish bigger than the State of Victoria. The cathedral church of the diocese is St Paul's Cathedral in Rockhampton.

On 18 July 2020, Peter Grice, the Dean of Geraldton since 2015 and vicar-general of the Anglican Diocese of North West Australia, was elected as the 13th Bishop of Rockhampton. He was installed in the position on 27 February 2021.

== History ==
The diocese was erected in 1892 from the Diocese of Brisbane; its first bishop was Bishop Nathaniel Dawes. The diocese celebrated its centenary in 1992.

== Region ==
The diocese reaches across central Queensland, between the Diocese of Brisbane to the south and the Diocese of North Queensland to the north. It stretches from the east coast of Australia to the Northern Territory border, with its northern border being a straight line just north of the town of Moranbah and its southern region including the localities of Boyne Island, Biloela, Moura, Tambo and Blackall. Named after its main city of Rockhampton the diocese also includes the cities and towns of Gladstone, Yeppoon, Gracemere, Mt Morgan, Middlemount, Dysart, Blackwater, Springsure, Emerald, Clermont, Barcaldine, Longreach, Winton, Bedourie and Boulia.

== Bishops of Rockhampton ==
Bishops of Rockhampton
No	From	Until	Incumbent	Notes
1	1892	1908	Nathaniel Dawes	Previously Archdeacon of Anglican Diocese of Brisbane and later its first coadjutor bishop.
2	1909	1920	George Halford	Previously Archdeacon of Mitchell, Queensland; resigned to establish the Order of Witness.
3	1921	1927	Philip Crick	Translated to Ballarat.
4	1928	1946	Fortescue Ash	
5	1947	1958	James Housden	Translated to Newcastle.
6	1959	1963	Theodore McCall	Translated to Wangaratta.
7	1963	1971	Donald Shearman	Later Bishop of Grafton; subsequently resigned his holy orders and was defrocked.
8	1971	1980	Sir John Grindrod KBE	Translated from Riverina; translated to Brisbane; later also Primate of Australia.
9	1981	1996	George Hearn	
10	1996	2003	Ron Stone AM	Previously an assistant bishop in Tasmania.
11	2003	2013	Godfrey Fryar	Previously Assistant Bishop in the Diocese of Canberra and Goulburn.
12	2014	2020	David Robinson	
13	2021	present	Peter Grice	Previously Dean of Geraldton; installed 27 February 2021.

== Ministries ==
Chaplaincies: hospital, correctional centre, police, Mission to Seafarers

Aboriginal and Islander Anglican Ministry: Woorabinda, Murri Wodja

Anglican Regional Ministry
