= Holy Trinity Parish Hall, Fortitude Valley =

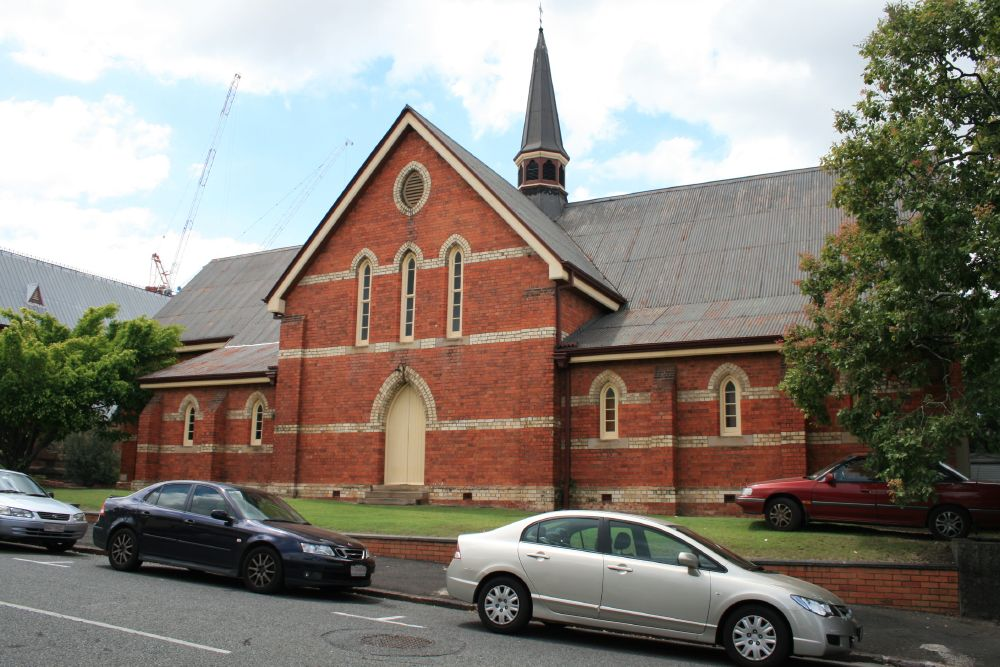
- Holy Trinity Parish Hall, 2009

- Location within Queensland Location within Australia
- 27.4541°S 153.038°E
- Location: 141 Brookes Street, Fortitude Valley, City of Brisbane, Queensland, Australia

History
- Design period: 1870s–1890s (late 19th century)
- Built: 1891–1892

Site notes
- Architect: John Hingeston Buckeridge
- Architectural style: Gothic

Queensland Heritage Register
- Official name: Holy Trinity Parish Hall
- Type: state heritage (built)
- Designated: 21 October 1992
- Reference no.: 600203
- Significant period: 1891–1892 (fabric)
- Significant components: plaque, classroom/classroom block/teaching area, wall/s – retaining, hall
- Builders: John Quinn

Holy Trinity Parish Hall is a heritage-listed Anglican church hall at 141 Brookes Street, Fortitude Valley, City of Brisbane, Queensland, Australia. It was designed by John Hingeston Buckeridge and built from 1891 to 1892 by John Quinn. It was added to the Queensland Heritage Register on 21 October 1992.

== History ==
Holy Trinity Parish Hall at Church Street, Fortitude Valley is a substantial brick building constructed in 1891–92 to the design of Brisbane architect JH Buckeridge. It replaced an earlier stone school room on the site.

The Church of England was the first institutional religion established in Queensland, with the parish of St John's in Brisbane created in 1849 as part of the Diocese of Newcastle. Land bounded by George, William and Elizabeth streets was granted to the church and St John's Church was consecrated on this site in 1854. This parish encompassed a wide district which extended well beyond the Brisbane town boundary and included Milton, Enoggera and Sandgate.

By the mid-1850s a village of 100 to 150 houses had been established at Fortitude Valley just north of the Brisbane town boundary and there were more homes scattered through the semi-bush to the north and east. For Forrtitude Valley residents, access to St John's Church at the southern end of North Brisbane was difficult. Principal access was via the steep, unformed track of Ann Street over Duncan's Hill, which was not cut down until the 1860s and 1870s. Wickham Street did not exist at this period; in its place was a series of ponds and brickyards.

In recognition of the increasing settlement of the district north of Brisbane, part of St John's parish separated in 1856 to form Holy Trinity parish. The new parish encompassed the areas of Fortitude Valley, Bowen Hills and New Farm and extended west to Enoggera and north to Sandgate. At first a cottage was rented at the corner of Ann and Ballow Streets for use as a Church of England school on weekdays and as a place of worship on Sundays. In 1857 the New South Wales Government (the separation of Queensland did not occur until 1859) granted to the parish two acres of land bounded by Ann, Brookes, Church and Wickham streets for church purposes (the present site of the Holy Trinity Church, the rectory and this Parish Hall). In the same year a long, stone building was erected on this site for use as a school room and temporary church.

The Anglican Diocese of Brisbane was formed in 1859, with Bishop Edward Tufnell taking office as the first Bishop of Brisbane in 1860. At this time St John's Church was designated as the pro-Cathedral, and Holy Trinity parish was incorporated into the Diocese of Brisbane.

During the 1860s and 1870s Fortitude Valley developed as a commercial and residential centre and population density in Fortitude Valley and surrounding areas increased substantially. The 1857 stone building was enlarged in 1862 to accommodate an expanding congregation and by the mid-1870s Holy Trinity parish was committed to the construction of a new, larger church on the Brookes Street site. Designed in 1875 by the then Queensland Colonial Architect, Francis Drummond Greville Stanley, the second Holy Trinity church was erected in 1876–1877 by contractor James Robinson. The 1857 stone church/school building remained in use as a schoolroom. In 1889 a new rectory was constructed fronting Brookes Street, replacing an earlier rectory in Leichhardt Street.

In 1891 the parish's Leichhardt Street property was sold for £3,500 and the stone schoolroom was demolished to make way for the present brick parish hall in Church Street. The sale of the Leichhardt Street land likely financed construction of the new hall.

Holy Trinity Parish Hall was designed as a Sunday school-cum-hall by architect John Hingeston Buckeridge. As Brisbane Diocesan architect from 1887 to 1902, Buckeridge was responsible for many Church of England ecclesiastical buildings in southeast Queensland, including: the St John the Baptist Anglican Church, Bulimba (1888); St Matthew's Church, Kilkivan (1888); St Mary's Anglican Church, Mount Morgan (1888–1889); the rectory at St Andrews Anglican Church, South Brisbane (1889); the rectory and additions to the church hall at St Mary's Anglican Church, Kangaroo Point (1889); St Agnes Anglican Church, Esk (1889); St George's Church, Redland Bay (1889–1890); the church-school of St Michaels and All Angels at New Farm (1890–1891); the rectory at Holy Trinity Anglican Church, Woolloongabba (1890–1891); Anglican churches at Killarney, St George, Woodford and Yuleba in 1891; Christ Church, Milton (1891); Christ Church, Bundaberg (1892–1899); St Luke's Anglican Church, Toowoomba (1894); St Augustine's, Hamilton (1895–1896); the Anglican Church Institute and Synod Hall in Brisbane (1895–1897); St Colomb's at Sandgate (1899); St John the Evangelist Church at Mundoolun (1899); St Paul's, Roma; and the Christ Church, Childers (1899). Buckeridge also designed the All Souls' Quetta Memorial Church (later Cathedral) on Thursday Island (1892–1893).

The foundation stone of the new parish school was laid by the Bishop of Brisbane, Dr William Webber, on 17 October 1891. The building was completed in approximated 3 months by contractor John Quinn at a cost of £1,775, which included stabling at the rear of the building. It was opened formally as the Holy Trinity Sunday School by the Governor of Queensland, Sir Henry Wylie Norman, on 23 January 1892.

At completion the building was described in the local press as "a very creditable addition to the architecture of the Valley." It contained a main hall measuring 92 by 24 feet (28.0 by 7.3 m), two transepts each 24 by 14 feet (7.3 by 4.3 m) and four classrooms, each 17 by 12 feet (5.2 by 3.7 m). The classrooms were separated from the main hall and transepts by arches and folding timber doors, which could be opened to allow the whole to be used as one hall. At one end of the main hall was a platform or stage, with a library at one side and a retiring room on the other, each 12 by 8 feet (3.7 by 2.4 m); at the other end of the main hall was a raised infants' gallery, which could accommodate 100 children. In total, the building could accommodate over 500 children or 400 adults comfortably. The interior was finished originally in face brick.

The majority of Brisbane Diocesan buildings of this period were constructed of timber, which was less expensive than stone or brick. Construction of a parish hall-cum-school room in brick was uncommon and the substantial nature of the Holy Trinity Parish Hall reflects the strength of Holy Trinity parish in the late 19th century.

== Description ==
Holy Trinity Parish Hall (1891–1892) is situated adjacent to Holy Trinity Church (1876–1877, 1920–21, 1929) and Holy Trinity Rectory (1889) in Fortitude Valley. All three buildings are located on a site bounded by Brookes, Church and Wickham streets at the northern end of Fortitude Valley. They complement each other in terms of scale, materials (each is of brick construction), use of Gothic stylistic elements and garden setting. The parish hall, fronting Church Street, is positioned to the south east of the church and to the south west of the rectory, which faces Brookes Street.

Holy Trinity Parish Hall is a substantial, single-storeyed brick building with a multi-gabled roof. It is a plain but well-resolved design, incorporating motifs common to Gothic-styled ecclesiastical building in the cruciform plan, spire (roof ventilator), lancet windows and joinery detailing.

The building rests on a base of pale cream bricks and the red brick exterior walls are decorated with bands of the same cream brick, which accent the wall face and the window sills and heads. Windows are simple lancets and door openings have flat stone lintels with corbelled shoulders or pointed arches of cream brick. The roof is of corrugated iron over exposed timber framing, with a timber-boarded ceiling. There is a timber-framed spire with louvred ventilator openings at the crossing of the transepts with the main roof.

At the western corner of the building is a marble foundation stone or plaque with the inscription: This foundation stone was laid by the Bishop of Brisbane October 17th 1891. JH Buckeridge, architect. John Quinn, contractor.

Above the main entrance door is another plaque with the inscription: Trinity Sunday School opened by His Excellency Sir Henry Wylie Norman KGB, GCMG January 23rd 1892. J Spooner, rector. A Trimble, superintendent.

The interior comprises one large, high, open central space (the main hall) divided from four small former class rooms along each long side by lancet-arched openings with folding timber doors. The interior walls are plastered and the floor is of narrow timber boards.

A small front grassed yard to Church Street has some plantings and a low brick retaining wall along the road alignment.

== Heritage listing ==
Holy Trinity Parish Hall was listed on the Queensland Heritage Register on 21 October 1992 having satisfied the following criteria.

The place is important in demonstrating the evolution or pattern of Queensland's history.

Holy Trinity Parish Hall, Fortitude Valley is part of an ecclesiastical group comprising Holy Trinity Church (1876–1877, 1920–21 & 1929), Holy Trinity Rectory (1889) and Holy Trinity Parish Hall (1891–1892). The site has historical significance for its association with the establishment of the Anglican Church in Queensland and the surviving buildings are important evidence of the late 19th century consolidation of the Church of England in Queensland, which is an important theme in the state's history. The place also illustrates the expansion of suburban Brisbane in the late 19th century.

The place demonstrates rare, uncommon or endangered aspects of Queensland's cultural heritage.

Holy Trinity Parish Hall demonstrates an uncommon aspect of Queensland's cultural heritage, being one of comparatively few 19th century Church of England parish halls of brick construction in Queensland.

The place is important in demonstrating the principal characteristics of a particular class of cultural places.

Holy Trinity Parish Hall is important in demonstrating the principal characteristics of its class. It is a substantial school room-cum-hall utilising Gothic stylistic elements popular in ecclesiastical buildings of the period, including the cruciform plan, ridge ventilator in the form of a small spire, lancet windows and joinery detailing. Holy Trinity parish was at its peak in the late 19th century and the parish hall, in its substantial scale and brick construction, reflects the comparative wealth of the parishioners, while restraint in the interior finishes and modest decorative detailing reflects the building's ecclesiastical function. The building is a good example of the ecclesiastical work of Brisbane Diocesan architect JH Buckeridge and has aesthetic significance generated by its design, materials and garden setting. Holy Trinity Parish Hall makes a significant contribution to the Holy Trinity Precinct in Fortitude Valley. This group is important in demonstrating the principal characteristics of its class: a substantially intact, cohesive, late 19th century Queensland ecclesiastical precinct. The cohesion is due to the consistency in scale, forms, materials, use of Gothic design elements, quality of architectural design and location within a garden setting (including mature trees and retaining walls). The arrangement and inter-relationship of the buildings on the site is important in illustrating how the precinct functions.

The place is important because of its aesthetic significance.

The building is a good example of the ecclesiastical work of Brisbane Diocesan architect JH Buckeridge and has aesthetic significance generated by its design, materials and garden setting. Since the late 19th century Holy Trinity Precinct has made a significant aesthetic contribution to the Brisbane townscape.

The place has a strong or special association with a particular community or cultural group for social, cultural or spiritual reasons.

Holy Trinity Parish Hall is of social significance, being associated with the work of the Holy Trinity parish since 1892.

== See also ==
- Holy Trinity Church, Fortitude Valley
- Holy Trinity Rectory, Fortitude Valley
