= Holy Trinity Church, Fortitude Valley =

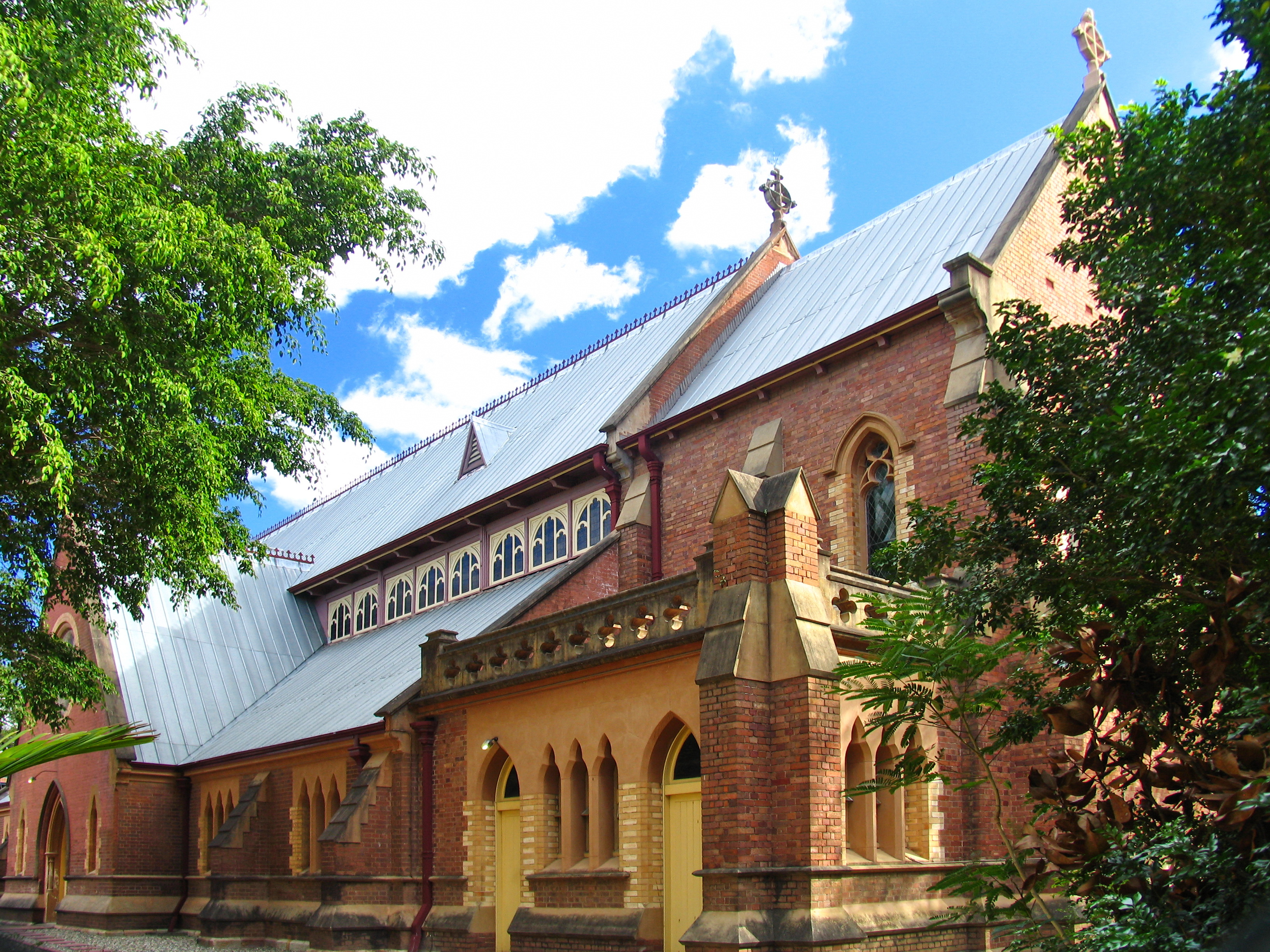
- Holy Trinity Church, Fortitude Valley, 2007

- Location within Queensland Location within Australia
- 27.4542°S 153.0382°E
- Location: 141 Brookes Street, Fortitude Valley, City of Brisbane, Queensland, Australia

History
- Design period: 1870s–1890s (late 19th century)
- Built: 1876–1877, 1920–1921, 1925, 1929

Site notes
- Architect: Francis Drummond Greville Stanley
- Architectural style: Gothic Revival

Queensland Heritage Register
- Official name: Holy Trinity Church
- Type: state heritage (built)
- Designated: 21 October 1992
- Reference no.: 600202
- Significant period: 1876–1877, 1920–1921, 1925, 1929, 1956 (fabric)
- Significant components: furniture/fittings, memorial – wall, stained glass window/s, gallery, pipe organ
- Builders: James Robinson

Holy Trinity Church is a heritage-listed Anglican church at 141 Brookes Street, Fortitude Valley, City of Brisbane, Queensland, Australia. It is the second church on that site. It was designed by Francis Drummond Greville Stanley built from 1876 to 1877 by James Robinson. It was modified in 1920–1921, 1925 and 1929. It was added to the Queensland Heritage Register on 21 October 1992.

== History ==
Construction on The Holy Trinity Church in Fortitude Valley began in 1876 and was completed in 1877 by the Anglican Church. It was the second Anglican church on this site and the third in Fortitude Valley.

Fortitude Valley was established in 1849 and the first rector, The Rev. E.K. Yeatman, of "our mother church in this portion of Australia" was appointed in 1856. The Holy Trinity Parish included Sandgate, New Farm, Enoggera and Bowen Hills, and as St Johns was situated on the site of what is now Queens Gardens, parishioners had difficulty attending services as the Ann Street cutting had not been started. There was no Wickham Street, only a row of ponds and brickyards on the site. By 1856, it was apparent that St Johns was not large enough for the growing parish, and a new church was established in a rented cottage at the corner of Ann and Ballow Streets, across from the Fortitude Valley Post Office. Divine services were held on Sunday, and a day school was conducted during the week.

In 1857 the parish was granted two acres of land for church purposes by the New South Wales government (the separation of Queensland did not occur until December 1859) This is the same site that the current church is now located on. The first building was constructed as a temporary church at a cost of £495, and was described as "a long, plain building of rough stone and cut facings". It was later enlarged at a further cost of £300.

The first rectory was built for The Reverend John Mosely who was appointed in 1861. It cost £650 and was situated in Leichhardt Street on land which extended to Water Street. This land was a Crown grant to the Church of England.

When the Rev. James Love was appointed in 1875, it was decided that a new church was required. "From the acorn – as represented by the first cottage room – the oak of the present Trinity Church was bursting". Church wardens John Bramston, Henry Whyborn and the Attorney General of Queensland began a fund raising appeal. The architect for the church was Francis Drummond Greville Stanley. Although he was employed as the Queensland Colonial Architect at the time, the Holy Trinity church was one of his many private projects.

His initial drawings were for a stone building, but the tenders must have been too high as new plans were produced for a stone or brick building of smaller scale with options for the building to be built with or without a chancel and for the copings, window dressings and string courses to be of stone or cement.

He also designed a number of other churches of both brick and stone that were of a similar style and scale to the Holy Trinity. These included St Pauls Anglican Church, Maryborough and the Holy Trinity Church, Mackay.

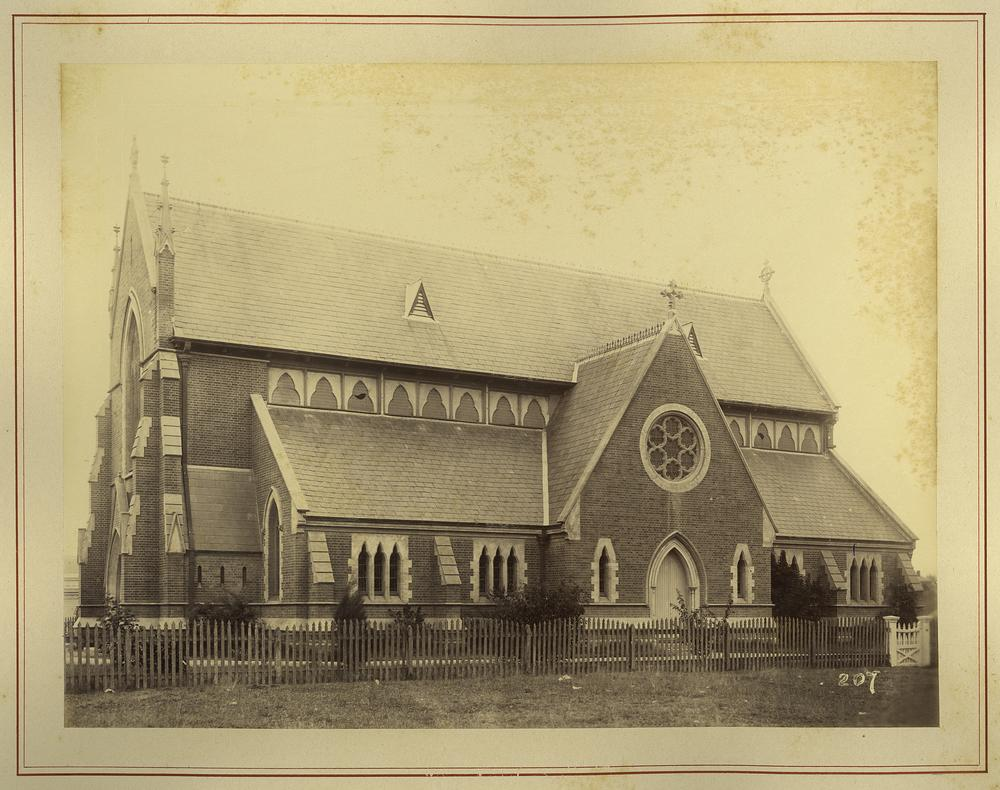
Holy Trinity Church, 1886

The corner stone of the Holy Trinity, Fortitude Valley was laid on Saturday 29 April 1876 and the building was formally opened by Bishop Matthew Hale on Saturday 21 July 1877. It was constructed without a chancel and with cement dressings by James Robinson, bricklayer and builder, at a cost of approximately £3000.

It was now apparent that the old rectory was too far away from the church and in 1891 it was sold. A new rectory, also designed by F.D.G. Stanley and constructed by James Robinson, was erected next to the church. In January 1892, the old church which was being used as a school was demolished and replaced with a new building to be used as a hall. This building was designed by diocesan architect John Hingeston Buckeridge.

In 1919 the Rev. Samuel Watkin went to Maryborough to inspect the chancel of St Pauls Church of England which had also been designed by F.D.G. Stanley. Upon his return he was instructed to begin interviewing architects to ascertain the cost of a new chancel.

Church records mention Mr Addison, architect in connection with the chancel. This could be George Henry Male Addison or his son George Frederick Addison. Tenders were received by the church in April 1920 and ranged from £1,775 to £2,268. The new chancel and sanctuary were dedicated on Sunday, 4 September 1921 by Archbishop St Clair Donaldson.

Mr Addison was once again consulted when the rector received a cheque from a donor for the remodelling of the clerestory windows in 1925. He presented several designs, one of which was selected. It was estimated that it would cost between £500 and £600, and the donor instructed that specifications should proceed, saying "it was possible that the design might be carried out. If so it would remove an ugly blot and substitute a thing of beauty". The new clerestory windows were dedicated on 14 June 1925 by Archbishop Gerald Sharp.

On Sunday, 10 November 1929 the last major addition to the church, the new reredos was dedicated. It was designed by Lange Leopold Powell of Atkinson, Powell and Conrad, and was carved by Andrew Lang Petrie.

Apart from a brick retaining wall that was erected in 1956 as a memorial to those who died in World War II, the grounds and buildings have remained relatively intact from this date.

== Description ==
Holy Trinity Church is a substantial brick and stone building located on a site bound by Church, Wickham and Brookes Streets, Fortitude Valley. The church precinct includes the Holy Trinity Parish Hall, and the Holy Trinity Rectory, both of which are also heritage-listed.

The church has a central clerestoried nave which is flanked by aisles and intercepted by transepts midway. It sits on a stone base and is mainly constructed of dark brick laid in the English bond method, with the window surrounds, string courses and copings finished in cement render. The roof is of rolled metal which replaced the original Welsh slate roof of Duchess size tiles, and has cast iron cresting running along the ridge of the body and transepts of the church. A stone cross sits on the point of each gable end.

A pair of Gothic arched doors are centrally located in the symmetrically arranged south face of the building. They are set into a portal entrance of cement render and brick which features a hood moulding. An early pointed arched stained glass and tracery window is centred above the portal entrance, above which is a small rectangular window. The remainder of the south face consists of two smaller lancet windows on either side of the doors, and a gable end which is flanked by towers topped with pinnacles on either side. All of the brickwork to this face, apart from the portal entrance is bagged and painted.

The east and west faces of the church are similar, both having centrally located transepts flanked by four equal bays of windows, two on either side of the transept gables. These bays of windows are made up of three lancet windows of stained glass and surrounded by lighter brickwork and cement render. The bays are divided by buttresses of dark brick which have cement rendered copings. The transept gables have double doors located centrally between two small windows and have been bagged and painted to match the front face of the church. Above the doorway is a circular window with stone tracery and stained glass panels. This is also surrounded by lighter brickwork. The colours of the stained glass in these windows differs on each side of the building. There are eight clerestory windows on either side of the transept gables. These are replacements of the originals and are round arched with each window divided into three smaller arches. Centrally located in the roof line above these windows are two ventilation gablets, one on either side of the transept gables.

The north face or rear of the building is an addition to the original building, and was built in 1921. This addition had been included in the original design for the church and it was always intended that it be built as the parish grew. It is constructed in the same style and of the same materials as the remainder of the building and houses the chancel and vestry. The rear face is dominated by a large grouped lancet stained glass window which sits above the reredos internally. On the eastern side of the chancel is a small rectangular room which houses the vestry, and on the western side is a small polygonal room. The walls to these rooms are lower than the rest of the building and are capped with a concrete parapet punctuated with a quatrefoil design. These rooms are accessed externally by timber double doors which have a leadlight window above them. Both the doors and the window are set into a Gothic arch similar in style to those in the original part of the building.

Internally the walls are rendered masonry and scored to represent stone in places. The floor is concrete with two bands of encaustic tiles running the length of the nave and a feature pattern of encaustic and tessellated tiles at the entry. To the right of the entry doors is a semi-circular staircase leading to the gallery which houses seating and an early organ. The seats to the gallery are of cedar and pine and appear to have a ventilation system located in the floor underneath them.

The nave arcade is made up of six cast iron pillars on either side. These are of complex section cast to resemble clustered pillars used in Early English churches and sit on octagonal rendered masonry bases. They are linked by a cast iron framework decorated with a punched quatrefoil motif, forming pointed arched openings. The spandrels are fitted with timber panels featuring alternating cutout patterns.

The roof construction of the body of the church has hammer beam roof trusses and is lined with timber boards which are laid diagonally. All timber work, including the pews is either natural teak or timber stained to a teak colour. Many pieces of liturgical furniture are retained in the church.

A high, pointed arch divides the nave from the chancel. This is dominated by the altar and the reredos which is carved of Yangan freestone. The sanctuary is defined by the altar rails which are timber carved and stained to match the rest of the timber work.

Situated in front of the chancel are the lectern and pulpit. The pulpit is also of carved freestone with detailing in pink marble. The lectern is brass and is in the shape of an eagle with outstretched wings.

== Heritage listing ==
Holy Trinity Church was listed on the Queensland Heritage Register on 21 October 1992 having satisfied the following criteria.

The place is important in demonstrating the evolution or pattern of Queensland's history.

The Holy Trinity Church demonstrates the rapid growth of the Anglican community not only in Fortitude Valley but also in communities further to the North and East of Fortitude Valley.

The place is important in demonstrating the principal characteristics of a particular class of cultural places.

The building demonstrates the principal characteristics of a mid - Victorian interpretation of Early English Gothic architecture, and also an example of the ecclesiastical work of prominent Brisbane architect F.D.G. Stanley. It has a number of intact elements typical to this style, including the plan form and detailing which includes the gallery and organ, joinery and stained glass windows.

The place is important because of its aesthetic significance.

As a substantial church in a prominent location, Holy Trinity Church is of considerable aesthetic value.

The place is important in demonstrating a high degree of creative or technical achievement at a particular period.

The design uses particularly innovative building techniques for the period in which it was built. These include the cement flooring and the use of cast iron columns in the nave arcade.

The place has a strong or special association with a particular community or cultural group for social, cultural or spiritual reasons.

It was only seven years after the first settlers arrived in The Valley that the need arose for a new church. From that time, the church has had a strong association with the Anglican community. The church contains many items of furniture of special value to the parish community.

== See also ==
- Holy Trinity Parish Hall, Fortitude Valley
- Holy Trinity Rectory, Fortitude Valley
