= Lady Bowen Hospital =

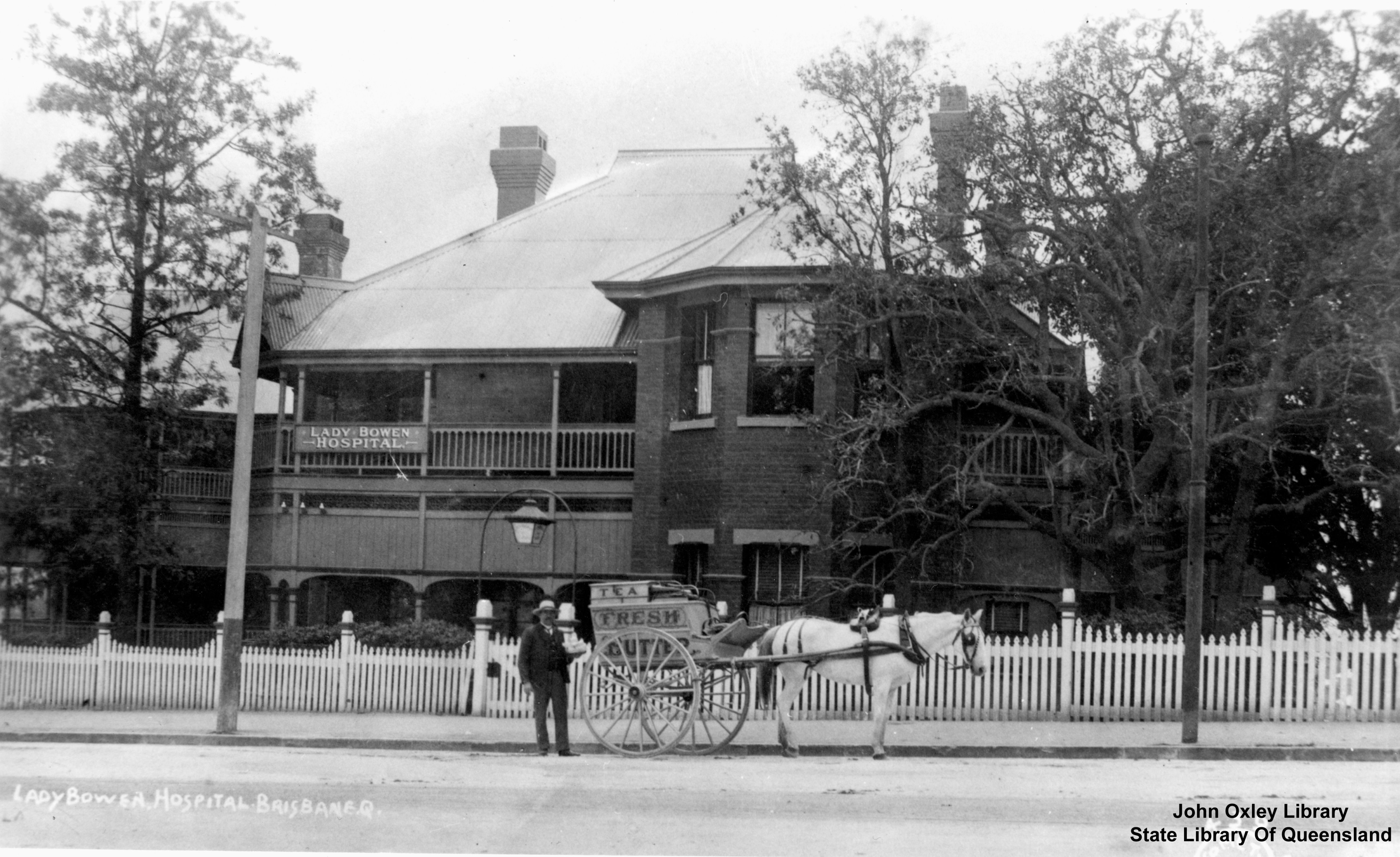
- Former Lady Bowen Hospital, c. 1912

- Location within Queensland
- 27.4611°S 153.0198°E
- Location: 497–535 Wickham Terrace, Spring Hill, City of Brisbane, Queensland, Australia

History
- Design period: 1870s–1890s (late 19th century)
- Built: 1889–1890

Queensland Heritage Register
- Official name: Lady Bowen Hospital Complex (former), Anzac House and Club, Lady Bowen Hostel, Queensland Lying-In Hospital
- Type: state heritage (built)
- Designated: 23 April 1999
- Reference no.: 601798
- Significant period: 1880s, 1920s, 1940s (fabric); 1880s–1940s (historic)
- Significant components: clubroom/s / clubhouse, hospital, ward – enclosed, residential accommodation – nurses' quarters
- Builders: John Quinn

Lady Bowen Hospital is a heritage-listed former maternity hospital and now social housing and office complex at 497–535 Wickham Terrace, Spring Hill, City of Brisbane, Queensland, Australia. It was designed by John H. Buckeridge and built from 1889 to 1890 by John Quinn. It was also known as Brisbane Lying-In Hospital and the Lady Bowen Hostel. It was added to the Queensland Heritage Register on 23 April 1999. The complex consists of the former hospital and nurses' quarters buildings; a third building which had been contained in the heritage listing (Anzac House & Club) was demolished c. 2005–2008.

The hospital was named after Lady Diamantina Bowen, the wife of the then Queensland Governor Sir George Bowen. Lady Bowen had been the first patron of the Ladies' Committee of the Lying-In Hospital, whose mission was to provide safe maternity facilities for women in Brisbane.

The complex was redeveloped as social housing and office space between 2005 and 2008. The former hospital is now known as Diamantina House and the former nurses' quarters now known as Roma House, while Anzac House & Club was demolished and replaced by a new five-storey building, Quentin Bryce House.

== History ==
The former Lady Bowen Hospital, on Wickham Terrace is a complex originally consisting of three (now two) buildings, the earliest of which was constructed as the second purpose built home of the Brisbane Lying-In Hospital in 1889–1890. In 1938 the Lady Bowen Hospital was superseded by the Brisbane Women's Hospital and the site on Wickham Terrace was leased for a variety of purposes. The buildings are currently occupied by various arts related organisations.

During the nineteenth century childbirth frequently resulted in the death of mother and or baby. Usually, babies were delivered in the family home with the assistance of midwives, of varying degrees of experience and training. During the time of the Moreton Bay penal settlement, care for those women who could not afford the expense of a midwife, was available from the female prison, firstly located in Queen Street and later at Eagle Farm Women's Prison. Following the closure of the female prison, destitute women were unable to find medical attention during childbirth until the formation of the Queensland Lying-In Hospital in 1864.

A committee was formed for the establishment of a lying-in hospital following a report in The Brisbane Courier of 16 August 1864 requesting those interested in the establishment of such an institution to attend a meeting at the Armoury on 19 August at 4.00pm. The committee formed as a result of this meeting lobbied the colonial government of the time for partial funding, under the provisions Hospitals Act 1862 which allowed funding to be used to assist the establishment of hospitals. Previously Queensland hospitals were established solely by public donation. The Queensland colonial government, under Governor Bowen allocated £500 toward the establishment of the first public lying-in hospital.

From the outset, the Ladies' Committee of the Lying-In Hospital sought to achieve three aims: firstly to improve midwifery standards in the state, secondly to change community attitudes toward accepting childbirth in hospitals and thirdly to promote moral reform in unwed mothers. To achieve the first aim, the training of midwives was conducted from the earliest days of the hospital in the 1860s.

On 1 September 1864, a joint committee of ladies and gentlemen of the proposed Lying-In Hospital was held to consider the objectives of the new hospital. At this meeting a Ladies' Committee was appointed in which the management of the institution was vested and comprising the wives of many early prominent Brisbane citizens. The Ladies Committee were supported by a men's committee who provided advice and reference as required. The hospital, officially called, the Queensland Lying-In Hospital was, opened on 2 November 1864 in a house, Fairview, in Leichhardt Street, Spring Hill. This was described in an advertisement in the Brisbane Courier as having six large rooms, detached kitchen and servant's room, with tank and yard. The Ladies' Committee rented Fairview for £120 per annum.

The hospital remained in this rented accommodation in Leichhardt Street until 1866 when the Lying-In Hospital was moved to a new purpose designed building in Ann Street, between Edward and Albert Streets and adjacent to the Servants' Home (later known as the Brisbane School of Arts). This was an eight roomed building with beds for twelve patients and ancillary rooms. In August 1867, this building was renamed the Lady Bowen Lying-In Hospital in recognition of the wife of Governor George Bowen, Lady Diamantina Roma Bowen. During her life in Queensland, Lady Bowen was an avid participant and organiser of charitable and social activities.

The Lady Bowen Lying-In Hospital remained in Ann Street for about twenty-five years until 1889 when a larger hospital was built, on the outskirts of the central business area of Brisbane and overlooking Albert Park. A bill was passed in parliament to allow for the sale of the hospital in Ann Street to allow the Ladies' Committee to procure land elsewhere for reasons that:

The situation is not by any means healthy, as the aspect is wrong for both breeze and sun; the situation is noisy; the present institution cannot be thoroughly cleaned without closing; and it is quite impossible to separate married women from single women, which separation is of course most desirable.

The Ann Street property was sold for £6000 and patients were transferred to a property in Wharf Street, awaiting the opening of the Wickham Terrace Hospital. In October 1888 the Ladies Committee acquired the Wickham Terrace property, where formerly the house of Reginald Heber Roe, Head Master of Brisbane Grammar School was sited. Roe moved from his Wickham Terrace residence, known as Winholm, to a boarding house on the Brisbane Grammar site. Winholm is thought to have been demolished to make way for the lying-in hospital, certainly neither documentary or physical evidence suggests that the house has been retained within the hospital complex.

Following the acquisition of the land, the Ladies' Committee commissioned Brisbane architect, John Hingestone Buckeridge to design the new two storeyed hospital. Buckeridge arrived in Brisbane in February 1887 to take up his appointment as the Diocesan architect for the Bishop of Brisbane, Dr William Webber. Previously, Buckeridge worked in London as an architect following his training with prominent British ecclesiastical architect, John Loughborough Pearson and studied at the Royal Academy of Arts and the Architectural Association. His appointment to the Diocese of Brisbane was to assist Webber on an ambitious church building program. Following the death of his wife, Buckeridge accepted the position in Queensland where one of his principal jobs was the supervision of the St John's Church of England Cathedral, designed by his former principal, JL Pearson. Buckeridge worked in the position of Diocesan Architect officially until 1902 although for many of the later years he lived in Sydney. He designed about 60 timber churches throughout south east Queensland, including Christ Church, Milton (1891); along with a number of public and commercial buildings including the Gresham Hotel.

The design Buckeridge provided for the Lady Bowen Hospital was for a two storeyed brick building with substantial basement level and with capacity for fifty patients. The building was constructed by local contractor, John Quinn who won the tender for construction of the building for £6,200. The ground floor of the building housed an entrance hall, a sewing room for nurses and wards with bathrooms and linen rooms, Above on the first floor, were a number of wards, and below in the basement were the nurses' dining room and kitchens. A separate building to the rear of the hospital was used for septic cases.

The foundation stone of the new hospital was laid by Lady Alice Norman, wife of Queensland Governor Henry Wylie Norman, on 29 May 1889. The hospital was officially opened on Saturday 28 December 1889 by Lady O'Connell. The first patients were admitted to the hospital on 1 January 1890. No major additions or alterations were made to the complex until 1923 when the government approved the expenditure of £15,000 for the construction of a Nurses' Quarters to the west of the original building.

The introduction of the Hospitals Act 1923 established an alternate structure with regional hospital boards for the management of Queensland hospitals. The management of the Lady Bowen Lying-In Hospital was vested in the Brisbane and South Coast Hospital Board from 1924. This brought about standardised practice throughout Queensland hospitals and official government contributions to the funding of hospitals. The Queensland Government took over full responsibility for the running of hospitals in 1945. The Ladies' Committee officially disbanded in 1924, although they retained an advisory role on the new board of management.

By the 1920s, the Lady Bowen Hospital was seen to require upgrading and repairs. With growing concern over the high incidence of infant mortality, legislation was passed in the form of the Maternity Act 1922 to provide support and care for children and mothers. The Hospitals Board commissioned a report from the Professor of Obstetrics at the University of Sydney who recommended the construction of a new obstetrics hospital in the grounds of the Brisbane General Hospital at Herston. The Hospitals Board were given government approval and funding in line with government platform, increasing support for women's and children's healthcare. The construction of a new obstetrics hospital, known as the Brisbane Women's Hospital was approved in 1929 and was opened in 1938. During this period Lady Bowen continued to operate and an operating theatre was constructed and sewerage system installed.

The Lady Bowen Hospital was closed and staff and patients were transferred to the new women's hospital which opened on 26 March 1938. This heralded an era of short term leasees and alterations to the buildings of the former Lady Bowen Hospital which continues to the present day. The many tenants who have occupied the buildings since 1938 include the Bridge Board, the Social Service League, Essential and Emergency Services of the Civil Defence Organisation, the Australian Army Canteen Services, the Stanley River Works Board, the Returned Sailors, Soldiers and Airmen's Imperial League of Australia, the Queensland State Archives, Agricultural Project (later the Agricultural and Environmental Education Branch and later, the Brisbane Urban Environmental Education Centre), the Australian Music Examination Board, Apprenticeship Board of Queensland, Department of Health (Chest Clinic for the Division of Health and Medical Physics) and the Queensland Writers Centre.

Of the tenants who have occupied the buildings since the relocation of the hospital, the various Army related tenants during World War II were most significant. The obvious impact of this tenancy was the construction of the two storeyed timber framed and fibrous-sheeting clad building on the corner of Wickham Terrace and Robert Street. In the early stages of the War the site was occupied by the Air Raid Warden's Organisation which became later the Civil Defence Organisation. In 1943 the site was acquired for use as a serviceman's club, known as Anzac House (now demolished). During this occupation the Royal Australian Engineers Unit were responsible for the conversion of the hospital into a hostel with dining and other recreational facilities. Across Wickham Terrace, in Albert Park, a related dance pavilion was constructed. This has since been demolished.

== Description ==
The Lady Bowen Hospital complex comprises three buildings, situated on the northern side of Wickham Terrace, overlooking Albert Park. The central building is the 1890 hospital, the oldest on the site and the original two storeyed brick Lady Bowen Hospital. To the west is a 1923 two storeyed brick Nurses' Quarters and to the east of the 1890 building is a c. 1943 timber framed and fibrous sheeting clad building constructed for use as a serviceman's club.

=== Original Hospital ===
The 1890 building has a complex plan which essentially comprises a front section which addresses Wickham Terrace and a long rectangular rear ward section running east–west and connected to the front via common verandahs and the centrally located internal stair. The division of the two parts of the building indicates the original division between the front-of-house public areas of the hospital and the rear private ward section. The separation of these two sections reflects the fear of the spread of airborne germs.

The hospital is a load-bearing structure of rendered brick, with enclosed verandahs of fibrous cement sheeting and glass louvres changing the nature of the facades which assume a less articulated appearance. The building is two storeyed with a basement beneath the rear wing. The corrugated iron clad roof is complex with a series of hips, half hips and tapering hipped projections above the bay windows.

The front wing of the building was constructed as the entrance and to house the public areas of the hospital. This section has a square plan with two double storeyed bay windows articulating the facades. The principal entrance to the building is centrally located on the ground floor of the southern facade of the front wing. The entrance is flanked by segmental arched window openings glazed with three hopper panels. The rear wing is rectangular planned, as expected of early hospital ward planning with cross ventilation allowed through all internal rooms.

The northern, rear facade of the building, is lined with a modern steel framed verandah which is linked to the rear verandahs of the adjacent buildings on the site. This facade is lined with early timber framed window openings and early doors, with some more recent penetrations.

Internally, the original hospital retains much of its 1890s character, with plaster rendered walls, plaster detailing, timber boarded floors and plaster rendered ceilings concealed by a suspended grid ceiling system. The basement floor of the building has concrete floors, rendered brick walls and, in some rooms, ripple iron clad ceilings. The internal stair is located between the front core of the building and the rear wing and is a substantial nineteenth century concrete structure with extant stair window and balustrading.

It was redeveloped in 2005–08 and now operates as Diamantina House, offering 21 studio social housing units managed by Bric Housing and office space for Queensland's peak housing and homelessness body Q Shelter.

=== Former Nurses' Quarters ===
The 1923 Nurses' Quarters is a substantial two storeyed building comprising a rendered brick wing facing Wickham Terrace from the rear of which runs a long rectangular planned wing, flanked by verandahs to the east and west. The building is designed in the Arts and Crafts idiom with overscaled classical features.

The front wing is constructed to the line of the Wickham Terrace footpath and has a hipped roof clad with corrugated iron. On the ridge line of this section of the roof is a substantial eight sided timber framed fleche with pyramidal roof. The eaves of the roof overhang the walls and are lined with timber boards.

This front section of the building is constructed from brick on reinforced concrete foundations. The external elevations of this section of the building are divided into two sections, giving external expression to the internal floor levels. The lower part of the elevation, originally face brick and now painted is capped with a ceramic tiled string course. The upper section is rendered with roughcast stucco. The facade of the building is symmetrically composed around a central round arched opening giving access to a recessed porch. The arch is surrounded by brick voussoirs, a large rendered keystone and several more regularly spaced overscaled rendered voussoirs. Flanking the archway on the ground floor are two vertical hung sash windows with timber framed and mullioned glass panels. These openings are surmounted by a brick header and rendered keystone and have concrete rendered sills. Similar openings line the eastern and western side walls of this section of the building. The upper level of the front facade of the building is lined with three window openings, which are also repeated on the side walls. These openings are fitted with vertical hung sash windows and sit on the line of the first floor string course, and have no decorative mouldings. The rear of the building has a discrete hipped roof, also clad with corrugated iron sheeting, the verandahs to the east and west are infilled.

General the interior comprises concrete slab floor, rendered brick walls and partitions and fibrous sheeted ceilings housed in a decorative timber grid like system. The skirtings and cornices throughout the buildings are rendered concrete and simple in execution.

It was redeveloped in 2005–06 as Roma House, social housing accommodating 37 clients with complex needs operated by Mission Australia.

=== C1943 Building ===
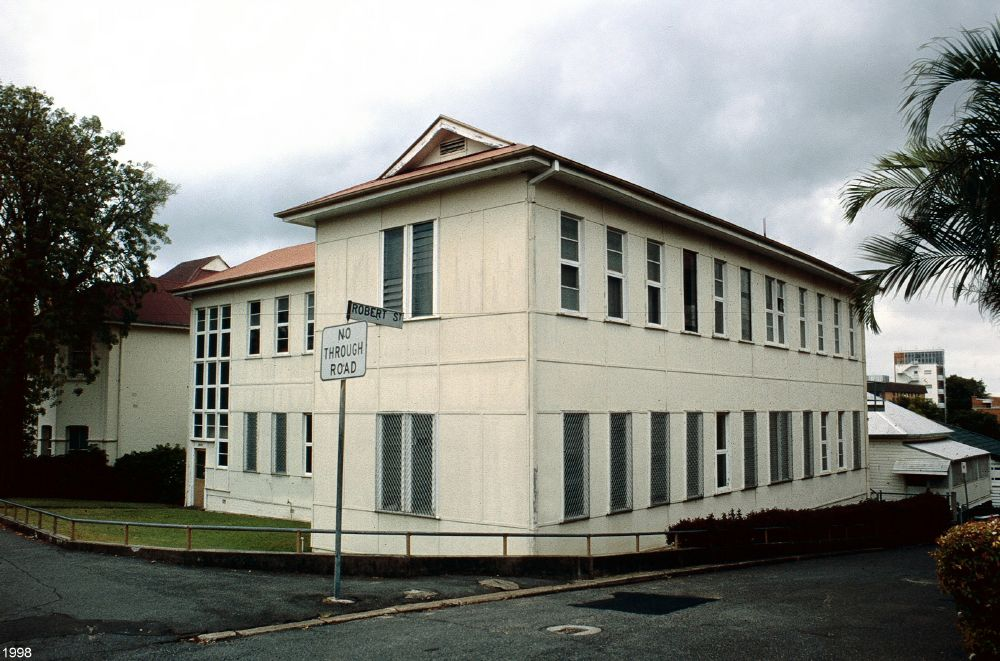
Anzac House, built circa 1943

This two storeyed buildings sits on the corner of Wickham Terrace and Robert Street and has an T-shaped plan. The building is timber framed and clad with fibrous-sheeting, which in some areas has been vandalised creating holes. The shallow pitched, half-hipped roof is clad with corrugated iron. The building is lined with discrete timber framed windows glazed with arctic glass.

The principal entrance to this building on the western end of the southern facade and is through a single half glazed door. This entrance is emphasised externally by a panel of glazing which extends upward over the two storeys of the building and also serves to light the internal stairwell which is positioned here. To the north, rear of the building is a brick service wing which houses bathroom and kitchen facilities internally.

Internally this building is lined with fibrous cement sheeting on the walls and ceilings throughout. The outer edges of the ceilings taper downwards creating a substantial cornice feature. The proliferation of windows throughout the building contribute to naturally well lit and ventilated interior spaces. The stair hall is a dog leg timber stair with balustrade clad with fibrous sheeting.

Anzac House was demolished as part of the 2005–08 redevelopment of the complex and replaced with Quentin Bryce House, a new five-storey social housing complex comprising 34 studio units for low-income seniors.

== Heritage listing ==
The former Lady Bowen Hospital was listed on the Queensland Heritage Register on 23 April 1999 having satisfied the following criteria.

The place is important in demonstrating the evolution or pattern of Queensland's history.

The former Lady Bowen Hospital, Wickham Terrace was constructed in 1890 as the second purpose built home of the Brisbane Lying-In Hospital, established to provide health care and support to pregnant women who would otherwise not receive medical care during pregnancy or at childbirth. The Ladies Committee who established and managed the hospital from its inception in 1864 to its takeover by the Brisbane and South Coast Hospitals Board in 1924, worked toward achieving major advances in the field of obstetrics in Queensland, and the Lady Bowen Hospital was the precursor of the 1938 Brisbane Women's Hospital. The place demonstrates the evolution of health care, particularly obstetrics in Queensland, beginning as a nineteenth century charitable institution and became a core government funded service.

The place demonstrates rare, uncommon or endangered aspects of Queensland's cultural heritage.

The place is a rare surviving nineteenth century Queensland hospital and a unique nineteenth century lying-in or maternity hospital.

The place is important in demonstrating the principal characteristics of a particular class of cultural places.

The place demonstrates the principle characteristics of the nineteenth century pavilion planned hospital in its location on the outskirts of the central business area, situated on an elevated site overlooking a park and also with its internal planning creating well ventilated and naturally lit wards.

The place is important because of its aesthetic significance.

The former Lady Bowen Hospital is a Brisbane landmark. The place is a large complex of sympathetically designed buildings, which despite more recent renovations, are of architectural merit, for their composition and detailing.

The place has a special association with the life or work of a particular person, group or organisation of importance in Queensland's history.

The former Lady Bowen Hospital has strong associations with the Ladies Committee who were critical in the early provision of obstetric services and the place has a special association with early patron, Lady Diamantina Roma Bowen, for whom the hospital was named.
