= Holy Trinity Rectory, Fortitude Valley =

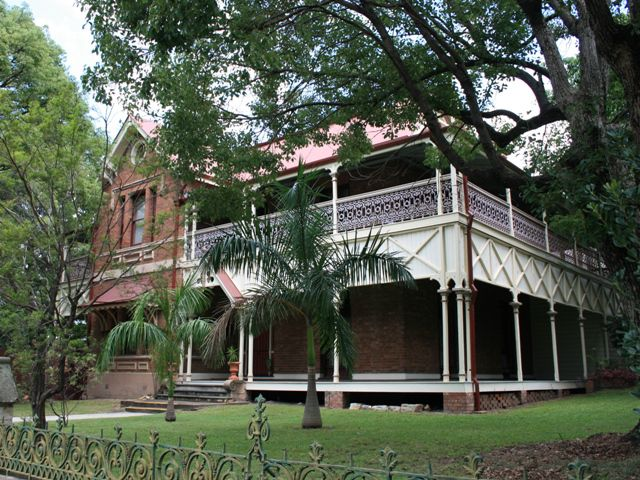
- Holy Trinity Rectory, 2009

- Location within Queensland Location within Australia
- 27.4541°S 153.038°E
- Location: 141 Brookes Street, Fortitude Valley, City of Brisbane, Queensland, Australia

History
- Design period: 1870s–1890s (late 19th century)
- Built: 1889

Site notes
- Architect: Francis Drummond Greville Stanley

Queensland Heritage Register
- Official name: Holy Trinity Rectory
- Type: state heritage (built)
- Designated: 21 October 1992
- Reference no.: 600201
- Significant period: 1880s (fabric); 1880s– (social, historical)
- Significant components: fence/wall – perimeter, garden/grounds, service wing, wall/s – retaining, fence/wall – dividing, residential accommodation – rectory
- Builders: James Robinson

Holy Trinity Rectory is a heritage-listed Anglican clergy house at 141 Brookes Street, Fortitude Valley, City of Brisbane, Queensland, Australia. It was designed by Francis Drummond Greville Stanley and built in 1889 by James Robinson. It was added to the Queensland Heritage Register on 21 October 1992.

== History ==
The Holy Trinity Rectory at 141 Brookes Street, Fortitude Valley is a two-storeyed brick building constructed in 1889 to a design prepared by former Queensland Colonial Architect Francis Drummond Greville Stanley.

The Church of England was the first institutional religion established in Queensland, with the parish of St John's in Brisbane created in 1849 as part of the Diocese of Newcastle. Land bounded by George, William and Elizabeth streets was granted to the church and St John's Church was consecrated on this site in 1854. This parish encompassed a wide district which extended well beyond the Brisbane town boundary and included Milton, Enoggera and Sandgate.

By the mid-1850s a village of 100 to 150 houses had been established at Fortitude Valley just north of the Brisbane town boundary and there were more homes scattered through the semi-bush to the north and east. For Valley residents, access to St John's Church at the southern end of North Brisbane was difficult. Principal access was via the steep, unformed track of Ann Street over Duncan's Hill, which was not cut down until the 1860s and 1870s. Wickham Street did not exist at this period; in its place was a series of ponds and brickyards.

In recognition of the increasing settlement of the district north of Brisbane, part of St John's parish separated in 1856 to form Holy Trinity parish. The new parish encompassed the areas of Fortitude Valley, Bowen Hills and New Farm and extended west to Enoggera and north to Sandgate. At first a cottage was rented at the corner of Ann and Ballow Streets for use as a Church of England school on weekdays and as a place of worship on Sundays. In 1857 the New South Wales government granted to the parish two acres of land bounded by Ann, Brookes, Church and Wickham streets for church purposes (the present site of the Holy Trinity Church, this rectory and the parish hall). In the same year a long, stone building was erected on this site for use as a school room and temporary church.

The Diocese of Brisbane was formed in 1859, with Bishop Edward Tufnell taking office as the first Bishop of Brisbane in 1860. At this time St John's Church was designated as the pro-Cathedral, and Holy Trinity parish was incorporated into the Diocese of Brisbane.

The first Holy Trinity rectory was built for Rev. John Mosely who was appointed in 1861. It was a stone building situated in Leichhardt Street between Quarry and Love streets, on a crown land grant to the Church which extended through to Water Street.

During the 1860s and 1870s Fortitude Valley developed as a commercial and residential centre and population density in the Valley and surrounding areas increased substantially. The 1857 stone building was enlarged in 1862 to accommodate an expanding congregation and by the mid-1870s Holy Trinity parish was committed to the construction of a new, larger church on the Brookes Street site. Designed in 1875 by the then Queensland Colonial Architect, FDG Stanley, the second Holy Trinity church was erected in 1876–77 by contractor James Robinson. The 1857 stone church/school building remained in use as a schoolroom.

As the parish grew, the disadvantages of having the rectory separated from the church eventually led to the construction in 1889 of a new rectory in Brookes Street, adjacent to Holy Trinity Church, at a cost of £1,935. Like the 1876–77 church, the second rectory was designed by FDG Stanley and constructed by builder James Robinson.

Stanley was born in Edinburgh in 1839 and trained in Scotland as an architect. He emigrated to Brisbane in 1862 and practised privately before gaining employment with the Queensland Government in the office of the Colonial Architect, Charles Tiffin, in 1863. Following Tiffin's retirement Stanley was appointed Colonial Architect from 1 January 1872, a position he held until 1881. Throughout this period of government employment he accepted a number of private commissions and continued in private practice in Brisbane, Maryborough and Toowoomba after he left the public service. Stanley was a prolific architect and his work is found throughout Queensland.

Stanley's design for Holy Trinity Rectory was for a substantial brick house of two storeys with broad verandahs on both levels, projecting gables and a corrugated iron roof. Some of the stone from the former rectory in Leichhardt Street was recycled in a retaining wall along the Brookes Street boundary.

The 1889 residence continues to function as Holy Trinity Rectory.

== Description ==
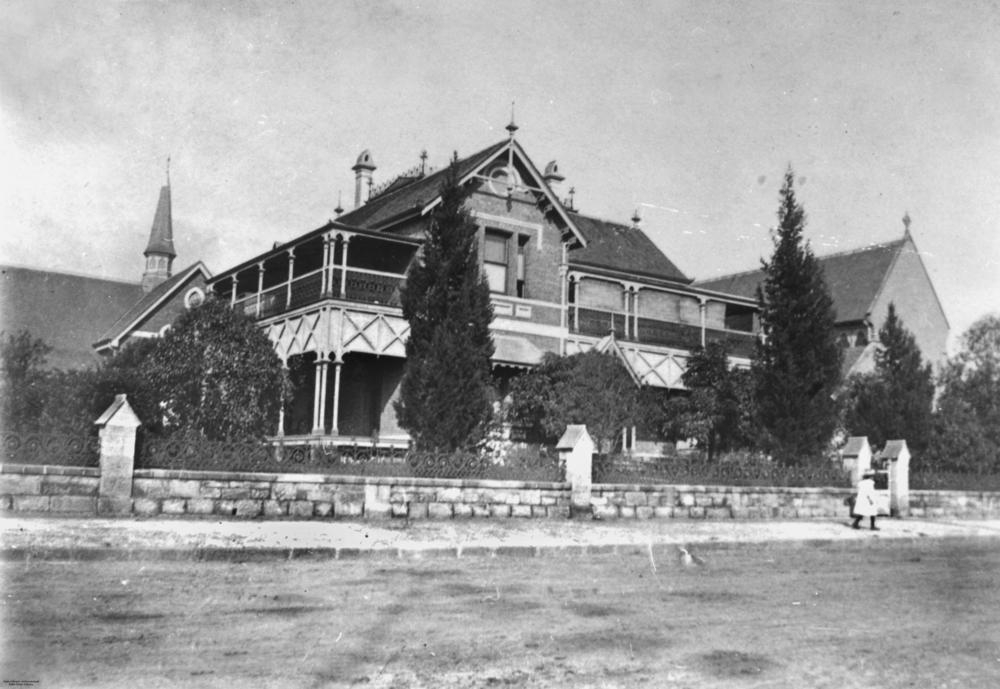
Rectory, circa 1910

The Holy Trinity Rectory (1889) is situated adjacent to Holy Trinity Church (1876–77 with additions 1920–21 and 1929) and Holy Trinity Parish Hall (1891) in Fortitude Valley. All three buildings are located on a site bounded by Brookes, Church and Wickham streets at the northern end of Fortitude Valley. They complement each other in terms of scale, materials (each is of brick construction), use of Gothic stylistic elements and garden settings. The rectory is positioned to the south east of the church, fronting Brookes Street and to the north east of the parish hall, which faces Church Street.

The rectory is a two-storeyed brick building with verandahs to both floors. It has a core hipped roof and projecting gables to three elevations. At the rear is an attached, two-storeyed timber service wing with a hipped roof. All the roofs are clad with galvanized iron and the core roof has a ridge vent. Three single brick chimneys with vaulted tops rise above this roof and there is an external brick chimney at the end of the timber service wing.

The main gabled elevation to Brookes Street has a rendered plinth and is decorated with a rendered band at the upper floor level, rendered window sills, label moulds and panels below the windows. The projecting roof gable is supported on fretwork timber brackets and there is a circular vent to the gable peak. Windows in the projecting gable are in sets of three to each floor, with narrow brick mullions. The ground floor window in this gabled projection has a corrugated iron hood supported on decorative timber brackets.

The ground floor verandahs are supported on squat brick piers, with square timber verandah posts with cap moulds and brackets but no balustrade. A deep frieze below the upper floor has exposed timber cross-bracing with vertically jointed boards behind. The upper floor verandahs have the same square timber verandah posts as the ground floor, supporting skillion verandah roofs of galvanized iron separate to the main roof. The upper verandahs have a cast iron balustrade. The rear verandah has been enclosed with timber boards.

Most of the interior walls are of brick with a smooth plaster finish and most rooms have simple cornices and a high, narrow picture rail. Some rooms have decorative moulded plaster ceiling roses, but overall the decoration is very restrained. French doors open to the verandahs.

The building is set back from the street in a simple garden setting. There is a low retaining wall of rusticated, coursed stonework along the Brookes Street road alignment in front of the rectory. A timber picket fence separates the rectory yard from the church grounds.

== See also ==
- Holy Trinity Church, Fortitude Valley
- Holy Trinity Parish Hall, Fortitude Valley
