= Christ Church, Childers =

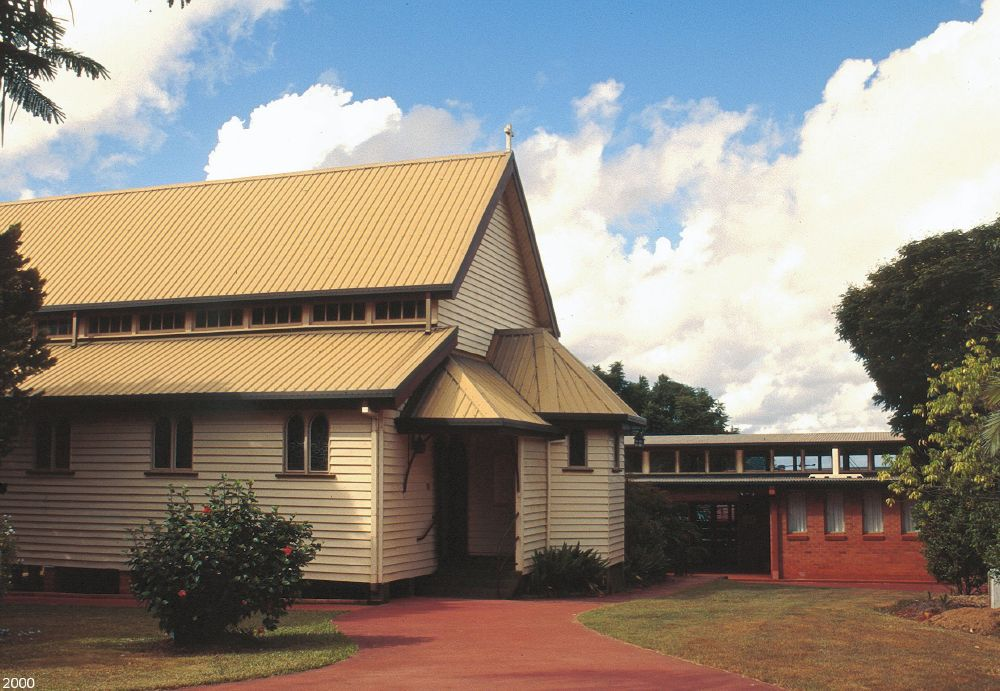
- Christ Church, 2000

- Location within Queensland Location within Australia
- 25.2377°S 152.2774°E
- Location: 24 Macrossan Street, Childers, Bundaberg Region, Queensland, Australia

History
- Design period: 1900–1914 (early 20th century)
- Built: 1900–1958

Site notes
- Architect: John Hingeston Buckeridge
- Architectural style: Gothic

Queensland Heritage Register
- Official name: Christ Church, Childers, Anglican Church
- Type: state heritage (built, landscape)
- Designated: 28 April 2000
- Reference no.: 601994
- Significant period: 1900s (historical); 1900s (fabric); 1940–1960 (fabric stained glass) ongoing (social)
- Significant components: views from, furniture/fittings, baptistry, church, stained glass window/s, views to

Christ Church is a heritage-listed church at 24 Macrossan Street (on the corner of McIlwraith Street), Childers, Bundaberg Region, Queensland, Australia. It was designed by John Hingeston Buckeridge and built from 1900 to 1958. It is also known as the Anglican Church. It was added to the Queensland Heritage Register on 28 April 2000.

== History ==
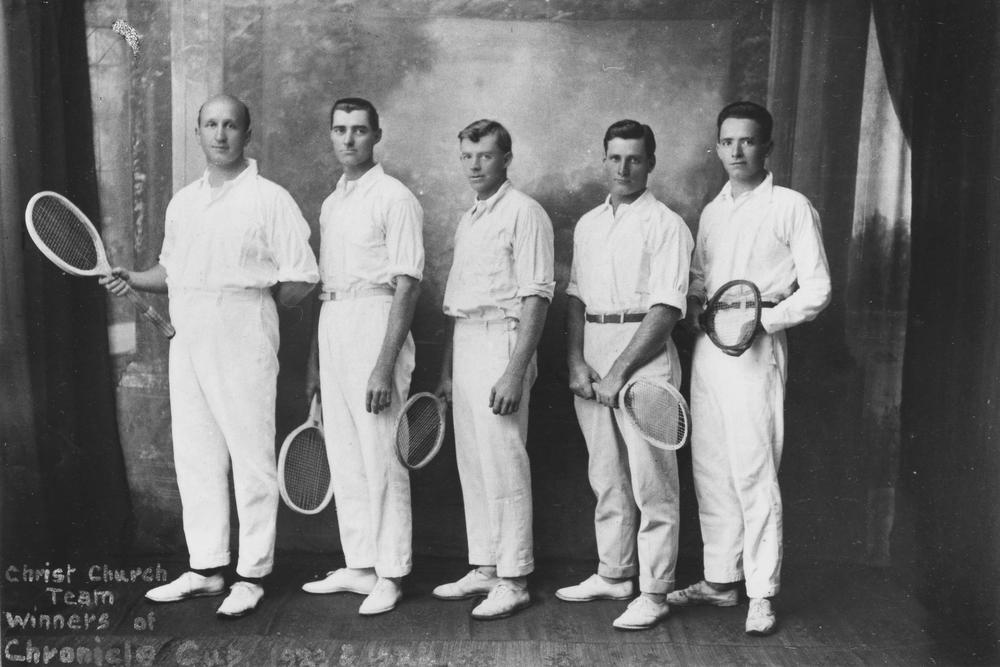
Members of the Christ Church tennis team who won the Chronicle Cup, Childers, 1923

Christ Church, Childers is a timber church constructed to the design of Anglican Church architect J H Buckeridge in 1900 is the second church to be built on the site on the corner of Macrossan and McIllwraith Streets.

In early 1888, an application was made for a grant to build a church at Isis Scrub. By June, The Church Chronicle reported that £25 had been given towards the construction and by November a small hardwood church, the first Christ Church, was opened. The development of religious institutions in Childers reflected the more general consolidation of the town. Christ Church was initially part of the Howard Parish and was ministered to by the itinerant parish priest, Father J.E Clayton. From the time of the dedication of this early church, the congregation lobbied for their own resident priest and a more substantial church building. Father W.S Marshall became the first resident priest appointed to Childers in 1898 following the offer of Mr James Equestrian to pay the priest's stipend for the first year of appointment.

In 1899, the Brisbane Diocese's architect John H Buckeridge was approached by the Building Committee to prepare plans for a new and bigger church in Childers. The Committee had considered other designs prepared by Buckeridge for the Church of England and the design of Christ Church has a close relationship to Buckeridge's other timber churches, particularly St Colomb's in Clayfield which opened in December 1899.

John Buckeridge came to Queensland upon the request of Bishop William Webber and at the recommendation of J.L Pearson, eminent English architect and designer of St John's Cathedral, Brisbane. Webber was Bishop of Queensland from 1885 and undertook an ambitious church building program throughout the state. He was not content with merely building churches but was intent upon them being well designed works of ecclesiastical architecture and it was for that reason he invited Buckeridge to come to Queensland in 1887 and formalised the position of Diocesan architect. Buckeridge was Diocesan Architect at a time when Queensland's population was expanding and there was a high demand for church buildings. It has been said that "Buckeridge's churches were more than simple timber and tin chapels. He had the architectural ability to set them apart from the generally more pedestrian buildings of other denominations." His church architecture was a loose interpretation of the Gothic Revival style and used good quality local materials in an economical manner with attention to the need to design appropriately for Queensland's sub-tropical climate.

Initial tenders submitted for Buckeridge's design for Christ Church were considered too high and the plans were modified in December 1899 to meet the budget. Local builder, Mr Irwin signed a contract for £540 which included a price for the pews which were also designed by Buckeridge. The building was constructed during 1900 and the work was supervised by Bundaberg architect, Frederic Herbert Faircloth. Faircloth practised in Bundaberg from the early 1890s and was responsible for many buildings in Childers, particularly after a huge fire destroyed much of the main street in 1902.

Canon Eva, the priest at St. Paul's Church, Maryborough opened and dedicated Christ Church on 9 May 1901 to co-incide with the formation of a separate parish based in Childers. The first parish priest was Father Thomas Ashburner. The original church was put into use as a parish hall, until 1967 when it was sold for removal and a new masonry Memorial Hall was constructed. The congregation continued to make changes to the church and precinct over time. In 1906, a house was purchased for £330 for use as a rectory. During the 1920s and 30s the church was painted several times, a fence was erected and in 1932 the Brand and Gant families presented memorial gates and a font. Parishioners also donated several sets of stained glass windows during this period and all except for a single window in the side chapel were to the design of renowned stained glazier and artist William Bustard.

Bustard worked for R S Exton and Co from 1921 until the closure of the company's glass studio in 1958. Bustard was a prolific designer and producer of high quality stained glass and his work is featured in many of Queensland's outstanding buildings of the early twentieth century, including a number of churches for the Anglican church. Many of his windows for Christ Church depict scenes from the life of Jesus Christ from the Annunciation to the Ascension. Six stained glass windows were installed in the sanctuary and baptistery in 1940–41. A further six pairs were dedicated in May 1947, having been installed over several preceding years. By 1958, all the church windows in the nave had been fitted with stained glass designed by Bustard. A more recent window in the side chapel, depicting Christ Church surrounded by local fauna and flora was installed in 1992.

The interior of the church which was originally unpainted, was painted in the 1950s. At the same time, the vestry was lined and the timber stumps were replaced with brick piers. The church was again painted in 1975 and the roof cladding was replaced in 1983. The sanctuary was re-lined with imitation timber panelling in 1984 and an alabaster set of Stations of the Cross were donated by the Percival family in 1994. The Christ Church Parish now has churches in Childers, Apple Tree Creek, Cordalba, Howard and Torbanlea as well as conducting services in Woodgate and Burrum Heads.

A recent inventory of parish churches within the Brisbane Dioceses has found that of the surviving twenty-two timber buildings designed by Buckeridge for the Anglican church, only five are identified as sustaining their design intactness, having experienced only minor changes such as changes to roofing materials and the additions of linings. Christ Church, Childers is considered the most intact of these.

== Description ==
Christ Church, Childers is a timber building located on Macrossan Street, a secondary street running parallel to the main street of the town of Childers. Views of the church are gained from McIllwraith Street as it slopes away towards the cane fields which provide a backdrop to the church. The church is set back from the street and is accessed via a wide red concrete driveway. It is low-set on brick piers and is clad in painted weatherboards of a creamy colour. The roof is steeply pitched and finished in "trimdeck", wide-pan steel roof sheeting in a dull brown colour-bonded finish. The gable ends are surmounted by small timber crosses.

The building has a five bay nave, a chancel with a Northern vestry, side aisles and a polygonal baptistry flanked by two entry porches. The baptistry has a hipped roof with three triangular segments that create a distinctive feature on the western elevation of the building to the street. The chancel is separately roofed with a steeply pitched roof that extends on the northern end to roof the vestry. The side aisles and porches also have separate skillion roofs, providing space for bands of clerestory windows on the northern and southern walls. The clerestory windows are fixed windows with cusped heads, arranged in groups of four and filled with coloured glass in muted tones of yellow, pink and green. The northern and southern walls each have five pairs of timber lancet windows, all of which are fitted with stained glass.

The windows depict the story of the life of Christ and contain a number of repeated motifs such as a town of clustered white-washed buildings with a middle eastern appearance, palm trees and flowers such as purple irises and daffodils. The baptistry also has three lancet windows set with stained glass depicting the baptism of Christ, Christ as a baby being brought to the temple and Christ with the children. A tripartite lancet stained glass window with a common sill is located high in the eastern gable in the back wall of the sanctuary.

The interior of the church has an open timbered ceiling lined with diagonally laid boards that have been painted in an ochre colour. At each fifth rafter there are arch braced, scissor trusses that are tied at eaves level by metal rods. Each arched brace continues below the line of the clerestory and lands on a timber post. A second line of arches runs perpendicular to the roof trusses between the aisle posts along the length of the side aisles. These slender, pointed timber arches spring from moulded capitals on the aisle posts. The side aisle rafters also have arched bracing members in keeping with the truss bracing. The wide, gently pointed chancel arch springs from a timber moulding that runs around the sanctuary, forming a sill to the eastern windows.

Walls throughout the interior are lined with vertical, v-j pine boards that have been painted white. Aisle posts are painted in a dark brown and the timber pews are unpainted. The aisles and sanctuary are carpeted and the sanctuary is raised six steps above the nave floor. The organ and (unused) pulpit are located against the northern wall, adjacent to the vestry. The vestry is entered via a lancet arched door opening and has a similar door leading to a set of external stairs. A bell mounted in a timber frame is located next to the landing of the vestry steps. The vestry contains framed photographs of the past priests of Christ Church and other pieces of memorabilia.

The baptistry is separated from the nave by a lancet arched opening flanked by timber posts with moulded capitals and the floor is raised two steps above the nave floor. The baptistry is a small, five-sided space that contains a sandstone font, a tall timber candleholder and a small shelf with anointing oil. To either side of the baptistry are lancet arched door openings leading to the entry porches. Adjacent to the southern door are three timber honour boards.

A low-set brick parish hall is located on the southern side of the church and a timber rectory facing Macrossan Street is to the north- east, separated from the church by steel fencing.

== Heritage listing ==
Christ Church, Childers was listed on the Queensland Heritage Register on 28 April 2000 having satisfied the following criteria.

The place is important in demonstrating the evolution or pattern of Queensland's history.

Christ Church, Childers is important in demonstrating the evolution of Queensland's history having been constructed during a period of unprecedented growth in the Isis, when Childers emerged as the centre of a substantial sugar-growing district and major social, cultural and religious institutions were established in the town.

The place demonstrates rare, uncommon or endangered aspects of Queensland's cultural heritage.

The church has a fine and rare set of windows by distinguished artist and stained glazier William Bustard, which are among the aesthetically significant features of the building. As a surviving intact timber church designed by John Buckeridge during his time as Diocesan Architect, Christ Church demonstrates rare aspects of Queensland's cultural heritage.

The place is important in demonstrating the principal characteristics of a particular class of cultural places.

Christ Church, Childers demonstrates the principal characteristics of a timber church located in a small rural settlement. Key features of the church include the simple building form, steeply pitched gable roof and the free interpretation of the Gothic Revival style evidenced by the use of lancet window and door openings and pointed arches.

The place is important because of its aesthetic significance.

Christ Church, Childers is a refined piece of architectural design, in particular the elegant timber detailing of the interior of the church has aesthetic significance. The church has a fine and rare set of windows by distinguished artist and stained glazier William Bustard, which are among the aesthetically significant features of the building. As a surviving intact timber church designed by John Buckeridge during his time as Diocesan Architect, Christ Church demonstrates rare aspects of Queensland's cultural heritage.

The place has a strong or special association with a particular community or cultural group for social, cultural or spiritual reasons.

Christ Church, Childers has strong and special associations with the Anglican Parish of Childers as their principal place of worship for 100 years.

The place has a special association with the life or work of a particular person, group or organisation of importance in Queensland's history.

The church also has special associations with the architect John Buckeridge, who made an important contribution to the development of church architecture in Queensland, and notable Queensland artist and stained glazier William Bustard.
