= Christ Church, Milton =

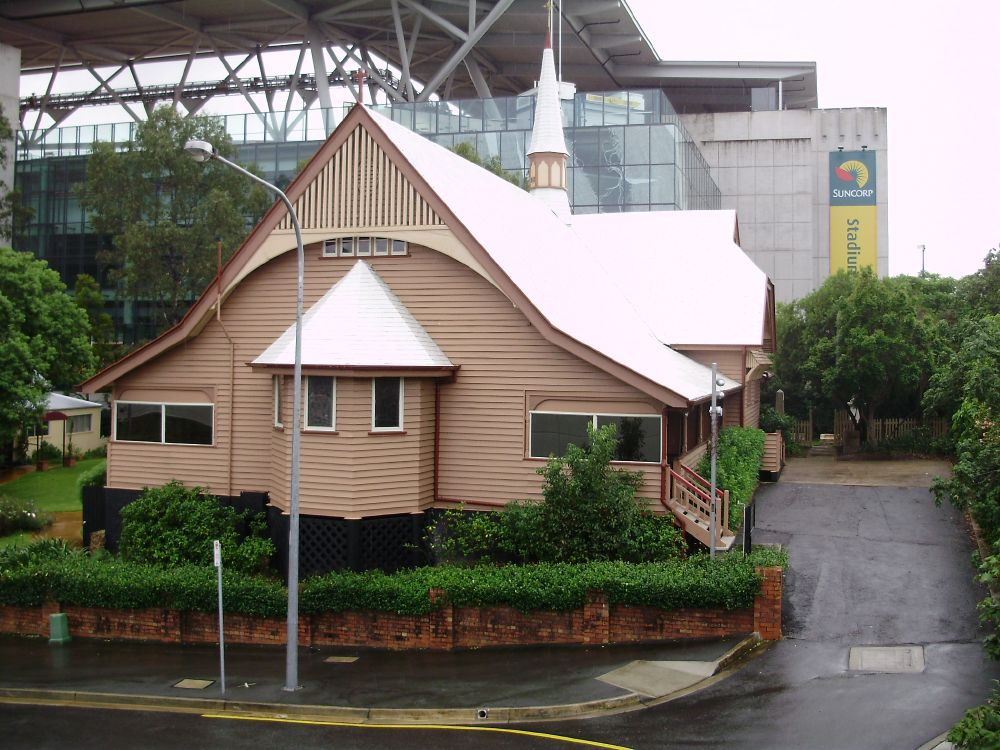
- Christ Church, with Suncorp Stadium behind, 2009

- Location within Queensland
- 27.4661°S 153.01°E
- Location: 3 Chippendall Street, Milton, City of Brisbane, Queensland, Australia

History
- Design period: 1870s–1890s (late 19th century)
- Built: 1891

Site notes
- Architect: John H. Buckeridge. F.D.G. Stanley

Queensland Heritage Register
- Official name: Christ Church, Memorial Church (former)
- Type: state heritage (built)
- Designated: 21 October 1992
- Reference no.: 600252
- Significant period: 1883, 1891 (fabric); 1876 (historical)
- Significant components: hall, stained glass window/s, grave marker, memorial – honour board/ roll of honour, furniture/fittings, pipe organ, trees/plantings, residential accommodation – rectory

Christ Church is a heritage-listed Anglican church at 3 Chippendall Street, Milton, City of Brisbane, Queensland, Australia. The current church building is the second one at this site and was designed by John H Buckeridge and built in 1891 as a "temporary" structure but remains in use to this day. The rectory was built in 1883 to a design of F.D.G. Stanley. It is also known as the former Memorial Church. It was added to the Queensland Heritage Register on 21 October 1992.

== History ==
The ecclesiastical precinct at Christ Church, Milton, contains a timber church and rectory and a memorial reserve. The church was designed in 1891 by J H Buckeridge for use as both a Sunday school and a temporary church. The rectory was built in 1883 to a design of F.D.G. Stanley.

The parish has a close association with the Paddington Cemetery, first major burial ground in Brisbane. Established in the early 1840s bordering on Boundary Street, now called Hale Street, the cemetery was divided into sections serving six Christian denominations and the Jewish community. During the 1860s and early 1870s, the Anglican community in Milton held services in the mortuary chapel which served their portion of the cemetery. In 1873 the Parish of Milton was formed and served a larger area than is presently the case, extending to Paddington, Enoggera, Red Hill, Milton, Rosalie, Torwood and Auchenflower. From 1875 burials at the cemetery ceased.

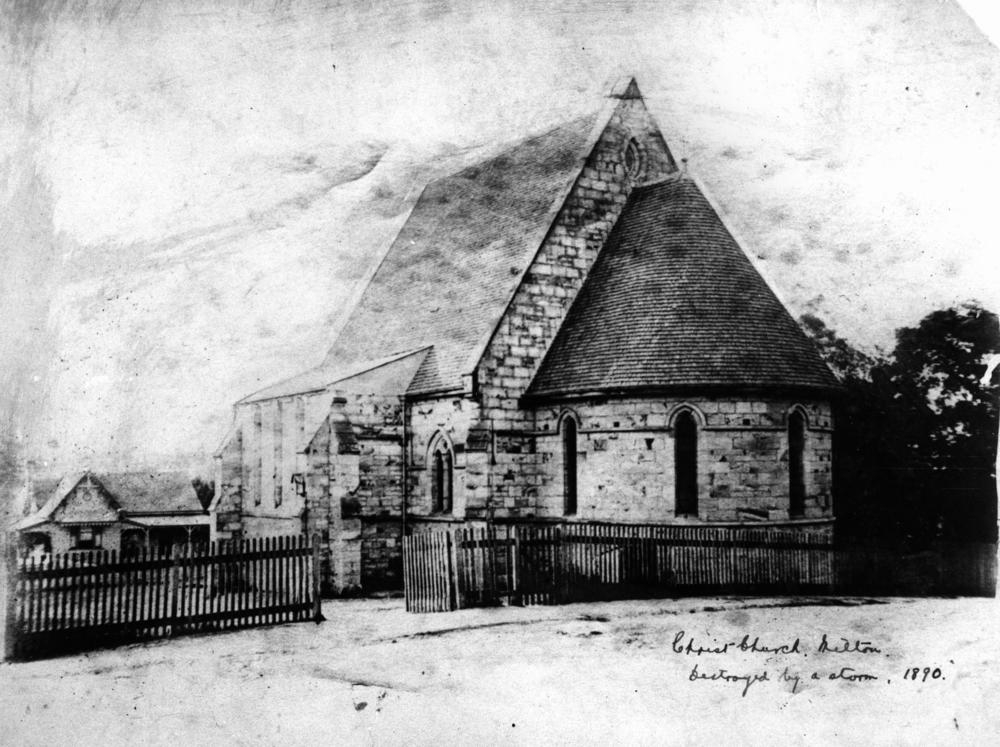
The first Christ Church at Milton, Brisbane, Queensland, Australia before it was destroyed by a storm in 1890

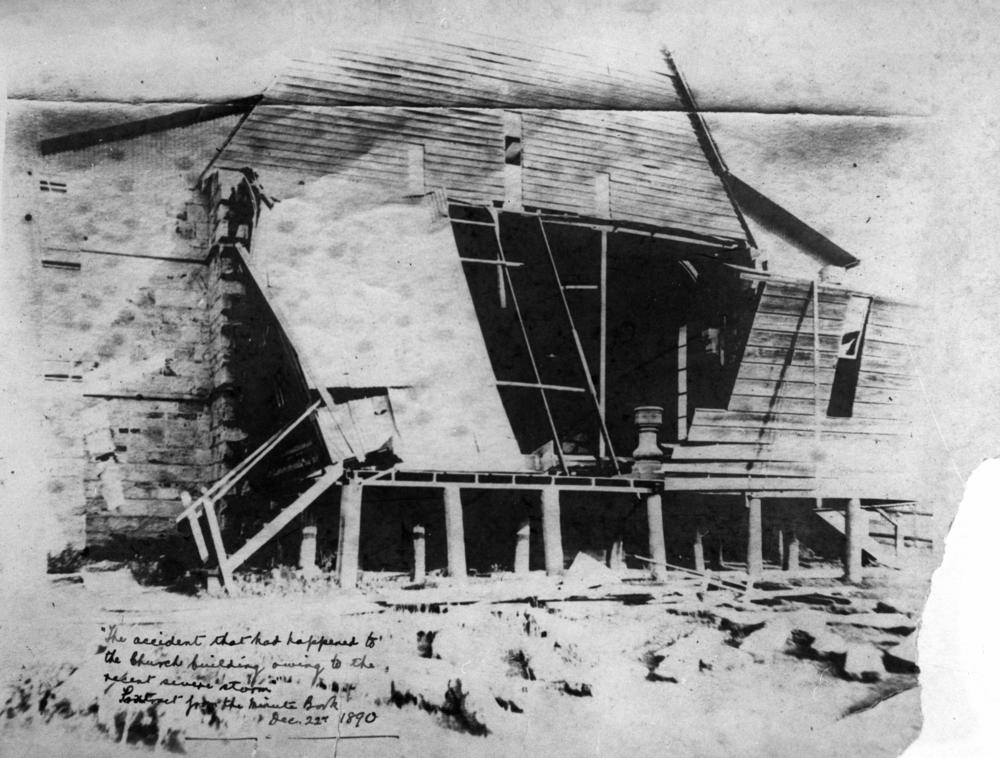
Storm damage to the original Christ Church at Milton in 1890

By 1874, the congregation had grown to the point where it needed a larger, more permanent church building. A parcel of land adjacent to the Anglican section of the cemetery was purchased and a stone church constructed to the design of Richard Suter, lay preacher to the congregation and diocesan architect. It was dedicated on 16 January 1876 to the memory of these buried in the adjacent cemetery. Even though funds had been supplemented by borrowing, it was not possible to complete the church as designed and the western end was finished in brick and timber. A rectory was also provided for the parish priest. Additional land was purchased close to the church in 1882 and a timber dwelling in Gothic style was built to the design of F.D.G. Stanley in early 1883. In 1888 the church and rectory allotments were amalgamated into a whole by the purchase of two adjoining blocks.

The foundations to the new church proved to be faulty, necessitating costly repairs. Extensive damage was also sustained during a severe storm in 1890, after which it was decided to sell the church for demolition. A large Sunday School hall was also needed as the population of the area grew. In 1890 there were 250 pupils and 600 in 1900 as the suburbs developed. In the nineteenth century, Sunday schools were thought to be very important, not only to teach religion, where government education was secular, but to mould character and encourage a high standard of ethics in adult life. The congregation could not afford two buildings and so a practical compromise was made in which the new hall was designed to also serve as an interim church.

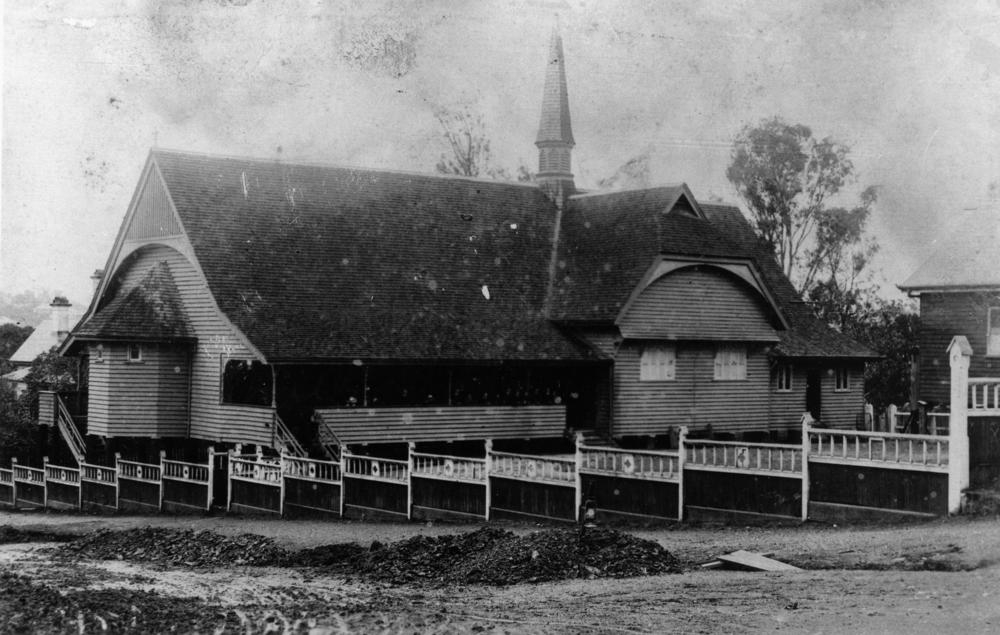
The second and current Christ Church, Milton, Brisbane, Queensland, Australia, 1912

The new church/school was designed by J.H. Buckeridge. He had been engaged in 1886 as Diocesan Architect by Bishop William Webber, whose vision for the Church in Queensland included the erection of substantial new buildings to serve an expanding population. Although many could not be expensive, they were lifted above the ordinary by Buckeridge through quality of design and materials. Christ Church is possibly his most innovative design and was built for £920 by Lars Anderson, a Danish sawmiller and builder based at Esk. Anderson and his two brothers were very successful in this industry, partly because he had been instrumental in developing a system of light rail to extract timber from areas which were previously inaccessible due to difficult terrain. It is probable that Andersen was chosen rather than a local builder because he had constructed St Agnes Anglican Church at Esk. St Agnes was also designed by Buckeridge and the Milton parish priest, Rev. J. F. Leighton, had previously been rector at Esk. The choice is justified in the quality of Andersen's work evident in Christ Church. The timber used was shipped down from the Esk valley and the design made full use of the attributes of the various species.

The stump capping ceremony took place on 4 June 1891. The building was opened and dedicated by Bishop Webber on 18 September 1891. The new church/hall building was placed on a different location within the allotment to the existing church as this continued in use while the hall was built. Some furnishings were transferred, including a stone baptismal font donated to the first chapel by Andrew Petrie. Due to the financial constraints under which the church was operating, and the original perception of the place as principally serving as a Sunday School, many of the furnishings of the church were added later. The roof was originally clad in timber shingles.

From the beginning the church served not only the residents of the surrounding area, but also the staff and inmates of the nearby Brisbane Gaol at Petrie Terrace. It ministered to the needs of the neighbouring garrison at Victoria Barracks and provided spiritual support to outlying communities. The parish established a number of social activities including a men's society, ladies' guild and girl's friendly society, but it also made an important contribution to the wider community by the foundation by the Mother's Union of a home nursing service that was to evolve into St Luke's Nursing Service.

The old cemetery grounds fell into disrepair and in 1911 the land was resumed for public purposes. Although some burials were re-interred in other cemeteries, in many cases only the headstones were relocated. In 1912–14 over 500 headstones were removed to a memorial reserve set aside within the boundary of the old Anglican cemetery section, which contained some twenty four burials. During the Depression most of these stones were removed and destroyed. In 1914, Lang Park sports ground was developed on the cemetery site.

Between 1905 and 1908, a timber hall was built to the east of the church and in 1918 additions and alterations were made including the replacement of the roof shingles with asbestos cement tiles and the acquisition of a larger organ which necessitated alterations to the floor and ceiling. Changes to the fabric of the church have otherwise been minor.

The spire was damaged by a storm in 1985 and was rebuilt without the ventilation louvres.

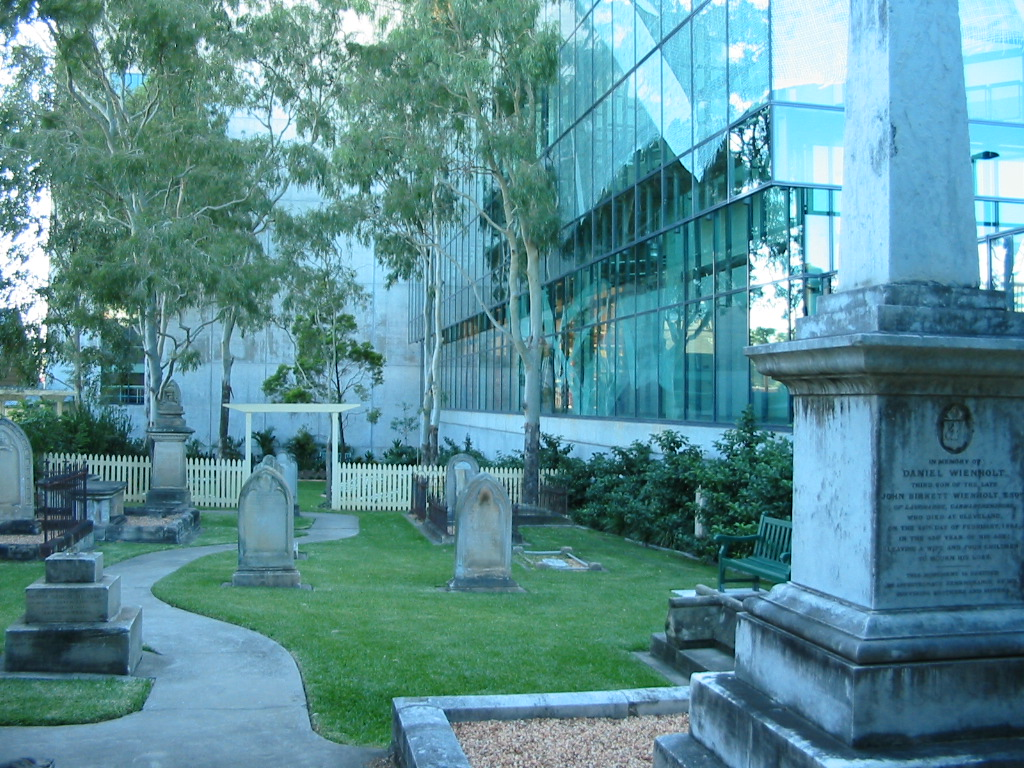
Memorial reserve, 2005. The blue tinge in the photo is due to the sunlight reflecting on the blue curtain walls of Suncorp Stadium.

In 1987 a ring road was proposed which meant resumption of a substantial section of the church grounds including part of the Memorial Reserve. In spite of strong objections by the congregation and community, road construction went ahead in 1989/90. The hall was demolished and the headstones were relocated within the remaining memorial reserve, which contains some early burials and provides evidence for use of this area as Brisbane's first public cemetery.

The expansion of the adjacent Lang Park sports ground (now Suncorp Stadium) in about 2001 further encroached on the church. Given the height of these modern developments, the church can no longer easily be seen from the surrounding area. The church can no longer be accessed from Hale Street but can be reached from Chippendall Street.

Despite the original intention of the hall serving only as an intermediate church, the building continues in use as a church to this day. The timber stumps have been replaced by low wall of concrete blocks and there are modern toilets built underneath.

== Description ==
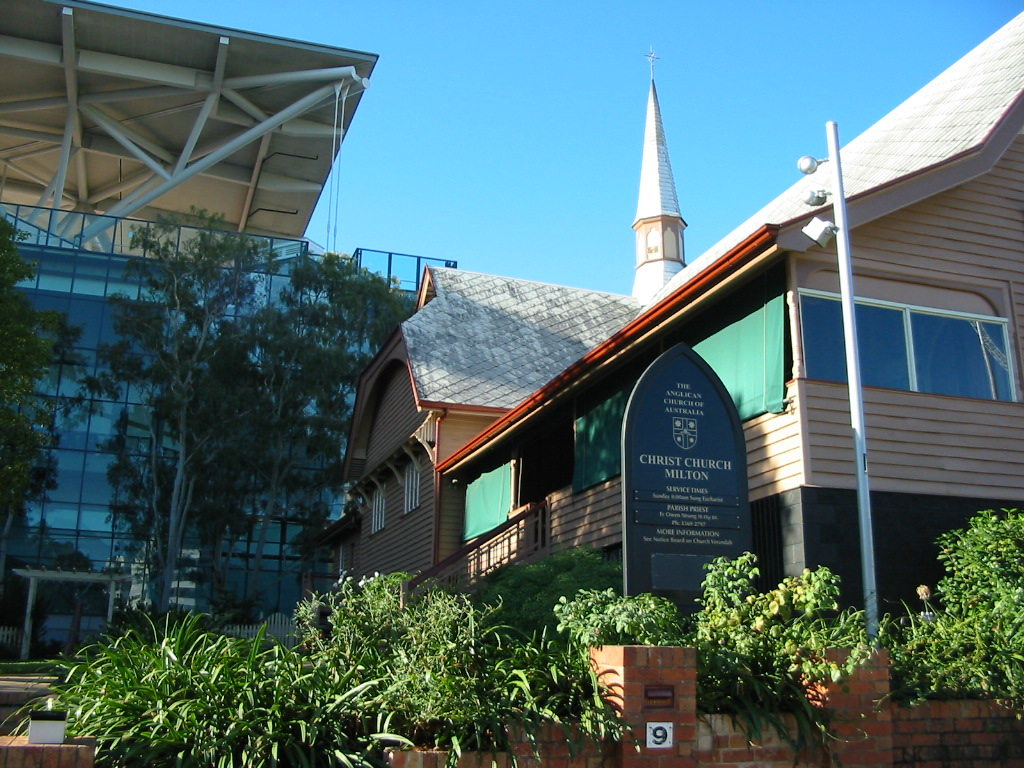
Christ Church, Milton with Suncorp Stadium in the background, 2005

Situated at the corner of Hale and Chippendall Streets, Christ Church and its spire are still a visible and distinctive presence in the surrounding area, which is now occupied by light industry rather than residential buildings. However, the neighbouring Lang Park Stadium dominates the built environment. The church precinct is separated from the Hale Street diversion by a high retaining wall. An open garden area lies between the church and rectory and the memorial reserve is accessed from there by a gate set in a wall. The church grounds retain some mature trees.

The church is a timber building, set on a low base of concrete blocks. It is cruciform in plan with a slender spire over the crossing. The roof is clad with diamond shaped asbestos cement tiles and the pitch breaks to cover the verandahs on either side. There is a polygonal timber baptistery. The building displays to great advantage the beauty and utility of Queensland timber. The exterior is clad with painted weatherboard except for the outside walls to the verandahs which have exposed studs. Inside, the church is lined with unpainted vee-jointed pine boards which have deepened in colour with age. It has a crown post roof with scissor braces. The transepts contain a Lady Chapel and Warrior's Chapel and are separated from the nave by pointed arches.

The windows in the body of the church are casements with trefoil heads in moulded frames and are set with clear glass, but a group of seven above the altar are set with stained glass depicting Christ and the saints Paul, Mary, John, and Barnabas. The baptistery beyond an arch at the southern end of the building is lit by modern stained glass windows.

A number of fittings reused from the earlier church include a stone font given by Andrew Petrie in 1874 to the first chapel. There is a brass lectern donated as a memorial in 1892 and the pulpit dates from 1914. Pews in the choir and nave are carved and add to the rich timber colours of the interior. There is a timber Honour Board from World War I.

The small pipe organ by Whitehouse to the right of the chancel was extensively rebuilt and electrified in 1984.

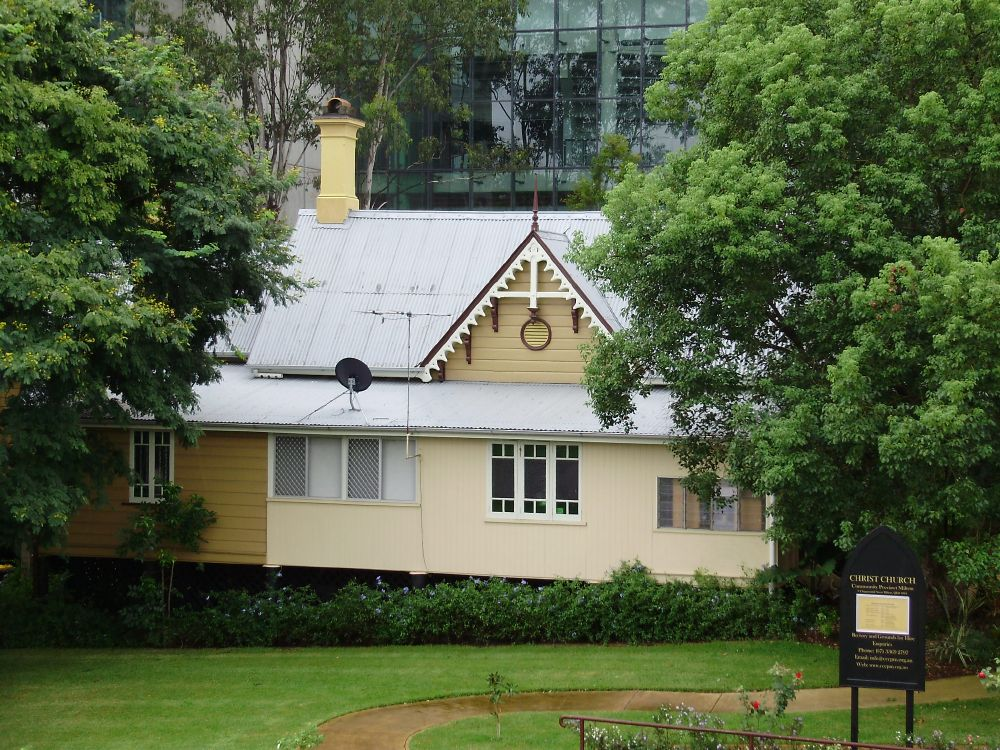
Rectory, with Suncorp Stadium in the background, 2009

The rectory is no longer used for this purpose, although the church uses several rooms on the enclosed verandah facing the street as offices. The body of the house is let as a residence. It is a single-storey timber house with a steeply pitched roof, clad in corrugated iron and decorated with fretted barge boards. It is on low stumps and has brick chimneys. A central hall opens into a dining and living rooms on the left and two bedrooms on the right. At the rear there is a kitchen wing containing scullery, maid's room and kitchen. The house has lath and plaster walls in the main internal rooms, an unusual feature in a comparatively modest home. The verandah has been enclosed and extended over time; however, the house is generally very intact and has well-detailed joinery. Details such as the arched timber front demonstrate the influence of the Gothic style.

The Memorial Reserve contains 21 memorials from the former Anglican burial reserve, a number of which commemorate members of well known pioneer families.

== Heritage listing ==
Christ Church was listed on the Queensland Heritage Register on 21 October 1992 having satisfied the following criteria.

The place is important in demonstrating the evolution or pattern of Queensland's history.

Christ Church Milton is important in demonstrating the evolution or pattern of Queensland's history, containing within its grounds a section of Brisbane's first public cemetery. Christ Church is closely associated with the development of Milton and Petrie Terrace as suburbs of Brisbane and as a "mother church" nurtured the development of several later parishes. The size and quality of the church building, intended originally as a Sunday School, demonstrates the importance given to religious education in nineteenth century Queensland.

The place demonstrates rare, uncommon or endangered aspects of Queensland's cultural heritage.

The timbers from the Esk Valley used in the construction of the church are of a size and quality that have become rare today. The positioning of the church, rectory and hall in close proximity to the graveyard is an uncommon characteristic in Queensland churches. The reserve and the graves and memorials it contains are the only visible evidence of Queensland's first major public cemetery.

The place is important in demonstrating the principal characteristics of a particular class of cultural places.

Christ Church Milton is important as a good example of a Sunday School hall and church combined; an option that a number of early parishes chose as an interim measure where financial resources were limited. The wide verandahs and open floor space are characteristic of a hall, yet the building also has ecclesiastical features such as a cruciform floor plan, a steeple/ventilator and a baptistery. The rectory is a good, intact example of a cottage ornee of its era, having a quality of design and finish unusual in a house of its modest scale. The memorials contained in the reserve demonstrate 19th century customs connected with burial and mourning.

The place is important because of its aesthetic significance.

Christ Church Milton has aesthetic significance for the quality of its design, exhibiting such features relating to the Arts and Crafts movement as a highly competent use of timber materials throughout, the broken pitch of the principal roof and the introduction of an elaborate roof form. The rectory has aesthetic significance as a well executed Gothic cottage ornee, a style perhaps thought particularly suitable for church house.

The place is important in demonstrating a high degree of creative or technical achievement at a particular period.

Christ Church Milton is important in demonstrating a high degree of creative and technical achievement at a particular period. The use of a variety of timbers and the treatment of the ceiling show a high degree of technical competence. The design is an imaginative solution to the problem of containing diverse uses in a single building and shows a considered response to climate through its use of wide verandahs and a ventilator incorporated into the steeple.

The place has a strong or special association with a particular community or cultural group for social, cultural or spiritual reasons.

It has social and spiritual associations with the congregation of the parish, some of whom made notable contributions to the wider community.

The place has a special association with the life or work of a particular person, group or organisation of importance in Queensland's history.

Christ Church has a special association with the life and work of the Diocesan Architect, J H Buckeridge, and Bishop William Webber, whose vision for the developing church in Queensland encompassed new buildings of substance and quality. It is associated with the work of Lars Anderson whose innovative methods contributed to the development of the Queensland timber industry particularly in the Brisbane Valley.
