= John H. Buckeridge =

English-born Australian architect

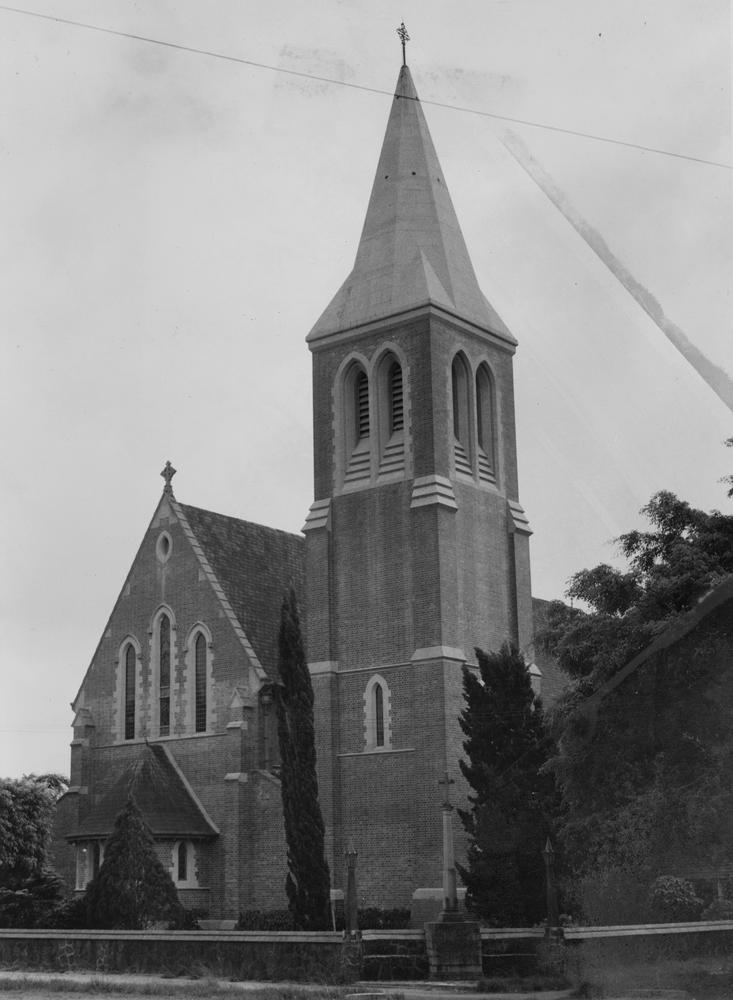
Christ Church, Bundaberg,

John H. Buckeridge (1857–1934) was an English-born Australian architect, who built about sixty churches in Queensland and is also remembered for remodelling the interior of the Macquarie era church of St James', King Street, Sydney.

== Life ==
John Hingeston Buckeridge was born 1857 in Oxford, England, the son of the architect, Charles Buckeridge, and his wife, Anne. He attended at Magdalen College, Oxford, and studied architecture under J. L. Pearson.

Buckeridge himself served in the Artists' Rifles from 1874 to 1878.

Buckeridge married Ada and had thirteen children, of whom his eldest son, Stanley, was killed at Lone Pine in World War I.

Buckeridge died on 25 June 1934 at his residence, 8 Garfield Street, Carlton, Sydney. He was privately cremated at Woronora crematorium on 26 June 1934.

== Architectural career ==
Buckeridge migrated to Australia in 1886. In 1887 he went to Queensland by invitation of William Webber, third Bishop of Brisbane, was appointed the Diocesan Architect for the Anglican Diocese of Brisbane and held that position until 1902. During that period he designed about sixty wooden churches for parishes in southern Queensland. Remaining examples include Christ Church, Milton, which was built as a temporary replacement for the earlier stone church, damaged in a storm of 1890. The small Arts and Crafts style building is still in use and has a heritage listing.

Of Buckeridge's domestic architecture, at least two examples remain, the rectory of St Mary's Anglican Church, Kangaroo Point and the former Rectory of St Andrew's Church, South Brisbane, designed in 1887 and extended by Buckeridge in 1892.

Buckeridge's more substantial churches include the stone church of St Luke's Anglican Church, Toowoomba. Christ Church Anglican Church, Bundaberg, was designed in the 1890s but not constructed until 1926. It is of dark brick, in the English Gothic style and has a tower and spire. Buckeridge also built the Quetta Memorial Church, now All Souls and St Bartholomew's Memorial Cathedral, on Thursday Island, in memory of the lives lost in the wreck of the RMS Quetta.

In 1892 Buckeridge commenced work in Sydney, remodelling the interior of St James' Church, King Street, removing the galleries, creating an apse and a raised platform for the choir. At this time he was also employed on work at Christ Church Cathedral, Newcastle. This building, one of the largest cathedrals in Australia, was designed by John Horbury Hunt and commenced in 1883. In 1902 Buckeridge introduced a number of structural details to support the roof. In 1907 Buckeridge became an architect with the New South Wales Department of Public Works, remaining in that position until his retirement.

== List of works ==
- 1887: former rectory of St Andrew's Anglican Church, South Brisbane, now relocated at 112 Airlie Road, Pullenvale
- 1888–1889: St Agnes Anglican Church, Esk
- 1889: Gresham Hotel, on the corner of Adelaide and Creek Streets, Brisbane
- 1889: Rectory at St Mary's Anglican Church, Kangaroo Point
- 1889–1890: Lady Bowen Hospital, Spring Hill
- 1890: Grandstands at the Eagle Farm Racecourse, Eagle Farm
- 1891: Christ Church, Milton
- 1891–1892: Holy Trinity Parish Hall, Fortitude Valley
- 1892: St Luke's Anglican Church, Toowoomba
- 1893–1893: All Souls and St Bartholomew's Cathedral Church, Thursday Island (known as the Quetta Memorial Church)
- 1899: Christ Church, Childers
- 1901: renovations to St James' Church, Sydney
- 1901: Memorial Church of St John the Evangelist, Mundoolun
- 1901–1902: rectory at St Agnes Anglican Church, Esk
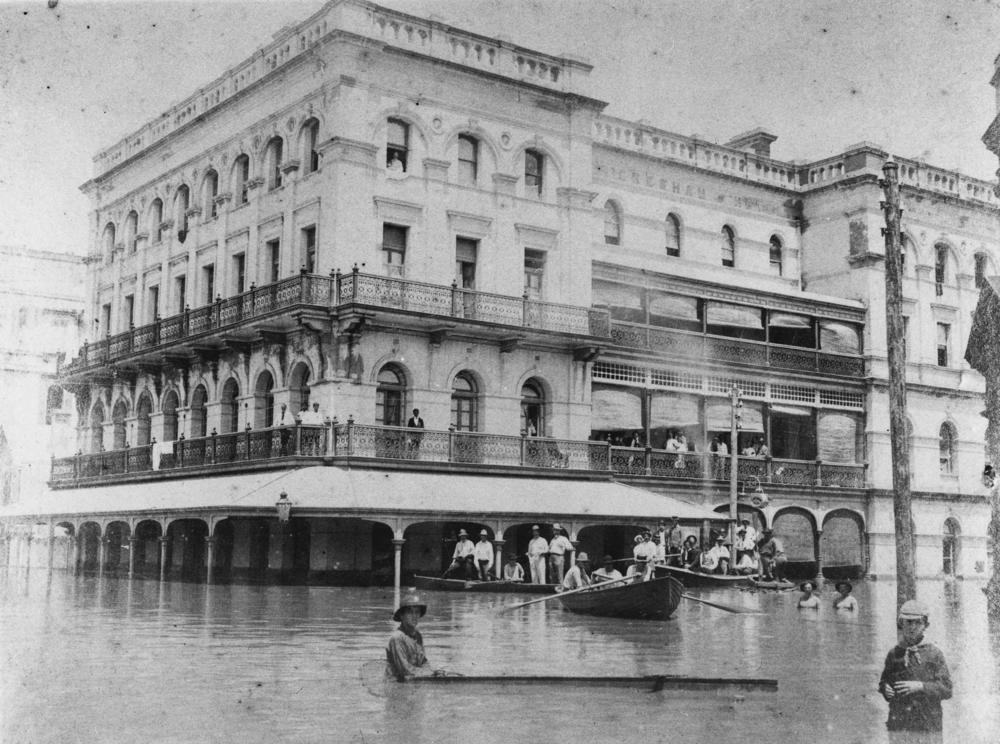
Gresham Hotel during the 1893 flood

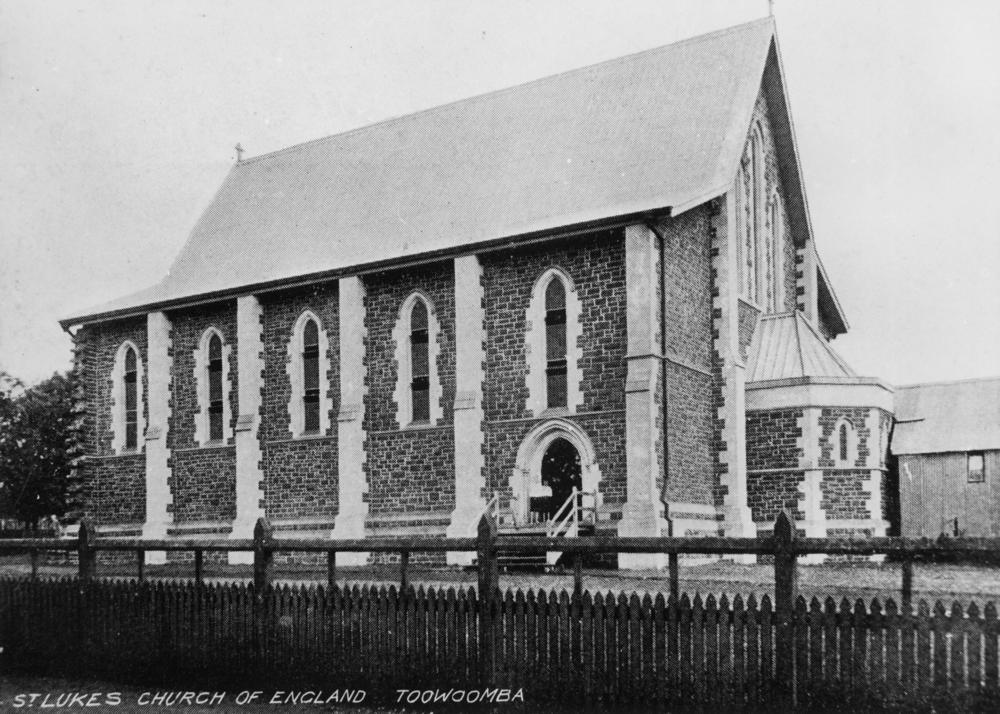
St Luke's Anglican Church, Toowoomba (1902)

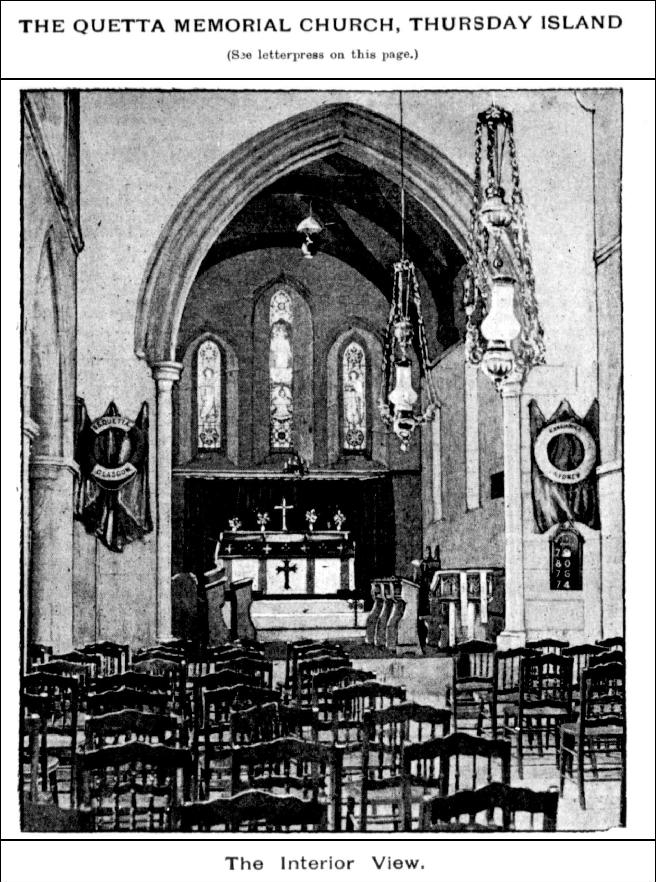
Interior of Quetta Memorial Church, Thursday Island

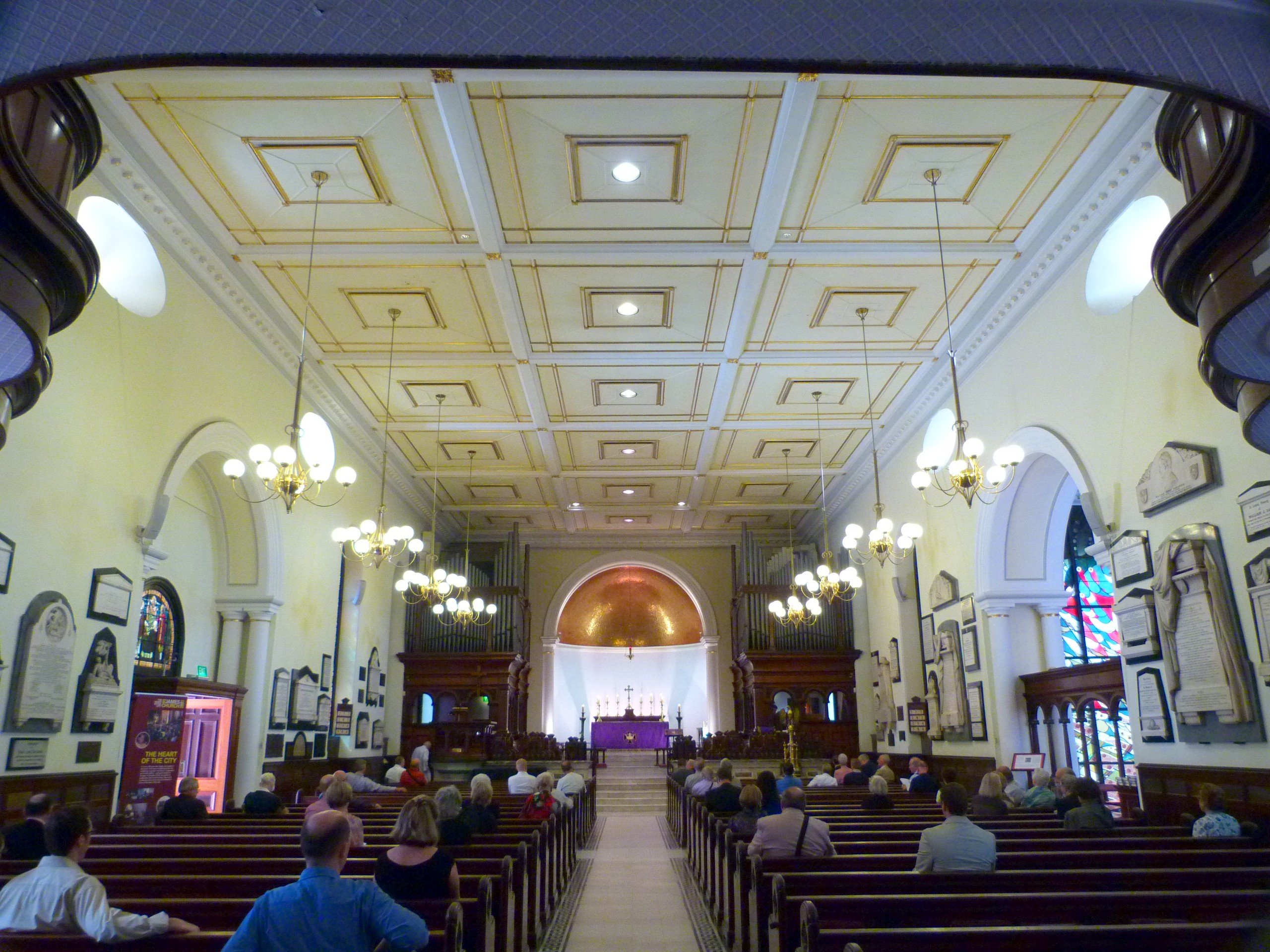
The interior of St James' Church, Sydney

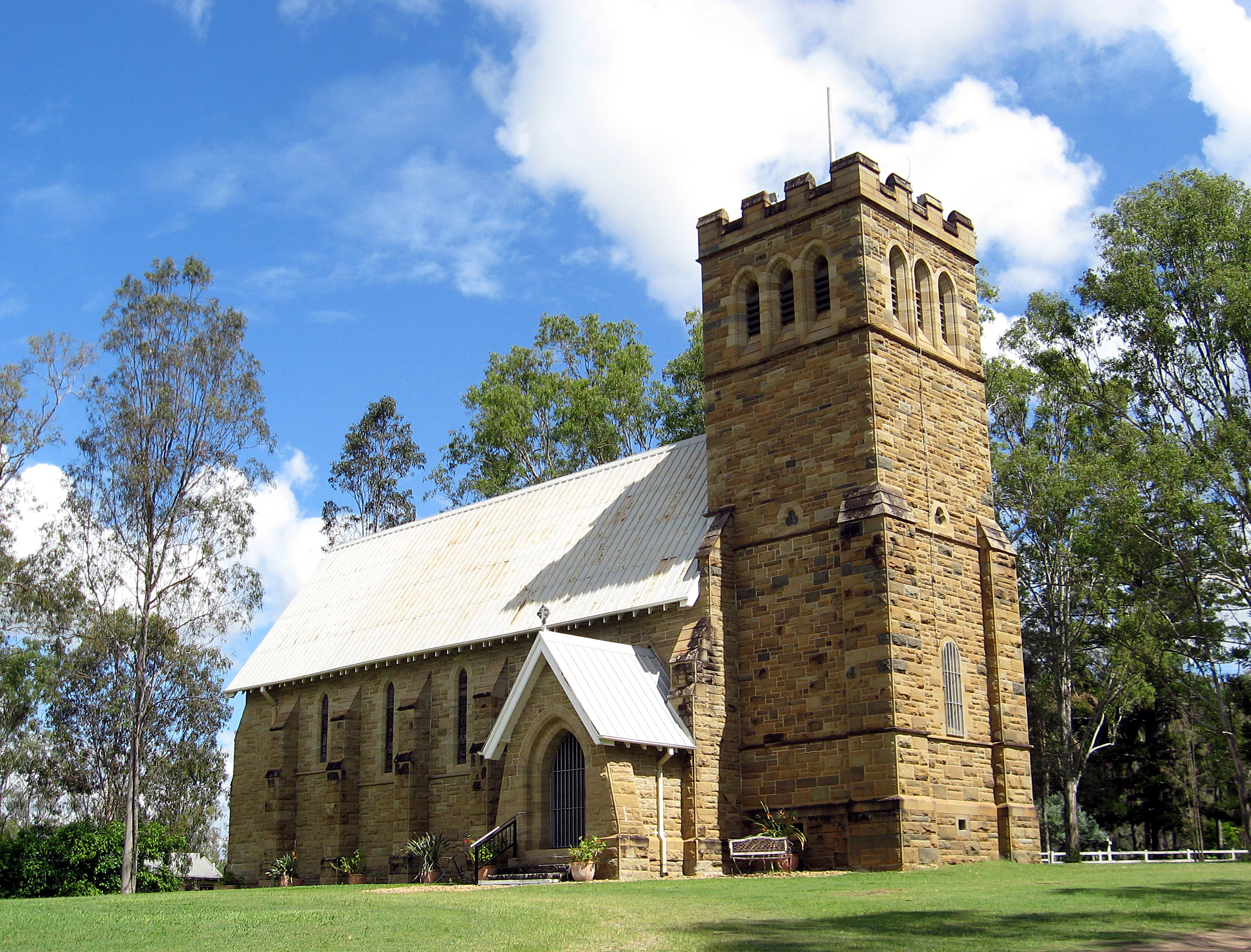
St John's Mundoolun Church, 2013

== Legacy ==
Drawings, plans, correspondence and photographs from Buckeridge are held in the Fryer Library, The University of Queensland.

== See also ==
- Architecture of Australia
- Francis Greenway
- Edmund Blacket
- John Horbury Hunt
