= St Agnes Anglican Church, Esk =

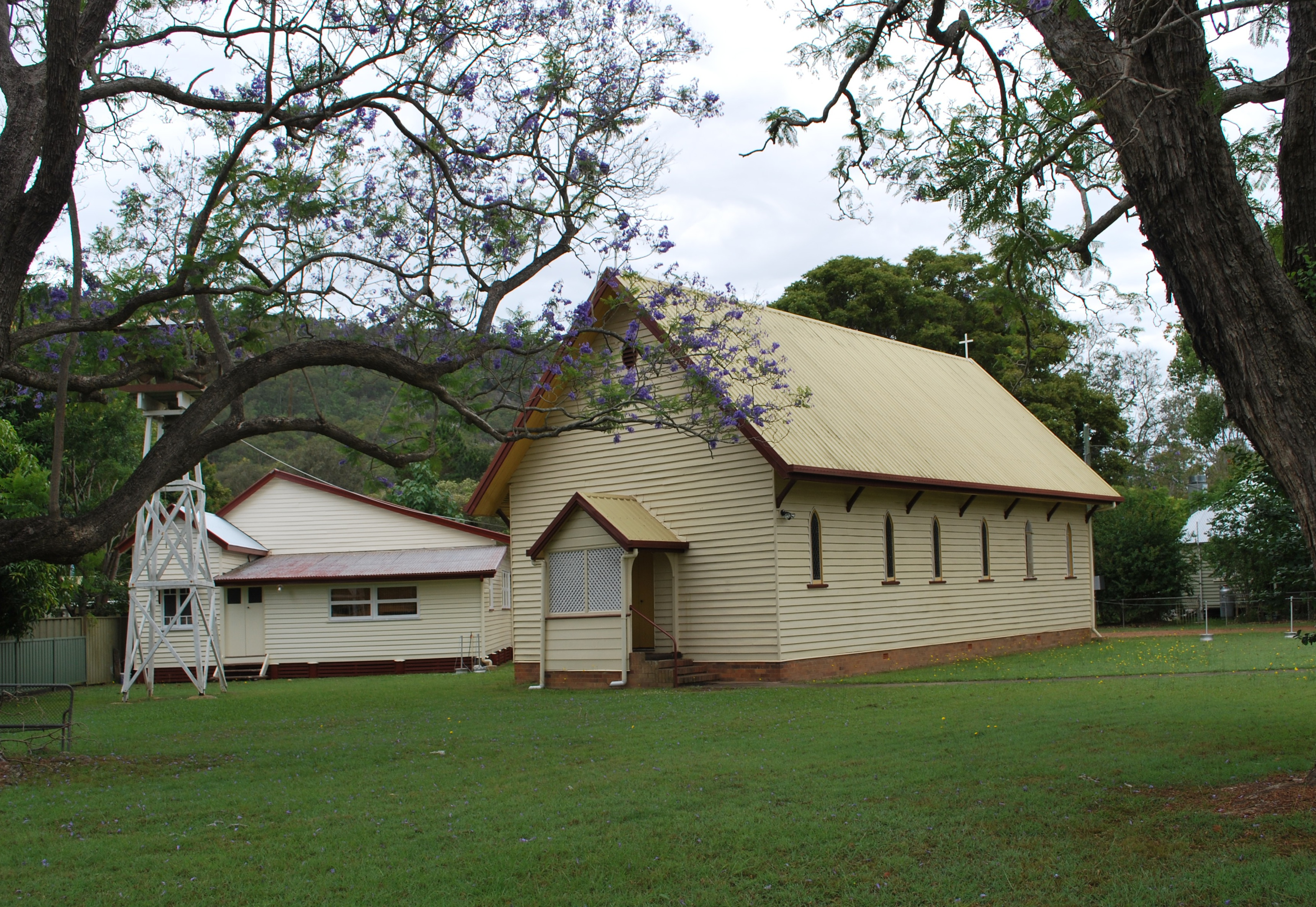
- Esk Anglican Rectory and Church, 2010

- Location within Queensland
- 27.2409°S 152.4227°E
- Location: Ipswich Street, Esk, Somerset Region, Queensland, Australia

History
- Design period: 1870s–1890s (late 19th century)
- Built: 1889–1953

Site notes
- Architect: John Hingeston Buckeridge

Queensland Heritage Register
- Official name: St Agnes Rectory and Church
- Type: state heritage (built)
- Designated: 21 October 1992
- Reference no.: 600493
- Significant period: 1889, 1901–1902, 1908–1910, 1920, 1953 (fabric)
- Significant components: stained glass window/s, memorial – gate/s, furniture/fittings, tower – bell / belfry, memorial – plaque, church, residential accommodation – rectory, trees/plantings
- Builders: Lars Andersen

St Agnes Anglican Church is a heritage-listed churchyard at Ipswich Street, Esk, Somerset Region, Queensland, Australia. It was designed by John Hingeston Buckeridge and built in 1889 by Lars Andersen. It is also known as St Agnes Rectory and Church Hall. It was added to the Queensland Heritage Register on 21 October 1992.

== History ==
The timber church, rectory and church hall which comprise the St Agnes group at Esk, were erected between 1889 and 1910.

The Anglican Parish of Esk had been created in 1886. For the first few years, services at Esk were conducted at the non-denominational Union Church. The present site, intended for a church, hall and rectory, was donated by Ellen Webb, and transferred to the Anglican Church in 1889. Plans for the church were prepared in late 1888 by Brisbane diocesan architect John Hingeston Buckeridge, with working drawings following in 1889. Limited funds produced some alteration to the design. The building was erected in mid-1889 by local Esk contractor, sawmill proprietor and Anglican parishioner, Lars Andersen, and was dedicated on Monday 28 October 1889 by Bishop William Webber.

In 1907 the western end of the building was lengthened by 3 metres (9.8 ft), the communion rails were extended, and a vestry was added.

The rectory was constructed in 1901–1902, and had been paid for by November 1902. It also was designed by Buckeridge, and included a parish room (meeting room). Since 1928, when the Esk and Toogoolawah parishes re-combined to form the Brisbane Valley parish, the rector has resided at Toogoolawah, and St Agnes rectory has been rented. Currently it is leased to a local art and craft society.

The church and rectory were two of approximately ninety Anglican buildings erected during the episcopate of the Anglican Bishop of Brisbane William Webber, from 1885 to 1903. Webber had an understanding of ecclesiastical design and architecture generally and was responsible for bringing Buckeridge to Brisbane from London, appointing him as Diocesan Architect in 1887.

The church hall began as a smaller Sunday School building, constructed c. 1902. It was extended as a hall between 1908 and 1910, and has been modified since. This building does not form part of the heritage listing.

In 1903 shade trees were planted in the grounds, some of which remain.

The street entrance pillars were erected in honour of former parishioner and Brisbane Valley pioneer Francis Edward Bigge. They were designed and built by stonemason Andrew Petrie of Toowong in 1920.

The bell and belltower were erected in 1953.

== Description ==
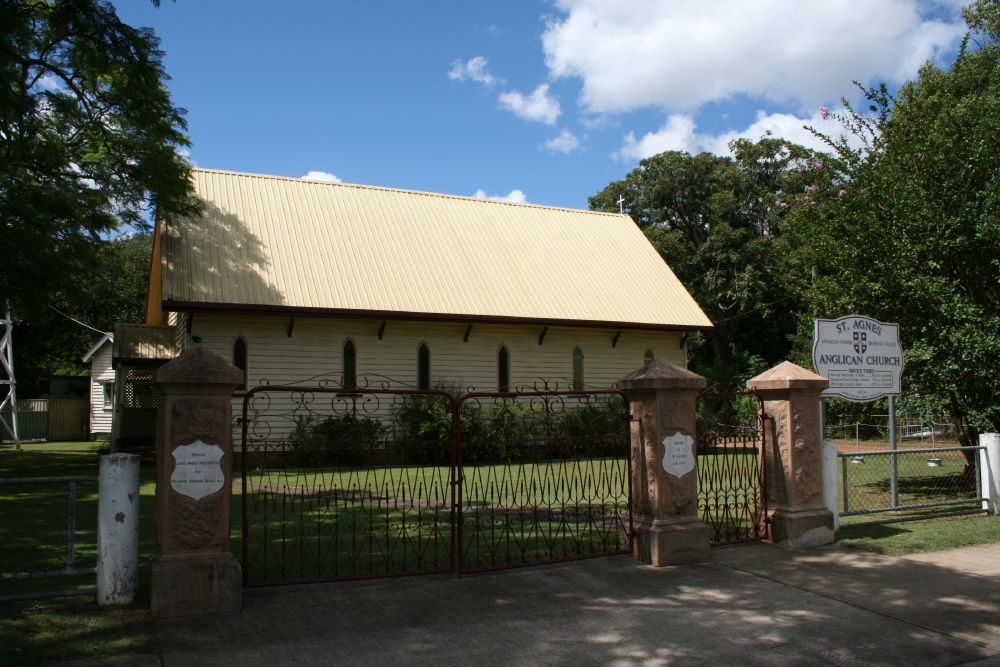
St Agnes Church, showing entry gates, 2008

St Agnes rectory and church, located with a hall, belltower and grounds containing a number of mature trees, form an Anglican church group which, along with the Presbyterian, Uniting and Catholic Church groups, is situated on Ipswich Street, the main road into Esk.

=== Church ===
St Agnes church is a weatherboard building with a steeply pitched ribbed metal gable roof with deep timber brackets to the eaves. The building has a rectangular plan set on a later brick base, with a vestry added to the east and a porch to the north west.

The entry porch has a gable roof with weatherboard balustrade and gable. The entry and vestry doors have convex quarter circles at the top corners.

The building features lancet windows, most of which contain leadlight glazing except in the sanctuary which features stained glass. The building has a scissor trussed roof with boarded ceiling and vertical tongue and groove boards to the walls of the nave. The sanctuary has horizontal boards to the walls and the interior surfaces have been painted.

A timber screen separates the sanctuary from the nave. This screen has a tongue and groove balustrade and decorative timber brackets forming a pointed arch in the centre. A timber cross is supported above the centre and a pulpit is built into the western end of the nave.

The internal faces of the doors have decorative diagonal boarding at close centres. The floor of the sanctuary and altar are raised above the nave and vestry, and at cornice level there are spaced ventilation boards. The altar and altar rail are of stained carved timber and the building contains original pews, a stone baptismal font and memorial plaques.

A 1953 timber-frame belltower with a corrugated iron pitched roof is located to the north east of the church. Entry to the site is via memorial gates which consist of three sandstone gateposts with decorative metal gates. The posts are square in plan with pyramid capitals, rock finish faces with dressed corners and base and a marble plaque and name badge on the two centre posts. The grounds include a number of notable mature trees.

=== Rectory ===
St Agnes rectory is a single-storeyed weatherboard building with a corrugated iron hipped gable roof. It has timber stumps, with verandahs on the north and east sides. The street entrance porch has a projecting gable to the verandah with decorative timber truss, finial and barge boards. The verandah roof is at a lesser pitch to the main roof and the hipped gables have curved timber bargeboards.

The verandah features decorative timber brackets and posts and the walls are single-skin with exposed timber framing. The front door has timber panelling with glass sidelights and fanlight. French doors with fanlights open onto the verandah.

The double hung sash windows have sunhoods with curved timber brackets and a carport has been added to the south, the roof of which cuts across a side window. The building has a brick chimney and a rear verandah has been enclosed with chamferboards and casement windows.

Internally, the joinery is intact and the building has boarded walls and ceiling. A detached laundry is located at the rear.

== Heritage listing ==
St Agnes Church and rectory were listed on the Queensland Heritage Register on 21 October 1992 having satisfied the following criteria.

The place is important in demonstrating the evolution or pattern of Queensland's history.

St Agnes Church and rectory are important in demonstrating the pattern of Queensland's history, being associated with the consolidation of the Anglican church in Esk.

The place demonstrates rare, uncommon or endangered aspects of Queensland's cultural heritage.

They demonstrate an uncommon aspect of Queensland's cultural heritage, comprising as they do the only known group of buildings in Queensland which contains both a church and rectory designed by diocesan architect JH Buckeridge, and are important in illustrating the principal characteristics of their type.

The place is important in demonstrating the principal characteristics of a particular class of cultural places.

They demonstrate an uncommon aspect of Queensland's cultural heritage, comprising as they do the only known group of buildings in Queensland which contains both a church and rectory designed by diocesan architect JH Buckeridge, and are important in illustrating the principal characteristics of their type.

The place is important because of its aesthetic significance.

The place is important in exhibiting a number of aesthetic characteristics valued by the local community, including the intactness of the federation-era rectory, and the contribution, through scale, form and materials, of the buildings and grounds to the streetscape of Ipswich Street and to the Esk townscape.

The place has a strong or special association with a particular community or cultural group for social, cultural or spiritual reasons.

The place has had a special association with the Anglican community in Esk as a centre of local worship, for over a century.

The place has a special association with the life or work of a particular person, group or organisation of importance in Queensland's history.

The church and rectory have a strong association with architect JH Buckeridge, being examples of his ecclesiastical work in Queensland.
