= St John's Anglican Church, Dalby =

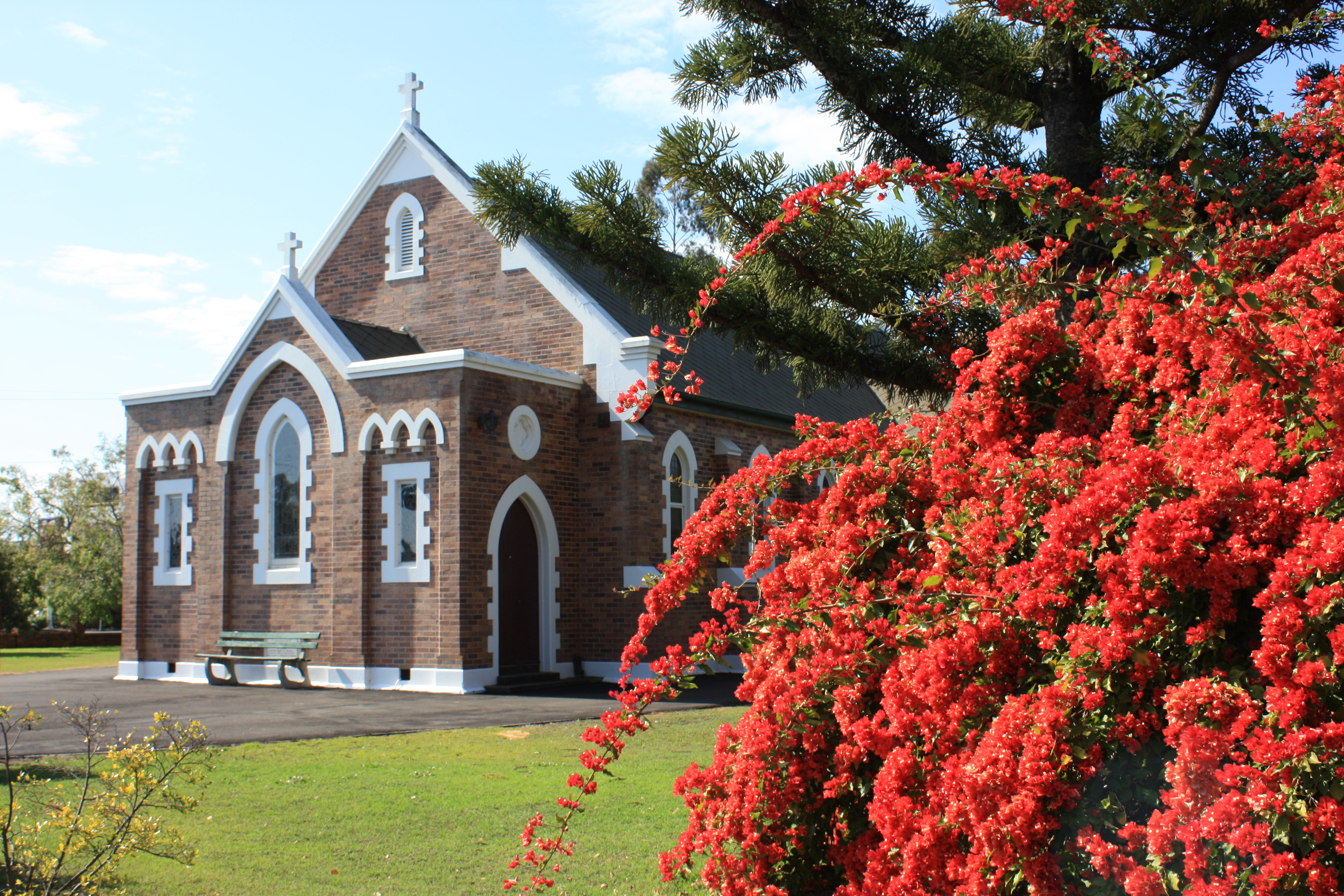
- St John's Anglican Church, Dalby, 2010

- Location within Queensland
- 27.1841°S 151.2633°E
- Location: 153 Cunningham Street, Dalby, Western Downs Region, Queensland, Australia

History
- Design period: 1919–1930s (interwar period)
- Built: 1920s

Site notes
- Architect: Henry James (Harry) Marks
- Architectural style: Gothic

Queensland Heritage Register
- Official name: St John's Anglican Church, St John's Church of England
- Type: state heritage (built)
- Designated: 14 August 2008
- Reference no.: 602399
- Significant period: 1920s
- Significant components: font – baptismal, baptistry, memorial – window, vestry, stained glass window/s, church

St John's Anglican Church is a heritage-listed church at 153 Cunningham Street, Dalby, Western Downs Region, Queensland, Australia. It is the third church of that name on the site and was designed by Henry James (Harry) Marks and built in the 1920s. It is also known as St John's Church of England. It was added to the Queensland Heritage Register on 14 August 2008.

== History ==
St John's Church, Dalby is a brick church constructed in 1922–1923 to the design of Harry Marks and is the third church of this name on the site. The previous timber church, built in 1876, remained on the site in a modified form as part of a former parish hall, until it was demolished in February 2003.

The site of St John's Church is part of a continuing tradition of Anglican worship established during the first years of European settlement on the Darling Downs, which began in 1840. At this time (prior to the separation of Queensland) the Darling Downs were part of New South Wales and fell within the Diocese of Newcastle. The Reverend John Gregor visited the area, holding services in camps and private homes from 1840 until his death in 1848. The energetic Reverend Benjamin Glennie succeeded him and his first service on the Downs was held in the parlour of the Bull's Head Inn at Drayton in 1848, there being no church. On 25 May 1851, Glennie held the first service in the Dalby area in the home of Hugh Ross. From then on, regular services were held in such diverse venues as private homes, a woolshed and the courthouse. Glennie was responsible for the Anglican pastoral care of the Darling Downs from 1850 to 1860. He laid the foundations of a parochial system on the Downs by establishing congregations, buying strategic sites and building churches.

Glennie approached his bishop William Tyrrell for permission to buy land for a church in Toowoomba and in February 1853 gained permission to collect subscriptions for buildings in other towns on his tours throughout his parish, state aid for the construction of church buildings having ceased in 1852. He envisioned four churches, each dedicated to one of the evangelists, in the four major towns of the Downs. This vision was eventually fulfilled by St Luke's at Toowoomba (1856), St Mark's at Warwick (1857), St Matthew's at Drayton (1859) and St John's at Dalby (1866).

The town of Dalby developed on the site of a crossing over Myall Creek, a tributary of the Condamine River. Here Henry Dennis, seeking grazing land for his employer, Charles Coxen, camped in 1841 soon after the first land was taken up on the Darling Downs. A small settlement grew up around "the Crossing" and became a recognised township in 1854. In 1863 Dalby was proclaimed a municipality, the Borough of Dalby, and developed as the main centre of the northern Downs. The Western railway line reached Dalby in 1868 and it grew in importance as the railhead for the surrounding pastoral and agricultural industries.

In June 1858, Glennie wrote to his Bishop asking him to secure a piece of land at Dalby for a church. In 1859, the government granted a two-acre block of land at the corner of Cunningham and Drayton streets for a church, school and parsonage. In 1860 the first parish priest, Reverend Edmund Moberley, was appointed and in 1863 a parsonage was built in Patrick Street where 27 acres (11 hectares) of Glebe land were also held. In 1866 a small brick church with an iron roof was built on the corner of Cunningham and Drayton Streets to the design of WC Wakeling. Due to insufficient funds, it was built to only half the size originally intended and in 1874 developed cracks due to movement of the foundations, which proved inadequate for the soil conditions. It soon became unsafe and it was decided to replace it with a timber church rather than undertake repairs.

The next church was designed by architect Willoughby Powell, opened on 5 November 1876 by Bishop Matthew Hale and consecrated in 1878. The church, a rectangular timber building sheltered by a shingled roof and set on stumps, faced Cunningham Street.

In the early 1920s, during a period of economic expansion in Queensland, the congregation decided to replace this church with a brick building and the foundation stone for the third church on this site was laid in August 1922. The 1876 church was moved and extensively modified to serve as a parish hall and Sunday school. Furniture, fittings, stained glass and ornaments were transferred to the new church. Stained glass windows taken from the 1876 church and installed in the 1922 church include one now in the baptistery depicting St Cecilia (donated in 1901 in memory of Mrs Geizel) and the Mulholland Memorial window, a representation of the Transfiguration, now at the east end of the church. Both were to the design of EA Milford, a prominent Sydney churchman.

The new church was designed by architect HJ (Harry) Marks. He was one of a remarkable family firm of architects that had a lasting effect on the appearance of Toowoomba, being responsible for a large number of public, private and commercial buildings. James Marks arrived in Queensland in 1866 and first set up in practice in Dalby, moving to Toowoomba in 1874. He entered into partnership as James Marks and Son with his eldest son Harry, who joined his father's practice in 1903, and Reginald who joined in 1910. Charles Marks, James' grandson, also worked as an architect in Toowoomba. Harry Marks was particularly interested in providing good ventilation and natural lighting and these are features of buildings designed by him.

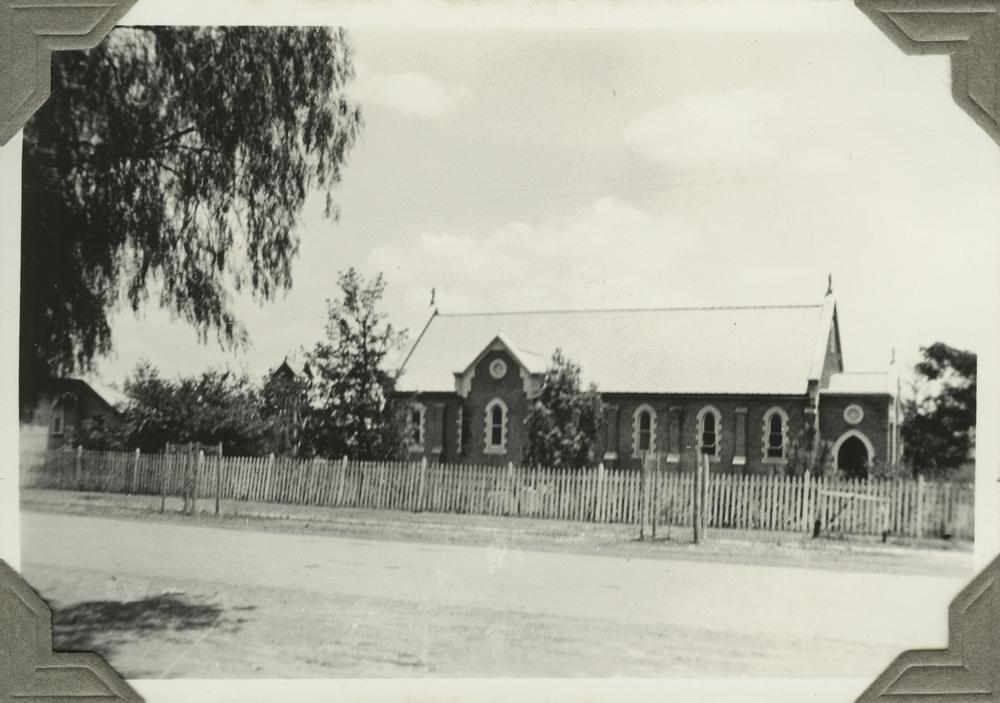
St John's Church of England, circa 1935

In order to prevent a recurrence of the foundation problems that ruined the first church, the Dalby site was excavated to a depth of 8 feet (2.4 m) when a bed of solid yellow clay was discovered. The foundations were put in with reinforced concrete built on arches. The building contract was let to J and F Muller of Toowoomba at an estimated cost of £4123. Memorial windows (Geizel and Mulholland windows), pulpit, altar and lectern and much of the furniture were transferred from the old building to the new one. The building of the church was funded from a building fund formed by gifts of money and land by Mr Osborne, to whose memory a stained glass window is installed in the sanctuary. Other gifts included a silver communion plate (Mr and Mrs Drury), candlesticks (Cecil Plains parish) and a sanctuary lamp (Mr and Mrs Fortescue - in memory of their son, killed in World War I). The foundation stone was laid in August 1922 by the Australian Governor-General, Baron Forster of Lepe, and Archbishop Gerald Sharp dedicated the new church on 19 August 1923. Decorative red cedar panelling donated by Mr CG Knowles was installed to dado height in the sanctuary and chancel by 1931. The church was consecrated on 11 August 1935 by Archbishop William Wand.

The Frank Knight Memorial Hall is a brick extension constructed in the 1960s to provide more seating for congregations and a parish hall. The northwest end of the hall accommodates a rectangular room with seating. Part of the south wall of the church, from the vestry to the east wall, was removed to connect this wing directly with the church.

Recent work to the church includes the installation of six split-system air conditioning units in January 2005 and the installation of four new stained glass windows in April 2008.

== Description ==
Geographically, the building is aligned on a northwest-southeast axis but this description treats this axis as the west-east liturgical axis, e.g. the northwest elevation is regarded as the west for liturgical purposes.

St John's Church stands prominently to the corner of Cunningham and Drayton Streets, Dalby and is set within extensive grounds. An elegant composition in the Gothic revival idiom, the building is sheltered by a steeply pitched roof clad with fibrous cement shingles and the buttresses and external walls are of brown facebrick embellished with white cement copings and mouldings.

Cruciform in plan, the transept accommodates a clergy vestry and a choir vestry and the west end a baptistery flanked by entrance porches. The nave is lit by lancet windows five of stained glass and one of coloured glass to the north and two of stained glass and two of coloured glass to the south. Both vestries are lit by lancet windows of coloured glass. Circular lights are over the external entrances to the vestries and oval lights decorate the internal doorways from these spaces the light over the south entrance now without its coloured glass. Internally, these windows are embellished with plain hood moulds. The east end accommodates the Mulholland memorial window, a fine stained glass window comprising three vertical arched panels crowned with three diamond-shaped lights depicting the Transfiguration. The Geizel memorial window, depicting St Cecilia, lights the baptistery.

The nave walls are plastered down to dado height beneath which is red face brick. The ceiling is lined with battened fibrous cement sheeting with a narrow decorative panel running along the underside of the ridge. Large curved timber brackets spring from oversized corbels to support the roof beams.

The altar, with decorative timber panelling to the sides, stands on a raised platform within the chancel which is lined to dado height with decorative cedar panelling. The church accommodates fine furniture including cedar pews and pulpit from the 1876 church, chairs, kneelers and lecterns. Other liturgical items include a silver communion plate, candlesticks, sanctuary lamp and processional cross.

A wing accommodating more seating opens to the south from the sanctuary. This is part of the Frank Knight Memorial Hall, a rectangular brick extension to the south of the church. This extension is not of cultural heritage significance.

The shrubs, trees, rectory, parish office and bell tower within the church grounds are not of cultural heritage significance. The property is bounded to Drayton and Cunningham streets by a low brick fence with decorative metal entrance gates. These elements are not of cultural heritage significance.

== Heritage listing ==
St John's Anglican Church was listed on the Queensland Heritage Register on 14 August 2008 having satisfied the following criteria.

The place is important in demonstrating the evolution or pattern of Queensland's history.

The site of St John's Anglican Church is important for its association with the early development of Dalby and of the Anglican Church in Queensland, being associated with a group of four early Anglican parishes established on the Darling Downs during the 1850s and 1860s and dedicated to the evangelists - St Matthew's at Drayton, St Mark's at Warwick, St Luke's at Toowoomba and St John's at Dalby. Important as part of a continuing tradition of Anglican worship on the Darling Downs, St John's Church (1922–1923) is the third church building for the parish of St John on this site.

The place is important in demonstrating the principal characteristics of a particular class of cultural places.

St John's Church is a fine example of a church in the Gothic revival idiom comprising a number of elements typical of this style including a steeply pitched roof, pointed arches, external buttressing to walls, decorative mouldings, lancet windows and fine stained glass.

A number of fixtures and fittings gifted to the church from parishioners reflect the importance of the church to the parish including memorial stained glass windows, church furniture and liturgical items.

Designed by leading Toowoomba architect Harry Marks, one of a family of prominent Queensland architects, St John's Church is a fine example of his ecclesiastical work.

The place is important because of its aesthetic significance.

Sited prominently in an open grassed setting on a corner in the heart of Dalby, the elegant, well-composed St John's Church, with its steeply pitched roof, fine brickwork and decorative embellishments, is a striking presence in the streetscape of Dalby. With fine stained glass windows, well-crafted furniture, decorative timber panelling and handsome timber roof brackets, the interior of the church provides a contemplative setting for religious observances.

== See also ==
- St Matthew's at Drayton
- St Mark's at Warwick
- St Luke's at Toowoomba
