= St Matthew's Anglican Church, Drayton =

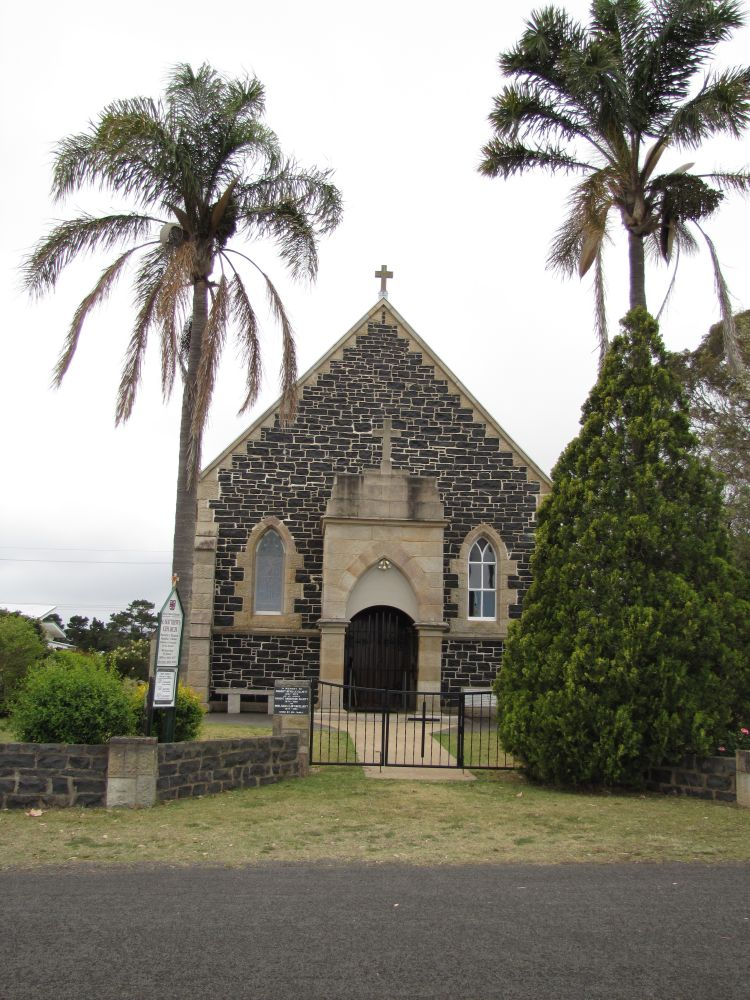
- St Matthew's Anglican Church, 2012

- Location within Queensland
- 27.5986°S 151.9118°E
- Location: Beatrice Street, Drayton, Toowoomba Region, Queensland, Australia

History
- Design period: 1870s–1890s (late 19th century)
- Built: 1886–1887

Site notes
- Architect: James Marks

Queensland Heritage Register
- Official name: St Matthews Church of England
- Type: state heritage (built, landscape)
- Designated: 21 October 1992
- Reference no.: 600837
- Significant period: 1880s, 1980s (historical); 1880s, 1930s, 1980s (fabric church); 1910s (fabric hall); 1900s (fabric)
- Significant components: church, residential accommodation – rectory, wall/s – garden, trees/plantings, views to, stained glass window/s, church hall/sunday school hall, tower – bell / belfry
- Builders: Seath, Hobart and Watson

St Matthew's Anglican Church is a heritage-listed church at Beatrice Street, Drayton, once a town but now a suburb of Toowoomba in Toowoomba Region, Queensland, Australia. It was designed by James Marks and built from 1886 to 1887 by Seath, Hobart and Watson. It is also known as St Matthew's Church of England and is the second church of that name in Drayton. It was added to the Queensland Heritage Register on 21 October 1992.

== History ==
St Matthew's Church of England is a small bluestone church constructed in 1886–7 to the design of James Marks and is the second church of this name in Drayton. It is complemented by a timber hall built in 1913 and a rectory built in 1902–1903, both of which were moved to this site in 1930.

The site is part of a continuing tradition of Anglican worship established during the first years of European settlement on the Darling Downs. Initially the Downs were part of New South Wales and fell within the Diocese of Newcastle. The Reverend John Gregor visited the area, holding services in camps and private homes from 1840 until his death in 1848. The energetic Reverend Benjamin Glennie succeeded him and in 1850 was appointed the first Incumbent for the Darling Downs, having previously made yearly trips to the area. His first service on the Darling Downs was held in the parlour of the Royal Bull's Head Inn at Drayton in 1848, there being no church on the Darling Downs. In 1850, Glennie arranged for a parsonage to be constructed on land he had purchased on what is now Rudd Street. Glennie also used the parsonage for church services. By this time, the focal point of activity on the Downs was swinging some six kilometres northwards to an area known as "The Swamp", later to become Toowoomba. Glennie approached his Bishop for permission to buy land for a church there. He envisioned four churches, each dedicated to one of the evangelists, in the four major towns of the Downs. This he eventually accomplished with St Luke's, Toowoomba (1856), St Mark's, Warwick (1857), St Matthew's, Drayton (1859) and St John's, Dalby (1866).

The first St Matthew's church constructed at Drayton was a simple slab building, the erection of a church proper being delayed by the cessation in 1852 of state aid for the construction of church buildings. In February 1853 Glennie sought permission to collect subscriptions for buildings at Drayton, Warwick, Dalby and Toowoomba on his tours throughout his parish. In April 1856 two acres of land north of the parsonage were acquired and the first service was held in the new church on 23 January 1859. The building was denounced by the Brisbane Courier as "neither pretty nor an ornament to the town" and the congregation was criticised for failing to support the building of a better quality church. Nevertheless, it served as a place of worship for many years being enlarged in the late 1860s.

By 1884 the church had again become too small and it was agreed to build a new one. On the advice of the architect, James Marks, a hilltop site with better conditions for the foundations was acquired for the new church. After considering costs in several different materials, it was decided to build a stone church and the tender for £850 by builders Seath, Hobart and Watson was accepted on 26 March 1886. The foundation stone was laid on Monday 16 August 1886 by Bishop William Webber in company with the Hon William Henry Groom, Mayor of Toowoomba and Rev. J. McCleverty, incumbent of Drayton at the time.

The architect for the new church was locally based and the founder of a remarkable family firm of architects which had a lasting effect on the appearance of Toowoomba, being responsible for a large number of public, private and commercial buildings. James Marks arrived in Queensland in 1866 and first set up in practice in Dalby, moving to Toowoomba in 1874. He entered into partnership as James Marks and Son with his eldest son Harry, who joined his father's practice in 1903, and was to later work on the rectory, and Reginald who joined in 1910. Charles Marks, James' grandson, also worked as an architect in Toowoomba.

In order to reduce costs as much as possible, the church was built with a timber chancel and was dedicated on 22 December 1887. The original bell had been replaced in 1880 with a larger and heavier one purchased from Brisbane for £18 and in August 1889 it was suggested that the belfry should be removed and the bell placed on the porch of the new church, to which a sandstone bell turret was added. By 1892 this and a temporary vestry were completed.

The original church was used as a Sunday school and in 1901 was taken down, moved slightly and rebuilt, the shingles being replaced by corrugated iron. In 1903 a new rectory was built opposite the original church site to the design of William Hodgen, another noted Toowoomba architect and founder of an architectural dynasty, who undertook work throughout southern and western Queensland.

By 1910 it was apparent that the weight of the turret and bell were causing structural damage to the porch of the church. To strengthen it, the north and south sides of the porch were closed in and the bell was removed to the present free-standing bell tower.

In 1913, a new Sunday School hall was built on the old site. It included flooring from the demolished former St Matthew's church and re-used its 1901 roofing.

Between 1923 and 1935 the Reverend Samuel Atherton was Rector at St Matthew's and was responsible for a series of major projects to improve and extend the church. In 1930 the rectory and hall were moved from the old site and relocated close to St Matthew's. In the process the rectory was made more convenient by relocating the previously detached kitchen, pantry and bathroom. Plans for this were drawn up by Harry Marks.

In 1933 extensive work was undertaken to remove the old timber sanctuary and replace it in bluestone as originally intended. Between 1933 and 1935 this was panelled and other works were carried out including the removal of the bell turret from the porch. Various items were donated to the church following its extension, including the door knocker from the Royal Bull's Head Inn at Drayton, which was placed on the vestry door. The two palms at the front of the church were planted on 20 April 1935 in memory of Mr and Mrs Searle. In spite of the severe financial strictures of the Depression, the work was paid for in full by May 1934, a remarkable achievement. The contribution made to the parish by Rev. Atherton is remembered in the name of the park opposite the church.

In 1986 repair work was undertaken for the centenary of the church including the replastering and painting of the interior. In 1987 the temporary timber vestry was replaced in masonry. Around the same time many parishioners took part in a working bee to refurbish the rectory, which had previously undergone extensive work in the 1950s and 1960s as an alternative to building new accommodation. Further work was carried out in 1995 and the house is no longer in use as a rectory. The timber hall remains and is in use. The site of the original church, on the corner of Cambooya and Rudd Streets, Drayton, is now marked by a cairn.

== Rectors ==
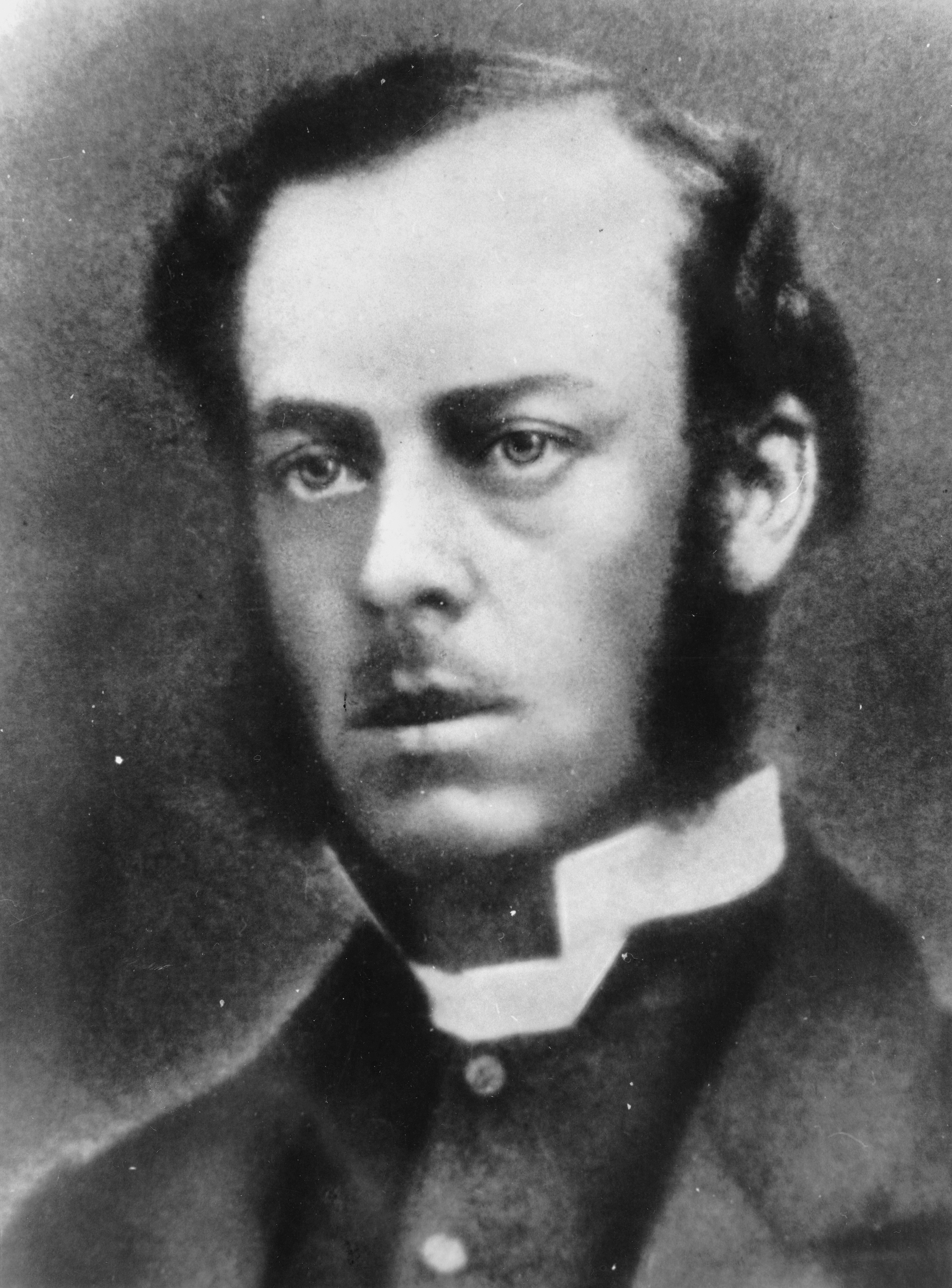
Vincent Ransome, 1860

Rectors of St Matthew's include:

- 1861–1863: Vincent Ransome, son-in-law of Drayton pioneer, Thomas Alford
- 1923–1935: Samuel Atherton

== Description ==
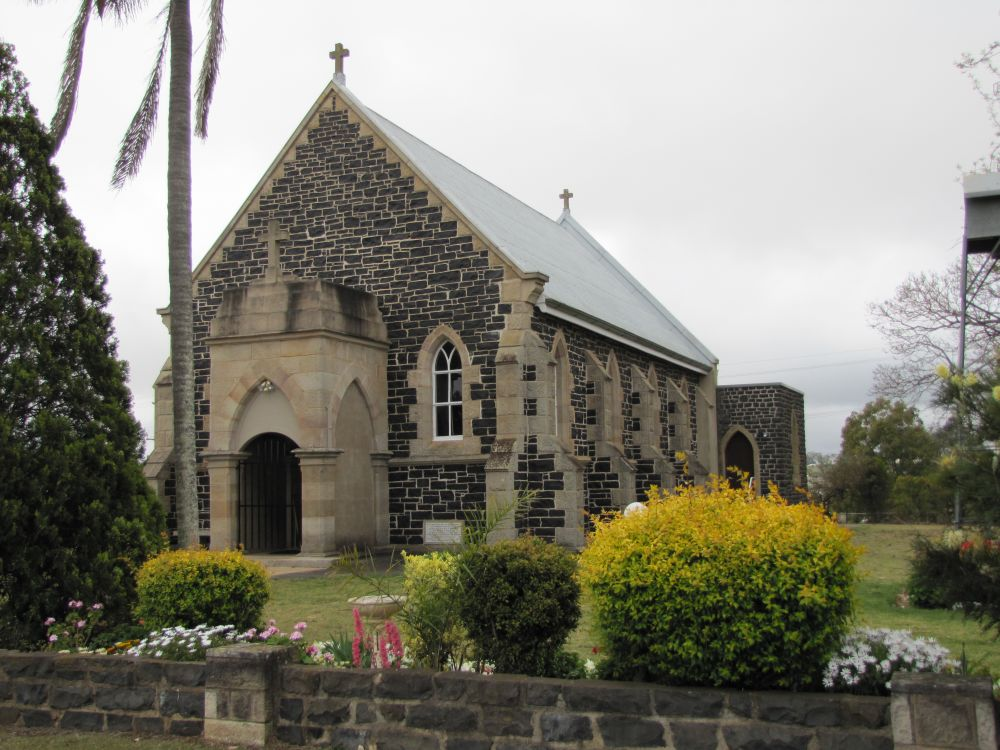
St Matthew's, 2012

St Matthew's Church is located on the highest ground in Drayton, the grounds also containing a free standing bell tower and timber Sunday School building.

It is a four bay stone church comprising nave, porch, sanctuary and vestry. It has a gabled roof clad in corrugated iron with gabled vents to the sanctuary roof. The walls are of hammer dressed square rubble bluestone laid in random courses. The vestry is built of basalt sandstone and has a flat roof concealed by a parapet. Facings to gable capping, buttresses, doors and windows are Murphy's Creek sandstone and there is an arched entry porch also in sandstone. This has a concrete floor and is reached by sandstone steps. Windows are lancets, some with decorated glass.

The interior is painted plaster and the nave has an open, timbered ceiling supported by king posts and hammer beams. The floors are timber and that in the sanctuary is raised above the level of the nave. The sanctuary has timber panelled walls and a segmental timber vault.

The church is surrounded by palm trees and a low wall has been constructed at the front in the same bluestone as the church walls.

The hall is to the north west and is a simple timber building with a gable roof clad in corrugated iron and a central gabled porch entry on the long axis. At the rear, a skillion roofed extension runs the length of the building. The windows are lancets and a triplet at the short axis has decorated glass.

The former rectory is set back from the corner of Cambooya and Glennie Streets and is a single-storey timber house on low stumps with a roof clad in corrugated iron. It is approached through a gabled porch and a small open verandah. A central hall opens onto bedrooms on the left and a drawing room with a corner fireplace on the right. At the rear of the house the hall opens onto a service area comprising laundry and study. There is also a kitchen wing at the rear that has a separate hipped roof suggesting that it may have been adapted from a detached kitchen. It contains a dining area, kitchen, pantry and bathroom. The verandah to Glennie Street has been built in as a sun room.

== Heritage listing ==
St Matthew's Church of England was listed on the Queensland Heritage Register on 21 October 1992 having satisfied the following criteria.

The place is important in demonstrating the evolution or pattern of Queensland's history.

St Matthew's is associated with the early development of Drayton and of the Anglican church in Queensland, being the oldest parish on the Darling Downs. It is the second church of this name in Drayton, replacing a timber slab church and illustrates the growth of the area. The Sunday school hall on site was built in 1913 and incorporates material from the original 1859 church. The rectory, originally built in 1902–3 reflects in its adaptations and additions the changing needs of generations of rectors.

The place demonstrates rare, uncommon or endangered aspects of Queensland's cultural heritage.

The stonework of St Matthew's is well constructed and the building is a rare example of a church built in the local bluestone.

The place is important because of its aesthetic significance.

The stonework of St Matthew's is well constructed and the building is a rare example of a church built in the local bluestone.

The place has a strong or special association with a particular community or cultural group for social, cultural or spiritual reasons.

The site has had strong links with the Anglican community of the parish for many years.

The place has a special association with the life or work of a particular person, group or organisation of importance in Queensland's history.

St Matthew's Church has strong associations with the life and work of James Marks, one of a family of prominent architects in Toowoomba. It is also an outcome of the work of the Reverend Benjamin Glennie, an important figure in history of Drayton/Toowoomba who laid the foundations for the development of the Church on the Darling Downs and with subsequent Rectors of the church, especially Rev. S. Atherton.

== See also ==
- St Mark's at Warwick
- St Luke's at Toowoomba
- St John's at Dalby
