= St Luke's Anglican Church, Toowoomba =

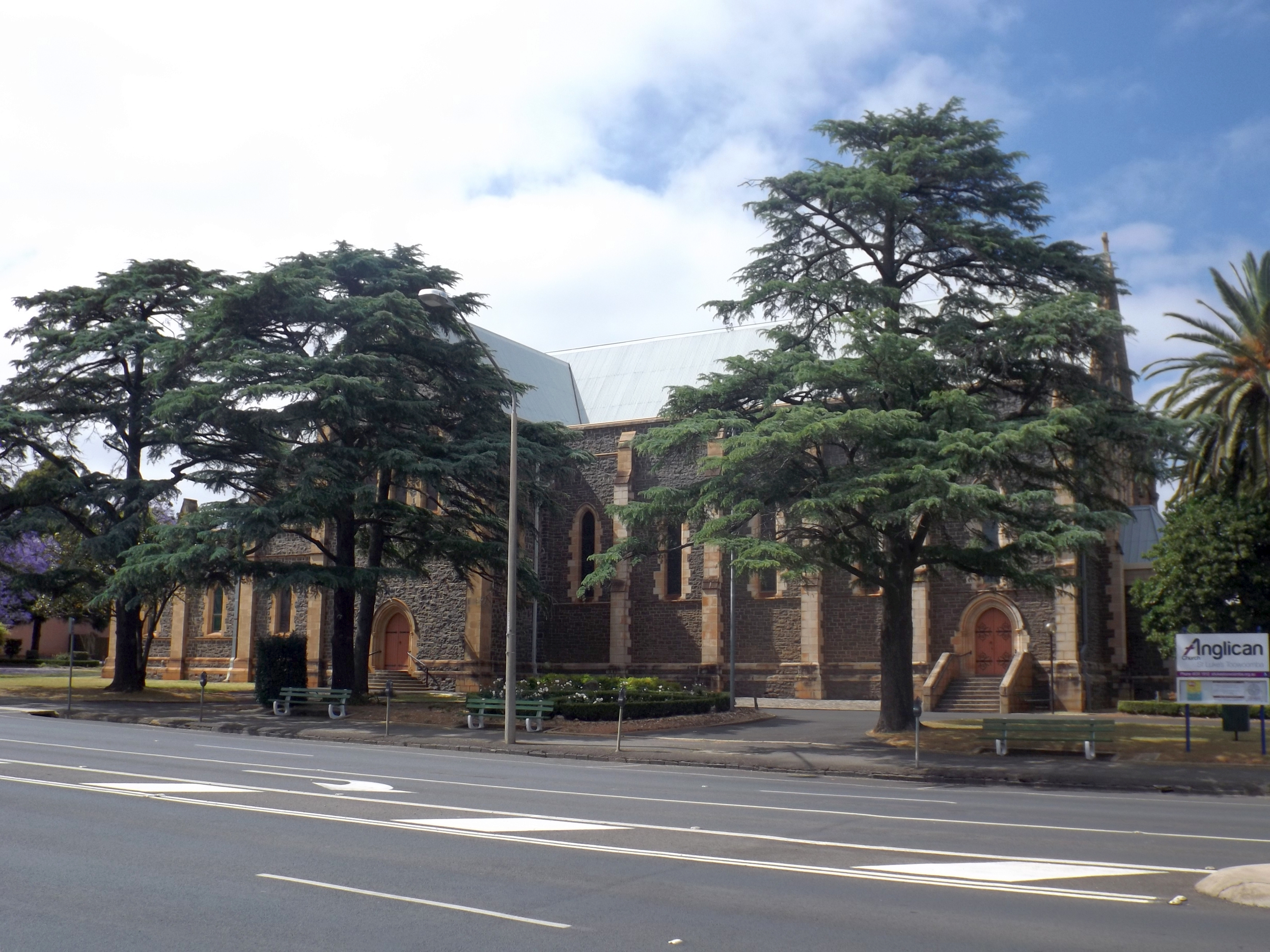
- Church and grounds, 2014

- Location within Queensland
- 27.5653°S 151.9531°E
- Location: 152 Herries Street, Toowoomba, Queensland, Australia

History
- Design period: 1870s–1890s (late 19th century)
- Built: 1897–1959

Site notes
- Architect: John Hingeston Buckeridge
- Architectural style: Gothic

Queensland Heritage Register
- Official name: St Lukes Anglican Church, St Luke's Church of England
- Type: state heritage (built, landscape)
- Designated: 28 July 2000
- Reference no.: 601878
- Significant period: 1890s (historical); 1890s, 1940s, 1950s (fabric) ongoing (social)
- Significant components: views to, memorial – chapel, trees/plantings, furniture/fittings, memorial – honour board/roll of honour, church, stained glass window/s

St Luke's Anglican Church is a heritage-listed church at 152 Herries Street, Toowoomba City, Queensland, Australia. It is the second church on the site and was designed by John Hingeston Buckeridge and built in 1897. It is also known as St Luke's Church of England. It was added to the Queensland Heritage Register on 28 July 2000.

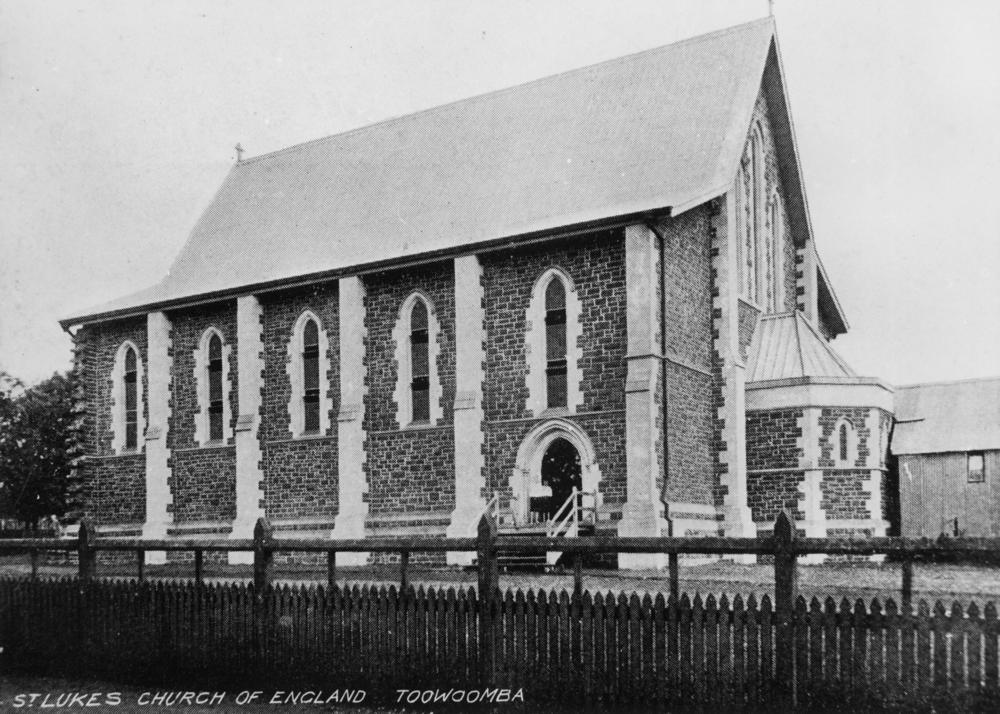
St. Lukes Church of England, Toowoomba, circa 1902

== History ==
St Luke's Anglican Church, a substantial bluestone building at the corner of Herries and Ruthven Streets, Toowoomba was constructed in stages between 1897 and 1959 to the original design of Church of England diocesan architect, John Hingeston Buckeridge. The present church replaced an earlier timber slab building constructed in the mid-1850s.

The church of England acquired land at the corner of Herries and Ruthven Streets, Toowoomba at land sales held in Toowoomba during October 1854. At this stage of development, nearby Drayton was a larger settlement than Toowoomba which had been surveyed in 1849. It was in Drayton that the first resident Church of England minister settled in 1850. Reverend Benjamin Glennie followed early settlers to the fertile Darling Downs region where small settlements had commenced in the late 1840s. Glennie had a plan to establish the Church of England on the Darling Downs through the construction of four churches after the four apostles: Matthew (in Drayton), Mark (in Warwick), Luke (in Toowoomba) and John (in Dalby).

Glennie established the first St Luke's church on the site in 1857. In 1892 John Hingeston Buckeridge (the architect of the diocese) was instructed to design a new church, which was constructed in 1895. As a result of Glennie's foresight, the land in what was to become Toowoomba was acquired by the church for their first parish church in the area.

Soon after land acquisition a building fund was established and by 1857 a small timber slab building was constructed for use as a church and school. By the late 1860s, Toowoomba became the centre of the Darling Downs and the Church of England acquired another central site for the construction of a brick church known as St James' on the corner of Mort and Russell Streets, Toowoomba. Services moved from the primitive St Luke's Church to the permanent new church. School facilities remained at the slab building. There was much debate at the time about shifting the parish from the original St Luke's site and it is thought to have proceeded at the behest of influential members of the parish, who were keen to have the church closer to the residential area around the Mort Estate. Despite the removal of the parish to the site of St James, the debate continued for many years until 1891 when the Toowoomba parish was divided into northern and southern regions, with Margaret Street forming the intervening line. In the early 1880s services had resumed in the original St Luke's and small extensions were made to the building. With the formation of their own parish, renewed efforts were made into the construction of a major new church on the St Luke's church site.

In 1892 the Diocesan architect, John Hingestone Buckeridge was commissioned to design a new masonry church. Tenders were called in mid 1894, seeking separate prices for stone, brick and stone and brick versions of the design. The church committee agreed on a stone building and to afford this planned to stage the construction. In November 1894 the tender of J Renwick, a local contractor, was accepted for the first stage of the works for a sum of £3575. On 13 March 1895, Lady Norman (wife of Queensland Governor Henry Wylie Norman) laid the foundation stone of the new building.

John Hingeston Buckeridge, the architect of the building, designed many of the Church of England's buildings following his arrival in Brisbane as church architect in 1887. Prior to his arrival, Buckeridge was articled to leading English ecclesiastical architect John Loughborough Pearson from whom Buckeridge developed skills in the design of gothic revival buildings. Buckeridge designed many fine Queensland churches including Christ Church, Milton and the Christ Church of England, Bundaberg.

St Luke's was designed as a traditional Gothic revival church, with cruciform plan (nave and transepts forming a cross shaped plan), steeply pitched roof, lancet windows, pointed arched openings, stained glass windows and a decorated interior. As well a large bell tower with steepled roof dominated the entrance corner of the building. Elegant sketches of the original design show a French gothic inspired building, with round tower projections and curved apse and chapel ends. The first stage of the building included five bays of the nave, and a small polygonal baptistery projecting from the western end of the building.

The parish have continued the completion of the unfinished building in several major building phases. In 1907 an organ from Norman and Beard of Norwich, England was installed at the eastern end of the church. In 1947 the parish installed a William Bustard designed and RS Exton and Co manufactured stained glass window at the eastern end of the northern aisle in memory of the Griffith's family. This brilliant blue window was a copy of one of the windows from Chartes Cathedral and depicts a seated and enthroned Blessed Virgin holding the Divine Son. This window was later moved to the altar area when the next stage of the construction works were completed.

In 1945 the parish agreed to complete the eastern end of the building as a war memorial and the foundation stone of these extensions was laid in 1947. A new design was commissioned from Charles Beresford Marks, which had included the northern transept and chancel. The extensions were built in stages and completed in 1959 and dedicated by Archbishop Reginald Halse. At this time foundations were laid for the southern transept and this area is yet to be completed. In the 1960s the organ was relocated in an organ loft near the altar. In 1990 the interior of the church was re-plastered.

== Vicars ==
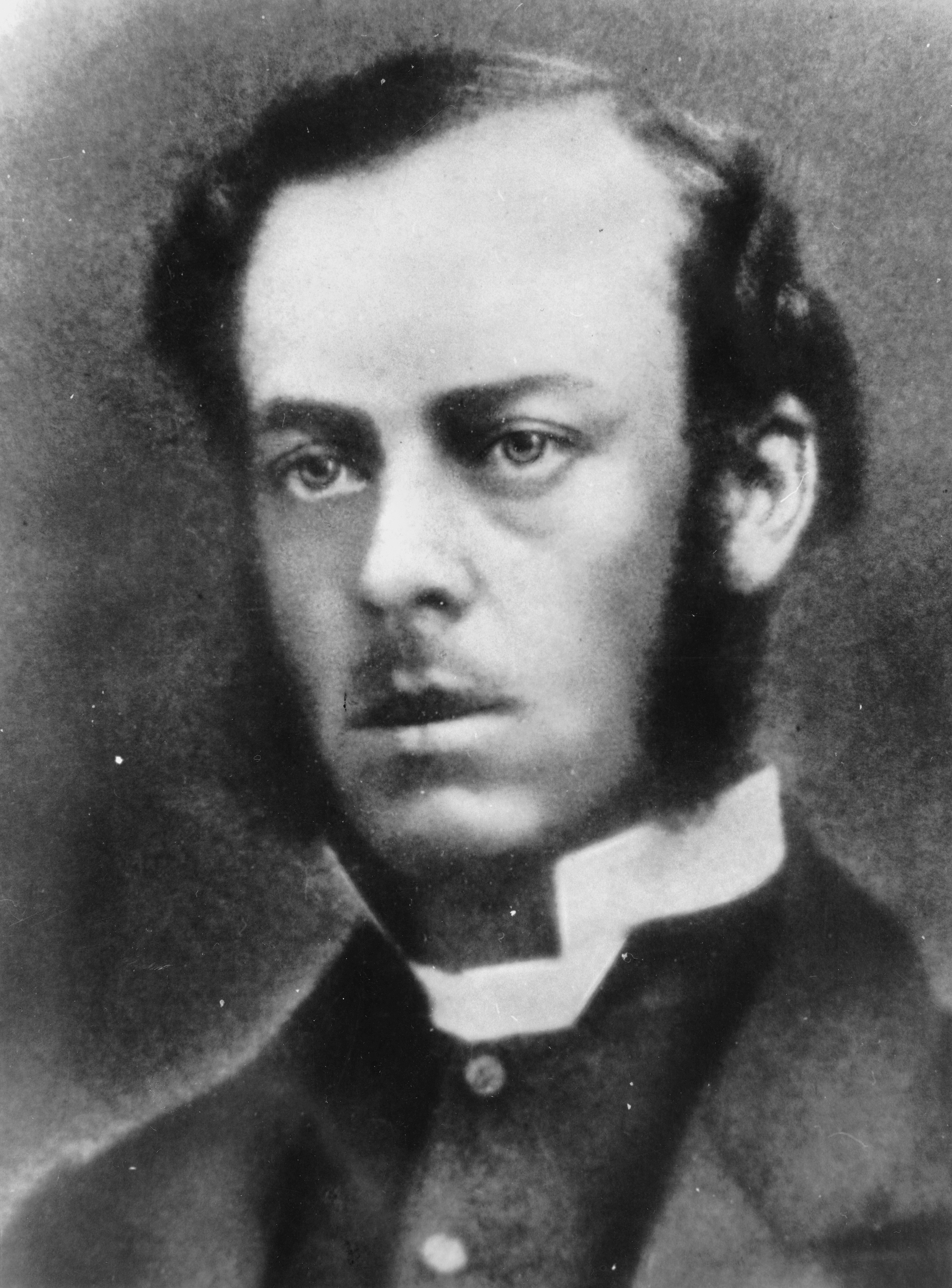
Vincent Ransome, 1860

- 1860–1861: Vincent Ransome, son-in-law of Toowoomba pioneer Thomas Alford. Following some dissension within the parish, he was transferred to St Matthew's in Drayton.
- 1929–1957: Rupert Warner Shand, father of Bishop David Warner Shand and cousin of pioneering Queensland missionary and deaconess Florence Griffiths Buchanan.

== Description ==
St Luke's Anglican Church is a substantial blue stone building prominently located on the corner of Ruthven and Herries Streets Toowoomba. The building is surrounded by large established trees, including several large conifers on the Herries Streets side.

St Luke's Church is a traditional Gothic Revival church of the late 19th century, bearing such characteristic elements as an (incomplete) cruciform plan, steeply pitched gabled roof and Gothic details including pointed arched openings, sandstone buttresses lining the building and projecting above the eaves line and terminated with triangular caps. The foundations of the building and base courses are of sandstone and a projecting course of sandstone forms the junction between the sandstone and bluestone of the walls.

The roof of St Luke's is gabled over the eastern altar end of the church, western entrance end and the completed northern transept and the incomplete southern transept. The roof is clad with corrugated iron sheeting.

The western facade of the building has a centrally located 5-sided projection which is only mid height of the facade and houses internally a baptismal font. This small projection is roofed with a rolled iron pyramidal roof from a sandstone wall capping. Sandstone quoining is found on the corners of this small projection and around several small lancets on each of the faces. This sandstone quoining is repeated on the facade of the building, around the tripartite lancet windows centrally located above the baptismal projection. Flanking the projection are attached sandstone buttresses tapering toward the roof and demarcating a change in roof line which is more shallow over the internal side aisles.

The principal entrance to the building is at the western end of the northern side of the church where a large double door is recessed in a pointed arched opening surrounded by sandstone quoining and mouldings. The paneled door features large decorative wrought iron hinges. The door is accessed via a short concrete stair with sandstone balustrade. Lancet windows with sandstone quoining line the nave of the church and are separated by the sandstone buttresses. The extension site for the southern transept which is yet to be constructed is clad with corrugated iron externally. The transept is aligned with the northern transept and the gabled roof line has been constructed.

Internally the church is organized with a central aisle separating two aisles of pews. The interior is divided by internal arcades running the length of the nave and supporting the roof on the line at which its pitch changes. The arcades comprise clustered sandstone columns from which pointed archways spring. The archways are lined with clustered sandstone mouldings. The aisles outside the columns are linked at both the western, entrance end of the building and at the eastern end to the rear of the altar area with a small ambulatory.

A carved timber altar sits at the eastern end of the building. The church is washed internally with a bright blue light filtering through the stained glass window of Mary Queen of Angels, a loose copy of a Chartres window, in the eastern end. A sandstone pulpit and brass lectern sit adjacent to and in front of the choir stalls.

In the northern transept of the church is a Warriors Chapel with carved timber altar and two "colours" (flags from battle) above the seating. The church has a numerous assortment of memorials tablets, windows, stones, honour boards and other small usually donated relics commemorating a person or event.

== Heritage listing ==
St Lukes Anglican Church was listed on the Queensland Heritage Register on 28 July 2000 having satisfied the following criteria.

The place is important in demonstrating the evolution or pattern of Queensland's history.

St Luke's Anglican Church is of architectural and aesthetic significance as a prominent and well designed Toowoomba building and one of the major Queensland works of prominent 19th century ecclesiastical architect, John Hingeston Buckeridge.

The place demonstrates rare, uncommon or endangered aspects of Queensland's cultural heritage.

The building is an unusual example of a bluestone church in Queensland.

The place is important because of its aesthetic significance.

The Griffith's memorial window has particular aesthetic value as a fine example of the work of William Bustard, a noted Brisbane stained glazier and artist. The trees surrounding the building contribute to the aesthetic value of the place.

The place has a strong or special association with a particular community or cultural group for social, cultural or spiritual reasons.

The church has social and spiritual value as a place of public worship for many years and for the large number of memorials, including an impressive War Memorial Chapel, and donated fixtures which reflect the importance of the church to the families and people forming the parish of St Lukes.

== See also ==
- St Matthew's at Drayton
- St Mark's at Warwick
- St John's at Dalby
