= Benjamin Glennie =

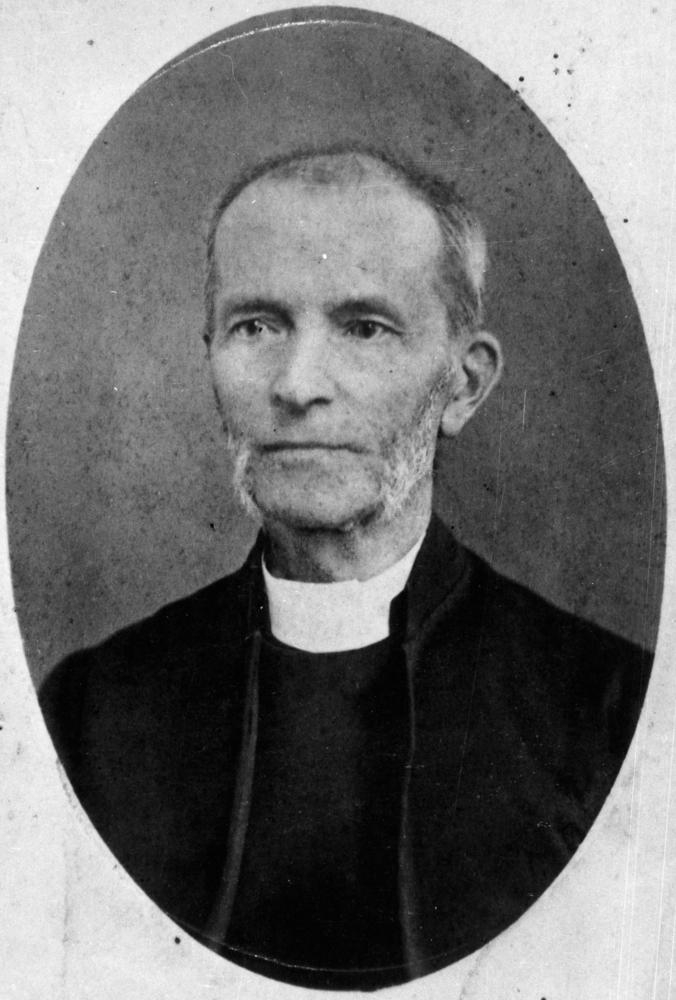
Rev. Benjamin Glennie, pioneer Anglican clergyman in Queensland, particularly on the Darling Downs

The Reverend Benjamin Glennie (29 January 1812 – 30 April 1900) was anAnglican clergyman in the Darling Downs, Queensland, Australia.

== Early life ==
Benjamin Glennie was born on 29 January 1812 in Dulwich, Surrey, England; his parents were William Glennie, the principal of a private school in Dulwich, and his wife Mary (née Gardiner).

He was educated at King's College School, London and then Christ's College where he was awarded a Bachelor of Arts degree in 1847.

== Priesthood ==
In January 1848, Benjamin Glennie arrived in Sydney in the party of Dr William Tyrrell, first Anglican Bishop of Newcastle. Tyrrell appointed Glennie as deacon to the Moreton Bay district. Although based in Brisbane, Glennie across travelled to Ipswich and to the Darling Downs for services. On 20 August 1848, Glennie presided over the first service of the Church of England on the Darling Downs at the Royal Bull's Head Inn at the town Drayton (now a suburb of Toowoomba).

Tyrrell appointed Glennie as vicar of Moreton Bay in 1849. On 29 July 1850, Tyrrell appointed him as the vicar for the Darling Downs, resident at Drayton, in the parish of St. Matthew's. By the end of 1850, Glennie had built a slab hut with a shingle roof as his parsonage at Drayton with two of the rooms being used for the church.

From 1860 to 1872, Glennie was vicar of Warwick. He was also concurrently the archdeacon of Brisbane from 1860 to 1886.

On 14 October 1868, he married Mary Broughton Crawshaw at St John's Cathedral in Brisbane.

He returned as vicar of Drayton from 1872 to 1876, after which from 1876 to 1877, he was vicar of Toowong. When he retired due to advancing age as Archdeacon of Brisbane in 1886, he was appointed the first honorary Canon of St John's Cathedral in Brisbane.

== Churches established ==
Rev. Glennie established four churches on the Darling Downs for each of the four apostles: Matthew, Mark, Luke and John. The churches were:

- St Matthew's at Drayton
- St Mark's at Warwick
- St Luke's at Toowoomba
- St John's at Dalby

although Glennie was not involved in the construction of all of the current church buildings that replace the earlier buildings he initiated.

== Later life ==
Benjamin Glennie had a quiet life in retirement. His wife Mary died on 7 May 1890 (they had no children). He died on 30 April 1900 at Wynnum, near Brisbane, where he had lived for 8 months prior to his death. They are buried together in Toowong Cemetery.

== In popular culture ==
The Rev Glennie inspired a poem On Reading The Australian Diary Of The Rev. Benjamin Glennie, First Rector Of Moreton Bay And The Darling Downs, 1848 by David Rowbotham.

== Legacy ==
The Glennie Memorial School at Herries Street, Toowoomba is named after him. The school was built in 1908 on a piece of land acquired in 1898 from funds which had been raised over many years by Rev. Glennie. After his death, the Glennie Memorial School Fund was created to raise further funds to establish the school.

On Sunday 31 March 1940, 500 people attended a ceremony to place a cairn to mark the site of the first church on the Darling Downs in memory of its founder Reverend Glennie. It is at the corner of Rudd Street and Cambooya Street (27.5999°S 151.9072°E).
