= St Mark's Anglican Church, Warwick =

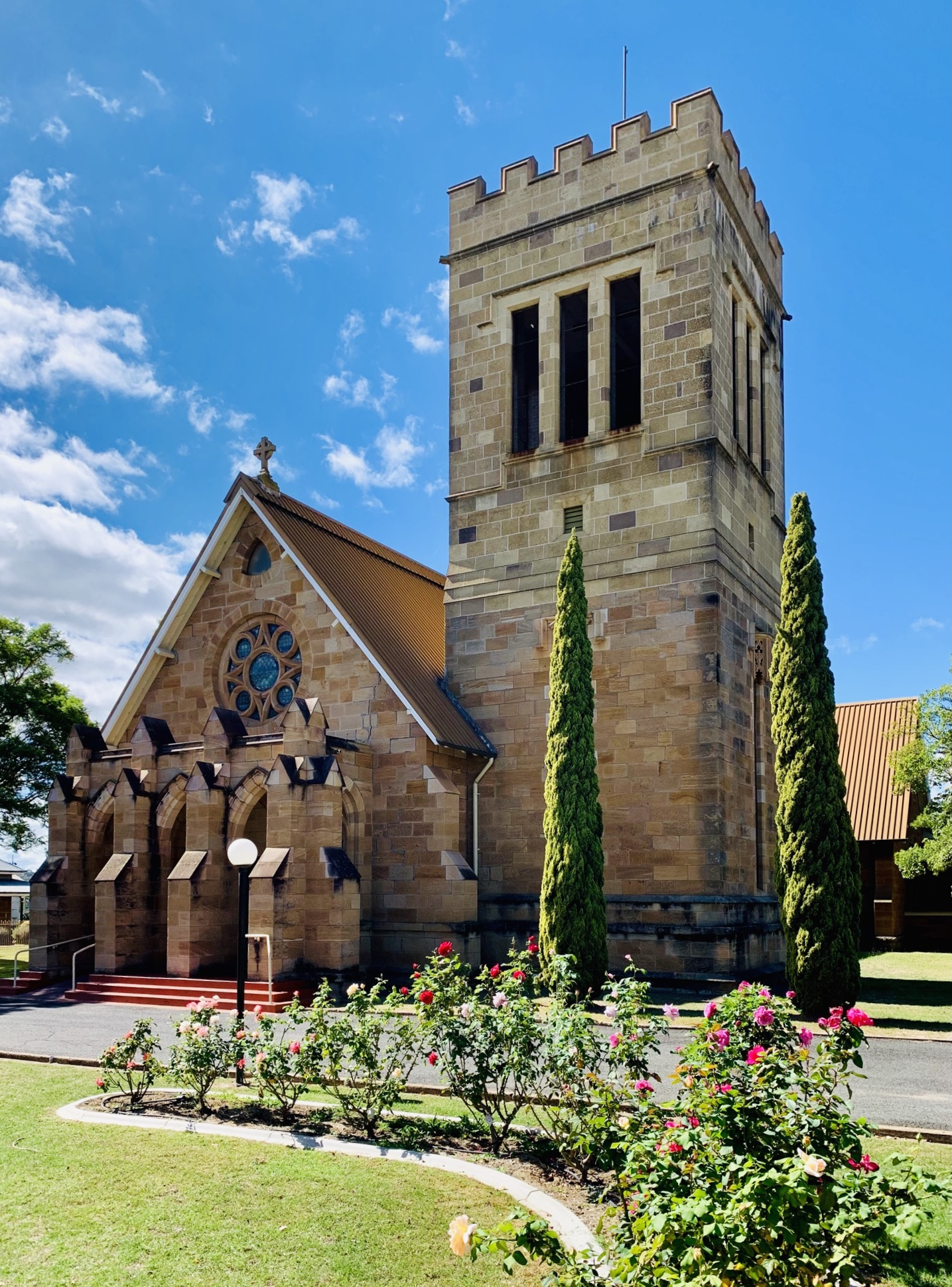
- St Mark's Anglican Church, 2019

- Location within Queensland
- 28.2162°S 152.0346°E
- Location: 55 Albion Street, Warwick, Southern Downs Region, Queensland, Australia

History
- Design period: 1840s–1860s (mid-19th century)
- Built: 1868

Site notes
- Architect: Richard George Suter
- Architectural style: Gothic

Queensland Heritage Register
- Official name: St Marks Anglican Church
- Type: state heritage (built)
- Designated: 21 October 1992
- Reference no.: 600943
- Significant period: 1860s–1870s (historical) ongoing (social); 1860s, 1870s, 1930s (fabric); 1980s
- Significant components: tower – bell / belfry, views to, furniture/fittings, stained glass window/s, church
- Builders: John McCulloch

St Mark's Anglican Church is a heritage-listed church at 55 Albion Street, Warwick, Southern Downs Region, Queensland, Australia. It is the second church of that name on that site. It was designed by Richard George Suter and built in 1868 by John McCulloch. It was added to the Queensland Heritage Register on 21 October 1992.

== History ==
St Mark's Anglican Church was constructed to designs of prominent Brisbane architect, Richard George Suter from 1868 as the second of the Anglican Churches in Warwick on this site.

In January 1848, Benjamin Glennie arrived in Sydney in the party of Dr William Tyrrell, first Bishop of Newcastle (whose diocese included all of present-day Queensland). Tyrrell appointed Glennie as deacon to the Moreton Bay district in 1849. Although to be based in Brisbane, Glennie had also to travel Ipswich and to the Darling Downs for services. On 20 August 1848, Glennie presided over the first service of the Church of England on the Darling Downs at the Royal Bull's Head Inn at the town Drayton (now a suburb of Toowoomba). On 29 July 1850, Tyrrell appointed Glennie as the vicar for the Darling Downs, to be resident at Drayton, in the parish of St. Matthew's.

By the end of 1850, Glennie had built a slab hut with a shingle roof as his parsonage at Drayton with two of the rooms being used for the church. Glennie decided to establish the (then) Church of England on the Darling Downs by building four churches named after the four apostles: Matthew, Mark, Luke and John in the four developing towns on the Darling Downs: Drayton, Warwick, Toowoomba and Dalby respectively.

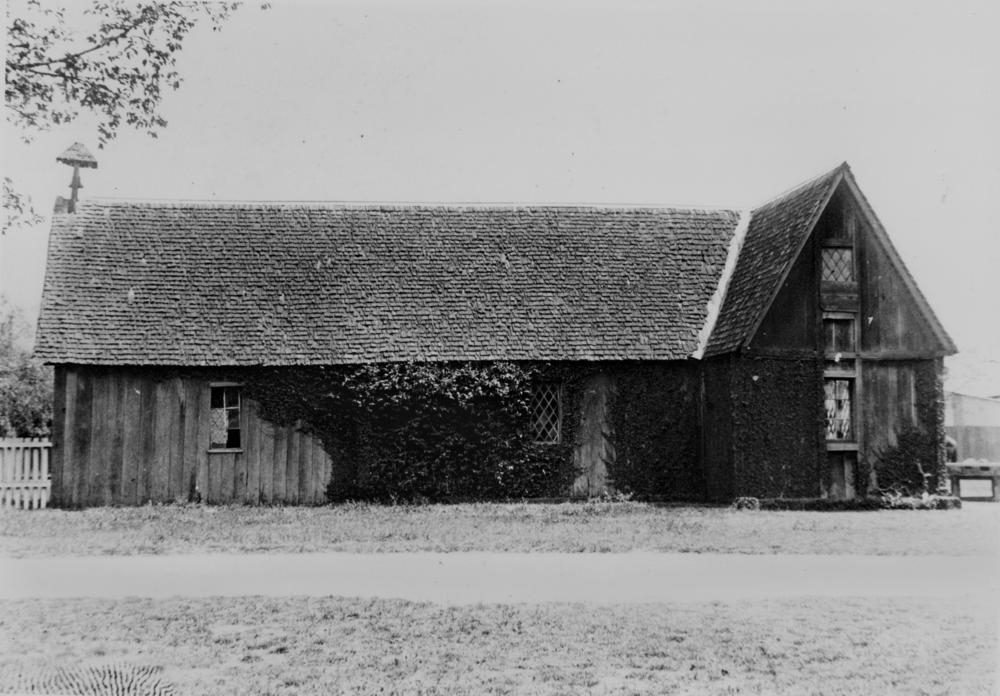
First St Mark's church, later used as the parish hall, circa 1900

The first Anglican service in Warwick was held in about 1848, and services continued in the temporary accommodation offered by the old Court House in Alice Street until 1858 when Glennie organised for a timber church to be constructed on the site of the present stone building in Grafton Street. This first church was a simple slab structure with nave and transepts, covered by a shingled roof. The building was constructed at a cost of £329/10/0 and was built by John Niblock and John Thompson. At this time the parish did not own the land, but it had been set aside for Church of England use according to a Survey Plan dated 1856. It was not until March 1872 that the land was actually granted to the Corporation of the Synod of the Diocese of Brisbane by the Governor of Queensland.

In 1860, Glennie was appointed Rector of Warwick. It was during Glennie's time in Warwick that the decision was made to construct a more permanent church building. The architect chosen for the building was Brisbane-based Richard George Suter. John McCulloch was the contractor of this early section of the present building with the stone being quarried from Bishop of Brisbane Edward Tuffnell's Sidling Quarries. The foundation stone of the present sandstone church was laid by Tuffnell on 19 March 1868. The original building consisted of a short nave, transepts, chancel and a small octagonal vestry in the corner of the chancel and southern transept. A broach spire surmounted the intersection of the nave of the church and the transepts and the roof was of timber shingles. The original timber church was retained as a parish hall until it was demolished in 1910.

The Queenslander of 2 May 1874 indicates that additions were made to church, and from early photographs these additions are thought to have been the extension of the nave, the addition of transept porches and the insertion of stained glass to the western end of the building.

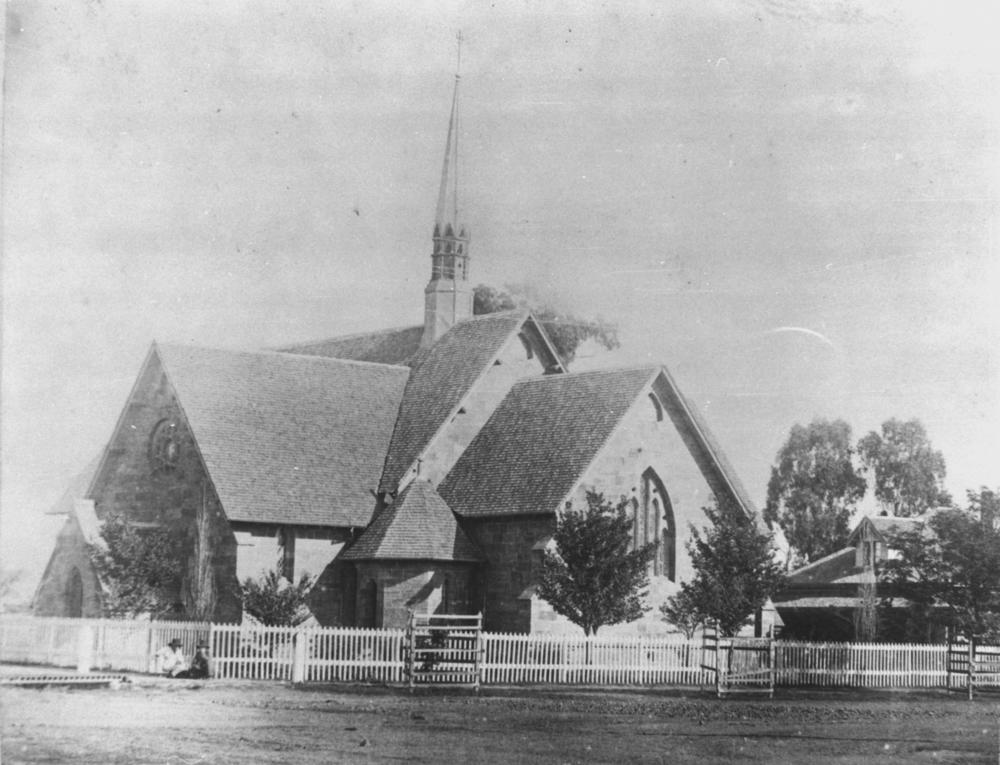
Second St. Mark's Church of England, Warwick, circa 1887

In 1938–1939 substantial alterations were undertaken to designs of Brisbane architect Lange Leopold Powell, tenders were called on 6 August 1938 and the tender of H Sanlan and Son for £8500 was accepted. These alterations, which were carried out in similar sandstone to that of the earlier building, included the flanking of the chancel with similar sized gabled structures, in the corners between the chancel and the transepts - one to serve as a vestry and the other as a chapel extension. The nave was extended at this time and the base of a tower was built at the western end of the building.

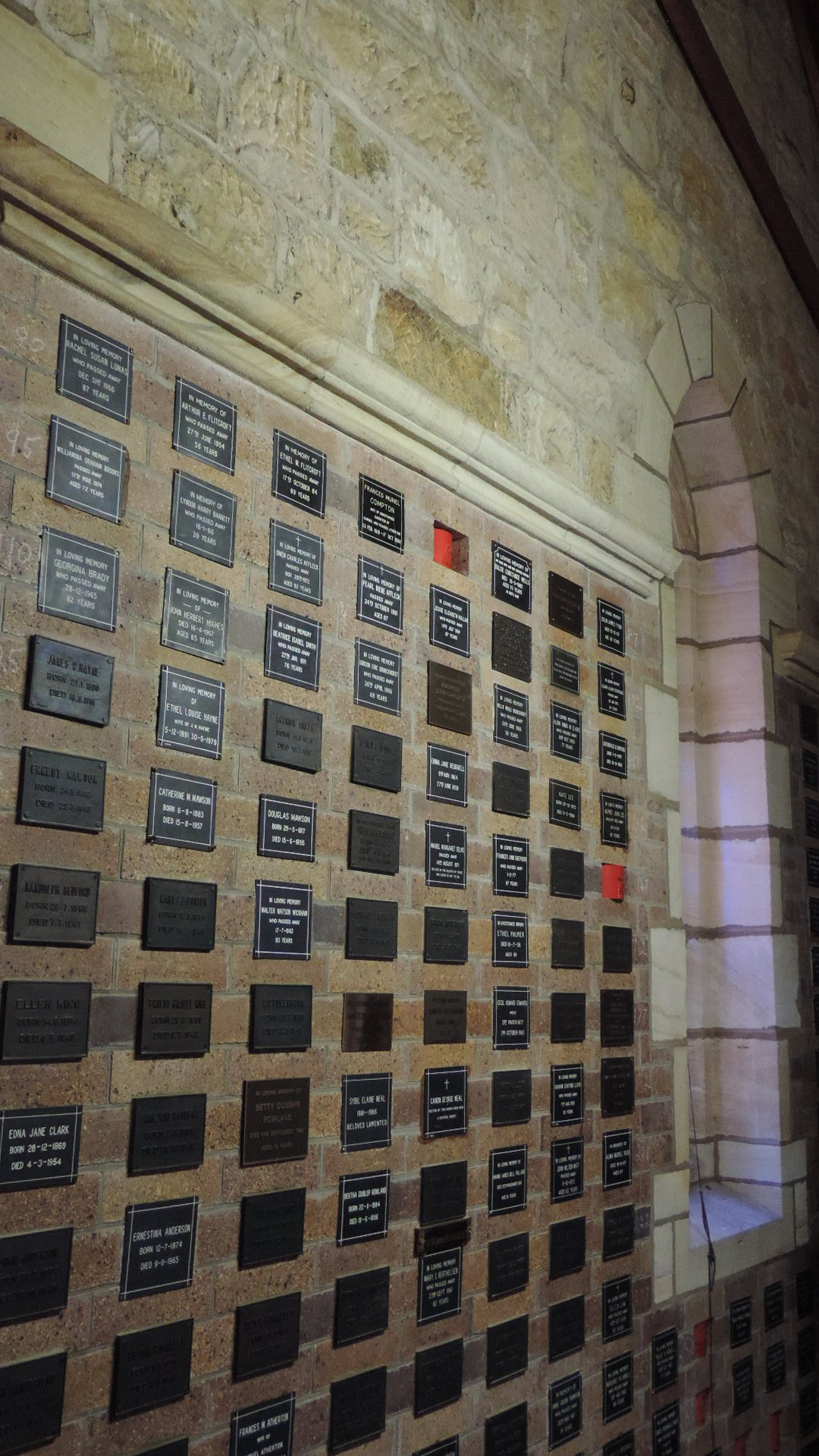
Columbarium, 2015

The 1938 plans also included Queensland's first columbarium wall.

Lange Powell died before the job was completed and construction was then supervised by Dods and Thorpe Architects of Brisbane. An extension, faced with concrete scoured to resemble the stonework of the body of the church, was added to the tower in 1962.

== Description ==
St Mark's Anglican Church is a sandstone building located on the intersection of Grafton and Albion Streets, Warwick. The building conforms to a traditional cruciform plan, with additions in the corners of the chancel and transepts, and a tower abutting the western end of the nave, adjacent to the entrance.

The building is constructed of coursed sandstone blocks, from the Sidling Quarry, with picked surfaces. Window reveals and sills, tracery, carvings and buttress facings are all of smooth faced sandstone. Encircling the whole building, two courses from ground level, is a course of projecting rock-faced stonework, approximately half the height of the sandstone blocks. The various stages of construction of the church are manifest in slight variations in the colour and wearing of the stonework.

The (modern) Colorbond roof of the building, is gabled over the transepts, nave and chancel, with discrete gables over the infill sections between the chancel and transepts on the eastern end.

Entrance is gained to the church from the western elevation, which addresses not a street but a driveway from Grafton Street. The projecting entrance porch is surrounded by a concrete stair of three steps. Three pointed arched openings, separated by buttressed piers surmounted by gabled pinnacles, open onto the small single storeyed porch. The roof of the porch is concealed behind a parapet with a moulded stone coping, interrupted by the pinnacles of the buttressing. Above the porch, on the face of the western wall is a gable rose window, with heavy circular tracery. This is glazed with panels of multi-paned diamond shaped coloured glass.

The tower, extending through two stories and a bell tower, sits on an arrised plinth with string course mouldings. The tower was built in two sections, the base and first storey of sandstone and the belltower, which is of cement rendered brick. Single lancet windows on the tower extend from slightly above the plinth, to just below the bell tower extension. These windows have hood mouldings and traceried awnings. Tripartite elongated rectangular window openings are found on the upper, cement rendered, section of the tower.

The north and south elevations of the church consist of the transepts with small entrance porches and the nave and 1939 chancel extensions. Entrance is through a pointed arched opening above which is an inverted eyelet window in the transept porches, which have steeply pitched gabled roofs, with smooth faced sandstone coping terminating in carved corbels at the base of the sides of the gable. The steps on the north have been replaced by a ramp providing access for people with disabilities. Above the porches in the gable of the transepts are circular windows with heavy circular tracery, above which are trefoil window openings. The nave elevations are characterised by bipartite lancet openings, in pointed archways, separated by buttressing. The 1939 extension of the western, entrance end is distinguishable by squared headed window openings and wider buttress spacing.

The eastern elevation of the building comprises three gabled sections, the central earlier section projecting slightly from the flanking wings. A large traceried window is featured in this central section, and above this is a recent trefoil opening. The flanking gables have a single centrally located lancet opening.

Internally, St Mark's Church, is composed of a six bay nave intersecting with transepts and terminated by a chancel, these being separated from the nave by pointed arched openings. The interior is generally of coursed rock faced sandstone, with arch linings, corbels and interior detailing of smooth faced sandstone.

The chancel, which is housed in a gabled section of lower height than the body of the church, has a ceiling lined with timber rafters which are supported on simple sandstone corbels. The eastern wall of the chancel features a quinpartite lancet window arrangement, above which, partially concealed by the roof framing, is a trefoil window. Lining the lower part of this rear wall is a stained timber reredos, with panels of pointed arches and carved trefoil and quatrefoil motif. A brass communion rail separates the chancel from the body of the church.

St Mark's has hammerbeam roof trusses and the underside of the roof is lined with diagonally arranged timber boarding. High level openings, which are now generally of glass louvres, were previously filled with timber panels, operable from inside the church, allowing light and ventilation. Some of these panels remain.

The north transept of the church, which was extended with the 1939 addition between this and the chancel, is now a chapel. The addition was added through a square opening with a timber bulkhead above. The south transept is also a smaller chapel. A vestry, in the addition between the south transept and chancel, has rendered walls and a plaster ceiling, with sandstone quoining around the openings. A reinforced concrete strong room in found in the vestry.

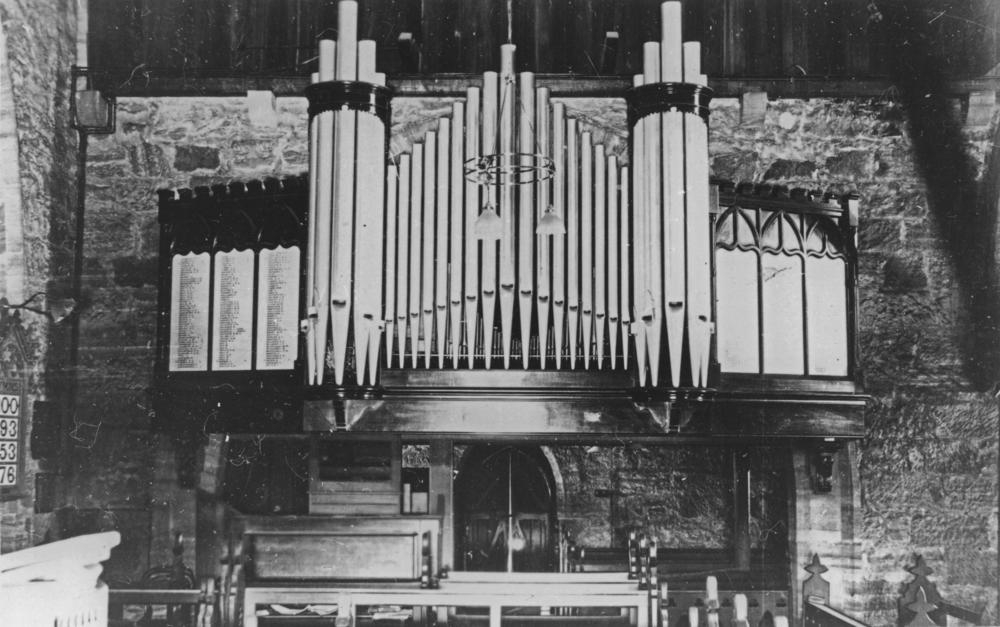
Pipe organ

An organ gallery is located in the most western bay of the church, and is accessed via stairs in the base of the tower. Two pointed arched openings, under the gallery, in the southern wall, provide access to the tower, which consists of a first floor and bell tower.

A particularly noteworthy feature of the interior are the stained glass lancet panels, paired in the nave and, singularly in the transepts of the church. These William Bustard designed panels are very finely worked with figures housed in Gothic inspired architectonic forms. This stained glass, which is generally read over the coupled panels, depict various biblical stories, including Jesus welcoming the children; the birth of Jesus; and the visitation of the Archangel Gabriel to Mary.

== Heritage listing ==
St Marks Anglican Church was listed on the Queensland Heritage Register on 21 October 1992 having satisfied the following criteria.

The place is important in demonstrating the evolution or pattern of Queensland's history.

St Mark's Anglican Church, Warwick, demonstrates the growth of Warwick as a provincial centre, and the development of the Church of England in Queensland.

The church has associations with prominent early Brisbane architect, Richard George Suter, and with the first Rector of Warwick, Benjamin Glennie.

The place is important in demonstrating the principal characteristics of a particular class of cultural places.

The church demonstrates the principal characteristics of a nineteenth century Church of England in Queensland, influenced by the interest in Gothic revival ecclesiastical architecture.

The place is important because of its aesthetic significance.

St Mark's is of considerable aesthetic value; it is a well composed building on a prominent site, which is an important element of the surrounding streetscape. The building contains many finely crafted elements including internal joinery such as the ceiling and roof trusses, reredos and seating pews; glazing and stonework.

The place is important in demonstrating a high degree of creative or technical achievement at a particular period.

The William Bustard stained glass windows of St Mark's are of considerable creative and technical achievement. The provision of ventilation and diffused lighting via the high level louvred openings is a considerably innovative achievement.

The place has a strong or special association with a particular community or cultural group for social, cultural or spiritual reasons.

The church has a strong association with the Warwick community, and in particular, with members of the Anglican community who have used the building as their church for nearly 130 years.

== See also ==
- Anglican Diocese of Brisbane
- Anglo-Catholicism
- Liberal Anglo-Catholicism
- High church
- Ritualism in the Church of England
- Anti-Protestantism
- Progressive Christianity
- Liberal Christianity
- St Matthew's at Drayton
- St Luke's at Toowoomba
- St John's at Dalby
