= Kenneth Boag =

Australian cricketer

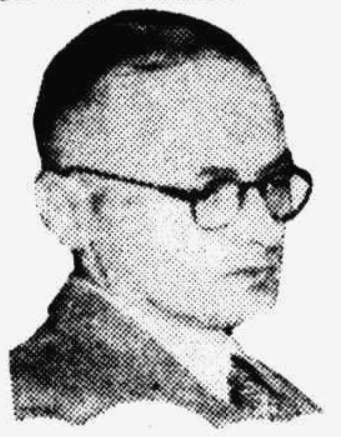

Personal information
- Born: 6 September 1914; Toowoomba, Queensland, Australia
- Died: 10 July 1984 (aged 69); Port Kembla, New South Wales, Australia
- Batting: Right-handed
- Bowling: Right medium

Domestic team information
- Years: Team
- 1933/34–1934/35: Queensland

Career statistics
Competition	FC
Matches	2
Runs scored	20
Batting average	10.00
100s/50s	0/0
Top score	12
Catches/stumpings	2/0
- Source: Cricinfo, 1 October 2020

Kenneth Boag (6 September 1914 – 10 July 1984) was an Australian cricketer. He played in two first-class matches for Queensland between 1933 and 1935.

== Biography ==
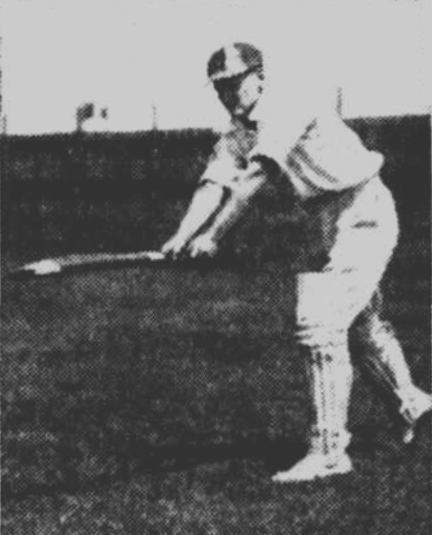
Ken Boag batting.

Boag grew up in the rural locality of Drayton, Queensland, near Toowoomba, and attended Drayton State School. In February 1933 he was one of four Toowoomba cricketers selected to represent a Queensland Country side against the visiting England team in Toowoomba. The same month he was also appointed Captain of the Toowoomba Grammar School First XI and achieved renown for scoring two centuries on the same day, the first scored in a game representing the Grammar School side and the second scored after travelling to represent the Past Grammars side in a Cup Grade premiership final. Later in 1933 he was taken to Sydney to represent a Queensland junior 'Colts' side and his performances resulted in him being selected for the Queensland First-class side for a match in Brisbane, however he only scored eight runs.

In 1934 Boag participated in a Queensland Country Cricket trial for interstate selection and was reported to be a near certainty to remain in the junior interstate side, and in December 1934/January 1935 he played his second and final First-class game for Queensland, although in September 1935 he was noted as being on the periphery of reselection for Queensland. By 1937 Boag had moved to Newcastle and it was suggested he may potentially represent New South Wales in First-class cricket.

By 1941 Boag was living in Cairns and he enlisted in the army due to the war as he was unmarried. He was initially assigned to an artillery unit in Redbank but transferred to clerical duties before joining an 'independent unit', a forerunner of Australian commando outfits, training at Wilson's Promontory. In January 1942 he deployed to Papua New Guinea. While on leave he married, and around this time both his brother and his brother-in-law who were serving in the same unit were killed. Boag returned to Australia in December 1945. He worked as administrative staff officer at the Commonwealth Bank after the war and when interviewed remarked he was "never any good" at cricket.

== See also ==
- List of Queensland first-class cricketers
