= O'Shea's Drayton Cottage =

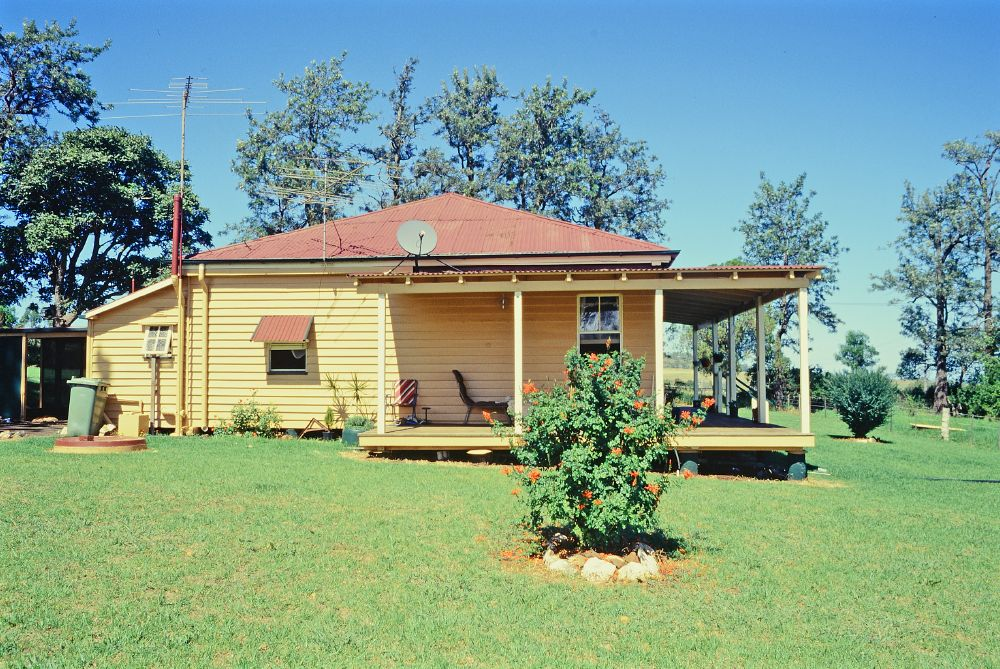
- O'Shea's Drayton Cottage, 2001

- Location within Queensland Location within Australia
- 27.6102°S 151.9102°E
- Location: 56 Gwynne Street, Drayton, Toowoomba Region, Queensland, Australia

History
- Design period: 1870s - 1890s (late 19th century)
- Built: c. 1874 - 1910s circa

Queensland Heritage Register
- Official name: O'Shea's Drayton Cottage
- Type: state heritage (landscape, built)
- Designated: 27 April 2001
- Reference no.: 601318
- Significant period: 1870s-1920s circa (fabric, historical)
- Significant components: residential accommodation - farm house, driveway, trees/plantings, paddock, gatepost/s, garage

O'Shea's Drayton Cottage is a heritage-listed cottage at 56 Gwynne Street, Drayton, Toowoomba Region, Queensland, Australia. It was built from c. 1874 to 1910s circa. It was added to the Queensland Heritage Register on 27 April 2001.

== History ==
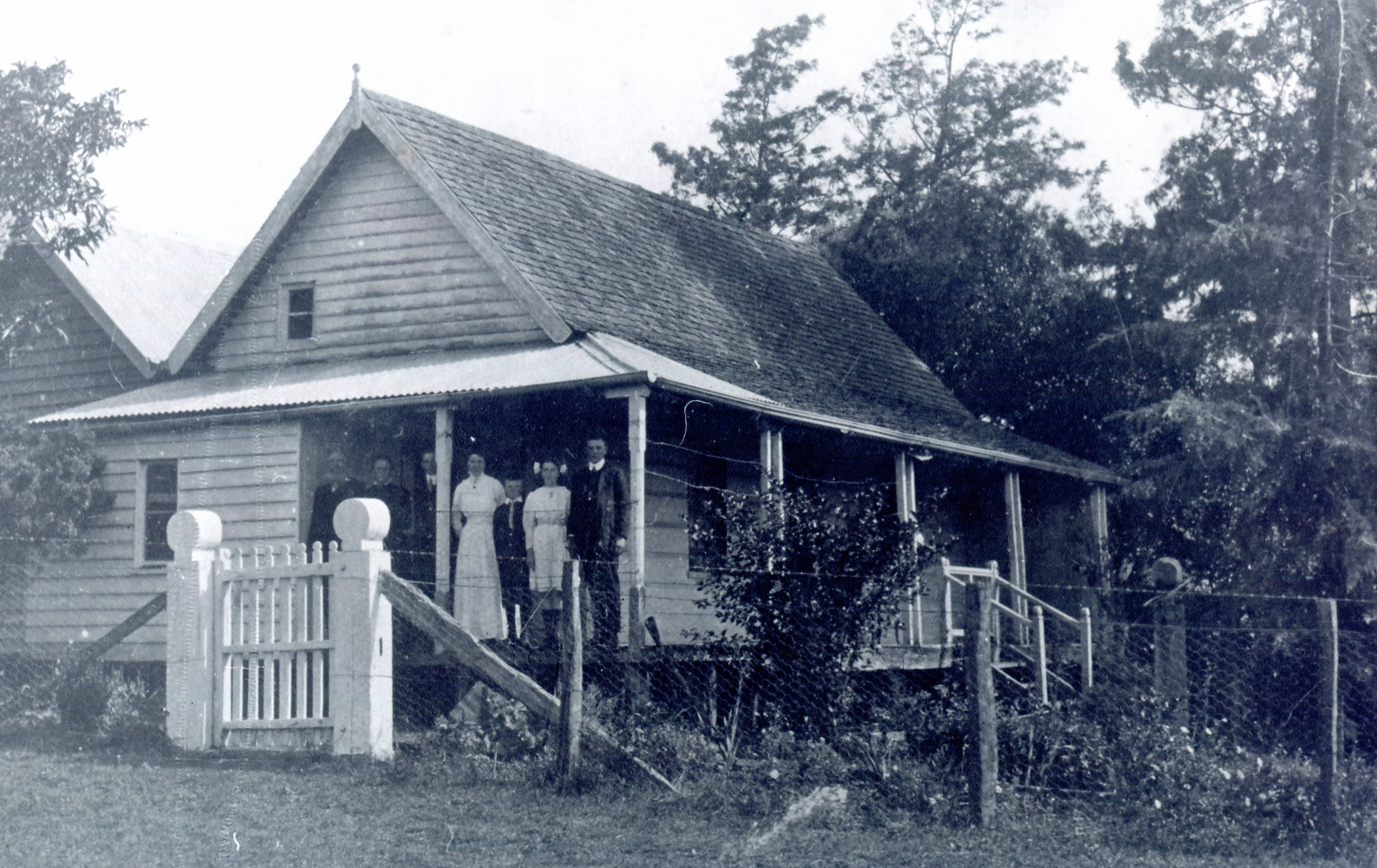
The O'Shea Family house at Drayton, Queensland. Photo taken around 1911

O'Shea's Drayton Cottage is a small, low-set, single-storey timber and tin house with a short-ridge roof with back verandah and L-shaped front verandah. Built originally about 1874 as a two-room dwelling and enlarged to four rooms this property is less than a kilometre from Drayton on the Drayton Warwick road.

The Darling Downs attracted squatters from the 1840s and Drayton became the districts social and commercial centre. In 1849 Drayton was surveyed as was the Drayton Swamp (later Toowoomba). The latter was meant to become an agricultural area to service Drayton. However, settlers and entrepreneurs were more attracted to the Drayton Swamp as it was more level land, nearer the Main Range's timber stands and had a more reliable water supply. Toowoomba's growth was ensured with the development of a more suitable route down the range in 1853. With Toowoomba granted municipal status in 1860 Drayton lost it importance.

In 1865 Patrick O'Shea, his wife Bridget and three children moved from Pilton to Drayton so that they could educate their children. Patrick had acquired the first part of his Drayton holding by November 1864 and the next portion in 1865. O'Shea obtained more land in 1888 and had purchased at auction the fourth land parcel by 1906.

About 1874 Patrick O'Shea built the first two rooms of his Drayton farmhouse. He used his axe and adze to cut and shape the timber for bearers, joists, walls and household furniture. He used massive bed logs in the ground, drop slabs for the rear wall and capped his cottage with a shingled gable roof. Additions to the house resulted in two front rooms under another shingle gable roof.

Patrick started farming but soon found the conditions not suitable so that he often did other manual work such as clearing, fencing, planting and cultivating. Patrick O'Shea was interested in his local community and in 1874 was appointed a trustee of the Drayton Commonage. In 1879 the O'Sheas and other Irish families, encouraged by parish priest Fr Robert Dunne, moved to Southbrook. Patrick took up Rockmount for himself and the adjoining property for his 18-year-old son Daniel. Patrick soon built a double gable roofed home very similar to his Drayton cottage. Here he established a dairy farm with the O'Sheas becoming important members of the Southbrook community. Rockmount, Southbrook is still owned by an O'Shea descendant.

While Patrick and his sons were dairy farmers at Southbrook, the Drayton cottage was used as a type of "town house" and was where many of the children were born. In 1911, Mr and Mrs O'Shea retired from farming and moved to their Drayton cottage. A photograph taken at this time shows this four-room house as having a double gable roof with L-shaped front verandah. The rear gable's shingles had been replaced by corrugated iron but the front portion still had shingles. A window in the roof space indicates that the family used this area. The boundary fence around the dwelling included a gate with gateposts carved by Patrick.

Patrick O'Shea's obituary under the heading Drayton News in The Catholic Advocate of 28 December 1916 mentioned that he "was an exceptionally handy and industrious man, and the many fine and substantial buildings, fences, etc on his late holdings mark the thoroughness with which he did things. He always took a very keen interest in all matters affecting the country". His widow and daughter Mary continued to live in this cottage on the Etonvale Road.

Mary Honara Boland née O'Shea inherited the property after her mother's death in January 1925 when she and her husband were living at Eddington Sliding on the Cloncurry line. In 1931 Mary returned to the O'Shea's large Southbrook property Rockmount after the murder of her husband, Thomas Boland. It is not known if she or other members of the O'Shea subsequently ever resided permanently in this "town house" on the Drayton Warwick Road. In 1960, Mary Boland moved to 42 Clifford Street, Toowoomba, where she died 25 July 1970. As she had not made a will the Drayton cottage and land passed to the Public Trustee. A great grandson of Patrick O'Shea acquired the property at public auction in 1974. By this time the cottage had a slightly pitched short-ridge tin roof and L-shaped front bullnose verandah. The end of the return verandah had been closed-in with fibro and on the northeastern end of the rear verandah was a bathroom.

During the 1980s the owners moved a small four-room house from Ruthven Street to the adjoining block. To prevent vandalism and help pay the rates the cottages were rented. Since that time the front bullnose verandah has been replaced as has some external side wall cladding and the fibro verandah room removed. A carport and recreational area have been added at the back of the cottage. As the place has not been inspected internal changes are not known.

== Description ==
O'Shea's Drayton Cottage is a small, low-set, single-storey timber building capped by a corrugated iron short-ridge roof. It sits well back on the block and faces northwest towards the Drayton Warwick road.

The L-shaped slightly pitched verandah roof supported by posts is stepped-down from the main roof. A short set of two front steps lead onto the unbalustraded verandah, and are opposite the front door which opens onto a central corridor. Either side of this entrance door is a pair of casement windows.

Internally all walls are lined and ceilings are beaded boards. All rooms have a mix of vertical and horizontal beaded boards while the kitchen also has adzed slabs. The central hall is post and rail and narrower in the back half of the dwelling.

The principal bearers are adzed hardwood. Due to the terrain the rear bedlogs are set in the ground, but the rest are supported on 300-to-400-millimetre (12 to 16 in) hardwood stumps. The external rear wall and part of the southwestern kitchen wall are post and horizontal adzed slabs while the stove recess has vertical adzed slabs. Other walls are timber-stud construction. The front exterior wall is very wide chamferboards and northeastern sidewall and part of the western wall have narrow weatherboards. This sidewall has one window under the return verandah and another protected by a sunhood. The other sidewall is broken by two window openings, both at different heights.

Three old timber posts mark what is the entrance to the property, two of which are shaped. The drive goes beyond the house to an old gable roofed timber garage, which has a rear corrugated iron extension on the north and north western side. The shed has vertical slabs along the south western and rear wall. All three parts have dirt floors. A stand of mature bunya pines and a silky oak shelter these buildings. There are also some pepperinas near the back fence.

While there is no boundary fence around the dwelling two solid, unpainted shaped gateposts remain. To the left of the drive is a small front fenced home paddock. Along the fenced southwestern boundary are a line of mature she oaks. Two mature hoop pines also stand at the rear of the cottage, creating a major landmark feature in the landscape.

== Heritage listing ==
O'Shea's Drayton Cottage was listed on the Queensland Heritage Register on 27 April 2001 having satisfied the following criteria.

The place is important in demonstrating the evolution or pattern of Queensland's history.

O'Shea's Drayton Cottage survives as one of the earliest dwellings in Drayton. While Drayton was surveyed as a town in 1849, and "The Swamp", as Toowoomba was first called, was surveyed as an agricultural area, it soon proved more suitable for urban living and underwent rapid growth and the importance of Drayton declined.

The place has potential to yield information that will contribute to an understanding of Queensland's history.

Because of its age this place has potential to yield information that will contribute to an understanding of Queensland's history.

The place is important in demonstrating the principal characteristics of a particular class of cultural places.

O'Shea's Drayton Cottage and its construction techniques demonstrate the principal characteristics of the simpler houses lived in by pioneers and working class in the colonial period. Although originally built about 1874 as a two-room farmer's cottage it was subsequently enlarged to cope with a growing family. The foundations, timber profiles and enlargement demonstrates the technical achievements of colonial days and advancement in methods of early Queensland domestic architecture.

The place has a special association with the life or work of a particular person, group or organisation of importance in Queensland's history.

The cottage has always been associated with the O'Shea family, and the original owner Patrick O'Shea was an early pioneer of the district.
