= Royal Bull's Head Inn =

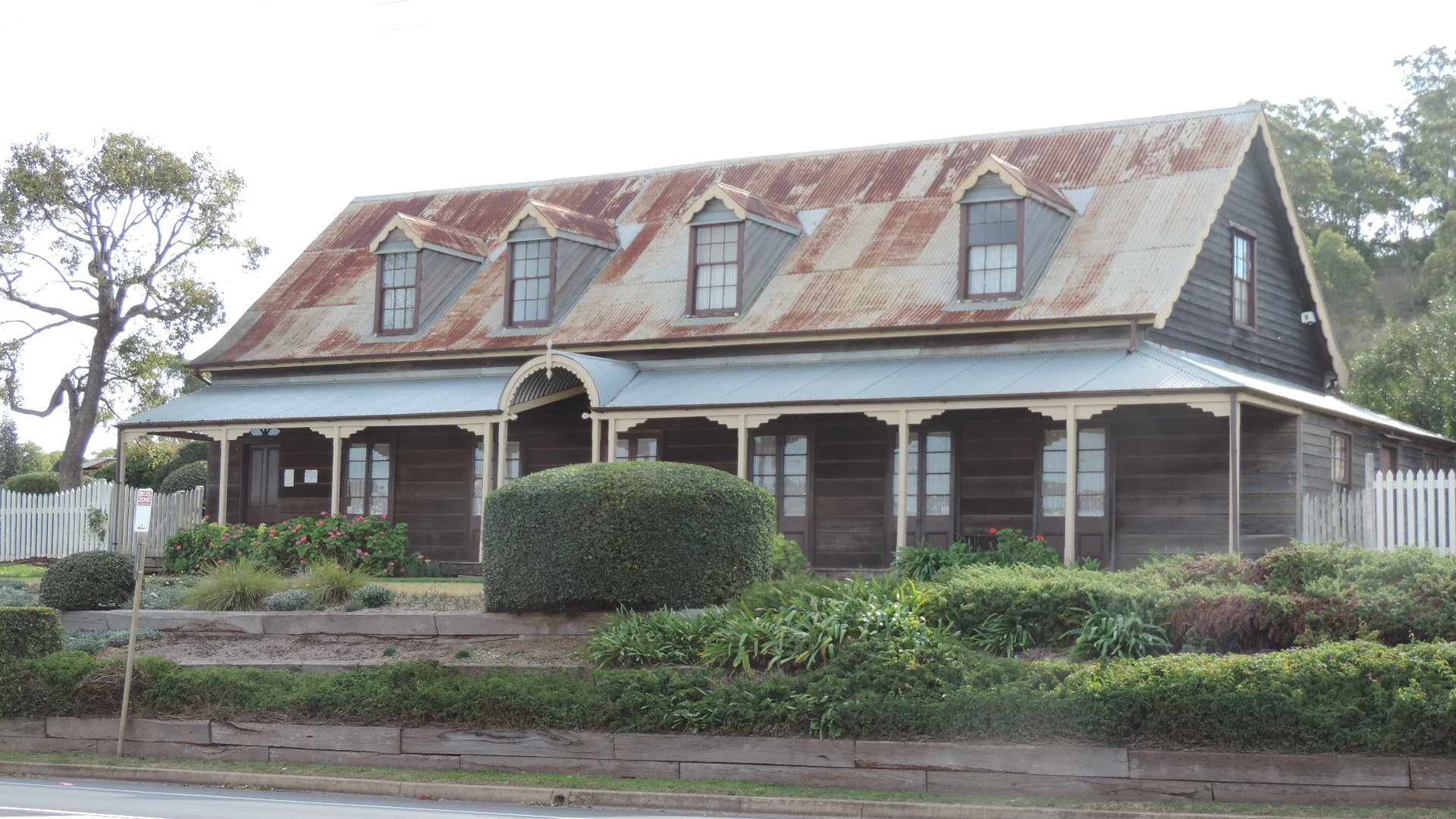
- Royal Bull's Head Inn, 2015

- Location within Queensland
- 27.601°S 151.9133°E
- Location: Brisbane Street, Drayton, Toowoomba Region, Queensland, Australia

History
- Design period: 1840s–1860s (mid-19th century)
- Built: 1859–1950s

Queensland Heritage Register
- Official name: Royal Bull's Head Inn, Bull's Head Hotel
- Type: state heritage (archaeological, built)
- Designated: 21 October 1992
- Reference no.: 600838
- Significant period: 1850s (fabric); 1847–1879 (historic use as hotel site); 1892–1952 (use as post office)
- Significant components: out building/s, furniture/fittings, kitchen/kitchen house, pathway/walkway, well, trees/plantings, terracing

The Royal Bull's Head Inn is a heritage-listed hotel at Brisbane Street, Drayton, Toowoomba Region, Queensland, Australia. It was built from 1859 to 1950s. It is also known as Bull's Head Hotel. It was added to the Queensland Heritage Register on 21 October 1992. It is currently managed as a trust property by the National Trust of Queensland.

== History ==
The Royal Bull's Head Inn, a two-storey timber and brick building, was constructed in 1859 as a major extension to William Horton's well-known 1847 hotel at Drayton.

In the early 1840s, squatters first began to take up pastoral runs on the Darling Downs, thus initiating European settlement of the area. In 1842, Thomas Alford set up a store near the boundaries of Westbrook, Gowrie and Eton Vale runs and at the junction of two routes which led through Gorman's and Hodgson's gaps in the Great Dividing Range. The place was known to the Aborigines as chinkerry (water springs up) and to Europeans as "The Springs". In 1844 Alford gained a license to sell liquor and a cluster of buildings belonging to artisans and other businesses developed at "The Springs" to serve the needs of pastoralists, bullock drivers and travellers.

In 1847, an inn of superior quality was built by William Horton at what was by then called "Drayton". Horton (sometimes referred to as Orton), was an ex-convict who had come to the Darling Downs to work for Henry Stuart Russell of Cecil Plains, by whom he was highly regarded. Horton had run a hotel for George Thorn at Ipswich in the early 1840s and, with this experience, set out to make his new hotel a by-word for comfort and service on the Downs. He called it the 'Bull's Head' after "Champion" a prize Durham bull on Cecil Plains station. The hotel soon became an important meeting place for squatters and also had a thriving bar trade. It offered lodging, a staging place for animals and was used for auctions, meetings and other social functions. The inn was large and well equipped with a parlour and all the requirements for a constant stream of visitors, including travellers, clergymen, settlers and anyone travelling to the area from the coast. Meetings held at the hotel ranged from state governance to horse races.

On 20 August 1848 the Rev. Benjamin Glennie conducted his first Church of England service on the Darling Downs, at the Royal Bull's Head Inn.

In 1848, Drayton was surveyed to allow builders to secure title to their property and Horton purchased lots 8 to 11 of Section 1, on which his inn was built, at the first land sale in 1850. Drayton continued to thrive as a service town, but faced persistent problems with its water supply which could not reliably keep pace with the number of people and animals who were using it. Wells were sunk, but did not cure the problem. Drayton's situation in a gully also made expansion something of a problem. In 1851 Horton purchased lots 15 and 16 on the hill behind his hotel, as a paddock, which were marked on the survey as unsuitable for building. At the same time, the area known as "The Swamp", 6.5 kilometres (4.0 mi) away, which had been intended as suburban lots for Drayton, was developing quickly.

The Swamp had a more reliable water supply than Drayton and soil well suited to farming. It was also closer to the new Toll Bar road over the Great Dividing Range which had a gradient better suited to dray traffic. By 1852 Horton was already arranging to build another hotel at "The Swamp" and by 1855 was offering the Bull's Head Hotel for sale with a three-year lease in place. A rivalry between the two settlements had developed which would eventually result in Drayton's eclipse by Toowoomba, as "The Swamp" was later named.

In 1856 Horton sold his still unlicensed "Seperation [sic] Hotel" at Toowoomba to Russell and James Taylor. He moved back to Drayton in 1858 and expanded the Bull's Head by a major extension made out of brick, cedar and timber, constructed along Brisbane Street adjoining the original inn building. The entire inn was beautifully furnished and was regarded as the best on the Darling Downs, and better than some in Brisbane and Ipswich. The new work was completed for the visit of Sir George Ferguson Bowen, the new Queensland Governor, in March 1860 when he stayed at the inn following Drayton's public banquet there.

Improvements to the inn, now called the Royal Bull's Head Hotel, continued with an installation of a billiard room with a first class Thurston table and new stables in 1861. William Horton died in 1864 and the inn's furnishings were sold at auction in 1865. The hotel was then managed by a succession of businessmen, including Timothy Larkin, Samuel Mann and Henry Neale. In 1875 most of the original building and the stables were sold for removal leaving only the 1859 extension and the original kitchen remaining. These are the buildings which are standing today. Horton had been a genial and popular host and without his personal touch the hotel gradually faded along with Drayton during the 1860s. The hotel was leased to several different licensees over the next few years but none succeeded financially. In 1865, and again in 1867, the contents of the inn were sold by auction.

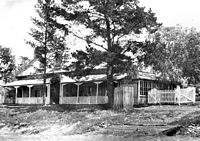
Royal Bull's Head Inn, 1880s

In 1875 Horton's estate was wound up and the older part of the inn and its outbuildings were sold for removal. At this time the inn complex consisted of the 1847 and 1859 inn buildings, a cottage, stables, butcher's shop, kitchen and billiard room. There was also a paddock for horses behind the hotel. In 1879 just over 30 years after the inn was established Thomas Price Horton, William Horton's son sold the inn to Richard Stephen Lynch, a saddler, and his wife Sarah Neale, daughter of Henry Neale. The hotel ceased trading as the Lynch family used the property as a family home renaming it "The Terrace". The Lynch family used it as their private residence for more than 90 years. The Lynch family also ran the Drayton Post Office in the building for 60 years and the office remained there until 1952 when Frances Lynch daughter of Richard and Sarah retired. The Lynch family enclosed a section of the verandah as a bathroom and kitchen in the 1950s.

In 1973 the last surviving son, Alan Campbell Lynch, died and the National Trust of Queensland acquired the building. After extensive restoration and reconstruction it was opened to the public as a place museum based on its original usage as a wayside inn. Archaeological surveys have been carried out on the grounds and former kitchen, which may contain material from the 1847 building. Pathways, terracing and other early features have been revealed. Information gained from such surveys, including the cataloguing of quantities of bone fragments from food animals, are expected to expand understanding of the operation of such inn complexes from the early European settlement period.

In 1984 the inn celebrated its 125th birthday and a year later in 1985 the ground floor had been fully restored. In 1987, work began on restoring the second floor of the inn. On 2 May 1988 the governor of Queensland, Sir Walter Campbell Q.C officially opened the Royal Bull's Head Inn. The governor unveiled a plaque to commemorate the occasion. In 1998 the 25th anniversary of the National Trust was celebrated at the inn. The renovations of the kitchen area were officially opened during the celebrations.

Restoration of the grounds and outbuildings also took place starting in 1983, as did the replacement of fences and the restoration of the dairy and stables. The inn's gardens are a classic example of 19th-century gardens. Restoration is still continuing on the building today.

=== Notable visitors ===
- Governor of Queensland George Bowen
- Archbishop John Polding

== Description ==
The Royal Bull's Head Inn is situated on a slight rise addressing Brisbane Street. It is a two-storey timber-framed building with weatherboard and chamferboard walls outside and brick nog dividing walls inside at ground floor level. There are ten rooms downstairs and five upstairs. The enclosed section of the verandah which contained the 1950s bathroom and kitchen is now used as a kitchen and tea room. The roof is clad by corrugated iron and pierced by four dormer windows which are a striking and well-recognised feature of the building. The building is set on a 1970s concrete slab which replaced the original bed logs.

The early kitchen remains in a ruinous condition at the south west corner of the main inn building. A well, possibly from the hotel period, is close to the back wall of the inn.

Much of the original area of the grounds survives and contains garden and agricultural structures added by the Lynches and some early plantings. Parts of the stone-pitched terracing from the hotel period remain. Picket and post and split-rail fences have been reconstructed. A new, free-standing toilet has been constructed in the paddock to one side of the inn.

The building contains Lynch family furniture and fittings. It has some original finishes such as wallpaper on calico scrim stretched between studs and joists upstairs. Most of the joinery is original and some is painted with decorative scenes. The pressed metal ceiling in the parlour survives.

== Heritage listing ==
Royal Bull's Head Inn was listed on the Queensland Heritage Register on 21 October 1992 having satisfied the following criteria.

The place is important in demonstrating the evolution or pattern of Queensland's history.

The Royal Bull's Head Inn represents that early period of European settlement on the Darling Downs when Drayton was an important settlement located on a major trading route between the Downs and the coastal cities.

The place demonstrates rare, uncommon or endangered aspects of Queensland's cultural heritage.

As a pre-Separation inn it is a rare building in Queensland and its construction methods provide evidence of early and uncommon building methods. There are also rare intact finishes upstairs.

The place has potential to yield information that will contribute to an understanding of Queensland's history.

As a pre-Separation inn it is a rare building in Queensland and its construction methods provide evidence of early and uncommon building methods. There are also rare intact finishes upstairs.

The place is important in demonstrating the principal characteristics of a particular class of cultural places.

The inn retains much of its grounds and the building, room layout and archaeology demonstrate its use as an inn complex.

The place is important because of its aesthetic significance.

The building in its setting has aesthetic qualities which are recognised by the community.
