= Thomas Alford (Queensland pioneer) =

Thomas Alford (1817–1864) was a pioneer in Queensland, Australia. He was instrumental in establishing the townships of Drayton and Toowoomba.

== Early life ==
Thomas Alford was born on 6 September 1817 in The Rectory, St Audries church, West Quantoxhead, Somerset, England, the son of Charles Alford (the rector of West Quantoxhead) and his wife Elizabeth (née Symes).

On 7 August 1839 he married Elizabeth Boulton at Paterson, New South Wales.

== Drayton ==
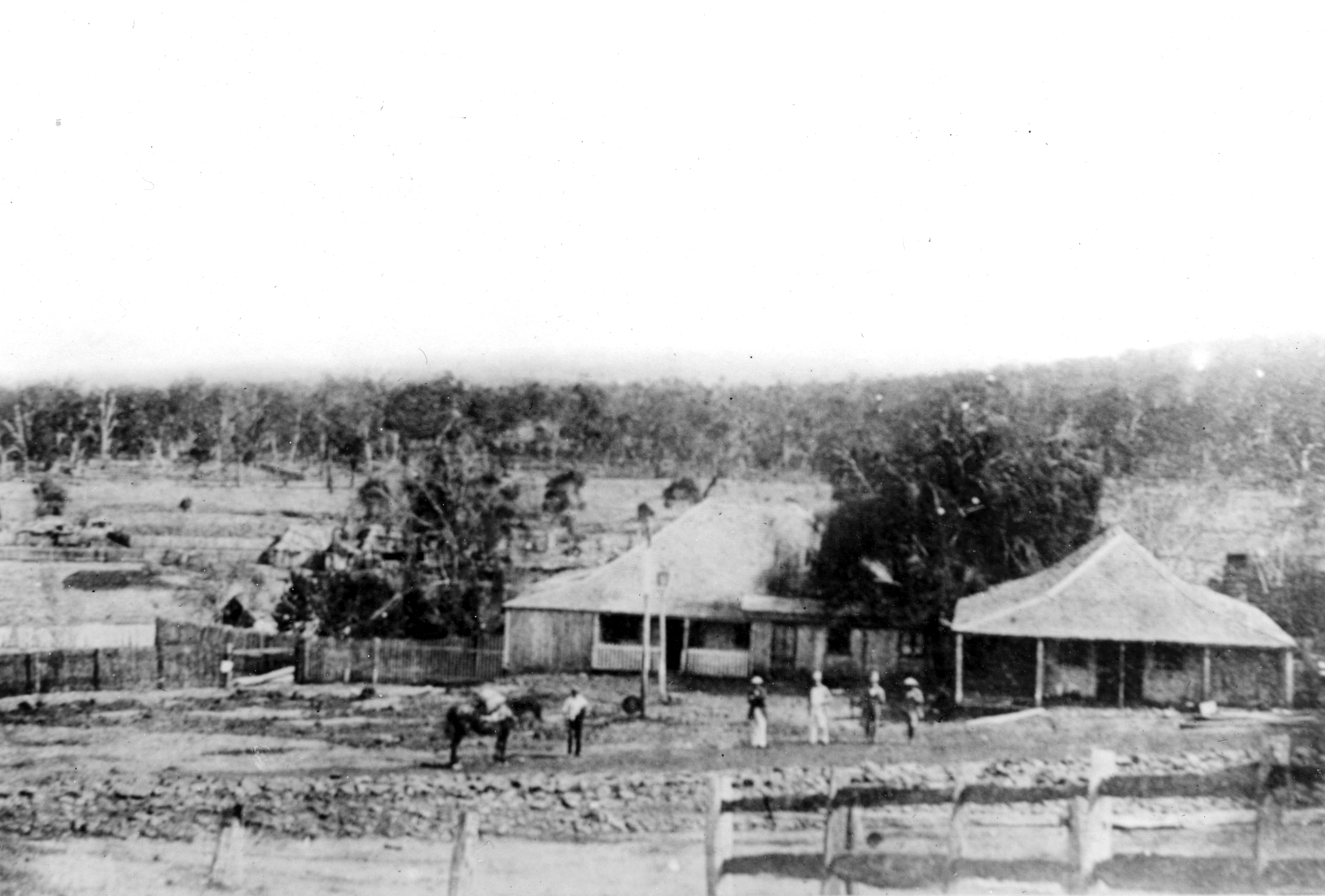
Meehans Hotel in Darling Street Drayton, originally established by Thomas Alford, circa 1856

Drayton started out as a settlement known as The Springs near a number of pastoral properties in the eastern Darling Downs in the early half of the 1840s. Thomas Alford was an early settler in the area who built a house and general store in the area. He named his house St Audries (the name of his father's church in England) and the town after his home village, Drayton in Somerset. Alford obtained a license to sell alcohol from his store in 1844, after which it became known as The Downs Inn. In 1846 the inn was transferred to Stephen Mehan (or Meehan) and Alford built a house and store that incorporated the first post office on the Darling Downs, opening on 1 January 1846.

Thomas Alford's son, Henry King Alford, was born on 22 July 1842, apparently the first white child born in Toowoomba. Henry King was to be the mayor of Toowoomba from 1911 to 1912. Henry's christening on 29 August 1852 was the first Anglican church service in Toowoomba and the first time the name "Toowoomba" appears in a written document, the name being attributed to Henry's mother, Elizabeth Alford.

== Later life ==
Thomas Alford died at his residence in Russell Street, Toowoomba, on Saturday 9 January 1864 aged 46 years after a long illness. He was buried in the Drayton and Toowoomba Cemetery.
