= Drayton, Queensland =

Drayton
- Suburb
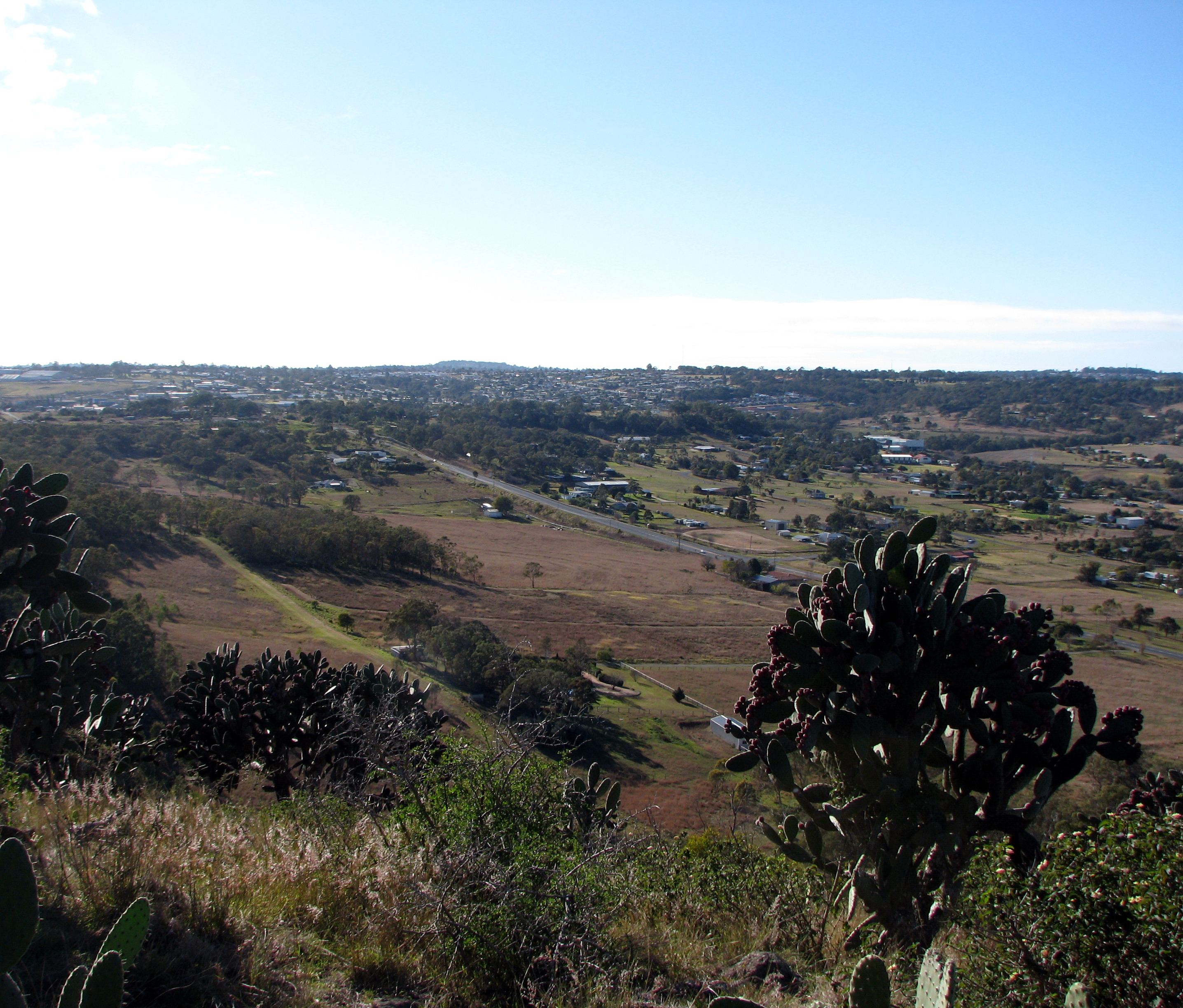
- Looking towards Drayton from Mount Peel

- Interactive map of Drayton
- Coordinates: 27.5994°S 151.9061°E
- Country: Australia
- State: Queensland
- City: Toowoomba
- LGA: Toowoomba Region
- Location: 6.0 km (3.7 mi) SW of Toowoomba CBD; 131 km (81 mi) W of Brisbane
- Established: 1842

Government
  - State electorate: Condamine
  - Federal division: Groom

Area
  - Total: 10.5 km^{2} (4.1 sq mi)

Population
  - Total: 1,813 (2021 census)
  - Density: 172.7/km^{2} (447.2/sq mi)
- Time zone: UTC+10:00 (AEST)
- Postcode: 4350
Suburbs around Drayton
Glenvale	Glenvale	Harristown
Westbrook	Drayton	Darling Heights
Westbrook	Finnie	Finnie

Drayton is a rural locality in the Toowoomba Region, Queensland, Australia. In the 2021 census, Drayton had a population of 1,813 people.

Drayton is at the outer southwestern edge of Toowoomba. It was first substantial settlement on the Darling Downs, initially being established in 1842. The nearby township of Toowoomba expanded more rapidly than Drayton, and in the 1860s the centre of population shifted to Toowoomba, leaving Drayton as a southwestern suburb.

== Geography ==
The South Western railway line forms the south-western boundary of the locality, which is served by Drayton railway station (27.5927°S 151.9173°E).

Mount Peel is in the north-west of the locality (27.6016°S 151.8934°E) rising to 711 metres (2,333 ft).

To the west of Drayton, the southern part of ANZAC Avenue forms the axis of a growing industrial and commercial district extending west and north towards Glenvale.

Drayton has a core of homes dating to the 19th century and a substantial number of homes and commercial premises dating from the mid years of the 20th century. More recently a large number of detached homes and growing numbers of multi-unit dwellings were built in the 1990s and 2000s, mostly targeted at students from the nearby University of Southern Queensland.

== History ==
The Drayton area was known as The Springs from around 1840 to 1847.

In August 1842, Thomas Alford established a store at Drayton. He also built his home and established a post office. He is believed to have named the area Drayton after Drayton, Somersetshire, England, where his father Charles Alford was the vicar.

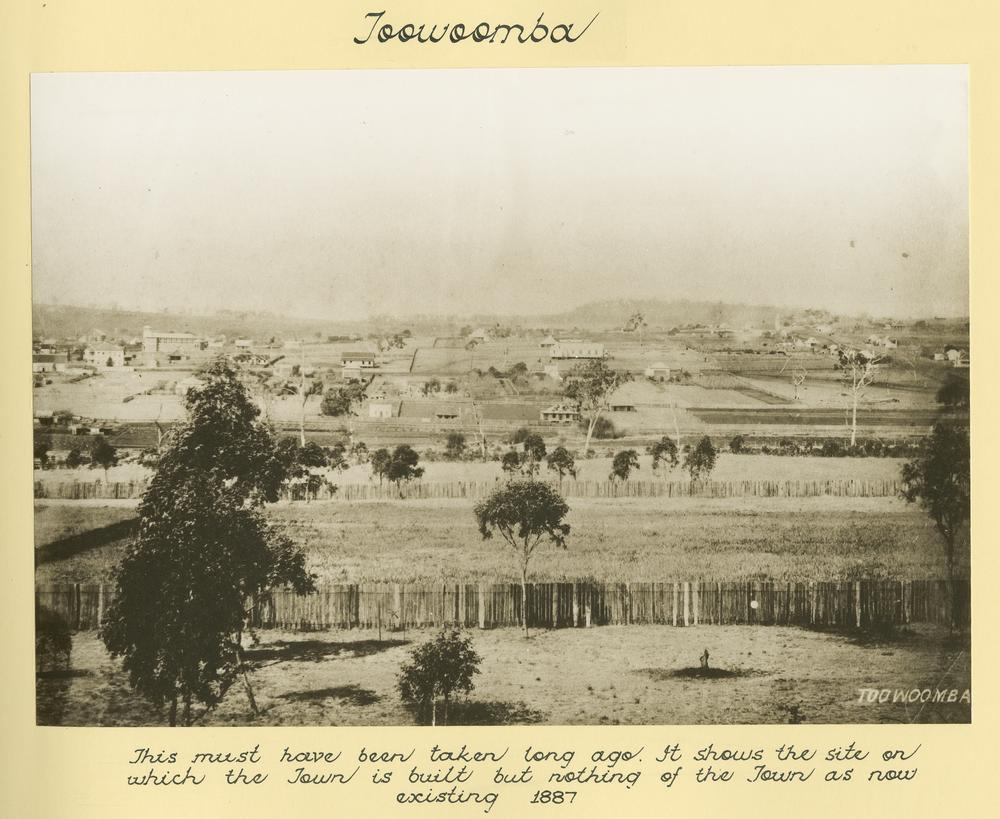
Drayton, 1887

Drayton continued to be the primary settlement in the region until the town of Toowoomba was established four miles to the north-east, whereupon the centre of population rapidly moved to the newer settlement owing to its better access to water and favourable growing conditions. By 1905, the Australian Handbook stated that the town "may now almost be considered a suburb of Toowoomba".

The Drayton National School (later Drayton State School) established on 16 August 1851. It is one of the oldest state primary schools in Queensland.

One of the oldest buildings in the Drayton area is the Royal Bull's Head Inn. The town also saw the area's first newspaper, the Darling Downs Gazette, in 1858.

From 1887 to 1949, Drayton had its own local government, the Shire of Drayton.

On Sunday 31 March 1940, 500 people attended a ceremony to place a cairn to mark the site of the first church on the Darling Downs in memory of its founder Canon Glennie. The Anglican church was on the corner of Rudd Street and Cambooya Street (27.5999°S 151.9072°E).

== Demographics ==
In the 2016 census, Drayton had a population of 1,710 people.

In the 2021 census, Drayton had a population of 1,813 people.

== Heritage listings ==
Drayton has a number of heritage-listed sites, including:

- St Matthew's Anglican Church, 45–49 Glennie Street (27.5986°S 151.9118°E)
- Royal Bull's Head Inn, 47–59 Brisbane Street (27.601°S 151.9133°E)
- Drayton State School, 71–89 Brisbane Street (27.6021°S 151.9116°E)
- O'Shea's Drayton Cottage, 56 Gwynne Street (27.6102°S 151.9102°E)

== Education ==
Drayton State School is a government primary (Prep-6) school for boys and girls at 71–89 Brisbane Street (27.6025°S 151.9117°E). In 2017, the school had an enrolment of 321 students with 36 teachers (29 full-time equivalent) and 16 non-teaching staff (10 full-time equivalent). It includes a special education program.

There are no government secondary schools in Drayton. The nearest government secondary school is Harristown State High School in neighbouring Harristown to the north-east.

== Facilities ==
Drayton Police Station is at 35 Brisbane Street (27.6001°S 151.9151°E).

== Amenities ==
St Matthew's Anglican Church is at Glennie Street.

== Royal Bull's Head Inn ==
- 1847-48: Inn first built; founded by William Horton, an English convict
- 1858: Currently extant brick and plastered timber structure substantially complete
- 1879: No longer in use as an inn, became a private home
- 1973: Purchased by the National Trust
- 1976: Ongoing restoration began

The building now serves as a show-case of life in the 1870s. Some rooms have been maintained in their original state.

== Notable residents ==
- Thomas Alford, pioneer of Drayton and Toowoomba
- Arthur Hoey Davis, better known as author Steele Rudd, was born in Drayton in 1868.
- Reverend Benjamin Glennie, pioneer Anglican clergyman served the Darling Downs for many years and was resident in Drayton from 1850 to 1860 and from 1872 to 1876
- James Purcell, an important figure in the Queensland dairy industry in the early 20th century, was born in Drayton.
