= Alison Taylor (bishop) =

Australian Anglican bishop

The Right Reverend Alison Taylor AM
- Assistant bishop, Anglican Diocese of Brisbane (Southern Region)
- Church: Anglican Church of Australia
- Diocese: Brisbane
- In office: 6 April 2013–2 December 2017

Orders
- Consecration: 6 April 2013 by Phillip Aspinall

Personal details
- Born: 1953 or 1954 (age 72–73)
- Denomination: Anglican
- Spouse: Trevor
- Children: 1

Alison Menzies Taylor AM is a retired Australian bishop in the Anglican Church of Australia. She served as an assistant bishop of the Diocese of Brisbane (Southern Region) from April 2013 to December 2017 and was the first female bishop in the diocese.

Prior to ordination ministry, Taylor worked as an urban planner in the 1980s, during which she led an Australian aid project to restore and categorise European-built heritage buildings in Tianjin, China. During this time, she was influenced by seeing church buildings used as factories or warehouses and realising that many locals did not have access to a church. Her work in China was interrupted by the 1989 Tiananmen Square protests. She returned to Australia, to Melbourne, where she became Senior Lecturer in Urban Studies at Victoria University of Technology.

After giving birth to her daughter, Taylor commenced theological studies in 1993 at Trinity College Theological School. Following her studies, she served in the Diocese of Melbourne, including as vicar of St John's Camberwell and as Archdeacon of Kew.

In December 2012, it was announced that Taylor would take up the position as an assistant bishop for the Southern Region of the Diocese of Brisbane, replacing Geoffrey Smith who had become general manager of the diocese. As part of her ministry, she looked after 47 parishes stretching from the south of the Brisbane River down to Coolangatta, and she looked after 14 schools run by the Diocese.

Taylor was formally farewelled from her ministry on 2 December 2017 and was succeeded by John Roundhill. She returned to Melbourne to take up doctoral studies on the theology related to the Royal Commission into Institutional Responses to Child Sexual Abuse.

Taylor was appointed as a Member of the Order of Australia in the 2023 King's Birthday Honours for "significant service to the Anglican Church, and to conservation".

Taylor is married to Trevor and has one daughter.
