= Eliza Cowie =

Church and community worker

Eliza Jane Cowie (6 October 1835–18 August 1902; née Webber) was a New Zealand church and community worker.

Eliza Jane Webber was born in London, England on 6 October 1835, the daughter of William Webber, a surgeon of Moulton, Suffolk, by his wife Eliza Preston daughter of Sir Thomas Preston, Bart., of Beeston Hill, Norfolk. Her brother William Webber (1837–1903) became Bishop of Brisbane.

She married in 1869 William Garden Cowie (January 8, 1831 – June 26, 1902), who was the same year appointed bishop of the Anglican Diocese of Auckland, and later became Primate of New Zealand.

Cowie died at her home Bishopscourt, Parnell, New Zealand on 18 August 1902, a mere two months after the death of her husband, leaving three sons and a daughter.
