= Archbishop of Brisbane =

Archbishop of Brisbane may refer to:

- Roman Catholic Archbishop of Brisbane
- Anglican Archbishop of Brisbane
