= Bishop of Brisbane =

The Bishop of Brisbane may refer to:

- Anglican Bishop of Brisbane, precursor title of the Anglican Archbishop of Brisbane
- Roman Catholic Bishop of Brisbane, precursor title of the Roman Catholic Archbishop of Brisbane
