= Sarah Plowman =

Australian Anglican bishop

The Right Reverend Sarah Plowman
- Assistant Bishop of Brisbane
- Church: Anglican Church of Australia
- Diocese: Brisbane
- In office: 2024–Current

Orders
- Ordination: 2004 (diaconate); 2005 (priesthood)
- Consecration: 21 June 2024 by Jeremy Greaves

Personal details
- Denomination: Anglican
- Spouse: Darius Cartwright
- Children: 4

Sarah Plowman is an Australian Anglican bishop. Since 2024 she has been assistant bishop in the Anglican Diocese of Brisbane, where she has responsibility for parishes in the northern region.

== Early life and education ==
Sarah Plowman was born and raised on the Sunshine Coast in South‑East Queensland. She attended St Margaret's Anglican Girls' School, graduating in 1990. Plowman studied at St Francis Theological College in Milton.

Plowman pursued tertiary studies in science and education and graduated with a Bachelor of Applied Science (Physics) from QUT and a Graduate Diploma of Education from the same institution, and a Bachelor of Theology from Charles Sturt University.

Plowman's early academic work included a deep appreciation for the natural world, which she later linked to a vocational call into ministry.

== Ordination and early clerical career ==
Plowman was ordained deacon in 2004 and priest in 2005, becoming the second woman bishop for the Anglican Church Southern Queensland. After her ordination she worked as a physics and mathematics teacher, a role she held before answering a “vocational call into youth ministry”.

Plowman subsequently served in parish youth‑ministry positions and held broader Diocesan youth‑ministry roles, gaining experience in pastoral care, program development and leadership. During this period she continued teaching, returning to schools after periods of diocesan service.

In 2022 Plowman was appointed diocesan director of ordinands and vocations (DDOV), a senior administrative role overseeing the preparation and placement of candidates for ordained ministry within the diocese.

Since her ordination Plowman has served in the following positions:

- Chaplain, All Saints Anglican School 2004-06;
- PTO Wynnum 2006-08;
- Associate Chaplain, Anglican Church Grammar School 2008-09;
- Chaplain, Cannon Hill Anglican College 2009-19;
- Honorary Canon, St John's Cathedral 2014-18;
- Residentiary Canon, St John's Cathedral 2018-20;
- Mission Chaplain — Director of Ordinands and Vocations 2020-21;
- Mission Chaplain, Director of Discernment and Formation from September 2021; and
- Honorary Canon, St John's Cathedral from 2021.;

== Appointment as assistant bishop ==
On 21 June 2024 Plowman was consecrated as an assistant bishop with responsibility for the Northern Region of the Anglican Diocese of Brisbane. The Northern Region covers the northern part of the diocese, extending north to Bundaberg and out west to Gayndah.

The ceremony took place at St John's Cathedral in Brisbane, attended by more than 700 people from across Australia. Archbishop Jeremy Greaves announced the appointment, stating that he was “pleased to announce that the Reverend Canon Sarah Plowman has accepted my invitation to be an Assistant Bishop in the Diocese of Brisbane and to serve as Bishop for the Northern Region” . The event was marked by Rev Kaye Pitman’s sermon and the ringing of cathedral bells.

== Personal life ==
Plowman is married to Darius Cartwright with whom she is raising four teenage daughters.
