= Cameron Venables (bishop) =

Australian bishop

The Right Reverend Cameron Venables
- Bishop of the Western Region; Diocese of Brisbane
- Church: Anglican Church of Australia
- Diocese: Brisbane
- Installed: 2014

Orders
- Ordination: 1993 (deacon); 1995 (priest)
- Consecration: 24 June 2014 by Phillip Aspinall

Personal details
- Denomination: Anglican
- Spouse: Kate
- Children: 3

Cameron Venables (born 1965) is an Australian bishop in the Anglican Church of Australia. He has served as an assistant bishop of the Diocese of Brisbane for the Western Region since 2014.

Prior to being appointed as bishop, Venables held a number of positions in Australia and Papua New Guinea. Immediately prior to his episcopal appointment he was ministry co-ordinator and rector of All Saints' Community in Rockhampton, chaplain to Rockhampton Grammar School and an archdeacon.

Venables was appointed as Bishop of the Western Region of the Diocese of Brisbane, a position which is based in Toowoomba, in 2014, replacing Rob Nolan who had held the position since 2003.
