= William Webber (surgeon) =

English surgeon

William Webber (1800–1875) was a surgeon who founded the Norwich Royal Free Hospital for Incurables. He was elected a Fellow of the Royal College of Surgeons but, on a matter of principle, refused to sign the acceptance declaration. He was said to be always a ‘man with a grievance’, and in later life ended up in debtors' prison for failing to pay the damages from a libel case that he had lost.

== Norwich Royal Free Hospital for Incurables ==
Webber was born in Friston, Suffolk and studied medicine at St Bartholomew's Hospital, later working in St Giles, Norwich. In the 1850 he was the driving force in founding (and initially funding) the Norwich Royal Free Hospital for Incurables. Despite support from the 2nd Duke of Wellington the hospital eventually failed.

== Moulton Paddocks ==
From about 1843, Webber owned a farm near Newmarket in Suffolk called Moulton Paddocks where he bred racehorses. He developed and improved the property over several years and two of his children were born there. Sir Robert Pigot leased Moulton Paddocks from him in 1849 for his racehorses. Webber sold the farm in 1857, and about this period he made many attempts to get his design of anti-ligature forceps introduced into the London Hospitals.

== Fellowship of the Royal College of Surgeons ==
Webber became a Licentiate of the Society of Apothecaries in 1821. He became a Member of the Royal College of Surgeons in 1822 and in 1859 was elected a Fellow, but refused to sign the bye-laws and the declaration. He argued that he had not been elected on a previous occasion, therefore, why was he now so worthy; he also wanted to know who had blocked his first election. The council of the RCS took legal advice on the matter and were told to let the matter blow over. Because Webber had failed to pay the Fellowship fee, he remained on the register as a Member.

== Royal Tunbridge Wells ==
By 1861 Webber had moved his family to Tunbridge Wells. One of many libel cases he became involved with concerned sewage disposal in the town. He and his family faced violent hostility from many in the town when a letter he had sent to the authorities about the issue was published. Public feeling became so intense that an affray occurred that came to be known as the Webber Riots when the Riot Act had to be read in the Pantiles. He won a libel case against the person responsible for publishing a defamatory notice that may have incited the hostility, but a further libel action, brought by Mr C Trustram, a fellow medical practitioner in the town, went against him. Webber failed to pay the award and in 1866 was declared bankrupt, spending 5 months in a debtors' prison. Webber had also been declared a bankrupt in 1862 following a lost libel case.

Webber was undoubtedly a fine surgeon and a public spirited man, the recipient of several civic awards for his contributions to society. However, he could be his own worst enemy. In a libel case (brought by Spencer Wells in 1862), Webber harangued a judge, saying that his counsel had not followed his instructions to call him to the witness stand. After listening to this diatribe, the judge said that his council had been wise not to allow him in the box, as his conduct would only have gone to swell and aggravate the damages awarded against him.

== Final years ==
In 1871 Webber and his family were living in Kingston upon Thames. He died on 12 May 1875 in Ramsgate Kent. His wife Eliza, daughter of Sir Thomas Hulton Preston 1st Baronet, died in 1884. One of their sons - William Thomas Thornhill Webber - became the Bishop of Brisbane, Australia. Another son, Lieutenant Henry Webber of the 7th Bn. South Lancashire Regiment, was killed in action on 21 July 1916 during the Battle of the Somme aged 67. His is the oldest known battle death recorded for the First World War. For over forty years he was a member of the London Stock Exchange. A daughter Eliza Jane Webber (1835–1902) was the wife of William Garden Cowie, Primate of New Zealand.
