= Diocese of Brisbane =

Diocese of Brisbane or Archdiocese of Brisbane could refer to:

- Anglican Diocese of Brisbane
- Catholic Archdiocese of Brisbane
