= William Wand =

English Anglican bishop (1885–1977)

The Right Reverend and Right Honourable William Wand KCVO
- Bishop of London
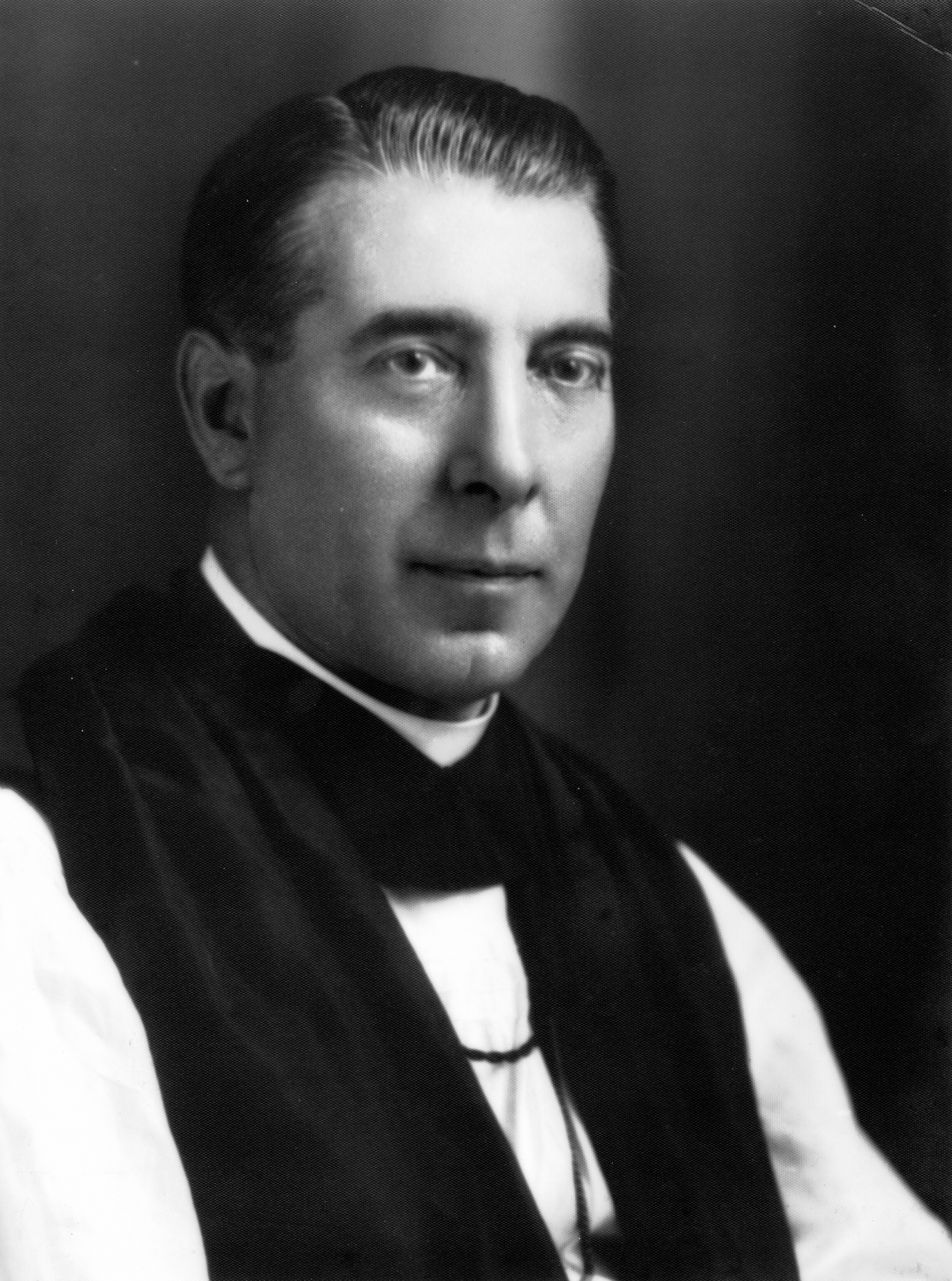
- Wand as Archbishop of Brisbane
- Church: Church of England
- Province: Province of Canterbury
- Diocese: Diocese of London
- In office: 1945–1955
- Predecessor: Geoffrey Fisher
- Successor: Henry Montgomery Campbell
- Other posts: Bishop of Bath and Wells (1943–1945); Archbishop of Brisbane (1934–1943)

Orders
- Ordination: 1908 (deacon); 1909 (priest)
- Consecration: 1 May 1934 by archbishop Lang

Personal details
- Born: John William Charles Wand; 25 January 1885 Grantham, Lincolnshire, England
- Died: 16 August 1977 (aged 92) College of St Barnabas, Lingfield, Surrey, England
- Denomination: Anglicanism
- Parents: Arthur James Henry Wand and Elizabeth Ann Ovelin, née Turner
- Spouse: Amy Agnes Wiggins (m. 1911; died 1966)
- Education: The King's School, Grantham
- Alma mater: St Edmund Hall, Oxford; Bishop Jacob Hostel

John William Charles Wand, KCVO (25 January 1885 – 16 August 1977) was an English Anglican bishop. He was the Archbishop of Brisbane in Australia before returning to England to become the Bishop of Bath and Wells and, later, Bishop of London.

== Early life ==
William Wand was born in Grantham, Lincolnshire, the son of Arthur James Henry Wand, a butcher, and his wife Elizabeth Ann Ovelin, née Turner. Despite Wand's father being a staunch Calvinist, his mother brought him up in the Church of England. Educated at The King's School, Grantham and St Edmund Hall, Oxford, where he took first-class honours in theology (BA, 1907; MA, 1911), he prepared for ordination at Bishop Jacob Hostel, Newcastle upon Tyne. He was ordained a deacon in 1908 and a priest in 1909. He served curacies at Benwell and Lancaster. On 11 October 1911 he married Amy Agnes Wiggins (1883–1966) at St Leonard's parish church in Watlington, Oxfordshire and they had two children. In 1914, he was appointed vicar-choral of Salisbury, and became part of a cathedral family centred on ‘the Close’.

== World War I ==
Wand volunteered for the army chaplaincy in July, 1915. He was Anglo-Catholic in a chaplaincy in which ‘low church’ predominated. He was posted to Gallipoli, and would write vividly of his experience there. For example, his simile of Suvla Bay conveys the fearsome context of British positions on a narrow beach. "Our position on that beach was rather like that of a theatre orchestra as he turns his back on the stage and looks up at the tiers of boxes and galleries in front and on either hand. Only in this case they were not filled with an applauding audience but with the enemy and his guns".

Wand's autobiography is an evocative but rarely used source of first-hand experience of Gallipoli, and Wand also wrote letters published in the Salisbury Diocesan Chronicle, including a reflection on how the reputation of padres depended on their willingness to display bravery. "The soldier needs not only a man who can preach to him, however eloquently, or pray with him, however movingly, or arranges his recreation for him, however good humouredly, but one who will lay his remains to rest in his last resting place in spite of the terror by night or the arrow that flieth by day. And who can blame him?"

Wand was attached to Australian hospitals and hospital ships but caught paratyphoid and had to be evacuated to Malta and then to London. He had recovered by April, 1916, and was posted to Rouen and after the Armistice, to Cologne.

== Archbishop of Brisbane ==
Demobilised in March 1919, Wand was made perpetual curate of St Mark's, Salisbury, where St Clair Donaldson was bishop. In 1925 Wand became a fellow and the dean of Oriel College, Oxford and university lecturer in church history. Eight years later Bishop St Clair Donaldson was asked by archbishop Cosmo Lang to nominate a candidate for the see of Brisbane as archbishop.

Wand was consecrated in St Paul's Cathedral, London, on 1 May 1934, by archbishop Lang, together with the new bishop of Johannesburg and the suffragan bishop of Plymouth. He was enthroned in St John's Cathedral, Brisbane on 5 September, after arriving in Brisbane on 30 August.

Wand's arrival in Queensland was almost immediately clouded by the death in a climbing accident, near Chamonix-Mont-Blanc on the France/Switzerland border, of his only son, Paul (1912–34). He had a difficult reception: those who had wanted a local dignitary as their new bishop united to oppose Wand. His attempts to eradicate slackness made him appear authoritarian to his clergy. Sturdy in appearance, shy and gracious, Wand was often seen as being aloof and something of an intellectual snob though this belied his natural humour and quick wit. The decision to move St Francis's Theological College from Nundah to the Bishopsbourne property was unpopular, although Wand's relations with its students won him their respect and affection and its proximity to the Archbishop's home improved the standards of training. His establishment of a property and finance board to handle the economic problems of the diocese also did not meet with general favour.

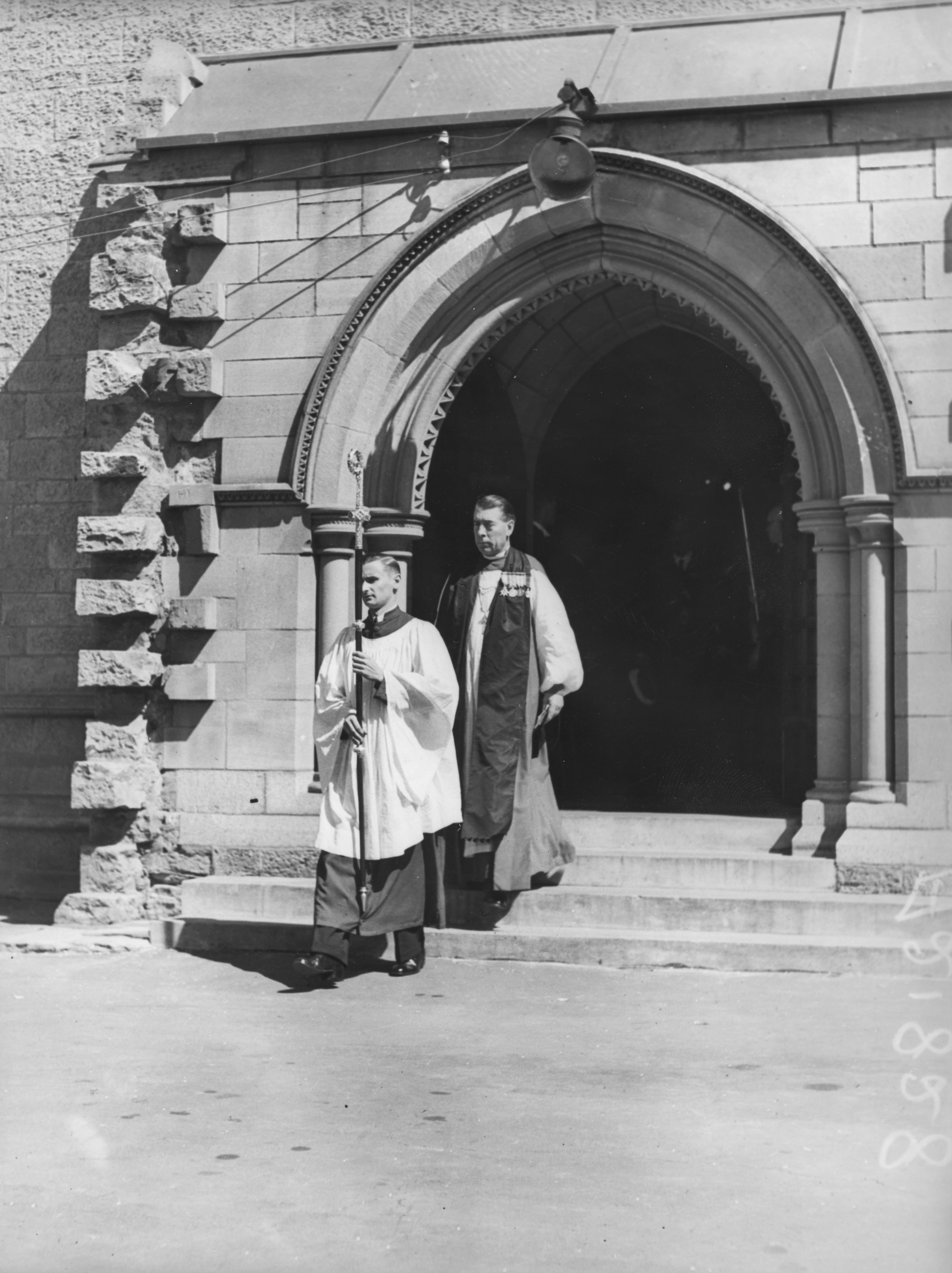
Archbishop Wand leaving St John's Cathedral, Brisbane after service on ANZAC Day, 25 April 1937

As a member of the University of Queensland senate, Wand worked to promote biblical studies and helped to create the first university theological faculty in Australia. During his episcopate he wrote a weekly article for The Courier-Mail, translated the New Testament epistles and gave the Moorhouse lectures in Melbourne in 1936.

He consecrated Ss Peter and Paul Cathedral, Dogura, Papua (now Papua New Guinea) on 29 October 1939. The date was continually altered owing to the start of World War II and its isolated position. Dogura is in Milne Bay Province. The cathedral was built on a battle site, held 800 with a further 500 standing outside at the consecration.

Wand made a lecture tour of the United States of America in 1940. He argued in support of a new constitution for the Church, but thought that the proposed appellate tribunal should have a majority of bishops, rather than legal laymen, to determine points of doctrine.

== Bishop of Bath and Wells ==
During World War II, when Brisbane resembled a garrison town, Wand and his wife worked for the Soldiers, Sailors and Airmen's Help Society. His 1942 address to the Royal Society of St George defended the British war effort and was published as the pamphlet, "Has Britain Let Us Down?" This brought Wand to the attention of Brendan Bracken, Minister of Information, and of Prime Minister Winston Churchill.

It was already known that Wand was unpopular in Australia since the Archbishop of Perth had written to the Archbishop of Canterbury, William Temple, asking Temple to find a post for Wand in England. The death of the Bishop of Bath and Wells provided that opportunity. Early in 1943, Wand was offered the see of Bath and Wells, and the family left Brisbane in July the same year.

== Bishop of London ==
Wand was surprisingly translated to London two years later, being interviewed personally by Winston Churchill at a lunch he described in his autobiography. Both appointments caused some dissension since Wand was suspected ‘...of Papish practice, and was roughly handled by Protestant demonstrators at his confirmation ....’

In London post-war difficulties, including the rebuilding of shattered city churches, challenged and revealed Wand's administrative gifts. As bishop, Wand was a privy counsellor; in 1955 he was appointed KCVO; (Note: Despite being a knight, the tradition in Britain is that no cleric bears the title of "Sir".) from 1946 to 57 he was prelate of the Order of the British Empire. He resigned his see as Bishop of London in 1956.

Archbishop Fisher had preceded Wand at London, and was no admirer of Wand, writing after Wand's retirement, ‘Wand had been interested only in certain aspects of diocesan life. It was high time that the Diocese of London was placed in firm hands’. Conversely, the scholarly Canon Charles Smyth wrote of Wand that he, ‘was methodical, patient, shrewd, far-sighted, never complacent, but always cheerful, and physically robust.’ Dean Marcus Wright noted, ‘There was nothing deceitful or ‘smooth’ about him: he was a straight man of integrity and you always knew where you were with him. He was no actor.’ High-powered as Wand was, the human side was expressed through a supply of detective stories read in bed at night and, as a family man, notably Saturday afternoons ‘sacred to the weekly visit to the cinema with Mrs Wand'.

With the Bishop of Fulham Staunton Batty, he supported the early ecumenical movement. He was the first Chairman of the Executive body of the British Council of Churches, attending the 1948 foundation of the World Council of Churches in Amsterdam.

== Seretse Khama affair ==
On 25 September 1948, Seretse Khama, a 27-year-old black African man, and Ruth Williams, a 24-year-old white English woman, went to the Anglican St George's Church in Campden Hill, London, to get married. Half an hour before the service their vicar, the Reverend Leonard Patterson, under severe pressure from various parties opposed to the inter-racial marriage, told the couple he was not willing to perform at the ceremony.

Khama, who was heir to the kingship of the British protectorate of Bechuanaland, and Williams, who was a London insurance clerk, pleaded with Patterson to change his mind, but instead he took them to the nearby St Mary Abbots church in Kensington to meet Wand, who, as Bishop of London, was performing an ordination. There they attempted to gain Wand's consent to be married in the Church of England. However, Wand refused such permission without even speaking to the couple himself, sending the Archdeacon of Middlesex with a message that read: "Get in touch with the Colonial Office. When they agree to the wedding, I will".

Although senior officials at the Colonial Office had no say over whether the couple could get married in a church, or indeed anywhere else, they had made it known through various back channels that they were opposed to the union, not only because they found it distasteful but because they believed that, given Khama's royal status, it would create political difficulties with apartheid South Africa, a neighbouring state to Bechuanaland.

Wand's refusal to sanction a church ceremony forced Khama and Williams to get married in a civil service four days later, at Kensington Registry Office in London.

== Latter years ==
After resigning as bishop, Wand was appointed minor canon and later Canon Treasurer of St Paul's Cathedral, London, until 1969 and edited The Church Quarterly Review. A wide-ranging and facile historian, he wrote forty-five books, among them a History of the Modern Church (1930), History of the Early Church (1937), White of Carpentaria (1949), The Four Great Heresies (1955), Anglicanism in History and Today (1961) and an autobiography, The Changeful Page (1965). Survived by a daughter, Wand died on 16 August 1977 at the College of St Barnabas, Lingfield, Surrey, and was cremated. An obituary in the Church Times paid tribute to his scholarship, administrative genius and unsentimental piety.

== Selected works ==
- A History of the Modern Church from 1500 to the Present Day, 1930.
- A History of the Early Church to A.D. 500, Methuen, 1937.
- The Authority of the Scriptures, Mowbray, 1949.
- What the Church of England Stands For: A Guide to its Authority in the Twentieth Century, Mowbray, 1951.
- The Kingdom of Heaven and its Relation to Social and Cultural Life (1953)
- The Four Great Heresies, Mowbray & Co. Ltd, 1955.
- Seven Steps to Heaven, Longman, Green & Co. Ltd, 1956.
- The Church Today: A brief description of the Christian Church in its external variety and its inner unity, Penguin, 1968.

== Notes ==
Church of England titles
| Preceded by Gerald Sharp | Archbishop of Brisbane; 1934–1943 | Succeeded by Reginald Halse |
| Preceded by Francis Underhill | Bishop of Bath and Wells; 1943–1945 | Succeeded by Harold Bradfield |
| Preceded by Geoffrey Fisher | Bishop of London; 1945–1955 | Succeeded by Henry Montgomery Campbell |
