= Archdiocese of Brisbane =

The Archdiocese of Brisbane may refer to:

- Catholic Archdiocese of Brisbane, Australia
- Anglican Diocese of Brisbane, Australia
