= St Mark's Church, Salisbury =

Church in Salisbury, Wiltshire, England

St Mark's Church
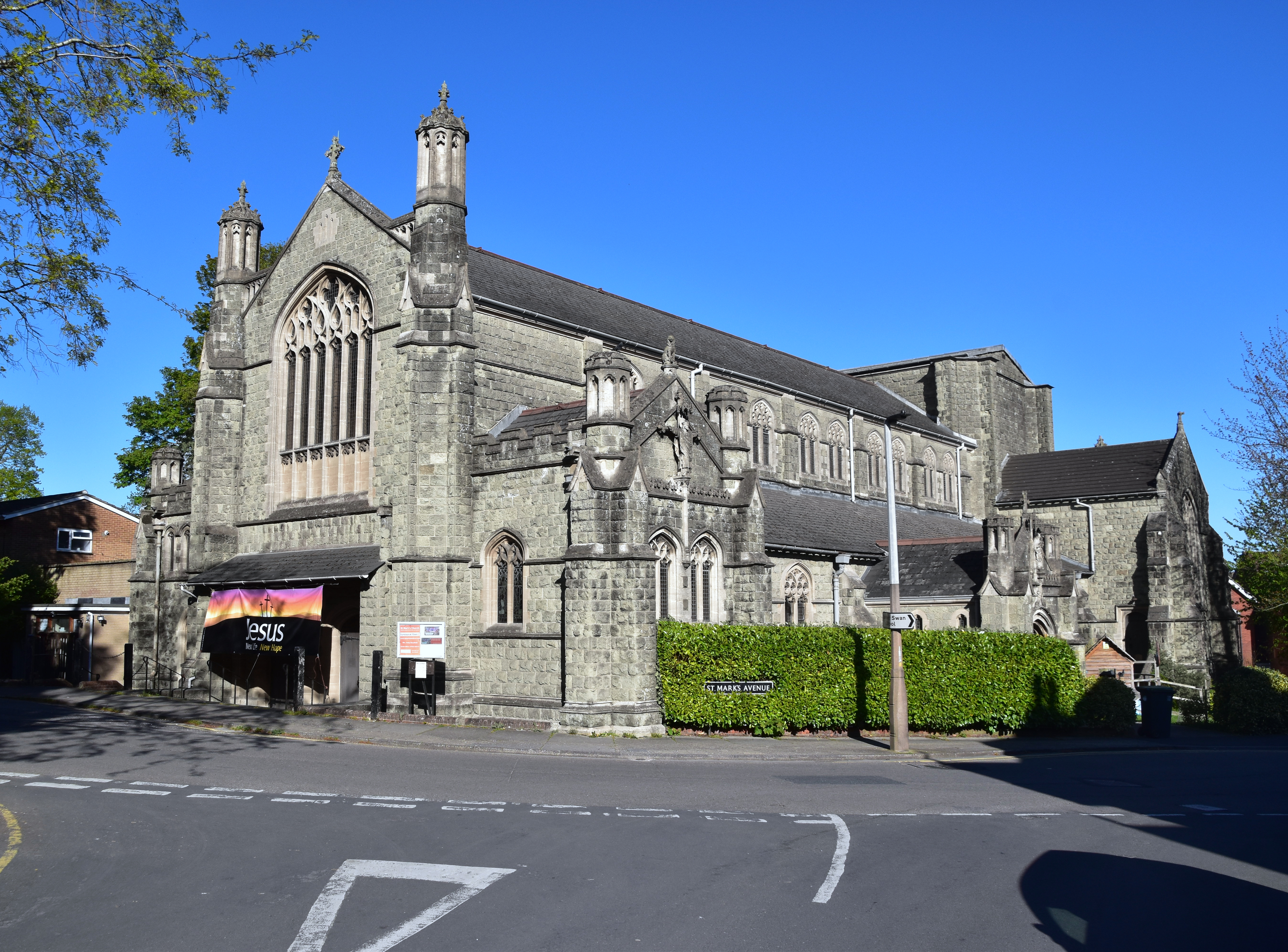
- St Mark's Church in 2026

Religion
- Affiliation: Church of England
- Ecclesiastical or organizational status: Active
- Year consecrated: 1899

Location
- Location: Salisbury, Wiltshire, England
- Interactive map of St Mark's Church
- Coordinates: 51.0752°N 1.7861°W

Architecture
- Architect: Joseph A. Reeve
- Type: Church

St Mark's Church is a Church of England church in Salisbury, Wiltshire, England. It was built in 1892–94 to the designs of Joseph A. Reeve and has been a Grade II listed building since 1974.

== History ==
St Mark's was built to serve the northern part of Salisbury, which at the time was undergoing much residential expansion. The community was originally served by two temporary churches, the first being the mission church of St. Mary Magdalene, established in 1880 at Gigant Street, with 250 sittings. The second church, made of iron, was erected in St Mark's Road in 1882 and able to accommodate 160 persons. As the local population continued to increase, a movement was formed in September 1890, led by the Bishop of Salisbury, Rev. John Wordsworth, for the construction of a permanent church. With a site already offered by the Ecclesiastical Commissioners, a building committee was formed the following month and a number of architects invited to submit their designs, with Joseph A. Reeve's submission being selected.

The foundation stone was laid by the Archbishop of Canterbury, Rev. Edward White Benson, on 27 April 1892, accompanied by the Bishops of Salisbury, St Asaph and Truro. With an estimated cost of £9,000, £2,500 had been raised by the time construction began, prompting the decision to build the church in sections. The first phase, undertaken by Mr. Hayes of Bristol, included the chancel, transepts and one bay of the nave. The work cost £6,500, leaving a debt of £2,700 when the church was dedicated by the Bishop of Salisbury on 28 April 1894.

Once the debt had been cleared, St Mark's was consecrated by the Bishop of Salisbury on 29 April 1899, with assistance from the Bishops of Winchester, Exeter, Bath and Wells, and Bristol, which completed the formation of the district chapelry of St Mark. Construction of the remaining four bays of the nave, plus narthex, was carried out in 1914–15, although the intended upper and ornamental part of the tower was not constructed due to World War I. A memorial chapel was added to the church after the war and the south porch constructed in 1922. An annexe, designed by Moss and Denham of Salisbury, was added in 1969.

== Architecture ==
St Mark's exterior is faced with stone from the Hurdcott quarries, with dressings and window tracery in Doulting stone. The interior uses stone sourced from Corsham Down. The initial phase of work carried out in 1892–94 provided accommodation for 500 persons. The church has a Cruciform plan and is made up of a five-bay nave (with aisles, narthex and flanking spaces), transepts, crossing tower, two-bay chancel with south chapel, south porch, annexe and organ gallery. The chancel retains its original fittings of oak and includes a window designed in 1960 by M. Maybee. The Lady chapel contains stained glass windows designed by Horatio Walter Lonsdale in 1898.

Historic England considers the church's design to be "ambitious" and noted St Mark's importance for its "associations with Bishop John Wordsworth's campaign for the extension of Anglicanism in Salisbury at the end of the 19th century".

== Clergy ==
William Wand was perpetual curate of St Mark's after service in World War I, and subsequently became an Australian Archbishop and later Bishop of London.
