= John Roundhill =

The Right Reverend John Roundhill
- Assistant bishop, Anglican Diocese of Brisbane (Southern Region)
- Church: Anglican Church of Australia
- Diocese: Brisbane
- Installed: 2018
- Other post: Dean of Bendigo (2012–2018)

Orders
- Ordination: 1993 (as deacon); 1994 (as priest)
- Consecration: 2018 by Phillip Aspinall

Personal details
- Born: Leeds
- Denomination: Anglican
- Spouse: Frances
- Children: 2
- Education: University of Cambridge, University of Oxford

John Roundhill is an Australian bishop in the Anglican Church of Australia. He has served as an assistant bishop of the Diocese of Brisbane (Southern Region) since 2018.

Roundhill was a physics teacher in Belize before his ordination as a priest in 1994. Since then he has worked in Lancaster, Scotland, Hong Kong and Australia. Prior to being appointed as bishop, he served as rector of Aspley-Albany Creek, as an area dean, Archdeacon of Lilley and, from 2012 to 2018 as Dean of Bendigo.
