= Peter Hollingworth =

Governor-General of Australia from 2001 to 2003

The Right Reverend and Honourable Peter Hollingworth AC, OBE
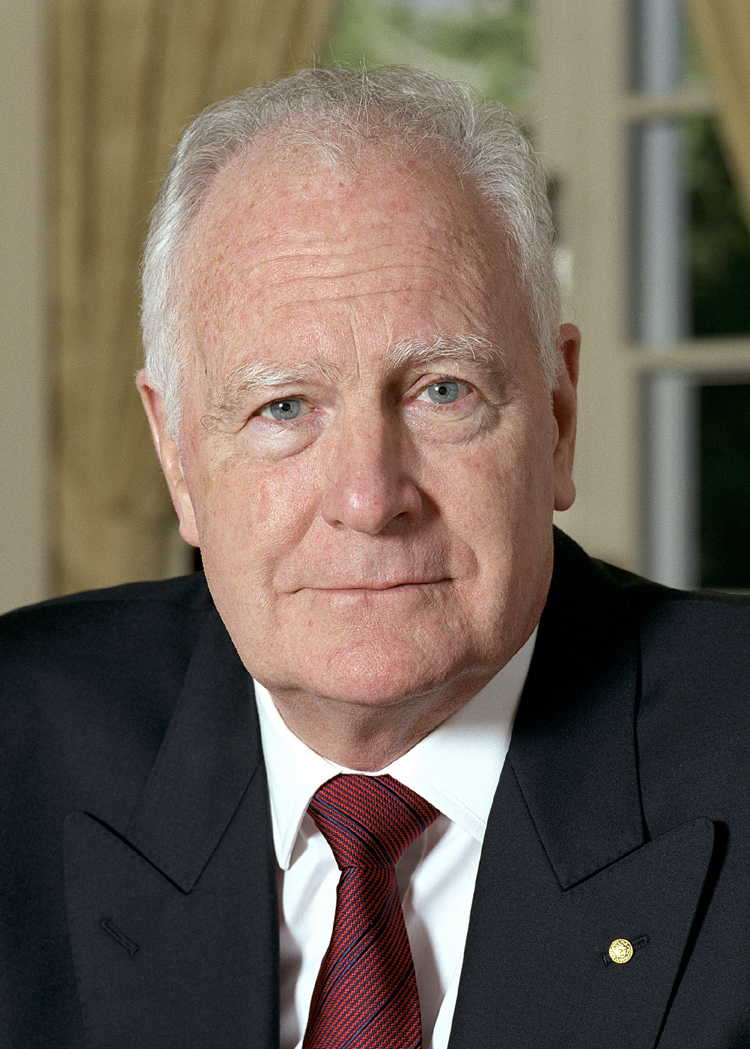

23rd Governor-General of Australia
- In office 29 June 2001 – 29 May 2003
- Monarch: Elizabeth II
- Prime Minister: John Howard
- Preceded by: Sir William Deane
- Succeeded by: Michael Jeffery

Anglican Archbishop of Brisbane
- In office 1990–2001
- Preceded by: John Grindrod
- Succeeded by: Phillip Aspinall

Personal details
- Born: Peter John Hollingworth; 10 April 1935 Adelaide, South Australia
- Died: 19 May 2026 (aged 91) Melbourne, Victoria, Australia
- Spouse: Ann Turner (m. 1960; died 2021)
- Children: 3
- Education: University of Melbourne
- Profession: Bishop

Peter John Hollingworth (10 April 1935 – 19 May 2026) was an Australian bishop who served as Governor-General of Australia from 2001 until his resignation in 2003. He had previously held the position of Anglican Archbishop of Brisbane from 1989 to 2001.

== Early life and education ==
Hollingworth was born on 10 April 1935 in Adelaide, South Australia, to John Hollingworth and Rosaline Geue. His father, an engineer, had grown up in British India and moved to Australia after the First World War, while his mother was from "one of South Australia's pioneering families".

In 1941 the family moved to Melbourne, where Hollingworth's father had been recruited to join the Department of Aircraft Production. They settled in the suburb of East Malvern, where Hollingworth attended Lloyd Street State School and Murrumbeena State School. He later studied at Scotch College in the Melbourne suburb of Hawthorn. He left school at the age of 16 and began a cadetship in the share registry department of the mining company BHP, while also studying accounting at night school.

Hollingworth was conscripted for national service in 1953 and, after basic training at the Royal Australian Air Force base at Point Cook, he began working in the chaplain's office. Having discerned a call to ordained ministry, he enrolled at the University of Melbourne in 1954, residing at Trinity College as a member of its school of theology. He graduated with a Bachelor of Arts degree in 1960, and was also awarded a Licentiate of Theology.

== Career ==
=== Anglican Church of Australia ===
Hollingworth was ordained as a priest in the Anglican Church of Australia in 1960. He became deacon-in-charge and then priest-in-charge of St Mary's church, North Melbourne, in a group ministry of the Anglican inner-city mission within the Melbourne Diocesan Centre. In 1964 he joined the Brotherhood of St Laurence, an independent Anglican welfare organisation, as chaplain and director of youth and children's work, and later became its director of social policy and research. He completed a master's degree in social work and in 1980 was appointed executive director of the Brotherhood of St Laurence, a position he held till 1990.

Hollingworth wrote several books about his work with the poor, which became educational texts. As a public advocate on welfare policy he argued that "poverty should be looked at in terms of the structure of society rather than the individual case."

Hollingworth was elected a canon of St Paul's Cathedral, Melbourne in 1980. Five years later, he was consecrated as Bishop in the Inner City in the Anglican Diocese of Melbourne.

In 1989 Hollingworth was elected as the 8th Archbishop of Brisbane, where he continued his advocacy for the poor and underprivileged and supported the ordination of women. He was chair of the national NGO committee of the International Year of Shelter for the Homeless and was named Australian of the Year in 1991, described as "Australia's foremost spokesman for social justice". He used his public profile to criticise government policy in relation to Aboriginal welfare and youth unemployment. In 1998 he was a delegate to the Australian Constitutional Convention.

=== Governor-General ===
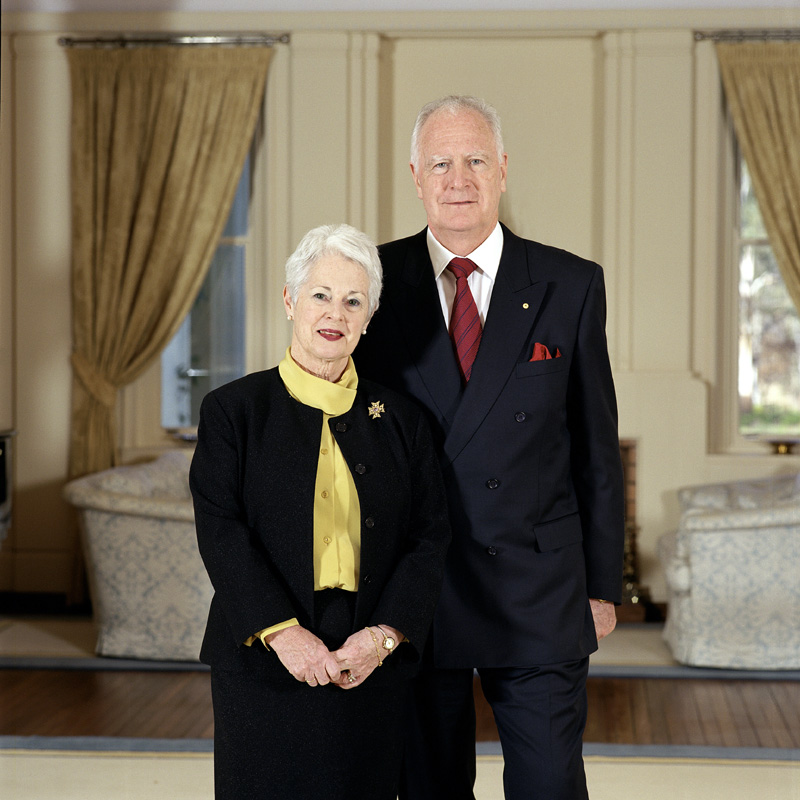
Peter and Ann Hollingworth

On 22 April 2001, the Prime Minister of Australia, John Howard, announced that Queen Elizabeth II had accepted his advice to appoint Hollingworth as Governor-General of Australia upon the completion of Sir William Deane's term. He was the first Christian cleric to hold the post, though precedent existed at a state level, where the Aboriginal pastor Sir Doug Nicholls and the Uniting Church minister Sir Keith Seaman had served as Governor of South Australia and Davis McCaughey had served as Governor of Victoria. On 29 June 2001, Hollingworth was sworn in as Governor-General of the Commonwealth of Australia and Commander-in-Chief of the Defence Force. As the Governor-General is the chancellor and principal companion of the Order of Australia, Hollingworth was appointed a companion of the order on 29 June 2001.

== Controversies ==
=== Resignation ===
In December 2001 allegations were raised that, during his time as Archbishop of Brisbane, Hollingworth had failed to deal appropriately with sex abuse allegations made against a church teacher at Toowoomba Preparatory School. That month, the Anglican Diocese of Brisbane was ordered to pay $834,800 in damages to the woman who had been found to have been sexually abused. Hetty Johnston, an advocate for child sex abuse victims, instigated a campaign calling for Hollingworth to resign. Hollingworth claimed that, as a newly appointed archbishop at the time, he lacked the experience to handle the matter. He also said he had not believed that the case involved sexual abuse, but conceded that he had not done enough to stop abuses occurring. He later apologised to the Toowoomba victim and released a formal statement condemning child sexual abuse, but by February 2002 the opposition Labor Party was calling for him to be dismissed. Hollingworth stepped down from his position as Brisbane Lions No 1 ticket holder and from his roles as patron of Barnardo's, the Kids First Foundation and the National Association for the Prevention of Child Abuse and Neglect.

Phillip Aspinall, Hollingworth's successor as archbishop, ordered an inquiry, which concluded that in 1993 Hollingworth had allowed a known paedophile to continue working as a priest. In May 2003, the report by the Diocese of Brisbane into the handling of the cases was tabled in the Queensland parliament by the Premier of Queensland, Peter Beattie. On 8 May, Hollingworth issued a public statement denying allegations that he himself had raped a woman in the 1960s. Both the deputy prime minister, John Anderson, and the treasurer, Peter Costello, indicated in early May that Hollingworth should consider his position. After meeting with Howard on 11 May, Hollingworth stood aside. On 26 May, he announced his resignation, and his commission as governor-general was revoked on 29 May 2003. Hollingworth was entitled to a pension and other entitlements following his resignation.

=== Sexual abuse inquiry ===
In 2015 and 2016, Hollingworth faced questions as part of the Royal Commission into Institutional Responses to Child Sexual Abuse in regard to his handling of abuse claims while Archbishop of Brisbane. He apologised to victims for not pursuing their claims more rigorously. Like all licensed Anglican clergy, Hollingworth held a Working With Children Check clearance. There was a case to defrock Hollingworth through the Anglican Church's complaints process over allowing an "incurable" paedophile to remain in his position for five years after becoming aware of his abuse of children. Although the tribunal made several findings of misconduct, it described Hollingworth as "fit for ministry" and recommended that he be kept on as a priest, provided that he apologised and was reprimanded. Hollingworth said in May 2023 that he would cease practising as a priest. In 2023, during an investigation by the Victorian government into whether Hollingworth remained fit to hold a Working With Children Check clearance, his lawyer, William "Bill" Doogue, stated that he had not worked with children for some time.

== Honours ==
In 1976 Hollingworth was appointed an officer of the Order of the British Empire (OBE) and in 1988 he was appointed an officer of the Order of Australia for his work in the church and the community. In 2001 he was awarded the Centenary Medal and later the same year was promoted to companion of the Order of Australia upon becoming Governor-General. In 1991 he was named Australian of the Year and was included in the inaugural list of Australian Living Treasures in 1997.

On 21 May 2001, Hollingworth was awarded the Lambeth degree of Doctor of Letters (DLitt) by the Archbishop of Canterbury, George Carey, in recognition of his research, publications, teaching and achievements in the fields of Christian social ethics, social welfare and poverty studies and episcopal leadership. He also received a number of honorary doctorates from Australian universities, such as Doctor of Laws from Monash University in 1986.

== Personal life and death ==
On 6 February 1960, Hollingworth married Kathleen Ann Turner (d. 2021), an obstetric physiotherapist, whom he had met on national service. They had three daughters.

Hollingworth died on 19 May 2026 at the age of 91, following a long illness.

== Publications ==
- Hollingworth, Peter (1972), The powerless poor: a comprehensive guide to poverty in Australia, Stockland Press, ISBN 978-0-909474-07-2
- Scott, David; Hollingworth, Peter (1974), The waiting poor: an argument for abolition of the waiting period on unemployment and sickness benefits, The Brotherhood of St. Laurence, ISBN 978-0-909571-21-4
- Hollingworth, Peter (1975), The poor: victims of affluence, Pitman, ISBN 978-0-85896-445-7
- Barry, Romuald; Hally, Cyril; Hollingworth, Peter (1978), The Australian religious and poverty, Society of St. Paul, ISBN 978-0-909986-55-1
- Hollingworth, Peter (1979), Australians in poverty, Thomas Nelson (Australia), ISBN 978-0-17-005241-2
- Hollingworth, Peter (1981), Christianity and social order: from Maurice to Temple and beyond, Companions of St. Laurence, ISBN 978-0-9594389-0-1
- Hollingworth, Peter (1987), Be it ever so humble there's no place like home: the seventh G. T. Sambell memorial oration, G. T. Sambell Memorial Trust, ISBN 978-0-947081-14-0
- Hollingworth, Peter (1991), Kingdom come!: meditations and studies for Lent and other times, Anglican Information Office, ISBN 978-0-949108-75-3
- Hollingworth, Peter (1996), Public thoughts of an archbishop, Corporation of the Synod of the Diocese of Brisbane, ISBN 978-1-875650-93-4
- Hollingworth, Peter; Comben, Lyn (1999), Memories of bush ministry and the challenge of the future, Anglican Diocese of Brisbane, ISBN 978-0-646-38068-1

Anglican Communion titles
Preceded by John Grindrod	Archbishop of Brisbane; 1990–2001	Succeeded by Phillip Aspinall
Government offices
Preceded by William Deane	Governor-General of Australia; 2001–2003	Succeeded by Michael Jeffery
Honorary titles
Preceded by Fred Hollows	Australian of the Year; 1991	Succeeded by Mandawuy Yunupingu
