= Mathew Hale (bishop) =

Australian bishop (1811–1895)

The Right Reverend Mathew Hale
- Bishop of Brisbane
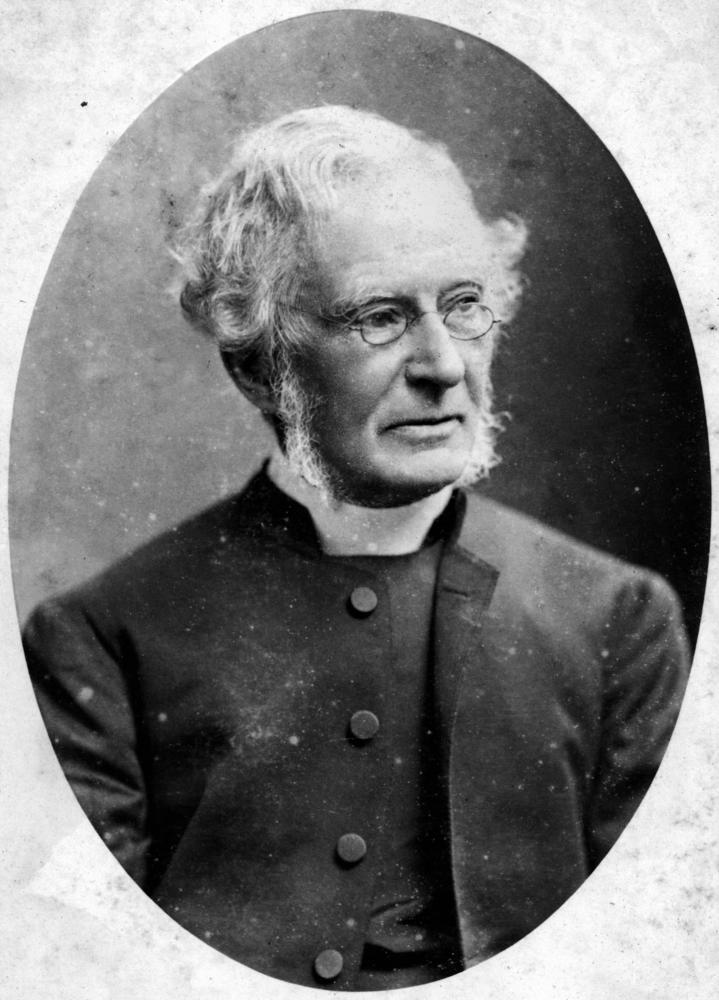
- Hale in 1875
- Church: Church of England
- Diocese: Brisbane
- In office: 1875–1885
- Predecessor: Edward Tufnell
- Successor: William Webber
- Previous posts: Bishop of Perth; (1857–1875); Archdeacon of Adelaide

Personal details
- Born: Mathew Blagden Hale; 18 August 1811 Alderley, Gloucestershire
- Died: 3 April 1895 (aged 83) Clifton, Bristol
- Denomination: Anglican
- Parents: Robert H. Blagden Hale; Lady Theodosia, née Bourke
- Spouse: Sophia, née Clode (m. 1840; died 1845) Sabina, née Molloy (m. 1848)
- Children: 5 sons, 3 daughters
- Education: Wotton-under-Edge; Trinity College, Cambridge

Mathew Blagden Hale (Note: Spelling Mathew with one t is a family tradition going back to the 16th century. Sir Mathew Hale, the distinguished 17th century English judge, was an ancestor of Bishop Hale.) (18 June 1811 – 3 April 1895), very frequently spelled "Matthew", was the first Anglican bishop of Perth and then the Anglican bishop of Brisbane.

Hale is recognised for seeking to empower the South Australian Aboriginals through his work in the Poonindie mission, establishing the Anglican Diocese of Perth and Hale School.

== Early life ==
Mathew Blagden Hale was born on 18 June 1811 at Alderley, Gloucestershire, the third son of Robert H. Blagden Hale (5 May 1780 – 20 December 1855) and Lady Theodosia Hale (née Bourke). His maternal grandfather was The Earl of Mayo, Lord Archbishop of Tuam. After completing his education at Wotton-under-Edge, he attended Trinity College, Cambridge, and obtained his B.A. in 1835 and M.A. in 1838. During his time at Cambridge he met Harold Browne and they became lifelong friends. Both came under the influence of Charles Simeon who celebrated fifty years of evangelical ministry at (Holy) Trinity Church in 1832. The antislavery movement driven by William Wilberforce also influenced Hale and he wanted to minister to the newly emancipated slaves, particularly in the West Indies, but was not encouraged to do so neither by his family nor by the missionary society working in that region. Hale was ordained a deacon in the Church of England in 1836, and priest in 1837 by the Bishop of Bristol and Gloucester. From 1836 to 1838 he was curate of Tresham. In 1838 he acted as curate of Wootton-under-Edge, then from 1839 to 1845 Perpetual Curate of Stroud, an expanding woollen-cloth manufacturing centre in Gloucestershire. In 1840 Hale married Sophia Clode, with whom he would have three children, the eldest of whom died in infancy. Sophia died in early 1845 followed by Hale's mother a few months later. Hale had an emotional breakdown and resigned. Subsequently, he served briefly as Rector of Alderley in 1845 and 1846, and then as Perpetual Curate of Atworth with Wraxhill in 1846 and 1847.

== South Australia ==
In 1847 he met Bishop Short at a friend's house, and was persuaded to accompany him to Adelaide. Hale, with his two surviving daughters and two servants in late December 1847 arrived in South Australia, where he was appointed first Archdeacon of Adelaide. The following year during a pastoral visit to Western Australia with Bishop Short he married Sabina, eldest daughter of John and Georgiana Molloy. Subsequently, after Hale returned to Adelaide, he was appointed the first rector of St Matthew's church at Kensington.

In early 1850 Hale approached the Governor of South Australia proposing an institution for young Aborigines where they would live in one little community to learn practical skills in farming and domestic arts and to receive Christian teaching. Later that year he volunteered his services as mission superintendent. His offer was accepted and the Natives' Training Institution was opened at Poonindie, near Port Lincoln, in October 1850. Hale and his family moved to Poonindie soon afterwards and Mathew and Sabina's eldest surviving son, Mathew, was born there in July next year. The Institution prospered and when Bishop Short visited in February 1853, there were 54 Aborigines resident, eleven of whom were baptised by the Bishop.

== Western Australia ==
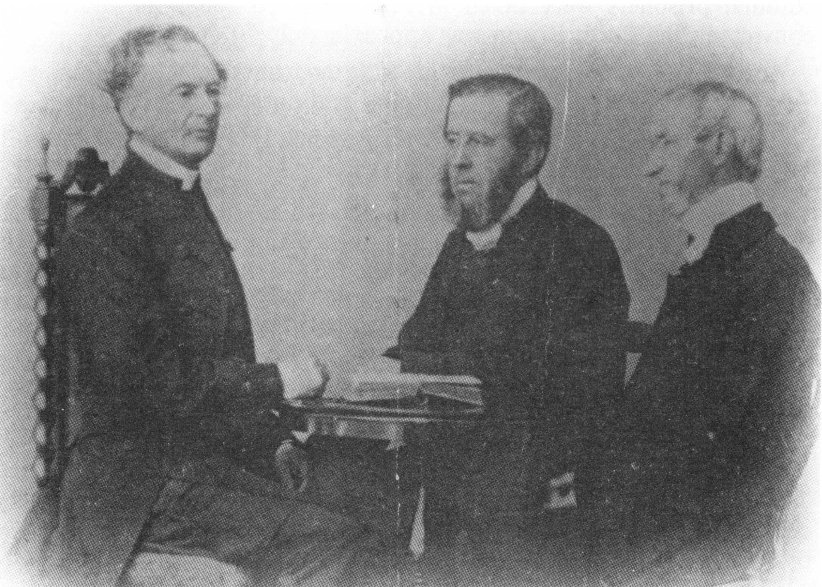
Bishop Hale, Archdeacon Brown, Rev. W. Mitchell at the Swan River Colony

In 1856, Hale resigned to accept an invitation to serve as Bishop of Perth. In July 1856 he arrived in Western Australia on the Guyon, which had diverted to Port Lincoln to pick him up, along with his two eldest daughters and sister-in-law Georgiana Molloy, and in November the rest of his family arrived there from South Australia. In March 1857, Hale returned to England with his family, where on 25 July 1857 he was consecrated as the first Bishop of Perth at the Lambeth Palace Chapel. The sermon was preached by Hale's longtime friend from their university days, Harold Browne. According to its usual custom Cambridge University awarded the new bishop an honorary Doctor of Divinity degree. While Hale accepted this academic honour, he was reluctant to adopt the style and title of "My Lord", maintaining that as a colonial bishop he would be better without it. However, the legal authorities ruled that he must accept it and he did so.

Leaving his family in England, Hale returned to Western Australia on the convict ship Nile early in 1858, to take up office as Bishop of Perth. It had been an eventful and dangerous voyage. The problems arising from transportation were evident when Hale had made his initial tour of his diocese-to-be and he had prepared a report on The Transportation Question, advocating measures to make Western Australia a reformatory colony rather than a penal settlement. This was published while he was in England. Hale's report demanded change in the colony's penal system. When copies reached Perth before he returned from England, there was a storm of criticism in the local news media, claiming that Hale's report was "full of misrepresentations and errors". However, when Hale's own account of his voyage on Nile and the behavior of the convicts on it was published, he was vindicated and newspaper editors were commending Hale, even as the Colonial Governor was disapproving because of "embarrassment to Her Majesty's Government".

In June 1858, after he returned from England, Hale opened a boys' school for both boarders and day pupils. The Bishop's School was modelled after England's public schools. Many of the pupils who attended it came from leading families in the colony; many of them went on to become prominent in Western Australian business and politics. Hale had continuing problems in finding suitable schoolmasters and funds to support his school. Eventually this proved too much for him and the Bishop's School closed on 1 March 1872. However it continued on under different management and eventually became today's Hale School. Bishop Hale is generally recognised as the pioneer of secondary education in Western Australia.

Communications with the eastern colonies and England were made by sailing ship when Hale arrived in the colony in 1856 and by steamship when he left in 1875. Albany was the first port of call on the Australian continent. Hence Hale was the first Australian bishop to receive his invitation to the first Lambeth Conference held in 1867 and was the only one to attend it.

In 1870 a crisis arose when the lady running an orphanage for indigenous children in Albany was unable to continue this work. Hale decided to resign as bishop, apply for the vacant chaplaincy at Albany, and carry on this orphanage work himself. As soon as his intention to resign became known in Perth, a large deputation from the Protestant community called on Hale and persuaded him to withdraw it. In explaining his intentions to his friends Hale reminded them that "I have no hesitation in saying that a European population disregarding the welfare of the natives, whom it has displaced from their country, will not ensure God's blessing and therefore I do hope that the public generally will support the Mission at Albany."

In July 1871 Hale met with his clergy and laity to draw up the constitution for a diocesan synod and the first synod was held in Perth in August 1872. He opened this synod with a significant sermon, Being all things to all men on the responsibilities of both individual Christians and the church in their relationships with the world.

=== Leaving ===
Hale was Bishop of Perth until 1875. On 5 April that year he received letters from Bishop Barker of Sydney and Bishop Short of Adelaide asking for his consent to be nominated as second Bishop of Brisbane. He was reluctant to accept this new responsibility, since he was in his mid sixties and looking forward to retirement in a few years time, and did so only on the condition that he had the unanimous support of all the Australian bishops.

There was a public farewell to Hale on 30 October 1875 at which an address from the congregation of St George's Cathedral and members of other Christian communions was read. Hale's ministry and influence in Western Australia had not been confined to the Anglican Church but involved active co-operation with other Christian groups in matters of common interest. In particular the Congregationalists commended him for originating and fostering "institutions for promoting the moral and religious welfare of the community" and for his "truly missionary spirit". They were pleased that he was always ready to contend for the truth "as it is in Jesus, ..." They attributed the "truly evangelical and peaceful character of his episcopate to his true love for the Bible, the word of God; ... ." They also recognised his "hearty co-operation with others" not belonging to his church, concluding that they united with members of his church and all Protestant fellow colonists, in praying for his future welfare, peace and happiness.

The bishop acknowledged each address, thanking "his dear friends" for their very kind words, sometimes suggesting that his own contribution was not as much as stated, other times reminding "his Sons and Daughters in the Lord Jesus Christ" to whom he had ministered, that "... my sole aim in my teaching has been to set forth faithfully and simply the blessed truths which are to be found in God's Holy Word". He also referred to the "mutual kindness and good will which exists between members of the different religious bodies in this country who hold to those great Scriptural doctrines which were ... brought to light a second time at the period of the Reformation, and which are to us more precious than rubies". In concluding his various replies he asked for their prayers for him in his difficult new task and assured them of his continuing prayers and interest in their affairs.

The editors of the local newspapers were lavish in their praise of the departing bishop. The Western Australian Times' farewell editorial began with the words "We admire great men and give genius its due need of fame, but the good man gains not only our admiration but our hearts ... After outlining Hale's many contributions to the life of the colony the editorial concluded with the following commendation of Hale "He has shown us what a true christian pastor can do, and how the holding of a high and honoured office is not inconsistent with a brotherly bearing towards all, and that a helping hand and a kind word, go more to make up real christianity, than austere looks, and obstinate theories; and without disparagement of others, we fear we may say that 'take him all in all we'll never see his like again'."

The Perth Inquirer in its valedictory tribute commented "There are few individuals among the more conspicuous leaders of any religious community upon whom suspicion ....... has never breathed its taint. Bishop Hale is one of those few".

Hale not only left the people of Perth with much goodwill and positive memories of his ministry, he also presented to the church the bishop's house and grounds which were his own private property. The value of these and other money given by him while he was in Western Australia probably totaled nearly £A10,000 - about A$1,000,000 in current (2014) value.

== Queensland ==
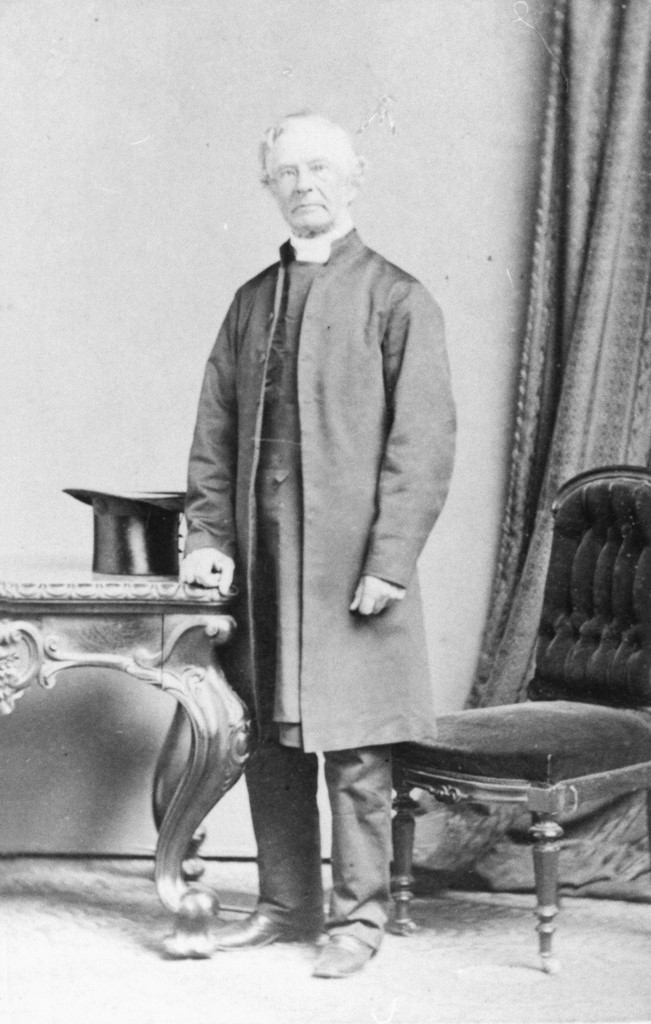
Hale in his later years

Hale received an enthusiastic welcome when he was installed as second Bishop of Brisbane in St John's Pro-Cathedral on 15 December 1875. In his first address to his new flock Hale made it clear that he had been brought to Queensland to deal with the problem of providing ministry to people in vast areas of country where there were no churches or clergymen. He would be powerless to do anything about it because of his lack of resources; resources, which in the absence of any state aid for religion in the colony, only could come from the freewill offerings of established congregations and individuals.

To deal with this lack of resources the General Church Fund was launched at a meeting in Brisbane on the evening of 23 March 1876. It was intended that each congregation in the diocese would contribute to the fund by passing on to the Diocesan Council the money received from weekly offerings on two Sundays every year. At the same time direct contributions were to be solicited from individuals to build up the capital sum. Hale himself was disappointed that some of the speeches at the meeting did not indicate a sense of "the importance and the gravity of the matter which we met together to discuss". His opinion was supported by the lack of donations received.

Hale toured his region widely. He hoped and devoutly prayed that his visits from place to place would serve to bind Church of England people in the colony more closely together. Hale's determined goal was to see the church "act more in concert one with another than we have done". We must realise "that we are all one body, united in our blessed Lord and Master, Jesus Christ, as to one Head, being all members one of another, as members of His body". Hale felt the concern of the present period of commercial depression, commenting "That which hinders the performance of good works and holds people back from making adequate offerings to God, is very rarely the real inability to give. The hindrance arises in almost all cases from the want of a proper estimate of what is really owing to God, and from the weakness of men's faith ....... "

Twelve months after Hale had arrived in Brisbane what had been given to the fund so far was completely inadequate. Hale felt that this situation indicated that his coming to Brisbane had been a mistake and so in January 1877 he submitted his resignation to Bishop Barker. After intervention by Bishop Barker, the people and churches in Brisbane were shamed into a commitment to support the General Church Fund and Hale withdrew his resignation. Nevertheless, despite Hale's generous personal donations, the funds received were never sufficient to meet the needs.

At the second General Synod in Sydney in October 1876 Hale was appointed President of the Executive Council of the Board of Missions (later the Australian Board of Missions). In July 1878, with Hale's encouragement, the Brisbane Synod established a Clergy Superannuation and Widows and Orphans Fund, while in the following year, after discussions between Hale and Bishop Barker, Synod recognised the establishment of the Diocese of North Queensland. In October 1881, as the senior bishop attending, Hale presided over the third General Synod in Sydney. Subsequently, he was involved in the negotiations which led to the appointment of Alfred Barry as Bishop of Sydney. In April 1884 he welcomed Barry and participated in his installation in Sydney.

A mark of Hale's ministry in Brisbane as in Perth was his association with members of other Christian churches in causes of common interest. He presided at annual meetings of the local auxiliary of the Bible Society; he addressed a large gathering of Sunday school children in the Brisbane Botanic Gardens in May 1884; he identified himself with the Social Purity Society and its lobbying to change legislation that controlled prostitution; he laid the foundation stones for the Loyal Orange Institution's New Protestant Hall in Ann Street and for the Lutheran Church in Wickham Terrace; he supported the YMCA, having chaired its inaugural meeting in December 1882, and also the work of Temperance societies concerned with the abuse of alcohol, as well as the Society for the Prevention of Cruelty to Animals.

The Bishop was farewelled on 19 March 1885 at a public gathering in the Exhibition Building, Bowen Hills by 700 to 800 people - Church of England, Presbyterian, Wesleyan, Lutheran, Scandinavian, Primitive Methodist, Congregational and Baptist. The Baptist Association in its farewell address had commended him for "true catholicity" and faithfulness to the principles of his own church. Hale responded "There are in existence here evils of fearful magnitude, .... which are threatening to eat into the very heart of the social and domestic happiness of this community. By making common cause with others, and by working heartily with them, I may have been, I trust, through God's mercy, able to do at least something towards checking these evils".

The Fortitude Valley branch of the Church of England Temperance Society concisely expressed its appraisal of Hale's ministry. "Your many acts of unostentatious charity, the ready help which you have always given to the promotion of evangelical religion, the generous sympathy which you have ever displayed in the cause of temperance, and the liberal and consistent spirit of Christianity which has characterised your Episcopate, have greatly endeared you to all classes of men among whom you have diligently laboured".

The Toowoomba Chronicle was forthright in its commendation of Hale's goodness and openness to cooperation with others and scathing of those Anglicans who refused to follow his example. "That the Church of England has not progressed during the past decade in the same ratio as the population is not the Bishop's fault. He has had to exercise episcopal functions in a diocese divided against 'itself.' ...... The evangelical breadth of the Bishop has overstrained the unelastic charity of a few of the clergy".

The Chronicle's editorial ended with an appreciation of Sabina Hale's contribution to social work in the community, referring particularly to her good relationships with all the other ladies she had worked with, both Anglicans and those of "other religious persuasions".

== Return to England ==
Bishop Hale and his wife left Brisbane for Sydney on 27 March 1885. Four days later he handed his resignation letter to the Primate, Bishop Barry. Hale and his family sailed for England via Colombo in the P&O mail steamer Thames on 2 May. After changing ships they arrived in England on 14 July. Hale lived in retirement at Clifton, Bristol, where he died on 3 April 1895. He was buried in the churchyard at Alderley, Gloucestershire. He was survived by his second wife Sabina, five sons and three daughters.

== Legacy ==
- 2004: The Mathew Hale Public Library was established in Brisbane.
- 2005: St Matthew's church at Poonindie was reopened after restoration on the 150th anniversary of its completion by Mathew Hale.
- 2008: In March a statue of Hale by Greg James was erected outside The Cloisters, the building Hale built to house his school, in central Perth.

== Sources ==
- Gourlay, M. R. (2015). The Good Bishop: the story of Mathew Hale. Brisbane: Mathew Hale Public Library Brisbane & Boolarong Press. ISBN 9781925046533.
- Rayner, Keith (1962). The History of the Church of England in Queensland (PDF) (PhD thesis). St Lucia, Queensland: University of Queensland. Archived from the original on 17 February 2017.
- Robin, A. de Q. (1976). Mathew Blagden Hale: the life of an Australian pioneer bishop. Melbourne: Hawthorn Press. ISBN 0725601671. LCCN 77362808. OCLC 3311377. OL 4599935M.

Anglican Communion titles
New office	Bishop of Perth; 1857–1875	Succeeded by Henry Parry
Preceded by Edward Tufnell	Bishop of Brisbane; 1875–1885	Succeeded by William Webber
