= Anglican Diocese of Brisbane =

Diocese in Queensland, Australia

Coordinates: 27°27′50.99″S 153°01′46.53″E

Diocese of Brisbane
- Coat of arms

Location
- Country: Australia
- Territory: South East Queensland; Darling Downs South West; Wide Bay–Burnett; (Southern part)
- Ecclesiastical province: Queensland
- Metropolitan: Archbishop of Brisbane
- Headquarters: St Martins House; 373 Ann Street; Brisbane

Information
- Denomination: Anglican
- Rite: Book of Common Prayer; An Australian Prayer Book; A Prayer Book for Australia
- Established: 1858; 168 years ago
- Cathedral: St John's Cathedral, Brisbane
- Language: English

Current leadership
- Parent church: Anglican Church of Australia
- Archbishop: Jeremy Greaves
- Assistant bishops: Cameron Venables; (Western Region since 2014); Jeremy Greaves; (Northern Region since 2017); John Roundhill; (Southern Region since 2018)
- Dean: Peter Catt; (since 2008)

Website
- anglicanchurchsq.org.au
- Anglican Diocese of Brisbane
- Logo of the Diocese

The Anglican Diocese of Brisbane, also known as Anglican Church Southern Queensland, is based in Brisbane, Queensland, Australia. The diocesan bishop's seat is at St John's Cathedral, Brisbane. The diocese stretches from the south-eastern coastline of Queensland, down to the New South Wales border and west to the Northern Territory and South Australian borders. The diocese currently markets itself as "Anglican Church Southern Queensland" (ACSQ). The "Anglicare Southern Queensland" brand is also heavily promoted by the diocese.

The current Archbishop of Brisbane is Jeremy Greaves.

The current assistant bishops are Cameron Venables (Bishop of the Western Region since 2014), John Roundhill (Southern Region since 2018) and Sarah Plowman (Assistant Bishop, Diocese of Brisbane and Bishop for the Northern Region from 2024). On 1 September 2023, Greaves was elected as the next archbishop, and was installed in that position on 16 December 2023.

== History ==
In 1858, the Brisbane diocese was separated from the Diocese of Newcastle. Until then, the area had been under the jurisdiction of the Bishop of Newcastle, William Tyrrell.

In 1859, Queen Victoria appointed the diocese's first bishop, Edward Tufnell (1814–1896). Tufnell designated St John's Cathedral in Brisbane as the pro-cathedral. The central stained glass windows in the apse were donated by Bishop Tufnell. In 1866, there was one archdeaconry: Benjamin Glennie was Archdeacon of Brisbane.

The second bishop was Matthew Hale, who was translated from Perth in 1876. Hale was succeeded by William Webber.

With the creation of the Province of Queensland in 1905, the Diocese of Brisbane became the permanent metropolitan see and its bishop the metropolitan archbishop.

=== Bishopsbourne ===
A bishops' house called Bishopsbourne (now Old Bishopsbourne) was built in Milton c. 1865 for Edward Tufnell. It was used by subsequent bishops and archbishops until Archbishop Philip Strong purchased the house Eldernell (formerly Farsley) at 39 Eldernell Street, Hamilton, in 1964, renaming it Bishopsbourne.

In April 2007, then Archbishop Phillip Aspinall sold the Hamilton residence for $11.2 million and moved to a residence in Ascot costing $2.6 million, which has also been renamed Bishopsbourne.

== Episcopate ==
=== Archbishops of Brisbane ===
Bishops of Brisbane
From	Until	Incumbent	Notes
1859	1874	Edward Tufnell	
1875	1885	Matthew Hale	Translated from Perth.
1885	1903	William Webber	Died in office.
1904	1905	St Clair Donaldson	Became Archbishop of Brisbane
Archbishops of Brisbane
From	Until	Incumbent	Notes
1905	1921	St Clair Donaldson	Translated to Salisbury.
1921	1933	Gerald Sharp	Died in office.
1934	1943	William Wand	Translated to Bath and Wells and later to London.
1943	1962	Reginald Halse	Translated from Riverina; knighted in 1962; died in office.
1963	1970	Philip Strong	Translated from New Guinea; Primate of Australia, 1966–1970.
(1970)	(1970)		Frank Coaldrake, Chairman of the Australian Board of Missions was elected Archbishop in 1970, but died before being consecrated and taking office.
1970	1980	Felix Arnott	Previously coadjutor bishop in Melbourne.
1980	1989	John Grindrod	Previously Bishop of Riverina and then of Rockhampton; Primate of Australia, 1982–1989; knighted in 1983.
1990	2001	Peter Hollingworth	Translated from the Inner City, Melbourne; Governor-General of Australia, 2001–2003.
2002	2022	Phillip Aspinall	Previously assistant bishop in Adelaide; Primate of Australia, 2005–2014.
2023	present	Jeremy Greaves	Previously assistant bishop for the northern region in Brisbane.

=== Assistant bishops ===
The first co-adjutor bishop for the Brisbane diocese was John Francis Stretch, who was consecrated at St Paul's cathedral in Melbourne in November, 1895. Stretch was the first Australian to be made a bishop for ministry in Australia (and his consecration service was only the second occasion that such a service had happened in Australia at that time). Among the previous assistant bishops of the Diocese of Brisbane were: Henry Le Fanu (bishop coadjutor), who became Archbishop of Perth and Primate of Australia; De Witt Batty (coadjutor, 1930–1931); Horace Henry Dixon (consecrated 29 March 1932 at St John's; coadjutor, 1932–1961); John Hudson served as coadjutor bishop from 1961; Ralph Wicks was consecrated 27 July 1973; Adrian Charles and Bruce Schultz were consecrated on 1 March 1983; George Browning was assistant bishop for the Northern Region, 1985–1992, then for the Coastal Region until he became Bishop of Canberra and Goulburn in 1993; John Noble and Ron Williams were consecrated on 29 June 1993 — Noble served the Northern Region until his 2002 election to North Queensland, and Williams served the Southern until 2007; Ray Smith, Archdeacon of the Downs (Raymond Bruce Smith, not Raymond George Smith) was consecrated 1 November 1996 to serve as assistant bishop for the Western Region; Rob Nolan was consecrated bishop on 27 June 2003 and served the Western Region until 2014; and John Parkes who became the Bishop of Wangaratta. Alison Taylor served as Bishop of the Southern Region from 2013 to 2017 and Sarah Plowman was appointed Bishop of the Northern Region from 2024.

The current assistant bishops are Cameron Venables (Bishop of the Western Region since 2014), Sarah Plowman (Northern Region since 2024) and John Roundhill (Southern Region since 2018).

Bishops Coadjutor and Diocesan-wide Assistant Bishops
From	Until	Incumbent	Notes
1889	1892	Nathaniel Dawes	Coadjutor Bishop for Brisbane; Translated to Rockhampton.
1895	1900	John Francis Stretch	Coadjutor Bishop for Brisbane; Translated to Newcastle (as bishop-coadjutor; Bishop of Newcastle from 1906).
1915	1929	Henry Le Fanu	Coadjutor Bishop for Brisbane; Translated to Perth. Later Primate of Australia.
1930	1931	Francis De Witt Batty	Coadjutor Bishop for Brisbane (also Dean of Brisbane from 1925 to 1931); Translated to Newcastle.
1930	1961	Horace Henry Dixon	Coadjutor Bishop for Brisbane.
1961	1973	Wilfred John Hudson	Coadjutor Bishop for Brisbane. Translated from Carpentaria.
1973	1978	Ralph Edwin Wicks	Coadjutor Bishop for Brisbane. Translated to Southern, then Western Regions.
Assistant bishops (Northern Region)
From	Until	Incumbent	Notes
1983	1985	Bruce Schultz	Translated to Grafton.
1985	1993	George Browning	Translated to Canberra & Goulburn.
1993	1999	John Noble	Appointed Assistant Bishop and Director of Ministry Education, 1999–2002; Later Bishop of North Queensland (2002–2007)
1999	2006	Richard Appleby	Translated from the Northern Territory. Subsequently, appointed as Bishop Assisting the Primate of Australia.
2006	2016	Jonathan Holland	Appointed Assistant Bishop and Director of Ministry Education, 2016–present
2017		Jeremy Greaves	Previously Dean of Darwin
2024	present	Sarah Plowman	Mission Chaplain, Director of Discernment and Formation and Honorary Canon, St John's Cathedral from 2021
Assistant bishops (Southern Region)
From	Until	Incumbent	Notes
2013	2017	Alison Taylor	First female bishop in the diocese. Appointed as Member of the Order of Australia in 2023.
Assistant bishops (Western Region)
From	Until	Incumbent	Notes

== Saint John's Cathedral ==
The Cathedral of Saint John was completed in 2005, after 100 years of construction.

In 2015, a series of statues, costing $45,000 each according to the ABC, were purchased and blessed by Archbishop Aspinall before being installed on the cathedral's facade.

Shortly before this, a storm warped one of the cathedral's walls, causing millions of dollars' worth of damage.

== Theological training ==
Clergy trained in a variety of colleges and seminaries are active in the diocese. Those trained within it attend Saint Francis' Theological College, an affiliate of Charles Sturt University. The principal of the college is Bishop Jonathan Holland.

A motion put to the 2017 synod that would have allowed diocesan ordinands to study at the more evangelical Brisbane School of Theology, a historic "Bible college", was not carried.

== Churchmanship ==
The diocese has a dominant liberal Anglo-Catholic ethos. Religious orders such as the Society of Saint Francis and the Oratory of the Good Shepherd have made Brisbane their Australian base. The Society of the Sacred Advent was also founded in the city.

According to the diocesan handbook, in keeping with the Anglo-Catholic nature of the diocese clergy must always wear a stole over the cassock or alb when celebrating the Eucharist (plain clothes or business suits are not allowed).

Archbishop Phillip Aspinall is a liberal Anglo-Catholic of the Affirming Catholicism school and gave the keynote address at the Australian Church Union's 2006 Keble Mass.

Despite the dominant liberal Anglo-Catholic ethos, there are a handful of low church parishes in a few of Brisbane's southern suburbs, such as Coorparoo. However the diocese's Anglo-Catholic orientation has rarely been questioned.

== Lobby groups ==
The former dean of the cathedral, Peter Catt, is the founder of A Progressive Christian Voice and is, according to the Brisbane Times, an advocate for same-sex marriage. He also chairs the diocese's social responsibilities committee. Catt resigned as Dean of the Cathedral in September 2026.

The Angligreen environmental group is also a significant voice in the diocese.

== Issues ==
=== Biblical literacy ===
Archbishop Aspinall observed that "Few Anglicans in Brisbane have any depth of knowledge of the Bible; few read or study the Bible regularly ..."

=== Transgender priests ===
Archbishop Aspinall supported English-born Brisbane priest and Saint Francis' lecturer, Josephine Inkpin, when she came out as Australia's first openly-transgender priest. Aspinall's letter indicated he was aware "there are further transgender people involved in our wider diocesan life." Inkpin's wife, Penny Jones, was one of the first female priests in the United Kingdom. In 2020, Archbishop Aspinall supported another priest, Selina McMahon, in her transition. The State Library of Queensland interviewed Josephine Inkpin and her wife Penny about the intersection of gender, faith, religion and identity for their Dangerous Women podcast.

=== Same sex marriage ===
According to the Courier Mail, in 2015 the diocese's social responsibilities committee endorsed same-sex civil unions.

A large number of priests in the diocese publicly support same-sex marriage. In 2022, St. John's Cathedral announced that it would offer blessings for same-sex unions.

=== Reintegration of convicted child abusers ===
According to the Courier Mail and Brisbane Times, two convicted child sexual abuser priests attended church, perform lay reader duties and worked in a choir with children at Holy Trinity Church, Fortitude Valley. This led to public outcry. Although defrocked, "they were later allowed to keep reading to the congregation as what's known as a lector." The matter was referred to the diocese's professional standards board.

=== State-church relationship ===
==== Links to the military ====
According to an academic paper by Jonathan Holland, Archbishop Philip Strong had opposed 13 other bishops from around the country who had spoken out against Australia's involvement in the Vietnam War. Archbishop Strong had argued for National Service and vigorously defended Australia's support of America in Vietnam on the grounds that "Conflict at the right time and in the right place may serve the cause of ultimate world peace." At the same time, the priest in charge of the Chermside parish sought to dismiss curates who took a Christian pacifist stance.

==== Links to the legal community ====
According to the ABC, the diocese has close links to the legal establishment in Brisbane. This has led to public concerns about a serious conflict of interest.

=== All Saint's Brisbane ===
A conservative Anglo-Catholic parish, All Saints' Brisbane, joined the Forward in Faith movement in protest over the issue of the ordination of women and the diocese's refusal to provide alternative episcopal oversight. Archbishop Aspinall suspended the priest in charge of the parish, David Chislett, after he was consecrated as a bishop by the Traditional Anglican Communion. In a speech to Federal Parliament, Peter Slipper declared, "I believe that this action by Archbishop Aspinall seriously brings into doubt his moral fitness to be the Anglican Archbishop of Brisbane."

=== Child sexual abuse ===
In 2009, the diocese refused to revoke an age limit for child sex abuse claims, retaining the requirement that victims must sue the church before they were 21 years of age. A victim said it showed the church was protecting its money rather than its flock. Another victim stated that "[We] sue the diocese because of the overwhelming evidence that the diocese knew about the abuse and knew about the offenders yet did nothing to stop the abuse nor prevent further abuse."

In 2015, a child abuse survivor who was threatening to sue the diocese, alleged to the Guardian newspaper that Archbishop Aspinall told him that litigation against the church would be sinful. Aspinall again denied the claims.

In 2017, the diocese failed to meet two deadlines to pay another victim the compensation they were due.

At the Royal Commission into Institutional Responses to Child Sexual Abuse in March 2017 it was reported that the Diocese of Brisbane was subject to more complaints than any other Anglican diocese.

In February 2018, a group of former students of the Anglican Church Grammar School called for an independent board to govern the school, saying that they no longer wanted the diocese to control church schools "amid concern about the handling of child sexual abuse cases and its dated school governance practices".

=== Ecumenism ===
The diocese has a strong ecumenical relationship with the Roman Catholic Archdiocese of Brisbane.

The Anglican, Roman Catholic and Uniting churches perform some collaborative ministry and the Lutheran Church of Australia has been in discussions with them. However, the diocese only recognises church denominations with an episcopal form of government. In 2002, Aspinall suggested that the Uniting Church in Australia adopt such a form of governance.

== Demography ==
According to a synod paper, between 2011 and 2016, the number of parishioners in the diocese declined by 7%.

== See also ==
- Anglicare
