= Edward Tufnell (bishop) =

Bishop of Brisbane; British Anglican colonial bishop

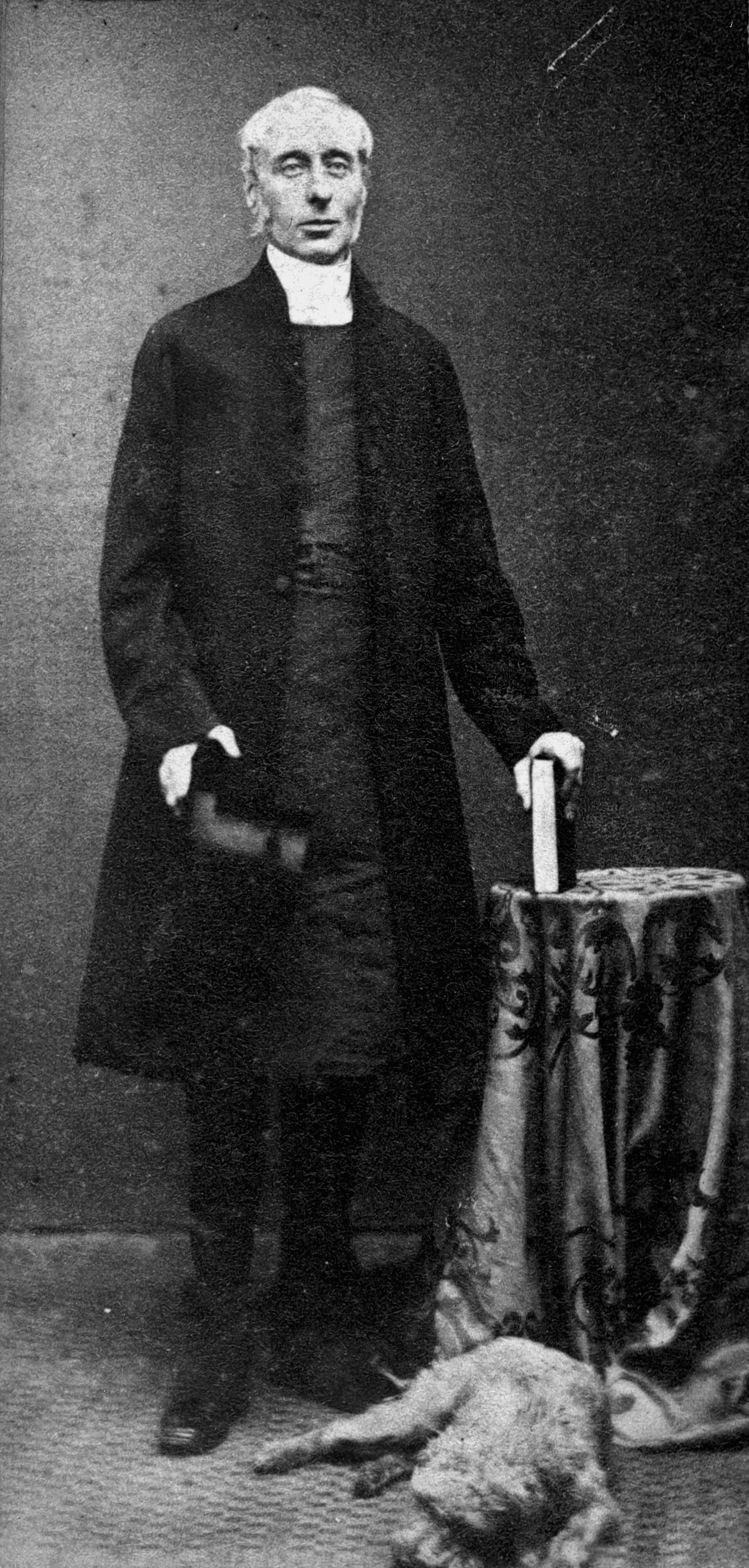
Edward Wyndham Tufnell, the first Anglican Bishop of Brisbane, 1860

Edward Wyndham Tufnell (3 October 1814 – 3 December 1896) was an Anglican priest. He was the first Anglican Bishop of Brisbane in Queensland, Australia.

== Early life ==
Tufnell was born on 3 October 1814 in Bath, Somerset and educated at Eton and Wadham College, Oxford. He was the son of a banker, John Charles Tufnell, and Uliana Ivanova Margaret Fowell, who had a total of eighteen children.

== Ecclesiastical career ==
Ordained a priest in 1839, his first posts were curacies at Broadwindsor and Broad Hinton. After this he held incumbencies at Beechingstoke and Marlborough.

He served as Anglican Bishop of Brisbane from 1859 to 1874.

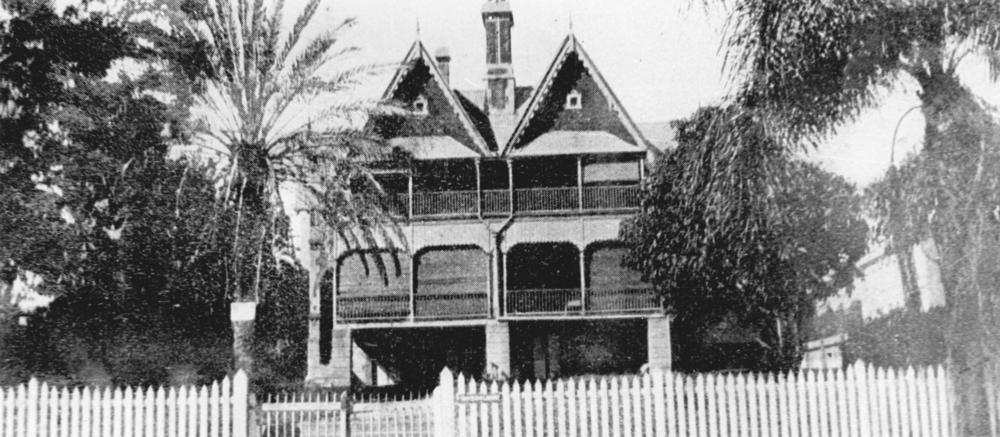
Front view of Riversleigh, North Quay, Brisbane, c. 1931

While in Brisbane in 1863, Edward Tufnell commissioned architect Benjamin Backhouse to build the house Riversleigh on North Quay as an investment.

Tufnell returned to England in 1874. In 1882 he became the vicar of Felpham near Bognor Regis and in 1888 he paid for the school to move to a new site in Felpham Way. The school is still named after him, but moved again in 1957. The rector's vestry at St Mary's Church was erected in 1899 as a memorial to him.

== Marriage and family ==
Tufnell married his cousin, Laura Tufnell, who was the daughter of John Jolliffe Tufnell of Langleys, Great Waltham, Essex. They had two children: Arthur Wyndam Tufnell, who was murdered in India while travelling on a train to Simla; and Ida Mary Uliana Mary Tufnell, who married Henry Arthur Wansbrough, a priest. Ida was the grandmother of the Benedictine monk and scholar, Dom Henry Wansbrough. Laura Tufnell was the sister of Maria Tufnell, who married Edward Strutt, founder of Strutt & Parker estate agents. Maria was lady-in-waiting to Queen Charlotte. Tufnell died on 3 December 1896.

Anglican Communion titles
New diocese	Bishop of Brisbane; 1859–1874	Succeeded by Matthew Hale
