= William Cowie (bishop) =

New Zealand bishop

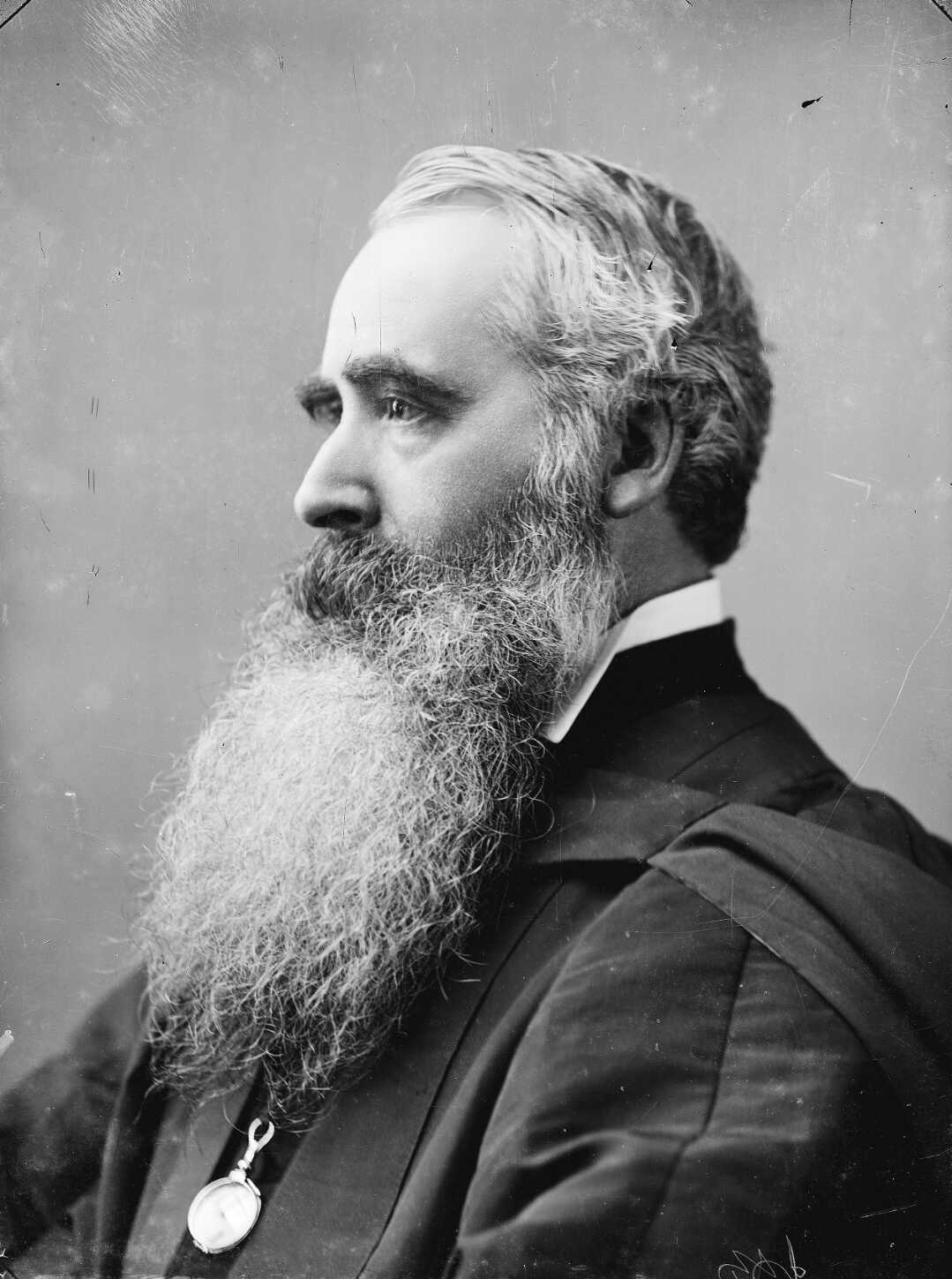
- Bishop Cowie between 1890 and 1902
- Born: 8 January 1831; London
- Died: 26 June 1902 (aged 71); Wellington, New Zealand
- Education: Trinity Hall, Cambridge
- Occupation: Bishop

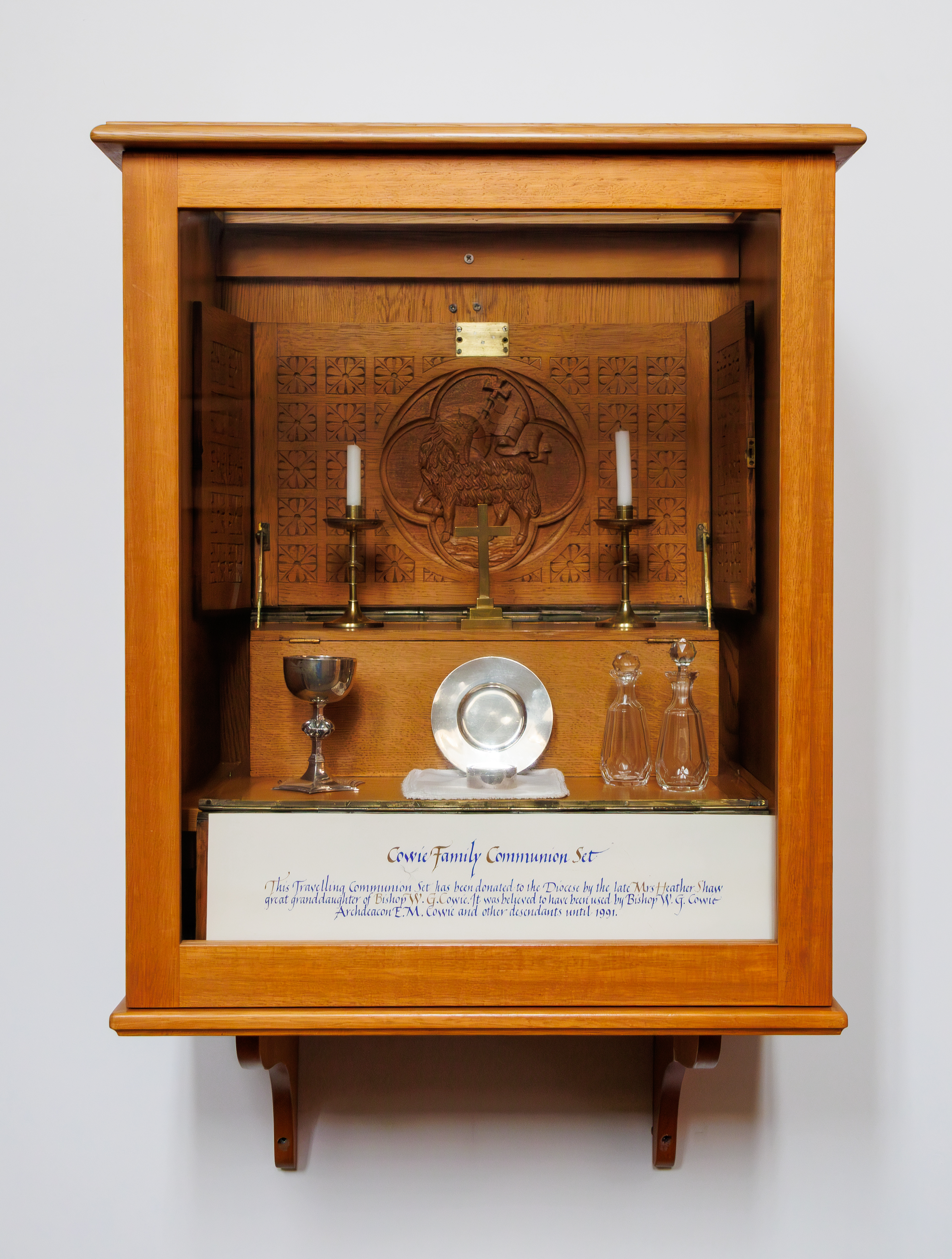
A travelling communion set used by Bishop Cowie and his descendants. Holy Trinity Cathedral, Auckland.

William Garden Cowie (8 January 1831 – 26 June 1902) was bishop of the Anglican Diocese of Auckland, New Zealand, from 1870 to 1902. Although he succeeded George Selwyn in having jurisdiction in this portion of New Zealand, he was the first bishop to be known specifically as Bishop of Auckland. His wife Eliza Jane Cowie (1835-1902) was a distinguished religious worker in her own right, and Bishop Cowie's journals refer frequently to her work with him.

== Early life and career ==
Cowie was born in London, to Alexander Cowie and his wife Elizabeth Garden, daughter of Alexander Garden. His father was from Auchterless, Aberdeenshire, in which county he grew up. Educated at Eton College and Trinity Hall, Cambridge, where he received his BA in 1855 and MA in 1865.

He was admitted deacon in 1854 by the Bishop of Ely, and licensed to the curacy of St Clement's, Cambridge. Ordained priest in 1855, also by the Bishop of Ely, he accepted the curacy of Moulton, Suffolk. Two years later, in 1857, he was appointed chaplain to the Forces in India, and served with Sir Colin Campbell's army at the capture of Lucknow in 1858, for which he received the Indian Mutiny Medal and clasp. In the following years, he was present at the battles of Allygunge, Rooyah, and Bareilly, and served in the Afghan campaign of 1863. Later that year he was chaplain to the camp of the Viceroy of India and in 1864 served as resident and examining chaplain to Bishop Cotton, Metropolitan of India. After a spell as chaplain at Kashmir in 1865, he returned home to an appointment as rector of Stafford in 1867.

== Bishop of Auckland ==
Cowie was nominated Bishop of Auckland in 1869, and took up the position the following year, serving as such for more than 30 years. He was an important influence on the expansion and development of the Anglican Church in Aotearoa, New Zealand and Polynesia during the long period of his episcopate, and was also closely involved with the ordination of indigenous Melanesian clergy. Cowie attended the Lambeth Conference in 1888 and 1897. He was elected Primate of the Anglican Church of New Zealand in 1895. In June 1902 it was announced that he would resign as bishop and primate, due to ill-health, but he died before stepping down the following week, on 21 June 1902 in Parnell, Auckland, and was buried at St Stephen's Cemetery.

He was a visitor and governor of St John's College, Auckland, and was appointed a Fellow of the University of New Zealand in 1880. During his visit to the United Kingdom in 1897, he received the degree Doctor of Divinity honoris causa from the University of Oxford.

Cowie was the author of two articles:

- Notes on Some of the Temples of Kashmir, in Journal of the Asiatic Society of Bengal, Volum XXXV, Issue II, 1867
- Notes - a visit to Norfolk Island (1872)

== Family ==
In 1869, he married Eliza Jane Webber, daughter of Dr. William Webber of Moulton, Suffolk, and granddaughter of Sir Thomas Preston, Bart., of Beeston Hill, Norfolk. She died on 18 August 1902.

== Notes ==
Religious titles
| Preceded by George Selwyn | Bishop of Auckland; 1869–1903 | Succeeded by Moore Neligan |
