= Jeremy Greaves =

Australian bishop

The Most Reverend Jeremy Greaves
- Archbishop of Brisbane
- Church: Anglican Church of Australia
- Diocese: Brisbane
- Installed: 16 December 2023
- Other post: Metropolitan of Queensland (ex officio)
- Previous posts: Assistant Bishop for the Northern Region, Diocese of Brisbane (2017–2023); Dean of Darwin (2007–2013)

Orders
- Ordination: 1997 (as deacon); 1998 (as priest)
- Consecration: 24 February 2017 by Phillip Aspinall

Personal details
- Denomination: Anglican
- Spouse: Josie
- Children: 3

Jeremy Greaves is an Australian bishop in the Anglican Church of Australia. He was an assistant bishop of Brisbane (Northern Region) from 2017 until 16 December 2023 when he was installed as Archbishop of Brisbane, succeeding Phillip Aspinall.

== Early life and ordained ministry ==
Greaves comes from a family of clergymen. One of his great-grandfathers, Arthur Nutter Thomas, was Bishop of Adelaide from 1906 to 1940, and one of his grandfathers, Walter Baddeley, was Bishop of Melanesia, based in the Solomon Islands, during World War II.

Greaves was born in the UK and came to Australia with his parents as a two year old. He grew up in a family that attended an Anglican church in Adelaide, but he left the church in his teens, considering he "was bored and unsure that [he] believed much beyond the idea that [he] was loved and loveable". He later returned to the church, knowing he would feel welcomed again.

Greaves was ordained deacon in 1997 and priest in 1998. Following his ordination he served in a number of roles including in Ceduna in South Australia and Katherine in the Northern Territory, as Dean of Christ Church Cathedral, Darwin from 2007 to 2013, and immediately prior to his appointment as Bishop for the Northern Region in the Diocese of Brisbane, as rector of St Mark's Anglican Church in Buderim and Archdeacon of the Sunshine Coast.

== Episcopal ministry ==
In November 2016, Greaves was appointed as Bishop for the Northern Region in the Diocese of Brisbane and was consecrated as bishop and installed in this ministry on 24 February 2017.

On 1 September 2023, Greaves was elected as the tenth Archbishop of Brisbane and was installed in the position on 16 December 2023. On his appointment, Greaves said that he was looking forward to serving with the diocesan community as it discerned where the Spirit was leading it, and advocating in important justice spaces.

== Views ==
Greaves has described himself as a "progressive" Christian who "live[s] on the edge of the church". In 2010, he told ABC Radio National that he would be "happy to abandon" the Apostles' Creed. In 2013, while a priest, Greaves expressed that Christians were ready to embrace same-sex marriage, and found it curious he could bless pets but not same-sex couples.

== Personal life ==
Greaves is married to Josie and has three children.
