= Province of Queensland =

Ecclesiastical province of the Anglican Church of Australia

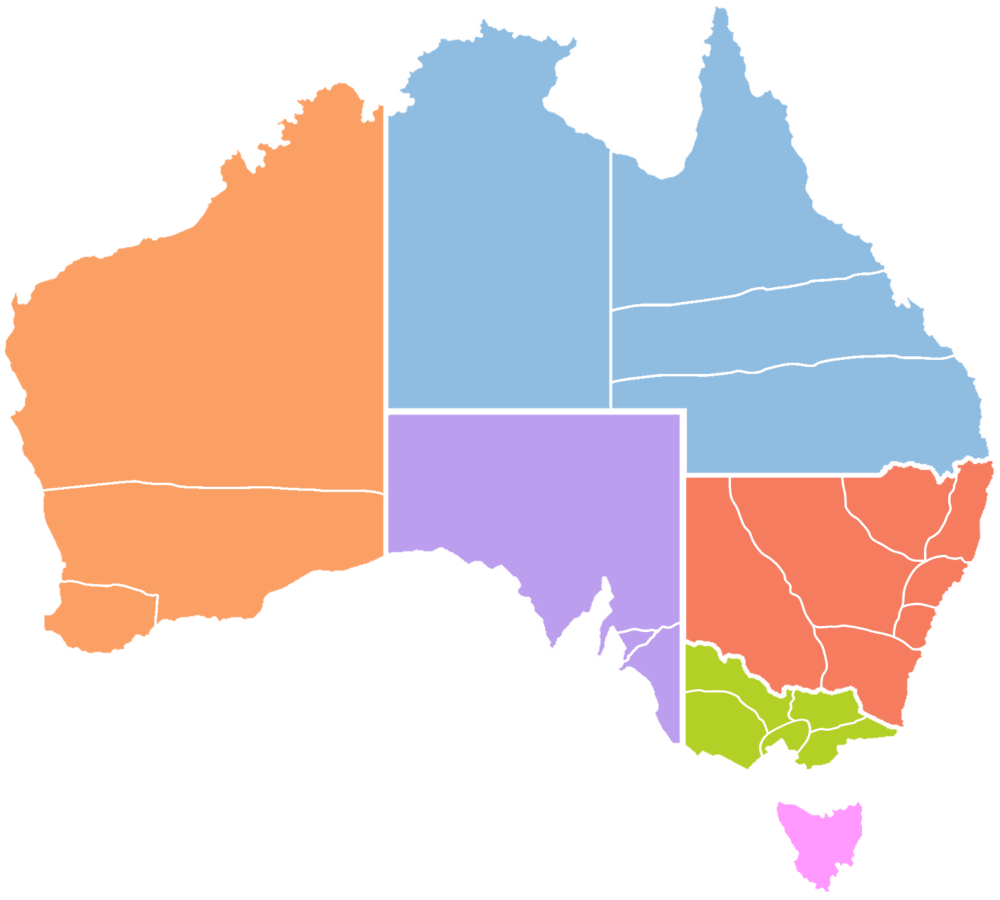
- Location of the Province (depicted in blue) in Australia
- Church: Anglican Church of Australia
- Metropolitan bishop: Archbishop of Brisbane
- Cathedral: St John's Cathedral, Brisbane
- Dioceses: Four

The Province of Queensland is an ecclesiastical province of the Anglican Church of Australia; its territorial remit includes the Northern Territory and the state of Queensland. The province consists of four dioceses: Brisbane, North Queensland, The Northern Territory and Rockhampton.

The province was erected in 1905 with the Diocese of Brisbane as its metropolitan see. The incumbent (2023) Metropolitan is Jeremy Greaves, Archbishop of Brisbane.

Prior to Papua New Guinea's independence in 1975 the province also included the Diocese of New Guinea.
