= St Clair Donaldson =

English Anglican bishop (1863–1935)

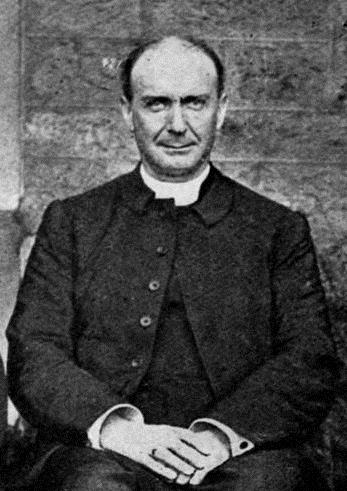
Donaldson in 1909

St Clair George Alfred Donaldson (11 February 1863 – 7 December 1935) was an English Anglican bishop. He was the first Anglican Archbishop of Brisbane, Australia, and later Bishop of Salisbury.

== Early life ==
At Eton, he was co-editor, with M. R. James of the Chronicle, for which they were paid fifteen shillings every two weeks. Their tutor H. E. Luxmoore took them to Florence during the spring holidays of 1882. His younger brother, Seton, died in a boating accident that same year. After graduating from Eton, he, his brother Stuart, M. R. James and Sydney James travelled to Switzerland. In the spring of 1883, he travelled to Greece with M. R. James, Sydney James, Walter Durnford, and Cecil Baring, 3rd Baron Revelstoke.

Anglican Communion titles
| Preceded by William Webber | Bishop of Brisbane; 1904–1905 | Succeeded by Himself as Archbishop of Brisbane |
| Preceded by Himself as Bishop of Brisbane | Archbishop of Brisbane; 1905–1921 | Succeeded by Gerald Sharp |
| Preceded by Frederick Ridgeway | Bishop of Salisbury; 1921–1935 | Succeeded by Neville Lovett |
