= Gerald Sharp =

English clergyman (1865–1933)

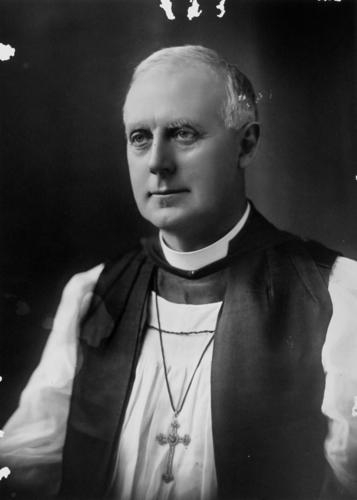
Gerald Sharp

Gerald Sharp (27 October 1865 – 30 August 1933) was an English-born Anglican clergyman, who served as Archbishop of Brisbane from 1921 until his death in 1933. Sharp never married. He died of renal failure while still in office on 30 August 1933 and was buried in Toowong Cemetery. Sharp's Roman Catholic counterpart, the long-serving archbishop James Duhig, considered Sharp "the most lovable man I knew".

Church of England titles
Preceded by St Clair Donaldson	Archbishop of Brisbane; 1921–1933	Succeeded by William Wand
