= William Webber (bishop) =

Anglican bishop of Brisbane (1837–1903)

William Thomas Thornhill Webber (30 January 1837 – 3 August 1903) was the third Anglican Bishop of Brisbane in Queensland, Australia.

== Early life ==
Webber was born in London, the son of a surgeon, William Webber and his wife Eliza (née Preston). He was educated at Tonbridge School, Kent, at Norwich School under John Woolley and Pembroke College, Oxford where he obtained B.A. in 1859 and M.A. in 1862.

== Religious life ==
Webber was ordained a deacon in 1860 and a priest in 1861.

Webber spent four years as curate of Chiswick (1860–64). He was then Vicar of St John the Evangelist, Holborn, (1864–85) and was a member of the London School Board (1882–85). He was consecrated bishop of Brisbane on 11 June 1885 by Edward White Benson, Archbishop of Canterbury, at St Paul's Cathedral, London and enthroned on 17 November 1885 in St John's Cathedral, Brisbane. He brought clergymen over from Oxford and Cambridge Universities for work in Queensland on five-year tours of duty.

Webber visited England in 1888 to attend the Pan-Anglican synod at Lambeth. He spent a lot of his time in raising funds, including money for a cathedral in Brisbane but died before work commenced.

== Later life ==
On 3 August 1903, Webber died in Brisbane at his residence Bishopsbourne. He was buried on Tuesday 4 August 1903 in Toowong Cemetery.

Anglican Communion titles
| Preceded by Matthew Hale | Bishop of Brisbane; 1885–1903 | Succeeded by St Clair Donaldson |
