= Phillip Aspinall =

Australian Anglican bishop

The Most Reverend Phillip Aspinall AC
- Primate of Australia (2005–2014); Archbishop of Brisbane (2002–2022)
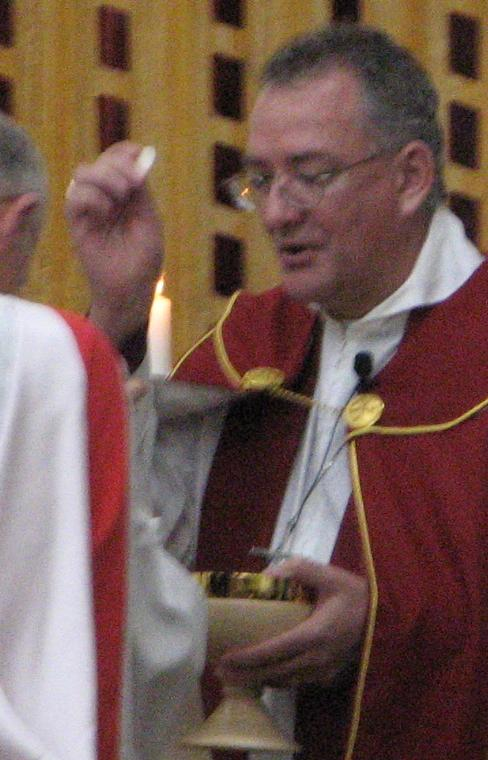
- Aspinall administering Holy Communion
- Church: Anglican Church of Australia
- Province: Queensland
- Diocese: Brisbane
- In office: 2005–2014 (as primate); 2002–2022 (as archbishop)
- Predecessor: Peter Carnley; (as primate); Peter Hollingworth; (as archbishop)
- Successor: Jeremy Greaves (archbishop-elect)
- Previous posts: Assistant Bishop, Adelaide (1999–2001)

Orders
- Ordination: 25 July 1987 (as deacon); 1989 (as priest)
- Consecration: 29 June 1999

Personal details
- Born: Phillip John Aspinall; 17 December 1959 (age 66) Hobart, Tasmania, Australia
- Denomination: Anglicanism
- Residence: Bishopsbourne, Ascot
- Spouse: Christa Aspinall
- Education: University of Tasmania; Melbourne College of Divinity; Trinity College, University of Melbourne; Deakin University; Monash University

Phillip John Aspinall AC (born 17 December 1959) is an Australian Anglican bishop who served as Anglican Archbishop of Brisbane from February 2002 until December 2022, and was also the Primate of the Anglican Church of Australia from July 2005 until he stood down on 4 July 2014.

== Early life and education ==
Aspinall was born in Hobart Tasmania, Australia, on 17 December 1959.

He obtained a BSc degree from the University of Tasmania in 1980, a Graduate Diploma in Religious Education (GradDipRE) from Brisbane College of Advanced Education, a BD degree with Honours from Melbourne College of Divinity in 1988 (through Trinity College (University of Melbourne) and the United Faculty of Theology), an MBA from Deakin University and a PhD degree in education from Monash University.

Aspinall worked as a computer programmer for the Tasmanian Education Department. He has worked in a number of roles in the Anglican Church in Tasmania and Victoria: with the Diocese of Tasmania as diocesan field officer for the Anglican Boys’ Society, the diocesan youth and education officer; deputy warden at Christ College in the University of Tasmania (1980 to 1984); director of parish education at St Stephen's Church, Mount Waverley, in the Diocese of Melbourne (1985).

== Ordained ministry ==
Aspinall was ordained a deacon in Tasmania on 25 July 1987 and a priest two years later. He served as assistant curate, assistant priest and parish priest in various locations in Tasmania including Claremont. He was director of Anglicare Tasmania (1994–1999) was Archdeacon for Church and Society for two years.

Aspinall was consecrated as a bishop on 29 June 1999 in Adelaide where he served as an assistant bishop until December 2001.

In 2003, a widely reported allegation of child sexual abuse by another priest, Louis Daniels, in Tasmania implicated Aspinall as being associated with the circumstances leading to the alleged abuse. Aspinall denied that he was in any way involved with the circumstances of the alleged abuse. The archbishop conceded he had written a reference for Daniels when he was sentenced in 1999. Aspinall was mentioned in the royal commission investigating sexual abuse in organisations.

By his admission, Aspinall was surprised by a "no religion" campaign which was launched by an atheist lobby group in the lead-up to the 2011 Census.

In terms of social justice issues, Aspinall has spoken out against the ill-treatment of asylum seekers.

Aspinall has encouraged new money-making ventures for the diocese. During the cathedral's completion several fundraising efforts were made. He has also initiated ventures to allow parishioners to tithe via direct debit and leave their estates to the diocese by distributing information about creating wills that favour the diocese.

Between the retirement of Philip Freier on 31 March 2020 and the election of Geoffrey Smith on 7 April 2020, Aspinall served as interim primate. On August 29, 2022, Aspinall announced his resignation as Archbishop of Brisbane to take effect from 5PM February 2, 2023.

Aspinall retired as archbishop in December 2022.

== Personal life ==
Aspinall is married to Christa Aspinall with whom he has two children.

In the 2021 Queen's Birthday Honours, Aspinall was appointed a Companion of the Order of Australia (AC).

Anglican Communion titles
Preceded by Peter Carnley	Primate of Australia; 2005–2014	Succeeded by Philip Freier
Preceded by Peter Hollingworth	Archbishop of Brisbane; 2002–2022	Succeeded by Jeremy Greaves (Archbishop-elect)
