= Anglican Archbishop of Brisbane =

Australian member of the clergy

Archbishop of Brisbane
- Archbishopric

anglican
- Coat of arms of the Diocese
- Incumbent: Jeremy Greaves since 16 December 2023
- Style: The Most Reverend

Location
- Country: Australia
- Ecclesiastical province: Queensland
- Residence: Bishopsbourne, Ascot

Information
- First holder: Edward Tufnell
- Denomination: Anglican
- Established: Bishopric in 1858; Archbishopric in 1905
- Diocese: Brisbane
- Cathedral: St John's Cathedral, Brisbane

Website
- Anglican Church Southern Queensland

The Archbishop of Brisbane is the diocesan bishop of the Anglican Diocese of Brisbane, Australia, and ex officio metropolitan bishop of the ecclesiastical Province of Queensland.

== List of bishops and archbishops of Brisbane ==
Bishops of Brisbane
From	Until	Incumbent	Notes
1859	1874	Edward Tufnell	
1875	1885	Matthew Hale	Translated from Perth.
1885	1903	William Webber	Died in office.
1904	1905	St Clair Donaldson	Became Archbishop of Brisbane
Archbishops of Brisbane
From	Until	Incumbent	Notes
1905	1921	St Clair Donaldson	Translated to Salisbury.
1921	1933	Gerald Sharp	Died in office.
1934	1943	William Wand	Translated to Bath and Wells and later to London.
1943	1962	Reginald Halse	Translated from Riverina; knighted in 1962; died in office.
1963	1970	Philip Strong	Translated from New Guinea; Primate of Australia, 1966–1970.
(1970)	(1970)		Frank Coaldrake, Chairman of the Australian Board of Missions was elected Archbishop in 1970, but died before being consecrated and taking office.
1970	1980	Felix Arnott	Previously coadjutor bishop in Melbourne.
1980	1989	John Grindrod	Previously Bishop of Riverina and then of Rockhampton; Primate of Australia, 1982–1989; knighted in 1983.
1990	2001	Peter Hollingworth	Translated from the Inner City, Melbourne; Governor-General of Australia, 2001–2003.
2002	2022	Phillip Aspinall	Previously assistant bishop in Adelaide; Primate of Australia, 2005–2014.
2023	present	Jeremy Greaves	Previously assistant bishop for the northern region in Brisbane.
