= Anglican Bishop of Grafton =

Bishop of Grafton, Anglican Diocese of Grafton, Australia

Bishop of Grafton
- Bishopric

anglican
- Coat of arms of the Diocese
- Incumbent: Murray Harvey since 12 September 2018
- Style: The Right Reverend

Location
- Country: Australia
- Ecclesiastical province: New South Wales

Information
- First holder: Cecil Druitt
- Denomination: Anglicanism
- Established: 1914
- Diocese: Grafton
- Cathedral: Christ Church Cathedral, Grafton

Website
- Diocese of Grafton

The Bishop of Grafton is the diocesan bishop of the Anglican Diocese of Grafton, Australia.

== List of Bishops of Grafton ==
Bishops of Grafton
No	From	Until	Incumbent	Notes
1	1914	1921	Cecil Druitt	Previously Coadjutor Bishop of Grafton and Armidale; died in office.
2	1921	1938	John Ashton	
3	1938	1945	William Stevenson	Previously Archdeacon of Brisbane; died in office.
4	1946	1955	Christopher Storrs	Previously Archdeacon of Northam.
5	1956	1961	Kenneth Clements	Previously bishop coadjutor in the Diocese of Goulburn; translated to Canberra and Goulburn.
6	1961	1973	Gordon Arthur	Previously an assistant bishop in the Diocese of Canberra and Goulburn.
7	1973	1985	Donald Shearman	Previously Bishop of Rockhampton; later resigned his holy orders and was defrocked.
8	1985	1998	Bruce Schultz	Previously Dean of Grafton.
9	1998	2003	Philip Huggins	Previously an Assistant Bishop of Perth; later an Assistant Bishop of Melbourne.
10	2003	2013	Keith Slater	Deposed from Holy Orders in 2025.
11	2014	2018	Sarah Macneil	Previously an archdeacon in the Diocese of Canberra and Goulburn and Dean of Adelaide.
12	2018	present	Murray Harvey	Consecrated and installed 29 September 2018.

== Assistant bishops of Grafton ==
Assistant Bishops of Grafton
From	Until	Incumbent	Notes
2026	present	Tiffany Sparks	Previously Diocesan Archdeacon and Ministry Development Officer of Grafton; consecrated 12 March 2026.
