= Anglican Bishop of Canberra and Goulburn =

Bishop of Canberra and Goulburn
- Bishopric

anglican
- Coat of arms of the Diocese
- Incumbent: Mark Short since 6 April 2019
- Style: The Right Reverend

Location
- Country: Australia
- Ecclesiastical province: New South Wales

Information
- First holder: Mesac Thomas
- Denomination: Anglicanism
- Established: 1863
- Diocese: Canberra and Goulburn
- Cathedral: St Saviour's Cathedral, Goulburn

Website
- Diocese of Canberra and Goulburn

The Bishop of Canberra and Goulburn is the diocesan bishop of the Anglican Diocese of Canberra and Goulburn, Australia. The office was established in 1863 as the Bishop of Goulburn, and its name was changed to its present name in 1950.

== List of Bishops of Canberra and Goulburn ==
Bishops of Goulburn
No	From	Until	Incumbent	Notes
1	1863	1892	Mesac Thomas	Died in office.
2	1892	1901	William Chalmers	Previously a Canon of Melbourne Cathedral; died in office.
3	1902	1915	Christopher Barlow	Translated from North Queensland; retired.
4	1915	1933	Lewis Radford	Retired.
5	1934	1950	Ernest Burgmann	Became Bishop of Canberra and Goulburn.
Bishops of Canberra and Goulburn
5	1950	1960	Ernest Burgmann	Previously Bishop of Goulburn; retired.
6	1961	1971	Kenneth Clements	Previously coadjutor bishop in the diocese; Translated from Grafton; retired.
7	1972	1983	Cecil Warren	Previously assistant bishop in the diocese; retired.
8	1983	1993	Owen Dowling	Previously assistant bishop in the diocese; retired.
9	1993	2008	George Browning	Previously assistant bishop for coastal Brisbane; retired.
10	2009	2018	Stuart Robinson	Elected 1 November 2008; consecrated and enthroned 31 January 2009. Resigned 31 March 2018.
11	2019	present	Mark Short	Elected November 2018. Consecrated and installed on 6 April 2019.
