= St John's College, Morpeth =

Coordinates: 32°43′34″S 151°37′54″E

St John's College, Morpeth, known colloquially as the "Poor Man's College, Armidale", was opened in Armidale in 1898 as a theological college to train clergy to serve in the Church of England in Australia. It moved to Morpeth in 1926 and closed in 2006.

== Armidale ==
St John's College was founded in 1898 by the then Bishop of Grafton and Armidale, Arthur Green. It was part-funded by the Society for the Propagation of the Gospel. At the time the college was established, the only other theological colleges were Moore College in Sydney, which was evangelical, and Trinity College, Melbourne, which only admitted university graduates. Green deliberately intended it to be a 'poor man's college'.

The college building was designed by the Australian ecclesiastical architect John Horbury Hunt. (Hunt had designed the cathedrals in Grafton, Newcastle and Armidale.) The bishop was the first warden and did all the lecturing; there were just five students. The college was dedicated in 1899 by Saumarez Smith, Archbishop of Sydney. Three further wardens followed in short succession, adding new buildings. The visionary churchman Ernest Burgmann was appointed Warden in 1918, which was to be transformative for the college. On the invitation of Reginald Stephen, Bishop of Newcastle, in 1925 Burgmann moved the college to Morpeth. The Armidale college buildings now form part of the New England Girls' School. A stained glass window that had gone with the college to Morpeth was returned to NEGS in 2012.

== Morpeth ==
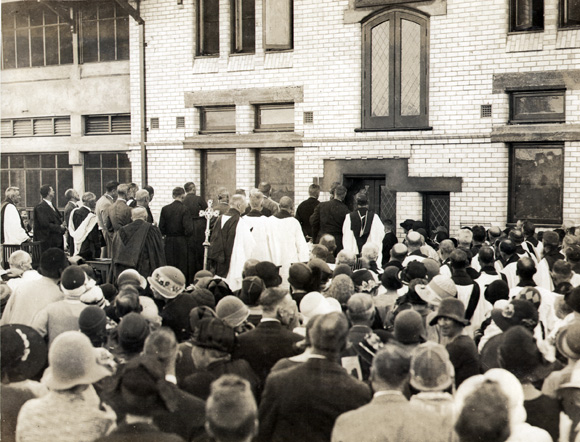
Official opening of St John's College, Morpeth, on 6 May 1926

In 1821, Lt Edward Close was granted 2,600 acres of land at Morpeth by Governor Lachlan Macquarie. Close built a house, Closebourne House. In 1849 he sold Closebourne House to the Bishop of Newcastle, who renamed it Bishopscourt and built a replacement house next to it which he called Morpeth House. After 1869, Morpeth House went through various occupations and ownerships, before being acquired in 1925 as the site for the relocated college. Additional buildings were designed by the ecclesiastical architect Louis Williams.

The college bell came from Raymond Terrace, and was the ship's bell on the Paddle Steamer Ceres, which had been wrecked on her maiden voyage in 1836. In 1942 and 1943 the college exchanged premises with the Newcastle Church of England Girls' Grammar School in order to put the girls beyond the possible reach of Japanese bombardment of Newcastle.

== Chapel ==
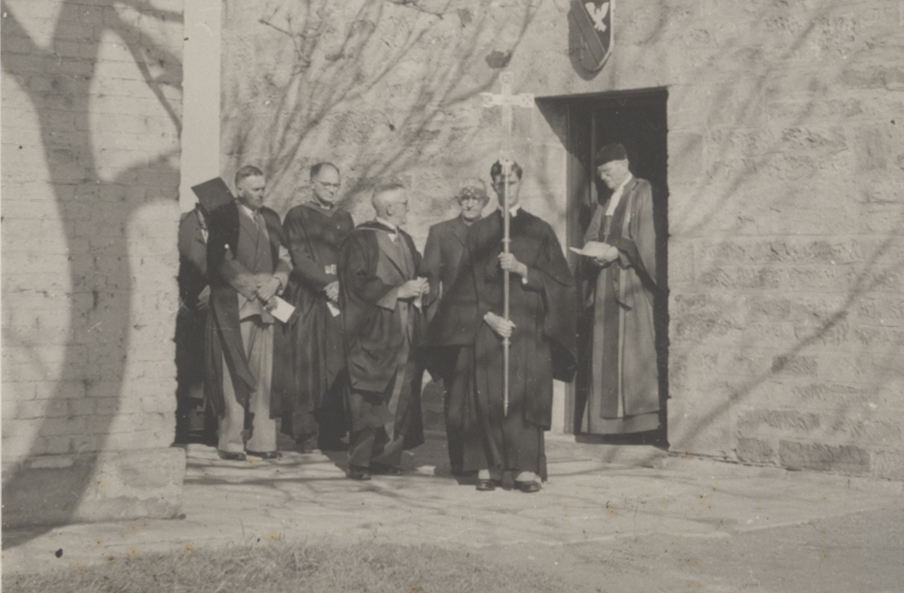
Procession leaving the chapel of St John's College, Morpeth, following its dedication in 1941

The chapel was originally within Morpeth House; in 1941 a simple chapel was built, with colonial stone from a derelict building in Morpeth.

At first, the chapel had a French harmonium. In 1965 a Norman and Beard pipe organ was installed. It was acquired from the Congregational Church in Maitland. In 1981 it was removed and in 1984 installed in a private residence in Singleton. Its replacement was a 1982 organ by Fr John Hamer-Howarth. Much of the organ is assembled from older instruments: the Open Diapason is by Palmer; the Bourdon from Croydon; the Stopped Diapason by Robson; and the Block Flute, the principal and the Fifteenth from the Methodist Chapel in Sutton-on-Soar, Northamptonshire. The main chest is from the Methodist Church in Homebush. The casework is Fr Hamer-Howarth's own work.

== Closure ==
The college closed in 2006. During the Royal Commission into Institutional Responses to Child Sexual Abuse, the college was the subject of adverse comment in respect of clerical sexual abuse.

Theological education for the Diocese of Newcastle is now provided by Trinity College, Melbourne.

The college and its grounds are now a retirement village, managed by Lendlease. The former Morpeth House is now the social centre, and the former chapel is a multi-use hall.

== College prayers ==
At the time of the college's jubilee in 1948 the collect was in the following form:

O Everlasting God, Who art ever adored by the holy angels, yet dost choose men to be the stewards of Thy mysteries: bless, we beseech Thee, the work of this College, and prosper the intentions of ARTHUR VINCENT its Founder; that they who cannot do any good without Thee, may by Thee be won to purity and love, and illuminated with a true knowledge of Thy Word and Sacraments; and so, being made able ministers of the New Testament, may advance Thy glory and the salvation of Thine elect servants; through Jesus Christ our Lord.

By the time the college closed there was a new form of collect.

Father your Son, Jesus Christ, is the one true Light that enlightens all. We pray that all places of theological learning, especially this College of St John the Evangelist, may be illuminated by your Spirit of Truth and Love.

Open the minds and hearts of all who share in the life and work of this college. May its teachers and those who direct its policy do their work with wisdom and devotion. May those who study here prepare themselves with courage and zeal for the ministry of the Gospel; and may we all be transformed and renewed into the likeness of your Son Jesus Christ who lives and reigns with you and the Holy Spirit one God forever and ever. Amen.

== Wardens and principals ==
The college was initially led by a warden; the title was changed to 'principal' in the 1980s.

=== Wardens ===
- Arthur Vincent Green, 1899-1900. Bishop of Grafton and Armidale, 1894-1900; Bishop of Ballarat, 1901-15.
- Edward Aquila Radcliff, 1901-06
- Arthur Henry Garnsey, 1907-16. Warden, St. Paul's College, Sydney, 1916-44.
- John Forster, 1916-18
- Ernest Henry Burgmann, 1918-34. Bishop of Goulburn (renamed Canberra & Goulburn in 1950), 1934-60. Founder and first Warden of St Mark's Library, Canberra (now St Mark's National Theological Centre), 1957-60.
- Thomas Marshall Robinson, 1935-54
- Henry Beauchamp St John, 1954
- Christopher Evelyn Storrs, 1955-59. Bishop of Grafton, 1946-55.
- Robert Edward Davies, 1960-63. Assistant bishop of Newcastle, 1960-63; Bishop of Tasmania, 1963-81.
- John Lovett May, 1963-74. Warden of Christ College, Hobart, 1958-63 and 1981-99.
- Lance Andrew Johnston, 1975-79

=== Principals ===
- George Christopher Garnsey, 1980-91
- Richard Tutin (acting), 1992.
- Kenneth Nash Reardon, 1993-94. Dean of Hobart, 1984-92.
- Ann Elizabeth Proctor McElligott, 1995-2002. Dean of St. Andrew's Cathedral, Honolulu, Hawaii, 2002-07.
- Don Saines (acting), 2002-04
- David Willsher and Jennifer Willsher, 2004-06

== Notable alumni ==
=== Armidale ===
- Fortescue Ash. Bishop of Rockhampton, 1928-46.
- William Ashley-Brown, Archdeacon of Bombay; Dean of Gibraltar, 1943-45.
- Wallace Conran, sub-dean (effectively dean) of Christ Church Cathedral, Grafton, 1943-47.
- Charles Hulley, Dean of Bendigo, 1952-56.
- Arnold Collingwood King. Dean of St Saviour's Cathedral, Goulburn, 1947-66.
- Henry Beauchamp St John. Warden, 1954.
- Arthur Weston, Dean of Adelaide, 1957-66

=== Morpeth ===
- David Bowden, Bishop of Bendigo, 1995-2002
- George Browning, Assistant Bishop of Brisbane, 1985-93; Bishop of Canberra and Goulburn, 1993-2008.
- Peter Carnley, Archbishop of Perth, 1981-2005 and Primate of Australia, 2000-05.
- Kenneth Clements, Archdeacon of Goulburn, 1946-56; Coadjutor Bishop of Goulburn, 1949-50; Coadjutor Bishop of Canberra and Goulburn, 1950-56; Bishop of Grafton, 1956-61; Bishop of Canberra and Goulburn, 1961-71
- Alf Clint, founder of Tranby Aboriginal College.
- John Cowland, founder of the Church Army in Australia.
- Robert Davies, warden, 1960-63; Assistant Bishop of Newcastle, 1960-63; Bishop of Tasmania, 1963-81
- Brian Farran, Dean of St Paul's Cathedral, Rockhampton, 1983; Assistant Bishop of Perth; Bishop of Newcastle, 2005-12
- Arthur Grimshaw. Dean of Brisbane, 1985-98.
- Arthur Jones. Dean of St Paul's Cathedral, Sale; Bishop of Gippsland, 1994-2001.
- Donald Kirk. Bishop of Riverina, since 2019.
- Graeme Lawrence. Dean of Christ Church Cathedral, Newcastle, 1984-2008. Deposed from holy orders for sexual misconduct, 2012.
- Ted Mosby. Assistant Bishop of the Diocese of North Queensland, 1997-2000.
- Robert Porter. Archdeacon of Ballarat, 1957-70; Bishop of The Murray, 1970-89.
- Sam Ramsden. Member of the Legislative Assembly of Queensland, 1957-71.
- Sonia Roulston. Assistant Bishop of Newcastle, since 2018.
- Bruce Schultz. Assistant Bishop of Brisbane, 1983-85; Bishop of Grafton, 1985-98.
- Donald Shearman. Bishop of Rockhampton, 1963-71; Chairman, Australian Board of Missions, 1971-73; Bishop of Grafton, 1973-85. (Deposed from holy orders for sexual misconduct, 2004.)
- Douglas Stevens. Bishop of Riverina, 2005-12.
- John Vockler (Brother John-Charles FODC). Archdeacon of the Eyre Peninsula, Vicar-General and Coadjutor Bishop of Adelaide, 1959-62; Bishop of Polynesia, 1962-68; Assistant Bishop of Chelmsford, 1972-74; Assistant Bishop of Southwark, 1974-75; Assistant Bishop of Quincy; Bishop of New Orleans (Anglican Catholic Church), 1999-2005; Archbishop of the Anglican Catholic Church, 2001-05.
- Arthur Warr, Sub-Dean of Christ Church Cathedral, Grafton, 1946-49, and Dean, 1949-65.
- Tom Wilmot. Assistant Bishop of Perth, 2004-16.
