= Tiffany Sparks =

Australian Anglican bishop

The Right Reverend Tiffany Sparks
- Assistant Bishop of Grafton
- Church: Anglican Church of Australia
- Diocese: Grafton
- In office: 2026–present
- Other posts: Diocesan Archdeacon, Grafton (2019–2026)

Orders
- Ordination: 2011 by Phillip Aspinall
- Consecration: 12 March 2026 by Peter Stuart

Personal details
- Born: 1981 (age 44–45)
- Denomination: Anglican
- Spouse: Grant
- Education: Australian Catholic University

Tiffany Sparks is an Australian Anglican bishop. She has served as assistant bishop in the Anglican Diocese of Grafton since March 2026. Before becoming a bishop, she served as diocesan archdeacon and ministry development officer of Grafton from 2019. Her views on women's ordination, same-sex marriage and church reform have been reported by ABC News, The Guardian and SBS as well as in church media.

== Early life and education ==
Sparks studied social science and theology at Australian Catholic University.

== Ministry ==
Sparks was ordained in 2011 in the Anglican Diocese of Brisbane. Her curacy included serving at St Mark's Anglican Church, The Gap. In 2012 she became priest-in-charge, and later rector, of St Paul's Anglican Church, Ithaca-Ashgrove, in Brisbane, where she served for seven years.

In June 2019, Sparks moved to the Anglican Diocese of Grafton to take up the role of diocesan archdeacon and ministry development officer. Murray Harvey, Bishop of Grafton, announced in December 2025 that Sparks would be consecrated as a bishop to serve as assistant bishop. Her consecration took place at Christ Church Cathedral, Grafton, on 12 March 2026.

== Public commentary and coverage ==
In 2014, Sparks was the subject of a feature profile, Leap of Faith, in U on Sunday, the Sunday magazine of Brisbane's Sunday Mail.

In April 2016, Sparks appeared on the ABC television panel programme Q&A in a discussion of religion and public life. ABC's report on the episode quoted her comments about women's leadership in churches, including her observation that some Anglican dioceses in Australia still did not ordain women. The Guardian also reported on the panel's discussion of marriage equality, domestic violence and Indigenous reconciliation, and separately highlighted Sparks' remarks that progressive Christians were open to discussing same-sex marriage and that LGBT Christians made significant contributions to church life.

In 2019, Sparks was one of the participants in the SBS documentary series Christians Like Us. SBS's introductory and follow-up coverage described her as a progressive Anglican priest who supported LGBTQIA rights and women in church leadership, and said she joined the series to show that Christians could not be reduced to a single set of beliefs. Reviewing the series for The Guardian, Luke Buckmaster identified Sparks as one of its housemates and described the programme as centred on disputes about the church's treatment of LGBT people, sexism and child abuse.

In October 2019, SBS's The Feed quoted Sparks, then archdeacon of Grafton, criticising Archbishop Glenn Davies' call for supporters of same-sex marriage to leave the Anglican Church. The report said she was deeply saddened by the comments, argued that the church should reform rather than exclude people, and described the dispute as a matter of integrity and communion.

Sparks has spoken about her support for gender equality in the church. In an interview after her consecration in 2026, Sparks said she hoped her new role would encourage more women to seek opportunities within ministry.

== See also ==
- List of women bishops in the Anglican Church of Australia
- Ordination of women in the Anglican Communion
- List of female Anglican bishops
