= Australian Centre for Christianity and Culture =

Church building in Australian Capital Territory, Australia

Coordinates: 35.305°S 149.138°E

The Australian Centre for Christianity and Culture is a national Christian ecumenical centre, established in 1993, in Canberra, the national capital of Australia. It encourages dialogue and cooperation among Christian churches and between Christianity and other faiths, as well as exploring issues relating to reconciliation in Australia and the interface between Christian faith and Australian culture. The Centre is a research centre within Charles Sturt University, through a formal partnership established in 1998 between the Anglican Diocese of Canberra and Goulburn.

== History of the Site ==
The land on which the Centre is located is Ngunnawal country, and the Centre acknowledges the Ngunnawal as the traditional custodians. Following European settlement, it became known as Rottenberry Hill, after George Rottenberry, an early settler.

The American architect Walter Burley Griffin’s design for the new, planned city of Canberra was accepted in 1912. Griffin’s design included sites for national cathedrals or churches for each of the main Christian denominations. The Church of England (as the Anglican Church was then called) site was Rottenberry Hill.

It was dedicated by the acting Primate, Charles Riley, the Archbishop of Perth on Sunday 8 May 1927 for use as a national cathedral: the National Library of Australia holds the Mildenhall Collection of photographs of early Canberra, including one of the dedication. The following day, the Duke of York inaugurated the new national capital. That afternoon a RAAF plane crash-landed on Rattonbury Hill, with the pilot subsequently dying of his injuries.

Section 9 of the Australian Constitution requires that all land within the Seat of Government (now the Australian Capital Territory) be held by way of a leasehold interest. The terms of the original leases in the Federal Capital Territory (as the ACT was known until 1938) required that work be commenced on building within two years. Prompted by Lewis Radford, the Bishop of Goulburn (which included the FCT), the Church’s General Synod Canberra Committee held an open competition for the design of a cathedral and associated buildings. That competition was won by Harold Crone.

Radford’s successor Ernest Burgmann, who renamed the diocese ‘Canberra and Goulburn’ in 1950, was less enthusiastic about a national cathedral. He established St Mark’s Library (now St Mark’s National Theological Centre) on the Rottenberry Hill site in 1957. By this time Burgmann’s idea for the site had developed into a collegiate church, on the model of Westminster Abbey.

Little real progress occurred, and a successor bishop, Cecil Warren sought approval from General Synod in 1981 for a national ‘Great Church’ to be completed in time for the Australian Bicentenary in 1988. This proposal was badly received, and reduced to just ‘a national project’.

The site was finally developed following a change of direction, led by the then bishop, George Browning, the Governor-General, William Deane and the Indigenous leader Lowitja O'Donoghue.

== The Vision and pillars ==
The Centre's vision is to be the interface between Christianity, Australian society, culture and indigenous peoples. Its tagline is "Wisdom for the Common Good."

The Centre operates under four pillars: - Wisdom through civil society - Peace through new religious engagements - Resilience in institutional life and ethical leadership - Creativity through the arts, sciences and culture

== The Centre ==
The Centre is located on a small knoll overlooking Lake Burley Griffin on Kings Avenue and immediately south of the Parliamentary Triangle in the heart of Canberra. The administration building George Browning House is adjacent to St Mark's National Theological Centre. Next to George Browning House is the Chambers Pavilion, which includes a meeting room.

Atop the site is a tall, stylised, steel cross, on the centreline of the major axis of the Centre's building plan. Down this axis is a ceremonial fire pit, then a grassed amphitheatre area, then the main building of the Centre's chapel. Beside the chapel is the Great Bell (John Taylor & Co, 1986).

The Pilgrim's Walk leads away from the Centre's buildings to the Pilgrim Poles, the labyrinth and the Bible Garden. The Bible Garden features plants described in the texts of the bible. It was established with a benevolent grant from The Bible Garden Trust and opened in 2008.

== Structure ==
=== Board ===
The Centre has a Board with representation of Australian Christian denominations and communities.

=== Executive Director ===
- Professor Peter Sherlock (2025 to present) (Executive Director - acting)
- Ms Meg Richens (2024-2025) (Interim Executive Director)
- Dr Jonathan Cole (2023-2024) (Interim Executive Director)
- Professor Anthony Maher (2022-2023)
- Rt Rev'd Professor Stephen Pickard (2015–2022)
- Rev Prof Dr James Haire, Professor of Theology at Charles Sturt University, immediate past President of the National Council of Churches in Australia, formerly President of the Uniting Church in Australia 2000-2003.

The first ED, from 1999, was Rev Dr David Millikan, former head of religious programming with the Australian Broadcasting Commission, founding director of the Zadok Centre, commentator and filmmaker.

=== Secretariat ===
A small secretariat operates the Centre.

== See also ==
- List of buildings and structures in the Australian Capital Territory
