= List of women bishops in the Anglican Church of Australia =

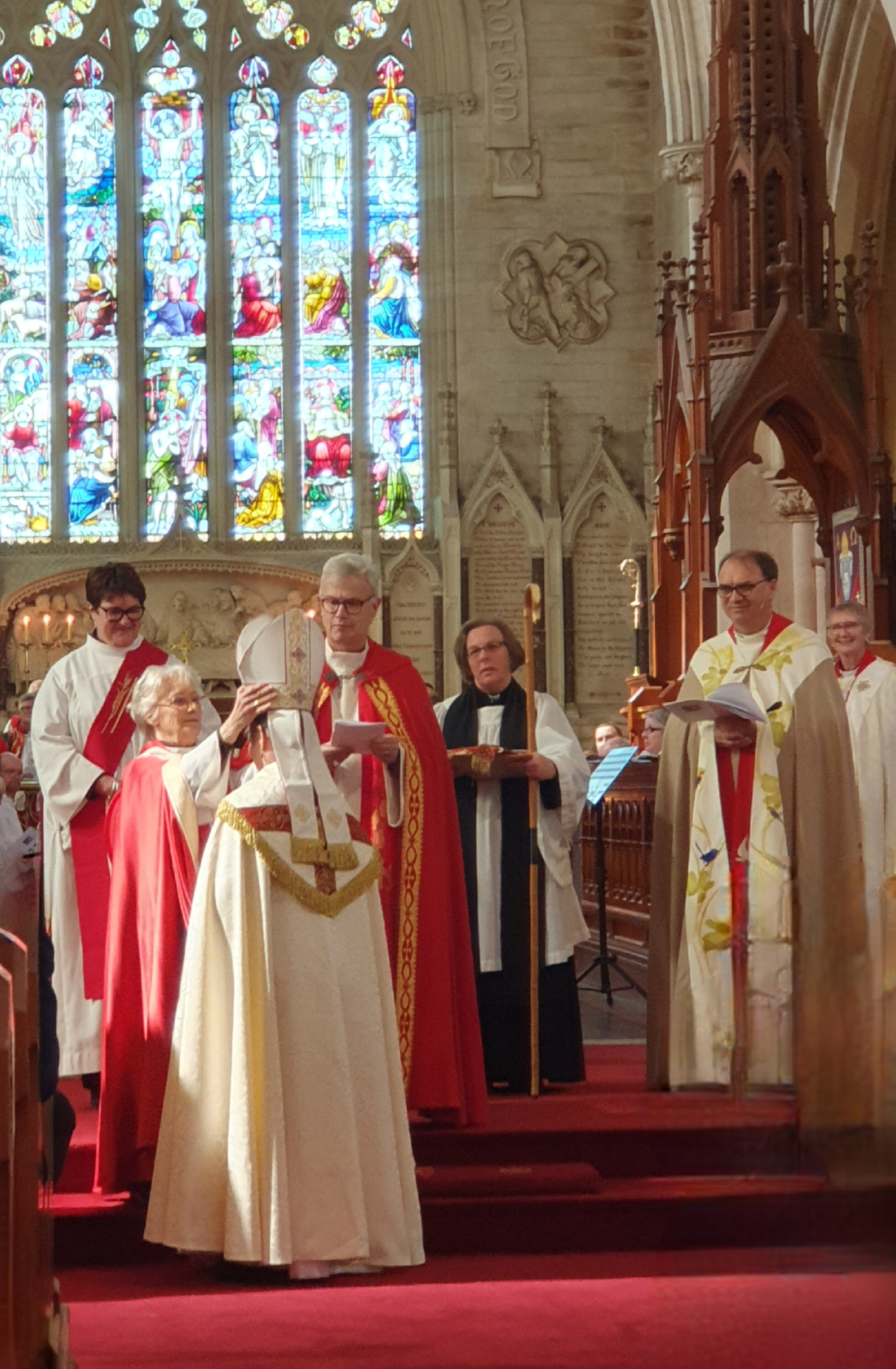
Vanessa Bennett has a mitre placed on her head as part of her consecration as Assistant Bishop of the Anglican diocese of Canberra and Goulburn.

In September 2007 a majority of the Appellate Tribunal of the Anglican Church of Australia decided nothing in the church's constitution prevented a diocese from consecrating women priests as bishops. The appointment of women as bishops is still contested in a few parts of the Anglican Church in Australia and is discussed in both the religious and mainstream press.

The Anglican Diocese of Sydney refuses to recognise women as priests or bishops and will only ordain women as deacons. Metropolitans usually consecrate bishops. The metropolitan of the province and state of New South Wales is also the Archbishop of Sydney. The Anglican diocese of Canberra and Goulburn, the Anglican diocese of Grafton and the Anglican diocese of Newcastle are located within the province of New South Wales. Three consecutive Archbishops of Sydney, who are also Metropolitans of New South Wales, formally authorised the consecration of six women bishops within those dioceses, but would not participate in the ceremonies and deputised other bishops to conduct the consecrations: the Bishop of Newcastle for three women in Canberra and Goulburn, one woman in Newcastle and one in Grafton, and the Bishop of Canberra and Goulburn for the first female Bishop of Grafton.

These women have been consecrated and installed as bishops in the Anglican Church of Australia. Each bishop's biographical article is linked from her name when one has been written.

| Name | Date first consecrated bishop | Office, Diocese, Dates |
|---|---|---|
| Kay Goldsworthy | 22 May 2008 | Assistant Bishop, Perth (2008–2015); Bishop, Gippsland (2015–2017); Archbishop, Perth (since 2018) |
| Barbara Darling | 31 May 2008 | Bishop for Diocesan Ministries, Melbourne (2008–2009); Bishop of the Eastern Region, Melbourne (2009–2014) |
| Genieve Blackwell | 31 March 2012 | Regional Assistant Bishop, Wagga Wagga, Canberra and Goulburn (2012–2015); Assistant Bishop Marmingatha Episcopate, Melbourne (since 2015) |
| Alison Taylor | 6 April 2013 | Bishop, Southern Region, Brisbane (2013–2018) |
| Sarah Macneil | 1 March 2014 | Bishop, Grafton (2014–2018) |
| Kate Wilmot | 6 August 2015 | Assistant Bishop, South Area of Episcopal Oversight, Perth (since 2015) |
| Sonia Roulston | 10 May 2018 | Assistant Bishop, Inland Episcopate, Newcastle (since 2018) |
| Kate Prowd | 6 October 2018 | Assistant Bishop, Melbourne (since 2018) |
| Denise Ferguson | 21 July 2019 | Assistant Bishop, Adelaide (2019-2024) |
| Carol Wagner | 22 February 2020 | Assistant Bishop, Canberra and Goulburn (2020–2024) |
| Sarah Plowman | 21 June 2024 | Assistant Bishop and Bishop for the Northern Region, Brisbane (since 2024) |
| Sophie Relf-Christopher | 15 August 2024 | Assistant Bishop, Adelaide (since 2024) |
| Vanessa Bennett | 24 August 2024 | Assistant Bishop, Canberra and Goulburn (since 2024) |
| Tiffany Sparks | 12 March 2026 | Assistant Bishop, Grafton (since 2026) |
| Megan Curlis-Gibson | 19 September 2026 | Bishop of Merri, Melbourne (since 2026) |

== See also ==
- List of the first women ordained as priests in the Anglican Church of Australia in 1992
- List of female Anglican bishops
- Ordination of women in the Anglican Communion
