= Christ Church, Rouse Hill =

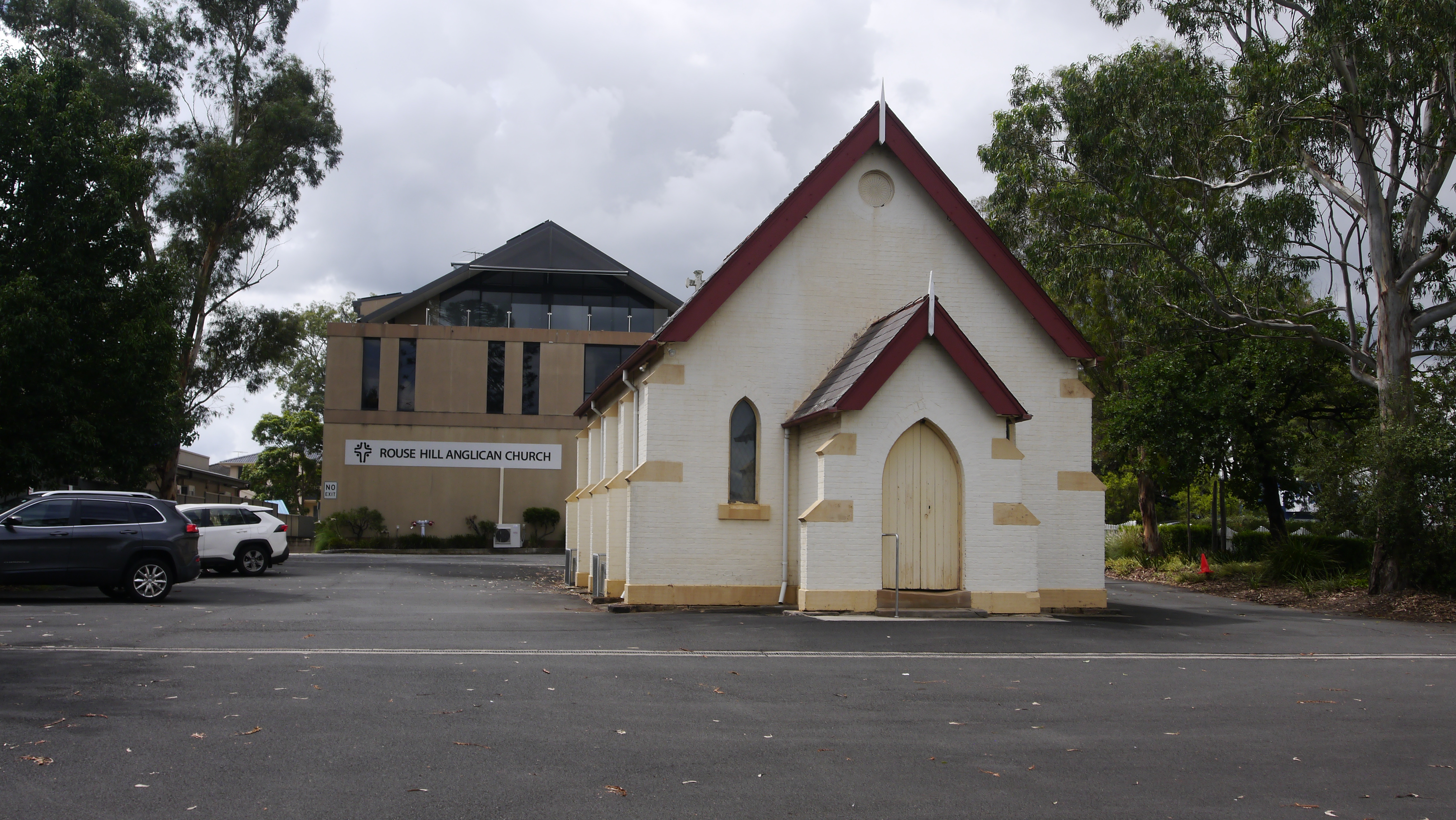
- Rouse Hill Anglican Church with historic Christ Church in the foreground and the 2008 Ministry and Education Centre in the background

- Location in New South Wales
- 33°41′01″S 150°55′02″E
- Location: Windsor Road, Rouse Hill, New South Wales
- Country: Australia
- Denomination: Anglican

History
- Consecrated: 1878

Architecture
- Architect: Edmund Blacket
- Architectural type: Gothic
- Completed: 1862
- Construction cost: £603 3s

Specifications
- Capacity: 300 (Note: The source is a historical newspaper and has some damage to the text. It may read either 300 or 360. This is the capacity of the historical Christ Church building alone. The Ministry Centre and 1908 Hall are not included.)

Administration
- Province: Province of New South Wales
- Diocese: Diocese of Sydney

Christ Church is a historic church building belonging to Rouse Hill Anglican Church of the Anglican Diocese of Sydney located on Windsor Road, Rouse Hill, in the north-west of Sydney, New South Wales, Australia.

Christ Church was built in 1862 and is one of the oldest surviving buildings in Rouse Hill.

== History ==
=== 19th century ===
On 14 December 1862, William Cowper, the Dean of Sydney, visited the site for the church in Rouse Hill and opened it for divine service with a sermon from Proverbs 14. Despite the heavy rain the service was well attended. The church had been constructed at an unspecified date before this, however, the land for the church, ¾ acre in total, was not donated by Robert Fitzgerald to the Bishop of Sydney until the next year. By May 1863, £521 21s 6½d of the £603 3s it cost to build the church had been raised, under the management of John Schofield, and on 16 July 1863, the church building was licensed to operate. The church was constructed from lime kiln brick and sandstone.

From 1863 to 1869, the Christ Church building was used as both a church and school. In 1864, the Bishop of Sydney, Frederic Barker, held the first Confirmation at the church. By 1866, a teacher's residence had been built for the school.

In 1869, a separate building was built on the site for the purpose of operating the school. In 1875, the school changed from a denominational school to a public school. On 19 November 1878, Christ Church was consecrated. That same year, a chancel and Sanctuary were added to the church building.

In 1887, Christ Church received their first curate, Copeland King, having previously been led by the rector of St Paul's Castle Hill. The next year in 1888, the school building closed and pupils transferred to new Rouse Hill Public School.

=== 20th century ===
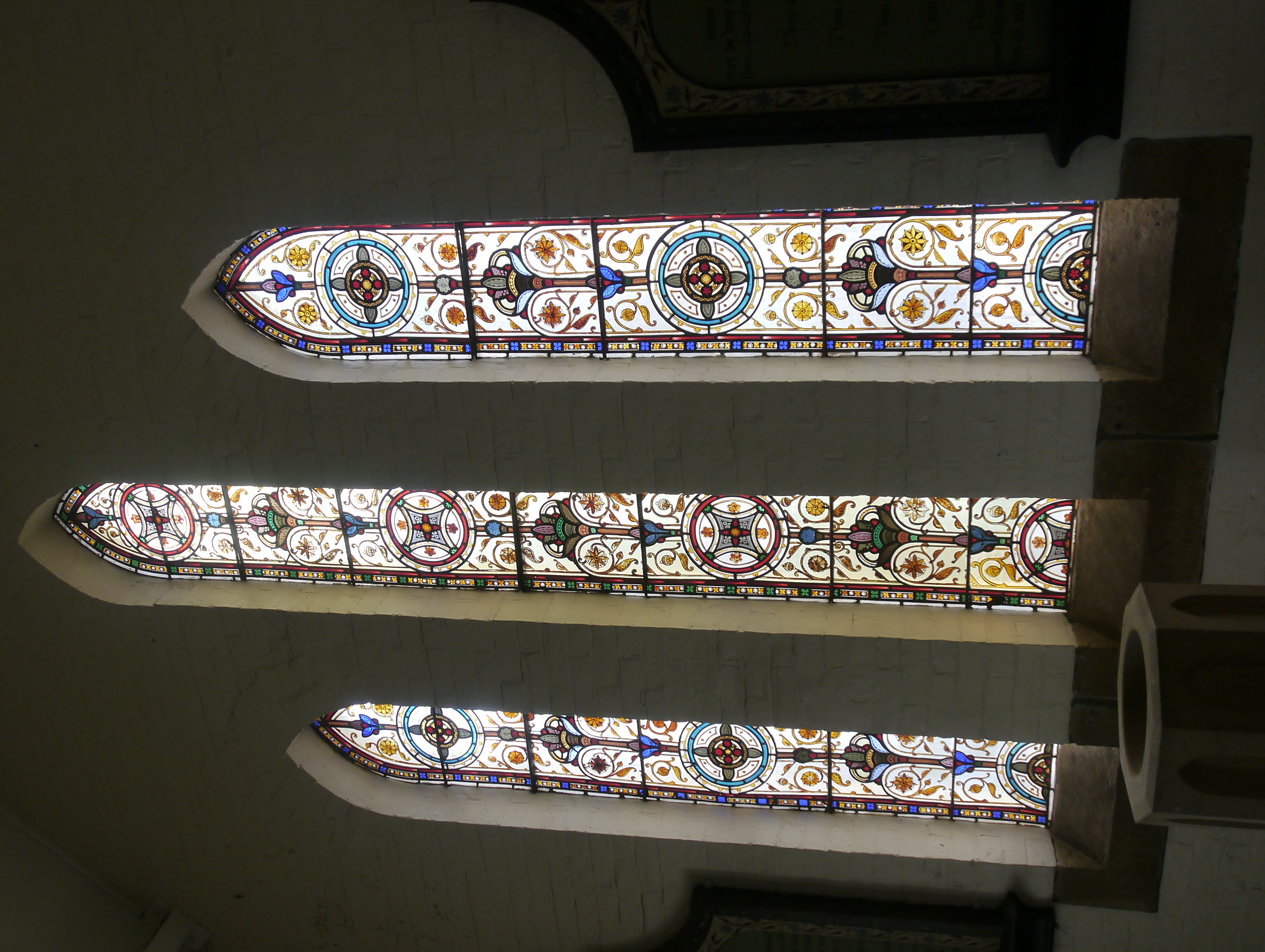
The stained glass windows behind the chancel

From 1904 to 1906, the future Bishop of Grafton, William Stevenson was the curate at Christ Church. In 1908, the school building was demolished and replaced by a hall that still stands. On 16 August 1913, the Church celebrated its jubilee. The jubilee concert raised £27 for repairing the roof on the church. R. B. Orchard was noted among the significant guests at the jubilee. In 1923, both the 1908 hall and the church building underwent renovations for a total cost of £150.

On 12 July 1963, centenary celebrations were held at Christ Church, presided by the then Archbishop, Hugh Gough. That same year, the school master's residence on the site was demolished.

In 1979, the church was transferred from the parish of Riverstone to Kellyville. Services were held monthly from that point. The 1980 Year Book of the Diocese of Sydney was the last time Christ Church is mentioned having its own congregation in the 20th century, with the church closing sometime in the 1980s. By 1997, the building was in a dilapidated state, with boarded windows and damage to the roof and gutters.

From 24 May 1998, the church buildings were used as a home for the congregation from St. Stephens, Kellyville whilst their own buildings were being constructed. Refurbishment was done to the roof, windows, woodwork, electricals, and the gutters.

=== 21st century ===
In 2004, the Christ Church buildings fell out of use when a new building for St. Stephens was completed in Kellyville. In February 2004, the Rouse Hill Provisional Anglican Parish was formed and began meeting at the nearby Rouse Hill Anglican College. In 2006, they lodged a Development Application with the Baulkham Hills Shire Council to redevelop the site. Construction commenced in 2007, and a new Ministry and Education Centre was built alongside restoration works on the two historic buildings – Christ Church and the 1908 Hall.

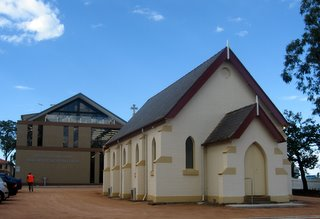
Christ Church in 2008

In March 2008, the Rouse Hill Provisional Anglican Parish moved to the site from their temporary home at Rouse Hill Anglican College and became the Rouse Hill Anglican Church. The Ministry and Education Centre was officially opened on 27 April 2008 by the then Archbishop of Sydney, Dr Peter Jensen and Rouse Hill Anglican Church's Curate – Martin Morgan. At that time, the church operated two services, one at 10am and another at 6:30pm.

== Current ministry ==
The current rector is the Rev. Graeme Howells. The church has two services each Sunday at 10am and 5pm. The church operates children's playtime programs on Thursdays, youth programs on Fridays, and English classes on Mondays and Fridays.

== See also ==
- Australian non-residential architectural styles
- List of Anglican churches in the Diocese of Sydney
