= Trevor Edwards (bishop) =

Australian Anglican bishop (born 1950)

The Right Reverend Trevor Edwards
- Assistant bishop and Vicar-General, Anglican Diocese of Canberra and Goulburn
- Church: Anglican Church of Australia
- Diocese: Canberra & Goulburn
- In office: 12 June 2004 – 11 January 2020

Orders
- Ordination: 1978 (as deacon and priest) by Marcus Loane (as deacon); Ken Short (as priest)
- Consecration: 12 June 2004 by George Browning

Personal details
- Born: 1950 (age 75–76)

Trevor William Edwards (born 1950) is a retired Australian Anglican bishop, who served as an assistant bishop in the Anglican Diocese of Canberra and Goulburn from 2004 to 2020, and as Vicar-General of the Diocese from 2009 to 2020.

Edwards was ordained in 1978. He was rector of parishes at Camden and Hurstville Grove in the Diocese of Sydney before being appointed Archdeacon of South Sydney in 1996 and Archdeacon for Ordination in the Sydney Diocese in 2000. Edwards was considered as a candidate for Bishop of South Sydney in 2000, following Peter Watson's move to become Archbishop of Melbourne, but Robert Forsyth was chosen instead. Edwards nominated as a candidate for Archbishop of Sydney in the 2001 election, describing himself as a ‘generous evangelical’ who was uncompromising in defence of the essentials of the faith, but ‘more relaxed on the edges, the things which ultimately do not matter for salvation’. Edwards was eliminated in the first round after failing to achieve a majority of votes in his favour from either clergy or laity.

In February 2003, Edwards moved to Canberra to take up a position in the Diocese of Goulburn and Canberra as Archdeacon of South Canberra and Rector of St Matthew's Wanniassa. In 2004 he was appointed a part-time assistant bishop in the Diocese, and in 2009 was invited by Bishop Stuart Robinson to become a full-time assistant bishop and Vicar-General of the Diocese.

Edward was administrator of the Diocese between the resignation of Stuart Robinson and appointment of Mark Short.

Edwards resigned as Assistant Bishop on 11 January 2020. During 2021, Edwards took on the role of Acting Rector of St. Mark's Anglican Church Ulladulla, the southern most parish of the Anglican Diocese of Sydney.
