= Carol Wagner =

South-African born Australian Anglican bishop

The Right Reverend Carol Wagner
- Assistant Bishop, Anglican Diocese of Canberra and Goulburn
- Church: Anglican Church of Australia
- Diocese: Canberra and Goulburn
- Installed: 22 February 2020
- Term ended: 2024
- Predecessor: Trevor Edwards
- Successor: Vanessa Bennett
- Other posts: Archdeacon for the Coast, Diocese of Canberra & Goulburn (2016–2020)

Orders
- Consecration: 22 February 2020 by Peter Stuart

Personal details
- Born: 1953 or 1954 (age 71–72)
- Denomination: Anglican
- Spouse: Jay
- Children: 3 sons, 1 daughter (deceased)
- Education: Australian College of Ministries; Sydney College of Divinity

Carol Wagner (born 1953/1954) is a South-African born Australian bishop in the Anglican Church of Australia. She served as an assistant bishop in the Anglican Diocese of Canberra and Goulburn from February 2020 to 2024.

== Early life and parish ministry ==
Wagner was born in South Africa. She grew up in a non-religious family, but came to faith after what she describes as "an encounter with God" at age 15.

Until her mid-40s, Wagner was a music teacher, who ran a business with her husband offering music lessons to children in Sydney from a mobile classroom. When she and her husband sold the business they employed 23 staff and taught up to 900 students a week.

Wagner then studied theology. She obtained an Advanced Diploma in Ministry from Australian College of Ministries, Sydney, and a Bachelor of Theology from Sydney College of Divinity, through Australian College of Ministries and St Mark's National Theological Centre.

After becoming a priest, Wagner served in a number of parishes in the Anglican Diocese of Canberra and Goulburn, including Berridale and the Snowy Mountains, Taralga and North Goulburn. She became rector of the Parish of Bodalla-Narooma in 2011, a role which she held until she was consecrated as bishop.

On 27 February 2016, in addition to her parish role, Wagner was collated by Bishop Stuart Robinson as Archdeacon to the Coast, a role in which she assisted in the administration of the diocese and had oversight of Anglican churches stretching from the Victorian border to Batemans Bay.

== Episcopal ministry ==
On 28 October 2019, Wagner was appointed as the new assistant bishop of the Canberra and Goulburn Diocese, succeeding Trevor Edwards. She was consecrated bishop in St Saviour's Cathedral on 22 February 2020 by Bishop of Newcastle Peter Stuart. Wagner's role is based in Canberra and she holds particular responsibility for ministry support and the development of clergy and church workers.

At the time of her appointment as assistant bishop, Wagner criticised the Government of the Australian Capital Territory and its Education Minister Yvette Berry for abolishing chaplains in schools, claiming it was a "drive to push any whisper of Christian teaching out of schools". She considered her appointment to be a "big deal" because of the Anglican Church's conservative history and that the appointment of women priests "enriched" the church.

== Personal life ==
Wagner is married to Jay and has three adult sons. Her daughter died aged 21 from a rare illness, an event which Wagner claimed helped her cling to God because he gave her hope and a family to gather around.
