= Owen Dowling =

Australian Anglican bishop (1934–2008)

The Right Reverend Owen Douglas Dowling
- Bishop of Canberra and Goulburn
- Church: Anglican Church of Australia
- Province: New South Wales
- Diocese: Canberra and Goulburn

Personal details
- Born: 11 October 1934
- Died: 7 May 2008 (aged 73)

Owen Douglas Dowling (1934 – 2008) was an Anglican bishop in Australia.

Dowling was educated at Melbourne High School and the University of Melbourne. He was a secondary school teacher until 1959. He was ordained in 1960 and was a curate at Sunshine and Deer Park in the Diocese of Melbourne. He then became the vicar of St Philip's Heidelberg West and then the precentor and organist at St Saviour's Cathedral, Goulburn. From 1968 to 1972 he was the rector of South Wagga Wagga and then the Archdeacon of Canberra.

On 25 March 1981, he was consecrated an assistant bishop in the Diocese of Canberra and Goulburn and on 15 November 1983 was elected its diocesan bishop. He was installed on 17 December 1983. In April 1992 he was charged with soliciting after allegedly approaching an off-duty police officer. Charges were dropped in August that year after Victorian Director of Public Prosecutions deemed the case not in the public interest. Dowling retired on 1 January 1993. Dowling was an early protagonist for the ordination of women.

His last positions were incumbencies in Tasmania at St James' New Town, Hobart and Christ Church, Longford.

Dowling was married to Gloria; after his death she became a novice in the Community of the Holy Name. She died in 2020.

== Publications ==
- Music and an Australian Prayer Book. AIO Press. 1978. ISBN 978-0-908089-15-4. with Lawrence Bartlett
- Searching Questions on Healing: A Christian Perspective. Order of Saint Luke The Physician in Australia. 2005. ISBN 978-0-908460-30-4. with Steven Hallam
- Power to Be Witnesses. Anglican Information Office. 1988. ISBN 978-0-949108-81-4.

Anglican Communion titles
Preceded by Cecil Warren	Bishop of Canberra and Goulburn; 1983–1992	Succeeded by George Browning
