= Bruce Schultz =

Bruce Schultz may refer to:

- Bruce Schultz (bishop) (1932–2012), Bishop of Grafton
- Bruce Schultz (footballer) (1913–1980), Australian rules footballer

== See also ==
- Bruce Scholtz (born 1958), American football player
