= Mark Short =

Australian bishop (born 1966)

The Right Reverend Mark Short
- Primate of Australia; Bishop of Canberra and Goulburn
- Church: Anglican Church of Australia
- Province: New South Wales
- Diocese: Canberra and Goulburn
- In office: 2025–present (as primate); 2019–present (as bishop)
- Predecessor: Geoffrey Smith (as primate); Stuart Robinson (as bishop)

Orders
- Ordination: 1996 (as deacon); 1997 (as priest)
- Consecration: 6 April 2019 by Glenn Davies

Personal details
- Born: 1966 or 1967 (age 58–59)
- Denomination: Anglican
- Spouse: Monica
- Children: 2
- Education: Moore Theological College (BTh [Hons]); University of Durham (PhD)

Mark Short (born 1966) is an Australian bishop in the Anglican Church of Australia. He has served as the 11th bishop of the Anglican Diocese of Canberra and Goulburn since April 2019 and since November 2025 has been the Anglican Primate of Australia.

== Early life and parish ministry ==
Prior to becoming a priest, Short worked as a Graduate Economist for the Department of Industrial Relations and as a journalist for the Sydney Morning Herald.

In 1996 he was ordained as deacon and in 1997 as priest, both in St Saviour's Cathedral, Goulburn. He served in the parish of Temora before moving to the United Kingdom to undertake a PhD at the University of Durham on "the Passover as collective memory".

Upon his return to Australia, between 2002 and 2011, Short served as Rector of the parishes of Turvey Park and Tarcutta, during which he was appointed Vocations Director Archdeacon for the Diocese of Canberra and Goulburn in 2007, followed by the Archdeacon of Wagga Wagga in 2009.

In 2011, Short became the National Director of the Bush Church Aid Society, a position which he held until his election as bishop.

== Episcopal ministry ==
On 10 November 2018, Short was elected as bishop of the Canberra and Goulburn Diocese after a vote (where Short was one of five candidates) of 124 clergy and 175 lay representatives, succeeding Stuart Robinson. Short was consecrated bishop and enthroned as Bishop of Canberra and Goulburn in St Saviour's Cathedral on 6 April 2019 by Archbishop of Sydney Glenn Davies.

As bishop, Short has called on Christians to engage with their neighbourhoods and communities rather than retreating from them. Short was one of several bishops who sent pastoral letters to parishes affected by the 2019–20 Australian bushfire season which heavily affected the diocese, expressing his shared grief.

On 19 July 2025, Short was elected primate of the Anglican Church of Australia. He succeeded Geoffrey Smith in the role on 1 November. Short is the first non-metropolitan bishop to serve as primate and the first evangelical to hold the post since Marcus Loane of Sydney retired in 1982.

== Personal life ==
Short is married to Monica, a lecturer in social work, and has two sons, Matthew and Andrew.

Anglican Communion titles
Preceded by Stuart Robinson	Bishop of Canberra and Goulburn; 2019–present	Incumbent
Preceded by Geoffrey Smith	Primate of Australia; 2025–present	Incumbent
