= Arthur Grimshaw =

Arthur Grimshaw may refer to:

- Arthur Edmund Grimshaw (1864–1913), English painter, composer and musician
- Arthur Grimshaw (priest) (1933–2019), Dean of St John's Cathedral, Anglican Diocese of Brisbane, Australia
