= John Gerard Anderson =

Scottish-born Australian educationist (1836–1911)

- Born: 12 February 1836; Orphir
- Died: 23 August 1911 (aged 75); South Brisbane
- Education: King's College, Aberdeen (MA)
- Spouse: Edith Sarah Wood (m. 1873)
- Children: 5, including Edith Susan Boyd and Maud Edith Anderson
- Parents: James Anderson (father); Susan Gerard (mother)

John Gerard Anderson ISO (12 February 1836 – 23 August 1911) was a Scottish-born Australian educationist. Emigrating to the Colony of Queensland in 1862, Anderson served various posts on its board of education and served as the 2nd Director-General of Education from 1878 to 1904.

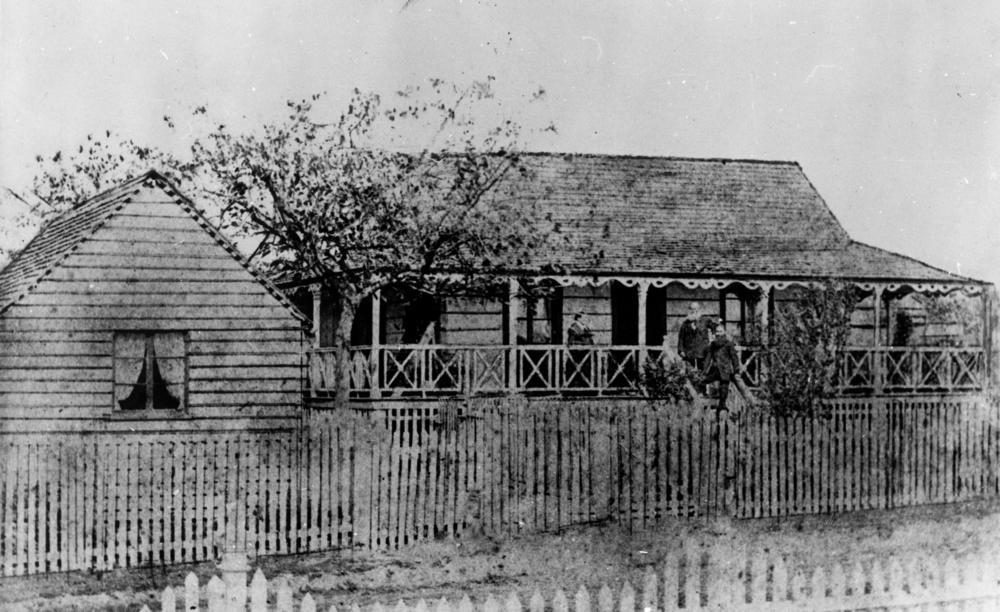
An unidentified residence in Bowen Hills, described as the residence of the first inspector of schools. (State Library of Queensland, c. 1875)

== Biography ==
=== Early life and education ===
John Gerald Anderson was born on 12 February 1836 in Orphir, a parish in Orkney, Scotland. He was the sixth child of James Anderson and Susan Anderson (née Gerard), and attended King's College, Aberdeen. He graduated with a Master of Arts in 1854. Anderson then remained there as a student of divinity.

=== Career ===
After serving as headmaster of headmaster of Spencer's School, Newcastle, Anderson emigrated to the Colony of Queensland in 1862 to accept a position on its board of education. He became the first district inspector of schools in September 1863, senior inspector in June 1869, acting general inspector in September 1874, general inspector in 1876 and under-secretary in November 1878.

Anderson served as head of the Department of Public Instruction from 1878 to 1904. He was associated with the introduction of free, compulsory and secular education, and was a member of the 1981 Royal Commission to establish the University of Queensland. Confronted by demands for change, Anderson became "cautious, conservative and autocratic" and was criticized by the 1887 royal commission as running the department in an arbitrary manner. He faced further demands for educational reforms by the turn of the century, but retired before any of them were implemented. Anderson was afterwards awarded the Imperial Service Order for "long and meritorious service".

== Private life ==
On 17 April 1873, Anderson married Edith Sarah, daughter of William Wood, reader at the Queensland Government Printing Office. They had two sons and three daughters. He died on 23 August 1911 at his home in South Brisbane. One of his daughters, artist Edith Susan Gerard Anderson, married painter Theodore Penleigh Boyd. Another, Maud Edith Anderson, married John Ashton, who became Bishop of Grafton.
