= Kenneth Clements =

The Right Reverend Kenneth John Clements
- Bishop of Grafton
- Installed: 1956
- Term ended: 1961
- Predecessor: Christopher Storrs
- Successor: Robert Gordon Arthur

Personal details
- Born: December 21, 1905
- Died: January 8, 1992 (aged 86)
- Denomination: Anglican

Kenneth John Clements (21 December 1905 - 8 January 1992) was an Anglican bishop in Australia.

Clements was educated at Highgate School and the University of Sydney. He trained for ordination at St John's College, Morpeth and was ordained in 1934 and became registrar for the Diocese of Riverina until 1937 when he was appointed Rector of Narrandera. He then held further incumbencies at Tumbarumba and Gunning. Later he was Archdeacon of Goulburn before his consecration to the episcopate as the bishop coadjutor in the Diocese of Goulburn on 29 June 1949. He succeeded, becoming diocesan Bishop of Grafton in 1956. Five years later he was translated to the (by then renamed) Diocese of Canberra and Goulburn – he was elected on 21 February, installed on 15 June 1961 and retired on 30 September 1971.

Anglican Communion titles
Preceded by Christopher Storrs	Bishop of Grafton; 1956–1961	Succeeded by Gordon Arthur
Preceded by Ernest Burgmann	Bishop of Canberra and Goulborn; 1961–1971	Succeeded by Cecil Warren
