= John Ashton (bishop) =

John Ashton.

John William Ashton (24 November 1866 – 20 March 1964) was the second Bishop of Grafton.

== Early life ==
Ashton was born in Wakefield, Yorkshire, in 1866, the son of George Ashton and his wife Fanny (née Winter).

== Career ==
Ashton was educated at Queen Elizabeth Grammar School, Wakefield and University College, Oxford, following which he was ordained deacon in 1892 and priest in 1893. He began his ordained ministry as a curate at All Saints' Church, Northampton (1892-1895), and then at St Dionysius' Church, Market Harborough (1895-1896). In 1896 he emigrated to Australia where he was Rector of St Andrew's, South Brisbane (1896-1900), Christ Church, Bundaberg (1900-1903), briefly as a curate back in England at St Peter's Church, Huddersfield (1903-1904) and Organising Secretary of the Church of England Sunday School Institute (1904-1905), and a second incumbency at St Andrew's, South Brisbane (1906-1911) and then Vicar of All Saints', East St Kilda (1911-1921) before his ordination to the episcopate. He retired as bishop in 1938.

== Personal life ==
He married Maud Edith Anderson (1874-1951) in 1898; she was the daughter of the colonial administrator John Gerard Anderson. They had three sons and two daughters. Ashton died on 20 March 1964.

Church of England titles
Preceded by Cecil Henry Druitt	Bishop of Grafton; 1921–1938	Succeeded by William Henry Webster Stevenson
