= Tom Wilmot =

Tom Wilmot is an Australian retired Anglican bishop.

Wilmot trained for the priesthood at St John's College, Morpeth. He was ordained in 1977 and served at Geraldton Spearwood and Willagee . In 2004 he became an assistant bishop in the Anglican Diocese of Perth, serving the Goldfields Country Region until 2006 and the Eastern and Rural Region from 2007.
