= Philip Huggins =

Australian bishop

Philip James Huggins (born 16 October 1948) is a bishop in the Anglican Church of Australia. He was the ninth bishop of Grafton.

== Early life ==
Huggins was educated at Monash University.

A former hippie, he was a teacher of Transcendental Meditation at the Nimbin Aquarius Festival until he had a personal encounter with the Risen Christ and became a Christian leading to him being ordained in 1977.

== Ordained career ==
He began his ordained ministry in the Diocese of Bendigo. After this he was an industrial chaplain in the Diocese of Melbourne and a chaplain at Monash University.

In 1988, he was the unsuccessful Labor candidate for the Victorian Legislative Assembly seat of Berwick.

From 1991, he was the Vicar of Williamstown, and from 1994, the Archdeacon of Essendon.

He was a regional bishop in the Diocese of Perth from 1995 to 1998, where Peter Carnley was his mentor.

He was the diocesan bishop of Grafton from 1998 to 2003. He chaired Anglicare Australia while he was there.

In 2010, Huggins was working as vicar-general in the Diocese of Ballarat. Michael Hough, in his final act before resigning as bishop of Ballarat due to bullying allegations, attempted to sack Huggins, prompting the archbishop of Melbourne, Philip Freier, to intervene and revoke the sacking.

He has been a regional bishop in the Diocese of Melbourne since that time.

== Personal life ==
He is married to Elizabeth Cuming, a psychologist and artist.

He is friends with Russell Crowe.

== Positions ==
=== Churchmanship ===
A liberal Anglo-Catholic, he regarded Pope Francis highly. Despite his liberalism, he has orthodox beliefs regarding the resurrection of Christ.

He promotes meditation accompanied with Christian social action. In 2025, he was the master of ceremonies for the multi-faith Inner Peace and Outer Peace gathering.

=== Social Gospel ===
Huggins is the chair of the Anglican Diocese of Melbourne's Social Responsibility Committee and Multi-Cultural Ministry Committee, and Chair of Board of Brotherhood of St Laurence. He is co-Chair of Christian World Service Commission (ACT for Peace), board member of St Laurence Community Services and a member of the Australian Churches Anti-Gambling Taskforce. He is on the Board of the Centre of Dialogue (La Trobe University) and the Australian Intercultural Society Advisory Board.

In 2025, he offered a message of support to Mariann Budde, after she gave a sermon in support of immigrants and LGBT people in the presence of Donald Trump.

He has voiced opposition to the AFL playing games on Good Friday.

=== Indigenous affairs and colonialism ===
He supported the Indigenous Voice to Parliament referendum and the Uluru Statement From the Heart. In 2020, he led prayer at the National Solemn Assembly for the Healing of the Land.

He also supports the West Papuans' call for self-determination and independence.

=== Environmentalism ===
An environmentalist, he is the Patron of Australian Religious Response to Climate Change. He is also a member of the United Nations Framework Convention on Climate Change Interfaith Liaison Committee and uses this role to pressure political leaders on climate change. In 2018, he opposed the establishment of the Adani Coal Mine in north Queensland.

=== Ecumenism ===
Huggins is the former chair of the Anglican General Synod Ecumenical Relations Committee. He is a leader in interfaith dialogue.

He is the President of the National Council of Churches in Australia and Director of the Centre for Ecumenical Studies at the Australian Centre for Christianity and Culture and has worked for Christian unity.

=== Refugees and immigrant affairs ===
Huggins has also protested on behalf of refugees and asylum seekers.

In 2012, he raised concerns about the Federal Labor Government's "Significant Investor" visa programme, fearing it threatened Australia's "national character".

He has interacted with the South Sudanese community in Melbourne and offered support when they have lost their children to gangs or faced media criticism.

In 2023, he held a joint service with leaders of Melbourne's Hare Krishna community to promote safety in places of worship.

Also in 2023, he attended a function for world peace organised by Melbourne's Indian community and supported ongoing efforts to strengthen the relationship between the two countrues.

He is an opponent of antisemitism.

=== Consistent life ethic and Christian pacifism ===
Huggins upholds the sanctity of life and is an opponent of euthanasia.

He is a member of the National Executive of Religions for Peace Australia.

He became the secretary of the Australian chapter of the Anglican Pacifist Fellowship after the retirement of David Thawley.

Anglican Communion titles
Preceded by Bruce Allen Schultz	Bishop of Grafton; 1998–2003	Succeeded by Keith Francis Slater
