= Gordon Arthur (bishop) =

Robert Gordon Arthur (17 August 1909 – 9 June 1992) was an Anglican bishop in Australia who was the Bishop of Grafton from 1961 to 1973.

Arthur was educated at Devonport High School for Boys and the University of Melbourne (BA 1930, MA 1934). From 1931 to 1949 he was a Methodist minister. He was ordained as an Anglican deacon and priest in 1949. After ordination he was a curate at St Saviour's Cathedral, Goulburn, New South Wales (1949–1950), and then rector of Berridale, New South Wales (1950–1953). After this he was rector of St John's, Canberra and was later the Archdeacon of Canberra. From 1956 to 1961 he was an assistant bishop in the Diocese of Canberra and Goulburn. He was then Bishop of Grafton (1961–1973).

On retirement from Grafton, he became rector of St Philip's, O'Connor, Canberra (1973–1974). He then moved to England, where he was priest-in-charge of the parish of Bratton in Wiltshire (1975–1978) and rural dean of Heytesbury in the same county (1976–1977). His final ministry was as an assistant bishop in the Diocese of Sheffield (1978–1980).

Anglican Communion titles
Preceded by Kenneth John Clements	Bishop of Grafton; 1961–1973	Succeeded by Donald Shearman
