= Donald Shearman =

Australian Anglican bishop (1926–2019)

- Bishop of Rockhampton (1963–1971); Bishop of Grafton (1973–1985)
- Church: Anglican Church of Australia
- Province: Queensland (1963–1971); New South Wales (1973–1985)
- Diocese: Rockhampton (1963–1971); Grafton (1973–1985)
- Predecessor: Theodore McCall (Rockhampton); Gordon Arthur (Grafton)
- Successor: John Grindrod (Rockhampton); Bruce Schultz (Grafton)

Orders
- Ordination: 1950
- Consecration: 24 February 1964

Personal details
- Born: Donald Norman Shearman; 6 February 1926
- Died: 2019 (aged 92–93)
- Denomination: Anglican

Donald Norman Shearman (6 February 1926–2019) was an Australian former Anglican bishop who was Bishop of Rockhampton from 1963 to 1971 and Bishop of Grafton from 1973 to 1985. In 2004, a church tribunal found Shearman guilty of misconduct for sexually abusing a schoolgirl while serving as a boarding master at an Anglican hostel in Forbes, New South Wales, in the 1950s. On 25 August 2004, Shearman became the first member of the clergy in the Anglican Church of Australia to be deposed from holy orders as a result of that finding.

Shearman was educated at Orange High School. After World War II service with the Royal Australian Air Force he studied for the priesthood at St John's Theological College, Morpeth. Ordained in 1950, his first post was a curacy at Dubbo. Later he was warden of St John's Hostel, Forbes, then rector of Coonabarabran. His last post before being ordained to the episcopate was as archdeacon of Mildura. In 1963 he became Bishop of Rockhampton, (he was consecrated a bishop on 24 February 1964 at St John's Cathedral (Brisbane)) a post he held for eight years. After two years as chairman of the Australian Board of Missions he became Bishop of Grafton in 1973, serving until 1985. He resigned his holy orders in 2003 and was later deposed from his orders. The handling of the case by then Archbishop of Brisbane, Peter Hollingworth, led in part to Hollingworth's later resignation as Governor-General of Australia in 2003.

Shearman was the subject of a submission to the Royal Commission into Institutional Responses to Child Sexual Abuse. In 2007, Shearman's OBE that he was awarded in 1978 was revoked, following his deposition from holy orders for sexual assault.

Shearman died in late 2019.

Anglican Communion titles
Preceded by Theodore Bruce McCall	Bishop of Rockhampton; 1963–1971	Succeeded by John Grindrod
Preceded by Robert Gordon Arthur	Bishop of Grafton; 1973–1985	Succeeded by Bruce Schultz
