= Stephen Pickard =

Australian academic and Anglican bishop (born 1952)

The Right Reverend Professor Stephen Pickard
- Assistant bishop, Anglican Diocese of Canberra and Goulburn
- Church: Anglican Church of Australia
- Diocese: Canberra & Goulburn
- In office: 24 March 2012 – 31 March 2022
- Other post(s): Assistant bishop, Diocese of Adelaide (2007–2010)

Orders
- Consecration: 2007

Personal details
- Born: 1952 (age 72–73)

Stephen Kim Pickard (born 1952) is an Australian academic and retired Anglican bishop, who served as an assistant bishop in the Anglican Diocese of Canberra and Goulburn since 24 March 2012, and as Executive Director of the Australian Centre for Christianity and Culture (part of the Faculty of Arts and Education at Charles Sturt University) from September 2013 until March 2022. He was consecrated in 2007 and previously served as an assistant bishop in the Diocese of Adelaide from 2007 to 2010, and as head of St Mark's National Theological Centre (and head of the School of Theology at Charles Sturt University) from 1998 to 2006.

Pickard held a number of roles in relation to the Anglican Communion. Between 2001 and 2007 he served on the Communion’s Theological and Doctrinal Commission (IATDC). When the theological, doctrinal and ecumenical work of the Anglican Communion was gathered together under the Inter-Anglican Standing Commission on Unity, Faith and Order (IASCUFO), Pickard was then appointed a member of the Commission, serving as Vice-Chair from 2009, and taking over as Chair in 2018. From 2010 Pickard was also a member of the Steeering Group of Theological Education in the Anglican Communion (TEAC).

Pickard retired from his role as assistant bishop in the Diocese of Canberra and Goulburn and Executive Director of the Australian Centre for Christianity and Culture on 31 March 2022. Prior to his retirement, on 8 March 2022 Pickard was awarded the Cross of St Augustine for "significant service to the Anglican Communion as a theologian, teacher and bishop, and in particular in his service of the Inter-Anglican Theological and Doctrinal Commission and the Inter-Anglican Standing Commission on Unity, Faith and Order".

In response to the GAFCON Kigali statement, Pickard took on the role of Chair of the newly formed National Comprehensive Anglicanism Network, a group intended to counterbalance the voice of GAFCON Australia and the Anglican Diocese of Sydney in the life of the Anglican Church of Australia.

== Books ==
- Pickard, Stephen (2009). Theological foundations for collaborative ministry. Explorations in practical, pastoral and empirical theology). Farnham, Surrey, England: Ashgate Publishing Limited. pp. 266. ISBN 9780754668350.
- ———— (2011). In-between God: Theology, community and discipleship. Adelaide: AFT Press/Theology. p. 276. ISBN 9781921817113.
- ———— (2012). Seeking the church: An introduction to ecclesiology. London: SCM Press. p. 255. ISBN 9780334052593.
