= John Nurser =

Anglican theologian (1929–2020)

John Shelley Nurser (26 May 1929 – 16 November 2020) was a Church of England priest who was an eminent theologian.

== Early life ==
Nurser was born in 1929 in Far Cotton, Northamptonshire, to Arthur Nurser, a joiner, and his wife Florence (née Shelley), a milliner. In his childhood the family moved to Rugeley, Staffordshire, and Nurser went to Rugeley Grammar School. From there he went to Peterhouse, Cambridge, gaining a double first in history.

== Career ==
He spent his National Service (1950–53) at the Royal Naval College, Greenwich as an Instructor Lieutenant in History and English. He then returned to Peterhouse to undertake research on Lord Acton. Nurser was a Commonwealth Fund Fellow at Harvard Divinity School (1956–57), studying under the philosopher-theologian Paul Tillich. Awarded a PhD in 1958, he spent a year at Wells Theological College, and was ordained deacon in 1958, and priest in 1959. He served his title at St Peter's, Tankerseley (1958–61). Nurser returned to Cambridge to become Dean of Trinity Hall (1961–68), and then became the first Warden of the new St Mark's Institute of Theology in Canberra, Australia (1968–74). After a short period as Rector of St Andrew's, Freckenham (of which the patron is Peterhouse) and All Saints, Worlington in Suffolk (1974–76), he was then appointed Canon Chancellor at Lincoln Cathedral and head of Lincoln Theological College.

He left Lincoln in 1992, in the aftermath of the debacle of the Chapter's ruinously expensive exhibition of its Magna Carta at Expo 88 in Brisbane, Queensland. His last incumbency was as Priest-in-Charge of St Mary's, Shudy Camps with All Saints, Castle Camps in Cambridgeshire (1992–95), following which he retired to his mother's childhood home of Sudbury.

He was awarded the Albert C. Outler Prize by the American Society of Church History in 2005 for his study of the Christian origins of the United Nations Charter on human rights.

== Personal life ==
Nurser married Elizabeth Kimber in 1956. There were four children. He died in 2020, aged 91.
