= Sarah Macneil =

Retired Anglican bishop in Australia

The Right Reverend Sarah Macneil
- Bishop of Grafton
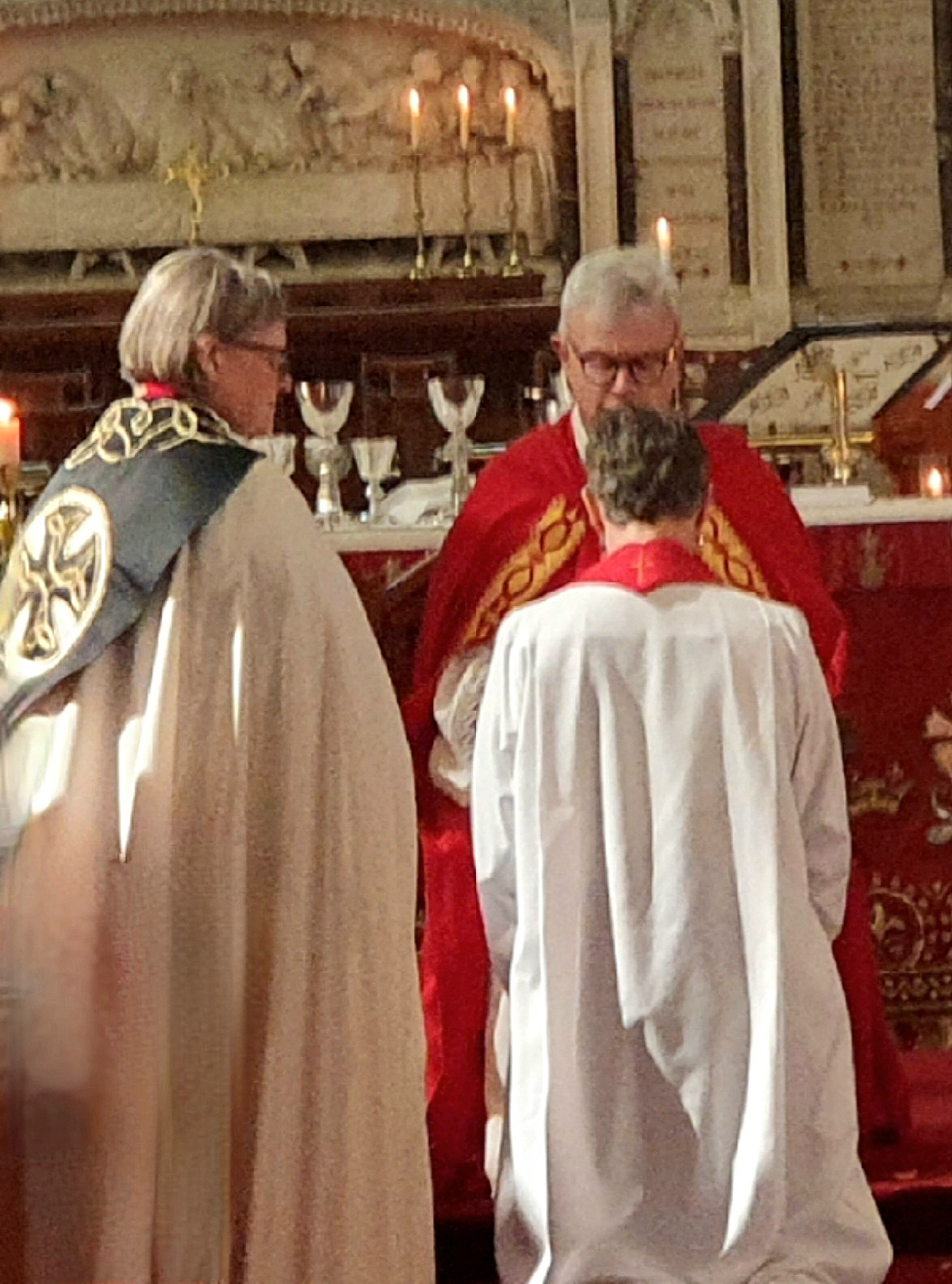
- Bishop Sarah Macneil about to lay hands on and pray for Bishop Vanessa Bennett at her consecration
- Church: Anglican Church of Australia
- Province: Province of New South Wales
- Diocese: Grafton
- In office: 2014 to 2018
- Predecessor: Keith Slater
- Successor: Murray Harvey

Orders
- Consecration: 1 March 2014

Personal details
- Born: 1955 (age 70–71)
- Denomination: Anglicanism

Sarah Macneil (born 1955) is a retired Anglican bishop in Australia. She was the Bishop of Grafton in the Anglican Church of Australia. She was consecrated and installed as bishop on 1 March 2014, becoming the first woman in Australia to lead a diocese.

== Life and ministry ==
Sarah Macneil was born and grew up in Canberra. She has been a life-long Anglican.

Prior to being ordained as an Anglican priest, Macneil served as a diplomat. She worked in Australia and overseas in appointments with the Commonwealth Department of Foreign Affairs and the Department of Trade.

She was the dean of St Peter's Cathedral, Adelaide, from 2009 to 2011 and served as an archdeacon in the Diocese of Canberra-Goulburn. At the time of her election as bishop, she was serving as the senior associate priest at Holy Covenant Anglican Church located near the Jamison Centre in Cook, Australian Capital Territory.

She is married to Ian Chaplin.

== Election as bishop ==
In 2013, Macneil was elected unanimously as the 11th bishop of the Diocese of Grafton, located in northern New South Wales. The diocese includes Anglican churches from Port Macquarie northwards to the New South Wales border with Queensland.

Her election made history, as Macneil became the first woman in the Anglican Church of Australia to be selected as a diocesan bishop. This meant she had direct responsibility for overseeing the affairs of the churches in her area. Five years earlier, Kay Goldsworthy had been elected as the first woman bishop in the Anglican Church of Australia; she served as the assistant bishop of Perth in her first assignment and did not become a diocesan bishop until 2017, when she was elected Bishop of Gippsland.

Macneil was consecrated at Christ Church Cathedral in Grafton on 2 March 2014. Hundreds of people attended the service.

Macneil took on the role of bishop at a tumultuous time in the life of the diocese. The prior bishop, Keith Slater, had resigned in 2013 in the wake of a scandal around his handling of sex-abuse cases. His resignation came just prior to the commencement of an investigation by a royal commission into sexual abuse at the North Coast Children's home, which was run by the diocese and under Slater's jurisdiction.

On 3 November 2017, Macneil announced her resignation as Bishop of Grafton, effective from 3 March 2018, citing medical advice.

== See also ==
- Ordination of women
- Ordination of women in the Anglican communion
