= Cecil Warren =

Bishop of Canberra and Goulburn

Cecil Allan Warren (25 February 1924 - 13 September 2019) was an Anglican bishop in Australia.

Warren was educated at the University of Sydney (BA 1951) and The Queen's College, Oxford (BA 1956, MA 1959), and ordained deacon in 1950 and priest in 1951. His first post was a curacy at St John's, Adaminaby (1950-51) and then its Priest-in-Charge (1951-53). He was then a curate at St Mary the Virgin, Oxford (1955-57) and St John's, Canberra (1957-60). He was then the first Rector of St Philip, O'Connor, Canberra (1960-63). From 1963 to 1965 he was Organising Secretary of the Church Society and Director of the Forward in Faith Movement (not to be confused with the later, and unrelated, Forward in Faith).

On 21 September 1965, he was consecrated an assistant bishop within the Diocese of Canberra and Goulburn and on 15 November 1971 was elected its diocesan bishop. He was installed on 31 January 1972 and retired on 5 September 1983. He was then Team Rector of St Peter and St Paul's Church, Old Brampton and an Assistant Bishop in the Diocese of Derby in the Church of England (1983-89).

Church of England titles
Preceded by Kenneth Clements	Bishop of Canberra and Goulburn; 1972–1983	Succeeded by Owen Dowling
