= St Mark's National Theological Centre =

Theological college in Australia

St Marks National Theological Centre
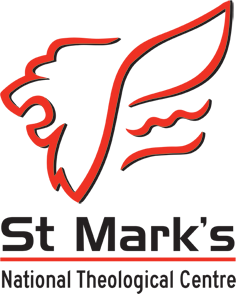
- Type: Theological College
- Established: 24 February 1957
- Founder: Ernest Burgmann
- Accreditation: Charles Sturt University, RTO
- Affiliations: Anglican Diocese of Canberra and Goulburn
- Academic affiliations: CSU School of Theology
- Principal: Jacqueline Service
- Location: Barton, ACT; 35.30506°S 149.13773°E
- Website: https://stmarks.edu.au/

St Mark's National Theological Centre is a theological college in Australia. It is owned and operated by the Anglican Diocese of Canberra and Goulburn.

== History ==
Ernest Burgmann, Bishop of Goulburn from 1934 and then the renamed Canberra & Goulburn (1950-1960), established St Mark's Library in 1957. In 1967 this was expanded to become St Mark's Institute of Theology. Burgmann himself was the first warden of the Library (1957-1960). The first warden of the new institute was John Nurser (1968-1974), an Englishman who had previously been Dean of Trinity Hall, Cambridge and would go on to be the head of Lincoln Theological College. The institute merged with the Canberra College of Ministry in 1987, to form St Mark's National Theological Centre.

In 2009, the Anglican Diocese of Adelaide's St Barnabas' College and the Anglican Diocese of Brisbane's St Francis' College joined the CSU School of Theology through an affiliation agreement with St Marks. This arrangement ceased at the end of 2022, when both St Barnabas' and St Francis' Colleges joined the University of Divinity.

In addition to the St Mark's campus in Canberra, the CSU's School of Theology also has another campus at North Parramatta, run by United Theological College (Sydney). The membership of these two colleges in the CSU School of Theology is notable, given the more Evangelical inclinations of St Mark's and the Anglican Diocese of Canberra and Goulburn, as against the Progressive Christianity embraced by UTC and the Uniting Church in Australia, Synod of New South Wales and the ACT.

== Courses ==
The centre delivers courses in higher education and vocational education and training (VET). Its courses in the higher education sector are offered through its partnership with Charles Sturt University's (CSU) School of Theology. St Mark's is in Canberra, adjacent to Lake Burley Griffin in the Parliament House precinct.

The Canberra campus is home to St Mark's National Memorial Library which was established in 1957 by Bishop Ernest Burgmann and is now estimated at around 100,000 items.

== Australian Centre for Christianity and Culture ==
The adjacent Australian Centre for Christianity and Culture is affiliated to the United Theological College and St Mark's. The ACCC itself is located on the site of the intended national Anglican church, at one stage proposed to be a cathedral, and dedicated as St Mark's in 1927. In 1955 it was proposed to be a collegiate church, modelled upon Westminster Abbey. The long and complicated history of the national church site led, eventually, to the establishment of St Mark's Library.

== Directors of the Centre ==
- Bruce Wilson, 1984–89. Subsequently Bishop of Bathurst.
- Colin Dundon, 1990-95
- Jeffrey Driver, later bishop of Adelaide, 1995–97.
- Stephen Pickard, 1998–2006. Subsequently, an assistant bishop in Adelaide, and then Canberra & Goulburn.
- Tom Frame, 2006–14. Formerly bishop to the Australian Defence Forces.
- Andrew Cameron, 2014-23.
- Jacqueline Service, 2025-
