= Cecil Druitt =

Australian Anglican bishop (1875–1921)

Cecil Henry Druitt (16 August 1875 – 26 July 1921) was the first Anglican Bishop of Grafton in New South Wales, Australia.

== Early life ==
Druitt was born in 1875 in Stockbridge, Hampshire, the son of the Rev William Crawley Druitt and his wife Caroline (née Leach).

== Clerical career ==
He was educated at Clifton College and Corpus Christi College, Cambridge. He trained for ordination at Ridley Hall, Cambridge, and was ordained deacon in 1898 and priest in 1899.

He began his ordained ministry as a curate at Christ Church, Torquay (1898-1900). In 1900 he became a lecturer in Hebrew at the Church Mission Society college in Islington. He was later Rector of St Bride's Stretford and then Vicar of St Mary's Overchurch. In 1911 he became Coadjutor Bishop of Grafton and Armidale and, when the diocese was divided in 1914, Bishop of the Grafton portion.

Druitt attended the Lambeth Conference in 1920 and remained in England for twelve months, arriving back in May 1921. He suffered from diabetes and died in post on 26 July 1921.

== Personal life ==
He married Eleanor Law Mathews in 1904.

== Legacy ==
A school in Coffs Harbour, Bishop Druitt College, is named after Dr Druitt.

Church of England titles
Preceded by Inaugural appointment	Bishop of Grafton; 1914 –1921	Succeeded by John William Ashton
