= George Browning (bishop) =

Bishop of Canberra and Goulburn

The Right Reverend George Browning
- Bishop of Canberra and Goulburn
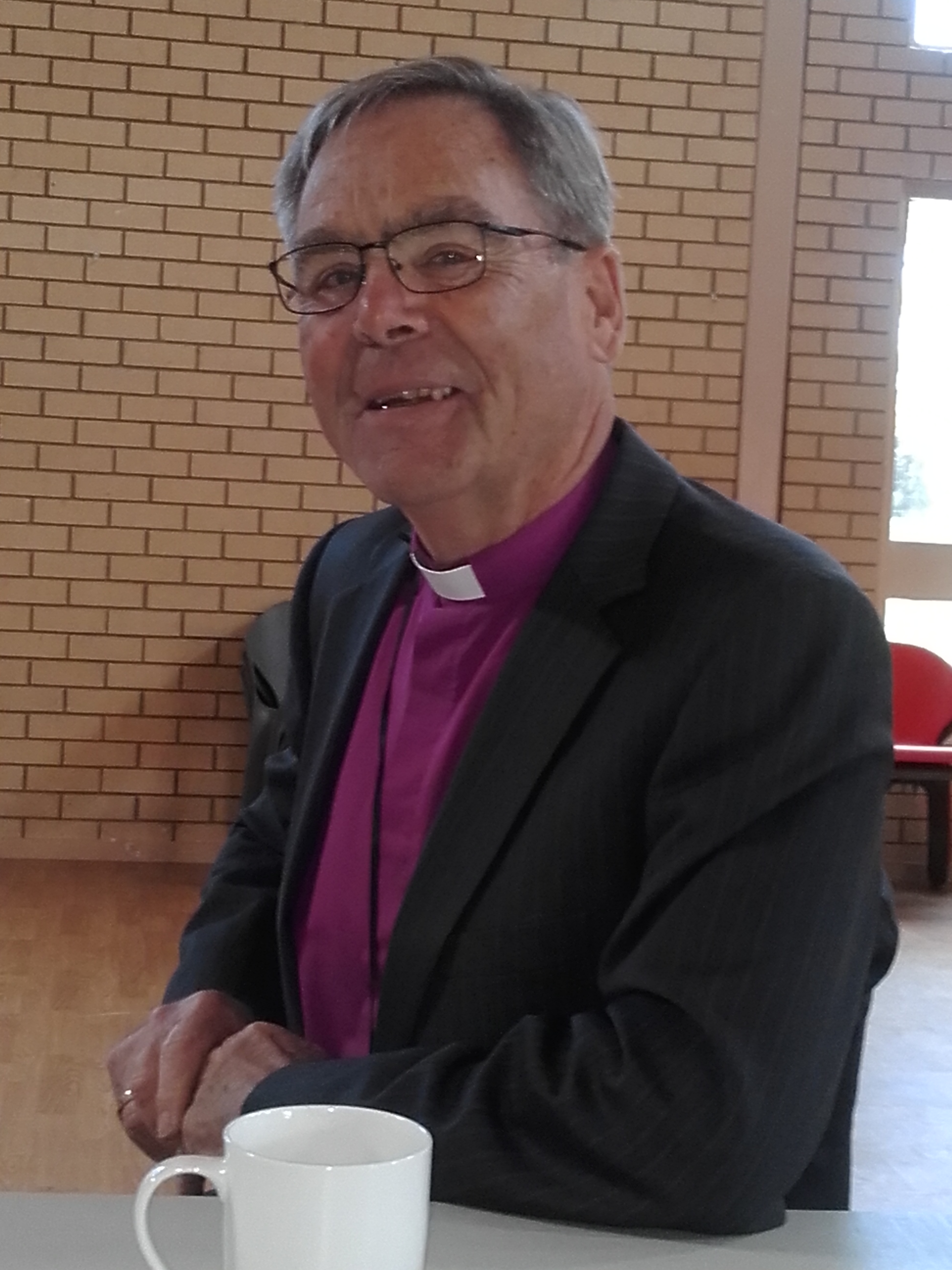
- Browning in 2016
- Church: Anglican Church of Australia
- Diocese: Canberra and Goulburn
- In office: 1993–2008
- Predecessor: Owen Dowling
- Successor: Stuart Robinson
- Other posts: Assistant bishop, Diocese of Brisbane (Northern Region) (1985–1993)

Orders
- Ordination: 1966 (as deacon); 1967 (as priest)
- Consecration: 21 September 1985 by John Grindrod

Personal details
- Born: 28 September 1942 (age 84) Brighton, United Kingdom
- Denomination: Anglican
- Spouse: Margaret
- Children: 5
- Education: St John's College; Charles Sturt University

George Victor Browning (born 28 September 1942) is a retired British-Australian Anglican bishop who served as the 9th Bishop of Canberra and Goulburn in the Anglican Church of Australia. He was elected on 31 January 1993 and installed on 30 May 1993. He retired in 2008.

== Early life and family ==
Browning was born in Brighton, England. His family were dairy farmers in Sussex.

== Education ==
Browning attended Ardingly College and Lewes County Grammar School before moving to Australia in 1960. After working as a jackaroo and stud groom he studied at St John's Theological College, Morpeth, in New South Wales, where he obtained a Licentiate in Theology with first class honours. He was ordained deacon in 1966 and priest in 1967. He subsequently obtained a Bachelor of Theology with Honours and Doctor of Philosophy from Charles Sturt University. His doctorate, an examination of an ethical response to climate change from the perspective of the biblical concept of Sabbath is published as Sabbath and the Common Good. In 2007 he was awarded a Doctor of Letters (Honoris Causa) for his contribution to education.

== Ordained ministry ==
Browning became assistant priest in Inverell in 1966, assistant priest at St Peter's Cathedral, Armidale, in 1968, and vicar of Warialda in 1969. In 1973 he became vice-principal of St John's Theological College, Morpeth, and then principal in 1974. In 1976 he became rector of Singleton. He was appointed Archdeacon of the Upper Hunter in 1982. In 1984 he became rector of Woy Woy and Archdeacon of the Central Coast of New South Wales. He was consecrated as assistant bishop on 21 September 1985 at St John's Cathedral in Brisbane and served as Bishop of the Northern Region (an assistant bishop) in the Diocese of Brisbane until 1992 when he became responsible for the Coastal Region. From 1988 to 1991 he was also principal of St Francis' Theological College, Milton, Queensland.

Browning was elected Bishop of Canberra and Goulburn on 31 January 1993 and installed on 30 May 1993.

In 1997, with Sir William Deane and Lowitja O'Donoghue, Browning founded the Australian Centre for Christianity and Culture in Barton, Canberra. Its administrative building has subsequently been named George Browning House.

In 2000 he was awarded the Australian Centenary Medal for his contribution to the community.

In 1999 Browning resigned as Bishop of Canberra and Goulburn after he revealed he had had an adulterous relationship with a female parishioner 15 years earlier. At the request of his synod he withdrew the resignation and retired in 2008.

In May 2008 the Bishop of Salisbury, England, licensed him as priest in charge of the Wriggle Valley benefice in the county of Dorset, where he remained for a year.

== Social views ==
Following controversy within the Australian Anglican Church, in response to the impending appointment of an openly gay Anglican bishop in the United States, Browning condemned the debate on sexuality as an "appalling," "irrelevant," "pathetic" waste of time.

In 2005, Browning became convenor of the Anglican Communion Environmental Network. In 2007 he had a public disagreement with Cardinal George Pell on the topic of climate change, saying, "Dr Pell's position on global warming defied scientific consensus and theological imperatives to protect the Earth and its future generations. It also made no sense and would be proven a mistake." In 2011, Browning met with the Prime Minister of Australia, Julia Gillard, to support a carbon tax. He said his organisation, Australian Religious Response to Climate Change, wanted to assist politicians to create good legislation as this is a moral issue,

Prior to a United Nations' climate change meeting in Paris in December 2015, Browning was a signatory to a letter calling on world leaders to discuss a ban on new coalmines and coalmine expansions.

Browning supports indigenous land rights saying that it is "doubly important" for Australians to make a commitment to support the wider Aboriginal [land-title] requests.

Browning is the patron and former president of the Australia Palestine Advocacy Network. He has been a frequent visitor to Palestine and has hosted Palestinian leaders in Australia. Browning is an advocate for Boycott, Divestment and Sanctions against Israel for its illegal settlement programme in the Palestinian Territories.

== Personal life ==
Browning and his wife Margaret have three adult sons (Philip, Richard and Timothy) and two daughters (Pat and Chris).

== See also ==
- Israel–Palestine relations
- Israeli–Palestinian conflict
