= Arthur Grimshaw (priest) =

Dean of Brisbane

Arthur John Grimshaw (born Port Fairy, Victoria 9 February 1933; died Brisbane 6 September 2019) was the Australian Dean of St John's Cathedral, Brisbane from 1985 to 1998.

He was educated at St John's College, Morpeth and the University of Melbourne, graduating BA in 1957.

He was ordained as a priest in 1958 and first served as a curate in Surrey Hills. He was appointed Assistant Chaplain at Geelong Grammar School from 1959 to 1961, vicar of Romsey and Sunbury with Lancefield from 1961 to 1964 and Precentor at St George's Cathedral, Perth from 1964 to 1968. He was then Rector of Holy Trinity, Fortitude Valley (1968–1975), Rector of St Paul's, Ipswich (1975–1980), Archdeacon at Moreton (1975–1983), Rector of St Augustine's, Hamilton (1980–1985) before becoming Dean of Brisbane from 1985 to 1998. After that he was Dean Emeritus.
