= Christ Church Cathedral, Grafton =

- Cathedral Church of Christ the King
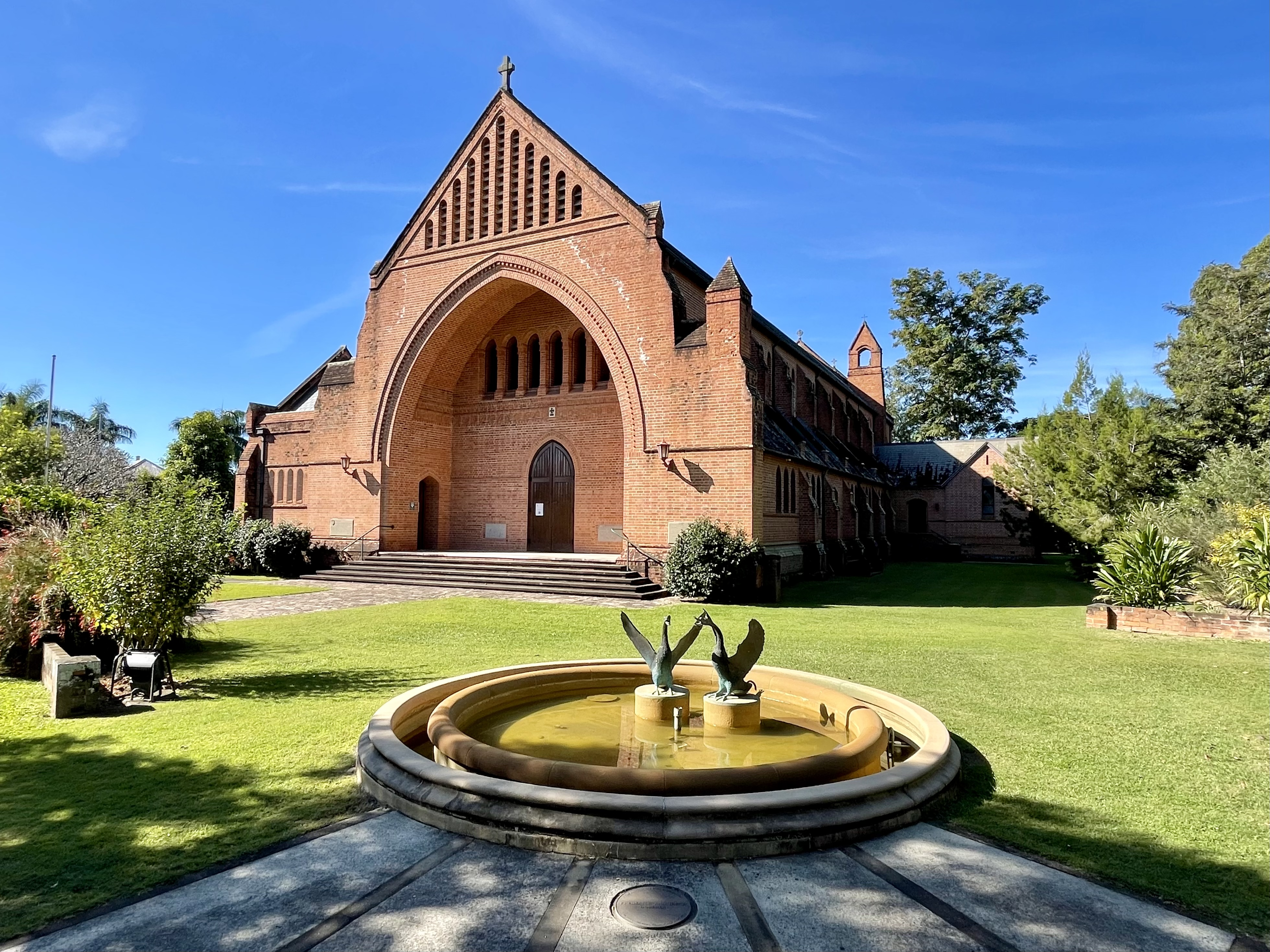
- Cathedral Church of Christ the King, in 2021

- Location in New South Wales
- 29°41′35″S 152°56′06″E
- Location: Duke Street, Grafton, New South Wales
- Country: Australia
- Denomination: Anglican
- Website: www.graftoncathedral.org.au

History
- Status: Cathedral
- Founded: June 1974
- Founder: Bishop James Francis Turner
- Dedicated: 25 July 1884 by Archbishop Alfred Barry

Architecture
- Functional status: Active
- Architect: John Horbury Hunt (Cathedral)
- Architectural type: Victorian Gothic Revival
- Years built: 1874–1884

Specifications
- Materials: English bond salmon bricks

Administration
- Diocese: Grafton

Clergy
- Bishop: Right Rev. Dr Murray Harvey
- Dean: Very Rev Naomi Cooke

New South Wales Heritage Register
- Official name: Cathedral Church of Christ the King (inc. hall and cottages); Christ Church Cathedral; Grafton Anglican Cathedral
- Type: State heritage (complex / group)
- Designated: 14 March 2003
- Reference no.: 1654
- Type: Cathedral
- Category: Religion
- Builders: G J T Lawson (woodwork), Reynold Brothers (brickwork)

Christ Church Cathedral is a heritage-listed Anglican cathedral complex at Duke Street, Grafton, Clarence Valley Council, New South Wales, Australia. The cathedral was designed by John Horbury Hunt and built from 1874 to 1884 by Reynold Brothers (brickwork) and G. J. T. Lawson (woodwork). It is also known as Cathedral Church of Christ the King and Grafton Anglican Cathedral. The property is owned by the Anglican Diocese of Grafton. It was added to the New South Wales State Heritage Register on 14 March 2003.

== History ==
Bishop James Francis Turner, the Bishop of Grafton and Armidale had designs prepared by the firm Carpenter And Slater, but this was abandoned and he commissioned architect John Horbury Hunt to prepare alternative designs.

Hunt began designing the Cathedral Church of Christ the King, or Christ Church Cathedral as early as 1870. However, when Turner raised the matter, the congregation at Grafton rejected the plans because of the cost involved.

In June 1874 Bishop Turner spread the mortar for the foundation stone and Hunt lowered and placed it in position. The foundation stone was laid on a cleared part of the Victoria and Duke Street site. It was not until 1878 when the Rev. Charles Capel Greenway became Archdeacon of Grafton that fundraising for the building began in earnest. Greenway was the son of colonial architect Francis Greenway. The time of the cathedral's construction, 1874–84, was a boom time for the development of Grafton city.

In May 1879 Hunt was commissioned to prepare detailed designs for the superstructure. Concrete foundations were laid for four bays of the nave, the chancel, a side chapel and the north and south vestry transepts, in 1880.

Embedded in the foundations were large sandstone blocks brought from Eatonville, New South Wales. In June 1881 contracts were let between the Diocese and G. J. T. Lawson (for the woodwork) and Messrs Reynold Bros (for the brickwork) for the erection of the first portion of the cathedral comprising the brick walls, roof, sanctuary and first four bays of the nave. The gothic inspired building was constructed from half a million pink sandstock bricks manufactured locally by Mr Samuel George. Richard Palmer, from Grafton, supplied over 100 brick moulds to Mr George.

The first stage of the cathedral was opened and dedicated by Archbishop of Sydney Alfred Barry on St James' Day, 25 July 1884. In 1896 the great stained glass was installed and dedicated to Bishop Turner.

The foundation stone for the second-stage extension of the cathedral, comprising the last four bays of the nave and the west porch, was laid on 27 June 1934. The architect for the extension was Power Adam and Munnings from Sydney. J. F Munnings was the supervising architect and F. C. Hargrave from Grafton was the acting-supervising architect. Builders Messrs S. D. C. Kennedy and Bird Pty Ltd from Sydney completed the extension in 1937. The extensions contained approximately 300,000 hand made bricks from 100 different moulds, laid in old English style. The clay was sourced from the same pit and the moulds were the same as those used in stage one building works. The second stage extension was dedicated on 30 October 1937, to Hunt's design (this last point, in Oultram, 2015, 4).

The second-stage extension was consecrated on 14 September 1959. The extension included additions to the original plan of a choir vestry, north and south entrance floors, chancel extensions, stone flagging on the front steps and rubber tiling in the aisles. Power Adam and Munnings prepared drawings for the new vestry extension off the organ chamber in 1937.

A bell tower and chapter house designed by Hunt were never completed. The cathedral today is an imposing structure in the city, surrounded by other buildings that demonstrate the work of the church.

The Diocese of Grafton was erected as a separate diocese in 1914, and its shield of wavy blue and white lines reflects the coastal and riverine nature of the diocese. Grafton Diocese is one of the 23 which constitute the Anglican Church of Australia. It covers the coastal area south of the New South Wales-Queensland border known as the Northern Rivers Region and inland generally following intermediate ranges between the Great Dividing Range and the Pacific Ocean. There are 28 parishes.

Parish Hall (Christ Church Hall) (1881)

Constructed in 1881 and is widely purported to be designed by Horbury Hunt. However, research by the Diocesan Archivist has indicated that Bishop Turner, a trained architect, designed it.

Victorian Cottage

The Anglican Diocese of Grafton purchased this cottage between the years 1961–1973. It was purchased from the estate of the late Ada Laura Greentree. Prior to purchase it was used as a private residence.

From 1961 to 1983 it was used for offices and general parish purposes. From 1983 to 1996 it was used as a cathedral bookshop. From 1996 to 1998 it was used for general parish purposes, and since 1998 it has been used as offices for a counselling service.

Georgian Cottage

The Anglican Diocese of Grafton purchased this cottage between the years 1961–1973. Prior to 1961 it is believed to have been used as a private residence. Since 1973 it has been used for offices for staff, youth group meeting rooms and general parish purposes.

Education and Welfare Centre, shops (1996)

The Education and Welfare Centre was completed in 1996 to the design of Barrie E. Ross, building designer. It was set to the north of the cathedral, with car parking fronting Fitzroy Street.

=== Modifications and dates ===
- 1874 - the foundation stone for the cathedral is laid on 24 June.
- 1880 - concrete foundations poured
- 1881 - building commenced
- 1884 - three bays of the nave had been built and cathedral is opened and dedicated on 25 July. St. James Day.
- 1896 - great stained glass window was installed in the chancel over the high altar and dedicated to Bishop Turner.
- 1934 - The foundation stone for the second stage of the cathedral is laid on 27 June.
- 1937 - On 30 October, the second stage is dedicated.
- 1959 - The cathedral is consecrated on 14 September.
- 1976 - The Cathedral Parish Centre is completed with the addition of a hall, offices and kitchen to the existing Hunt Hall.
- 1984 - Centenary celebrations and cathedral restoration.

== Description ==
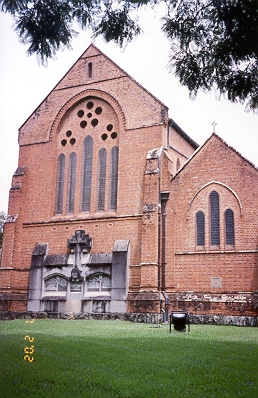
Rear view

The site occupies the corner of Fitzroy Street and Duke Street, Grafton and comprises generally grassed surrounds with a cluster of five key buildings. The cathedral is located at the site's rear, two cottages to its northern side street, the Edwards Hall and Education and Welfare Offices and shops and car parking facing Fitzroy Street north of the cathedral.

Cathedral Church

Cathedral Church of Christ the King is of Gothic architectural style and is admirably expressed in form and materials. In the words of Hunt it imitates the transition style of about 1300 AD. The cathedral is built of local salmon-pink bricks, mainly in English bond. It consists of an eight bay nave, sanctuary, side aisles, a side chapel, a baptistry, clergy vestry and choir vestry. Massive scale emphasised by use of an enormous and dramatic double archway of decorative brickwork spanning the west end. A smaller arch of similar design is in the chancel. Over 90 different patterns of ornamental brickwork were used in its completion. The nave has an open timber roof, supported by space trusses, while close spaced trusses span the sanctuary. The cathedral seats 1000 people.

Building commenced in 1881. By 1884 only three bays of the nave, the tower and the chapter house had been built. Except for the tower these were completed in 1937, to Hunt's original design, the bricks being made from the same clay and moulds as the original work. In 1896 the great stained glass window was installed in the chancel over the high altar and dedicated to Bishop Turner. It is a rich example of the work of Lyon and Cottier, Sydney.

Parish Hall (Christ Church Hall/Edwards Hall)

An attractive small, single-storey hall built of similar sand mould apricot brick as used on the cathedral and designed by architect John Horbury Hunt, built 1890. The church hall has been sympathetically conceived adjacent to the cathedral and is an attractive small church. The corrugated-iron roof, originally shingled, has two scalloped bargeboards, which may have also replaced the original pattern.

Victorian Cottage

A late Victorian single-storey brick cottage having a timber verandah all round with good decorative timber valances. The building appears to have been altered little and is in good condition.

Georgian Cottage

A three-bayed, four-roomed, stuccoed brick late Georgian single-storey cottage with an attic and three-bay verandah. The building contains most original cedar joinery. The gabled roof is corrugated iron and the verandah is timber with simple mouldings.

Cathedral Welfare and Education Centre / Bookshop and Opportunity Shop (1996);

Single-storey, modern face brick buildings with pitched, hipped corrugated-iron and flat metal roof. The Education and Welfare Centre has a wrap-around verandah to three sides. It is connected to Edwards Hall by a covered breezeway.

The physical condition of the property was reported as good as at 23 September 2002. The archaeological potential was also reported as being high at that time.

Cathedral Church of Christ the King is highly intact and has stayed closest to Hunt's original plans, with no major alterations to the design.

== Heritage listing ==
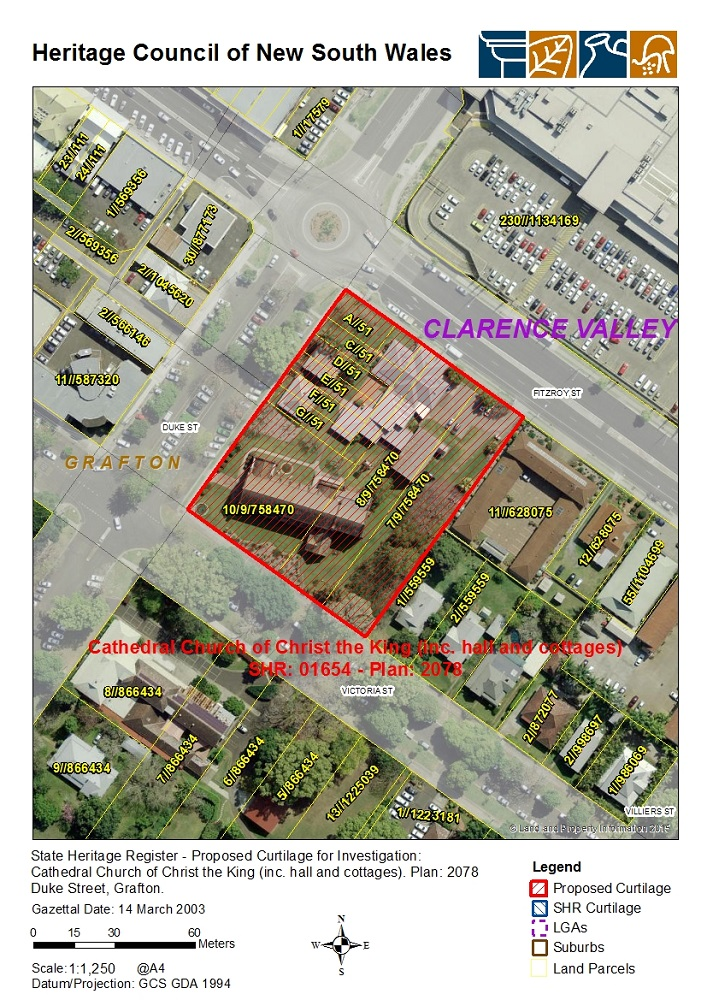
Heritage boundaries

Cathedral Church of Christ the King is of State significance as an intact example of the culmination of architect John Horbury Hunt's ecclesiastical ideas. Constructed between 1874 and 1884, Christ Church Cathedral demonstrates the growth of the Anglican Church in the Diocese of Grafton. The building demonstrates the skill and originality of Hunt's ideas and use of brickwork, form and asymmetrical balance, culminating in the mighty western archway. Hunts use of adjustable and fixed wooden louvers instead of glass is purported to be the first attempt to alleviate the problem of heat in any public building in Australia.

Cathedral Church of Christ the King was listed on the New South Wales State Heritage Register on 14 March 2003 having satisfied the following criteria.

The place is important in demonstrating the course, or pattern, of cultural or natural history in New South Wales.

Cathedral Church of Christ the King was constructed between 1874 and 1884, a boom time for the city of Grafton. It demonstrates the growth of a small parish church to the mother church of the Anglican Diocese of Grafton. Grafton's Cathedral traces its beginnings back to the early 1840s when Anglican clergymen under the Bishop of Australia came to the isolated settlements of the Northern Rivers.

The place has a strong or special association with a person, or group of persons, of importance of cultural or natural history of New South Wales's history.

Cathedral Church of Christ the King is associated with the renowned architect John Horbury Hunt.

The place is important in demonstrating aesthetic characteristics and/or a high degree of creative or technical achievement in New South Wales.

Cathedral Church of Christ the King has aesthetic significance at a State level as an example of the culmination of architect John Horbury Hunt's ecclesiastical ideas. It is significant for its simplification of brickwork, the scale of the west end entrance double archway, the interior arches and the attention to ventilation in the hot Grafton climate. Hunts use of adjustable and fixed wooden louvers instead of glass is purported to be the first attempt to alleviate the problem of heat in any public building in Australia.

The place has strong or special association with a particular community or cultural group in New South Wales for social, cultural or spiritual reasons.

Cathedral Church of Christ the King is integral to the identification of the sense of place for the Grafton community and is valued by the Anglican community as a symbol of religious worship and parish administration in the Northern Rivers region. By being a cathedral, the City of Grafton came to city status. The significance and high esteem held for the cathedral and its architecture has been held for many years and is demonstrated through the 1930s additions to the cathedral that were faithful to Hunt's intentions by use of the clay from the same pit and same moulds to make the bricks.

The place has potential to yield information that will contribute to an understanding of the cultural or natural history of New South Wales.

Cathedral Church of Christ the King has high archaeological potential and is an important example and benchmark of the ecclesiastical architecture of John Horbury Hunt.

The place possesses uncommon, rare or endangered aspects of the cultural or natural history of New South Wales.

Cathedral Church of Christ the King is one three large ecclesiastical commissions of the architect John Horbury Hunt (the others being the cathedrals at Armidale and Newcastle).

== Sub-Deans and Canon Residentiaries ==
Until 1949, the Bishop was formally the Dean, and the cathedral incumbent was the Sub-Dean.

- Charles Capel Greenway, 1884–1893. Greenway was the son of the noted convict-architect Francis Greenway.
- Willoughby Flower, 1893–1897. Flower was later the Rector of St Mark's Church, Darling Point in Sydney where, in 1914 and whilst temporarily mentally deranged, he shot himself, and died.
- Robert Julius Moxon, 1897–1910.
- Charles Frederick Seymour, 1910–1917. Seymour was the father of Charles Read Seymour, who played first-class cricket in England.
- Arthur Benjamin Tress, 1917–1923.
- Henry Stafford Needham, 1924–1928. Needham was engaged to Helen Carleton Pollitt, but broke the engagement, upon which he was assaulted by Pollitt's brother, James, with a horsewhip.
- George Peppin Maitland Ware, 1928–1936.
- David Herman Rettick, 1936–1943.
- Wallace James Conran, 1943–1947.
- Arthur Edward Warr, 1947–1949.

== Rectors and Deans ==
- Arthur Edward Warr, 1949–1965.
- Roderick William Bowie, 1966–1968.
- Henry St John Edwards, 1969–1978.
- Bruce Allan Schultz, 1979 – 1983. Schultz was subsequently Bishop of Grafton, 1985–98.
- Richard Warwick Hurford, 1983 – 1997. Hurford was subsequently Bishop of Bathurst, 2000–12.
- Peter Charles Catt, 1997 – 2007. Catt was subsequently Dean of Brisbane.
- Donald Kingsley Kirk, 2008 – 2017. Kirk has been Bishop of Riverina since 2019.
- Gregory Charles Jenks, 2017 – 2022.
- Naomi Cooke, 2023 – .

== See also ==
- List of Anglican churches in New South Wales
- List of Anglican cathedrals in Australia
