= William Stevenson (bishop) =

William Henry Webster Stevenson (9 June 1878 – 15 August 1945) was an Anglican bishop.

== History ==
Stevenson was educated at Sydney Grammar School and the University of Sydney before beginning his ordained ministry as a curate at Castle Hill, New South Wales. Between 1904 and 1906 he was the curate at Christ Church, Rouse Hill. After further curacies at Darlinghurst, Randwick and Wimbledon, he became an incumbent at Windsor, Queensland and Fortitude Valley. He was Warden of St John's College, University of Queensland and then Principal of St Francis’ Theological College, Brisbane. Later he was Archdeacon of Brisbane, then Bishop of Grafton from his 24 August 1938 consecration (at St Andrew's Cathedral, Sydney until his death.
