= Bruce Schultz (bishop) =

Bruce Allan Schultz (24 May 1932 – 27 July 2012) was the eighth Bishop of Grafton in the Anglican Church of Australia.

Schultz was educated at Culcairn High School, St Columb's Hall, Wangaratta and St John's College, Morpeth. He was briefly a sheep farmer before beginning his ordained ministry as a curate at Broken Hill. After this he was priest in charge at Ardlethan and then the Archdeacon of Rockhampton and Dean of Christ Church Cathedral, Grafton. He was consecrated a bishop on 1 March 1983 at St John's Cathedral (Brisbane) and served as an Assistant Bishop of Brisbane until his election to Grafton. He retired effective 14 January 1998.

Schultz died in Buderim Views in 2012; he was married and had children.

Anglican Communion titles
Preceded by Donald Shearman	Bishop of Grafton; 1985 –1998	Succeeded by Philip Huggins
