= Christopher Storrs =

Anglican bishop of Grafton (1889–1977)

Christopher Evelyn Storrs (4 February 1889 - 19 February 1977) was an Anglican bishop in the mid 20th century.

Storrs was born into an ecclesiastical family and educated at Malvern and Pembroke College, Cambridge before beginning his ordained ministry with a curacy at Leeds Parish Church. He was a Chaplain to the Forces from 1916 to 1919 and then of his old school until 1930. From 1930 to 1939 he was at St George's College, Perth, Western Australia, then Archdeacon of Northam. In 1946 he became Bishop of Grafton, a post he held for nine years. After this he was Warden of St John's Theological College, Morpeth, New South Wales until 1959. His final position before retirement was as Rector of Hazelbury Bryan.
