= Murray Harvey =

Australian bishop (born 1963/64)

The Right Reverend Murray Harvey
- Bishop of Grafton
- Church: Anglican Church of Australia
- Diocese: Grafton
- Installed: 29 September 2018
- Predecessor: Sarah Macneil

Orders
- Ordination: 1991 (as deacon); 1992 (as priest)
- Consecration: 29 September 2018 by Glenn Davies

Personal details
- Born: 1963 or 1964 (age 62–63)
- Denomination: Anglican
- Spouse: Leanne
- Children: 2
- Education: University of Queensland; Deakin University

Murray Harvey is an Australian bishop in the Anglican Church of Australia. He has served as the 12th Bishop of Grafton since September 2018.

== Early life and parish ministry ==
Harvey studied psychology at the University of Queensland and worked for some time as a psychologist before entering ministry. He was trained at St Francis Theological College in Brisbane and was ordained deacon in 1991 and priest in 1992.

Harvey spent several years in England where he served in three rural parishes in the Diocese of Lincoln and was the Bishop's Selection Adviser in the discernment process for people offering for the ordained ministry.

Upon his return to Australia he served as the rector of St Mark's, Clayfield, and from 2014 a residentiary canon of St John's Cathedral, Brisbane.

== Episcopal ministry ==
In June 2018, it was announced that Harvey would be appointed the 12th Bishop of Grafton, replacing Sarah Macneil who had retired earlier that year. He was consecrated bishop and installed as Bishop of Grafton on 12 September 2018.

In May 2019, in response to social media comments posted on Instagram by former rugby player Israel Folau, Harvey denounced the comments as "hate speech" and argued that if Folau was able to justify his comments as free speech, ethnic cleaning and slavery would also be permitted using religious justifications. He called on Folau to "achieve more for his faith by rethinking his choice of words, particularly in the public arena".

== Personal life ==
Harvey is married to Leanne and has two children.

Anglican Communion titles
Preceded by Sarah Macneil	Bishop of Grafton; 2018 to present	Incumbent
