= Keith Slater (bishop) =

Australian Anglican bishop (born 1949)

Keith Francis Slater (born 1949) is an Australian former bishop in the Anglican Church of Australia. He was the Bishop of Grafton from 2003 until he resigned in 2013 due to complaints concerning his handling of abuse. He was found to be unfit to remain in holy orders in 2025.

Slater studied at the University of Queensland (Bachelor of Arts), Brisbane College of Theology (Licentiate in Theology; Master of Ministry) and Kelvin Grove Teachers College (Diploma of Teaching).

Slater was a curate in Gladstone, Queensland, priest in charge at Springsure and the archdeacon of Lilley. From 2003 to 2013, he was the Bishop of Grafton. On 17 May 2013 he resigned due to complaints concerning his handling of abuse at the North Coast Children's Home in Lismore, New South Wales.

Slater was deposed from holy orders on 16 October 2015 by the professional standards board of the Diocese of Grafton. However, on 19 January 2017 the appellate tribunal of the Anglican Church of Australia declared that, though it had no appellate jurisdiction in the matter, the deposition itself had had no legal basis because, in purporting to depose him, the diocesan professional standards board had exceeded its own jurisdiction. As a consequence, Slater's deposition from holy orders was overturned. In March 2025, the episcopal standards board of the Anglican Church of Australia found him unfit to remain in holy orders and thereby deposed him from his orders.
