= Anglican Diocese of Grafton =

Diocese of the Anglican Church of Australia

Diocese of Grafton
- Coat of arms

Location
- Country: Australia
- Ecclesiastical province: New South Wales
- Coordinates: 30°S 153°E

Statistics
- Parishes: 22
- Churches: 54
- Schools: 5

Information
- Denomination: Anglicanism
- Established: 1914
- Cathedral: Christ Church Cathedral, Grafton

Current leadership
- Bishop: Murray Harvey

Website
- Diocese of Grafton

The Anglican Diocese of Grafton is one of the 23 dioceses of the Anglican Church of Australia. The diocese is located in north-east New South Wales and covers the area from the Queensland border to Port Macquarie in the south and west to the Great Dividing Range.

Created in 1914 as a result of a division of the previous Diocese of Grafton and Armidale it has 22 parishes and 3 transitional ministry districts and an Anglicare organisation seeking to support community and social needs within the diocese. The cathedral church is the Cathedral Church of Christ the King in Grafton.

The Church of St Thomas at Port Macquarie was built by an early Governor of New South Wales, Thomas Brisbane. It is the fifth oldest church building in Australia.

The current Bishop of Grafton, Murray Harvey, is the 12th bishop of the diocese. He was installed at Christ Church Cathedral, Grafton, on 29 September 2018.

Sarah Macneil the 11th Bishop of Grafton become the first woman to lead an Australian diocese as bishop. Macneil announced her resignation on 17 November 2017, to be effective from 3 March 2018.

The bishop is based in Grafton.

== Bishops ==
Bishops of Grafton
No	From	Until	Incumbent	Notes
1	1914	1921	Cecil Druitt	Previously Coadjutor Bishop of Grafton and Armidale; died in office.
2	1921	1938	John Ashton	
3	1938	1945	William Stevenson	Previously Archdeacon of Brisbane; died in office.
4	1946	1955	Christopher Storrs	Previously Archdeacon of Northam.
5	1956	1961	Kenneth Clements	Previously bishop coadjutor in the Diocese of Goulburn; translated to Canberra and Goulburn.
6	1961	1973	Gordon Arthur	Previously an assistant bishop in the Diocese of Canberra and Goulburn.
7	1973	1985	Donald Shearman	Previously Bishop of Rockhampton; later resigned his holy orders and was defrocked.
8	1985	1998	Bruce Schultz	Previously Dean of Grafton.
9	1998	2003	Philip Huggins	Previously an Assistant Bishop of Perth; later an Assistant Bishop of Melbourne.
10	2003	2013	Keith Slater	Deposed from Holy Orders in 2025.
11	2014	2018	Sarah Macneil	Previously an archdeacon in the Diocese of Canberra and Goulburn and Dean of Adelaide.
12	2018	present	Murray Harvey	Consecrated and installed 29 September 2018.

== Cathedral ==
The cathedral church is Christ Church Cathedral in Grafton which was designed by John Horbury Hunt and commenced in 1884 during the episcopacy of Bishop James Turner and completed to its present stage in 1937. The building is of brick construction in a Gothic Revival style with towering arches and ornate stained glass windows. An organ was installed in 1884 by George Fincham of Melbourne which was replaced in 1992 by a 1903 instrument brought from London by Peter D.G. Jewkes Pty Ltd of Sydney.

The cathedral is a National Trust listed building.

=== Deans of Grafton ===
The following individuals have served as Deans of Grafton:

Ordinal	Name	Term start	Term end	Notes
1	Arthur Edward Warr	1949	1965	
2	Roderick William Bowie	1966	1968	
3	Henry St John Edwards	1969	1978	
4	Bruce Allan Schultz	1979	1983	Afterwards Bishop of Grafton, 1985
5	Richard Warwick Hurford	1983	1997	Later Bishop of Bathurst, 2001
6	Peter Charles Catt	1997	2007	Afterwards Dean of Brisbane, 2008
7	Donald Kingsley Kirk	2007	2017	Later Bishop of Riverina, 2019
8	Gregory Charles Jenks	2017	2022	
9	Naomi Cooke	2023	Current	Installed 12 August 2023

== Church schools ==
The diocese also has a number of church-based schools providing education across a range of age groups.

Founded	School	Enrollment	Years	Location
1981	Lindisfarne Anglican Grammar School	1100	P-12	Tweed Heads
1993	Bishop Druitt College	1192	K-12	Coffs Harbour
1998	Emmanuel Anglican College	388	P-12	Ballina
1998	Clarence Valley Anglican School	297	P-12	Grafton
2002	St Columba Anglican School	680	P-12	Port Macquarie
