= Stuart Robinson (bishop) =

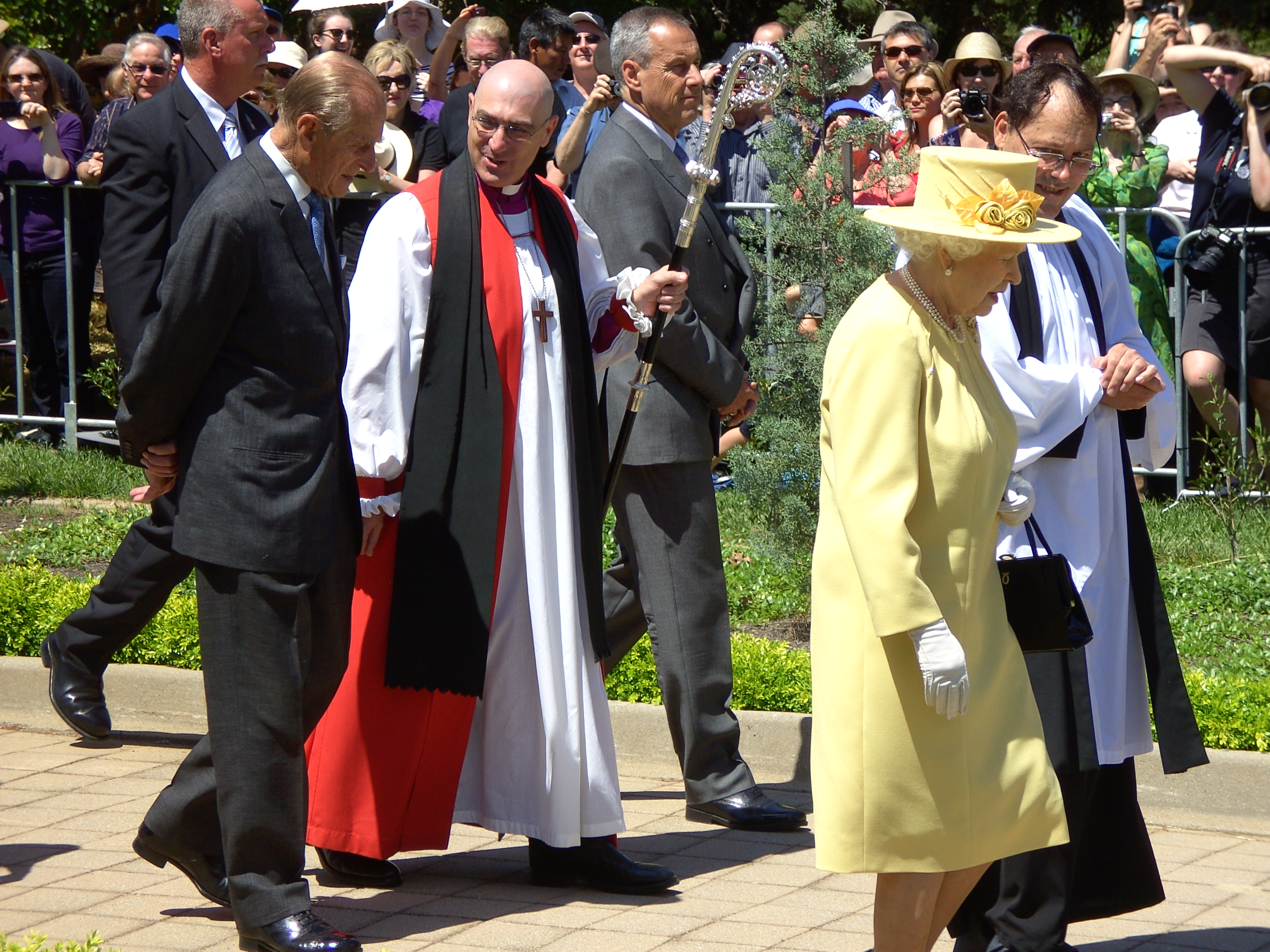
Robinson (in red) talking with the Duke of Edinburgh during a royal visit to Australia in 2011

Stuart Peter Robinson (born 1959) is a bishop in the Anglican Church of Australia. He served as Bishop of Canberra and Goulburn from 2008 to 2018.

Robinson was elected 10th bishop of the diocese on 2 November 2008 and was consecrated and enthroned at St Saviour's Cathedral, Goulburn, on 31 January 2009.

In December 2017, he announced his intention to resign as diocesan bishop at Easter 2018. He was inducted as rector of St Michael's Church in Vaucluse on 5 May 2018 until his retirement on 31 December 2023.
