= Province of New South Wales =

Ecclesiastical province of the Anglican Church of Australia

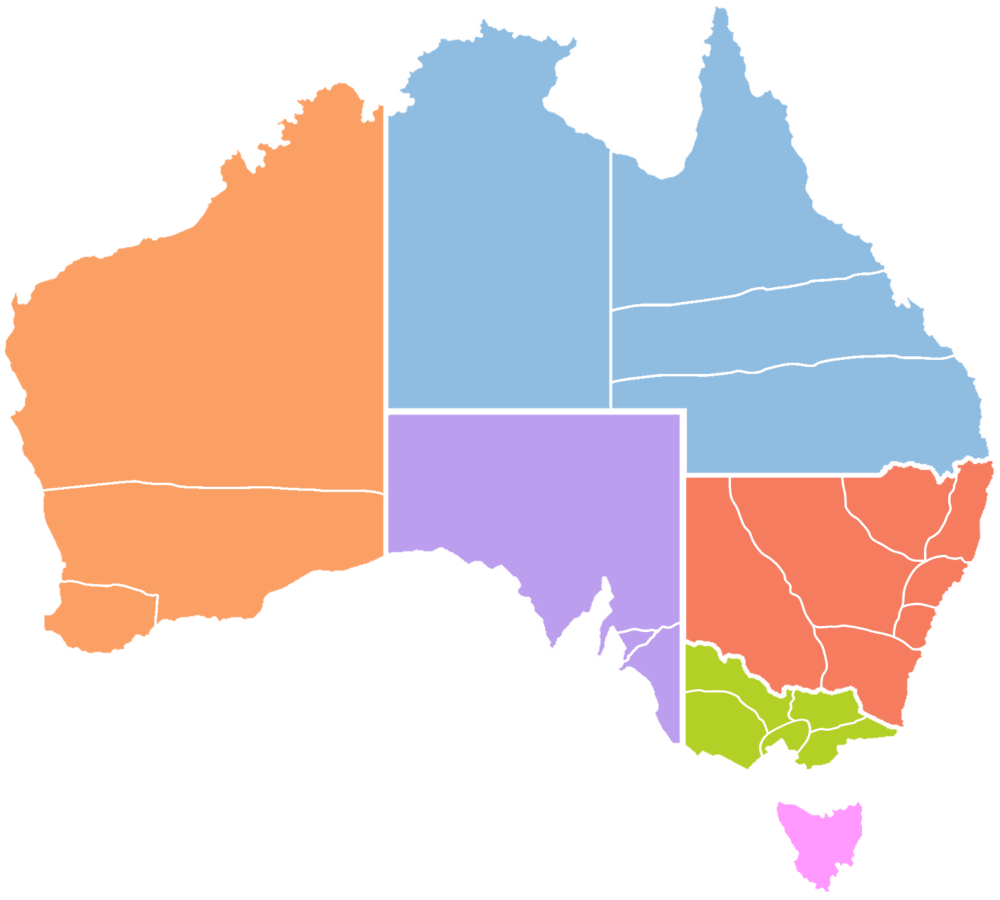
- Location of the Province (depicted in red) in Australia
- Church: Anglican Church of Australia
- Metropolitan bishop: Archbishop of Sydney
- Cathedral: St Andrew's Cathedral, Sydney
- Dioceses: Seven

The Province of New South Wales is an ecclesiastical province of the Anglican Church of Australia, the boundaries of which are nearly all of the state New South Wales and the Australian Capital Territory. The province consists of seven dioceses: Armidale, Bathurst, Canberra and Goulburn, Grafton, Newcastle, Riverina and Sydney.

The metropolitan of the province is the Archbishop of Sydney. Kanishka Raffel was elected as Archbishop of Sydney and Metropolitan of New South Wales on 6 May 2021 and was consecrated and installed in that role on 28 May 2021.
