= Anglican Diocese of Canberra and Goulburn =

Diocese of the Anglican Church of Australia

Diocese of Canberra and Goulburn
- Coat of arms

Location
- Country: Australia
- Ecclesiastical province: New South Wales
- Metropolitan: Archbishop of Sydney
- Coordinates: 34°45′12″S 149°42′57″E

Statistics
- Parishes: 60

Information
- Denomination: Anglican
- Rite: Low church evangelical
- Established: 1863 (as the Diocese of Goulburn); 1950 (as the Diocese of Canberra and Goulburn)
- Cathedral: St Saviour's Cathedral, Goulburn

Current leadership
- Parent church: Anglican Church of Australia
- Bishop: Right Rev Mark Short, DD (since 6 April 2019)
- Assistant bishop: Right Rev Vanessa Bennett (since 2024)

Website
- anglicancg.org.au

The Diocese of Canberra and Goulburn is one of the 23 dioceses of the Anglican Church of Australia. The diocese has 60 parishes covering most of south-east New South Wales, the eastern Riverina and the Australian Capital Territory (ACT). It stretches from Marulan in the north, from Batemans Bay to Eden on the south coast across to Holbrook in the south-west, north to Wagga Wagga, Temora, Young and Goulburn.

== History ==
The Diocese of Goulburn was excised out of the Diocese of Sydney in 1863. At that time, it extended to the south and west of Goulburn to the south-western corner of New South Wales (south of the 34th degree of latitude). In 1884, the diocese was divided, with the western portion designated as the major part of the newly created Diocese of Riverina. In 1950, the name of the remaining part of the diocese was changed to Diocese of Canberra and Goulburn, and in 1986, the area around and including Albury was subsumed into the Diocese of Wangaratta.

St Saviour's Cathedral is located in Goulburn, New South Wales. Both the diocesan bishop and the diocesan office are located in Canberra, Australia's national capital, which is 87 kilometres (54 miles) to the south of Goulburn.

== List of diocesan bishops ==
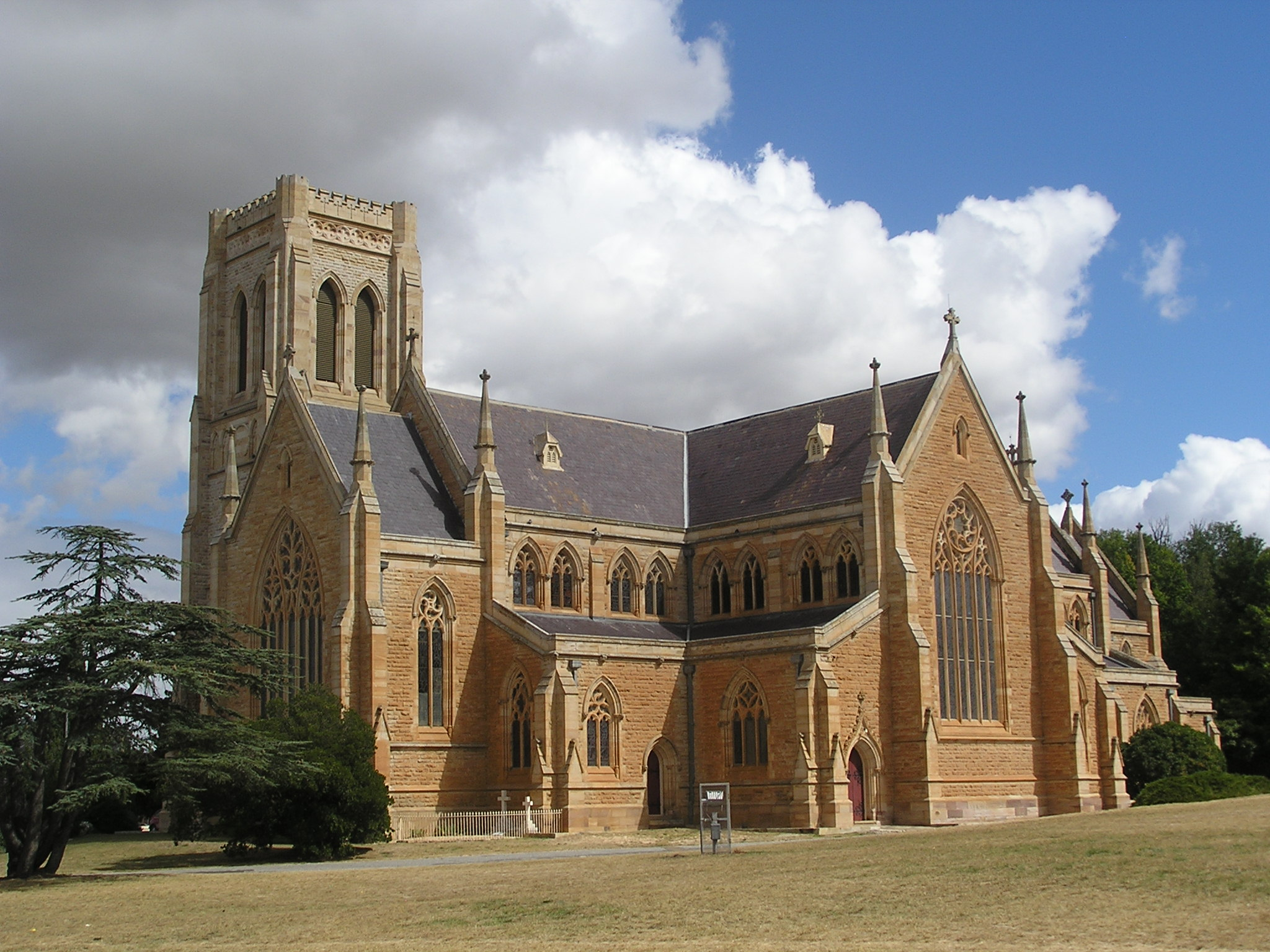
St Saviour's Cathedral, Goulburn

== Bishops ==
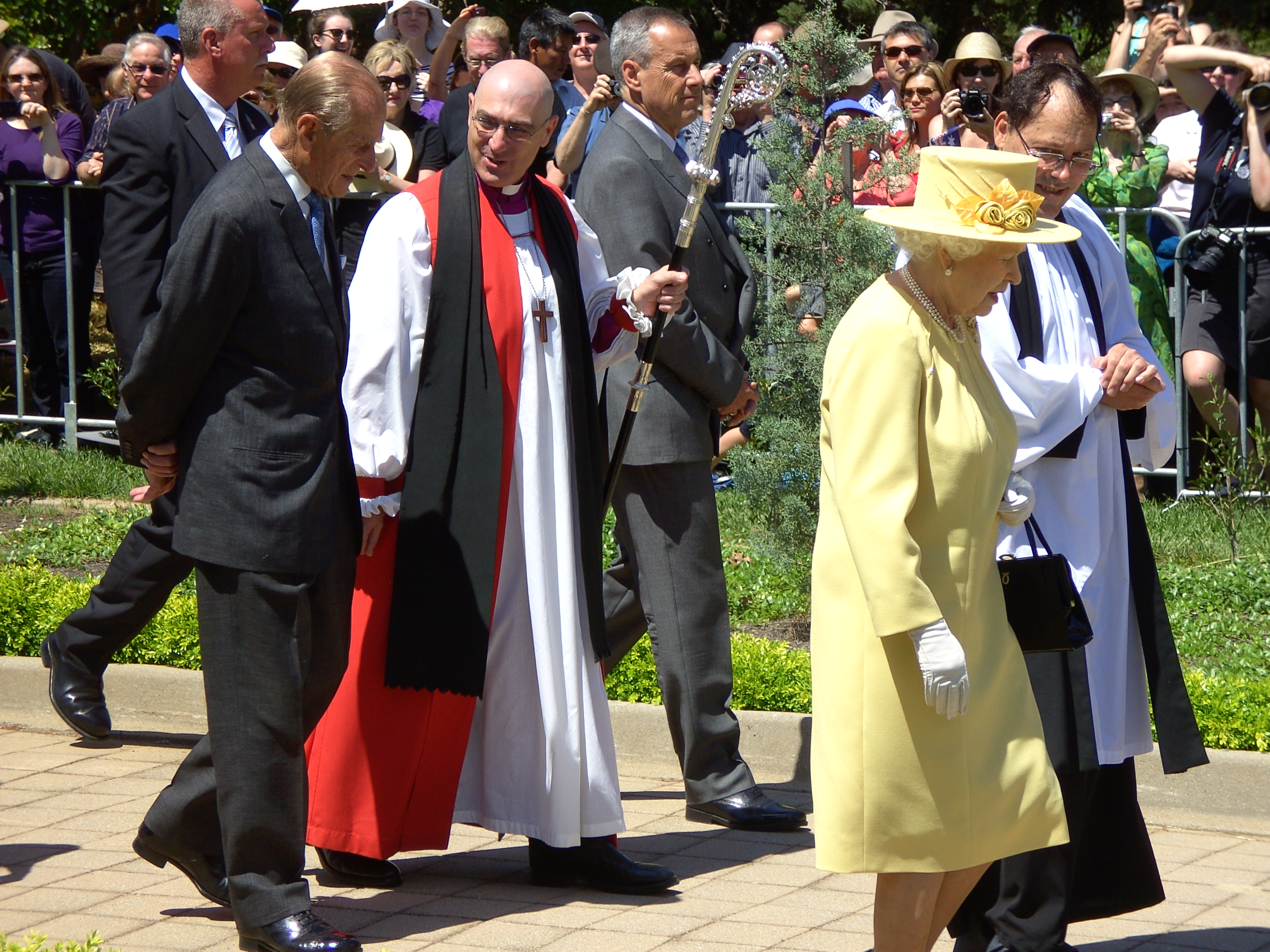
Elizabeth II talking with Paul Black and Prince Philip, Duke of Edinburgh with Stuart Robinson at St John the Baptist Church, Reid on 23 October 2011

Stuart Robinson was elected 10th bishop of the diocese on 2 November 2008 and laid up his staff on 31 March 2018. He was consecrated and enthroned at St Saviour's Cathedral, Goulburn on 31 January 2009. Trevor Edwards (bishop) was consecrated assistant bishop on 12 June 2004.

Bishop Trevor Edwards served the Diocese of Canberra and Goulburn as Episcopal Administrator until the Consecration of the Reverend Mark Short as Diocesan Bishop in St Saviour's Cathedral Goulburn on 6 April 2019.

== Assistant bishops ==
Kenneth John Clements was Archdeacon of Goulburn before his consecration to the episcopate as the first bishop coadjutor in the Diocese of Goulburn on 29 June 1949. He succeeded, becoming diocesan Bishop of Grafton in 1956. Five years later he was translated to (by then renamed) Diocese of Canberra and Goulburn.

Allan Warren was consecrated an assistant bishop within the Diocese of Canberra and Goulburn on 21 September 1965, and on 15 November 1971 was elected its diocesan bishop.

Owen Douglas was the Archdeacon of Canberra when he was consecrated assistant bishop in the Diocese of Canberra and Goulburn on 25 March 1981, and on 15 November 1983 was elected its diocesan bishop.

Richard Randerson served as Assistant Bishop of Canberra & Goulburn from his consecration on 21 December 1994 until 1999, when he became vicar-general of Auckland (and later assistant bishop).

Bruce Wilson was Director of St Mark's Theological College, Canberra and an Assistant Bishop, 1984–1989; at the time of his consecration, he was the church's youngest bishop.

Ian George was an Assistant Bishop, 1989–1991; and Godfrey Fryar, 2003–2013. Trevor Edwards served as assistant bishop from 2004 and Vicar-General from 2009 to 2019.

The consecration of Genieve Blackwell, formerly the Archdeacon for Goulburn and Rural Ministry, as part-time assistant bishop for the region of Wagga Wagga, the North-West and South-West (also becoming the Archdeacon of Wagga Wagga) and Ian Lambert, formerly the Archdeacon for the South Coast and Monaro, as part-time assistant bishop for the region of the Coast, Southern Monaro and the Snowy (also remaining as archdeacon) took place at St Saviour's Cathedral, Goulburn on 31 March 2012. The then Archbishop of Sydney, Peter Jensen, who would normally be expected to consecrate the new bishops, asked the Bishop of Newcastle, Brian Farran, to take his place because Jensen opposes the ordination of women. Blackwell was the third woman to become an Anglican bishop in Australia and the 31st in the world. Subsequently, Bishop Genieve Blackwell served as Bishop of the Marmingatha Episcopate in the Diocese of Melbourne since her appointment in 2015. Bishop Ian Lambert has served as Assistant Bishop to the Australian Defence Force since his appointment in 2013.

Archdeacon Matt Brain was consecrated bishop by Bishop Stuart Robinson on 18 June 2015 and served as Assistant Bishop in the diocese of Canberra and Goulburn until his appointment as Bishop of Bendigo in 2018.

Stephen Pickard served as an assistant bishop from 2012 to 2022.

Carol Wagner served as an assistant bishop from 2020 to 2024. Vanessa Bennett was consecrated assistant bishop on 24 August 2024.

== See also ==
- Anglican hierarchy in Australia
- List of women bishops in the Anglican Church of Australia
