= Anglican Diocese of Bathurst =

Diocese of the Anglican Church of Australia

Diocese of Bathurst
- Coat of arms

Location
- Country: Australia
- Ecclesiastical province: New South Wales
- Metropolitan: Archbishop of Sydney
- Coordinates: 32°S 146°E

Statistics
- Parishes: 32

Information
- Denomination: Anglicanism
- Established: 1870
- Cathedral: All Saints' Cathedral

Current leadership
- Bishop of Bathurst: Vacant
- Dean: James Hodson

Website
- www.bathurstanglican.org.au

The Anglican Diocese of Bathurst is located in the Province of New South Wales. It includes the cities of Orange, Bathurst and Dubbo.

== Ministry ==
The diocese has 28 parishes covering about a third of the state of New South Wales. As well as the cities of Orange, Dubbo and Bathurst, major towns in the diocese include Bourke, Cobar, Cowra, Forbes, Mudgee, Parkes and Wellington.

== Cathedral ==
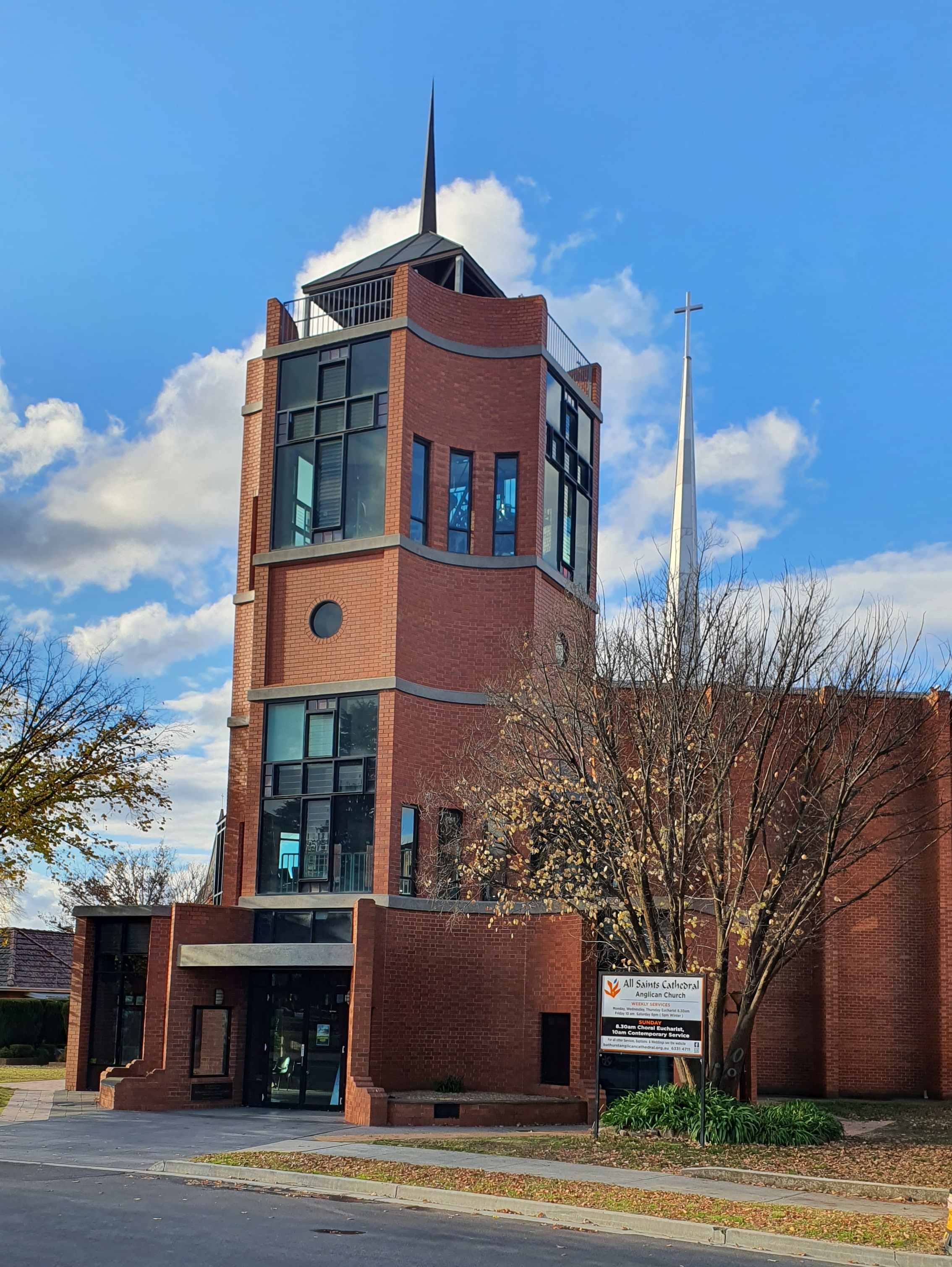
All Saints' Cathedral

The cathedral church of the diocese is All Saints' Cathedral, Bathurst in the heart of the city. The cathedral building was originally designed by Edmund Blacket in 1845 as a parish church, but became a cathedral in 1870 with the creation of the Diocese of Bathurst. An organ was installed in 1886 and bells were hung in 1855. In the 1890s, however, the bell tower was found to be unstable, so the bells could not be "rung full circle" but only by striking them.

Due to structural problems the original cathedral was demolished in 1969–70 and replaced in 1971 by a new building constructed in a 20th-century style. In 2009, the bells were rehung in a new bell tower attached to the new cathedral.

== Senior clergy ==
=== Bishops of Bathurst ===
Bishops of Bathurst
No	From	Until	Incumbent	Notes
1	1869	1885	Samuel Marsden	Returned to England and served as an honorary assistant bishop in Gloucester.
2	1887	1911	Charles Camidge	Enthroned 3 January 1888; died in office.
3	1911	1928	George Long CBE	Consecrated 30 November 1911; translated to Newcastle.
4	1928	1936	Horace Crotty	Previously Dean of Newcastle; returned to England.
5	1937	1958	Arnold Wylde CBE	Coadjutor bishop since 1927; died in office.
6	1959	1981	Ken Leslie OBE	
7	1981	1989	Howell Witt	Translated from North West Australia.
8	1989	2000	Bruce Wilson	previously Director of St Mark's Theological College, Canberra and Assistant Bishop of Canberra and Goulburn
9	2001	2012	Richard Hurford OAM	Previously Dean of Grafton
10	2013	2019	Ian Palmer	Consecrated and installed on 9 February 2013. Previously Archdeacon of South Canberra
11	2019	present	Mark Calder	Consecrated 21 November 2019, installed 23 November 2019.

=== Assistant bishops ===
The following people have served as an assistant bishop in the diocese:

- Arnold Lomas Wylde, consecrated 1 November 1927 (served as bishop coadjutor until his enthronement as Bishop of Bathurst on 23 February 1937)
- Montague D'Arcy Collins, consecrated 11 June 1951 (served as bishop coadjutor until his death on 9 July 1959)
- Peter Thomas Danaher, consecrated 30 July 2005 (served until 15 July 2009)
- John Stead, consecrated 29 August 2009 (translated to Willochra in 2012)

=== Deans of Bathurst ===
The following individuals have served as Deans of the All Saints' Cathedral in Bathurst:

Ordinal	Name	Term start	Term end	Notes
1	John Thomas Marriott	1882	1912	
2	Henry Robert Holmes	1932	unknown	Died 1948
3	Eric Arthur George Barker	1971	?	
4	Richard Franklin Appleby	1979	1982	Afterwards Bishop of Northern Territory, 1992
5	Colin Davies Sheumack	1982	1987	Afterwards Bishop of Gippsland, 1987
6	Ken Hewlett	1988	1993	Later became vicar at St Andrew's Church, Brighton in 1993 upon the retirement of Harlin Butterley and served there until 2003.
7	Michael Birch	1994	2001	
8	Andrew Sempell	2002	2010	
9	Anne Wentzel	2010	2016	
10	James Hodson	2017	present	

== Parishes and Churches ==
Most of the 28 parishes in the Diocese each perform services at multiple locations. Sunday and weekday services are usually conducted weekly or in certain weeks of the month indicated below in parentheses. In addition to church buildings, many parishes conduct services in nursing homes, hospitals or community halls which are included below. Most parishes employ one priest to oversee ministry of the parish who can be assisted by lay staff, assistant clergy or honorary clergy.

Many of the smaller or rural parishes do not keep or frequently update websites, meaning that the services times and staff listed below may be outdated. The best way to find accurate service times in these locations is to contact or visit the parish directly. In 2020, many of these service times were interrupted due to the COVID-19 pandemic, and many parishes, as well as the bishop himself, conducted services online.

Parishes and Churches in the Anglican Diocese of Bathurst with Service Times
Parish	Staff	Church	Services
Bathurst Cathedral	Very Rev James Hodson Ms Kathy Keech	All Saints' Cathedral, Bathurst	Sat 5:00pm, 6:00pm Sun 8:30am, 10:00am, 4:30pm (1st, 3rd) Mon 8:30am Tue 1:00pm Wed 8:30am Fri 10:00am
Bathurst Cathedral	Very Rev James Hodson Ms Kathy Keech	St Stephen's Fitzgerald's Valley	Sun 2:00pm (4th)
Bathurst Cathedral	Very Rev James Hodson Ms Kathy Keech	Holy Spirit, Turondale	Sun 3:00pm (3rd)
Bathurst Cathedral	Very Rev James Hodson Ms Kathy Keech	St Barnabas', South Bathurst	Sun 9:30am
St Paul's, Yetholme	Sun 11:45am (1st, 3rd)		
St Peter's, Rockley	Sun 11:00am, 11:30am (4th), 3:00pm (2nd)		
Blayney	-	Christ Church, Blayney	Sun 8:00am, 9:30am
Blayney	-	St Mark's, Millthorpe	Sun 9:30am
Blayney	-	Holy Spirit, Trunkey Creek	Sun 8:00am (2nd), 9:00am (4th)
Blayney	-	St James', Barry	Sun 9:00am (3rd)
Bourke/Brewarrina	Rev John & Denise Gaff Rev Canon Grahame Yager	Bourke	
Bourke/Brewarrina	Rev John & Denise Gaff Rev Canon Grahame Yager	Brewarrina	Sun 9:00am
Bourke/Brewarrina	Rev John & Denise Gaff Rev Canon Grahame Yager	Weilmoringle Tennis Shed	by arrangement
Bourke/Brewarrina	Rev John & Denise Gaff Rev Canon Grahame Yager	Wanaaring Community Hall	by arrangement (monthly)
Canowindra	Rev Joy Harris	All Saints', Canowindra	Sun 9:00am
Canowindra	Rev Joy Harris	Uniting, Canowindra	Sun 5:00pm (3rd) Thu 10:00am (1st, 2nd)
Canowindra	Rev Joy Harris	St Matthews', Woodstook	Sun 8:00am (1st, 3rd), evening (5th)
Canowindra	Rev Joy Harris	Uniting, Cranbury	Sun 11:00am (1st, 2nd, 3rd, 5th)
Canowindra	Rev Joy Harris	Uniting, Cudal	Sun evening (2nd)
Cobar	Company of the Good Shepherd	St Paul's, Cobar	Sun 9:00am
Condobolin	Company of the Good Shepherd	All Saints', Condobolin	Sun 9:00am Wed 10:30am (4th)
Condobolin	Company of the Good Shepherd	The Ret. Village, Condobolin	Wed 10:30am (1st)
Condobolin	Company of the Good Shepherd	Kiacatoo CWA Hall	by arrangement
Condobolin	Company of the Good Shepherd	Vermont Hill Tennis Club	by arrangement
Coolah/Dunedoo	-	St Andrew's, Coolah	Sun 9:00am
Coolah/Dunedoo	-	All Saints', Dunedoo	Sun 8:30am (1st, 3rd) Sat 6:00pm (before 2nd & 4th Sun)
Coolah/Dunedoo	-	St Chad's, Mendooran	Sun 11:30am (3rd)
Coolah/Dunedoo	-	St Laurence's, Neilrex	Sun 11:30am (4th)
Coolah/Dunedoo	-	Old School, Elong Elong	Sun 11:30am (2nd)
Coolah/Dunedoo	-	St John's, Uarbry	destroyed by fire
Coolah/Dunedoo	-	Coolah Hospital	Wed 10:30am (1st)
Coolah/Dunedoo	-	Kahkama Hospital, Dunedoo	Fri 9:45am (3rd)
Coonabarabran	-	Christ Church, Coonabarabran	Sun 7:30am (not 5th), 9:00am
Coonabarabran	-	St Andrew's, Binnaway	Sun 9:30am (1st, 3rd)
Coonabarabran	-	'Cooinda' Day Care	Fri 9:30am
Coonamble		St Barnabas', Coonamble	Sun 9:00am
Coonamble		Warrumbungles	Sun 3:00pm (4th)
Coonamble		Quambone	Sun 11:30am (3rd)
Coonamble		Marra Creek	Sun 3:00pm (3rd)
Coonamble		Carinda	by arrangement
Cowra	Rev John Croudace	St John's Cowra	Sun 9:00am (not 5th), 10:30am (5th)
Cowra	Rev John Croudace	Holy Trinity, Darby's Falls	Sun 11:00am (1st, 3rd)
Cowra	Rev John Croudace	St Peter's, Morongla	Sun 11:00am (2nd, 4th)
Cowra	Rev John Croudace	Weeronga Nursing Home	Wed 11:00am (3rd)
Cowra	Rev John Croudace	Bilyara Retirement Village	Mon 2:00pm (4th)
Cudal		St James', Cudal	Sun 8:45am (1st, 3rd)
Cudal		St Luke's, Manildra	Sun 10:30am (1st, 3rd, 4th)
Cudal		St Alban's, Toogong	Sun 8:30am (4th, not Jun-Aug)
Cumnock		St Matthew's, Cumnock	Sun 9:30am
Cumnock		All Saints', Baldry	Sun 8:00am (1st, 3rd)
Cumnock		Yeoval UPA Aged Care	Sun 1:30pm (2nd)
Dubbo	Rev Canon Brett Waterson	Holy Trinity, Dubbo	Sun 8:00am, 10:00am Wed 10:00am Fri 10:00am
Dubbo	Rev Canon Brett Waterson	Coboco Community Hall	Sun 5:00pm (2nd, 4th)
Eugowra	Rev Joy Harris	St Matthew's, Eugowra	c/- Canowindra
Forbes		St John's, Forbes	Sun 7:30am, 9:30am Fri 10:00am
Forbes		Bedgerebong	Sun 11:00am (4th)
Forbes		Jemalong Residential Village	Tue 10:30am (2nd, 4th)
Forbes		Northside Chapel	Sun 12:30pm (2nd)
Gilgandra	Rev Canon Grahame Yager	St Ambrose', Gilgandra	Sun 9:00am Fri 10:00am
Gilgandra	Rev Canon Grahame Yager	St Mary Magdalene, Tooraweenah	Sun 11:30 (1st)
Gilgandra	Rev Canon Grahame Yager	CWA Hall, Collie	Sun 11:30 (4th)
Grenfell	Rev Ross Craven	Holy Trinity, Grenfell	Sun 7:30am, 9:30am
Grenfell	Rev Ross Craven	St Margaret's, Glenelg	Sun 11:30am (4th)
Grenfell	Rev Ross Craven	St Paul's, Warraderry	special services
Gulgong		St Luke's, Gulgong	Sun 9:00am
Gulgong		Wenonah Lodge	Tue 10:30am (2nd)
Kelso	Rev Tim Fogo	Holy Trinity, Kelso	Sun 9:00am, 3:00pm Wed 10:00am
Kelso	Rev Tim Fogo	St John the Evangelist, Peel	Sun 11:30am (1st, even months)
Kelso	Rev Tim Fogo	St James', Raglan	Sun 11:30am (1st, odd months)
Kelso	Rev Tim Fogo	Ilumba Gardens Ret. Village	Wed 11:00am (1st)
Kelso	Rev Tim Fogo	Bathurst Nursing Home	Wed 10:00am (3rd)
Kelso	Rev Tim Fogo	Bathurst Gardens Ret. Village	Thu 10:00am (4th)
Molong		St John's Molong	Sun 9:30am
Molong		Holy Trinity, Beri	special services
Molong		Molong Hospital	Fri 11:00am (2nd, 4th)
Molong		Prunus Lodge Nursing Home	Fri 9:30am (2nd, 4th)
Mudgee	Rev Canon Jono Williams	St John the Baptist, Mudgee	Sun 8:30am, 5:30pm Wed 10:00am, 5:30pm Fri 5:30pm
Mudgee	Rev Canon Jono Williams	St Andrew's, Cooyal	Sun 10:00am (1st)
Mudgee	Rev Canon Jono Williams	Holy Redeemer, Windeyer	Sun 10:00am (4th)
Mudgee	Rev Canon Jono Williams	Pioneer House	Fri (1st)
Mudgee	Rev Canon Jono Williams	Mudgee Nursing Home	Fri (3rd)
Mudgee	Rev Canon Jono Williams	Kanandah	Fri (4th)
Narromine		St Mary's, Narromine	Sun 9:00am, 5:00pm Tue 10:00am
Narromine		St Andrew's Uniting, Trangie	Sun 11:00am (2nd, 4th)
Narromine		St John's Primary, Trangie	Thu 6:00pm
Nyngan		St Mark's, Nyngan	Sun 9:00am Thu 1:00am (1st)
Nyngan		St Faith's Hermidale	Sun 11:00am (1st)
Nyngan		"Mudall" Homestead	Fri 7:30pm (3rd)
Nyngan		St Matthew's West Bogan	Sun (4th of quarter)
Oberon		St Barnabas', Oberon	Sun 9:00am
Oberon		St Stephen's, Tarana	Sun 11:30am (3rd)
Oberon		St Peter's, Mutton Falls	Sun 11:30am (5th)
Orange	Rev Andy Martin	Holy Trinity, Orange	Sun 8:30am, 10:30am Wed 10:30am
Orange East	Rev Bob Cameron	St Barnabas', Orange East	Sun 7:30am, 9:30am Thurs 10:30am
Orange East	Rev Bob Cameron	St Philip's, March	Sun 11:30am (1st)
Parkes		St George's, Parkes	Sun 7:30am, 9:30am Wed 10:00am Sat 6:00pm
Parkes		St Stephen's, Peak Hill	Sun 9:00am
Parkes		Bindogundra	Sun 11:15am (1st)
Parkes		Reedy Creek	Sun 11:30am (3rd)
Rylstone/Kandos	vacant	St James', Rylstone	Sun 9:00am (2nd, 4th)
Rylstone/Kandos	vacant	St Laurence', Kandos	Sun 9:00am (1st, 3rd)
Rylstone/Kandos	vacant	Rylstone Hospital	Wed 11:00am (fortnightly)
Rylstone/Kandos	vacant	ADA Cottage, Kandos	Wed 11:00am (fortnightly)
Trundle	Rev Brian Schmalkuche	St Augustine's, Trundle	Sun 10:30am (1st, 2nd, 3rd)
Trundle	Rev Brian Schmalkuche	St Luke's Bogan Gate	Sun 8:30am (1st)
Trundle	Rev Brian Schmalkuche	St John's, Tullamore	Sun 8:30am (2nd)
Trundle	Rev Brian Schmalkuche	All Saints', Albert	Sun 1:00pm (3rd)
Warren		St John the Baptist, Warren	Sun 9:00am
Warren		St Mark's, Tottenham	Sun 9:00am Tue 10:00am
Wellington		St John the Baptist, Wellington	Sun 8:00am, 9:30am Fri 11:00am Sat 6:00pm
Wellington		Stuart Town	Sun 5:00/3:00pm (1st, summer/winter)
Wellington		Curra Creek	Sun 2:30pm (3rd)
Wellington		Bellhaven Nursing Home	Thu 11:00am (1st)
West Wyalong		St Barnabas', West Wyalong	Sun 9:30am Tue 10:00am
West Wyalong		Waratah Village	Tue 10:30am (4th)

== See also ==
- Anglican Bishop of Bathurst
