= Riseborough =

Riseborough is an English surname and placename.

== People ==
- Andrea Riseborough

== Places ==
- Riseborough, an area of Pickering, North Yorkshire
- Thornton Riseborough, a township in the parish of Normanby in North Yorkshire
- Riseborough Hall, a mansion in the parish of Normanby in North Yorkshire

== See also ==
- Risborough (disambiguation)
