= Holy Trinity Anglican Church, Kelso =

Heritage listed Church in New South Wales, Australia

Holy Trinity Anglican Church
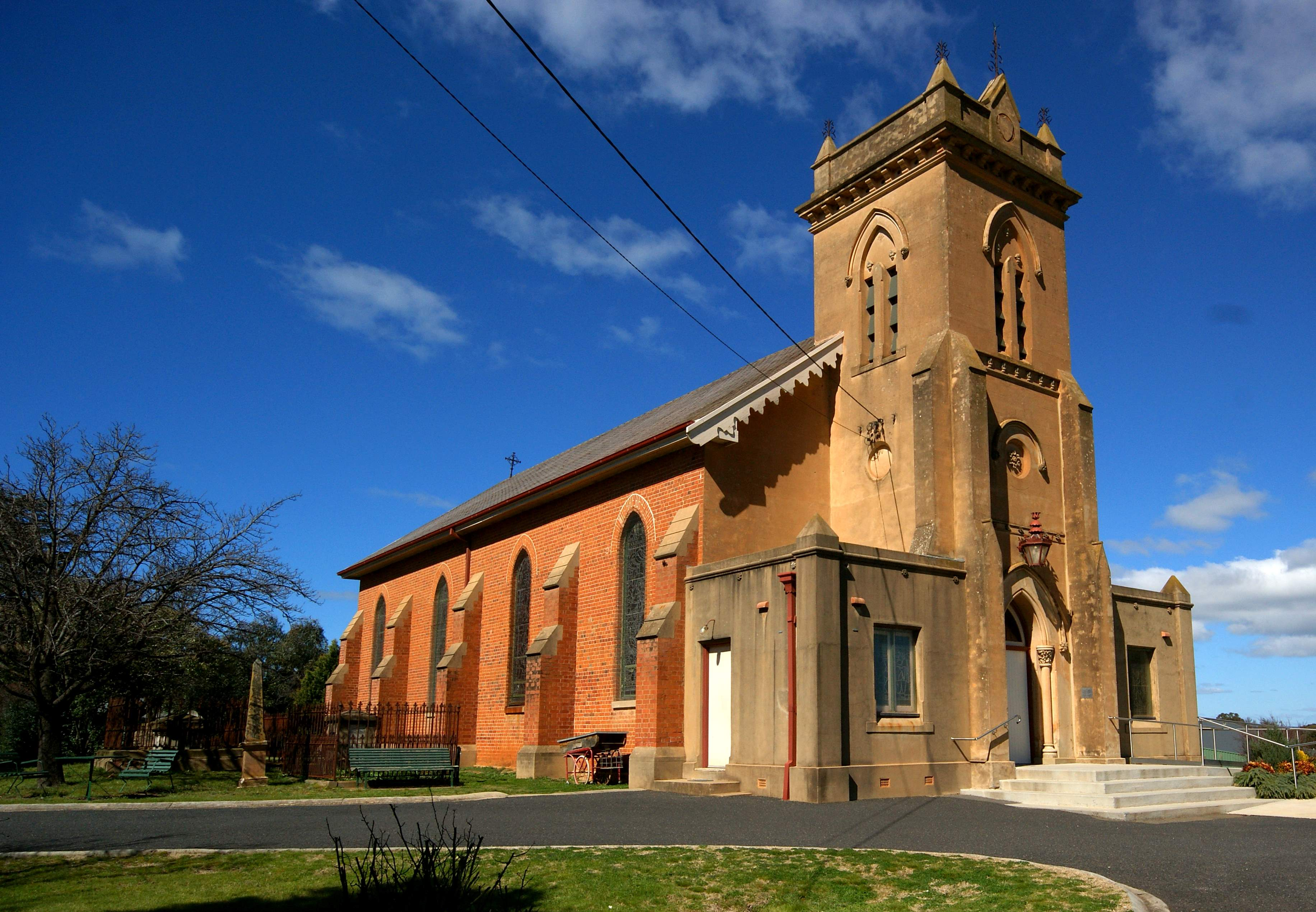
- Holy Trinity Anglican Church, pictured in 2010

- Location in New South Wales
- 33°24′44″S 149°36′10″E
- Location: 71-85 Gilmour Street, Kelso, Bathurst Region, New South Wales
- Country: Australia
- Denomination: Anglican
- Website: windsoranglican.asn.au/home

History
- Status: Church
- Founded: 1 February 1834
- Founder: Arch-Deacon William Broughton
- Dedication: Holy Trinity
- Dedicated: 3 December 1836 by Bishop William Broughton
- Consecrated: 1835 by Rev. Samuel Marsden

Architecture
- Functional status: Active
- Architects: Edmund Blacket (rectory); Unknown (church)
- Architectural type: Church
- Style: Victorian Ecclesiastical Gothic
- Years built: 1833–1878

Administration
- Diocese: Bathurst
- Parish: Kelso

New South Wales Heritage Register
- Official name: Holy Trinity Anglican Church Group; Anglican Church
- Type: State heritage (complex / group)
- Designated: 14 January 2011
- Reference no.: 1852
- Type: Church
- Category: Religion
- Builders: John Foster (original church)

Holy Trinity Anglican Church is a heritage-listed Anglican church precinct, containing the church, rectory and adjacent cemetery, at 71-85 Gilmour Street, Kelso, Bathurst Region, New South Wales, Australia. The church was built from 1833 to 1878, with John Foster being responsible for the building of the original church. Edmund Blacket designed the rectory. The property is owned by Anglican Property Trust Diocese of Bathurst and Parish of Kelso, Anglican Diocese of Bathurst. It was added to the New South Wales State Heritage Register on 14 January 2011.

== History ==
Dating from 1835, Holy Trinity Church Kelso was the first church consecrated west of the Blue Mountains. With its pioneer cemetery and rectory designed by Edmund Blacket, it is one of the most significant building groups in the Central West region. Holy Trinity played a vital part in the regional growth of the Anglican Church, enjoying the early support of well known religious figures at the time such as Rev. Samuel Marsden and Bishop William Broughton. Although the buildings are not physically located central to village life, Holy Trinity and its parishioners have played an important supporting role in the spiritual growth of the region. The buildings remain in their original use and are much loved and appreciated by the community.

=== Wiradjuri land ===
The Bathurst Plains are part of the ancestral homelands of the Wiradjuri people. Their lands were nestled between three rivers; Wambool (Macquarie), Kalare (Lachlan) and Murrumbidgeri (Murrumbigee). These rivers provided a good source of fish, duck, kangaroo, emu and various edible plants. The Wiradjuri had a typical Aboriginal social system based on kinship and totemic lore. The Wiradjuri people resisted European expansion into their territory as it was ruining traditional hunting grounds and desecrating sacred places. Settlement following Governor Macquarie's first visit to Bathurst in 1815 saw increasing conflict in the region, particularly under the leadership of Windradyne (c. 1790-c. 1835) and martial law was declared in the Bathurst area for a short time in 1824. The eventual surrender of Windradyne signalled a reduction in hostilities, although the decline in traditional indigenous ways of life continued.

=== Crossing the Blue Mountains ===
The settlement of Kelso was a direct result of Governor Lachlan Macquarie's opening of a route for colonial settlement in New South Wales west of the Blue Mountains. In 1813 George William Evans extended beyond Gregory Blaxland, William Charles Wentworth and William Lawson's route over the Blue Mountains into the Bathurst Plains, as they became known, and reported that his exploration found good country. This encouraged Governor Macquarie to arrange for William Cox to take a team of convicts and build a road through the mountains. The road was completed in January 1815, terminating on the left bank of the Macquarie River. On this site on 7 May 1815 Governor Macquarie proclaimed the site of the future town of Bathurst, named after Lord Bathurst, Secretary of State for War and Colonies. Then everyone went to the Governor's tent for a church service, the first to be held west of the Blue Mountains. However, Macquarie had ordered that no major buildings were to be erected on the (left) Bathurst side of the river until the land was properly surveyed. An alternative to Cox's route to Bathurst was soon available, possibly by the middle of 1815. Being shorter and more direct it quickly established itself as the main route to Sydney from Bathurst. This road approached the Bathurst locality from the right bank – in the area that would develop into the village of Kelso. In 1816 Macquarie granted 50 acres of land each to ten prospective settlers on the right bank. These Kelso settlers pioneered civil community life in Bathurst.

=== Kelso's beginnings ===
In the muster of 1821 the Bathurst district population was 287 of which 210 were convicts. In 1822 Rev Samuel Marsden wrote to the new Governor Brisbane requesting that grounds be reserved for an Anglican Glebe, school and cemetery. By the mid-1820s the first entries in the Trinity Church registers were made for burials, baptisms and marriages. In 1826 the restrictions to building on the left bank were lifted and the plans for township of Bathurst were drafted. Also a general resurvey of NSW had been ordered in the early 1820s, resulting in a system of counties, townships and civil parishes. The title deed for the James Blackman grant dated 1823, on which the Holy Trinity group would later be built, notes that the land is within the County of Roxburgh and Township of Kelso. This may be the earliest known date mentioning the name of Kelso. Governor Brisbane took over from Macquarie in December 1821 and his wife, Lady Anna Brisbane was born in Roxburgh County, Scotland, near the town Kelso. It is assumed that use of the names Roxburgh and Kelso in NSW was a compliment to her and her home. The Macquarie River posed a major obstacle for many years and divided Kelso from Bathurst. The river was wider and deeper than it is today and suggestions were put forward by the 1820s for a bridge, however in the 1830s the local population were still relying a flat bottomed boat to cross the river.

=== Growth of Kelso ===
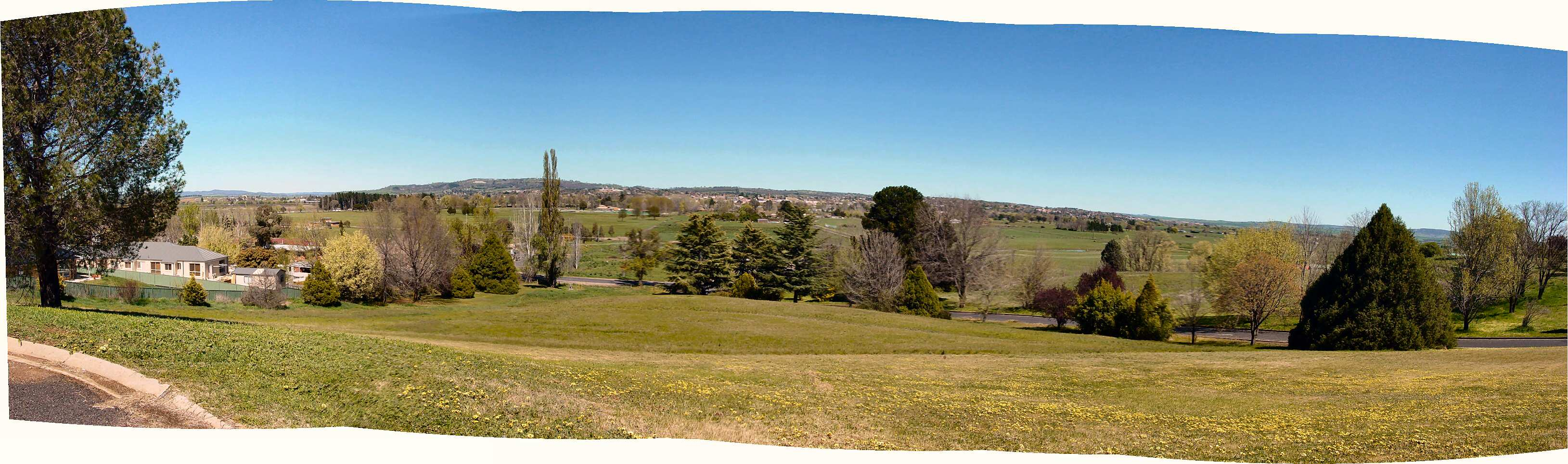
Panorama view from the Holy Trinity Church in Kelso looking over the riverplain where the first farms in the area were settled. In the background is the centre of Bathurst on the other side of the Macquarie River.

The survey of the township of Bathurst and subsequent land sales in 1833 led to slow growth of the town and surrounding areas including Kelso. The first bridge across the Macquarie River, finally linking left and right bank settlements, was built of timber in 1855 but was washed away in floods in 1867. It was not rebuilt until 1870, and then in iron and located upstream and away from Church Lane. This led to the gradual bi-passing of the early urban area of Kelso. A new Church of England Parish of Bathurst was established in 1840 and the original parish became the Parish of Kelso. By the mid nineteenth century Kelso's centre had shifted to the crossroads that had developed on the Sydney Road and it was there that the general stores, butchers, coach makers, blacksmiths and other commercial enterprises established their businesses to service the needs of the neighbourhood and travellers. The discovery of gold in the early 1850s had the resultant increase in travellers and supply needs for the region buoyed the local economy and its businesses as elsewhere in the Central West.

The Raglan-Kelso section of the railway was completed in 1875 and Kelso for a period was the important railhead. However the main workshops and engineering yards were located in Bathurst when that section was completed in 1876, despite much lobbying from Kelso councillors. From 1870 to 1910, the effect of the railways making lands further west more accessible eroded the primacy of the Bathurst region. During the early twentieth century Kelso retained much of its village character while maintaining economic growth through its role as a junction on the Sydney Road. Its importance was reinforced in 1908 with the creation of Turon Shire with its Council offices centred in Kelso. The Great Western Highway brought economic development to the village and many businesses catered for the passing trade with garages, workshops and early petrol stations. The river and its unpredictable course gave Kelso a strategic advantage over Bathurst in terms of access and communications during times of flooding.

Abercrombie Shire and Turon Shire amalgamated in 1976 to form Evans Shire Council which retained its head office in Lee Street Kelso. However, when Evans was amalgamated into Bathurst Regional Council in 2004, the shire offices in Kelso were finally closed in favour of the larger offices in Bathurst. Nonetheless, the Sydney Road with its strip development has remained a vibrant area of economic activity in Kelso. Recent years also have seen a dramatic increase in residential land subdivision and creation of new housing estates east of Gilmour Street and to the north of Holy Trinity Church. The growth of Bathurst and resultant increase in land prices has made Kelso a more attractive investment for lower cost residential or retirement villages. The river flats to the west of the Church have not developed due to their flood prone nature and the Church has retained views of the city of Bathurst that have changed little over the years.

The publication "Village of Kelso", researched and written by Carol Churches and Alan McRae, contains useful material on Kelso village life and its growth, including details on commercial establishments and their owners in Kelso.

=== Holy Trinity ===
Archdeacon Thomas Hobbes Scott came to Australia in 1825 as the Archdeacon of New South Wales. He was based in Sydney and his archdeaconry included much of continental Australia, Van Diemen's Land and New Zealand. In New South Wales he had eleven chaplains to care for the religious needs of the community of 35,000, of which the greater part comprised people with a criminal background. In May 1825 twelve new parishes were approved. Eleven of these parishes were planned for the Cumberland Plain and [in addition] "a moderate church at Bathurst" was approved.' Reverend John Espy Keane was appointed to the ecclesiastic parish of Bathurst and he gave the first of many services in Kelso on 22 January 1826 in settler George Cheshire's barn, which also ended up being used as a school during the week. For some time this parish was the only denomination in the region with a resident priest. Other denominations depended upon the visits of itinerant ministers who came to the region from time to time.

Also in the mid-1820s an area of 17 hectares (42 acres) was purchased from original grantee James Blackman for the Church of England Glebe, on the right bank of the Macquarie River. Predominantly open paddocks, it is thought that Blackman had established a small working farm and the church inherited its improvements. By the 1830s the property included a parsonage, barn, stables and other functional outbuildings. The property is likely to have included some livestock including some sheep, cattle and horses. Holy Trinity Church would be built on Portion 82A at the north-western edge of the Glebe with a cemetery adjacent.

In 1832 the new Governor Bourke agreed to fund half the cost of building an Anglican church for the Bathurst parish, with Kelso being the favoured location because it already had land, parsonage and cemetery. After local fundraising efforts to raise the other half of the cost, a contract to build the church was signed on 26 August 1833 by Mr TF Hawkins, Chair of the Church Committee and Mr John Foster, builder. The Reverend Broughton travelled to Bathurst for the laying of the foundation stone, which took place on 1 February 1834. The final cost of the church was A£1,128 and it was completed a week ahead of schedule on 19 April 1835. The Senior Chaplain Rev. Samuel Marsden dedicated the church on Easter Day 1835. The Sydney Morning Herald reported that every family within 20 miles was represented at the service. Finally, newly consecrated as Bishop of Australia, Bishop Broughton came to Kelso to consecrate Holy Trinity Church on 3 December 1836. Broughton was the only one to hold the title of Bishop of Australia before it was split into various smaller bishoprics.

The significance of Holy Trinity to the settlement is suggested by its marking as "church" in Thomas Mitchell's defining survey of Nineteen Counties in New South Wales, drafted around 1830 and published in London in 1834. At the time of the survey the church was yet to be built, but the government apparently attached symbolism to its presence in the newly opened districts of New South Wales. More than simply suggesting the presence of a building, it implies that a society or community is being established here.

=== The Kelso Church buildings and elements ===
At the dedication in Easter 1835, The Sydney Morning Herald described the church as extremely plain but neat, substantial and commodious. Charles Darwin, visiting Bathurst soon after the church was finished, noted, "There is a hideous little red brick Church standing by itself on a hill". When the church was nine years old, a Sydney reporter covering events in Bathurst wrote, "the adjoining town of Kelso possesses a very neat church". Outside there were no buttresses and the tower only reached the ridge of the roof. . . The roof was of wooden shingles. Inside there were pilasters against the walls that gave the appearance of supporting the flat ceiling. There were four windows in the side walls, as now, however all were paned with plain glass. There were two small windows in the east wall and two small windows on either side of the tower. All the furniture was made of cedar. The box pews had a door at the aisle and parishioners rented a pew, although those not able to meet the rent were allocated a pew at the back. The renting of pews continued until 1921.

The church purchased nearly 73 hectares (180 acres) in 1828. It continued to own nearly 20 hectares (49 acres) for more than 80 years, reduced to seven hectares (seventeen acres) in 1929. In 1997 the old parish hall and land were sold, leaving around six hectares (fifteen acres) in church ownership. In conjunction with the centenary of the parish in 1925 a set of memorial gates were erected at the entrance. After World War II the gravel roads from the street were widened, sealed, curbed and car park built. Dedicated in 1966 the project was named War Memorial Drive to commemorate men and women from the parish who served during World War II.

There have been many alterations and additions to the church since it was first completed. The first major alteration was the replacement of roofing shingles with galvanised iron tiles. In 1875 the height of the tower was increased to conform with the original builder's intentions. This may have been inspired by the offer of a bell in 1874, the first recorded memorial gift, given by Mrs Marian Faviel in memory of her husband Mark. In 1881 the church was able to dispense with candles and oil lamps when gas lighting was installed. In 1889 major works included: raising of the chancel and sanctuary floors and laying of encaustic tiles there; the communion rail was installed; the original box pews were replaced with the present oak pews; the flat chancel ceiling was replaced with the raised, carved lining to the roof; the stained glass windows in the east wall were removed and installed in two of the windows in the side wall; the empty window openings were bricked in and the large, three light window was built into the centre of the east wall; the pilasters were removed and a new stone pulpit, made in England, installed; on the exterior, the walls were buttressed. Edmund Blacket, who was designing the rectory in the mid-1870s, may have been the one who proposed removing the ceiling of the church to expose the timber roof, described as a "visionary" architectural improvement.

In the 1890s further works saw the organ being moved from the gallery and installed in the chancel while acetylene lights replaced gas fittings. Edward Burne-Jones, one of the leading stained glass artists of the late nineteenth century designed the stained glass window which was installed in the east wall using glass manufactured in London. Across the rear of the nave the decorative screen created a baptistery and vestry. By 1910 the rood screen had been erected and the present altar installed and enhanced with a reredos. Some years later the reredos was augmented with panelling across the east wall and the remaining two windows in the side walls filled with stained glass, a memorial to the men from the parish who'd given their lives in World War I. Electricity was connected in 1928. The vestries are more recent additions. Just before World War II the present roof of asbestos cement tiles was installed. During that war all the stained glass windows were removed for safekeeping.

The clergyman originally depended upon parishioners who could sing and lead the psalmody until a barrel organ with just twelve tunes was installed in Holy Trinity in 1841. This was the first musical instrument of any size to cross the Blue Mountains. In 1863 the barrel organ was converted into a keyboard instrument, allowing for other hymns to be played upon it. In the mid-1880s a new organ was installed, built by A. Hunter & Sons of London. One of just ten Hunter organs built for churches in NSW, it is notable in that it remains largely unaltered. Another organ built in 1890 by Telford and Telford of Dublin existed in the Sunday School until 1935 when it was moved to St. Albans, Epping. Now greatly enlarged, this Telford organ serves St. Mark's, Granville.

Holy Trinity features a burial ground backing on to the church. Indeed, the first burials took place nine years before the church was built. The earliest section of the cemetery is known as the Pioneer Cemetery. The Rose Garden there was planted in 1939 and became used for cremations in 1960. In 2008 Carol Churches published "Pioneer Cemetery", a register of 95 identifiable graves and vaults containing the remains of 240 early settlers.

Kelso Parish registers were commenced in 1826. From 1856 the Government of New South Wales made the recording of such information a legal requirement and the responsibility of civil authorities. In 1960 the registers were microfilmed by the Mitchell Library and more recently all entries have been transcribed and digitalised.

In 1827 the original parsonage for Holy Trinity was an extension of the house built for the original grantee James Blackman. By the 1870s it had become run-down and the Reverend Blacket requested his uncle, the renowned colonial architect Edmund Blacket, to prepare a design for a new parsonage. It was completed in 1878. Morton Herman describes the Kelso rectory as 'a fine example of Blacket's more modest domestic work'. Joan Kerr gives the dates c. 1874 for the parsonage and also lists an original drawing held in Mitchell Library. The rectory has also had many improvements in keeping with changing times. While the building now has a modern bathroom the early residents used a circular iron bath in a weatherboard shed attached to the side of the house. Whereas heating was originally provided from fireplaces in all main rooms, now gas fired heating is provided. The gig house in the stables became a garage for the parish car.

In the 1990s a new parish centre was planned, completed in 2001, and located to north of the rectory. Around 2009 a new disabled access ramp was added to the church entrance.

Archdeacon Oakes, rector of Kelso for thirty years once remarked, "nearly every year I find it necessary to go away to escape the severe winter, but wherever I go, I never see anything quite so charming as the little church on the hill at Kelso. . . There is an atmosphere about Kelso which is not often found with Australian churches. It is redolent with sacred associations and one could not wish for more pleasant surroundings.". In 1973 Archdeacon Ellis wrote, 'Its history, setting, the many memorials, have together made Holy Trinity as beautiful a church as one would find. It remains what it was built to be – a House for the worship of God. Here, week-by-week the faithful gather.'

=== Visitors ===
The church has welcomed many visitors during the years, including two colonial governors (Bourke and FitzRoy) and many Bishops. The sesqui-centenary of the church in 1985 was commemorated when the Bishop of Calcutta, Dinesh Chandra Gorai, preached and dedicated a memorial tablet. His presence was a reminder that when the church was built it was part of the Diocese of Calcutta. In 1959 Governor-General William Slim visited the church as did the Archbishop of Canterbury Michael Ramsey in 1965.

== Description ==
The Holy Trinity Church Group at Kelso consists of the church (c. 1835), cemetery and rectory (c. 1878). The group as a whole is picturesquely sited and forms an excellent ecclesiastical group.

The condition of the precinct as a whole was reported as generally good as at 27 September 2006. The church has kept a well-recorded history of the building and its fabric.

=== Holy Trinity Church ===
Holy Trinity Church is located close to the southern edge of the church lands. The original designer is not known although a letter from the builder TF Hawkins to the Colonial Secretary dated 1833 includes sketch drawings for the church building. The original building when completed in 1835 was a simple form with a truncated, square tower. The building has been refined and altered internally and externally over the years by a number of architects.

The building sits picturesquely on the brow of a hill overlooking the river flats and has striking views to and from Bathurst. It is orientated east west with its entrance at the western end now centred below the tower. It is likely to have been one of the first few brick buildings in the Bathurst region. The foundations are local rubble slate stone and the bricks are sandstock and laid in a traditional English Bond. The slate stone acts as a damp proof course protecting the softer bricks above. The main elevations north and south have four high arched windows each with memorial stained glass. The eastern end originally had two similarly proportioned windows but these were replaced in the late 19th century with a large triple window now also with memorial stained glass.

The stained glass windows are skilfully designed and colourfully crafted and appear to be in good condition and well protected externally. The eastern stained glass installed around 1902 was designed and manufactured in England by the renowned English pre-Raphaelite artist Edward Coley Burne-Jones. An overview of stained glass windows in Australia has furthermore noted that: "Holy Trinity at Kelso is prized for its windows by Ashwin and Falconer".

The external walls have stepped brick buttresses which were added in the 1890s at the time of major alterations opening up the roof structure internally. The western wall and the bell tower were rendered. The roof is gabled with a steep pitch and is now sheeted with asbestos cement shingles installed in the 1930s manufactured by James Hardie at the turn of the 20th century to imitate the more expensive Welsh slates. It replaced an early galvanised iron roofing tile similar to that manufactured by Moorewood & Rogers in London and first exported to Australia in the 1840s. Originally the roof was timber shingled. Gutters are galvanised iron quad profiles. Barge boards are also timber and at the eastern end is highly carved with decorative patterns.

The tower is square and originally had a small spire in the centre. This was removed and the tower was extended in the mid nineteenth century with parapet introduced and a pinnacle at each corner with a wrought iron finial in a simple Victorian Ecclesiastical Gothic style. Buttresses were added together with other decoration including projecting cornices, dentil courses, mouldings and attached rendered motifs. The attached vestries are designed in a similar manner and reinforce the Gothic character at the front entrance.

Internally, the church has been altered in a number of stages from its relatively simple configuration. The ceiling was opened up from its original flat linings to a dramatic hammer beam design in the nineteenth century. Floors are generally timber boarded but have been replaced in the aisle and chancel with gifts of mosaic tiles at the turn of the nineteenth century. The patterns are highly intricate and are reasonably intact. A gallery was added at the western end in the 1840s but later removed. Other interior features include stained glass windows, a carved reredos, an organ, choir stalls, a stone pulpit, a brass lectern and oak pews. Many of these fittings have been donated by descendants of early families. There are also memorial plaques on the walls in memory of important local individuals and families.

The church retains its early registers of births, christenings, marriages and burials from 1826 which is a significant local record. Also the church was given Samuel Marsden's bible and Bishop Charles Camidge's seat at the time when Holy Trinity was regarded as a "pro Cathedral" in the early twentieth century. Other historic documents are also in the possession of the church and an inventory of items of moveable heritage should be made and their safe keeping ensured.

The church has been reported to be of good general condition, medium intactness and exceptional overall significance.

=== Rectory and Outbuildings ===
The Rectory is located towards the northern boundary of the church lands. It was completed in 1877 and replaced an earlier parsonage. The Rectory was designed by the leading Colonial ecclesiastical architect Edmund Blacket who was uncle to the Reverend Arthur Blacket, rector at Kelso at the time. The building is a two-storey, face brick design with gabled roofs over a T-shaped plan. It has elements of Gothic design in its composition and is a good example of Blacket's more modest domestic buildings and is highly intact. The building was originally approached with a separate driveway and small carriage loop on the southern side but this was altered in the 1960s. The front wing projects forward and is encircled with a veranda running on three sides of the ground floor. Early concepts for the buildings included upper level balconies but the final design was kept relatively simple. Windows are two-light vertical sashes with brick arches over. Timber shutters were provided by Blacket to most windows although not shown on the original drawings. The roof is sheeted with galvanised iron and has three high brick chimneys. The three gables were finished with highly decorative timber fretwork that gave the relatively plain building some period detail and interest. Unfortunately the fretwork was removed some years ago from all elevations. The replacement of this feature would recover some significance for this building.

Internally the layout was quite simple with a front door under the southern veranda leading to a central hallway with three public rooms (drawing room, dining room and study) with kitchen and scullery at the rear. A polished timber staircase from the hallway leads upstairs to three bedrooms and a bathroom. Walls and ceilings are plastered and painted throughout and joinery is generally polished cedar. The building has been regularly maintained and continuously occupied.

It has been reported to be in good general condition, high intactness, and high overall significance.

=== Garage (former Stables) ===
The only other related structure as part of the group is a small brick outbuilding on the western side. It is a two-roomed, skillion roofed garage. It is likely to have originally constructed as a stables and is noted on the 1877 Blacket site plan as the "New Stables". Its early construction date and association with the former parsonage give this modest outbuilding some significance. It may have been altered and is in poor condition.

It has been reported as being in fair to poor general condition, medium intactness, and medium overall significance.

=== Pioneer Cemetery ===
The Pioneer Cemetery comprises the oldest part of the cemetery which is located closest to the church building. Originally established in 1826, the cemetery has been extended considerably to the north in distinct sections. The cemetery is not a public cemetery and is managed by a cemetery trust with fees charged and a cemetery fund established. Its constant care and maintenance has been a considerable task relying heavily on the gift of volunteer labour from men and women of the congregation.

There are a number of relevant studies that have been carried out by members of the church that provide valuable reference:

- History of Kelso Cemetery and Grounds compiled by Carol Churches, 2004
- Pioneer Cemetery written by Carol Churches, 2000
- Report on the Trees and Shrubs in Holy Trinity Anglican Church Grounds written by Spencer Harvey, 1997

=== Gas storage shed and toilet ===
This is a small brick outbuilding on the eastern side of the church. It is a two-roomed, skillion roofed building with the original gas storage room on the northern side and a public toilet on the southern side. Its construction date is uncertain at this stage but likely to be late 19th century.

It has been reported to be in fair general condition, of unknown intactness and of low overall significance.

=== Gardens and open space ===
The open spaces are significant components that contribute to the character of the property and its environs. The spaces can be divided broadly into the following areas some of which overlap with each other and the other spaces that relate to and define the buildings:

==== Entrance and driveway ====
The point of arrival in Gilmore Street comprises an entrance gateway and steel cattle grid are set back slightly from the road alignment and were constructed in 1960s. The location of the entrance and driveway has remain unchanged probably from the site's earliest development. The existing gateway was rebuilt in the 1960s and comprises relatively plain rendered brick gateposts either side of the entrance together with reused sections of Victorian fencing and 1960s fencing. A small pedestrian gate on the left hand side is likely to date from the Victorian period and is decorative wrought iron with circular motifs in a traditional design. The driveway up to the church remained unsealed until the early 1960s when other site works were carried out including extensive land clearing and kerb and guttering. The original drive divided with one track to the rectory and its carriage loop while the other led to the Church and its small carpark located close to where the columbarium sits today. Drawings do not appear to exist for these tracks but fortunately they are recorded on a 1960s aerial photograph of the church and its grounds.

==== Church foreground ====
The church foreground is regarded as the area on the western side of the Church between Gilmore Street. It is important because it is the relatively dramatic image of the church as seen by most people from Gilmore Street. The area has apparently not been developed at all during the life of the church. The framed view between the trees seen of the grassy slopes ascending softly to the heights with the church sitting dramatically against the skyline contains many symbols and should be conserved.

=== Modifications and dates ===
In addition to the below, there have been continual interior modifications throughout the church's history in relation to liturgical changes.

- 1834 – Foundation stone laid by Arch-Deacon Broughton
- 1835 – First service held on Easter Sunday
- 1836 – Church and cemetery consecrated
- 1838-9 – Alterations and completion of interiors of church including closing of the entrance doors on either side of the tower and the creation of a new, larger door at the base of the tower
- c. 1840 – The first church organ installed
- 1859 – Minor alterations to church interiors
- 1875 – After having been struck twice by lightning, the church tower is replaced. The original iron roof is replaced by galvanised tin
- 1878 – Original parsonage demolished and the new rectory designed by Edmund Blacket. Blacket may also have proposed removing the ceiling of the church to expose the timber roof, a "visionary" architectural improvement
- 1881 – An "autophneumatic gas machine" installed to offer a new lighting system within the church
- 1885 – A new section of cemetery set aside to the east of the original cemetery called the Monumental Cemetery
- c. 1885 – The second organ manufactured by A. Hunter, London installed by this date
- 1888-9 – Local architect James Hine and builder Mr Atkins constructs the frame for a three-light window in the east (to be filled in 1902 by the stained glass window by Edward Coley Burne-Jones and six buttresses added to the exterior. A marble and stone pulpit is installed, imported from Willis & Jones London. Generally the Victorian era witnesses the addition of much ornamentation to the interiors
- 1913-14 – Front facade of church is washed with cement and front steps concreted
- 1925 – Memorial Gates are installed at Gilmour Street entrance to commemorate 100 years of worship
- 1928 – Parish of Kelso subdivides the Glebe and sells some of the land. Money was invested to provide income for the conservation of the church building. Electricity is connected to the church
- 1933 – Vestry added
- 1937-9 – Architects Beddie & Brown replaced galvanised tin roof with asbestos cement tiles. Alterations include reshaping and replacement of church doors, fanlight and floorings
- 1957 – Vestry added
- 1966 – War Memorial Drive constructed, trees planted and watering system laid amid controversies over these changes to the landscape
- 1967 – Lawn Cemetery designed and consecrated
- 1996 – The Memorial Wall is constructed on northern side of the church allowing for a bronze plaque to be set into the wall in memory of family members buried there in unmarked graves
- 1997 – Information Centre and columbarium completed and consecrated
- 2000 – Construction of a substantial parish and community centre or Church Hall behind the rectory, to the north of the church.

== Heritage listing ==
Holy Trinity Kelso is of State significance as the first church built west of the Great Dividing Range, in the Bathurst district near Sydney, in 1835. It has historical associations with the opening up of inland Australia for European occupation by convict labour, in particular, the crossing of the Blue Mountains and the establishment of a Christian settlement in Bathurst in the early 1800s. It has been in continuous use as a place of worship and burial from 1826 until the present day. Its pioneer graveyard is the earliest European cemetery west of the mountains. Its rectory is an intact although modest example of the domestic design of the renowned ecclesiastic architect Edmund Blacket. The group is likely to be of State and local significance for its associations with Anglican ministers including the Reverends Samuel Marsden, Rowland Hassall, Thomas Hassall and William Grant Broughton, and architects including Blacket as well as the Bathurst pioneer and original grantee James Blackman. Although the design of the original church building is naive and its author unknown, the church has a landmark position sited impressively at the top of a hill. Extensive alterations and additions have been carried within the group by prominent architects, adding considerably to the aesthetic significance of the church and demonstrating a high degree of religious commitment and technical achievement for a pioneer settlement where materials and skilled trades were in short supply. The fine stained glass east window of the church was manufactured c. 1902 in England to a design by Pre-Raphaelite artist Edward Coley Burne-Jones. The church organ (c.1882) is one of few Hunter organs to have been imported into Australia from England, and is intact. The Holy Trinity Church Group is of State social significance to the Anglican Church in NSW as a pioneering parish still using the site for worship. The archaeological potential of the Holy Trinity Group is of State significance because of the site's early settlement, continued use and limited disturbance. It is representative at a State level for retaining many of the original elements of a functioning nineteenth century Church of England property - including the rectory and the burial ground, as well as the church. It is of State significance for its rarity as an intact group of ecclesiastic structures in continuous religious usage since the early years of inland occupation of Australia.

Holy Trinity Anglican Church was listed on the New South Wales State Heritage Register on 14 January 2011 having satisfied the following criteria.

The place is important in demonstrating the course, or pattern, of cultural or natural history in New South Wales.

Holy Trinity Kelso is of State significance as the oldest church in inland Australia. It was the first church built west of the Great Dividing Range, near Sydney, and completed in 1835. It has historical associations with the opening up of inland Australia for European occupation by convict labour, in particular the crossing of the Blue Mountains, the establishment of the district of Bathurst in the early nineteenth century and the establishment of the Anglican faith in Australia. It has been in continuous use as a place of worship and burial from 1826 until the present day. Its pioneer graveyard is the earliest European cemetery west of the mountains. It was one of very few churches marked on Mitchell's surveys of the Nineteen Counties of NSW in the early 1830s.

The place has a strong or special association with a person, or group of persons, of importance of cultural or natural history of New South Wales's history.

Holy Trinity Kelso is of State and local significance for its associations with Anglican ministers including the Reverends Samuel Marsden, Rowland Hassall, Thomas Hassall, William Grant Broughton and John Espy Keane, architect Edmund Blacket and his nephew Arthur Russell Blacket. The land upon which the church is built was first granted to James Blackman, who with his father and brother were significant colonial pioneers in the State's central west. Samuel Marsden was the Principal Colonial Chaplain and later, his grandson, also Samuel Marsden, was the first Bishop of Bathurst who attended the first Easter service held in 1835. Rowland Hassall conducted the first sermon in the Bathurst district, Thomas Hassall was appointed the first Chaplain of the district and William Broughton, Bishop of Australia, laid the foundation stone of the church and made tours of the district in view of administering the faith. Reverend John Espy Keane of Kelso was the first clergyman appointed to the church and his bible (dated 1772) is still in the possession of the church. The prominent colonial architect Edmund Blacket designed the Rectory in 1878 when his nephew Canon Arthur Russell Blacket was serving there (1876–1884).

The place is important in demonstrating aesthetic characteristics and/or a high degree of creative or technical achievement in New South Wales.

The Holy Trinity Church, Rectory and Cemetery are of State and local significance for its aesthetic values. Although the design of the original church building is naive and its author unknown, the church has a landmark position sited impressively at the top of a hill. Extensive alterations and additions have been carried out by prominent architects including Benjamin and Joseph Backhouse, Edmund Blacket, James Hine and J.J. Copeland, adding considerably to the aesthetic significance of the group. It demonstrates a high degree of religious commitment and technical achievement for a pioneer settlement where materials and skilled trades were in short supply. The Rectory, designed by renowned ecclesiastical architect Edmund Blacket in 1877, is intact and is a good example of his more modest domestic work in New South Wales. The church contains a number of notable stained glass windows including the east window which was manufactured c. 1902 in England to a design by Sir Edward Coley Burne-Jones, the renowned pre-Raphaelite English painter, designer, artist and illustrator. An overview of stained glass windows in Australia has furthermore singled out Holy Trinity as being "prized for its windows by Ashwin and Falconer'.

The place has strong or special association with a particular community or cultural group in New South Wales for social, cultural or spiritual reasons.

The Holy Trinity Church Group is of State significance for its role as a pioneering parish within the Anglican Church in Australia. The church building has significance for many local residents and families who over many years have donated important elements such as stained glass windows, organs, internal finishes and other components that make up the character and symbolism of the place today. The church and grounds have significance to the residents of Kelso Parish today as its principal parish church and place of worship. The building and its grounds have ongoing significance as a place of marriages, christenings and burials representing the passage of life. The cemetery has significance to the community of the Bathurst district being the oldest in the region and containing the graves of many of the district's pioneers and the local families who worked to shape the district into what it is today.

The place has potential to yield information that will contribute to an understanding of the cultural or natural history of New South Wales.

The archaeological potential of the Holy Trinity Group is of State significance because of its early settlement, continued use and limited disturbance. The first buildings may have been constructed prior to the church period between 1818 and 1826 but do not remain today although archaeological evidence has been found close to the rectory in recent years. The cemetery generally has high archaeological potential because of its early initiation and continued use, able to demonstrate a wide range of social customs and mores related to death and burial. The cemetery headstones are an important source of historical material from 1826 to present day regarding family history within the region. The parish registers for Holy Trinity are some of the earliest in the region and are well preserved. The church had an auto pneumatic gas machine and lighting installed relatively early in 1881 and remnants of that system may still remain throughout the building.

The place possesses uncommon, rare or endangered aspects of the cultural or natural history of New South Wales.

The Holy Trinity Church Group is of State significance for its rarity as the church in inland Australia, and for being in continuous religious usage since that time. The Holy Trinity Church organ is likely to be of State significance for its rarity as one of perhaps ten Hunter organs manufactured in England (c.1882) to have been imported into Australia - and this one is highly intact . Organs from this firm are widely recognised for their power and brilliance. The tonal design and style of pipe work illustrate the influence of the German organ builder, Edmund Schultze, on nineteenth century English organ building. The first church organ (now removed) was said to be one of the first musical instruments of any size to be brought across the Blue Mountains. Furthermore, the east window is rare, having been manufactured c. 1902 in England to a design by Sir Edward Coley Burne-Jones, the renowned pre-Raphaelite English painter, designer, artist and illustrator.

The place is important in demonstrating the principal characteristics of a class of cultural or natural places/environments in New South Wales.

The Holy Trinity Church Group is of State significance for its representative values in retaining many of the original elements of a functioning nineteenth century Church of England property - including a rectory and burial ground as well as the church. Furthermore, the simplicity of the original design and form of the church is representative of the fragile, pioneer nature of settlement and typical of many early church plans from standard drawings. The growth of the region, increased population, greater stability, larger congregations and greater prosperity in the nineteenth and twentieth centuries made possible the later additions and alterations, which are also representative of changes sustained by church building in NSW over time. The rectory, dated 1877, is intact and is a good example of Edmund Blacket's more modest domestic work in New South Wales.

== See also ==
- List of Anglican churches in New South Wales
- Australian non-residential architectural styles
