= Epping Boys High School =

Location
- 213 Vimiera Road, Marsfield, NSW 2122; Marsfield, New South Wales; Australia; 33.7699°S 151.0989°E

Information
- Type: High school
- Motto: Strive to Achieve
- Established: 1957
- Educational authority: NSW Department of Education
- Principal: Jessica Schadel
- Staff: 76
- Grades: 7–12
- Years offered: 7–12
- Gender: Male
- Enrolment: 1400
- Colors: Green, gold
- Website: eppingboy-h.schools.nsw.gov.au

Epping Boys High School is a comprehensive, public high school located in Marsfield, New South Wales, Australia, established in 1957. The current principal is Jessica Schadel.

== Achievements ==
As well as high achievements in the creative and performing arts, the school has a strong sporting and academic record. The school has been placed on the Centre of Excellence program.

On 15 April 2010, the school hosted a Community Cabinet meeting chaired by the Prime Minister of Australia, Kevin Rudd.

In the 2016/17 cricket season, Epping Boys High School won both the Challenge Cup and Allan Davidson Shield, defeating Figtree High and Endeavour Sports High respectively. In 2022 soccer season, they defeated local Randwick Boys High School to win the Puma Cup State Knockout.

== Houses ==
The school has four houses, which are based upon prominent figures of Eastwood, Epping, Marsfield and Ryde during the 19th Century. Pupils competing in sport, academic and other various events earn points for their houses. At the end of the year, the house with the most points win the house cup. The houses are:

- Darvall (red)
- Harris (yellow)
- Midson (blue)
- Terry (green)

== Alumni ==
- John Abernethy – NSW State Coroner (2000–2007)
- Adam Biddle – former Sydney FC football player
- Mark Calder – Anglican Bishop of Bathurst
- Ed Craig – U20 Australian Rugby Union player in the 2016 U-20 Rugby World Cup in Manchester, England
- Iva Davies – musician, lead singer of Icehouse
- Stuart Dickinson – former rugby referee, most capped Australian referee at international level
- Michael Ebeid – chief executive of SBS 2011–2018
- Sam Gallagher – U20 Socceroos player in the 2009 FIFA U-20 World Cup
- Brendan Kerry – figure skater
- Kevin Kim – member/lead vocal of South Korean boy band ZE:A
- Paul Murray – Sky News Australia presenter
- Jack Newton – professional golfer
- Brett Papworth – Wallaby
- Geoffrey Robertson – QC and Rhodes Scholar (1970)
- Craig Shipley – baseball player, second Australian to play Major League Baseball
- Ryan Teague – Melbourne Victory football player, U17 Joeyroos captain and the Socceroos
- Alex Wilkinson – Footballer for Sydney FC and the Socceroos

== Controversies ==
=== 2006 teacher drug-supply case ===
In 2006, a casual teacher at Epping Boys High School was charged with supplying cannabis to a student under the age of 16. The then‑NSW Education Minister Carmel Tebbutt expressed outrage that she had not been informed earlier and ordered an investigation into the school's handling of the incident. The teacher faced court on the charge, and the Department of Education stated that if convicted, he would not be re-employed in the system.

=== 2015 alleged extremist preaching ===
In 2015, a 17‑year‑old student at the school became the focus of a counter‑terrorism investigation after being reported for allegedly preaching extremist Islamic views to classmates in the school playground. The incident was referred to police by school staff, and counselling was offered to affected students. The NSW Government subsequently launched a review of school prayer groups across the state.

=== 2016 former student terrorism plot ===
In 2016, former student Tamim Khaja was arrested and charged with planning a terrorist attack in Sydney and attempting to travel overseas to join the Islamic State. Authorities alleged he had tried to acquire a firearm and had previously been investigated for extremist behaviour while attending the school in 2015. The incident had contributed to the earlier government review of school prayer activities.

=== 2020 COVID-19 outbreak and closure ===
In early March 2020, Epping Boys High School became the first government school in New South Wales to temporarily close after a Year 11 student tested positive for COVID-19. With fewer than 30 confirmed cases in the state at the time, school closures were still rare and the event received widespread media attention as part of early pandemic public health responses. Students and staff were sent home for precautionary quarantine, the premises were professionally cleaned, and the school reopened the following week after authorities deemed it safe.

=== 2022 large cash gifts incident ===
In 2022, a Year 7 student reportedly brought around $27,000 in cash to school, spending some on online gaming and distributing the remainder in cash and gift cards to classmates. The money was part of a family trust fund. School leadership responded by contacting families and using the incident as a teachable moment on financial responsibility.

== See also ==
- List of government schools in New South Wales
