= Normanby, North Yorkshire =

Normanby, North Yorkshire could refer to:

- Normanby, Redcar and Cleveland
- Normanby, Ryedale
