= Gloria Shipp =

Australia's first Indigenous woman Anglican priest (born 1948)

Reverend Gloria Shipp
- Born: 1948 (age 77–78)
- Citizenship: Australia
- Education: Nungalinya College, Darwin
- Years active: 1994–
- Known for: Walkabout Ministries First Aboriginal woman Anglican priest First woman chair of National Aboriginal and Torres Strait Islander Anglican Council

Gloria Shipp (born 1948) is an Anglican priest, the first Aboriginal woman ordained as deacon and then as priest in the Anglican Church of Australia and the first woman elected Chair of the National Aboriginal and Torres Strait Islander Anglican Council. She is of the Gamilaroi/Kamilaroi nation and lives on Wiradjuri country. Shipp founded Walkabout Ministries as an accessible, culturally sensitive church that embraces Aboriginal and Torres Strait Islander people.

== Personal life ==
Shipp was born and raised in Nyngan New South Wales then moved to Dubbo in the 1980s. She is married to Edward "Eddie" Shipp (Wiradjuri) and they have three adult sons, grandchildren and great-grandchildren.

== Ministry ==
=== Ordination ===
Shipp obtained a Diploma of Theology at Nungalinya College in Darwin in 1994 then was ordained deacon the same year and given permission to officiate in the Diocese of the Northern Territory in 1995.

Shipp has mainly ministered in Cobar, Dubbo, Nyngan and Warren New South Wales. She was ordained priest on 21 December 1996 by Bishop Bruce Wilson in Holy Trinity Anglican Church Dubbo in the Anglican Diocese of Bathurst. Her ordination featured in Australian and international news media. The ordination service combined traditional Anglican and Aboriginal symbolism; her husband and son held the bowl of burning gum leaves outside the church for people to pass through the cleansing smoke, an Aboriginal flag was placed along the side of the sanctuary, Jangarra dancers with clicking sticks danced in the clergy procession, Shipp wore a cassock with Australian animals decorating the hem, after the Anglican ordination her hair and face were smeared by two dancers with white ochre symbolising purity and spirituality and during communion her cousin played the didgeridoo.

Edwards and Frapell stated that "Her ordination added strength to the hopes that a self-determinist Aboriginal ministry would flourish in the diocese".

=== Ministries ===
Shipp was first a lay minister with oversight of the Koori Anglican Fellowship in Dubbo in 1993 then after ordination as a deacon she became Deacon-in-Charge from 1995 then Priest-in-Charge of the fellowship from 1996 to 2002 and Chaplain 2002–2003. Shipp established Walkabout Ministries in about 2008 under the auspices of the Anglican Board of Mission (ABM). Shipp became Assistant Priest at Holy Trinity in 2009.

Shipp envisioned Walkabout Ministries as an accessible, culturally sensitive church that embraced Aboriginal and Torres Strait Islander people and was willing to meet them where they were. Her work has also been supported by the Bush Church Aid Society of Australia. Through Walkabout Ministries Shipp runs regular Elders Outreach Groups, Women's Camps, Christian rallies and reconciliation activities. During Lent in 2011, Shipp undertook a speaking tour organised by the ABM.

She was the juvenile justice chaplain at the Orana Juvenile Justice Centre in Dubbo (2008–2017?). (Note: The formal end date of her chaplaincy is unclear. Two sources seems to indicate Shipp resigned as chaplain in either 2017 or 2020 and another source indicates she continued to visit the centre even after she finished as chaplain.) Shipp gave Bible talks, officiated at services and counselled boys in the centre. Of her work there, Shipp said "I always ask the boys what they want to be and then I pray for them...I tell it to them straight. God doesn't keep a record but the law of the land does. I try to encourage them to make a better life for themselves".

Shipp was a member of the House of Clergy at the Anglican Church of Australia General Synod 2010 and is an official member of the Diocese of Bathurst Synod. She is a life member and former chairperson (2012–?) of the National Aboriginal and Torres Strait Islander Anglican Council. She represented the Council at international meetings of the Anglican Indigenous Network and was a member of its Standing Committee.

Shipp was named Dubbo Elder of the Year in 2019 and the church hall of Holy Trinity, Dubbo was named "The Gloria Shipp Room" on her move from Dubbo to Nyngan in 2021.

In 2022 Shipp was commissioned as a Companion of the Company of the Good Shepherd. She leads church services and conducts baptisms, weddings and funerals in the Anglican Diocese of Bathurst where churches do not have a priest.
