= Riseborough Hall =

Mansion in North Yorkshire, England

Coordinates: 54.2365°N 0.8478°W

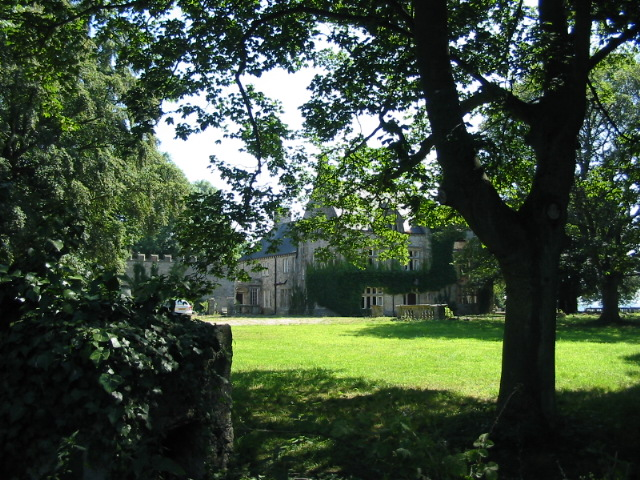
Riseborough Hall seen from the public road

Riseborough Hall is a mansion in the parish of Normanby in North Yorkshire, England.
