= Listed buildings in Normanby, Ryedale =

Normanby is a civil parish in the county of North Yorkshire, England. It contains nine listed buildings that are recorded in the National Heritage List for England. Of these, one is listed at Grade II*, the middle of the three grades, and the others are at Grade II, the lowest grade. The parish contains the village of Normanby and the surrounding area. The listed buildings include a church, a building in the churchyard, houses, a bridge, a farmhouse and farm buildings, and a milepost.

== Key ==
Grade	Criteria
II*	Particularly important buildings of more than special interest
II	Buildings of national importance and special interest

== Buildings ==
Name and location	Photograph	Date	Notes	Grade
St Andrew's Church; 54.22542°N 0.87439°W		Mid-12th century	The church has been altered and extended through the centuries, particularly by Temple Moore in 1894–95. It is built in sandstone, the roof of the nave and porch are tiled, and the chancel has a stone slate roof. The church consists of a nave, a north aisle, a south porch, and a chancel with a north vestry. On the west gable is a gabled bellcote with twin arches and a cross. In the porch is a small re-set Norman window, and the doorway contains part of a roll-moulded arch.	II*
Normanby House; 54.22597°N 0.87628°W	—	1723	A rectory that was remodelled in 1825, and later a private house, it is in sandy limestone and has a pantile roof. There are two storeys and three bays. The central doorway has a patterned fanlight and a pediment. To its left is a canted bay window, to the right is a tripartite sash window, and the upper floor contains sash windows.	II
Normanby Bridge; 54.22342°N 0.87294°W		Mid-18th century	The bridge carries Barugh Lane over the River Seven. It is in sandstone, and consists of a single semicircular arch between tapering abutments. The bridge has a chamfered band under a parapet with shaped coping.	II
Outbuilding southwest of St Andrew's Church, wall and gateposts 54.22520°N 0.87478°W	—	18th century	The outbuilding in the corner of the churchyard is in sandstone and has a roof partly in pantile and partly in stone slate, with a coped gable and shaped kneelers. There is one storey, the gable end faces the street, and it contains a doorway and a window. The wall and gateposts are in sandstone, the wall with cambered coping, and the gateposts are chamfered.	II
Bridge Farmhouse, wall and gate piers 54.22372°N 0.87100°W		Late 18th century	The house, which was later extended, is in red brick, with a cogged eaves course, and a blue pantile roof with coped gables and shaped kneelers. There are two storeys and three bays, and a rear wing with two storeys and two bays. The doorway has a divided fanlight, and the windows are a mix of sashes, some horizontally-sliding, and casements, all with segmental-arched heads. The garden wall is in red brick with chamfered quoins and sandstone coping, and the gate piers are in sandstone, they are panelled, and have moulded cornice caps.	II
Farm buildings north of Bridge Farmhouse; 54.22394°N 0.87112°W	—	Late 18th century	The buildings consist of a barn with attached byres, a gin gang and a cart shed, and are in red brick with a pantile roof. The barn has two storeys and four bays with an extension on the left, and contains stable doors, windows and slit vents. The projecting gin gang has two segmental-arched openings and an owl hole.	II
Normanby Hill; 54.22636°N 0.87801°W	—	Late 18th century	The house is in limestone with sandstone dressings, quoins, a moulded eaves course, and a blue pantile roof with coped gables and shaped kneelers. There are two storeys and four bays, and flanking wings with one storey and attics and one bay. On the front is an Ionic porch with a moulded frieze, a moulded cornice and a pediment with a fox in low relief, and the doorway has reeded pilaster jambs. The windows are tripartite sashes, and on the roof are gabled dormers. The wings contain a tripartite sash on the ground floor and a half-dormer above with a sash, and with lintels, one initialled and dated, and keystones.	II
Blacksmith's House, railings and gateposts 54.22538°N 0.87521°W	—	Early 19th century	The house is in red brick, rendered on the right return, with a pantile roof. There are two storeys, two bays in the main block, and to the left is a lower one-bay wing. In the centre of the main block is a timber porch, both parts contain a doorway and sash windows. Enclosing the garden are railings with spearhead tips, urn-headed standards and mace-headed gateposts.	II
Milepost; 54.22897°N 0.87335°W	—	Late 19th century	The milepost is on the east side of Malton Road. It is in cast iron, about 0.55 metres (1 ft 10 in) tall, and has a triangular plan and a sloping upper face. On each side is a pointing hand, on the left side is the distance to Malton, and on the right side to Kirkbymoorside.	II
