= Thornton Riseborough =

Township in the parish of Normanby in Yorkshire

Coordinates: 54.232°N 0.864°W

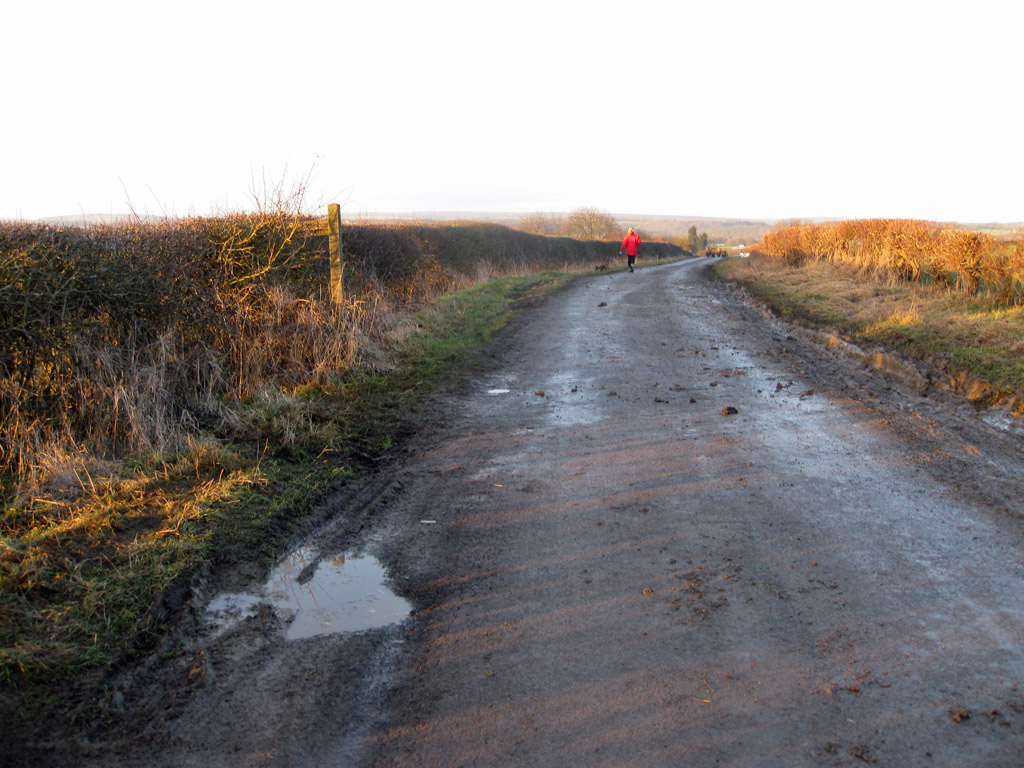

- Location within North Yorkshire
- Civil parish: Normanby
- Unitary authority: North Yorkshire
- Ceremonial county: North Yorkshire
- Region: Yorkshire and the Humber
- Country: England
- Sovereign state: United Kingdom
- Police: North Yorkshire
- Fire: North Yorkshire
- Ambulance: Yorkshire

Thornton Riseborough is a former civil parish, now in the parish of Normanby, in North Yorkshire, England. In 1971 the parish had a population of 18. Until 1974 it was in the North Riding of Yorkshire.

== History ==
The name "Thornton Riseborough" means 'Thorn-tree farm/settlement below brushwood hill'. Thornton Riseborough was recorded in the Domesday Book as Tornentun/Tornitun. Thornton-Risebrough was formerly a township in the parish of Normanby, in 1866 Thornton Risebrough became a separate civil parish, in 1894 it became part of Kirkby Moorside Rural District and in 1934 it became part of Pickering Rural District. In 1974 it became part of the non-metropolitan district of Ryedale and the county of North Yorkshire. On 1 April 1986 the parish was abolished and merged with Normanby. In 2023 the area became part of North Yorkshire district.
