= All Saints Cathedral Bells =

Bathurst Cathedral Bells
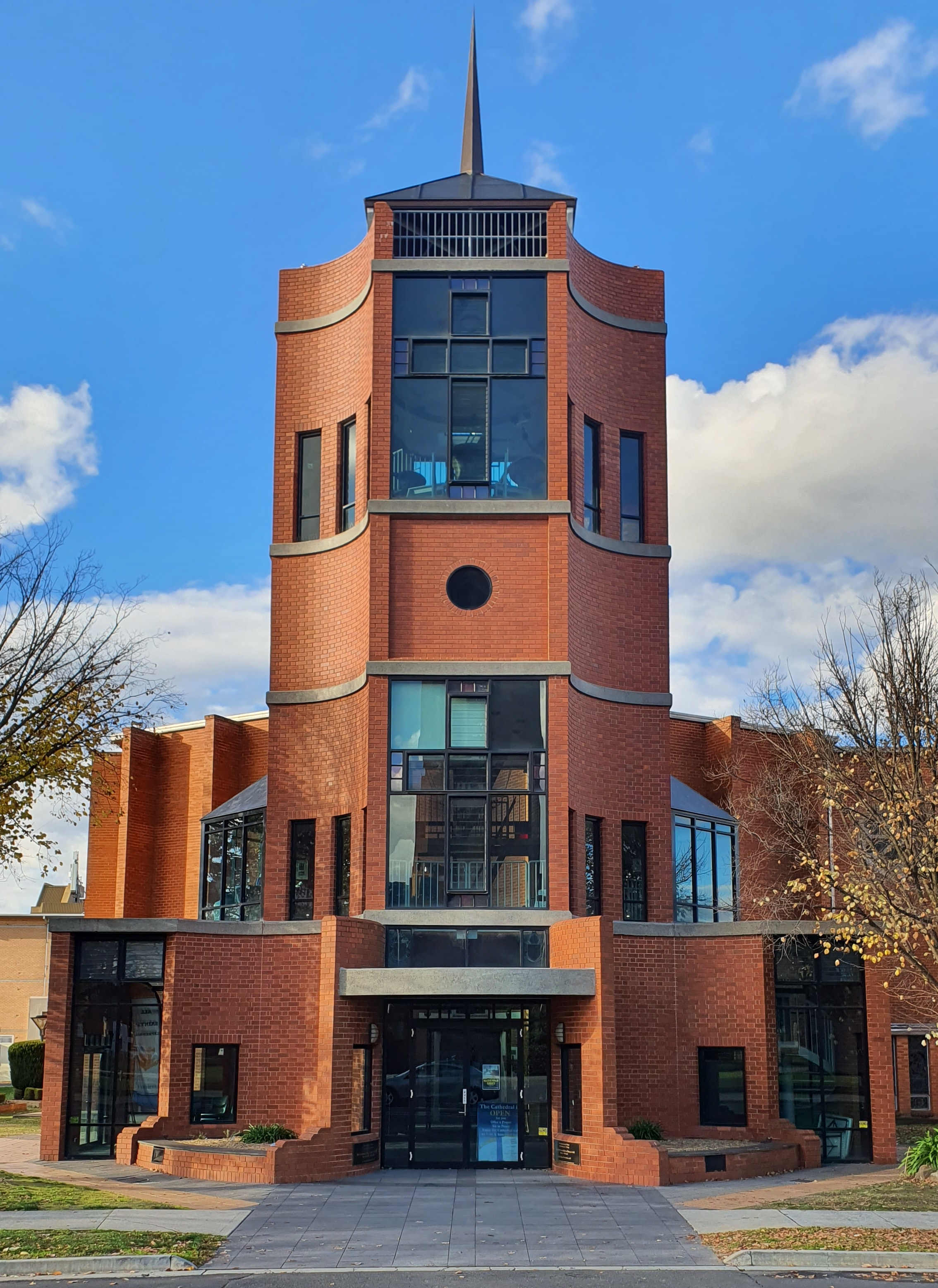
- New tower constructed in 2009 to house the bells

- Location within New South Wales Location within Australia
- 33.4174°S 149.5797°E
- Location: All Saints Anglican Cathedral, Church Street, Bathurst, Bathurst Region, New South Wales, Australia

History
- Built: 1853–1855

Site notes
- Owner: Anglican Church

New South Wales Heritage Register
- Official name: Bathurst Cathedral Bells; Bathurst Bells
- Type: state heritage (movable / collection)
- Designated: 10 September 2004
- Reference no.: 1707
- Type: Other – Religion
- Category: Religion
- Builders: John Warner and Sons, Crescent Foundry of London, England

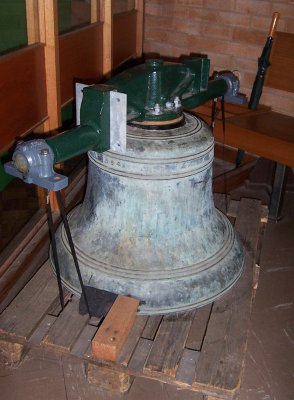
One of the cathedral bells on display in the foyer of All Saints Anglican Cathedral, Bathurst, 2004

The All Saints Cathedral Bells are heritage-listed church bells at All Saints Anglican Cathedral, Church Street, Bathurst, in the Central West region of New South Wales, Australia. They were built from 1853 to 1855 by John Warner and Sons, Crescent Foundry of London, England. They were added to the New South Wales State Heritage Register on 10 September 2004.

== History ==
=== The Anglican parish of Bathurst ===
The first Anglican parish west of the Blue Mountains was established in 1825 at Kelso. In 1848 the All Saints Anglican church was built in Bathurst to the design by Edmund Blacket; it became a cathedral in 1870. The incumbent parish priest in the initial period was Rev. Thomas Sharpe (whose private rectory, built 1845, was on the corner of Russell and Peel Streets and is now known as Miss Traill's House).

=== Commissioning the Bathurst Cathedral Bells ===
A fund was soon opened and managed by Thomas Sloman, a prominent Bathurst businessman, to raise money for a peal of bells for the new church. The sizable sum of £800 was raised by public subscription and in February 1851 Mr Sloman sailed for England to order the six bells from the Warner & Sons Crescent Foundry of London. Meanwhile, the Blacket-designed bell tower was constructed. Although the bells arrived in Sydney in February 1855, the transport of heavy bells over the Blue Mountains was difficult, and the church had to depend on free transport at a time when many people were rushing to the goldfields nearby. The bells came one by one from May 1855 and were not completely hung until 8 December 1855. The bells rang out their first peal in Bathurst early in 1856. Owing to a perpetuated piece of misinformation, it has often been stated that the All Saints bells were the first to be pealed in Australia, but there were in fact bells long before in Hobart and Melbourne, and at least three had been in existence in Sydney, one from as early as 1807. St Mary's Cathedral in Sydney had a peal of large bells by 1844. However the Bathurst Cathedral Bells were the first to be rung outside the colonial capitals.

=== The smallest bell damaged ===
A few days after the bells were in place, on 13 December 1856, the Bathurst townsfolk learned that the Russian fortress of Sebastopol had been captured by the allied forces fighting in the Crimean War. Spontaneous celebrations began, with bonfires, fireworks and much singing and cheering. At about ten o'clock, while the evening festivities were at their height, some excitable lads thought of ringing the new bells to add to the festivities. Ropes had not even been attached, so iron bars were taken high into the tower and the bells were struck by the unruly lot, who had locked the doors against likely opposition. Even though Churchwarden Wise, with the help of a constable, was able to eject the intruders, the exuberants broke in again in the small hours and once more attacked the bells. Whether it was this rough treatment or not is not recorded, but the smallest of the bells was later found to be cracked, and in 1860 was returned to its foundry for recasting and was eventually re-shipped to Bathurst.

=== Chiming not ringing ===
The bells were rung regularly up until the early 1890s, when the swing of the bells when rung was discovered to be rocking the tower, and this was causing the cathedral walls to crack. At this time full circle ringing was replaced by simple chiming, i.e., the striking of still bells. While chiming was heard in Bathurst on Sundays until about 1969, no person living has ever heard them ringing full circle in the English tradition, which gives a quite different (and more resonant) sound. The sound of bells pealing is also quite different from the bells of a carillon, which play melodies rather than the mathematical permutations entailed in "ringing the changes". The bells were removed immediately prior to the demolition of the tower in 1970.

=== Recent history of the Bathurst bells 1970–2004 ===
After the demolition of the Blacket Cathedral building and bell tower in 1970, the six Bathurst Cathedral Bells languished in the open on the grass behind the Bathurst Courthouse nearby. In 1988, with the help of public subscription, they were sent to England for restoration by Whitechapel Bell Foundry and Eayre & Smith. They were returned to Bathurst in 1992 and have been held in storage by Dawsons Removals & Storage P/L at Lot 3 Littlebourne Street, Kelso, except for the one bell on display in the narthex or foyer of the cathedral. In 2000 a group of concerned people not associated with the parish came together to seek ways of reinstalling the silent cathedral bells. In 2002 at the instigation of Bishop Richard Hurford a community committee called the Cathedral Bells of Bathurst Supporters was formed under the chair of the dean of the cathedral the Very Reverend Andrew Sempell. A community appeal for reinstallation of the bells into a free-standing tower on site, with the addition of two new bells, was launched in September 2003.

=== Surviving colonial bells in NSW ===
In 2004 there are ten surviving peals of nineteenth-century bells in New South Wales, all Anglican except for St Benedict's and St Mary's. In chronological order of their manufacture they are:

- St Benedict's (Roman Catholic), Sydney 1850
- Christ Church St Laurence, Sydney 1852–53
- All Saints, Bathurst, 1854.
- All Saints, Parramatta 1856–60
- St Philip's, Sydney 1858
- St Mark's, Darling Point, Sydney 1862
- St Jude's, Randwick 1864
- St Paul's, Maitland 1868–69
- St Clement's, Yass 1869, 1880
- St Mary's Cathedral (Roman Catholic), Sydney 1882

Seven of these are within the metropolitan area of Sydney/Parramatta. The only country towns represented are Bathurst, Maitland and Yass. The most common English bell-founder represented is Whitechapel (responsible for five peals: St Benedict's, All Saints Parramatta, St Mark's Darling Point, St Mary's RC Cathedral and St Philip's). Only the Bathurst bells were cast by Warner & Sons.

=== Warner & Sons ===
John Warner and Sons of Cripplegate in London, with a foundry at Stockton-on-Tees, was a highly regarded firm in this rather esoteric business. Created in 1739, the firm began to found bells in 1788 and continued (with a break between 1816 and 1850) until the firm closed in 1949, run by the Warner family for 210 years.

Although all the records of the Warner foundry were reportedly destroyed during World War II, one researcher is aware of only four other Warner-made bell peals in Australia as well as two in New Zealand:

- St. Paul, Murrurundi (north of Scone in NSW) (10 bells, 1883, baton keyboard chime)
- Town Hall, Adelaide, (8 bells, 1866, ringing + chime barrel)
- St. John Cathedral, Brisbane (8 bells, 1876, augmented to 10 by Whitechapel in 1986)
- St. George Cathedral, Perth (only 1 bell remains of 8 cast in 1902)
- St. Peter, Wellington, NZ (8 bells, late 1880s; hung for ringing, but have only been chimed for decades because of weakness of the tower)
- St. George Cathedral, Auckland, NZ (8 bells, 1907, except one recast by Whitechapel in 1972).

At their Stockton on Tees foundry in 1856, just a couple of years after completing the Bathurst cathedral bells, Warner & Sons cast the first version of the largest and still most famous bell in Great Britain, Big Ben. However the 16 ton (16,000 kg) bell developed a disastrous 1.2 metre crack while being tested in 1857. It was broken up and recast by George Mears of the Whitechapel Bell Foundry (this recast bell weighing nearly 14,000 kg also cracked two months into service but was kept, turned slightly and struck with a lighter hammer). Warner's best-known achievement still at work is the quarter-bells of Big Ben. In New South Wales, their only full peal in potentially working order is the Bathurst set. Although there is a set of ten small Warner bells at Murrurundi which was installed in 1883 and is still there, it is thought that these bells are too light to constitute a viable peal. There is a fine 1889 single bell by the firm at St Paul's Burwood and a remarkable quarter-chiming clock-bell of 1890 still in the court-house at Wollongong.

== Description ==
The collection of six church bells was manufactured by Warner and Sons Crescent Foundry London in 1854 for the All Saints Anglican church in Bathurst. The bell tower was demolished in 1970 and while one bell is currently on display in the narthex or foyer to the All Saints Cathedral, the other five are currently in storage at Dawson's Removals and Storage, Lot 3 Littlebourne Street Kelso. The curtilage includes only the foundry-cast bell-metal bells themselves.

Around the top of each bell is written "Warner and Sons Crescent Foundry London", and midway down the bell is a crest and 1854. They were restored in England and returned to Bathurst in 1992 by Eayre & Smith's Foundry, Birmingham. Bells are cast in bell metal, a type of bronze, and are large, weighing between 201 and 468 kg. They are tuned to a normal diatonic scale. Each bell is attached to a "headstock". None of the attachments are original.

Specifications:

- Bell Treble – diameter 679 mm – height 505 mm – weight 201 kg – note F 15 cents.
- Bell Second – diameter 733 mm – height 546 mm – weight 251 kg – note E flat 17 cents.
- Bell Third – diameter 768 mm – height 572 mm – weight 289 kg – note D flat 14 cents.
- Bell Fourth – diameter 860 mm – height 664 mm – weight 379 kg – note C 19 cents.
- Bell Fifth – diameter 914 mm – height 686 mm – weight 468 kg – note B flat 14 cents.
- Bell Tenor – diameter 940 mm – height 660 mm – weight 395 kg – note A flat 20 cents.

It is unusual for the tenor bell to be smaller and lighter than the bell tuned above it. However letters from consultants Whitechapel Foundry and Eare & Smith have advised that the bells have tuned up well despite this discrepancy.

This item is one of moveable heritage and the owner's aim is to:

- Rehang and reinstate the bells in a tower compatible with the 1971 Cathedral, where they can be once again used as a peal swinging full circle, suitable for change ringing, and as a peal for the whole community of Bathurst.
- To acquire and hang two extra bells to make a standard peal of eight.
- To name and engrave the bells with each benefactor's chosen name.
- Replace the "Tenor Bell", being an odd size and weight. Its historical significance will be maintained by its becoming a centrepiece in the educational interpretive display of the lower tower.

The bells are a complete set of six, all dated 1854, and entirely intact except for one bell that was returned to the foundry temporarily in 1860 to repair a crack.

The bells have been restored and are presently in storage and so not capable of being rung. One bell is on display at the Bathurst All Saints Anglican Cathedral, Church Street Bathurst.

The future replacement of the 6th bell is proposed, as well as buying two additional bells to complete a traditional peal of eight bells.

== Heritage listing ==
The Bathurst Cathedral Bells are "moveable heritage" of State significance for being an intact collection of large church bells and the first to be rung in NSW outside Sydney. The six bells, each weighing between 200 and 470 kg, are rare in Australia for being cast by Warner and Sons Crescent Foundry London in the mid 1850s. The original All Saints Cathedral bell tower, designed by Edmund Blacket c. 1860, was demolished in 1970 largely because of structural problems arising from the ringing of the bells during the nineteenth century. Thus the bells are "grounded" in storage but there are plans to construct a new bell tower to re-house them on the site. The Bathurst peal is the only known collection of bells in New South Wales by one of the great English bell-founders, other than the inoperable set at Murrurundi, and it is the third earliest workable peal to survive in the State.

Bathurst Cathedral Bells was listed on the New South Wales State Heritage Register on 10 September 2004 having satisfied the following criteria.

The place is important in demonstrating the course, or pattern, of cultural or natural history in New South Wales.

The Bathurst Cathedral Bells are "moveable heritage" of State significance for being the first to be rung outside Sydney, Melbourne and Hobart. The constitute the only known peal in New South Wales by one of the great English bell-founders, other than the inoperable set at Murrurundi, and the third earliest workable peal to survive in the State.

The place has a strong or special association with a person, or group of persons, of importance of cultural or natural history of New South Wales's history.

The Bathurst Cathedral Bells are of State significance for their association with the Warner and Sons Crescent Foundry London, which cast the bells in the mid 1850s. This foundry was a major nineteenth century English bellfoundry (along with Taylors and Whitechapels) which cast the first Big Ben bell for Westminster in 1856 (a 16,000 kg bell which unfortunately developed a major crack when being tested and was melted down and recast elsewhere). The collection is likely to be of local significance for their association with Edmund Blacket (the architect of the original All Saints church building), Thomas Sloman (a prominent early Bathurst businessman who raised the funds and travelled to England to commission the bells) and the Reverend Thomas Sharpe (who was the Bathurst parish priest at the time).

The place is important in demonstrating aesthetic characteristics and/or a high degree of creative or technical achievement in New South Wales.

The Bathurst Cathedral Bells are of local significance for their aesthetic value as an intact collection of large church bells manufactured by John Warner & Sons Crescent Foundry London and ranging in weight from 200 to 470 kg. Manufactured in England in the mid-1850s, one bell is currently on display in the foyer of the cathedral while the rest are in storage; however the planned re-hanging of the bells would greatly increase their aesthetic and technical significance.

The place has a strong or special association with a particular community or cultural group in New South Wales for social, cultural or spiritual reasons.

The Bathurst Cathedral Bells are of local significance because of the esteem in which they have always been held in Bathurst, by Anglican parishioners at the least. The substantial amount of £800 required to pay for them was raised by public subscription by 1851 – just prior to the gold rush. It is largely as a result of contemporary public interest that plans are afoot to build a new bell tower to re-hang them near the new cathedral.

The place has potential to yield information that will contribute to an understanding of the cultural or natural history of New South Wales.

The Bathurst Cathedral Bells are of State significance for their research potential as an intact group of six large colonial-era church bells manufactured by Warner and Sons Crescent Foundry London. They originally required considerable expertise and engineering skills to build, transport and hang and will require such again if they are to be re-hung as planned in the future.

The place possesses uncommon, rare or endangered aspects of the cultural or natural history of New South Wales.

The Bathurst Cathedral Bells are of State significance for being a rare group of intact regional colonial-period church bells manufactured by Warner and Sons Crescent Foundry London. Of ten surviving sets of colonial-era church bells in NSW, only three are located outside Sydney: at Bathurst, Yass and Maitland. In addition, most of the church bells commissioned in Australia were cast by the competing London firm of Whitechapel's, thus this group of bells is rare as one of few documented sets or individual bells cast by Warner & Sons to be found in Australia.

The place is important in demonstrating the principal characteristics of a class of cultural or natural places/environments in New South Wales.

The Bathurst Cathedral Bells are of State significance as a representative and intact group of large colonial-era church bells.
