= Miss Traill's House =

Historic house in Bathurst, New South Wales, Australia

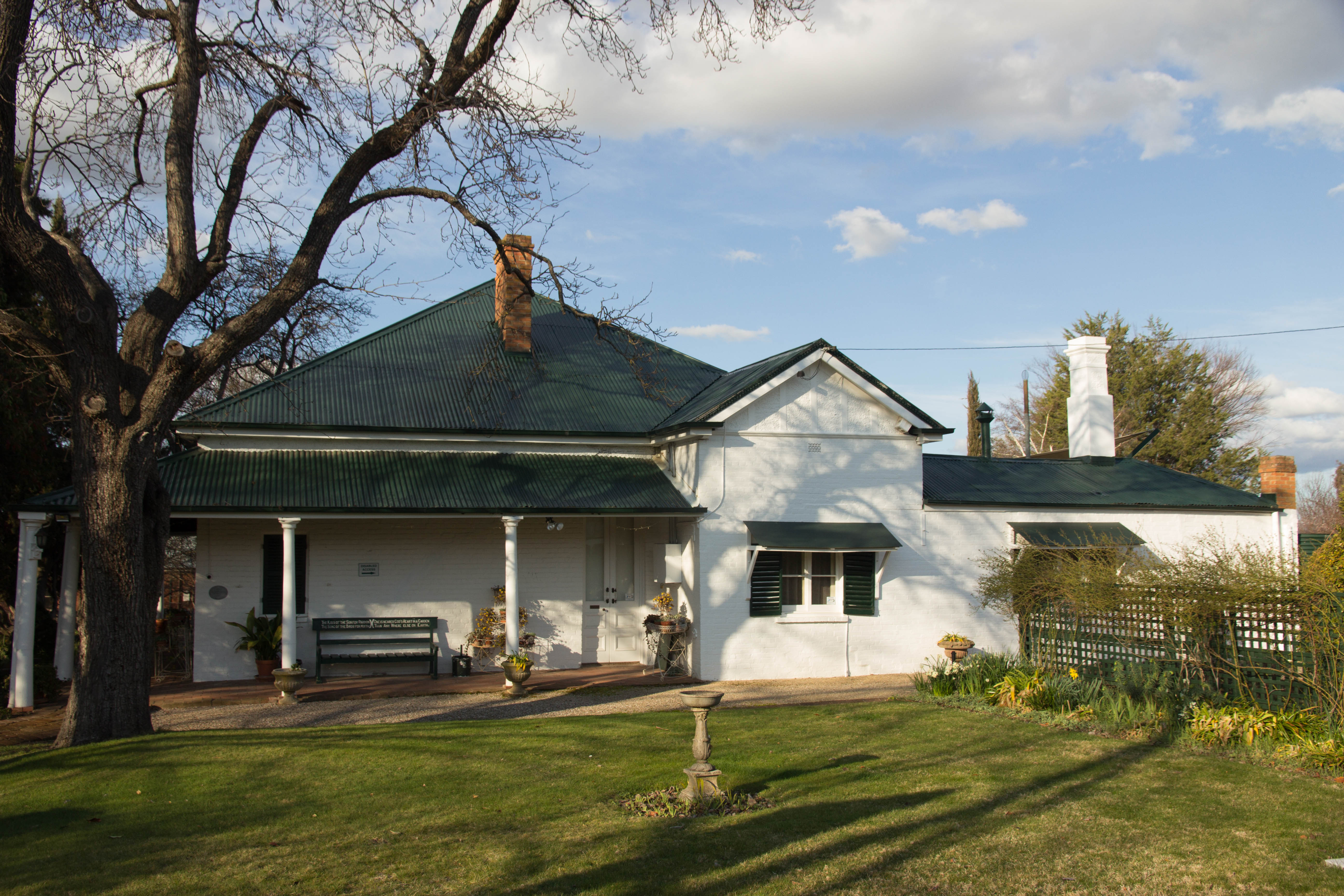
- Miss Traill's House, pictured in 2018.

- Location within New South Wales Location within Australia
- 33°24′44″S 149°34′27″E
- Location: 321 Russell Street, Bathurst, Bathurst Region, New South Wales, Australia

History
- Built: 1845–

Site notes
- Architect: Henry Kitchen
- Owner: National Trust of Australia (NSW)

New South Wales Heritage Register
- Official name: Miss Traill's House; Miss Traills House; All Saints Rectory; Entelly; Wyoming Lodge
- Type: State heritage (built)
- Designated: 1 March 2002
- Reference no.: 1501
- Type: House
- Category: Residential buildings (private)
- Builders: Reverend Thomas Sharpe

Miss Traill's House is a heritage-listed former residence, clergy house and school and now museum at 321 Russell Street, Bathurst, Bathurst Region, New South Wales, Australia. It was designed by Henry Kitchen and built from 1845 by Reverend Thomas Sharpe. It is also known as All Saints Rectory, Entelly and Wyoming Lodge. The property is owned by the National Trust of Australia (NSW). It was added to the New South Wales State Heritage Register on 1 March 2002.

The house is now named after Miss Ida Traill (1889-1976), who lived in the house from 1931 until 1976. Ida Traill was a descendant of early settlers in the region. Her great grandfathers were selected by Governor Macquarie to explore and settle the area. Ida Traill bequeathed the home to the National Trust of Australia. It is now a house museum containing a significant collection relating to Ida Traill's family, including her furniture, horse-racing memorabilia, and artifacts linked to the early history of Bathurst.

== History ==
=== Aboriginal people and colonisation ===
Aboriginal occupation of the Blue Mountains area dates back at least 12,000 years and appears to have intensified some 3000–4000 years ago. In pre-colonial times the area now known as Bathurst was inhabited by Aboriginal people of the Wiradjuri linguistic group. The clan associated with Bathurst occupied on a seasonal basis most of the Macquarie River area. They moved regularly in small groups but preferred the open land and used the waterways for a variety of food. There are numerous river flats where debris from recurrent camps accumulated over a long period. European settlement in this region after the first documented white expedition west of the Blue Mountains in 1813 was tentative because of apprehensions about resistance from Aboriginal people. There was some contact, witnessed by sporadic hostility and by the quantity of surviving artefacts manufactured by the Aborigines from European glass. By 1840 there was widespread dislocation of Aboriginal culture, aggravated after 1850 by the goldrush to the region.

Prior to European settlement in Australia, the Wiradjuri Aboriginal group lived in the upper Macquarie Valley. Bathurst was proclaimed a town by Lachlan Macquarie on 7 May 1815, named after Lord Bathurst, Principal Secretary of State for the Colonies. Bathurst is Australia's oldest inland township.

=== Bathurst ===
Governor Macquarie chose the site of the future town of Bathurst on 7 May 1815 during his tour over the Blue Mountains, on the road already completed by convict labour supervised by William Cox. Macquarie marked out the boundaries near the depot established by surveyor George Evans and reserved a site for a government house and domain. Reluctant to open the rich Bathurst Plains to a large settlement, Macquarie authorised few grants there initially, one of the first being 1000 acres to William Lawson, one of the three European explorers who crossed the mountains in 1813. The road-maker William Cox was another early grantee but later had to move his establishment to Kelso on the non-government side of the Macquarie River.

A modest release of land in February 1818 occurred when ten men were chosen to take up 50 acre farms and 2 acre town allotments across the river from the government buildings. When corruption by government supervisor Richard Lewis and acting Commandant William Cox caused their dismissal, they were replaced by Lieutenant William Lawson who became Commandant of the settlement in 1818.

Macquarie continued to restrict Bathurst settlement and reserved all land on the south side of the Macquarie River for government buildings and stock, a situation that prevailed until 1826. In December 1819 Bathurst had a population of only 120 people in 30 houses, two thirds being in the township of Kelso on the eastern side of the river and the remainder scattered on rural landholdings nearby. The official report in 1820 numbered Bathurst settlers at 114, including only 14 women and 15 children. The government buildings consisted of a brick house for the commandant, brick barracks for the military detachment and houses for the stock keeper, and log houses for the 50 convicts who worked the government farm. Never successful, the government farm was closed by Governor Darling in 1828.

Governor Darling, arriving in Sydney in 1825, promptly commenced a review of colonial administration and subsequently introduced vigorous reforms. On advice from Viscount Goderich, Darling divided colonial expenditure into two parts: one to cover civil administration, funded by New South Wales; the other for the convict system, funded by Britain.

By this time, J. McBrien and Robert Hoddle had surveyed the existing grants in the vicinity. Surveyor James Bym Richards began work on the south side of the river in 1826. But the town was apparently designed by Thomas Mitchell in 1830 and did not open until late 1833 after Richards had completed the layout of the streets with their two-road allotments. The first sales were held in 1831 before the survey was complete.

In 1832 the new Governor, Major General Sir Richard Bourke, visited Bathurst in October. He instructed the Surveyor General Major Thomas L. Mitchell to make arrangements for "opening the town of Bathurst without delay" and he in turn instructed the Assistant Surveyor at Bathurst J. B. Richards to lay out the blocks and streets. This was done in September 1833. It is believed that Major Mitchell named the streets, with George Street being named after King George III.

=== Miss Traill's House ===
On 29 January 1845 the Reverend Thomas Sharpe, the first Rector of All Saints' Cathedral, Bathurst, was granted allotments 1 and 2 in Russell Street Bathurst on which he built his rectory. The construction on Reverend Thomas Sharpe's Colonial Georgian styled house is believed to have begun around this time.

According to photographs and paintings of the house and garden since 1846, the garden was carefully planned and planted soon after the house was built, and was carefully tended over the decades.

After the death of Reverend Thomas and Mrs Sharpe in 1877 their eldest son John inherited the property. John lived there for two periods totaling fourteen years. John let the property to a series of tenants for a period of thirteen years. One of the tenants, Mrs Mary Newton operated the Wyoming Lodge, a school for girls, between 1869 and 1902.

In 1904 the property was sold to William Alfred McLean, a local builder who undertook extensive renovations to the property. McLean's refurbishment gave the house a federation look.

In 1923 William McLean sold the property to Robert Lionel Gilmour, a local glazier. The Gilmours made minor changes to the property.

In 1932 Mrs Gertrude Traill and her daughter Ida rented the house, purchasing it in 1937. Soon after the purchase they modernized the kitchen and bathroom. Later changes were stylistic in character and aimed at giving the house a more colonial look.

Ida Traill was a fourth generation descendant of William Lee and Thomas Kite, both of whom settled in Bathurst in 1818. Lee and Kite were the most successful of Governor Macquarie's ten 1818 settlers. As a result of childhood contact with her grandfather George Lee and his wife Emily (née Kite) who lived at Leeholme, a large homestead close to Bathurst, she became interested in family history. Through inheritance and purchase she acquired a significant collection of artifacts relating to four generations of the Lee family in Bathurst. These items, together with her own furniture, furnishings, paintings and ceramics, were left to the National Trust in 1976 along with the house and grounds.

Miss Traill took a great interest in her garden and built a conservatory in the 1960s to shelter favourite plants from winter cold. Following its acquisition by the National Trust, the garden was described by Sheila Higgins who worked on its early conservation as "a very special and almost unchanged rare garden of the period", and it remains so today. The Trust has been scrupulous in retaining established plantings: two pear trees are documented as being planted in 1852, and it is estimated that the heritage rose "Souvenir de Mme. Leonie Viennot" which blooms today in the courtyard is over 100 years old. The garden's collection of roses includes "Crimson Glory", "Frau Karl Druschki", "Mermaid", "Stanwell Perpetual", "Carabella" and 'Perle d'Or' which was grown from a cutting at Leeholm, the property of Miss Traill's grandparents.

The property is also notable for its paddock, a rare survivor of a feature common to many similar properties in the days when horses, milking cows and other livestock were part of the household. A large area is devoted to woodland, planted with a variety of bulbs, swathes of winter roses or hellebores, dark red tree paeonies, may bush or Spiraea, yellow jasmine and lilac: a mass planting of the succulent Echeveria elegans growing in the shade, a traditional herb garden guarded by an arch of star jasmine, a number of hawthorns and a pink Floridan dogwood tree.

A large part of the property's magic comes from the collection within, much of it linked directly to horses legendary in Australia's equine history. The horses were bred by Miss Traill's grandfather, George Lee, at Leeholme near Bathurst and much of the memorabilia associated with their fairytale successes was inherited by or given to Ida Traill, who displayed it proudly in her own home.

In the hall, studio portraits of George Lee and his wife Emily hang next to a framed photograph of 1899 Melbourne Cup winner Merriwee. Above hangs a watercolour depicting the pedigree of Merriwee and other famous horses bred by Lee, such as Etra-Weenie, Nellie and Sappho. Oil portraits of The Barb, inducted into the Australian Racing Hall of Fame in 2004, and his sister Gulnare, painted by (colonial artist) Joseph Fowles (1810–78), are highly significant in the collection, and once a year, the 18 carat Sydney Cup (1870) won by Barbelle at Randwick Racecourse is displayed under guard at the property. Of all these, The Barb, known as the "Black Demon" reached equestrian stratospheric heights. Twice winner of the Sydney Cup (1868 and 1869), winner of the Melbourne Cup in 1866, The Metropolitan (1868) and the Port Phillip Stakes (1869), The Barb proved time and again that he was the best horse in Australia in his day. As a five year old, he was undefeated in seven strats. In all, he won 15 of his 23 starts.

The Barb was bred by Lee (1834-1912), pastoralist and stud-breeder. Lee inherited land at Kelso and other stations including South Condobolin, later known as Merriwee, when his father died in 1870 and built Leeholme at Kelso in 1872. With descendants of his father's grey mare, Sappho, Lee bred race horses, most of which he leased or sold.

The Black Demon's memory lives on at Miss Traill's House, among memorabilia and artefacts relating to four generations of the Lee family in Bathurst, bequeathed to the National Trust of Australia (NSW) along with the house and grounds, by Miss Ida Traill in 1976(Le Seuer (2015, 6) notes the bequeath date as 1978).

With funding from local and state governments and the Central West Women's Committee (of the National Trust of Australia (NSW)), volunteers carried out considerable maintenance works to structural cracks, re-wallpapered Miss Traill's mother's room (with a wallpaper copied from the original), exterior repainting.

A Museums and Galleries NSW grant in 2015 allowed the Trust to progress storage and display facilities and conservation of Miss Traill's collections.

=== Modifications and dates ===
- 1855 – Addition of room 13.
- 1905 – Tie rods inserted, Internal replastering, external gables constructed, roughcast applied, verandah detailing changed, skirting renewed, external brickwork painted red and pointed, bathroom installed.
- 1923 – Minor changes are made to the house.
- 1940 – Bathroom and kitchen are remodeled.
- 1960s – Miss Traill built a conservatory to shelter favourite plants from winter cold
- 1977 – Repair floor and insertion of vents, new kitchen door.
- 1978 – Repairs to chimney tops, roof gutters, outside toilets, ceiling replaced in bathroom, and plaster repairs to bedroom. New fencing.
- 1979 – Glass cupboards installed in dining room, chimneys of the main house rebuilt in a more Colonial form, bedroom ceiling replaced by gyprock (some).
- 1981 – Herb garden completed, hand basin fitted in lavatory, slow combustion heater installed in pantry.
- 1983 – Gardeners shed and lavatory demolished.
- 1984 – Toilet block constructed, work carried out to dining and drawing rooms.
- 1985 – Repairs to ceiling, plaster and painting in heritage colours.
- 1987 – Shed constructed.
- 1990 – Major stabilisation work including underpinning, repair to kitchen roof, new door and partition between kitchen and pantry, new linoleum, bench tops, sink and taps in the kitchen.
- 1991 – Cloth electric light flex in hall way and dining room replaced by plastic flex.
- 1992 – Cut of barrier and dish drain installed south west side of the house.
- 1993 – Work to kitchen roof. (National Trust of Australia (NSW), 1999)

== Description ==
=== Garden ===
The property sits on a corner block and by current standards appears to be a double block, the house in the half closer to the street corner, and a large garden and service yard area wrapping around it to the north and east.

The garden is designed with a clear hierarchy with the superior rooms at the front of the house facing the garden while the rooms at the back of the house with a lower standard of detail face the service courtyard.

Features of the country styled garden include a courtyard, wishing well, sundial, stone benches, pergola, greenhouse, a drying yard with clothes prop, shed and garage.

Following its acquisition by the National Trust, the garden was described as "a very special and almost unchanged rare garden of the period", and it remains so. The Trust has been scrupulous in retaining established plantings: two pear trees (Pyrus communis cv.) are documented as being planted in 1852 (one is near the house's north-western corner).

The property is also notable for its paddock, a rare survivor of a feature common to many similar properties in the days when horses, milking cows and other livestock were part of the household. A large area is devoted to woodland, planted with a variety of bulbs, swathes of winter roses or hellebores, dark red tree paeonies, may bush or Spiraea, yellow jasmine and lilac: a mass planting of the succulent Echeveria elegans growing in the shade, a traditional herb garden guarded by an arch of star jasmine, a number of hawthorns and a pink Floridan dogwood tree.

The garden has a number of typical 19th century plants and early 20th century garden plantings, including a collection of roses and climbing roses, such as "Tea Rambler" a pink form.

=== Roses ===
It is estimated that the heritage rose "Souvenir de Mme. Leonie Viennot" which blooms today in the courtyard is over 100 years old. The garden's collection of roses includes "Crimson Glory", "Frau Karl Druschki", "Mermaid", "Stanwell Perpetual", "Carabella" and 'Perle d'Or' which was grown from a cutting at Leeholm, the property of Miss Traill's grandparents.

Roses include the following cultivars/hybrids/species: Cecile Brunner; Pinkie; R.laevigata (the Cherokee rose); Dorothy Perkins; Tea Rambler;Claret Cup; R.rugosa "Alba", R.banksiae "Aurea" (Lady Banks' rose) plus a number of modern Tea (Hybrid tea) roses, e.g.: Iceberg, Pacali etc.

=== House ===
A late Colonial Georgian house built of a combination of bricklaying styles. The c. 1845 main house and the c. 1855 Rev. Sharpe's study consisted of English bond (now painted), the kitchen and laundry brickwork is a variation of Flemish bond, while the c. 1905 repairs are a pseudo Flemish bond. Corrugated iron dated c. 1905 covers the original timber shingled roof. The turned verandah columns are original although the brackets to the verandah posts are an 1872 embellishment. The verandah floor is of modern brick. The main house, study and kitchen have very deep chimney stacks. French doors lead to the garden and the house contains four paneled internal doors.

The contents of the house include English and Australian furniture dating from c. 1810, family memorabilia such as photographs, china, racing times, trophies, early Australian items, enameled pottery, ceramics, metalwares (trays, vases, candle sticks), glassware, rugs, books, and notable landscape and portrait paintings.

The property's extensive art collection includes a portrait of Emily Kite by Joseph Backler (1847), two equestrian oils by Joseph Fowles (1810–1878), "Harbour study with barquentine" attributed to the surveyor George Evans (1780–1852), and one of shipping in an Australian harbour by F.L Montague (1869). A second group of fine oil paintings appear to be in the same period as the first group but by European painters. These include two early nineteenth century portraits of children apparently by Tinier, a painting of a "coach hunting party" by W. Williams, and a European landscape by Charles Leslie (1879). The third group of lesser paintings consists of watercolours, Impressionist paintings by Edward Combes (1830–95), post-Impressionist sketches and a large abstract painting by John Power (1881–1943).

Other significant artefacts include; The Sydney Cup won by Barbelle in 1870, Silver cups presented in the 1870s to George Lee for show success with Durham cattle, and an invitation to Mr and Mrs Lee to the 1901 opening of the first Australian Commonwealth Parliament

The physical condition of the house was reported as good as at 3 July 2000.

The integrity of the house has been maintained by preserving the furnishings and property of Miss Traill's. The house and property are being maintained and have been unaltered from the way in which Miss Traill left it.

== Heritage listing ==
From the New South Wales heritage registry: "Built in 1845, Miss Traill's House with its garden and paddock is part of the early history of Bathurst. Its main significance however, was as the home of Miss Ida Traill who lived there from 1932 to 1976. A descendant of two of the region's main pastoralist families, Miss Traill was strongly influenced by her grandfather, George Lee, who bred horses legendary in Australia's equine history. Single, strong-willed but careful, Miss Traill inherited, amassed and cared for a collection which is a valuable insight into the influence and aspirations of the family. The collection is an intrinsic part of her home, where it is presented today; a family treasure unique to the nation."

Miss Traill's House was listed on the New South Wales State Heritage Register on 1 March 2002 having satisfied the following criteria.

The place is important in demonstrating the course, or pattern, of cultural or natural history in New South Wales.

Miss Traill's House has historical significant as it reflects not only the history of the Kites and Lee families but also has great potential to represent the early history of Bathurst and its district viewed through the lens of the lifestyle, interests and possessions of Miss Ida Traill.

Through the association with a range of people including Reverend Thomas Sharpe, William McLean, Mary Newton, Robert Gilmour and the Lee, Kite and Traill families the house, grounds and collections provide evidence of the ways of life in the Bathurst districts.

The place is important in demonstrating aesthetic characteristics and/or a high degree of creative or technical achievement in New South Wales.

The cottage is aesthetically significant using design techniques such as a pyramid shaped roof and the use of the so-called Hambeldon plan, a sophisticated cottage design with a garden and entrance front, introduced into NSW by the architect Henry Kitchen. The house, grounds and collection show unusually accurate evidence of Miss Traill's lifestyle.

The place has potential to yield information that will contribute to an understanding of the cultural or natural history of New South Wales.

Miss Traill's house is technically significant as it is contributing to the historical, social and environmental construction of Bathurst in the mid-eighteenth to nineteenth centuries. The unique architectural design of the house in conjunction with the extensive collection of artifacts relating to the history of one influential family provides a strong foundation in representing the construction of the Bathurst districts.

The place possesses uncommon, rare or endangered aspects of the cultural or natural history of New South Wales.

The collection of rare artworks, trophies, photographs and memorabilia represents the historical, cultural and social construction of the times. Notable artworks include a portrait of Emily Kite by Backler, 1847, and two equestrian oils by Joseph Fowles.

The place is important in demonstrating the principal characteristics of a class of cultural or natural places/environments in New South Wales.

Miss Traill's House displays an accurate representation of class and era through a complete collection of furnishings and memorabilia associated with Kite and Lee families. It is the only substantial house of its period remaining in Bathurst structurally unaltered in any major respect. The garden preserves a typical pattern of geometrically designed flowerbeds.

== See also ==
- Australian residential architectural styles
