= Arnold Wylde =

English-born Anglican bishop in Australia (1880–1958)

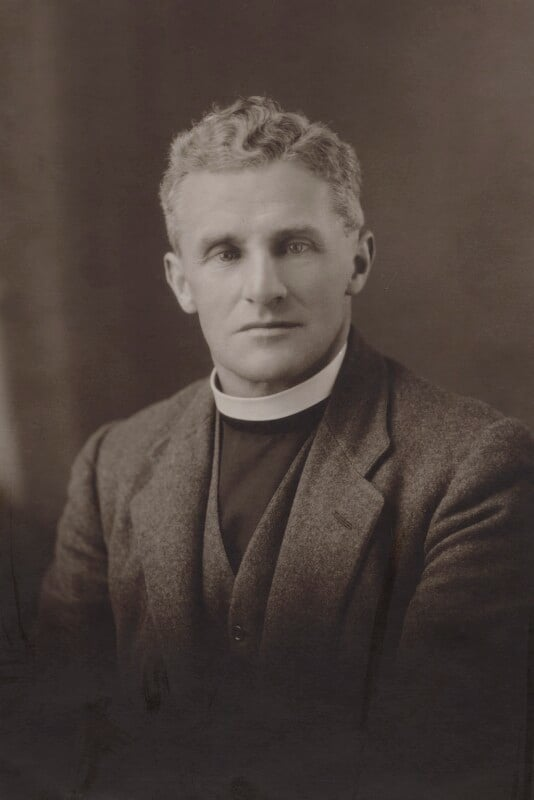
Wylde, c. 1920s

Arnold Lomas Wylde CBE (31 March 1880 – 6 June 1958) was an English-born Anglican bishop in Australia where he was the Anglican Bishop of Bathurst.

== Early life and education ==
Wylde was educated in England at Queen Elizabeth Grammar School, Wakefield, and University College, Oxford. He then spent three years at Oxford House.

== Ordained ministry ==
Wylde trained for ordination at Cuddesdon, and was ordained deacon in 1906 and priest in 1907. His first post was as curate at St Simon Zelotes, Bethnal Green after which he was vicar of the parish until 1921. Emigrating to Australia, he was a member of the Brotherhood of the Good Shepherd, a period he considered the happiest of his ministry. From 1923 until 1928 he was principal of the order.

Appointed a coadjutor bishop of Bathurst in 1927 he was enthroned as diocesan bishop a decade later on 23 February 1937. In 1942 a parish within his diocese led by the Rev T. C. Hammond brought an action against him for introducing The Red Book a perceived heretical text into the diocese's liturgy. He was appointed a CBE in 1957, the year before his death.

Anglican Communion titles
Preceded by Horace Crotty	5th Bishop of Bathurst; 1937 –1958	Succeeded by Ken Leslie
