= George Long (bishop) =

Anglican bishop, brigadier general in the Australian Army

- Born: 5 November 1874; Carisbrook, Victoria
- Died: 9 July 1930 (aged 55); London, England
- Relatives: Gavin Long (son)
- Military career
- Allegiance: Australia
- Branch: Australian Imperial Force
- Service years: 1917–1919
- Rank: Brigadier General
- Conflicts: First World War
- Awards: Commander of the Order of the British Empire

George Merrick Long CBE (5 November 1874 – 9 July 1930) was an Anglican bishop and educationist who served as a brigadier general in the Australian Imperial Force during the First World War. He was also involved in the establishment of Trinity Grammar School in Melbourne, where he became headmaster. He was father of the historian Gavin Long.

== Early life and career ==
George Merrick Long was born in Carisbrook, Victoria, the youngest son of William Long, an Englishman who left for Victoria in the gold rush, and his wife Eliza, née Merrick. He was educated at Maryborough Grammar School, but left early for employment in the bank. He later matriculated by private study and was awarded the Rupertswood theological studentship to Trinity College at the University of Melbourne, from which he graduated with a Bachelor of Arts degree in 1899 and a Master of Arts in 1901.

Long became a deacon on 28 May 1899 and a priest on 10 June 1900. In 1899 he was posted to the district of Foster in Gippsland. He later returned to Melbourne to become senior curate at Holy Trinity Church, Kew. There he became involved with the foundation of Trinity Grammar School, becoming its headmaster in 1904. Long served on several diocesan committees and was made a canon of St Paul's Cathedral, Melbourne in 1910. In May 1911 he was elected bishop of the Anglican Diocese of Bathurst and consecrated on 30 November 1911 at St Andrew's Cathedral in Sydney. For his services, Long was awarded the Lambeth degree of Doctor of Divinity by the Archbishop of Canterbury.

== First World War ==
Long joined the Australian Imperial Force (AIF) on 16 November 1917 as an Anglican chaplain. He sailed for London in January 1918 and was posted to the Australian Reinforcement Camp in France in April 1918. There he was approached by Major General Brudenell White to head the AIF's education project. Long accepted the post of Director of Education, AIF on 10 May 1918 and was promoted to lieutenant colonel on 1 June 1918.

Long established himself in London, and drew up a scheme for professional, general and technical training to be conducted by teaching within the AIF and by sending men out to universities, schools and businesses. Officers with instructional experience were selected and assembled for three weeks training at the University of Cambridge. In three weeks at Cambridge, Kelly produced the books Beef, Mutton and Wool, the first of a series of fifteen texts written by Long's agricultural section.

== Post war ==
When the war ended on 11 November 1918, Long was forced to put the education scheme into full effect earlier than expected. He was promoted to colonel and then temporary brigadier general on 1 January 1919. In March, with the scheme fully underway, Long's health began to suffer, and in April he handed over control to Brigadier General Walter McNicoll. For his services, Long was awarded honorary Doctor of Letters (LLD) degrees by both the University of Cambridge and the University of Manchester, and was appointed a Commander of the Order of the British Empire (CBE) in 1919.

In July 1919, Long returned to his diocese, where he continued his involvement with education. He restarted All Saints College in Bathurst on a new site, and opened the Marsden School for Girls at Kelso. Long was grand chaplain of the United Grand Lodge from 1923 to 1926. He drafted a new constitution for the Church of England in Australia, making it independent of the church in Britain, and advocated the White Australia Policy. Long was elected Bishop of Newcastle in December 1927 and was enthroned on 1 May 1928.

Long went to England in March 1930 to attend the Lambeth Conference in London. There he suffered a cerebral haemorrhage and died on 9 July 1930. His requiem was celebrated by Archbishop Cosmo Lang before 300 bishops and his ashes returned to New South Wales and placed in All Saints Cathedral in Bathurst. He was commemorated in Christ Church Cathedral, Newcastle, where a window of its Tyrrell chapel contains his portrait.

Anglican Communion titles
Preceded by Charles Camidge	3rd Bishop of Bathurst; 1911–1928	Succeeded by Horace Crotty
Preceded by Reginald Stephen	6th Bishop of Newcastle; 1928–1930	Succeeded by De Witt Batty
