= Ian Palmer (bishop) =

The Right Reverend Ian Palmer
- Bishop of Bathurst
- Church: Anglican Church of Australia
- Diocese: Bathurst
- In office: 2013 to 2019
- Predecessor: Richard Hurford
- Successor: Mark Calder

Orders
- Ordination: 1975, deacon; 1976, priest
- Consecration: 9 February 2013 by Peter Jensen

Personal details
- Born: 1950
- Denomination: Anglican
- Spouse: Liz
- Children: 2
- Education: King's College, London (BD); University of Durham (Dip ThL)

Ian Stanley Palmer (born 1950) is an Australian bishop in the Anglican Church of Australia, who served as Bishop of Bathurst from 2013 until 2019.

Palmer was born in the United Kingdom. He studied theology at King's College, London, in 1971 and a post-graduate diploma at Durham University four years later. He was ordained deacon in 1975 and priest in 1976. After ordination, Palmer served in parish ministry at St Michael's Church, Huyton (1975–78) and Collierley (1983-90) and university chaplaincy at the University of Durham (1978–83) prior to moving to Australia to take up a position as Director of Evangelism in the Diocese of Newcastle in 1990.

In 1993, Palmer returned to parish ministry in the Newcastle suburb of Belmont and subsequently at Muswellbrook. Prior to being appointed as bishop, his most recent appointment was at Christ Church, Queanbeyan in the Diocese of Canberra and Goulburn in 2005. During his time in Queanbeyan he also served as Archdeacon of South Canberra and as Archdeacon of Chaplaincies.

Palmer was installed as the 10th Bishop of Bathurst on 9 February 2013.

During his tenure as bishop, the diocese faced significant financial problems, after the Supreme Court of New South Wales found that the diocese was liable to repay a $40 million loan advanced to a diocesan development fund to fund two schools after it defaulted on the loan. Palmer was responsible for selling church property to fund the debts and, even prior to the judgment, Palmer himself had to take up part-time ministry in Dubbo in addition to his role as bishop as there were insufficient funds to pay for his role to fund the case. Palmer suffered a heart attack after ceremonially walking from Bathurst to Dubbo to begin his ministry. Palmer had to sell further property to fund compensation schemes for child sexual abuse victims.

Palmer retired as bishop in April 2019.

Palmer currently conducts a traditional Anglican service at St Wilfrid’s Anglican Church, Mount Duneed. The congregation is a part of the City on a Hill Surf Coast congregation

Palmer is married to Liz, a spiritual director, and has two daughters.
