= Mark Calder =

Australian bishop

The Right Reverend Mark Calder
- Bishop of Bathurst
- Church: Anglican Church of Australia
- Diocese: Bathurst
- Installed: 23 November 2019
- Term ended: 19 September 2026
- Predecessor: Ian Palmer
- Successor: Stephen Carnaby

Orders
- Consecration: 21 November 2019 by Glenn Davies

Personal details
- Born: 1958 or 1959 (age 66–67)
- Denomination: Anglican
- Spouse: Susan
- Children: 3
- Education: Moore Theological College

Mark Norman Calder is an Australian bishop in the Anglican Church of Australia. He was as the Bishop of Bathurst from November 2019 until September 2026.

== Biography ==
Calder was born in Broken Hill but soon moved to Sydney, living in Eastwood where he attended Eastwood Primary School and Epping Boys High School. He worked in the television industry, then studied at Moore Theological College from 1984 to 1987. He worked as an assistant minister in parishes in the Diocese of Sydney at Lalor Park and North Sydney, before becoming rector of St Andrew's Anglican Church, Roseville, a position he held for 18 years.

In November 2009 Calder became rector of Noosa Anglican Church in the Diocese of Brisbane, a role which he held until elected as Bishop of Bathurst in 2019.

Calder was invited by the Diocese of Bathurst to put his name forward as a candidate for bishop and was elected as bishop in September 2019, replacing Ian Palmer.

Calder was consecrated as bishop by Archbishop of Sydney Glenn Davies on 21 November 2019 in St Andrew's Cathedral, Sydney, and installed as bishop on 23 November 2019 in All Saints' Cathedral, Bathurst. Calder has said his goal as bishop is to "share the good news of Jesus across the diocese".

He retired as bishop in September 2026.

Calder has been married to Susan for over 30 years and has three children and six grandchildren.
