= St Andrew's Church, Normanby =

Church in Normanby, North Yorkshire, England

Coordinates: 54.2254°N 0.8744°W

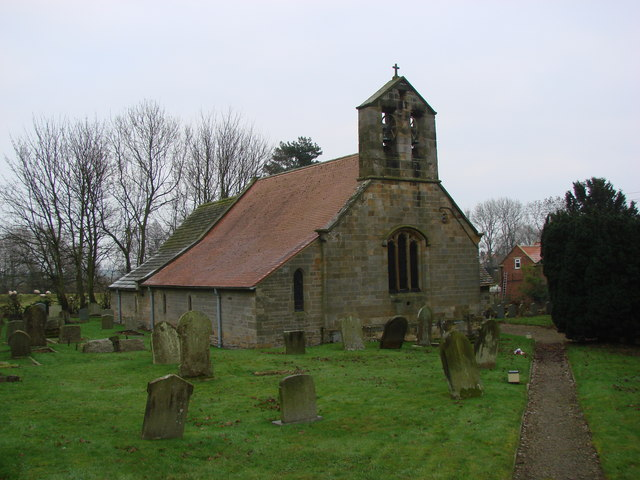
The church, in 2007

St Andrew's Church is the parish church of Normanby, a village near Malton, North Yorkshire, in England.

The church was built in the mid 12th century, from which period the nave arcade and some other fragments survive. The chancel arch dates from about 1300. The remainder of the church was rebuilt in 1718, and then heavily restored by Temple Moore between 1893 and 1895. Moore's work included the addition of a north aisle, partial reconstruction of the chancel and its arch, and addition of a porch. The building was grade II* listed in 1953.

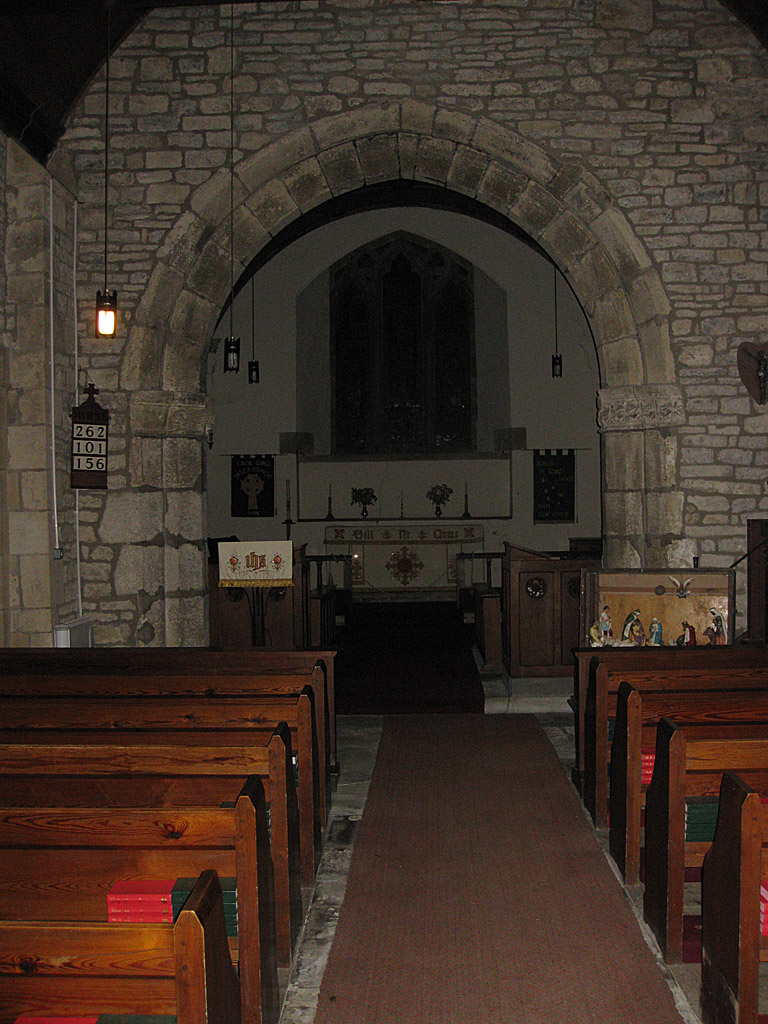
View into the chancel

The church is built of sandstone, the roof of the nave and porch are tiled, and the chancel has a stone slate roof. The church consists of a nave, a north aisle, a south porch, and a chancel with a north vestry. On the west gable is a gabled bellcote with twin arches and a cross. In the porch is a small re-set Norman window, and the doorway contains part of a roll-moulded arch. The 15th-century east window has been reset in the north wall. Inside, there is a piscina with elements from the 12th and 13th centuries, an octagonal 17th-century font, and an alms box which may be 17th century.

== See also ==
- Grade II* listed churches in North Yorkshire (district)
- Listed buildings in Normanby, Ryedale
