= Risborough =

Risborough may refer to:

- Saint-Ludger, Quebec, Canada, part of which was formerly called Risborough
- Princes Risborough, in Buckinghamshire, England
  - Risborough Rangers F.C., a football club based in Princes Risborough
- Monks Risborough, in Buckinghamshire, England

== See also ==
- Riseborough (disambiguation)
