= Samuel Marsden (bishop) =

Australian bishop (1832–1912)

Samuel Edward Marsden (1 February 1832 – 15 October 1912) was an Anglican bishop. He was the first Anglican Bishop of Bathurst.

Marsden was born into a clerical family in Sydney, New South Wales: his grandfather was the Rev. Samuel Marsden, formerly senior chaplain at Parramatta. He came to England as a boy and was educated in private school in Gloucestershire and at Trinity College, Cambridge, graduating BA in 1855. Ordained in 1855, his first positions were curacies within the Diocese of Hereford at St Peter's Church, Hereford from 1855 to 1858, and in Diocese of Lichfield at Lilleshall, Shropshire from 1858 to 1861. From 1861 to 1869 he was Vicar of Bengeworth, Worcestershire, when he was ordained to the episcopate. Widely praised for his "helpful teaching, sympathy and liberal gifts", he resigned his See in 1885 due to ill-health arising from travel in the hot climate within his extensive diocese.

Returning to England, he lived in Clifton, Bristol and was appointed an Assistant Bishop of Gloucester and Bristol in 1892; by 1900 (after the re-erection of the Diocese of Bristol in 1897), he was Assistant Bishop of both dioceses (of Gloucester and of Bristol). After his death in October 1912 aged 80, a memorial was erected to his memory in St. Andrew's Cathedral, Sydney.

Anglican Communion titles
New title	Bishop of Bathurst; 1869 – 1885	Succeeded by Charles Camidge
