= Horace Crotty =

Australian Anglican bishop

Horace Crotty (9 October 1886 – 16 January 1952) was the Anglican Bishop of Bathurst in Australia from 1928 to 1936.

Crotty was educated at Melbourne Grammar School and the University of Melbourne, where he was a resident at Trinity College. Ordained in 1910 while head teacher of All Saints' Grammar School, Melbourne, he was vicar of Ivanhoe, then rector of St Thomas's, North Sydney, before being a wartime chaplain. When peace returned he was appointed Dean of Newcastle where he served until his consecration to the episcopate. On the resignation of his see he was appointed vicar of St Pancras, London. A noted Freemason, in 1943 he retired to Brighton, England, where he died nine years later.

Anglican Communion titles
Preceded by George Long	4th Bishop of Bathurst; 1928–1936	Succeeded by Arnold Wylde
