= Bruce Wilson (bishop) =

Bishop of Bathurst (1942–2021)

Bruce Winston Wilson (23 August 1942 – 20 March 2021) was a bishop of the Anglican Church of Australia. He served as the Anglican Bishop of Bathurst in New South Wales from 1989 to 2000.

Wilson was educated at Canterbury Boys' High School and the University of Sydney. He was ordained in 1966. His first posts were curacies at Darling Point and Beverly Hills, Sydney. After this he was Anglican Chaplain at the University of New South Wales and then Rector of St George's Paddington, Sydney. From 1984 to 1989 he was Director of St Mark's Theological College, Canberra and an Assistant Bishop of Canberra and Goulburn at the time of his consecration as a bishop on 27 October 1984, he was the church's youngest bishop. He was elected Bishop of Bathurst in 1989, retired effective 25 March 2000 and he was married to Zandra Wilson. Wilson died on 20 March 2021 after a long cardiac illness.

While Bishop of Bathurst, Wilson ordained Gloria Shipp the first Aboriginal woman to become a priest in the Anglican Church of Australia.

Anglican Communion titles
| Preceded by Howell Witt | 8th Bishop of Bathurst; 1989–2000 | Succeeded by Richard Hurford |
