= Richard Hurford =

Australian Anglican bishop

Richard Warwick Hurford OAM (born 1944) was the ninth Anglican Bishop of Bathurst, the ordinary of the Diocese of Bathurst in the Anglican Church of Australia.

He was born in Sydney, New South Wales, and was ordained by the Bishop of Grafton in 1969. He served for a short time as a curate at Grafton Cathedral and then went to England to study at Salisbury Theological College and Southampton University on a diocesan scholarship. On finishing his course he was appointed rector of Tisbury, Wiltshire in the Diocese of Salisbury. In 1978 he returned to Australia to be rector of Coffs Harbour in Grafton diocese, after which he served as Dean of Grafton from 1983 to 1997.

He was latterly Rector of St James, King Street, Sydney, before being consecrated as Bishop of Bathurst on 24 March 2001. He retired effective 10 November 2012, having reached the compulsory retirement age of 68.

Anglican Communion titles
Preceded by Bruce Wilson	9th Bishop of Bathurst; 2000 – 2012	Succeeded by Ian Palmer
