= Ken Leslie =

Australian Anglican bishop

Ernest Kenneth Leslie OBE (14 May 1911 in Hitchin – 6 January 2010) was an Australian Anglican bishop. He was the Anglican Bishop of Bathurst from 1959 to 1981.

Leslie was educated at Trinity Grammar School, Kew and the University of Melbourne, where he was a resident of Trinity College. He was ordained deacon in 1934 and priest in 1935 and was a curate at Holy Trinity, Coburg in Melbourne before becoming priest in charge at Tennant Creek in the Northern Territory. He then held incumbencies in Darwin and Alice Springs. He was Vice-Warden of St John's College, Morpeth from 1947 to 1952 and then Chaplain of Geelong Grammar School until his ordination to the episcopate in 1959.

In 1971, he walked the 130 miles from Dubbo to Bathurst to raise money for the construction of a cathedral for his diocese, and he was thereafter known as "The Bishop who walked", which was used as the title for a biography written by his son Simon in 1985 (Bathurst NSW: Robert Brown & Assoc., 1985). He retired in 1981, and was bestowed with an honorary doctorate from Charles Sturt University in 1996.

== Notes ==
Anglican Communion titles
Preceded by Arnold Wylde	6th Bishop of Bathurst; 1959–1981	Succeeded by Howell Witt
