= Anglican Bishop of Bathurst =

Religious position in Australia

Bishop of Bathurst
- Bishopric

anglican
- Coat of arms of the Diocese
- Incumbent; Vacant since 19 September 2026
- Style: The Right Reverend

Location
- Country: Australia
- Ecclesiastical province: New South Wales
- Residence: Bathurst

Information
- First holder: Samuel Marsden
- Denomination: Anglicanism
- Established: 1869
- Diocese: Bathurst
- Cathedral: All Saints' Cathedral, Bathurst

Website
- Diocese of Bathurst

The Bishop of Bathurst is the diocesan bishop of the Anglican Diocese of Bathurst in the Anglican Church of Australia.

== List of bishops ==
Bishops of Bathurst
No	From	Until	Incumbent	Notes
1	1869	1885	Samuel Marsden	Returned to England and served as an honorary assistant bishop in Gloucester.
2	1887	1911	Charles Camidge	Enthroned 3 January 1888; died in office.
3	1911	1928	George Long CBE	Consecrated 30 November 1911; translated to Newcastle.
4	1928	1936	Horace Crotty	Previously Dean of Newcastle; returned to England.
5	1937	1958	Arnold Wylde CBE	Coadjutor bishop since 1927; died in office.
6	1959	1981	Ken Leslie OBE	
7	1981	1989	Howell Witt	Translated from North West Australia.
8	1989	2000	Bruce Wilson	previously Director of St Mark's Theological College, Canberra and Assistant Bishop of Canberra and Goulburn
9	2001	2012	Richard Hurford OAM	Previously Dean of Grafton
10	2013	2019	Ian Palmer	Consecrated and installed on 9 February 2013. Previously Archdeacon of South Canberra
11	2019	2026	Mark Calder	Consecrated 21 November 2019, installed 23 November 2019. Retired 19 September 2026
12	2027 (taking office)		Stephen Carnaby	Elected 23 September 2026. Scheduled to be consecrated 27 November 2026 and installed 16 January 2027
