= Normanby, Ryedale =

Village and civil parish in North Yorkshire, England

Coordinates: 54°13′35″N 0°52′31″W

Normanby
- Location within North Yorkshire
- Population: 156 (2011 census)
- OS grid reference: SE734818
- Unitary authority: North Yorkshire
- Ceremonial county: North Yorkshire
- Region: Yorkshire and the Humber
- Country: England
- Sovereign state: United Kingdom
- Post town: YORK
- Postcode district: YO62
- Police: North Yorkshire
- Fire: North Yorkshire
- Ambulance: Yorkshire
- UK Parliament: Thirsk and Malton

Normanby is a village and civil parish in North Yorkshire, England. It is about 4 miles (6.4 km) west of Pickering. It lies on the main road between Malton and Kirkbymoorside.

In the old days Normanby had 14 alehouses and was a major stopping point due to its location halfway between Teesside and Humberside. These days Normanby has only one pub and a church. All the houses in Normanby are built along the busy main road. The bridge to the south of the village was built in the mid 18th century and is narrow, so in recent years it has been the scene of many accidents. The bridge takes traffic over the River Seven which runs to the east of the village on its way from Rosedale to the River Rye further south.

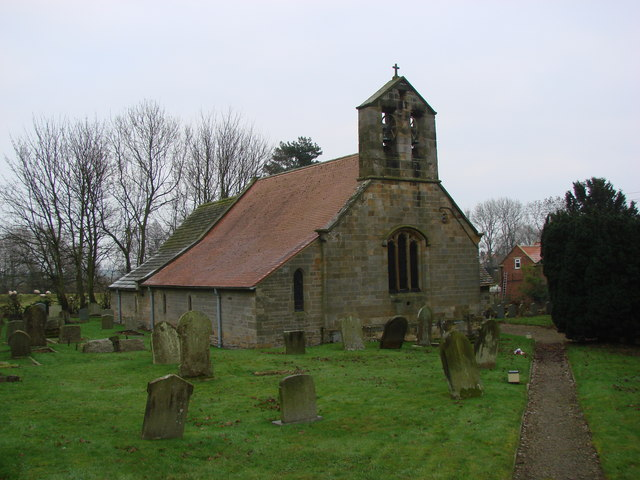
St Andrew's Church, Normanby

== History ==
The manor of Normanby is mentioned in the Domesday Book in 1086. It was granted by the Crown to St. Mary's Abbey, York. At the dissolution of the monasteries, Henry VIII granted the manor to William Romesden of Longley and Richard Vavasour of Ripon. It was later passed to the Meynell family of Hawnby until the estate was split up in the 1680s.

St Andrew's Church, Normanby is a Grade II* listed building; it dates back to the 12th century, with medieval pillars and nave arches surviving. The church was partly rebuilt and restored in the 1890s by Temple Moore. The church bells are 18th and 19th century, one cast by Thomas Mears of the Whitechapel Bell Foundry in 1795, the smaller bell by Warner & Sons in 1895.

The village was part of the Ryedale district between 1974 and 2023. It is now administered by North Yorkshire Council.

== See also ==
- Listed buildings in Normanby, Ryedale
