= Charles Camidge =

Charles Edward Camidge (1838–1911) was the 2nd Anglican Bishop of Bathurst. Born into a clerical family he was educated at St Peter's School, York followed by Wadham College, Oxford. Ordained Deacon in 1860 and Priest a year later his first post was a Sheffield Curacy. Successively the Incumbent at Hedon then Wheldrake he became Rural Dean of Thirsk in 1883. Four years later he was elevated to the Colonial Episcopate and enthroned on 3 January 1888. “A man held in high esteem by clergy and lay people alike” he died in post.

== Notes ==
Anglican Communion titles
Preceded by Samuel Marsden	2nd Bishop of Bathurst; 1887 – 1911	Succeeded by George Long
