= Alf Clint =

Australian Anglican priest and co-operative organizer

William Alfred Clint (8 January 1906 – 21 April 1980) was an Australian priest in the Church of England in Australia (as the Anglican Church of Australia was then called). He established a number of Aboriginal co-operatives on behalf of the Australian Board of Missions, including Tranby Aboriginal College.

== Early life ==
Clint was born in 1906 in Wellington, New Zealand, to John William Clint, a commercial traveller, and his wife Lilian Lancaster (née Cawdery). The family moved to Sydney when Clint was a child, (Note: 1910 according to the Australian Dictionary of Biography; 1914 according to the Cable Clerical Index.) and he was educated at Balmain Public School and Rozelle Junior Technical School, although he left early due to his father's unemployment.

== Career ==
Clint worked for the Balmain Co-operative Society Ltd's store. Despite a Low Church upbringing, Clint was converted to the Anglo-Catholic Christian Socialism of Fr John Hope at Christ Church St Laurence. In 1927 he entered St John's College, Morpeth for training for ordination, becoming a lay reader in the Brotherhood of the Good Shepherd in the Diocese of Bathurst at the same time. He was ordained deacon in 1929, becoming a member of the Brotherhood of the Good Shepherd, but retained, on his insistence, both his membership of the Australian Labor Party and the Australian Workers' Union. As a member of the Brotherhood he was known as Brother Alf, and served in Tottenham. He was ordained priest in 1932, remaining a member of the Brotherhood until 1935.

Clint was then rector of St Mary's, Weston, New South Wales (1935–1941) and St Stephen's, Portland, New South Wales (1941–1948). Both Weston and Portland were mining towns, and Clint had the miners at church on Sunday mornings and at Lenin meetings on Sunday evenings. In 1938 he was granted leave from his parish, and he worked his passage from Australia to England as a pantry boy in order to attend the Labour Party fete at Thaxted in Essex, hosted by the "Red Vicar" of Thaxted, the Revd Conrad Noel.

In 1948, he was invited by the Rt Revd Philip Strong, Bishop of New Guinea, to become co-operative adviser at Gona, Papua. He walked from village to village organising Christian co-operatives. In 1951, suffering from severe dermatitis (which "caused his skin to peel off like a mango"), he was advised against returning to the tropics and became rector of St Barnabas', South Bathurst.

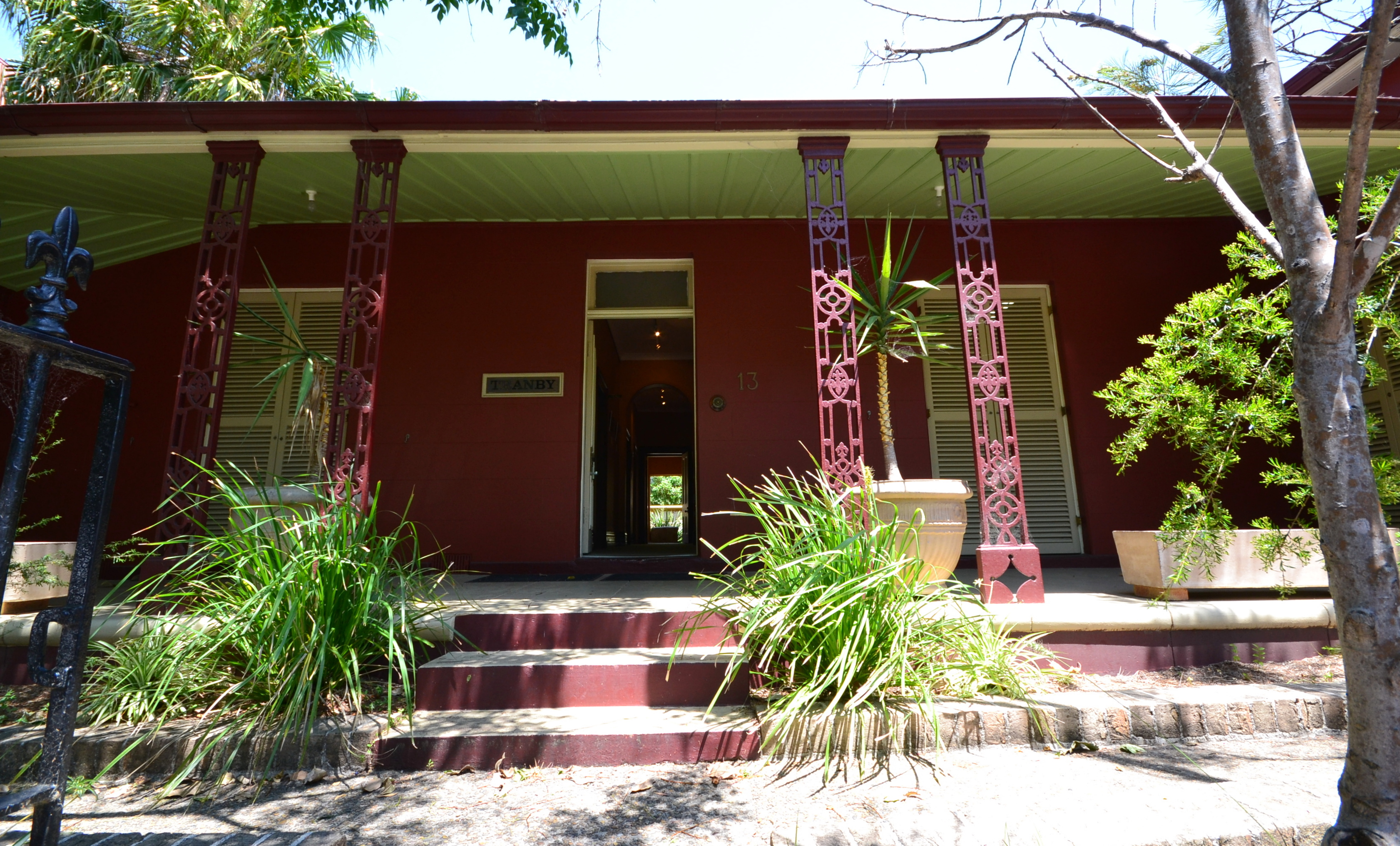
Tranby

In 1953, he was appointed director of co-operatives at the Australian Board of Missions. At the time, ABM still had a number of Aboriginal missions, and Clint travelled around them, establishing co-operatives at Lockhart River Mission (1954), Moa Island, Torres Strait (1956), and Cabbage Tree Island (1959). In 1957 Fr Hope gave Clint a house, Tranby, for his work with Aborigines. Now (2021) called Tranby National Indigenous Adult Education and Training, Tranby is still run by the Co-operative for Aborigines Limited, founded by Clint.

By 1959, the Lockhart River co-operative was bankrupt due to the collapse of the trochus shell market. In 1960 the Rt Rev John Matthews was elected Bishop of Carpentaria; he considered Clint to be a destabilizing influence and, in 1961, banned him from entry to Anglican missions in the diocese. That led the ABM in 1962 to replace its co-operative department with an autonomous body, Co-operative for Aborigines Ltd, of which Clint was the general secretary. Clint was still general secretary when he died: the morning of his death he called the staff to his bedside, and urged them to continue their work.

== Personal life ==
Clint was unmarried. He died in 1980; his requiem mass at Christ Church St Laurence was attended by 500 people. He was cremated at Northern Suburbs crematorium.

== Legacy ==
Clint was the subject of an appreciative biography by his friend, the novelist Kylie Tennant, Speak You So Gently (1959). Unusually for a Christian cleric, he was the subject of a sympathetic obituary in the Communist Party of Australia's newspaper, Tribune. A memorial sanctuary bell was installed at St Barnabas', South Bathurst, although the church was subsequently destroyed by fire in 2014. The boardroom at Tranby is named after Clint.
