= Australian Union of Students =

- Abbreviation: AUS
- Predecessor: National Union of Australian University Students
- Successor: National Union of Students
- Formation: 1937 (as NUAUS); December 1970 (as AUS)
- Dissolved: 1984
- Website: natstudaustralia.org

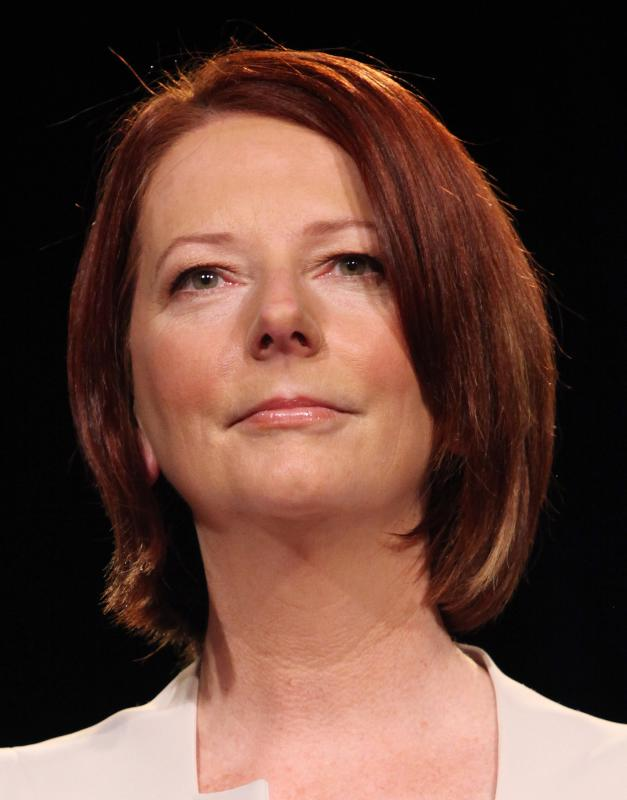
Julia Gillard, the second-last president of AUS

The Australian Union of Students (AUS), formerly National Union of Australian University Students (NUAUS), was a representative body and lobby group for Australian university and college of advanced education students. It collapsed in 1984 and was succeeded by the National Union of Students in 1987.

== NUAUS ==
The NUAUS formed in 1937 as a representative body for Australian university students.

An early president (1940) of the NUAUS was Frank Coaldrake, who was also the founding editor of the pacifist newspaper The Peacemaker, the Chairman of the Australian Board of Missions and, just before his death, the Archbishop-elect of Brisbane.

John Bannon, who would later be elected the 39th Premier of South Australia, was President of NUAUS in 1968.

== AUS ==
The Australian Union of Students (AUS) was established in December 1970 as a successor to the NUAUS, changing its name to reflect the addition of colleges of advanced education to the tertiary education system in Australia.

The Black Community School in Townsville, established in 1973, received financial support from the AUS until at least 1981. The school eventually closed in 1985.

The 28th Prime Minister of Australia, Tony Abbott, was a member of the AUS in 1977.

American laser physicist and author Frank Duarte was a Macquarie delegate to AUS in 1980.

Julia Gillard, later the 27th Prime Minister of Australia, was elected President of the Australian Union of Students in 1983.

In late 1984, a special National Conference of AUS, chaired by the union's Western Australian state organiser, wound up the union. The ostensible reason for its dissolution was lack of access to funding from previously affiliated university campuses, which disaffiliated as a result of a coordinated campaign by a coalition of right-wing students aligned with either the Australian Liberal Party or the right-wing factions of the Australian Labor Party. This campaign culminated in a series of student referendums held at major campuses around Australia in 1983.

However, there were more important strategic internal political dynamics at play. The disaffiliation of many large, moderate campuses in the years leading up to and including 1983 meant that the radical left faction was poised to take control of the Union at its next Annual Conference. The more moderate left faction, loosely aligned with the left faction of the Australian Labor Party, was determined to prevent this by any means possible, believing the Union was becoming increasingly marginalised and was in a death spiral towards terminal irrelevance.

In 1987 the National Union of Students was established as a successor organisation.

=== Black Resource Centre ===
The Black Resource Centre (BRC), established in Melbourne by Cheryl Buchanan in 1975, was supported by the AUS. The BRC produced two publications: Black News Service and Black Liberation. Black News Service was published from April 1975 (vol.1, no.1) and c. 1977; Black Liberation was published between November 1975 (no.1) and July 1977 (Vol. 2, no. 3). Buchanan had a large network of contacts, and the newspapers could be distributed to many people and organisations around Australia. These included trade unions, women's groups, gay liberation groups, Friends of the Earth Australia and Greenpeace Australia. Black News Service carried an article about activist and later poet, Lionel Fogarty, then aged 17, in its seventh issue in 1975.

At first the students' union controlled the finances and all BRC activities had to be approved by them, but in 1976 Buchanan negotiated a A$27,000 grant from them that was administered directly by the BRC. The BRC moved to Brisbane, where Buchanan's family lived. Buchanan was a member of the Black Power movement and was quite militant in her approach, and like many other Aboriginal activists, was watched by ASIO. In 1977, the University of Melbourne's National Liberal Student Association took the AUS to court, claiming they were spending student fees wrongfully, contravening the union's constitution. Along with other organisations, BRC was listed as receiving funds illegally, and their funding was withdrawn as a result. BRC and its publications became dependent on donations from readers and other organisations, leading to its demise.

== Festivals ==
NUAUS and then AUS organised four alternative festivals, between 1967 and 1973, called the Australian Universities Arts Festival and Aquarius Festival, the latter being a starting point for a new development era of Byron Bay area.

== Records ==
The archives of the Australian Union Of Students are held at the National Library of Australia.

== Sources ==
- Jackson, Malcolm (22 July 1980). "A.U.S." Woroni (a student publication at Australian National University). Canberra. p. 3.
- Turnbull, Paul; Bischoff, Eva; Rodoreda, Geoff (2021). Mabo's Cultural Legacy. History, Literature, Film and Cultural Practice in Contemporary Australia. London: Anthem Press.
- Weimar, Barbara (11 February 1981). "Where is AUS Going?". Tribune. Canberra. p. 12.
