= Coaldrake =

Coaldrake is a surname. Notable people with the surname include:

- Frank Coaldrake (1912–1970), Australian priest
- Peter Coaldrake (born 1951), Australian academic and higher education administrator
