= The Peacemaker (newspaper) =

Former pacifist newspaper in Australia

The Peacemaker was a pacifist newspaper based in Melbourne, Australia. It was published from 1939 to 1971.

== History ==
In 1939 Frank Coaldrake (1912–70) was a community worker with the Brotherhood of St Laurence in the inner-Melbourne suburb of Fitzroy. In 1938-39 he had been the travelling secretary of the Australian Student Christian Movement, and during this time he had become a convinced pacifist. Three weeks after the declaration of war in 1939, he founded The Peacemaker, a monthly paper to inform and assist those who conscientiously objected to military service. Although The Peacemaker was notionally a monthly publication, the actual publication history was more erratic than that suggests.

Coaldrake was president of the Federal Pacifist Council of Australia from 1943 to 1946. He offered to serve as a missionary in Japan, initially in 1943 at the height of the war to Dr H. V. Evatt, the Minister for External Affairs and which was declined, but which was accepted by Bishop George Cranswick, Chairman of the Australian Board of Missions in 1946. He left Melbourne at the end of 1946 to spend 15 months studying Japanese at the University of Sydney. At this point the Federal Pacifist Council (which was the Australian section of War Resisters' International) took over responsibility for publication of The Peacemaker.

During this time The Peacemaker was a strong campaigner for those who objected to performing national service. The last issue featured a cover photo of the anti-war activist and conscientious objector Michael Matteson whilst on the run from police.

The Peacemaker ceased publication in 1971.

== Editors ==
- The Rev Frank Coaldrake, 1939–46.
- GA (Tony) Bishop, 1946–53.
- Vivienne Abraham, 1953–55.
- WJ Latona, 1955–57.
- The Rev Dr Ernest Edgar Vyvyan Collocott, 1957–60.
- An editorial committee convened by A Hodge, 1960–63.
- Vivienne Abraham and Shirley Abraham, 1964–68.
- Vivienne Abraham, 1968–71.
