= North Sydney Technical High School =

Former school in Australia

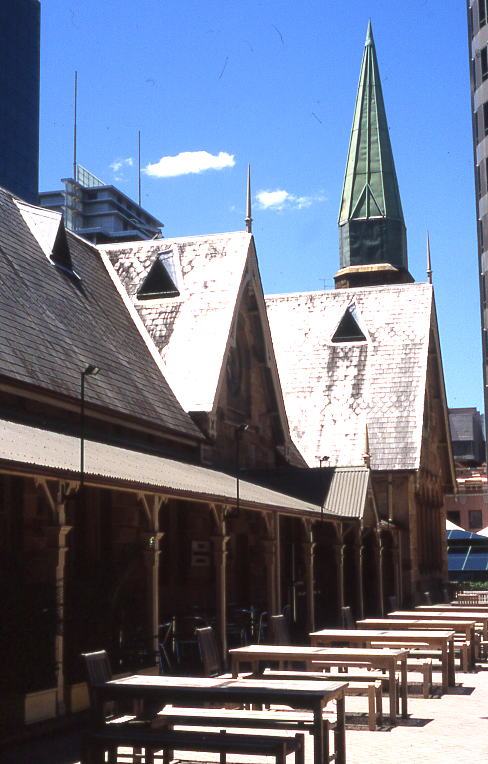
- Former North Sydney Technical High School building (now Greenwood Hotel)

- Location within inner Sydney
- 33°50′25″S 151°12′27″E
- Location: 36 Blue Street, North Sydney, New South Wales, Australia

History
- Built: 1876–1877

Site notes
- Architects: George Allen Mansfield (original); William E. Kemp (1891 extension to north); Walter Liberty Vernon (1900, 1902 addition)

New South Wales Heritage Register
- Official name: North Sydney Technical High School (former); St Peters Presbyterian School; St. Leonard's Public School; St. Leonard's Superior Public Boys' School; Greenwood Plaza; North Sydney Technical School
- Type: State heritage (complex / group)
- Designated: 2 April 1999
- Reference no.: 517
- Type: School – State (public)
- Category: Education
- Builders: W Jago

North Sydney Technical High School is a heritage-listed former public school, Presbyterian school and education resource centre and now pub at 36 Blue Street, North Sydney, New South Wales, Australia. It was designed by George Allen Mansfield (original), William E. Kemp (1891 extension to north), Walter Liberty Vernon (1900 and 1902 addit and built from 1876 to 1877 by W Jago. It is also known as North Sydney Technical High School (former), St Peters Presbyterian School, St. Leonard's Public School, St. Leonard's Superior Public Boys' School, Greenwood Plaza and North Sydney Technical School. The property is privately owned. It was added to the New South Wales State Heritage Register on 2 April 1999.

Over the years, the school has been progressively upgraded as St Leonards Public School, St Leonards Superior Public School, North Sydney Superior Public School, North Sydney Primary School, North Sydney Intermediate High School, North Sydney–Chatswood Junior High, and, finally, as North Sydney Technical High School until its closure in 1969.

== History ==
Prior to British colonisation in 1788, the eastern part of the north shore of Port Jackson (i.e. Terrey Hills, Duffys Forest, Narrabeen, Dee Why, Curl Curl, Freshwater, Manly, Middle Cove, Lane Cove, North Sydney and Chatswood) was originally inhabited by the Gai-mariagal people. Six major family groups comprised the overall Gai-mariagal clan- the main three being Galmai, the Gatlay and the Gammeray. The land on which the former North Sydney Technical High School stands was occupied by the Gammeray people, recently referred to as Cammeraygal or Cammeraigal. First Fleet officer Collins noted that the Gammeray people were 'a stronger and more virile' people than others living around the harbour as they were larger and more numerous. Collins also noted that it was the role of the Gammeray during initiation rites to remove the right front tooth of young men from neighbouring groups, a privilege believed now to be a reciprocal obligation with other groups who had ceremonial obligations with the Gammeray people.

In April 1789, almost half of Sydney's Indigenous population died of smallpox. In 1790 Governor Phillip noted '...it is seldom that any of them are now seen near the settlement.' Survivors of the smallpox epidemic regrouped in areas such as Broken Bay, Kissing Point (Ryde), Woolloomooloo, La Perouse and Botany Bay. This regrouping of ancient clans and families involved social re-organisation and possible merging of dialects and culture. By 1830, records show that, apart from a group camping in the government boatsheds west of Circular Quay, few people identified as Aboriginal were living in Sydney.

=== School site ===
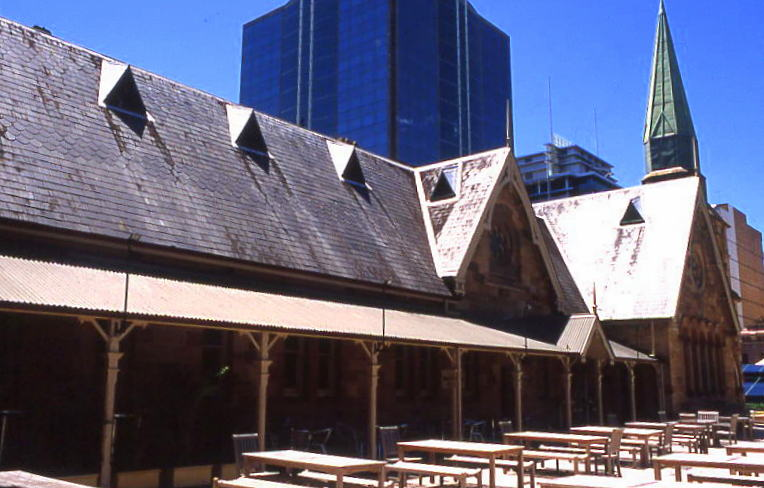
Former technical college, now Greenwood Hotel, North Sydney, November 2007.

The school was originally St Peters Presbyterian School, located on Blues Point Road and part of the Presbyterian Church. But, after talks in May 1874, ownership was transferred to the Council of Education as a state school. St Leonards' population was rapidly increasing at this time and the Council of Education recognised the need to establish a new school. So, in November 1875, the council purchased 1 to 1/4 acres of land from Mrs. Isabella Atcheson for A£1,800. The land was seen as very desirable due to its central location, sufficient space for playgrounds, and its "fine views of the harbour".

After a year of discussion, plans for the new school were drawn by George Allan Mansfield, a leading architect at the time, who had built many school buildings throughout Sydney in the 1870s and early 1880s. The plans included construction of a new Gothic Revival stone building to accommodate at least 100 children, an adjoining small religious room, and the erection of a new teachers' residence with detached kitchen. The building was contracted to W. Jago for a period of ten months and was accepted by council in February 1876. The school building was built of locally quarried Hawkesbury sandstone with dressed ashlar surround to all openings. The gabled roof featured ornamental bands of hexagonal shaped slates, carved finials, and detailed barge boards. The final cost of the school was £4,700, reflecting the building's elaborate stone detailing and its importance to the community. In March 1877, St Leonard's Public School opened with 320 boys, girls and infants. The building boasted a finely detailed bell tower, which was one of the earliest and most prominent landmarks of the lower North Shore visible from the city.

The first addition to the school was in 1882. As attendance had grown to 365, separate girls' and infants' departments were considered necessary. In 1883 the natural rocky grounds were asphalted. In 1884 Nimrod Greenwood was appointed headmaster and two years later the school was renamed St Leonard's Superior State Public School. In 1890 the school was connected with gas, classrooms were completed for £896, and technical classes commenced in shorthand, bookkeeping, drawing and building construction. In 1891 more land was resumed and the following year a new building was erected to enable an extra 180 pupils to be enrolled. This addition extended the main body of the building, creating a northern court and complementing the massing as a whole. The resultant plan was broadly an "H" shape. The addition was designed by schools' architect William Kemp and detailing was of consistently high standard throughout, with fine stone carving, detailed gable ends, and moulded timber columns and valence boards on the verandahs. By September 1892 there were a total of 820 pupils.

In 1893 the Girls' Department was moved to the Presbyterian School to make more room for infants' classrooms. To improve natural lighting in these rooms, windows were cut into the walls and glass partitions were installed. In addition to these changes, new fencing was erected, all wood and ironwork was repainted, and the flagging on the south side beneath the verandah was replaced with new stone. The new buildings were officially opened in April that year by P. Cullen, the chairman of St Leonard's District school board, and the school was renamed St Leonard's Superior Public Boys' School.

In 1898 another new building was necessary to house 100 more boys. Additional land in Miller Street was purchased in 1900: two years later, a girls' block was built, costing £3,300 and enabling the number of girls enrolled to be increased to 450. In 1908 the government architect W. L. Vernon was contracted to make some alterations to the school:

- Three new doors in the west wall upstairs
- Two new doors to a wall downstairs
- Original front door built up
- All fireplaces bricked up except the southern fireplace
- Fireplace removed in original wing and replaced with two windows
- All verandahs to the north enclosed to form a corridor, hat room and teachers' room
- New folding partitions throughout the building
- Existing glass replaced with clear glass
- Removal of front verandah (south side) to enable more natural lighting into classrooms . Erection of an additional outside staircase.

The following variations were made by John Brown in March 1911:

- Concrete lintels instead of arches to carry joists
- Lighter construction for uniformity
- Breaking openings in old cavity to ensure exclusion of damp
- Channelling old walls with two courses to support concrete floors.

The school was renamed North Sydney Public School in 1910, but it continued to be known unofficially as Greenwood's School after the very popular headmaster. In 1912, seventy two boys and seventy five girls enrolled as intermediate high school students, secondary classes commenced and North Sydney Intermediate High School was formed. The following year, additions were made to the Miller Street building enabling North Sydney Junior Technical High School to function there as a demonstration- and commercial school. In 1914 much respected headmaster, Nimrod Greenwood, retired after 30 years' service to the children of the district.

Shortly after Greenwood's retirement, the girls were transferred to the new North Sydney Girls' High School and in 1915 the senior boys were transferred to North Sydney Boys' High School. In 1920 the school was renamed North Sydney Boys' Intermediate High School.

In 1936 with an enrolment of 703 pupils, the school was renamed North Sydney and Chatswood Junior High School. From 1943 the school was called North Sydney Technical High school and was home to another respected Headmaster, John Ireland (1948 - 1954). In 1969 the school was closed and then used as an Educational Resources Centre.

=== Site sale and redevelopment ===
During the 1970s, the school was neglected by the NSW Education Department and was regularly attacked by vandals. In March 1978 the school was listed on the Register of the National Estate. In 1980 Lendlease won a tender to lease the site, but failed to win approval from planning authorities to build a $100 million complex.

The fate of the school was unsure, until February 1987 when the Government of New South Wales announced the sale of the school and surrounding land. The government consulted North Sydney Council and outlined that any development conform to the following restrictions:

- the original sandstone school building be retained;
- 60% of the site be kept as open space for a public plaza and setting for the school;
- three mature Moreton Bay fig trees be retained;
- provision for a pedestrian link to North Sydney railway station and across the Pacific Highway; and
- commercial office space limited to a floor space ratio of 3.5:1.

The Old Lions (the school's old boys' union), the North Shore Historical Society and North Sydney Council disputed the sale as they were concerned about the welfare of the former school. In June 1987 the Heritage Minister Bob Carr responded to their outcry by listing the school and surrounding property on the NSW Heritage Act- Permanent Conservation Order, thus insuring the original school building and the three old Moreton Bay fig trees (Ficus macrophylla) would be conserved.

The sale was managed by Raine & Horne, North Sydney and tenders closed on 11 May 1987. A total of fourteen companies provided tenders, and prices started from $33 million. The 1.08-hectare (2.7-acre) site was bought by Euro-National Properties and Industrial Equity for $47.1 million. The winning proposal boasted a new 36-level landmark tower with red brown granite and bronze glass facade and a polished granite lobby. The $400 million landmark complex would provide 40,000 square metres (430,000 sq ft) of commercial office space and 8,000 square metres (86,000 sq ft) of retail space, include a day-care centre and parking for 497 cars. The scheme was designed by DGH International with interior design by the Australian designers Rice Daubney. Developer John Tierney and his partners Maurice and Tony Green (of The Green Hotel Corporation) were in charge of the restoration and conversion of the former school into a boutique pub/restaurant. Construction started in 1989 by Metroplaza Construction.

The most challenging aspect of the development was the excavation of 145,000 square metres (1,560,000 sq ft) of sandstone around the footing of the former school building. This involved propping the school up whilst burrowing underneath and reinforcing its foundations without damaging the structure. Wind tunnel tests were also carried out to assess any wind risks from the tower block and as a result all the school's old chimneys were reinforced with steel rods. The construction of the shopping plaza below ground level enabled direct access to adjacent areas such as North Sydney railway station, and Miller Street and the Pacific Highway (both having a lower ground level than the school).

In November 1991 the project ran into financial difficulties and Industrial Equity liquidated its $500 million investment into the plaza and changed the contractor to Multiplex. In June 1992 Optus agreed to lease the tower and paid for naming and signage rights to the building, giving it a dominant position in the North Sydney skyline. The change in building contractors paid off and the plaza was completed ahead of schedule in October 1992. Mirvac bought the site in 1994.

The Kemp-designed two storey brick school buildings facing Miller Street were demolished as part of the tower redevelopment. A 1980 photo shows this building still facing Miller Street. The original school building was adapted for use as a hotel c. 1991. In 1997 approvals were given to construct a childcare centre at the base of the adjacent Optus tower.

In 2017 the leasehold for the Greenwood Hotel was sold by Mirvac.

== History ==
Developing from probably the first school on the colony's northern shore, the origins of the school started in 1844 in a two-room weather-board cottage (no longer in existence) on Blues Point Road close to Lavender Street, then to a small stone school house at 12 Miller Street. A new school-house was built during 1877 in the Gothic Revival style at Blue Street, North Sydney by the New South Wales Council for Education. Officially opened in 1878, it offered education for boys and girls from Infants to Primary. Extensions were added over time, with the second story class-rooms completed in 1893.

Often referred to colloquially as “Greeny’s” for Nimrod Greenwood, its longest-serving head-master (1884-1914), the school grew, spawned others, was modified and shaped; its curriculum specialities and name, changing to reflect the needs of an expanding north shore community; its educational philosophy inspiring achievement over generations.

- 1874: St Leonards Public School
- 1886: St Leonards Superior Public School
- 1910: North Sydney Superior Public School
- 1912: North Sydney Intermediate High School.
- 1914: "Intermediate" graduate girls seeking further study transferred to the new North Sydney Girls High School on Lane Cove Road (now Pacific Highway).
- 1915: "Intermediate" graduate boys seeking Leaving Certificate qualifications enrolled at the newly opened North Sydney Boys High School at Falcon Street.
- 1931: "Infant and Primary" students were transferred en bloc to the new North Sydney Demonstration School on the Lady Hay Estate, at the corner of Pacific Highway and Bay Road.
- 1934: Due to the demolition of school buildings to make way for the Harbour Bridge access road cutting, staff and "Household Arts" girls were transferred to be the initial student population of the new Willoughby Home Science School at Mowbray Road.
- 1936: North Sydney & Chatswood Boys Junior High school
- 1942: North Sydney Technical High School

At its closure in 1969, due to the increasing commercial density of the North Sydney CBD, it was one of only two selective boys high schools on the north shore. The few remaining pupils were transferred to North Sydney Boys High School. The School Principal and many of the teaching staff transferred to Killara High School, which opened the following year. The substantial library was also transferred to Killara High School. The Old Lions, together with the North Shore Historical Society, lobbied to have the building saved, restored and now heritage-listed for all to enjoy. The restored stone building on the school site is now leased to the Greenwood Hotel.

== Description ==
=== Curtilage boundary ===
South: One of the Moreton Bay fig trees (Ficus macrophylla) forming part of the curtilage dominates the Blue Street front of the curtilage, screens the school building from the street. Bus stop shelters further separate the school from Blue Street. The Pacific Highway frontage of the site comprises a two-storey facade of Greenwood Plaza (which can be accessed directly from the Pacific Highway), with the school behind on a higher level. The northern skylight of the plaza below is at this upper ground level of the school.

West: along the edge of the former school, facing Gas Lane the curtilage is about 4 metres into this laneway space. On the eastern side of the former school, the curtilage is about 4m east of the school's facade. On the northern side of the former school, the northern skylight structure of the Greenwood Plaza below is entirely within the SHR curtilage.

=== Modifications and dates ===
- 1882: addition - separate girls and infants' departments
- 1890 gas connected, classrooms completed
- 1891 more land resumed
- 1892 new building built for extra 180 pupils, extending main building, creating a northern court in "H" shape
- 1893 Girls' Dept. moved to Presbyterian School to make room for more infant classrooms. Windows were cut in these walls and glass partitions installed. New fencing was built, flagging on south side replaced with new stone.
- 1898 new building to house 100 more boys built
- 1900 and 1902 - girls' block built.
- 1908 Vernon-designed alterations including new doors in W wall upstairs, downstairs, blocking up front door, bricking up fireplaces except southern one, removing fireplace in original wing, replacing with 2 windows; enclosing all verandahs to north into corridor, hat room, teacher's room; new folding partitions throughout, replacing glass, removing S side front verandah, additional outside staircase (WL Vernon)
- 1911 variations (J.Brown): concrete lintels instead of arches to carry joists; lighter construction, breaking openings in old cavity to ensure exclusion of damp, channelling old walls with two courses to support concrete floors.
- 1913 additions to Miller St. building for High School to function as demonstration and commercial school.
- 1914 girls transferred to new Nth.Sydney Girls' High School
- 1915 boys transferred to North Sydney Boys' High School
- 1969 school closed and used as an educational resources centre.
- 1970s vandalism
- 1989 construction started of retail/commercial complex, with 36 level tower (office/retail), day care centre and parking for 497 cars, including excavating 145000 sq.m. of sandstone around footing of former school building, "propping up" the school while burrowing underneath and reinforcing its foundations without damaging the structure. Chimneys were steel-rod-reinforced after wind tunnel tests. Shopping plaza built below ground level allowing direct access to adjacent areas such as North Sydney railway station, Miller Street. and the Pacific Highway (on a lower ground level than the school).
- 1992 Plaza completed.
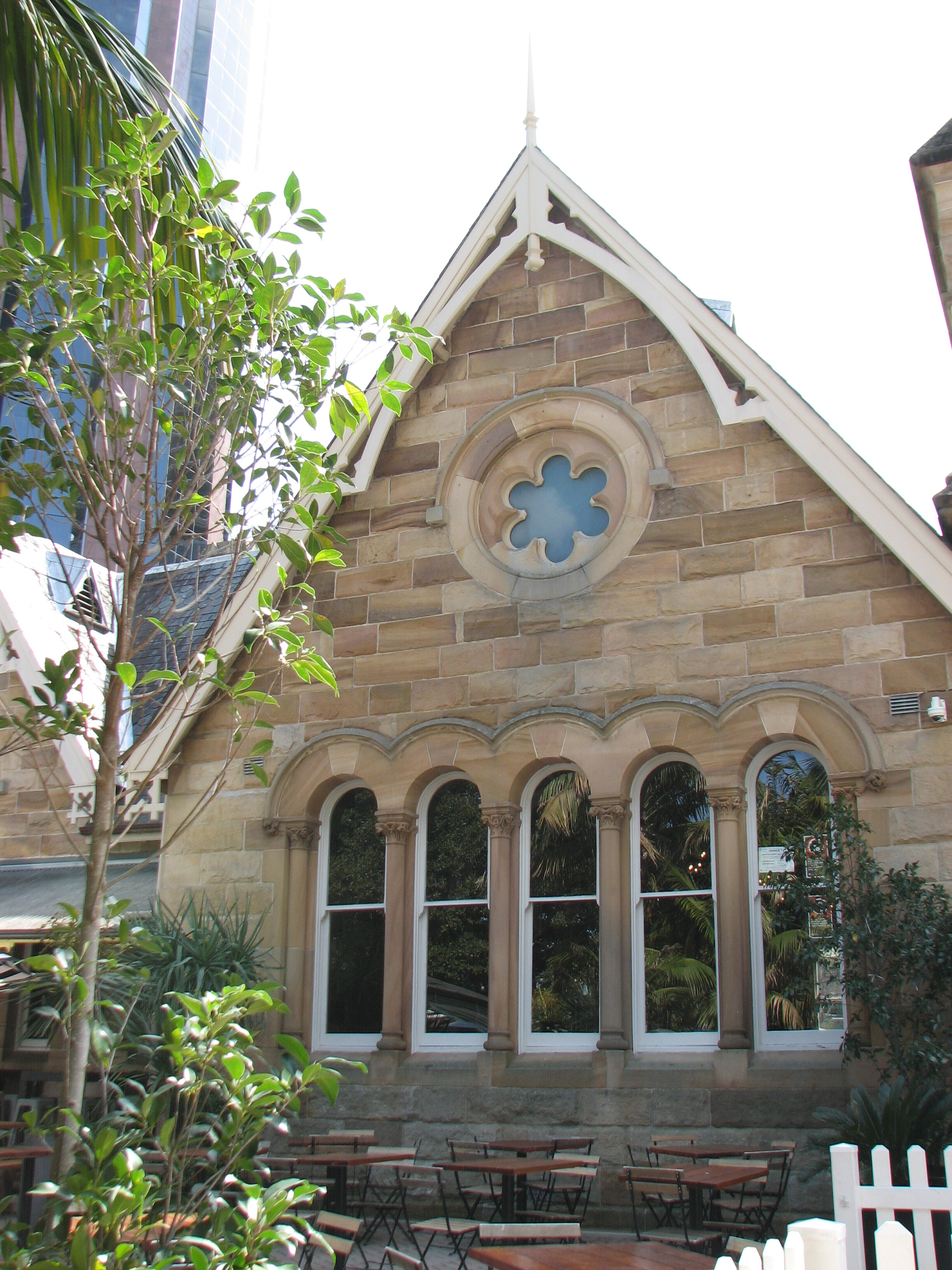
Greenwood Hotel in 2018

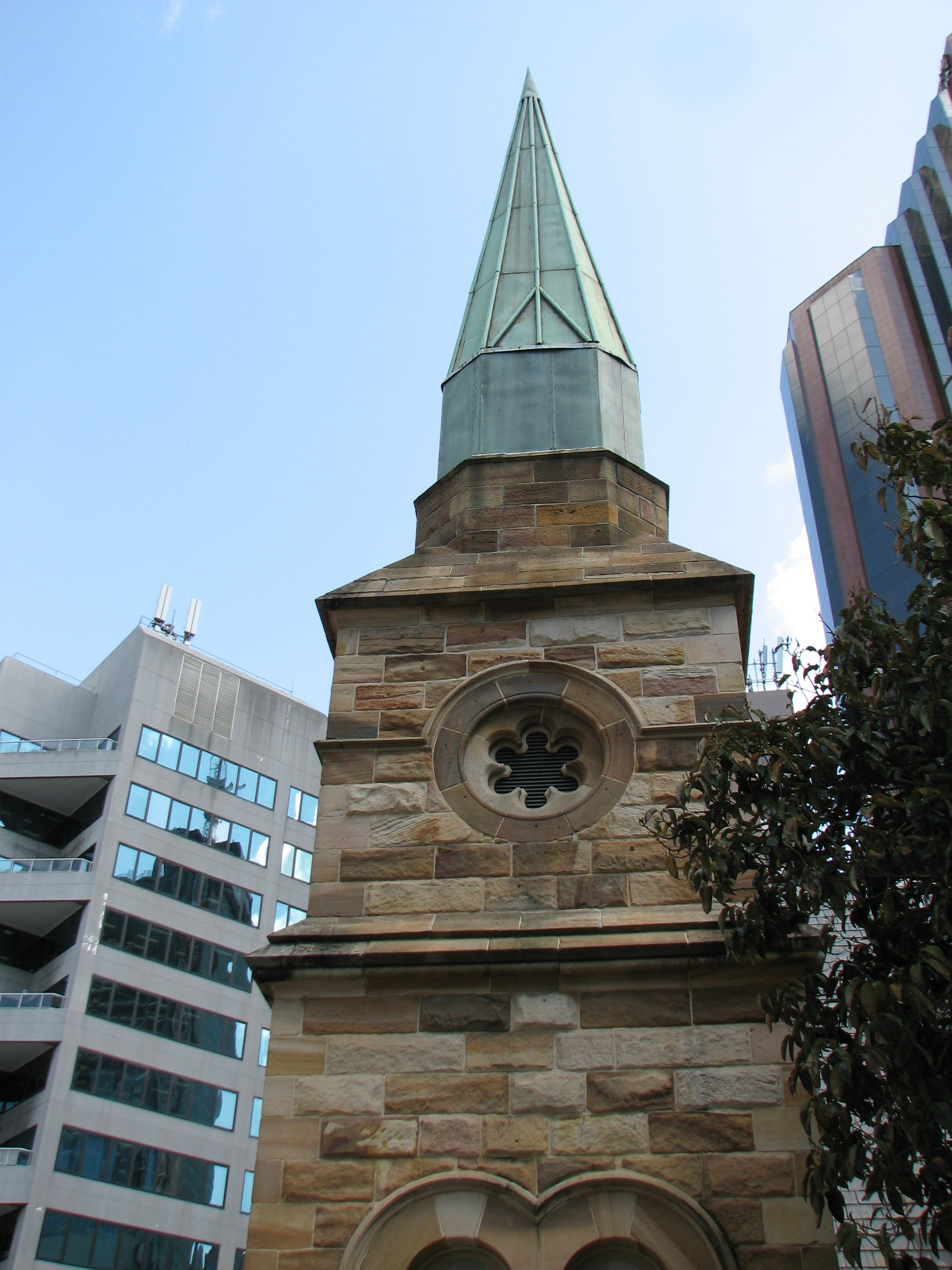
Greenwood Hotel in 2018

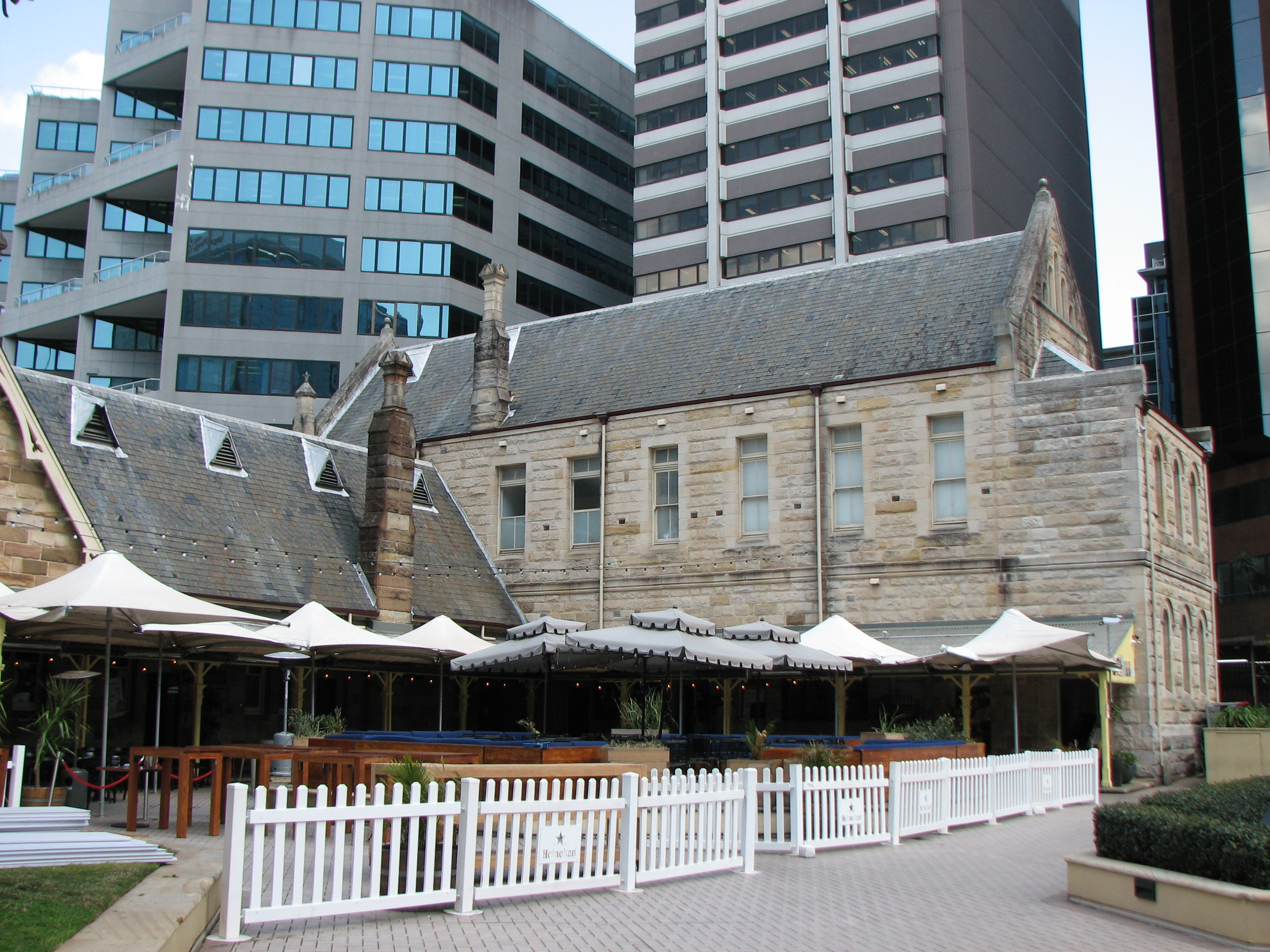
Greenwood Hotel in 2018

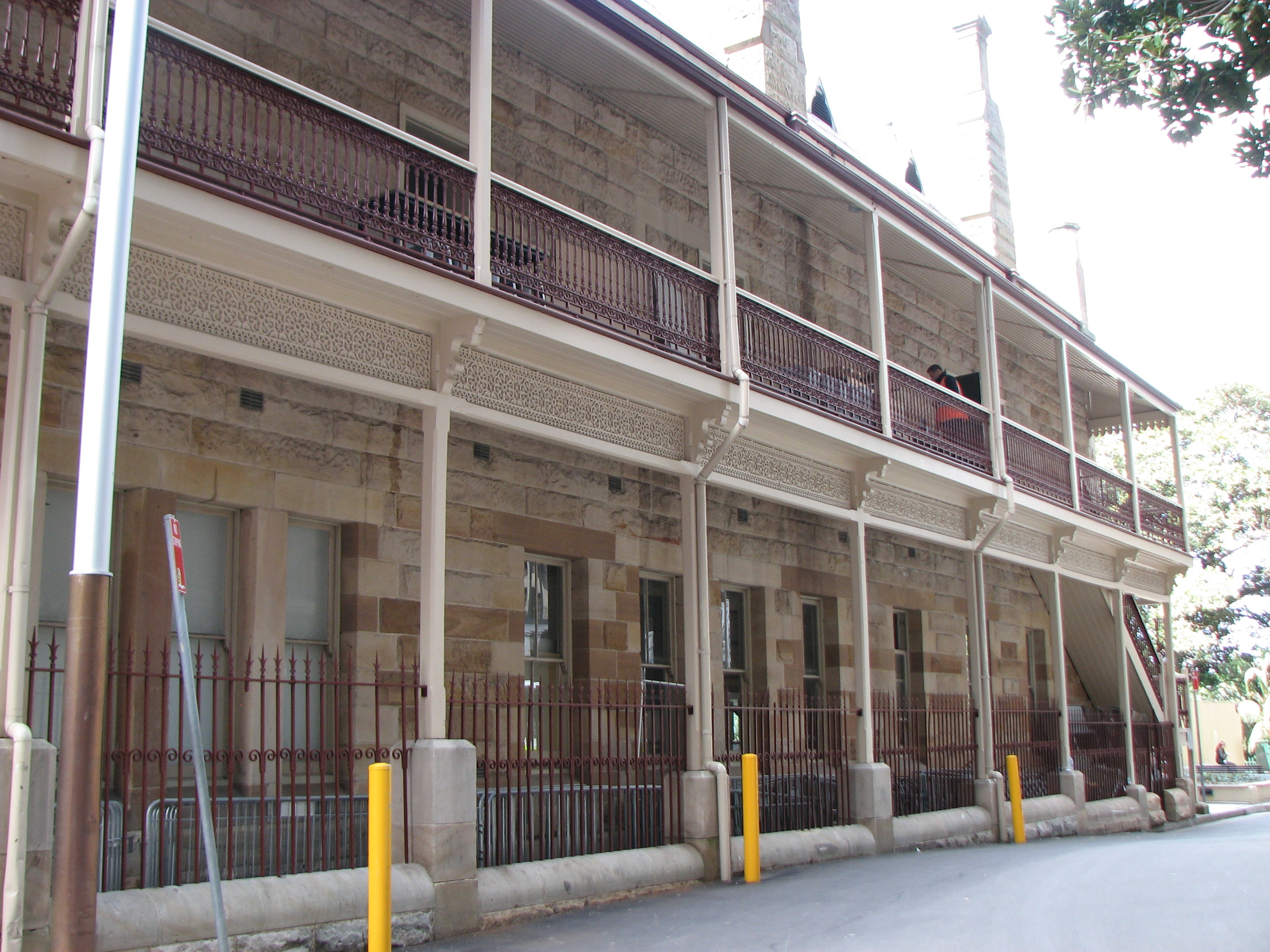
Greenwood Hotel in 2018

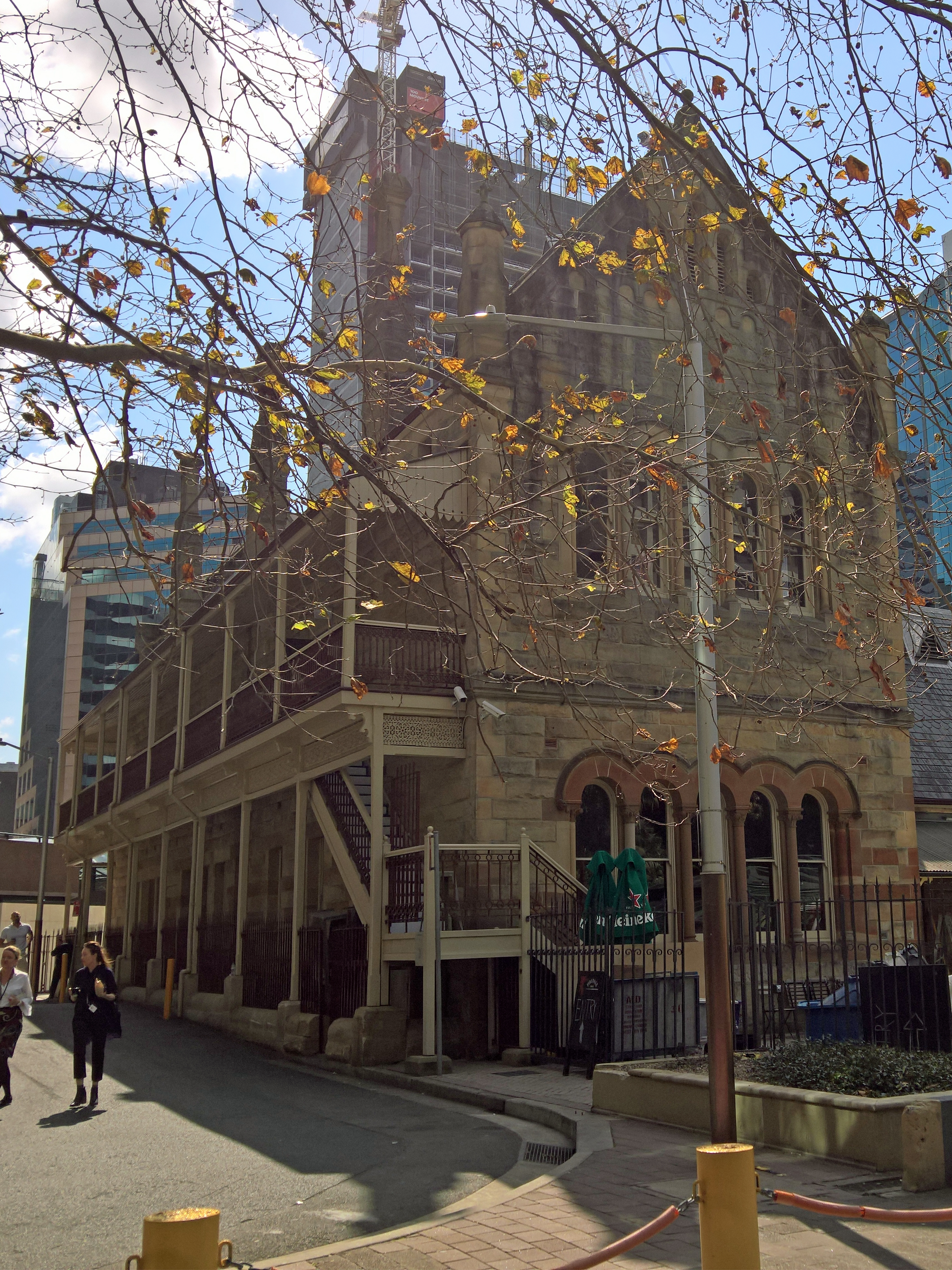
Greenwood Hotel in 2018

== Alumni ==
=== The Old Lions ===
The Old Lions is made up of the former students and teachers of that school and provides a contact point for those connected with the school via its newsletters and reunions, and website. The Old Lions holds a members' dinner and a teachers' lunch each year, and provides a monetary award to Killara High School students for Excellence in Technology and Applied Studies. A large proportion of The Old Lions' memorabilia is recorded in an online database. Membership of the association remains very strong considering that the school closed more than 40 years ago.

== Heritage listing ==
As at 29 September 2008, the Greenwood Hotel is a rare and unique example of Gothic and Romanesque Revival styles and remains substantially intact from 1908. The earliest wing of the school was built to the design of architect George Mansfield, a prominent architect of the time, and is an exceptional example of his work. The other parts of the building demonstrate the work of another notable 19th century state school Architect William Kemp. The Greenwood Hotel was the first state school erected on the north shore of Port Jackson and was the first technical school on the north shore. The fact that the school was used continuously for educational purposes from 1877 to 1969 is of high significance and has created a strong cultural meaning to people in the area. The sandstone structure is now surrounded by open landscaping and urban development elements and the nearby towers are set away from the Greenwood Hotel. This space has become an important urban precinct for retailers, office workers and locals, and is well utilised as a pedestrian thoroughfare and a place to meet and relax. The two remaining Moreton Bay fig trees retain the setting of the Greenwood Hotel and the landmark qualities of the area. The sandstone building is a scarcity of architectural type and is relatively intact. The age of the building relates to the predominant fabric of North Sydney and the building fabric itself demonstrates this historical significance. The school and its open setting with fig trees are landmarks of North Sydney and engender a high degree of public esteem in relation to its local and schooling history.

North Sydney Technical High School was listed on the New South Wales State Heritage Register on 2 April 1999.

== See also ==
- List of defunct schools in Australia
