= Frank Coaldrake =

Australian Anglican priest and Archbishop-elect of Brisbane

Frank William Coaldrake (12 March 1912 – 22 July 1970) was an Australian priest in the Church of England in Australia (as the Anglican Church of Australia was then called). A noted pacifist during WWII, Coaldrake was subsequently an Anglican missionary in Japan. He was the Chairman of the Australian Board of Missions when, in 1970, he was elected Archbishop of Brisbane, but he died before being consecrated.

== Early life ==
Coaldrake was born in Brisbane in 1912 to an insurance superintendent, Thomas Coaldrake, and his wife Eliza (née Smith). His siblings included Joyce, Keith (who also became an Anglican clergyman) and Bruce (who donated a significant collection of Aboriginal artefacts to the National Museum of Australia).

He was educated at Sandgate State School, Sandgate, and Brisbane Grammar School, and then trained as a teacher at the Queensland Teachers' Training College, Brisbane. During a short teaching career he became an external student at the University of Queensland.

Having been introduced to members of the Bush Brotherhoods, from 1932 to 1936 he was warden of the boys' hostel in Charleville which was run by the Brotherhood of St Paul.

== Career ==
In 1936 Coaldrake returned to study full-time at UQ, in the school of mental and moral philosophy. He won a Blue for rowing and was the editor of the student newspaper Semper Floreat. In 1937 he was a representative of the UQ student union at the meeting at which the National Union of Australian University Students was formed; in 1940 he was its third president. He graduated BA in 1938 and MA in 1944.

In 1938–39 he was the travelling secretary of the Australian Student Christian Movement. During this time he became a convinced pacifist. Three weeks after the declaration of war in 1939, he founded The Peacemaker, a monthly paper to inform and assist those who conscientiously objected to military service. Also in 1939 Fr Gerard Tucker recruited Coaldrake to the Brotherhood of St Laurence to work in the inner-Melbourne suburb of Fitzroy as a community worker.

He obtained his licentiate from the Australian College of Theology in 1942 and was ordained deacon that year and priest the following year. He served a curacy at St Cuthbert's, East Brunswick and was assistant to the socialist Dean of St Paul's Cathedral, Melbourne, Henry Langley.

Coaldrake was president of the Federal Pacifist Council of Australia from 1943 to 1946, which was viewed with concern by the Church hierarchy and the Commonwealth Security Service. He offered to serve as a missionary in Japan, initially in 1943 at the height of the war to Dr H. V. Evatt, the Minister for External Affairs and which was declined, but which was accepted by Bishop George Cranswick, Chairman of the Australian Board of Missions in 1946. He spent 15 months studying Japanese at the University of Sydney and was assistant priest to Fr John Hope at Christ Church St Laurence.

He arrived in Japan in June 1947 to work in the battered and demoralised Japanese Episcopal Church: 71 out of 246 churches had been destroyed. He remained in Japan (with his wife, Maida, from 1949) until 1956. During this time the Coaldrakes founded St Mary's Anglican Church, Izu, and Coaldrake was Rector from 1952 to 1956. In 1956 they returned to Australia when Coaldrake became Chairman of the Australian Board of Missions from the start of 1957.

In 1960 Coaldrake was made a canon of All Souls' Quetta Memorial Cathedral, Thursday Island. During his time as chairman, in 1967 he persuaded the ABM to abandon the goal of assimilation of Aborigines, and to pursue the principle of acceptance.

In 1970 Philip Strong announced his retirement as Archbishop of Brisbane. On 10 July Coaldrake was the first Australian-born priest to be elected archbishop. Before being consecrated, he suffered an intragastric haemorrhage and died of myocardial infarction on 22 July at the Royal North Shore Hospital, Sydney. His funeral was held at Christ Church St Laurence on 24 July: the requiem mass was celebrated by his friend Felix Arnott, Coadjutor Bishop of Melbourne, who had also celebrated Coaldrake's wedding at Christ Church St Laurence. Arnott was elected Archbishop of Brisbane in Coaldrake's place; it was not until 1990 and the election of Peter Hollingworth that an Australian-born archbishop took office.

== Personal life ==
Coaldrake married Maida Stelmar Williams (1919–2010) in 1949 at Christ Church St Laurence whilst on furlough. They had three children: a son, William, and two daughters, Margaret and Kimi.

He was buried in the Northern Suburbs Cemetery (now called the Macquarie Park Cemetery and Crematorium). His widow was subsequently a history academic at the Universities of Sydney and Tasmania, and then on the staff of St Hilda's Anglican Girls School, Tokyo.

== Legacy ==
The pacifist newspaper that Coaldrake founded, The Peacemaker, continued publication until 1971.

He is commemorated in a set of stained-glass windows at St John's Cathedral, Brisbane.

The University of Sydney awards a scholarship each year from the Frank Coaldrake Memorial Fund to support post-graduate students in Japanese or East Asian Studies.

The Anglican Board of Mission - Australia awards an annual ABM Frank Coaldrake Award to a missionary, volunteer or staff member of ABM.
