= Tranby, Glebe =

Tranby
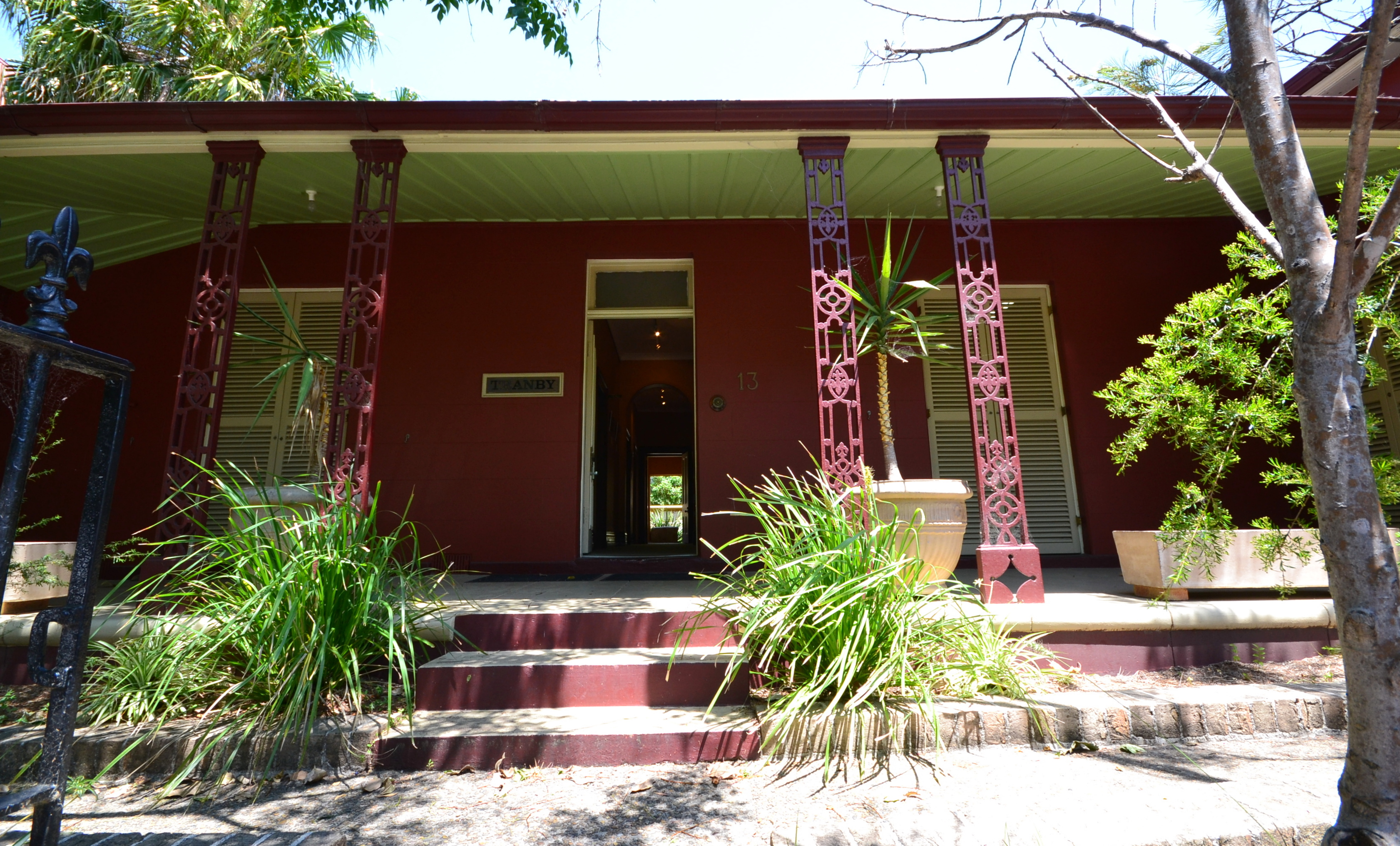

- Location within Sydney
- 33°52′40″S 151°10′59″E
- Location: 13 Mansfield Street, Glebe, City of Sydney, New South Wales, Australia

History
- Built: 1858–1910

Site notes
- Architect(s): A. L. & G. McCredie
- Architectural style: Post-Regency
- Owner: Co-operative for Aborigines Ltd

New South Wales Heritage Register
- Official name: Tranby; Toxteth Cottage
- Type: State heritage (built)
- Designated: 2 April 1999
- Reference no.: 21
- Type: Adult Education
- Category: Aboriginal

Tranby is heritage-listed former residence located at 13 Mansfield Street in Glebe, Sydney.New South Wales. It was designed by A. L. & G. McCredie and built from 1858 to 1910, and is also known as Toxteth Cottage.

Since 1958 the house and grounds have been the main campus of Tranby National Indigenous Adult Education and Training, and they are owned by Tranby Aboriginal Co-operative Ltd. The property was added to the New South Wales State Heritage Register on 2 April 1999.

== History ==
=== History of the area ===
The Leichhardt area was originally inhabited by the Wangal clan of Aboriginal people. After the colonisation of Australia in 1788, diseases such as smallpox, along with the loss of their hunting grounds, caused huge reductions in their numbers, and they moved further inland. Since European settlement the foreshores of Blackwattle Bay and Rozelle Bay have developed a unique maritime, industrial and residential character - a character which continues to evolve as areas which were originally residential estates, then industrial areas, are redeveloped for residential units and parklands.

The first formal land grant in the Glebe area was a 162-hectare (400-acre) grant to Richard Johnson, the colony's first chaplain, in 1789. The Glebe (land allocated for the maintenance of a church minister) comprised rolling shale hills covering sandstone, with several sandstone cliff faces. The ridges were drained by several creeks including Blackwattle Creek, Orphan School Creek and Johnston Creek. Extensive swampland surrounded the creeks. On the shale ridges, heavily timbered woodlands contained several varieties of eucalypts while the swamplands and tidal mudflats had mangroves, swamp oaks (Casuarina glauca) and blackwattles (Callicoma serratifolia) after which the bay is named. Blackwattle Swamp was first mentioned by surveyors in the 1790s and Blackwattle Swamp Bay in 1807. By 1840 it was called Blackwattle Bay. Boat parties collected wattles and reeds for the building of huts, and kangaroos and emus were hunted by the early settlers who called the area the Kangaroo Ground. Rozelle Bay is thought to have been named after a schooner which once moored in its waters.

Johnson's land remained largely undeveloped until 1828, when the Church and School Corporation subdivided it into 28 lots, three of which they retained for church use.

The Church sold 27 allotments in 1828 - north on the point and south around Broadway. The Church kept the middle section where the Glebe Estate is now. On the point the sea breezes attracted the wealthy who built villas. The Broadway end attracted slaughterhouses and boiling down works that used the creek draining to Blackwattle Swamp. Up until the 1970s the Glebe Estate was in the possession of the Church.

On the point the sea breezes attracted the wealthy who built villas. The Broadway end attracted slaughterhouses and boiling down works that used the creek draining to Blackwattle Swamp. Smaller working-class houses were built around these industries. Abattoirs were built there from the 1860s. When Glebe was made a municipality in 1859 there were pro and anti-municipal clashes in the streets. From 1850 Glebe was dominated by wealthier interests.

Reclaiming the swamp, Wentworth Park opened in 1882 as a cricket ground and lawn bowls club. Rugby union football was played there in the late 19th century. The dog racing started in 1932. In the early 20th century modest villas were broken up into boarding houses as they were elsewhere in the inner city areas. The wealthier moved into the suburbs which were opening up through the railways. Up until the 1950s Sydney was the location for working class employment - it was a port and industrial city. By the 1960s central Sydney was becoming a corporate city with service-based industries - capital intensive not labour-intensive. A shift in demographics occurred, with younger professionals and technical and administrative people servicing the corporate city wanting to live close by. Housing was coming under threat and the heritage conservation movement was starting. The Fish Markets moved in in the 1970s. An influx of students came to Glebe in the 1960s and 1970s.

=== History of Tranby ===
"Tranby", originally known as "Toxteth Cottage", was first listed in the Sands Directory in 1858 and is thought to have been completed in that year. It was situated in the grounds of George Allen's Toxteth Park Estate. Allen, a founding member of the legal firm Allen, Allen and Hemsley, President of the Bank of New South Wales 1860-66, Mayor of Sydney 1844-5 and Member of the Legislative Council 1845-73, owned the property. The cottage was the residence of Allen's daughter Mary and her husband George Allen Mansfield. Mansfield was the son of Ralph Mansfield, a Wesleyan Minister and the secretary of the Australian Gas Light Company from 1837 to 1879. He and Mary lived in the house until 1861. The cottage became known as Tranby in the 1870s when Allen's other daughter Elizabeth and her husband William Binnington Boyce lived there.

On the death of George Allen, Toxteth Park Estate was subdivided and in 1887, Tranby was purchased by Allen's brother, William Boyce Allen. In 1910 additions were made to the house to accommodate William Allen's large family.

In 1931 Tranby became a hostel for the University of Sydney and was the home of John Hope of Christ Church St Laurence. The property remained in the Boyce Allen family until 1946. In 1957 Tranby became a Training Centre for the "development of co-operative practices for Aborigines", under the control of the Australian Board of Missions Christian Community Co-operative and run by the Rev Alf Clint.

In 1971 the name "Tranby Co-operative for Aborigines Ltd." was registered. Tranby is now an Aboriginal-managed, community-based, non-profit co-operative, with the college forming the largest part of the facility. It is a meeting place for senior community members and has been the scene of key issues in the history of Indigenous activism, including meetings which led to the Royal Commission into Aboriginal Deaths in Custody.

The college was redeveloped in 1997-98 to accommodate the increasing demands on community and educational programmes. Cracknell Lonergan Architects collaborated with Merrima Design Unit to design a series of new buildings and classrooms around a courtyard. The design was inspired by the concept of Indigenous learning circles. The building was officially opened in 1998.

== Description ==
Tranby is a post-Regency style cottage, designed on an asymmetrical plan. It retains the low lines and broad proportions of early colonial dwellings. The front elevation describes three stages of building. The original section, containing six rooms, is central to the facade describing a Georgian character recessed into the whole. A central door opening and French doors either side open to a verandah which is supported by cast iron columns. The front verandah is flanked on either side by later editions. The later edition of a smaller parapet-fronted wing adds an Italianate flavour to the whole. The whole is covered with a slate hipped roof with metal ridge capping and box gutters. Wall fabric varies from cement rendered brick ashlar, to sandstone lime rendered ashlar coursing. Tranby has fifteen rooms.

=== Condition ===
Generally sound structural condition.

=== Modifications and dates ===
- 1880s - northern wing addition
- 1910 - eastern wing addition

== Heritage listing ==
As at 1 October 1997, Tranby and its history can be viewed as reflecting the evolutionary changes which took place on the Glebe Peninsula in architecture, land allocation and the growth and diversity of society. It is a fine example of a post-Regency picturesque cottage and one of the earliest buildings in Glebe to have an asymmetrical plan. The property is the focus for the Tranby Aboriginal Co-operative, the first and only independent, Aboriginal controlled adult education centre in Australia. It has been the scene of a number of key issues in the history of indigenous activism. Tranby Aboriginal Co-operative has contributed significantly to policy development and other initiatives facing Aboriginal peoples, presently and over the last 36 years. It has become a landmark for Australia's Aboriginal people and the world's indigenous peoples.

Tranby was listed on the New South Wales State Heritage Register on 2 April 1999 having satisfied the following criteria.

The place is important in demonstrating the course, or pattern, of cultural or natural history in New South Wales.

Tranby and its history can be viewed as reflecting the evolutionary changes which took place on the Glebe Peninsula in architecture, land allocation and the growth and diversity of society. It was the first house built on the Toxteth Estate after Toxteth House and remained in the Allen family until the 1840s. Two of the boundary streets (Boyce and Mansfield) are named after notable inhabitants of the cottage.

The property is also the focus for the Tranby Aboriginal Co-operative, the first and only independent, Aboriginal controlled adult education centre in Australia. It has been the scene of a number of key issues in the history of Indigenous activism, including meetings which led to the Royal Commission into Black Deaths in Custody.

The place is important in demonstrating aesthetic characteristics and/or a high degree of creative or technical achievement in New South Wales.

Tranby is a fine example of a post-Regency picturesque cottage and one of the earliest buildings in Glebe to have an asymmetrical plan. It has a harmonious and unspoilt stylistic unity.

The place has a strong or special association with a particular community or cultural group in New South Wales for social, cultural or spiritual reasons.

Tranby Aboriginal Co-operative has contributed significantly to policy development and other initiatives facing Aboriginal peoples, presently and over the last 36 years. It has become a landmark for Australia's Aboriginal people and the world's Indigenous peoples. It is a local and regional landmark for the non-Aboriginal community which has established a relationship with Tranby through education in Aboriginal culture and involvement with human rights movements. It has become a symbol of the integrity of Aboriginal culture within a European social and political structure.

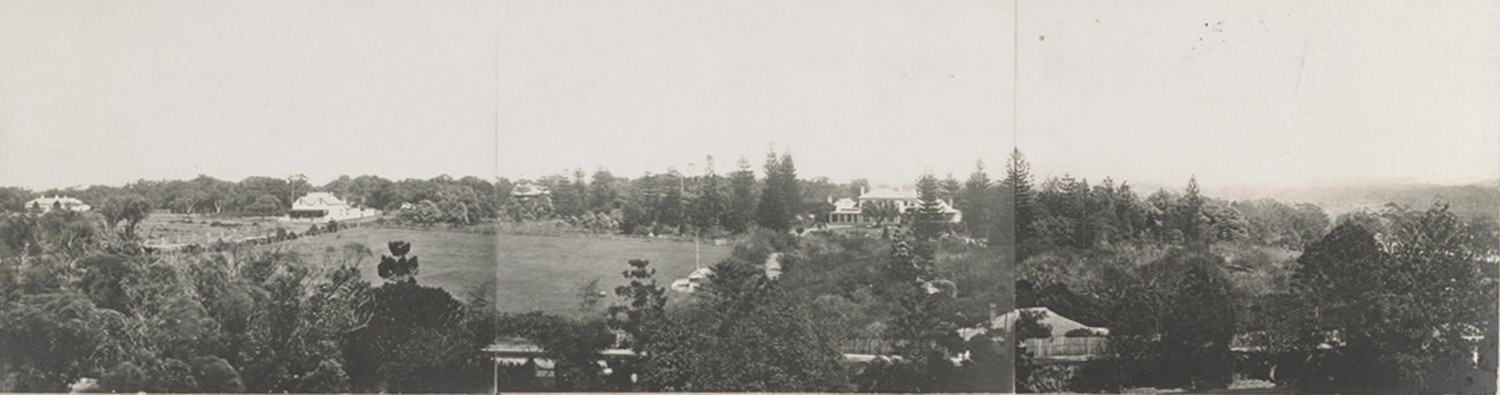
Glebe circa 1875 — the house on the far left is Tranby, the one in the middle Emslee and the house on the far right is Toxteth Park.

== See also ==
- Australian residential architectural styles
