= Harold Collocott =

Australian rules footballer

Personal information
- Full name: Harold Fitzroy Collocott
- Born: 25 June 1883; Kadavu Island, Fiji
- Died: 12 September 1955 (aged 72); South Australia
- Original team: Geelong College

Playing career^{1}
| Years | Club | Games (Goals) |
| 1900 | Geelong | 1 (0) |
- ^{1} Playing statistics correct to the end of 1900.

Harold Fitzroy Collocott (25 June 1883 – 12 September 1955) was an Australian rules footballer who played with Geelong in the Victorian Football League (VFL).

Collocott was born in Fiji, the son of Methodist missionary Alfred John Collocott. His brother E. E. V. Collocott was a Methodist missionary in Tonga. During World War I he served in the Australian Cycling Corps.
