= E. E. V. Collocott =

Australian missionary (1886–1970)

Ernest Edgar Vyvyan Collocott (7 June 1886 – 9 October 1970) was an Australian Methodist missionary, ethnologist and peace activist. He was known for his ethnological works on Tonga, where he served as a missionary between 1911 and 1924.

== Early life ==
Collocott was born on 7 June 1886 in Northcote, Victoria. He was the son of Alice Jane (née Bickford) and Alfred John Collocott, a Methodist missionary in Fiji. His older brother was Harold Collocott.

Collocott was educated at The Geelong College where he was dux in 1902. He went on to the University of Melbourne, graduating Bachelor of Arts in 1907 and Master of Arts in 1909 with honours in classical philology. He later completed a Bachelor of Divinity by correspondence through the University of London in 1916 and was awarded the degree of Doctor of Letters by Melbourne in 1928.

== Tonga ==
After a period as a schoolteacher, Collocott entered the Methodist ministry and was sent to Tonga in 1911. He was initially posted to the Haʻapai archipelago before becoming principal of Tupou College in 1915. He oversaw the college's relocation from Nukuʻalofa to Nafualu in 1921, returning to Australia in 1924 due to his family's ill health.

Collocott took a keen interest in the history and culture of the Tongan people. He wrote on Tongan myths, legends, linguistics, customs and astronomy. He also assisted American anthropologists Edward Winslow Gifford and William C. McKern with their work in Tonga in association with the Bishop Museum. Collocott was the first to date the advent of the Tuʻi Tonga Empire to 950 AD, using dynastic genealogies. After returning to Australia, he published Koe Ta'u'e Teau (1926) and Tales and Poems of Tonga (1928), as well as lecturing on Tongan culture and beginning an English-language history of Tonga. Along with Gifford's Tongan Myths and Tales (1924), Tales and Poems has been described as one of the two major collections of Tongan legends.

== Later life and activism ==
After returning to Australia Collocott was posted to various towns in country New South Wales, eventually retiring to Epping in 1952. From the early 1930s he was active in the pacificist movement, serving as president of the Peace Pledge Union in 1933 and as chairman of the New South Wales Peace Council from 1953 to 1955. He was the editor of The Peacemaker, the movement's newspaper.

Identifying as a Christian socialist, Collocott joined the Australian Labor Party in 1957 but was also associated with the Communist Party of Australia. He had a long association with pro-Soviet organisations, initially with the Friendship with Russia League in the 1930s and later as president of the Democratic Rights Council (DRC), a Communist front. He represented the DRC at the 1952 session of the World Peace Council in East Berlin. He was national chairman of the Australia-Soviet Friendship Society and visited the Soviet Union in 1953 and 1962.

== Personal life ==
Collocott married Edith Idabelle Bickford in 1909, with whom he had five sons. He was widowed in 1947, remarrying to Dorothy Williams. He died on 9 October 1970 in Dundas, New South Wales.
