= Newtown Mission Uniting Church =

- Newtown Methodist Church
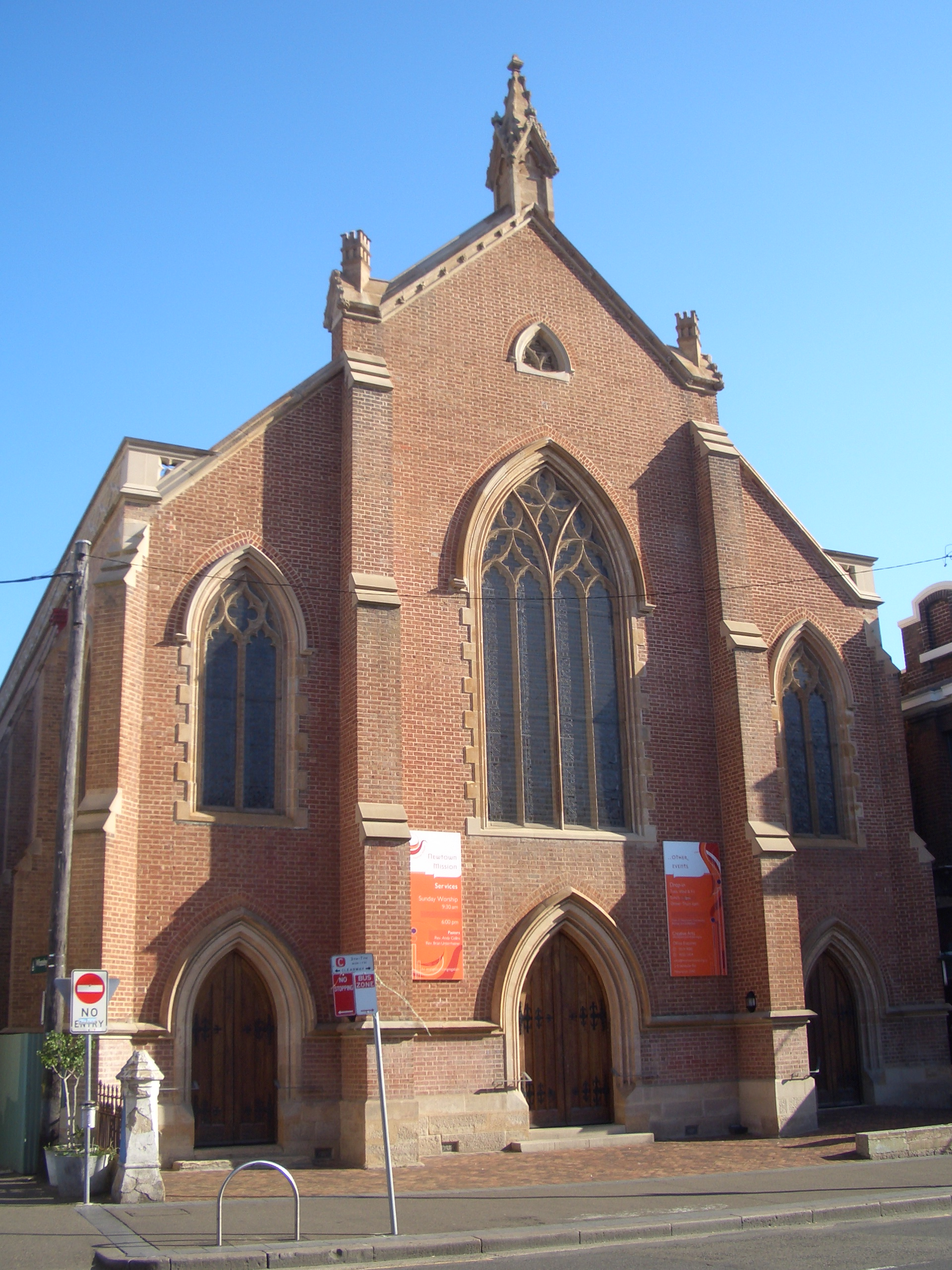
- Newtown Mission Uniting Church, pictured in 2007

- Location in greater Sydney
- 33°53′47″S 151°10′50″E
- Location: 280a King Street, Newtown, City of Sydney, New South Wales
- Country: Australia
- Denomination: Uniting
- Previous denomination: Methodist
- Website: www.newtownmission.org.au

History
- Status: Church

Architecture
- Functional status: Active
- Architect: George Allen Mansfield
- Architectural type: Church
- Style: Victorian Gothic
- Years built: 1859

Specifications
- Materials: Face brickwork; Sandstone base with stone dressings

Administration
- Parish: Newtown

New South Wales Heritage Register
- Official name: Uniting Church and Pipe Organ
- Type: State heritage (built)
- Designated: 2 April 1999
- Reference no.: 747
- Type: Church
- Category: Religion
- Builders: Thomas Abbott

The Newtown Mission Uniting Church is a heritage-listed Uniting church at 280a King Street, Newtown, City of Sydney, New South Wales, Australia. It was designed by George Allen Mansfield and built in 1859 by Thomas Abbott. It was added to the New South Wales State Heritage Register on 2 April 1999.

== History ==
The first Methodist services were held in brick cottages at the corner of King and Eliza Sts from about 1840. In 1847 the church decided to build a chapel, and in 1849 land was purchased at the corner of King St and Erskineville Rd, with the chapel completed by 1850. The current church was constructed in 1859 as Newtown Methodist Church on a new site to accommodate the growing Methodist population in the Newtown area during the period of rapid expansion.

The western gallery was erected in 1864. The interior was extensively altered in 1875. The eastern stained glass windows were added in 1882. The organ loft was added in 1910. Further renovations took place in 1923 and 1940.

It adopted its current name in 1977 following the Methodist Church's amalgamation into the new Uniting Church of Australia.

== Description ==
It is a two-storey Victorian Gothic style church constructed of face brickwork on sandstone base with stone dressings, buttresses and gable roof. The building is symmetrical, with triple gothic arched leadlight windows with stone tracery above panelled doors at ground-floor level. Remnant elements of cast-iron palisade fencing and gates with sandstone gateposts survive.

== Heritage listing ==
The church and its pipe organ were listed on the New South Wales State Heritage Register on 2 April 1999, having satisfied the following criteria.

The place is important in demonstrating the course, or pattern, of cultural or natural history in New South Wales.

The Uniting Church, formerly the Wesleyan Chapel, has important associations for Australian Wesleyan Methodists in that its origins were determined by the ideas promulgated by Frederick J. Jobson, secretary of the Wesleyan Methodist Conference in 1842. Out of the deliberations of the conference came the decision to hold a competition for a "Model Church" It was the winning design that formed the basis for this building, albeit modified by George Mansfield.

The organ was designed by a renowned firm of organ makers and has been a part of the church since 1878. The modifications made to it in 1910 were carried out by a prominent Australian firm.

The place is important in demonstrating aesthetic characteristics and/or a high degree of creative or technical achievement in New South Wales.

It was the first example of the "Model Plan" church to be erected in Australia and has been described as the "Mother Church of Australian Victorian Methodism". In view of its antecedent it can be said to be of international style, with its adaptation to Australian requirements, first by Mansfield and later by Rowe, being of particular significance.

Technically the organ was of a very advanced design and high standard of workmanship. The modifications made to it in 1910 were done with a similar standard of technical excellence and with respect for its provenance.

The place has a strong or special association with a particular community or cultural group in New South Wales for social, cultural or spiritual reasons.

It is significant for its 130 years of community relationship both of a religious and more recently of a secular nature.

The place possesses uncommon, rare or endangered aspects of the cultural or natural history of New South Wales.

The church is rare in that only two examples at Mudgee and Parramatta are thought to have survived. The organ is rare in that only two other such organs are thought to exist in the state, and, apart from its early modifications in the early 20th century, it has not been altered since.

== See also ==
- List of Uniting churches in Sydney
- Australian non-residential architectural styles
