= George Allen Mansfield =

Australian architect

George Allen Mansfield FRIBA

Councillor of the Municipality of The Glebe for Inner Glebe Ward
- In office 14 February 1866 – 23 December 1867

Alderman of the Borough of The Glebe for Inner Glebe Ward
- In office 23 December 1867 – 11 February 1878
- Succeeded by: Michael Chapman

Personal details
- Born: 15 June 1834 Sydney, Colony of New South Wales
- Died: 20 January 1908 (aged 73) Darling Point, New South Wales, Australia
- Spouse: Mary Emma Allen
- Children: Seven
- Occupation: Architect

Military service
- Allegiance: United Kingdom
- Branch/service: NSW Defence Force
- Years of service: 1860–1865
- Rank: Lieutenant
- Unit: Glebe Volunteer Rifles

George Allen Mansfield FRIBA (15 June 1834 – 20 January 1908) was a prominent Australian architect of the nineteenth century who designed many iconic buildings in Sydney, New South Wales, Australia.

== Life ==
Born in 1834 in Sydney, his father, the Reverend Ralph Mansfield, had been a Methodist missionary. He was educated at the privately run school of Mr. W. T. Cape and then articled with the architect John Frederick Hilly.

He married Mary Emma Allen, third daughter of prominent politician and solicitor George Allen, and had seven children. The family lived in Tranby, Glebe, which was designed by Mansfield. They then lived at Oakwood in Bridge Road From 1864 to 1869, and Lynedoch in Glebe Road from 1870 to 1879. Mansfield served as an Inner Glebe Ward Councillor (Alderman from 1867) for the Borough of The Glebe from 1866 to 1878.

Mansfield was a lieutenant in the Glebe branch of the New South Wales Militia, a commissioner for Peace and an alderman for Glebe Council. Mansfield was also a member of the Royal Institute of British Architects and was the first Australian-born architect to receive the honour of Fellowship. Mansfield was also the founder and first president of the NSW Institute of Architects (now the NSW Chapter of the Australian Institute of Architects).

He died in 1908, and was buried at Waverley Cemetery. He is remembered in the name of Mansfield Street, Glebe.

== Works ==
His many prominent colonial buildings including and ten listed on the NSW State Heritage Register, include:

=== Churches ===
- Pitt Street Uniting Church
- Mudgee Uniting Church
- Newtown Mission Uniting Church

=== Schools ===
Newcastle Public School circa 1879

- Castle Hill Public School, Sydney
- Cleveland Street Public School
- Crown Street Public School
- The Old School, Darlington
- Mudgee Public School (part)
- Newcastle East Public School
- North Sydney Technical High School (1876–1877)
- Pyrmont Public School
- Redfern Public School (now demolished)
- Rosebank College
- Sussex Street Primary School, Sydney

=== Houses ===
- Toxteth Park for his inlaws
- Carthona, Darling Point
- 'The Warren' at Marrickville
- Coombing Park at Carcoar for the founders of Cobb and Co

=== Commercial buildings ===
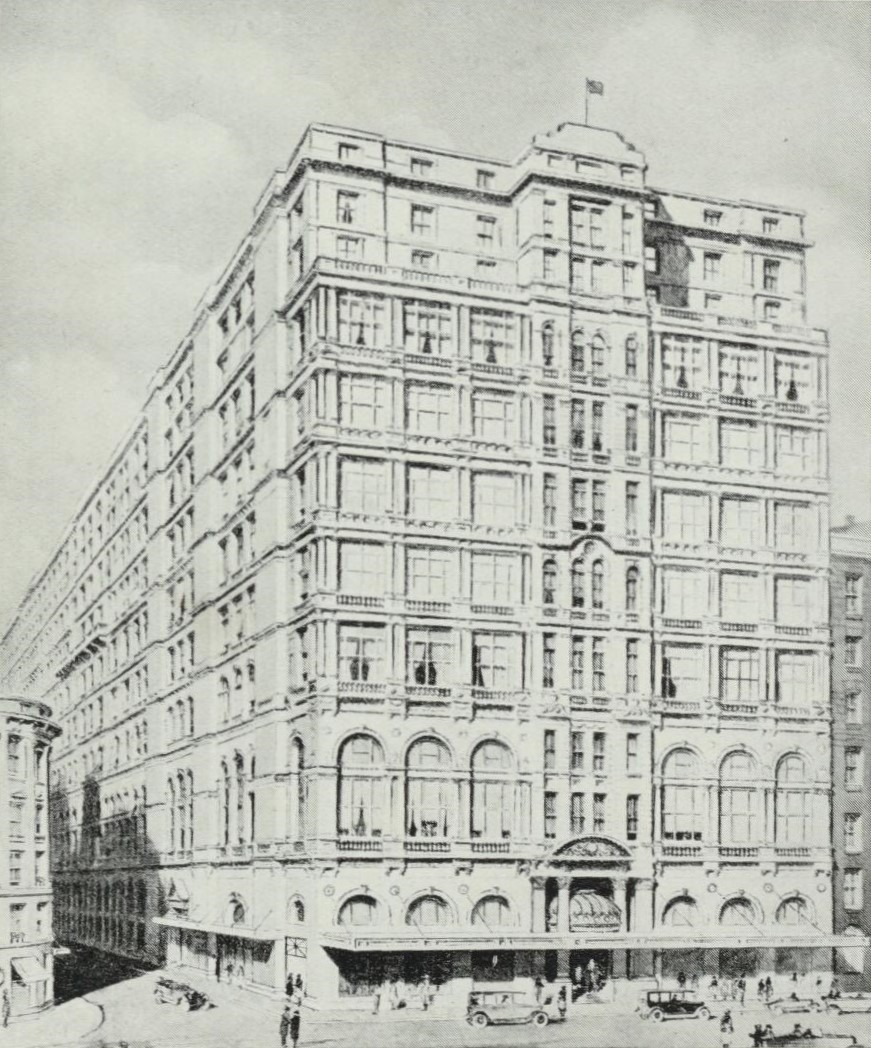
The Australia Hotel, 1932

- Australia Hotel (now demolished for the MLC Centre)
- several bank buildings for the Commercial Bank of Australia, now Westpac
- Australian Mutual Provident Society head office in Pitt Street, Sydney (1878; demolished 1909).
- Much of commercial building stock of O’Connell Street
- The Darling Harbour facilities of AGL Energy (now Demolished)
- Mansfield House in Maitland

=== Other ===
- Royal Prince Alfred Hospital, Admission Block and Victoria & Albert Pavilions (1904)
- History House, Macquarie Street offices for the Royal Australian Historical Society
- Macleay Museum (University of Sydney)

== Gallery ==
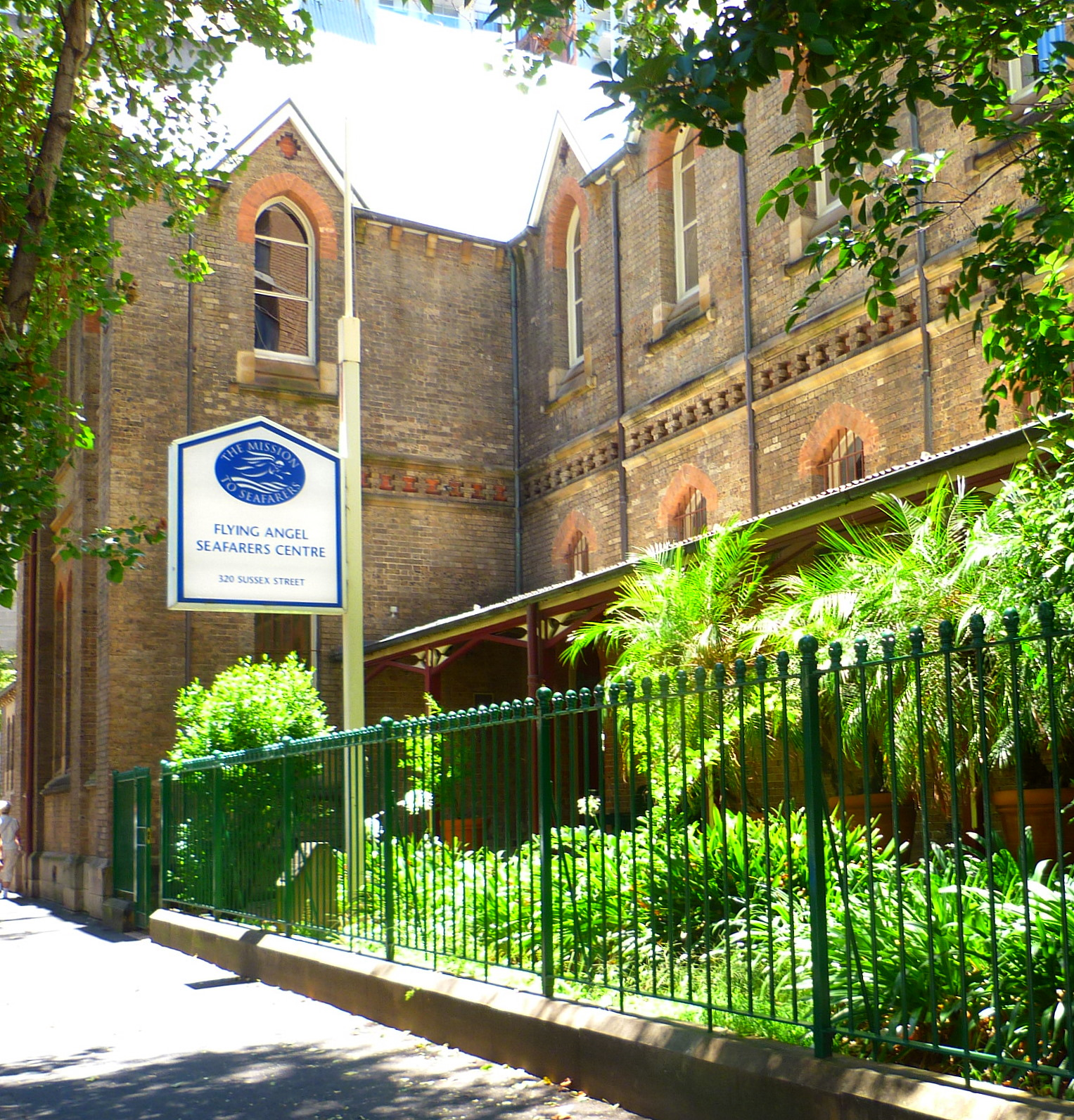
Former public school

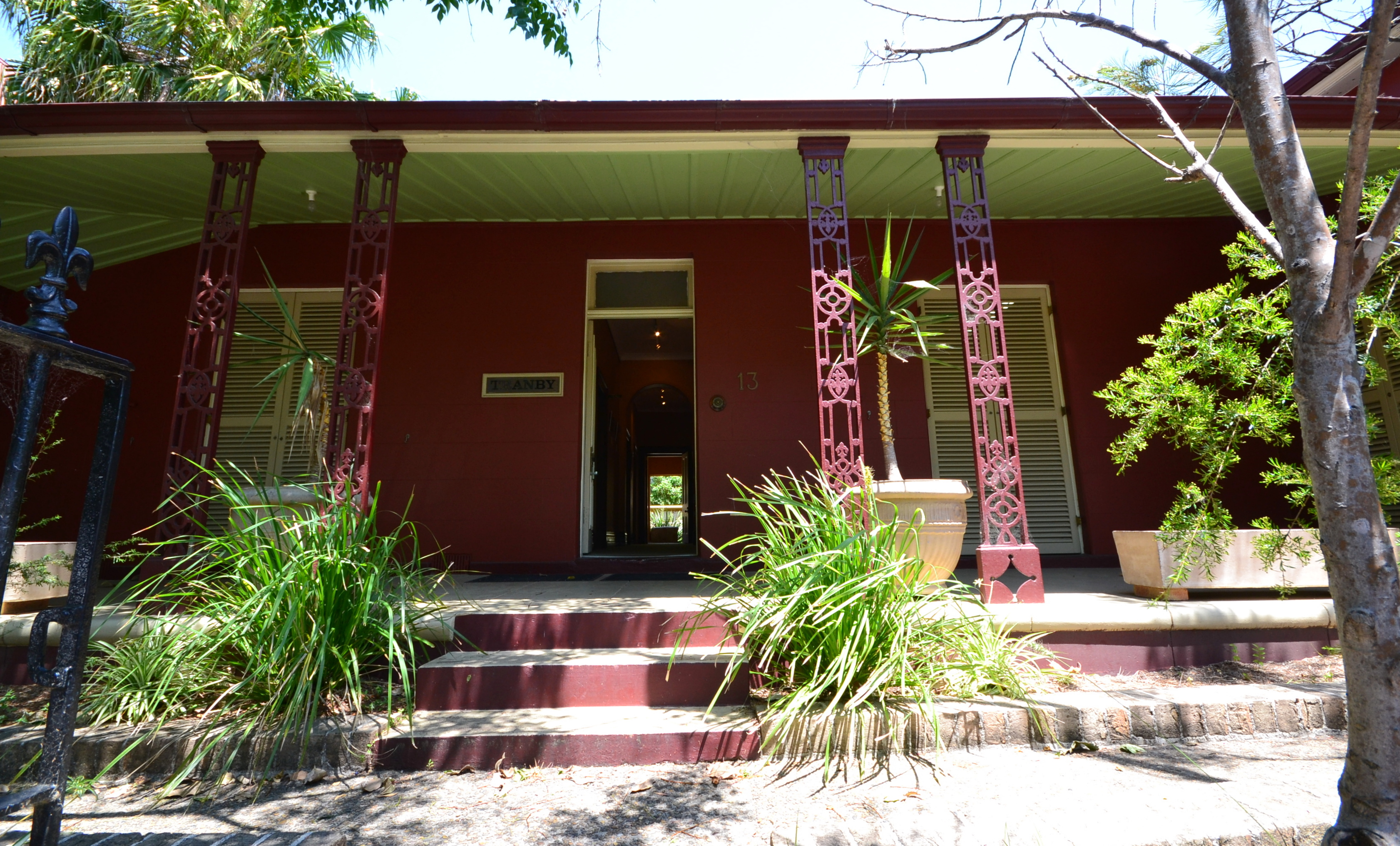
Tranby House, Glebe

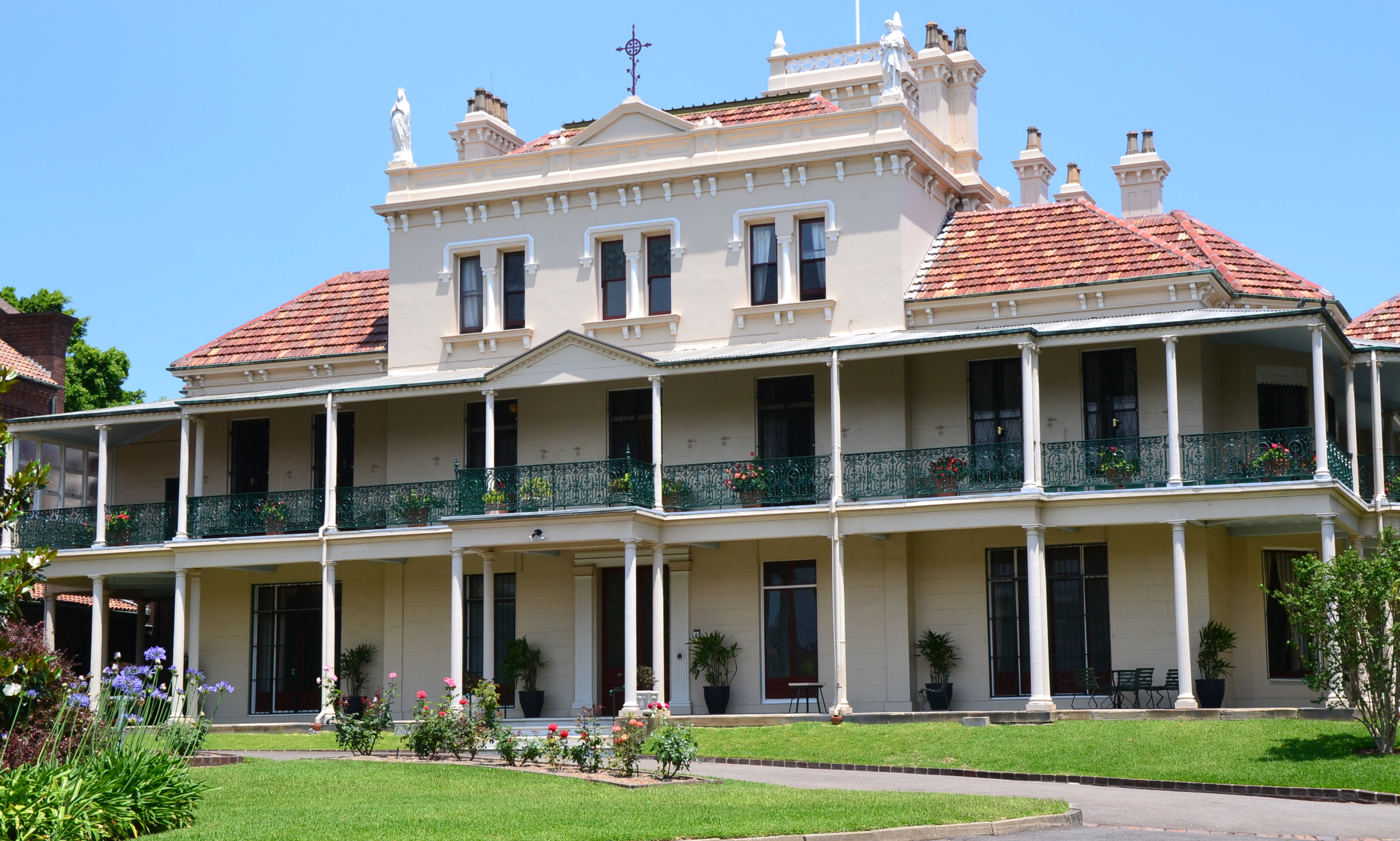
Additions to St Scholastica's, formerly known as Toxteth Park

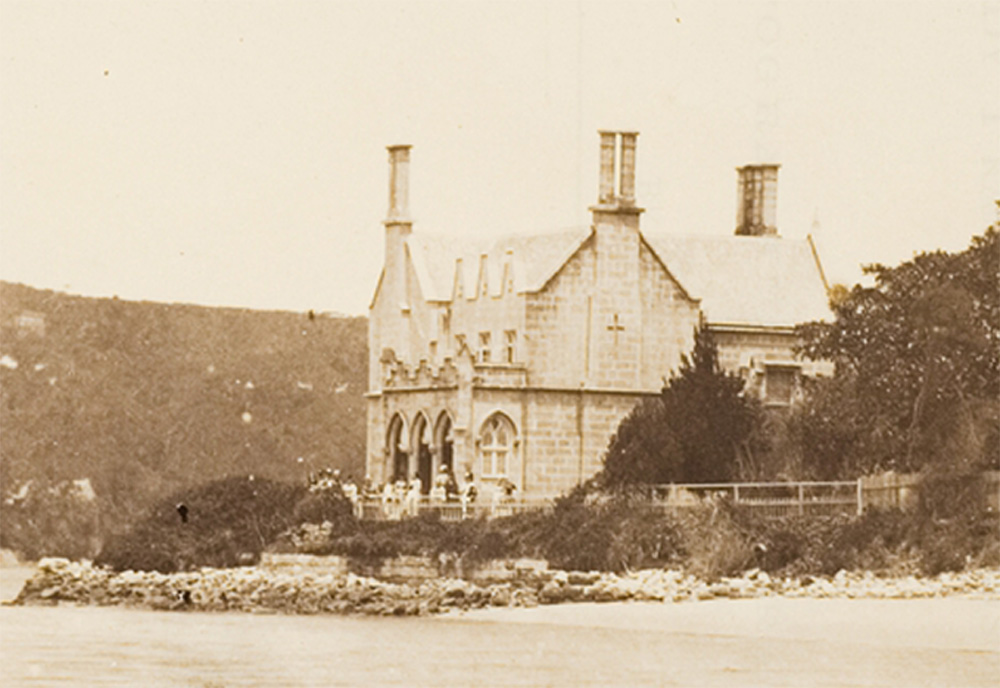
Carthona, Darling Point, circa 1870 before the 1880s extensions at the back were made

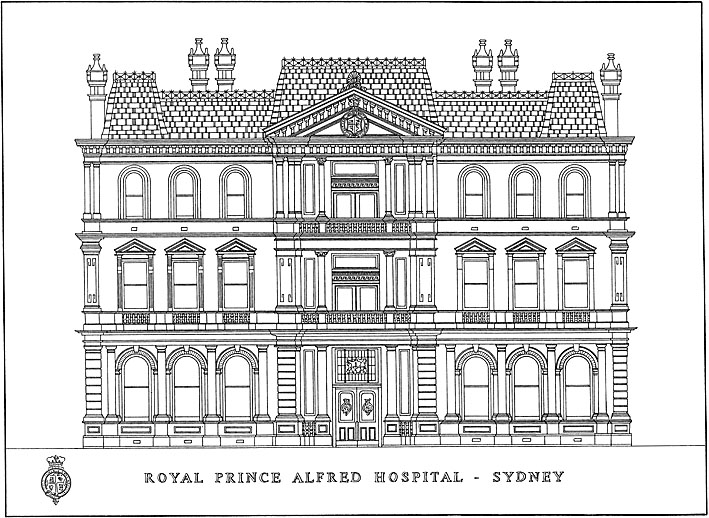
Royal Prince Alfred Hospital - Administration Building

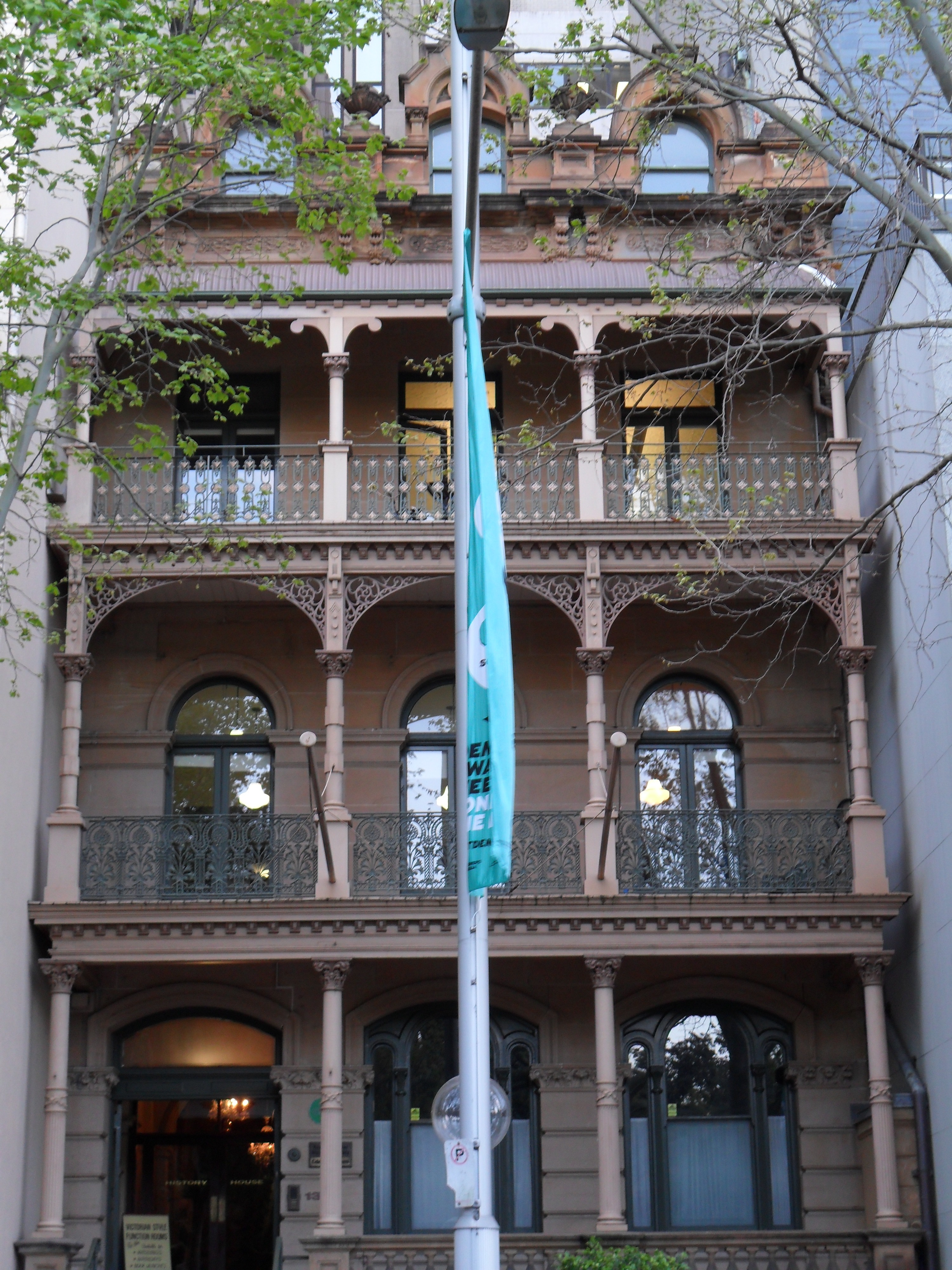
History House

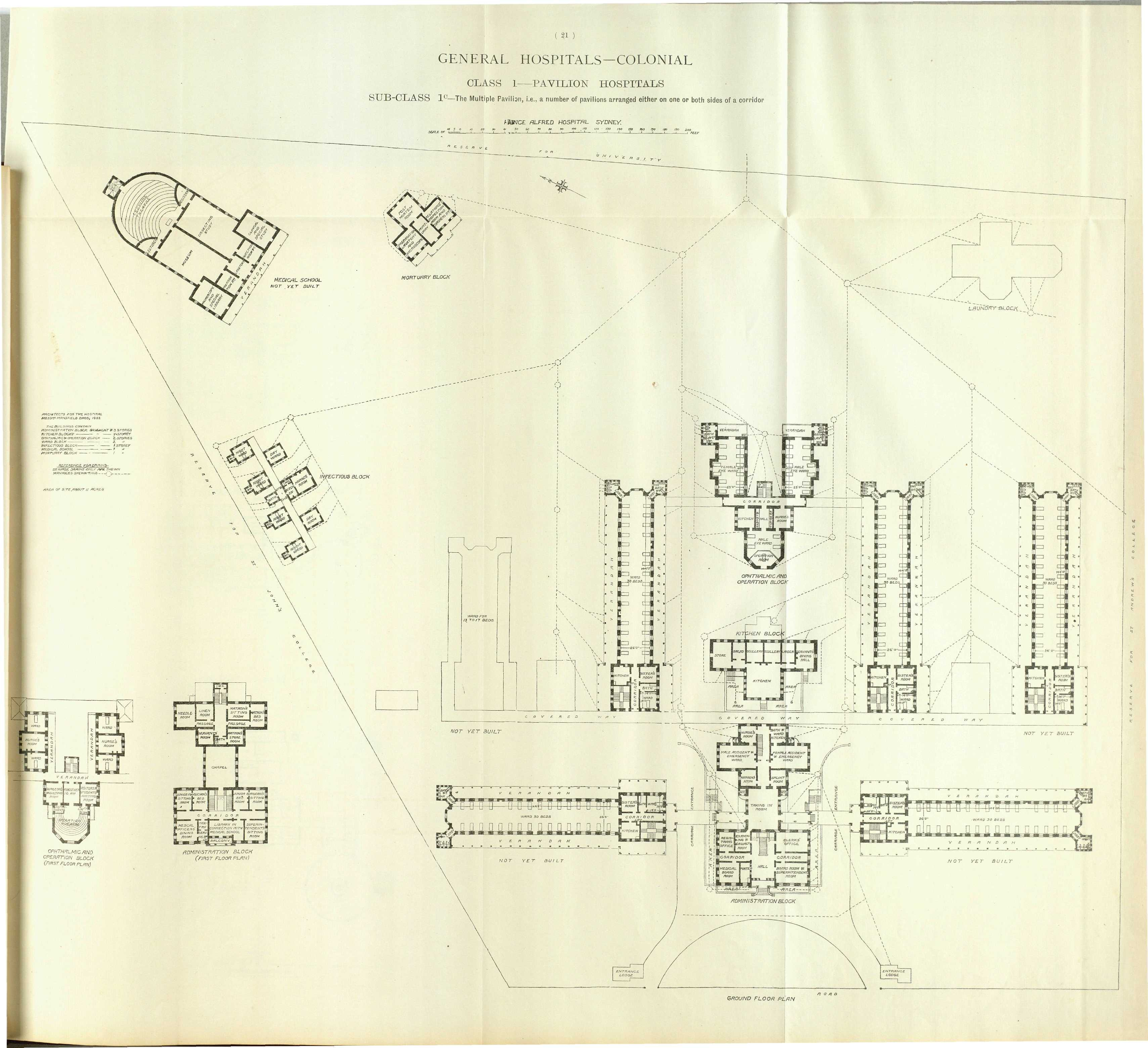
Mansfield's 1893 floor plan of RPA.

== See also ==
- List of George Allen Mansfield buildings

Professional and academic associations
New title	President of the Institute of Architects of New South Wales; 1871–1878	Succeeded by Thomas Rowe
Preceded by John Barlow	President of the Institute of Architects of New South Wales; 1902–1903	Succeeded by Cyril Blacket
