= South Bathurst, New South Wales =

South Bathurst New South Wales
- Coordinates: 33°26′6″S 149°34′34″E
- Population: 1,583 (2016 census)
- LGA(s): Bathurst Region
- State electorate(s): Bathurst
- Federal division(s): Calare

South Bathurst is a suburb of Bathurst, New South Wales, Australia, in the Bathurst Region.
