= Anglican Board of Mission – Australia =

National mission agency of the Anglican Church of Australia

The Anglican Board of Mission – Australia (ABM), formerly Australasian Board of Missions and Australian Board of Missions, is the national mission agency of the Anglican Church of Australia. In its earliest form, it was established in 1850.

== History ==
The Church of the Province of New Zealand was not formed until 1858. In 1850, George Selwyn, the Bishop of New Zealand, approached his fellow Australasian bishops for funds to buy a boat for evangelisation of the islands of Melanesia, which then formed part of his diocese by virtue of a clerical error in the letters patent. That missionary endeavour became the Melanesian Mission, but also led to the establishment of the Australasian Board of Missions.

In 1872 (by which time New Zealand was a separate province) the Australasian Board of Missions was constituted as a board of the church by a canon of General Synod. At that point the board changed its name to the Australian Board of Missions. It was only in 1872 that an administrative structure was created, with a general secretary.

The board celebrated its jubilee in 1900, at the consecration of Gilbert White as Bishop of Carpentaria at St Andrew's Cathedral, Sydney. The board was restructured in 1916, which led to the creation of an executive chairman position in place of the former general secretary; the Rev John Jones, general secretary since 1912, became the first chairman. Many chairmen (and the renamed national directors) were former diocesan bishops, including George Cranswick (1942–49), Donald Shearman (1971–73), Ken Mason (1983–93), and Geoffrey Smith (2000-05). Another notable chairman was the Rev Frank Coaldrake (1957–70), a prominent pacifist during WWII and who, in 1970, was elected Archbishop of Brisbane but died before being consecrated.

In 1953 the board created a department of co-operatives and appointed the Christian Socialist the Rev Alf Clint as director; Clint had previously established a series of co-operatives in Papua. At the time, the board still had a number of Aboriginal missions, and Clint travelled around them, establishing co-operatives at Lockhart River Mission (1954), Moa Island, Torres Strait (1956), and Cabbage Tree Island (1959). In 1957 Fr John Hope of Christ Church St Laurence gave Clint a house, Tranby, for his work with Aboriginals. Now (2021) called Tranby National Indigenous Adult Education and Training, Tranby is still run by the Co-operative for Aborigines Limited, founded by Clint. By 1959 the Lockhart River co-operative was bankrupt due to the collapse of the trochus shell market. In 1960 the Rt Rev John Matthews was elected Bishop of Carpentaria; he considered Clint to be a destabilizing influence and, in 1961, banned him from entry to Anglican missions in the diocese. That led the board in 1962 to replace its co-operative department with an autonomous body, Co-operative for Aborigines Ltd, of which Clint was the general secretary.

The board was renamed the Anglican Board of Mission – Australia in 1995.

== Work ==
As of 2021, its focus is on three programmes:

- Church to Church: leadership formation and training, and evangelism;
- Community Development: adult literacy, improved food security, water and sanitation, gender equality and social inclusion, livelihood support, some health services, HIV testing, counselling and awareness raising; and
- Reconciliation: reconciliation with Aboriginal and Torres Strait Islander Anglicans.

The Board also issues emergency appeals.

== Leaders past and present ==
=== Chairmen ===
- The Rev John Jones 1917-1922 (Bishop Long was offered the chairmanship in 1922, but declined, as it would have required him to resign his see.)
- The Rev John Stafford Needham 1922-42
- The Rt Rev George Cranswick, 1942-49
- The Ven Charles Shearer Robertson, 1949–56.
- The Rev Canon Frank Coaldrake, 1957-70
- The Rt Rev Donald Shearman, 1971-73
- The Ven John Alexander Munro, 1973–76.
- The Rev Canon (later the Rt Rev) Robert Leopold Butterss, 1976–83.
- The Rt Rev Ken Mason, 1983–93.

=== National directors ===
The position of chairman was renamed national director in 1993.

- The Rt Rev Brian Kyme, 1993–2000.
- The Rev (later the Most Rev) Geoffrey Smith, 2000–05.

=== Executive directors ===
The national director was renamed the executive director in 2005.

- Linda Kurti, 2005–08.
- The Rev John Deane, since 2008.
