= John Hope (priest) =

Anglican priest

John Hope (5 January 1891 – 21 June 1971) was an Anglican priest in the Anglo-Catholic tradition in Sydney, Australia.

== Early life and family ==
Born in Strathfield, the son of Charles Hope, a wool broker with Goldsbrough Mort & Co, Hope was the youngest of 10 children. His ancestors included the Rev Thomas Hassall, the first Australian resident to seek ordination in the Anglican Church and the Rev Samuel Marsden, an early chaplain in Sydney and the founder of the Anglican Church in New Zealand.

He was educated at Sydney Grammar School.

== Early ministry ==
Hope completed his theological training at Melbourne's St John's College before Archbishop Wright of Sydney made him a deacon in 1914 and ordained him a priest in 1916. As curate at the gentrified St Jude's Church, Randwick, the future Christian Socialist did not see eye to eye with many of the parishioners and the rector of St Jude's arranged a more suitable appointment for him as curate of the Anglo-Catholic inner-city Sydney parish of Christ Church St Laurence in 1916–1919.

From 1919 - 1925 he was vicar of the parochial district of All Saints, Clifton, in the Diocese of Brisbane, Queensland.

== Rector of Christ Church St Laurence ==
Hope returned to Christ Church St Laurence as locum tenens after the Rev Clive Statham resigned in 1925 and he was appointed rector in 1926.

In 1927, he established the processions of witness that were a regular feature of Sydney life for 40 years. They were “tremendous witnesses for the Faith” as well as “occasions of expressing unity with servers and clergy of sympathetic parishes in the diocese”.

The early years of his incumbency also saw the start of the Great Depression and the parish's own financial crisis when the diocese redistributed the funds from the parish schools and even attempted to prevent use of the parish hall. Yet for all this, the parish opened a soup kitchen for the unemployed and, in 1936, established the Boys’ Welfare Bureau. Hope's biographer said of his incumbency: "during the years when Christ Church was fighting hard for its very existence, the Catholic Faith was at its most triumphant, both in personal practice and in service to those in need."

By the end of his time at Christ Church St Laurence, Hope's renown (and influence) had spread across the Anglican Church through his encouragement of many hundreds of vocations to the priesthood and the religious life. His work with the poor was recognised when he received an MBE in 1956.

Hope also established contact with the Order of St Luke the Physician and started to conduct public services of healing, a ministry that continues to this day. Agnes Sanford wrote of a visit to a healing service at Christ Church St Laurence and informal prayer afterwards with a young woman with inoperable cancer: “But I knew in my heart that she did not need the prayer. She was already healed through the regular sacramental approach to healing carried on for thirty years by the great and gentle saint of the church, Father John Hope. That church was full of the power of the Lord! One felt it amid the incense and candles (for Father John loved all these signs of God’s presence) and one felt it even more through the love that pulsed through the church so that all were welcome there, not only those dressed in their Sunday best but also all Father John’s friends from prison and reform school and the darkest alleys among the streets.”

The author Kylie Tennant, a long-standing friend of Hope, wrote of him: “He was a type of medieval churchman, a big handsome man with great spiritual powers. He also had a loveable set of whims and kinks. ... He was too well known at Long Bay [Gaol], where the ladies of the street had on one occasion told a visiting parson: 'Oh no, we're all Father Hope’s People. We go to Christ Church St Laurence.'”

== Retirement and death ==
Hope retired, after 39 years at Christ Church St Laurence, on 30 April 1964.

Never one to be concerned with personal wealth (he gave a house, "Tranby", in Glebe to the Aboriginal Co-operative College), his parish established an endowment to support his retirement. After his death, the John Hope Memorial Fund supported theological training in Papua New Guinea. The Archbishop of Sydney and his assistant bishops attended Hope's solemn requiem and the homeless men of the city “pleaded for a last look at his face”.
