= Anglican Bishop of Gippsland =

Bishop of Gippsland
- Bishopric

anglican
- Coat of arms of the Diocese
- Incumbent: Richard Treloar since 18 August 2018
- Style: The Right Reverend

Location
- Country: Australia
- Ecclesiastical province: Victoria
- Residence: Bishopscourt, Sale

Information
- First holder: Arthur Pain
- Denomination: Anglicanism
- Established: 10 July 1902
- Diocese: Gippsland
- Cathedral: St Paul's Cathedral, Sale

Website
- Diocese of Gippsland

The Bishop of Gippsland is the diocesan bishop of the Anglican Diocese of Gippsland, Australia.

== List of Bishops of Gippsland ==
Bishops of Gippsland
No	From	Until	Incumbent	Notes
1	1902	1917	Arthur Pain	Previously a canon of St Andrew's Cathedral, Sydney; installed 10 July 1902.
2	1917	1942	George Cranswick	
3	1942	1954	Donald Blackwood MC VD	Previously Archdeacon of Hobart.
4	1955	1958	Edwin Davidson	Died in office.
5	1959	1974	David Garnsey	Previously canon of St Saviour's Cathedral, Goulburn, and headmaster of Canberra Grammar School.
6	1975	1980	Graham Delbridge	Previously an archdeacon and senior chaplain to the Primate of Australia, and then a coadjutor bishop in the Diocese of Sydney; died in office.
7	1980	1987	Neville Chynoweth AM	Previously Assistant Bishop of Canberra and Goulburn.
8	1987	1994	Colin Sheumack	Previously Archdeacon of Bendigo and then Dean of Bathurst.
9	1994	2001	Arthur Jones	Previously Dean of Sale.
10	2001	2005	Jeffrey Driver	Translated to Adelaide.
11	2006	2014	John McIntyre	Died in office.
12	2015	2017	Kay Goldsworthy AO	Previously Assistant Bishop of Perth; translated to Perth becoming Archbishop of Perth and Metropolitan of Western Australia
13	2018	present	Richard Treloar	Installed 18 August 2018.
