= Susanna Pain =

Australian Anglican priest

The Very Reverend Susanna Pain

Dean, Anglican Diocese of Sale
- In office 2016–2021
- Preceded by: Steven P. Clarke
- Succeeded by: Keren Terpstra
- Title: Dean

Personal life
- Known for: One of first women Anglican priests, first woman Dean of Gippsland, spiritual retreats, contemplative prayer, creative and performance arts
- Occupation: Priest, Spiritual Director

Religious life
- Religion: Christian
- Denomination: Anglican Church of Australia
- Ordination: Priest 1992

Susanna Pain (Sue Pain, Susanna Leigh Pain; born 1957) is an Australian Anglican priest, former Dean of St Paul's Anglican Cathedral, Sale in Victoria, Australia and spiritual director. She was one of the first women ordained as an Anglican priest in Australia in 1992, one of the five women ordained in Adelaide, and the first female dean of St Paul's, Diocese of Gippsland. The features of her ministry have been pastoral care, leading spiritual retreats and contemplative prayer, and encouraging use of the creative and performance arts for worship.

== Personal life, education and early career ==
Pain was born in Cowra, New South Wales. She is a great-granddaughter of Arthur Pain, first bishop of the diocese of Gippsland and his wife, Annie Bisdee Pain (Thorne). Pain is married to Nikolai Blaskow who is an Anglican priest, teacher and chaplain; the couple are described as being a team and having a "shared ministry".

Pain obtained a Bachelor of Science, Australian National University in 1978; Bachelor of Social Work, La Trobe University in 1981; Bachelor of Theology, Australian College of Theology in 1989; Diploma of Remedial Massage in 2006; and a Graduate Diploma of Pastoral Supervision in 2014. Before entering the ministry she worked as a social worker in adoptions and foster care, in hospitals and with migrants and refugees. In the early 1990s she co-founded InterPlay® Australia, a community arts practice with Rod Pattenden and Trish Watts.

== Ministry ==
Pain studied theology at St Mark's National Theological College, Canberra and was ordained as a deacon in the Diocese of Canberra and Goulburn in 1989 and appointed as Assistant Curate, Holy Covenant Anglican Church, Jamison, Canberra from 1990 to 1992.

=== Ordination as priest ===
In 1990 Owen Dowling, Bishop of Canberra and Goulburn, announced he would ordain a group of women deacons as priests. Press coverage showed Pain with the other women ordinands surrounding and supporting Dowling. However, by the date of the ordination service in February 1992, while the ordinands were on retreat, a civil court injunction had been obtained to stop the ordination. The ordination ceremony proceeded and the 11 women deacons, including Pain, affirmed their commitment to become priests and were affirmed by the congregation, then returned to their seats while the male deacons were ordained. The Canberra Times ran a photo showing Pain in distress after the "non-ordination" ceremony. The next day Pain moved to Adelaide to take up a position as Deacon-in-Charge at Emmanuel Anglican church, Wayville where she preached and undertook all the duties of a priest except for blessing and serving the eucharist. On 5 December 1992 Archbishop Ian George ordained Pain as a priest along with Joan Claring-Bould, Flo Monahan (Walters), Sister Juliana CI (Community of the Incarnation) and Susan Straub.

=== Priest ===
==== 1992–1998 ====
From 1992 to 1998 Pain was Priest-in-Charge at the church in Wayville where she had served as Deacon-in-Charge. During that time she also worked as Pastoral Chaplain, St Barnabas College, Adelaide from 1996 to 1997. She was elected to the Social Responsibilities Commission of the Standing Committee of General Synod. While at Wayville, Pain wrote about her work as a priest: "It is a privilege to stand alongside men and women in the crisis time of their lives, baptising, marrying, burying, finding ways to express in ritual the pain of divorce, the joy of a new home or a new relationship, listening, teaching, facilitating and learning. I stay in the church because of this. Church is a gathering place for broken people, people searching, hopeful people, real people, and through them and with them I get a sense of God's presence. And by being there we make a difference."

In 1994 South Australia celebrated the centenary of women's suffrage in that state. Pain led an ecumenical service at St Peter's Cathedral on 11 February which included a dramatised conversation between Mary Lee and Catherine Helen Spence (South Australian suffragists) and a litany honouring the wisdom and struggles of women. The service was organised with other clergy, Elizabeth McWhae and Catie Inches-Ogden and the guest of honour was then Governor of South Australia, Dame Roma Mitchell. In October 1994 along with the four other women made priests in 1992, Pain was awarded the University Medal by Flinders University to acknowledge their pioneering role. To celebrate the 1992 ordinations, the Movement for the Ordination of Women ran a photo in its newsletter of Pain laughing with joy (originally from Sunday Mail, Adelaide).

In 1997 with Philip Carter, Director of the Julian Centre and the Ministry in Spirituality, Pain hosted and led a "retreat in daily life" attended by people from four parishes including Pain's Wayville congregants. That year with Laura Stephenson and Steve Ashley, Pain organised a conference, "Out of Bounds: Spirituality, the Arts and Culture" at the Lion Arts Centre.

==== 1998–2002 ====
In 1998 Pain moved to Sydney to take up the position of Assistant Minister, St James', King Street, Sydney where she served until 2002 and also as Chaplain at Sydney Hospital. The Anglican Diocese of Sydney does not ordain women as priests and women ordained elsewhere are not recognised as priests in the Anglican diocese of Sydney. As Pain was regarded as a deacon by the Sydney Anglican hierarchy she could not preside over the eucharist.

==== 2002–2015 ====
From 2002 to 2004 Pain was Rector of St John's Cowra, the town of her birth in the Anglican Diocese of Bathurst.

From 2006 to 2014 she returned as Rector to Holy Covenant Anglican Church in Canberra where she had first worked as a deacon and assistant curate. While there she oversaw the employment of a Holistic Care Nurse, Youth Worker, Children's Worker, and the establishment of a Day Hospice. Pain was also Area Dean of Belconnen from 2008 to 2009 and Archdeacon, Canberra North from 2009 to 2010. In 2007 Pain was invited to open the St Paul's deanery residence at Sale which had been newly built from the Annie Pain Memorial Kindergarten Hall, named after her great-grandmother.

In 2014 Pain was Spiritual Director, Pastoral Supervisor and Retreat Leader at The Well in Lyneham, Canberra then in 2015 she became associate director, Liturgy, Arts and Spiritual Care at the Australian Centre for Christianity and Culture.

=== Dean ===
==== 2016–2021 ====
Pain was installed as the 23rd Dean of St Paul's Cathedral in Sale on 3 September 2016 by Kay Goldsworthy, then Bishop of Gippsland. The service was attended by four past deans of Sale as well as three deans of surrounding dioceses, and included liturgical dance and a reading from Corinthians by Pain's husband, Nikolai Blaskow. Pain became the first woman Dean of the cathedral for the diocese where her great-grandfather was enthroned as the first bishop in 1902.

She was interviewed in 2020 by the new Bishop Richard Treloar about the role of a dean, her family connections with the diocese, the meditation and prayer services she led online and her ordination to the priesthood where she referred to the photo of her distress after the "non-ordination" in February 1992.

During the 2020 and 2021 COVID lockdowns in Victoria when people could not attend in-person church, Pain held services online. She also gave an online talk about her ancestor, former Bishop Arthur Pain and his wife Annie and about living in the deanery which she had dedicated in 2007.

Pain hosted creative festivals, concerts and workshops in the cathedral and the diocese, founded the St Paul's Cathedral Sale Music Foundation Trust, introduced Messy Church (family-oriented services) into the cathedral and led spiritual and prayer retreats and online morning meditations.

=== Later ministry ===
==== 2022- ====
Pain is Senior Associate: Community, Spiritual Care and the Arts at Benedictus contemplative church, an independent ecumenical church community with a practice of silent contemplative prayer. She continues to lead spiritual retreats and arts workshops.

== See also ==
- Ordination of women in the Anglican communion
