= St Paul's Cathedral, Sale =

Church building in Victoria, Australia

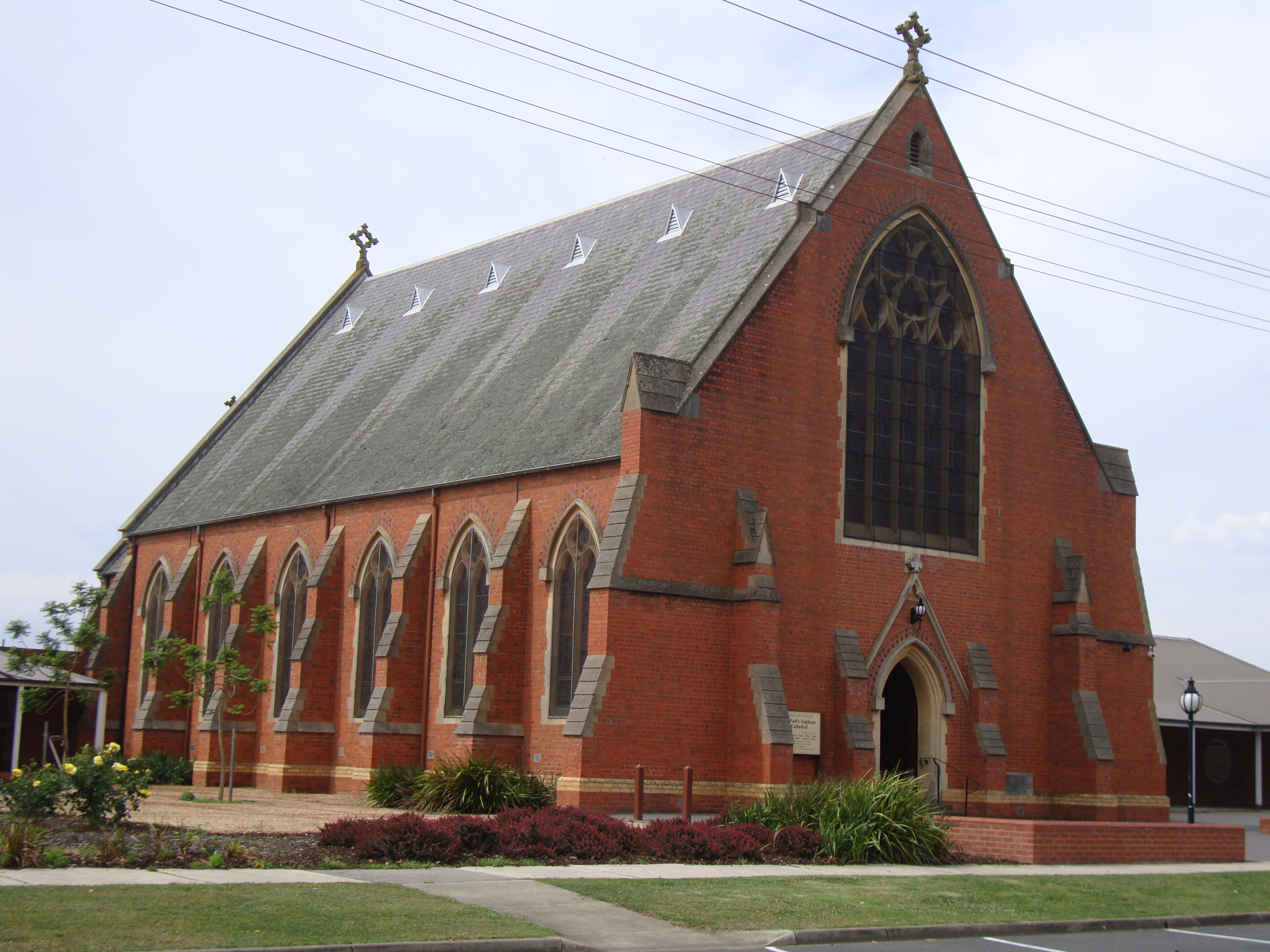
- St Paul's Cathedral, Sale
- 38°06′24″S 147°04′18″E
- Country: Australia
- Denomination: Anglican
- Website: stpaulssale.org.au

History
- Status: Cathedral

Architecture
- Architect: Nathaniel Billing
- Architectural type: Church
- Style: Gothic Revival
- Years built: 1884

Specifications
- Materials: Red brick; slate

Administration
- Diocese: Gippsland

Clergy
- Bishop: Richard Treloar
- Dean: Keren Terpstra

St Paul's Cathedral is an Australian Anglican cathedral church located in Sale, Victoria. The cathedral is the mother church of the Diocese of Gippsland and is the seat of the Bishop of Gippsland, currently Richard Treloar.

== Design ==
The cathedral building, built in 1884 to a design by Nathaniel Billing, is a double storey building with a rectangular footprint and is constructed of red brick and slate roofing.

The cathedral's interior is decorated in a Gothic Revival style expressing a high church liturgy. The walls are of white rendered plaster with Oregon roof buttressing. Above the sanctuary is the "great western window" depicting the Sermon on the Mount and several other windows include St Paul's vision of the Macedonian and the diocese's coat of arms line the nave. Within the nave are a Lady chapel, a bishop's chapel and an honour roll.

== Deans of Sale ==
The cathedral is the mother church of a diocese. The dean is the chief resident cleric of a cathedral or other collegiate church and the head of the chapter of canons. The dean is usually also rector or incumbent of the parish. This is a list of the deans of Sale.

- Joseph Donald Sansom 1943-1949 (installed as dean in 1949, previously a canon)
- Clarence Barton Alexander 1950-1973
- Ray. E. Elliot 1974-1977
- Edward (Ted) G. Gibson 1978-1985
- Allan T. Huggins 1985-1989
- Arthur L. V. Jones 1989-1994
- Graeme L. MacRobb 1995-1999
- K. Neil Hicks 1999-2001
- Brian A. Turner 2002-2010
- Donald G. Saines 2010-2013
- Steven P. Clarke 2013-2015
- Susanna Leigh Pain 2016-2021
- Keren Terpstra 2022-
