= Arthur Jones (bishop) =

Australian Anglican bishop (1934–2021)

Arthur Lucas Vivian Jones OAM (11 December 1934 - 11 July 2021) was an Australian Anglican bishop. He was the 9th Bishop of Gippsland from 1994 to 2001.

Jones was educated at St John's College, Morpeth, and Deakin University and ordained in 1967.

His first post was as a curate at Holy Trinity, Orange, after which he was a missionary in Panama. He was later vicar of Corangamite, rector of Woy Woy and dean of St Paul's Cathedral, Sale, Victoria, before his ordination to the episcopate. He was awarded an Order of Australia medal in 2006. The marriage ended in divorce and he then married Claudette.

He died in 2021, aged 86.

Anglican Communion titles
Preceded by Colin Sheumack	Bishop of Gippsland; 1994–2001	Succeeded by Jeffrey Driver
