= Bishop of Gippsland =

Bishop of Gippsland may refer to:

- Anglican Bishop of Gippsland
- Bishop of the Roman Catholic Diocese of Sale
