= Broughton Publishing =

- Parent company: Anglican Church of Australia
- Founded: 2001
- Country of origin: Australia
- Headquarters location: Mulgrave, Victoria
- Distribution: Garratt Publishing
- Publication types: Books
- Official website: www.broughtonpublishing.com.au

Broughton Publishing was established in 2001 by the Anglican Church of Australia as its national publishing arm. It is named after the Right Reverend William Grant Broughton, who was consecrated as the first Bishop of Australia in 1836.

Broughton publishes liturgical materials, such as the Anglican lectionary and prayer book, devotional materials, and other books related to the Anglican Church of Australia.
