= John McIntyre (bishop of Gippsland) =

The Right Reverend John McIntyre
- Bishop of Gippsland
- Church: Anglican Church of Australia
- Diocese: Gippsland
- Installed: 18 February 2006
- Term ended: 6 June 2014
- Predecessor: Jeffrey Driver
- Successor: Kay Goldsworthy

Orders
- Consecration: 11 February 2006

Personal details
- Born: John Charles McIntyre; 27 October 1951 Sydney, New South Wales
- Died: 6 June 2014 (aged 62)
- Denomination: Anglican
- Residence: Sale, Victoria

John Charles McIntyre (27 October 1951 – 6 June 2014) was an Australian Anglican bishop. He was the 11th bishop of the Diocese of Gippsland in south-east Victoria.

McIntyre was ordained as a bishop on 11 February 2006 and installed as Bishop of Gippsland at St Paul's Cathedral in Sale on 18 February 2006. Prior to this, he was the rector of the South Sydney parish in the Anglican Diocese of Sydney for 15 years.

McIntyre was known to be an "alternative voice" in the Anglican Church of Australia. While working in the Sydney diocese, he often took a stance against the more conservative attitudes of the diocesan authorities there, arguing for the ordination of women and homosexual rights within the church.

Another of McIntyre's missions throughout his ministry was to support the underprivileged, which is what drew him initially to urban ministry and which continued to influence his work as a bishop in the rural Gippsland diocese. In particular, he focused much of his energy on Indigenous Australians and initiated ministries to benefit local Indigenous communities both within his previous community of Redfern and Waterloo and then in Gippsland.

== Sources ==
- Baird, Julia (20 October 2005). "Numbers rule as Team Sydney muscles up". smh.com.au.
- Collins, Madeleine, Redfern's Pastor Takes Leap of Faith, 18 October 2005
- Muston, Philip, Anglican Diocese of Gippsland Press Release: The Reverend John McIntyre Elected Bishop of Gippsland, 2005
- Rodgers, Margaret, Anglican Community Soon to Divide?, 28 October 2003

Anglican Communion titles
Preceded by Jeffrey Driver	Bishop of Gippsland; 2006–2014	Succeeded by Kay Goldsworthy
