= Anglican Diocese of Gippsland =

Diocese of the Anglican Church of Australia

Coordinates: 38°6′24″S 147°4′18″E

Diocese of Gippsland
- Coat of arms

Location
- Ecclesiastical province: Victoria

Information
- Rite: Anglican
- Cathedral: St Paul's Cathedral, Sale

Website
- Diocese of Gippsland

Diocese of Gippsland Arms: Stained Glass at Bishop's residence

The Diocese of Gippsland is a diocese of the Anglican Church of Australia, founded in 1902. It is situated in the Gippsland region of the state of Victoria, Australia and covers most of the eastern part of the state. The diocesan cathedral is St Paul's Cathedral, Sale. The current Bishop of Gippsland, installed on 18 August 2018, is Richard Treloar.

== History ==
The Diocese of Gippsland was created after a movement to divide the Diocese of Melbourne, the oldest Anglican diocese in Victoria, established in 1847. Talk began of this as early as 1885 and in 1900 a bill was passed to create the Diocese of Sandhurst-Beechworth. Debate continued after this decision and eventually led to another bill in 1901, with which three new dioceses were created. Along with Ballarat and Wangaratta, the Diocese of Gippsland came into existence in the following year. The bishops of each of these dioceses were elected by a body made up of the Bishop of Melbourne, four members of the Melbourne Bishopric Election Board, four clergy from the area in question and four laity. Arthur Pain was chosen to be the first to preside over the Diocese of Gippsland. He was consecrated as a bishop at St Andrew's Cathedral in Sydney, having previously ministered at St John's Darlinghurst in Sydney. He was then installed as Bishop of Gippsland in the Cathedral of St Paul in Gippsland on 10 July 1902.

== Bishops ==
Bishops of Gippsland
No	From	Until	Incumbent	Notes
1	1902	1917	Arthur Pain	Previously a canon of St Andrew's Cathedral, Sydney; installed 10 July 1902.
2	1917	1942	George Cranswick	
3	1942	1954	Donald Blackwood MC VD	Previously Archdeacon of Hobart.
4	1955	1958	Edwin Davidson	Died in office.
5	1959	1974	David Garnsey	Previously canon of St Saviour's Cathedral, Goulburn, and headmaster of Canberra Grammar School.
6	1975	1980	Graham Delbridge	Previously an archdeacon and senior chaplain to the Primate of Australia, and then a coadjutor bishop in the Diocese of Sydney; died in office.
7	1980	1987	Neville Chynoweth AM	Previously Assistant Bishop of Canberra and Goulburn.
8	1987	1994	Colin Sheumack	Previously Archdeacon of Bendigo and then Dean of Bathurst.
9	1994	2001	Arthur Jones	Previously Dean of Sale.
10	2001	2005	Jeffrey Driver	Translated to Adelaide.
11	2006	2014	John McIntyre	Died in office.
12	2015	2017	Kay Goldsworthy AO	Previously Assistant Bishop of Perth; translated to Perth becoming Archbishop of Perth and Metropolitan of Western Australia
13	2018	present	Richard Treloar	Installed 18 August 2018.

== Facilities ==
The cathedral church of the diocese is the Cathedral Church of St Paul, Sale. The diocese also has two affiliated schools, Gippsland Grammar School and St Paul's Anglican Grammar School, Warragul.

== Companion diocese ==
- The Diocese of Gahini in the Anglican Church of Rwanda

== Sources ==
- H.W. Nunn: A Short History of the Church of England in Victoria 1847-1947 (1947)
- Albert E. Clarke: The Church of our Fathers
- I. T. Maddern: Light and Life A history of the Anglican Church in Gippsland, Diocese of Gippsland website
