= Jeffrey Driver =

Australian Anglican bishop

The Right Reverend Jeffrey Driver
- Archbishop of Adelaide
- Province: South Australia
- Diocese: Adelaide
- Installed: 2005
- Term ended: 2016
- Predecessor: Ian George
- Successor: Geoffrey Smith
- Other post: Bishop of Gippsland

Orders
- Ordination: 1977
- Consecration: 2001

Personal details
- Born: Jeffrey William Driver; 6 October 1951 (age 75)

Jeffrey William Driver (born 6 October 1951) is a retired Australian Anglican bishop. He is the former Archbishop of Adelaide and Metropolitan of South Australia in the Anglican Church of Australia.

== Early life ==
Driver grew up in the New South Wales country town of Cowra. His theological education was undertaken through the Australian College of Theology. After a short career as a newspaper journalist he was ordained in 1977 and began his career as an assistant curate in Bathurst. He held incumbencies at Mid-Richmond and Jamison and was later Archdeacon of Young, New South Wales and also Rector of the parish of St Paul's Manuka in Canberra. Driver was Executive Director of St Mark's National Theological Centre in Canberra from 1995 to 1997, and founding Head of Charles Sturt University's School of Theology. In 2001, Driver was consecrated and appointed Bishop of Gippsland in eastern Victoria, a position he held until his translation to Adelaide in 2005.

Driver holds a PhD from Charles Sturt University, MTh. from the Sydney College of Divinity, as well as Scholar and Licentiate in Theology from the Australian College of Theology.

Driver continues to lecture and write on biblical studies and Anglican ecclesiology, and has been closely involved with the work of the Anglican Church's caring body, Anglicare, in a number of dioceses. He attended the Global South Fourth Encounter that took place in Singapore, on 19–23 April 2010.

On 10 April 2016, Driver announced that he would retire in August 2016. It was announced in December 2016 that his successor would be Geoffrey Smith, the assistant bishop, general manager and registrar of the Diocese of Brisbane.

In retirement, Driver has been acting principal of Newton Theological College in Papua New Guinea.

Styles of Jeffrey Driver
- Reference style: The Right Reverend
- Religious style: Archbishop

Anglican Communion titles
Preceded by Arthur Jones	Bishop of Gippsland; 2001–2005	Succeeded by John McIntyre
Preceded by Ian George	Archbishop of Adelaide; 2005–2016	Succeeded by Geoffrey Smith
