= Ian George =

Australian Anglican bishop (1934–2019)

The Most Reverend Ian George AO
- Archbishop of Adelaide
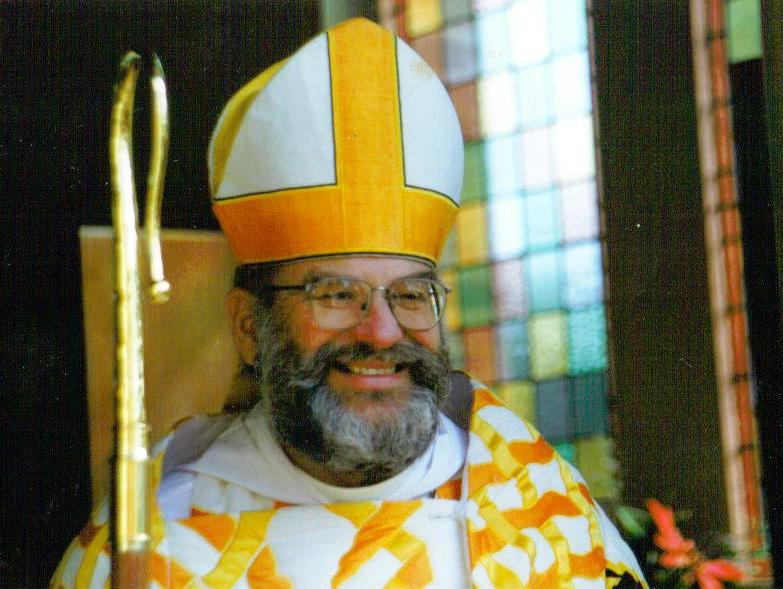
- Archbishop George in 1995
- Church: Anglican Church of Australia
- Province: Province of South Australia
- Diocese: Adelaide
- Installed: 29 June 1991
- Term ended: 11 June 2004
- Predecessor: Keith Rayner
- Successor: Jeffrey Driver
- Other posts: Assistant bishop, Canberra and Goulburn (1989–1991); Archdeacon of Canberra (1981–1989); Dean of Brisbane (1973–1981)

Orders
- Ordination: 1964 (as priest)
- Consecration: 28 October 1989

Personal details
- Born: Ian Gordon Combe George; 12 August 1934 Adelaide, South Australia, Australia
- Died: 28 January 2019 (aged 84) Melbourne, Victoria, Australia
- Denomination: Anglicanism
- Spouse: Barbara
- Children: 2

Ian Gordon Combe George AO (12 August 1934 – 28 January 2019) was an Australian Anglican bishop. He was the third Archbishop of Adelaide and Metropolitan of South Australia from 1991 to 2004.

== Early life and education ==
George was educated at St Peter's College, Adelaide and the University of Adelaide.

== Career ==
After an earlier career as a lawyer, he was ordained a priest in 1964. He held curacies at St Thomas's Mamaroneck and St David's Burnside; and was then priest in charge at St Barbara's Woomera. After this he was a chaplain and lecturer in history at the University of Western Australia. He was Dean of Brisbane from 1973 to 1981 when he became Archdeacon of Canberra. In 1989, he was appointed an assistant bishop of the diocese, consecrated on 28 October; and in 1991 was translated to Adelaide.

George ordained five women to the priesthood on 5 December 1992 at St Peter's Cathedral in Adelaide.

George was first recognised as a Member of the Order of Australia (AM) in the 1989 Australia Day Honours.

In the 2001 Australia Day Honours, George was further recognised as an Officer of the Order of Australia (AO) "for service to the Anglican Church, ecumenism and to the community through engagement in social policy issues and international relief work." His passion for refugees was a hallmark of his social engagement, in particular during his time as Archbishop of Adelaide.

George was awarded the Centenary Medal on 1 January 2001 for his "service to Australian society through the Anglican Church of Australia".

A keen supporter of the arts, especially the visual arts, George loved to make links between the great Christian themes of forgiveness, redemption and resurrection and the great masters. His Good Friday tours of the Art Gallery of South Australia were one way he expressed his love of the arts. He was co-author with painter David Dridan in the publication Artists of the Fleurieu (2008).

In 2004, George resigned from the role of archbishop due to mishandling of sex abuse allegations. This was just 10 weeks before he was due to retire. Later, he admitted he should have listened to the priest who blew the whistle on the Brandenburg sex-abuse scandal that engulfed the church and cost him his job. At the Royal Commission into Child Sexual Abuse in January 2015 he described this as a "serious error in judgement".

George moved to Melbourne following his resignation as Archbishop of Adelaide. He suffered a stroke in late 2018, and another in early 2019. He died at The Alfred Hospital two weeks later, on 28 January 2019.

== Personal life ==
George was married to Barbara George.

Anglican Communion titles
Preceded by Keith Rayner	Archbishop of Adelaide; 1991–2004	Succeeded by Jeffrey Driver
