= Neville Chynoweth =

Neville James Chynoweth AM (3 October 1922 – 11 August 2011) was the seventh Bishop of Gippsland from 1980 to 1987.

Chynoweth was educated at Manly High School, Moore Theological College (ThL (Hons) in 1949 and a BD in 1969) and the University of Sydney, where he received an MA (1957). He was ordained in 1950, serving a curacy at St Michael's Sydney, Rector of Kangaroo Valley (1951–52) and then a chaplain of the Royal Prince Alfred Hospital. From 1954 to 1963 he was Rector of St John's Dee Why and then, from 1963 to 1966, St Anne's Strathfield. In 1966 his ministry took him to Canberra, where he was Rector of All Saints Ainslie, Australian Capital Territory (1966–71) and then St Paul's, Manuka (1971–74). He was appointed archdeacon in 1973.

In 1974 he was consecrated assistant bishop in the Anglican Diocese of Canberra and Goulburn, serving until 1980 when he was translated as bishop to the Diocese of Gippsland (1980–87). He retired in 1987 (aged 65) and served as an honorary assistant bishop in Canberra and Goulburn from 1991 to 2004. He was made a Member of the Order of Australia (AM) in the 1996 Queen's Birthday Honours.

Anglican Communion titles
Preceded by Graham Richard Delbridge	Bishop of Gippsland; 1980–1987	Succeeded by Colin Davies Sheumack
