= Jo Inkpin =

Australia's first openly transgender Anglican priest

Orders
- Ordination: 1986 (deacon); 1987 (priest)

Personal details
- Born: England
- Denomination: Church of England (until 2000); Anglican Church of Australia (2000–2021); Uniting Church in Australia (2021–present)
- Spouse: Penny Jones
- Education: Durham University

Josephine McDonnell Inkpin is an Australian priest and activist. Currently a minister of the Uniting Church in Australia, she was previously a member of the Anglican Church of Australia and was the church's first openly transgender priest.

== Early life and education ==
Inkpin was born in England. She completed a PhD in theology at Durham University in 1996, with a thesis titled "Combatting the 'Sin of Self-Sacrifice'?: Christian Feminism in the Women's Suffrage Struggle: 1903–1918".

== Career ==
Inkpin taught history and theology at Oxford University. She was ordained a deacon in 1986 and a priest in 1987. She has noted that the role of priest allowed her to "exist in a way between sexes – in previous centuries they called it the third sex".

Inkpin and her wife Penny served in the Church of England before moving to Australia.

== Transition ==
Inkpin made a public statement in July 2017 announcing her transition. At this time she was aged in her fifties and had felt that she was a woman for many years. She chose the name "Josephine" in honour of Josephine Butler, an Anglican saint and theologian.

The Archbishop of Brisbane supported her transition and encouraged her to continue with her ministry. Other parts of the church, including the Sydney Anglican Diocese, were not as supportive.

In March 2021, Inkpin was inducted at Pitt Street Uniting Church, Sydney. This made her the first openly transgender person appointed within a mainstream church in Australia. On 4 May 2021, local member of parliament Alex Greenwich issued a community recognition statement congratulating Inkpin on her appointment, noting that Inkpin and Jones were passionate, welcoming and focused on inclusion within the church.

== Activism ==
Inkpin was the co-chair of the Anglican Church Southern Queensland Reconciliation Action Plan Working Group. She was also coordinator of the Rainbow Faith project.

Inkpin was featured on the Queensland State Library podcast "Dangerous Women".

== Personal life ==
Inkpin is married to Penny Jones, also an Anglican priest. They met in the early 1980s while they were both studying theology at Ripon College, Cuddesdon. They have twin daughters and are also grandparents. In July 2020 they celebrated their 35th wedding anniversary and reaffirmed their vows at St John's Cathedral, Brisbane.

== Writing ==
Inkpin is the author of Trans Spirit Flourishing, a website with resources for transgender Christians.

She has two blogs – Blessed Imp and Pen and Ink Reflections, written with her wife, Penny.

=== Books ===
- Inkpin, Jo (2015). Paynter, Neil (ed.). Building a Model City of Peace and Harmony Down Under. Glasgow: Wild Goose Publications. ISBN 978-1849524285.
- Inkpin, Jo (2014). Leaves, Nigel (ed.). Encountering God in Difference. Morning Star Publishing. ISBN 978-1498230957.

=== Journal articles and other publications ===
- Inkpin, Jo (2016). "From Bishops to Bunya Nuts: bringing Australian Reconciliation, Ecology and Mission together". Australian Association of Mission Studies. 10 (2).
- Inkpin, Jo (2 November 2009). "Review of James W. Jones, Blood that Cries Out from the Earth: The Psychology of Religious Violence". Journal of Anglican Studies. 7 (2).
- Inkpin, Jo (2008). "Nei Neiwa Yi Yu Gali: Towards a Whole Body Theology of Reconciliation". Australian Association of Mission Studies.
- Inkpin, Jo (February 2006). "The Lazarus Demand – Overcoming Indigenous Poverty: A Biblical Reflection on John Ch.11". Australian e-Journal of Theology.
