= Edwin Davidson =

Australian bishop (1899–1958)

Edwin John Davidson (12 February 1899 – 1 April 1958) was the 4th bishop of Gippsland in Victoria, Australia from 1955 until his death in 1958.

Educated at the University of Sydney, he was ordained in 1926. From then until 1930 he was a Toc H Chaplain. Later he was a Residentiary Canon firstly at Bathurst and later (until his elevation to the episcopate) Rector of St James' Church, Sydney (1938-55).

== Notes ==
Religious titles
Preceded by Donald Burns Blackwood	Bishop of Gippsland; 1955–1958	Succeeded by David Arthur Garnsey
