= Graham Delbridge =

Australian bishop

Graham Richard Delbridge (22 May 1917 – 8 June 1980) was the sixth bishop of the Diocese of Gippsland in Australia from 1974 to 1980.

Delbridge was born on 22 May 1917. He was educated at Moore College.

He became Director of Youth Work in the Anglican Diocese of Sydney and held incumbencies at Holy Trinity Church, Adelaide, and St Matthew's Manly.

From 1963 he was an archdeacon and senior chaplain to the Primate of Australia, and in 1969 he became a coadjutor bishop in the Diocese of Sydney: he was consecrated a bishop on 8 April at St Andrew's Cathedral, Sydney.

From 1973 he was a member of the Anglican-Orthodox Joint Doctrinal Commission, and he supported ecumenical endeavours in Australia.

On 8 June 1980 he and his 21-year-old daughter Judy were killed in a motoring accident near Sale.

Anglican Communion titles
Preceded by David Arthur Garnsey	Bishop of Gippsland; 1974–1980	Succeeded by Neville James Chynoweth
