= Arthur Pain =

Australian bishop (1841–1920)

Arthur Wellesley Pain (21 August 1841 – 14 May 1920) was an Anglican bishop and the first Bishop of Gippsland from 1902 until 1917.

Born in Felmersham and educated at St Catharine's College, Cambridge, he was ordained in 1866. He began his career as curate of Holbrook, Suffolk before emigrating to Australia two years later as incumbent of Cobbitty, New South Wales. His next appointment was as Vicar of Narellan, NSW then Rural Dean of Camden. In 1883 he was appointed rector of St. John's, Darlinghurst, in East Sydney, and in 1893 chaplain to Saumarez Smith, Bishop of Sydney. From 1897 he was canon of St. Andrew's Cathedral, Sydney.

It was announced in April 1902 that Pain would be appointed the first Bishop of Gippsland, and his ordination to the episcopate came when he was consecrated the following month.

He received the degree Doctor of Divinity from the University of Cambridge in February 1903.

== Notes ==
Church of England titles
| Preceded by Inaugural appointment | Bishop of Gippsland; 1902 –1917 | Succeeded by George Harvard Cranswick |
