= Donald Blackwood =

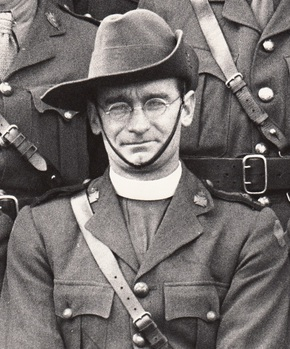

Donald Burns Blackwood MC (3 November 1884 – 25 June 1967) was the third bishop of Gippsland from 1942 to 1954.

Blackwood was educated at the University of Tasmania and ordained in 1908. From 1912 to 1920 he was a chaplain in the Australian Armed Forces. Later he held incumbencies at Latrobe and Cressy. Whilst incumbent of Cressy (1921-24), he was also Warden of St Wilfrid's Theological College, Cressy. In 1929 he was appointed archdeacon of Hobart, a position he held until his ordination to the episcopate.

Anglican Communion titles
Preceded by George Harvard Cranswick	Bishop of Gippsland; 1942–1955	Succeeded by Edwin John Davidson
