= Kay Goldsworthy =

Anglican Archbishop of Perth

The Most Reverend Kay Goldsworthy AO
- Archbishop of Perth
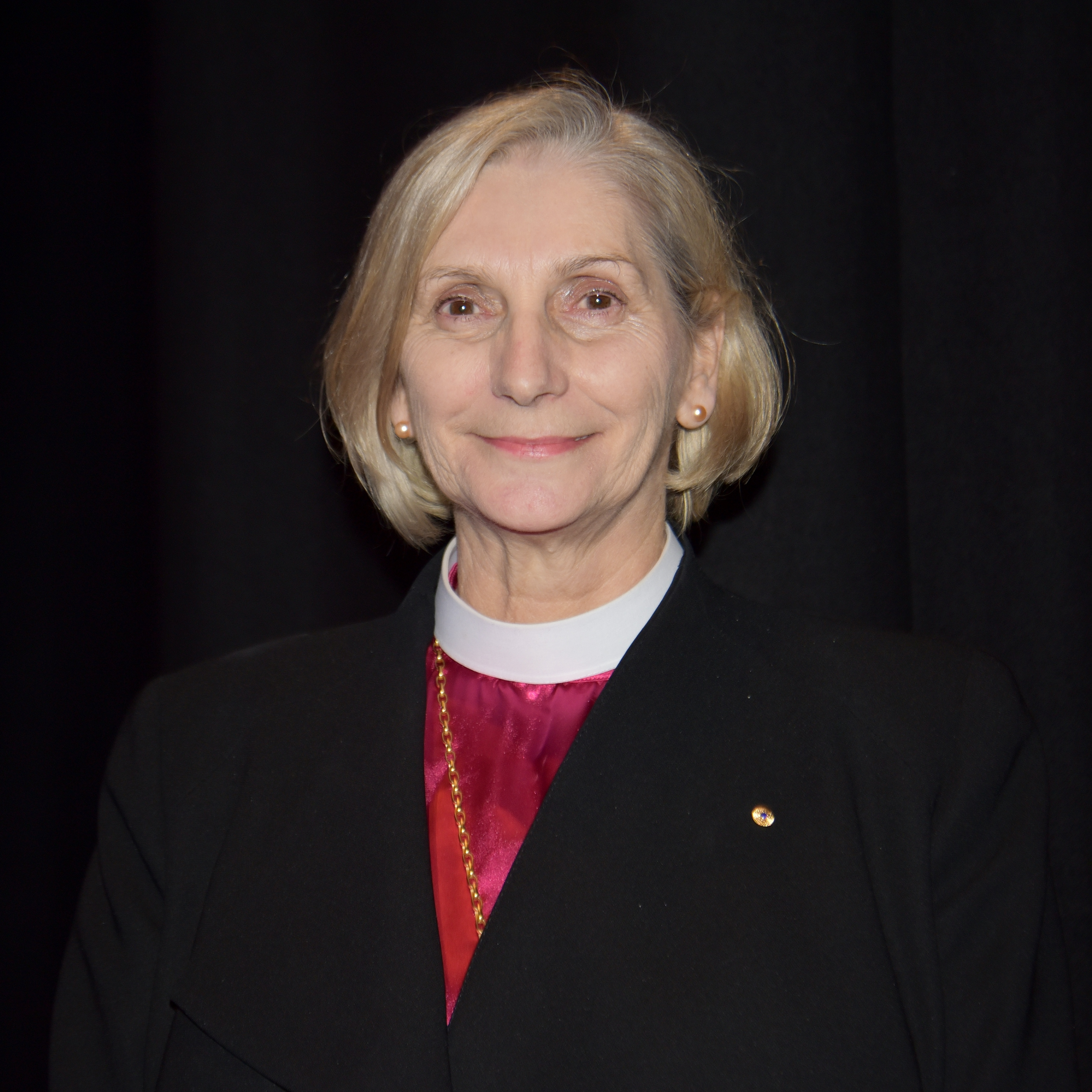
- Goldsworthy in 2019
- Church: Anglican Church of Australia
- Province: Western Australia
- Diocese: Perth
- Elected: 29 August 2017
- Installed: 10 February 2018
- Predecessor: Roger Herft
- Other post: Metropolitan of Western Australia (ex officio)
- Previous posts: Bishop of Gippsland; (2015–2017); Assistant Bishop in the Diocese of Perth; (2008–2014)

Orders
- Ordination: 9 February 1986 (as deacon) by David Penman; 7 March 1992 (as priest) by Peter Carnley
- Consecration: 22 May 2008 by Roger Herft

Personal details
- Born: Kay Maree Goldsworthy; 1956 (age 69–70) Melbourne, Victoria, Australia
- Denomination: Anglicanism
- Spouse: Jeri James
- Children: 2
- Education: Trinity College, Melbourne
- Coat of arms: Kay Goldsworthy's coat of arms

Kay Maree Goldsworthy AO (born 1956) is an Australian bishop of the Anglican Church of Australia. She is the current archbishop of Perth in the Province of Western Australia. Upon her installation as archbishop, on 10 February 2018, she became the first female archbishop in the Anglican Church of Australia. Previously, she served as diocesan bishop of the Diocese of Gippsland in the south-eastern Australian state of Victoria.

== Early life, education and ministry ==
Goldsworthy was born and raised in Melbourne, where she studied theology at Trinity College from 1980 to 1983. In 1986 she was ordained as one of the Anglican church's first female deacons in Australia and served as curate at parishes in Thomastown/Epping and Deer Park/St. Albans before moving to Western Australia to become school chaplain at Perth College in Mount Lawley. In 1992 she was ordained as one of a group of Australia's first female priests by the then archbishop, Peter Carnley. She served as rector of St David's parish, Applecross from 1995 to 2006. During this time she was appointed a canon of St George's Cathedral and subsequently Archdeacon of Fremantle. In 2007 she was appointed Archdeacon of Perth and the registrar of the Diocese of Perth.

== Ministry as bishop ==
In April 2008, Goldsworthy was chosen to become an assistant bishop in the Diocese of Perth by the archbishop, Roger Herft. She became the first woman to be consecrated as a bishop in the Anglican Church of Australia at St George's Cathedral, Perth, on 22 May 2008. In 2013 she became the first woman already consecrated as a bishop, and the second Anglican woman, to be on a nomination list for election as a diocesan bishop in Australia (the Bishop of Newcastle election being the first). On 11 December 2014 she was elected to become the diocesan bishop of the Diocese of Gippsland and was installed on 21 March 2015.

In the Australian 2017 Queen's Birthday Honours List, Goldsworthy was appointed an Officer of the Order of Australia (AO) for "distinguished service to religion through the Anglican Church of Australia, as a pioneer and role model for women, to church administration, and to pastoral care and equality".

In 2017 Goldsworthy was elected Archbishop of Perth and installed on 10 February 2018 as the archbishop and metropolitan of Western Australia.

She gave as her first priorities: properly responding to the Royal Commission into Institutional Responses to Child Sexual Abuse, ensuring those who had been abused were cared for, rebuilding trust in the church as a place of grace and healing, addressing violence against women and children in the community, supporting women in leadership positions and listening to the views of Anglicans in the Perth diocese.

== Views of other Anglicans ==
=== Women bishops ===
Women have served as Anglican bishops in a number of countries, including the United States, Canada and New Zealand, since 1989.

In September 2007, the Australian church's appellate tribunal ruled that there was no constitutional impediment to women becoming bishops, but agreed to defer any appointments until 2008. The report of the appellate tribunal considered the following questions:

Question 1: Is there anything in the Constitution which would now prevent the consecration of a woman in priest's orders as a bishop in this Church in a diocese which by ordinance has adopted the Law of the Church of England Clarification Canon 1992? Answer: As regards diocesan bishops: No, provided that the woman has been duly elected as the diocesan bishop and has had her election duly confirmed in accordance with the criteria for canonical fitness set out in s74(1) of the Constitution.

A subsequent bishops' conference, in Newcastle, New South Wales, in April 2008, cleared the way for the first consecration of a woman as a bishop in Australia.

Goldsworthy's appointment was opposed on conscientious grounds from some sections of the church, particularly in the Diocese of Sydney led by its then archbishop, Peter Jensen. The Sydney diocese indicated that if Goldsworthy visited in an official capacity she would be unable to perform any duties as a bishop and could only act as a deacon. David Mulready, then bishop of the Diocese of North West Australia, said "I come from a part of the Anglican Church that takes the Bible seriously and believes that the Bible prohibits what is about to happen ... I think it's novel, I think it's provocative, I think it's divisive and the archbishop knows all of that."

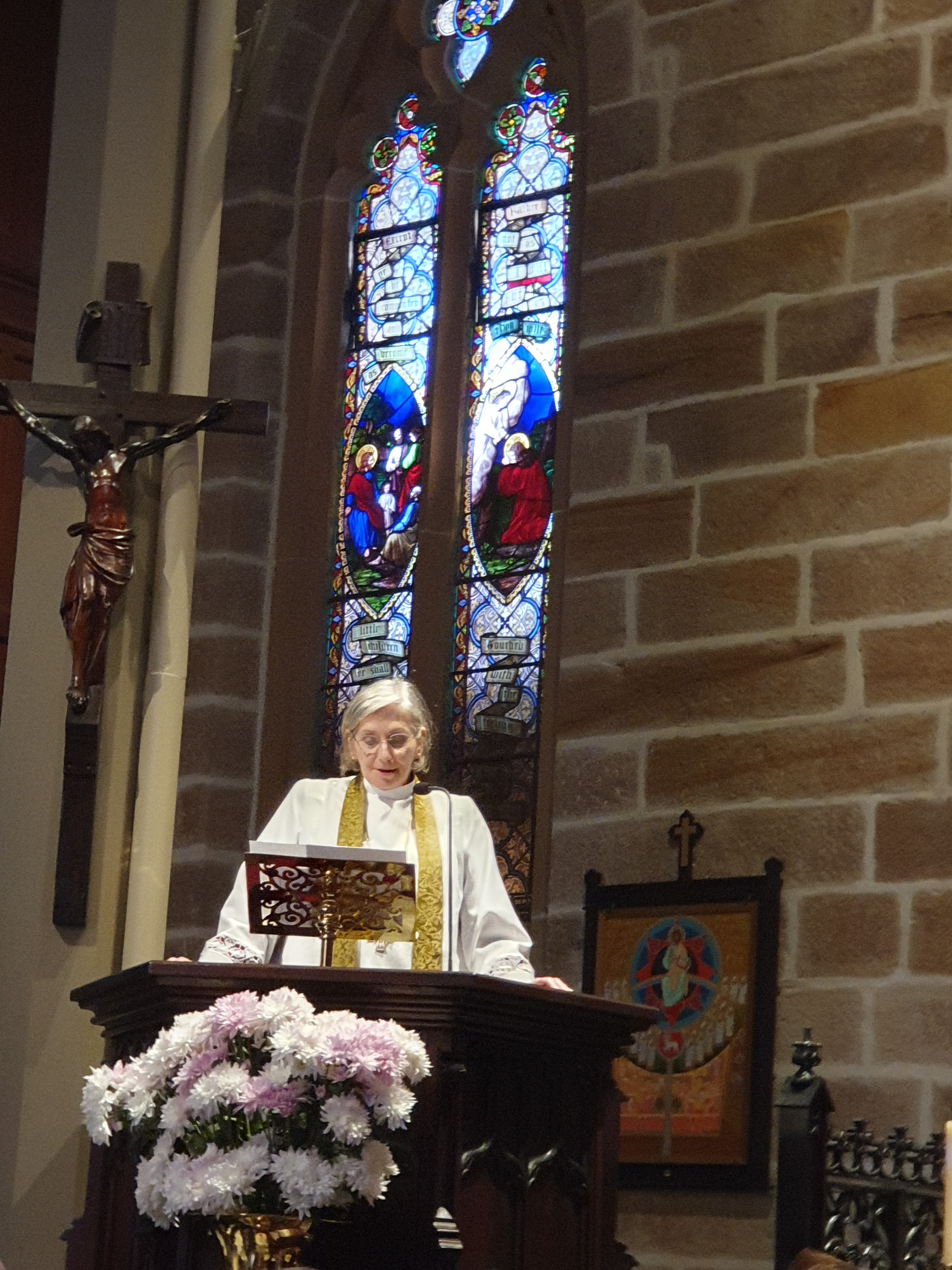
Archbishop Kay Goldsworthy preaching at Christ Church St Laurence

On 17 September 2023, as part of the Movement for the Ordination of Women 40th anniversary celebrations, Goldsworthy preached about God's grace and forgiveness at Christ Church St Laurence, Sydney, the first woman bishop to preach in an Anglican church in Sydney. In the lead up to the service, Julia Baird, journalist, former co-convenor of the Sydney Movement for the Ordination of Women, interviewed Goldsworthy and Michael Jensen on the current affairs program The Drum on 15 September and on 16 September published an article in the Sydney Morning Herald about the Sydney diocese views on the ordination of women as priests and its refusal to recognise Goldsworthy as a bishop in its diocese.

=== Same-sex relationships ===
Criticism of Goldsworthy's acceptance of people in same-sex relationships in the church has mainly come from the Diocese of Sydney. She has said that she supports an "inclusive" approach to same-sex marriage and voted in favour of same-sex marriage during Australia's plebiscite; however, she also stated that it was her personal view and not the official view of the church as an institution. In Perth she appointed two men to clerical positions who were in (separate) same-sex civil partnerships, both of whom committed to the Faithfulness in Service code (maintaining chastity in singleness and faithfulness in marriage). In 2022, during the Lambeth Conference, she signed a statement in support of LGBT+ people within the Anglican Communion.

== Family ==
Goldsworthy is married to Jeri James, and they have twin sons.

== See also ==
- Ordination of women in the Anglican Communion
- List of the first women ordained as priests in the Anglican Church of Australia in 1992

Anglican Communion titles
Preceded by John McIntyre	Bishop of Gippsland; 2015–2017	Succeeded by Richard Treloar
Preceded by Roger Herft	Archbishop of Perth; 2018–	Incumbent
