= George Cranswick =

Australian Anglican bishop (1882–1954)

George Harvard Cranswick (1882–1954) was the 2nd bishop of Gippsland from 1917 until 1942.

Educated at The King's School, Parramatta, and Sydney University, he was ordained in 1908. In a varied career he was acting vice-principal of Noble College, Masulipatam, headmaster of the CMS Bezwada, chairman of the Deccan District Church Council and rector of St Paul's, Chatswood before his elevation to the episcopate. After retiring from his diocese, he was chairman of the Australian Board of Missions from 1942 to 1949. He was an eminent author, and a strong advocate of racial equality.

He was married and had four children. His younger brother, Geoffrey, was the 8th bishop of Tasmania.

He died on 25 October 1954 at Stratford near Sale in Victoria.

== Notes ==
Church of England titles
Preceded by Arthur Wellesley Pain	Bishop of Gippsland; 1917 –1942	Succeeded by Donald Burns Blackwood
