= David Garnsey =

Australian bishop

David Arthur Garnsey (31 July 1909 – 14 July 1996) was the 5th Bishop of Gippsland from 1959 until 1974.

Garnsey was educated at the University of Sydney, winning a Rhodes Scholarship in 1931, and at New College, Oxford. He was ordained in 1935. His first post was as a curate at the University Church of St Mary the Virgin, Oxford. From 1941 he was rector of Young, New South Wales, in the Diocese of Canberra and Goulburn and was elected a canon of St Saviour's Cathedral, Goulburn. From 1948 until his consecration to the episcopate in 1959, he was headmaster of Canberra Grammar School for ten years (1948-1958) after being invited to the job by Ernest Burgmann (Bishop Of Canberra and Goulburn)

In Gippsland, Garnsey took a leading role in promoting women for church leadership and was "in the forefront of radical thinking in the areas of women's ministry and ecumenical partnerships". In 1966 the synod of Victoria appointed him to chair a commission on the ministry of deaconesses. His own diocese had already accorded clerical status (ordained by the laying on of hands) to its deaconesses but this practice (and recognition) was not universal among the Australian dioceses.

Garnsey married Evangeline (Evanne) Eleanor Wood (1909-1987), the daughter of Professor George Arnold Wood. After the death of her brother Alan Wood in 1957 and his widow in 1958, the Garnseys adopted their two young sons.

== Notes ==
Church of England titles
Preceded by Edwin John Davidson	Bishop of Gippsland; 1959–1974	Succeeded by Graham Richard Delbridge
