= Richard Treloar =

Australian Anglican bishop (born 1965)

The Right Reverend Richard Treloar
- Bishop of Gippsland
- Church: Anglican Church of Australia
- Diocese: Anglican Diocese of Gippsland
- In office: 18 August 2018 to present
- Predecessor: Kay Goldsworthy
- Other post: Vicar of Christ Church South Yarra in the Anglican Diocese of Melbourne (2007–2018)

Orders
- Ordination: 1990 (deacon); 1992 (priest) by John Hazlewood
- Consecration: 21 July 2018 by Philip Freier

Personal details
- Born: Richard Stanley Treloar; 1965 (age 60–61)
- Denomination: Anglican
- Education: Trinity College, University of Melbourne and Monash University

Richard Stanley Treloar (born 1965) is an Australian Anglican bishop. He is the current Bishop of Gippsland in the Province of Victoria.

Treloar was born and raised in Sydney. He studied theology at Trinity College Theological School, graduating Bachelor of Theology and Master of Theology, and at Monash University where he obtained his PhD. Treloar was ordained deacon and priest in the Anglican Diocese of Ballarat and served as curate at St Peter's Ballarat and Christchurch Warrnambool before becoming rector of the Parish of Skipton (1993-1997). In 1998, he was appointed the associate chaplain and Stewart Lecturer in Theology at Trinity College. He went on to become chaplain of the college from 2003 to 2007. In 2007 he was appointed vicar of Christ Church, South Yarra. During this time, he also served as the president of Christ Church Grammar School. He served in these positions until his election as the thirteenth Bishop of Gippsland and his subsequent consecration as a bishop in July 2018. He is a member of the Liturgy Commission of General Synod and has served on the boards of the Brotherhood of St Laurence and Melbourne Grammar School. He is an honorary research associate of the University of Divinity and has published widely in the field of biblical interpretation.

Anglican Communion titles
Preceded by Kay Goldsworthy	Bishop of Gippsland; 2018	Incumbent
