= Colin Sheumack =

Colin Davies Sheumack (9 February 1929 – 5 January 2006) was the 8th Bishop of Gippsland from 1987 to 1994.

Sheumack was educated at Inverell High School and Moore College. He was Rector of Kemeruka and then Kyabram, Archdeacon of Bendigo and Dean of Bathurst before his ordination to the episcopate. He was consecrated a bishop on 20 December 1987 at St Paul's Cathedral, Melbourne.
