= Anglican Church of Australia =

Church of the Anglican Communion

- Arms Flag
- Classification: Protestant
- Orientation: Anglican
- Scripture: Holy Bible
- Theology: Anglican doctrine
- Polity: Episcopal
- Primate: Mark Short
- Territory: Australia
- Independence: 1962
- Members: 3,881,000 (2017)
- Official website: anglican.org.au

The Anglican Church of Australia, previously known as the Church of England in Australia and Tasmania, is a Christian church in Australia and an autonomous church of the worldwide Anglican Communion. It is the second largest Christian church in Australia, after the Catholic Church. In 2016, responding to a peer-reviewed study published in the Journal of Anglican Studies by Cambridge University Press, the Anglican Church of Australia reported that it had 4,865,328 total baptised members. In 2017, Growth and Decline in the Anglican Communion: 1980 to the Present, published by Routledge, collected research reporting there were 3.8 million members of the church. In reporting to the World Council of Churches, the church claimed 3,881,000 total members. The Church of England Yearbook 2024 reported 3,679,688 members. According to the 2021 census, 2.5 million Australians (9.8% of the population) self-identified as Anglicans.

For much of Australian history since the arrival of the First Fleet in January 1788, the church was the largest religious denomination. In recent times, however, Anglicanism in Australia has mirrored the steep decline in church membership and attendance experienced in many first-world nations.

The church is one of the largest providers of social welfare services in Australia.

== History ==
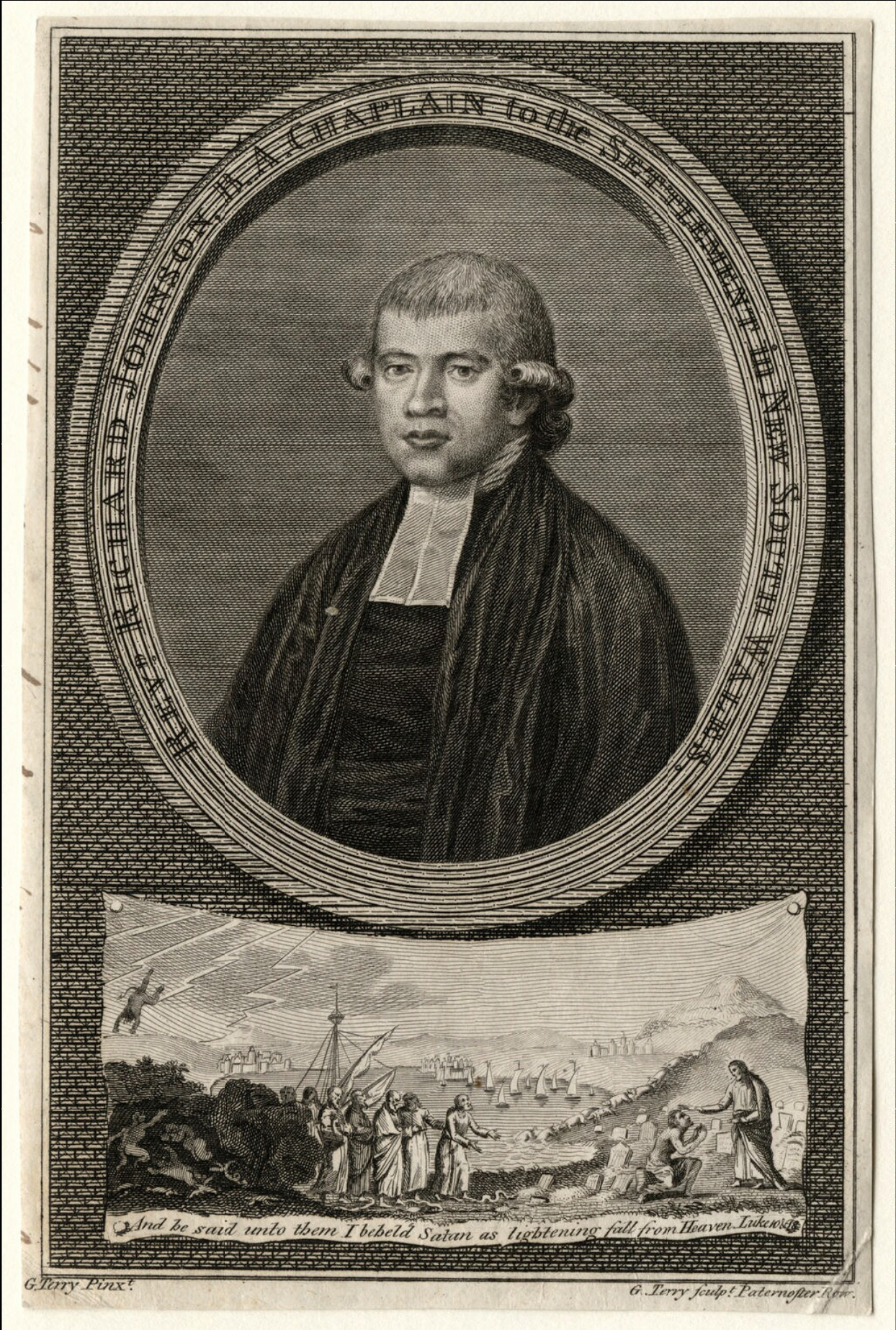
Richard Johnson, the chaplain of the First Fleet

When the First Fleet was sent to New South Wales in 1787, Richard Johnson of the Church of England was licensed as chaplain to the fleet and the settlement. In 1825 Thomas Scott was appointed Archdeacon of Australia under the jurisdiction of the Bishop of Calcutta, Reginald Heber. William Grant Broughton, who succeeded Scott in 1829, was consecrated the first (and only) "Bishop of Australia" in 1836.

In early Colonial times, the Church of England clergy worked closely with the governors. Richard Johnson was charged by the governor, Arthur Phillip, with improving "public morality" in the colony, but he was also heavily involved in health and education. Samuel Marsden (1765–1838) had magisterial duties and so was equated with the authorities by the convicts. He became known as the "flogging parson" for the severity of his punishments. Some of the Irish convicts had been transported to Australia for political crimes or social rebellion in Ireland, so the authorities were suspicious of Roman Catholicism for the first three decades of settlement and Roman Catholic convicts were "compelled to attend the more or less perfunctory services of the Anglican Church". In New South Wales and Tasmania, the children of Catholic convicts and all orphans under the care of the colonial government were brought up as Anglicans.

The Church of England lost its legal privileges in the Colony of New South Wales by the Church Act of 1836. Drafted by the reformist attorney-general John Plunkett, the act established legal equality for Anglicans, Roman Catholics and Presbyterians and was later extended to Methodists.

The Church Missionary Society established a mission to Aboriginal people in 1832 in the Wellington Valley, New South Wales, but it ended in failure: indigenous people in the 19th century demonstrated a reluctance to convert to the religion of the colonists who were seizing their lands.

In 1842 the Diocese of Tasmania was created. In 1847 the rest of the Diocese of Australia was divided into the four separate dioceses of Sydney, Adelaide, Newcastle and Melbourne. Over the following 80 years the number of dioceses increased to 25.

The Australian Constitution of 1901 provided for freedom of religion. Australian society was predominantly Anglo-Celtic, with 40% of the population being Anglican.

In the early years of the 20th century the Church of England transformed itself in its patterns of worship, in the internal appearances of its churches, and in the forms of piety recommended by its clergy. The changes represented a heightened emphasis on the sacraments and were introduced by younger clergy trained in England and inspired by the Oxford and Anglo-Catholic movements. The church's women and its upper and middle class parishes were most supportive, overcoming the reluctance of some of the men. The changes were widely adopted by the 1920s, making the Church of England more self-consciously "Anglican" and distinct from other churches. Controversy erupted, especially in New South Wales, between the politically liberal proponents of the Social Gospel, who wanted more church attention to the social ills of society, and conservative elements. The opposition of the strong conservative evangelical forces within the Sydney diocese limited the liberals during the 1930s, but their ideas contributed to the formation of the influential post-World War II Christian Social Order Movement.

The church remained the largest Christian denomination until the 1986 census. After World War II, the ethnic and cultural mix of Australia diversified and Anglicanism gave way to Roman Catholicism as the largest denomination. The number of Anglicans attending regular worship began to decline in 1959 and figures for occasional services (baptisms, confirmations, weddings and funerals) started to decline after 1966. In recent times, the Anglican and other Christian churches in Australia have been active in ecumenical activity. The Australian committee for the World Council of Churches was established in 1946 by the Anglican and mainline Protestant churches. The movement evolved and expanded with Eastern and Oriental Orthodox churches later joining and by 1994 the Roman Catholic Church was also a member of the national ecumenical body, the National Council of Churches in Australia.

Since 1 January 1962 the Australian church has been autocephalous and headed by its own primate. On 24 August 1981 the church officially changed its name from the Church of England in Australia and Tasmania to the Anglican Church of Australia.

Although the Book of Common Prayer remains the official standard for Anglican belief and worship in Australia, An Australian Prayer Book (AAPB) was published in 1978 after a prolonged revision of liturgy. Another alternative service book, A Prayer Book for Australia (APBA), was published in 1995.

In 1985 the general synod of the Australian church passed a canon to allow the ordination of women as deacons. In 1992 the general synod approved legislation allowing dioceses to ordain women to the priesthood. Dioceses could choose to adopt the legislation. In 1992, 90 women were ordained in the Anglican Church of Australia and three others who had been ordained overseas were recognised. After decades of debate, women's ordination is rejected in a minority of dioceses. As of November 2024, only two (Sydney and North-West Australia) of the 23 dioceses have never ordained women as priests. A third diocese (Armidale) has ordained two women as priests but limited their service to the Anglican girls school and does not ordain women as priests for its churches. In 2008, Kay Goldsworthy was ordained as an assistant bishop for the Diocese of Perth, thus becoming the first woman consecrated as a bishop of the Anglican Church of Australia. Sarah Macneil was elected in 2013 to be the first female diocesan bishop in Australia. In 2014 she was consecrated and installed as the first female diocesan bishop in Australia (for the Diocese of Grafton in New South Wales).

The church remains a major provider of education and welfare services in Australia. It provides chaplains to the Australian Defence Force, hospitals, schools, industry and prisons. Senior clergy such as Peter Jensen, former Archbishop of Sydney, have a high profile in discussions on a diverse range of social issues in contemporary national debates. In recent times the church has encouraged its leaders to talk on such issues as indigenous rights; international security; peace and justice; and poverty and equity. The current primate is Mark Short, bishop of Canberra and Goulburn, who commenced in the role on 1 November 2025. Short is the first-ever non-metropolitan bishop to serve as primate and the first evangelical to hold the post since Marcus Loane of Sydney retired in 1982.

Like other religious groups, the church has come under criticism in light of cases of sexual abuse by clergy and others. For example, in 2003, one of the former leading clergy was defrocked for sexual misconduct involving a 14-year-old girl. Victor Roland Cole relinquished his holy orders at the request of then Archbishop of Sydney, Peter Jensen.

=== 2022 split ===
On 16 August 2022, the church experienced a split when some conservatives formed the breakaway Diocese of the Southern Cross. It is led by a former Archbishop of Sydney, Glenn Davies. The split was principally caused over same sex marriage among other issues. The diocese is backed by the current Archbishop of Sydney, Kanishka Raffel, and the Bishop of Tasmania, Richard Condie. In September 2022, the Diocese of Sydney voted to declare the church to be in a state of "deep breach of fellowship" as a result of the division. The diocese vowed to provide support for conservative Anglicans both within the Anglican Church of Australia and the breakaway Diocese of the Southern Cross.

== Demographics ==
Major religious affiliations in Australia by census year

People who identified as Anglican as a percentage of the total Australian population at the 2011 census, divided geographically by statistical local area

Since the arrival of the First Fleet in 1788, the Anglican Church of Australia had been the largest religious denomination until the 1986 census, after which Roman Catholics outnumbered Anglicans by an increasing margin. The percentage of Anglican affiliation peaked in 1921 at 43.7%, and the number of persons indicating Anglican affiliation in an Australian census peaked in 1991 at 4,018,779.

In the 2011 Census, 3,679,907 people named their religious affiliation as Anglican. In the 2016 Census, 3.1 million Australians self-identified as Anglicans. Five years later, in the 2021 Census, the total was 2,496,273 – a decline of almost one-third, 32 per cent. Those figures represented 17.1% and 9.8% respectively of the census populations, a decline of 42%. In 2016, the Journal of Anglican Studies stated that of approximately 4,865,328 total members claimed by the church, the number of active members was 437,880. In 2017, another peer-reviewed study, published by Routledge Press, reported that the average weekly Anglican attendance had fallen to 155,000 in 2011 from 191,600 in 1991. The steep decline in church membership and attendance has mirrored the experience in many first-world, mostly post-modern nations.

Percentage of respondents stating religious affiliation as Anglican in Australian censuses
State / territory	% 2021	% 2016	% 2011	% 2006	% 2001
Australian Capital Territory	8.2	10.8	14.7	16.7	18.5
New South Wales	11.9	15.5	20.0	21.8	23.8
Northern Territory	6.0	8.4	11.4	12.3	14.7
Queensland	11.3	15.3	18.9	20.4	22.5
South Australia	7.2	10.0	12.6	13.7	15.2
Tasmania	14.4	20.4	26.0	29.3	32.4
Victoria	6.5	9.0	12.3	13.6	15.3
Western Australia	10.1	14.3	18.8	20.4	22.6
Total Australia	9.8	13.3	17.1	18.7	20.7

One explanation for the reduced prevalence of Anglicanism relates to changes in Australia's immigration patterns. Before the Second World War, the majority of immigrants to Australia had come from the United Kingdom – though most of Australia's Roman Catholic immigrants had come from Ireland. After World War II, Australia's immigration program diversified and more than 6.5 million migrants arrived in Australia in the 60 years after the war, including more than a million Roman Catholics.

Unlike other churches, the Anglican Church of Australia does not publish churchwide attendance statistics. In 2011, the National Church Life Survey estimated that 155,000 Australians attended an Anglican church weekly, down from 191,600 in 1991. However, the church does tabulate figures on clergy, which are used to allocate diocesan representation at General Synod. In 2015, there were 2,441 active bishops, priests and deacons in the church, up from 2,340 in 1991.

== Structure ==
The Australian church consists of twenty-three dioceses arranged into five provinces (except for Tasmania) with the metropolitical sees in the states' capital cities. Anglican clergy are concentrated in Australia's major cities, with the five metropolitical dioceses accounting for 64 per cent of active clergy. When adding the mixed urban and rural dioceses of Canberra and Goulburn, Newcastle, Northern Territory and Tasmania, urban areas account for 79 per cent of active clergy. The evangelical Diocese of Sydney is by far the largest diocese: in 2011, its 58,300 weekly attenders accounted for 37.6 per cent of the Anglican Church's weekly attendance, and in 2015, the diocese's 688 active clergy accounted for 28.1 per cent of the active clergy across the church.

Broughton Publishing is the church's national publishing arm.

== Indigenous ministry ==
The National Aboriginal and Torres Strait Islander Anglican Council (NATSIAC) appoints two Indigenous bishops for national work with Indigenous Australians: the National Aboriginal Bishop (currently Chris McLeod) is based in South Australia (as an assistant bishop of the Anglican Diocese of Adelaide); while the National Torres Strait Islander Bishop (currently vacant) is based at Thursday Island, Queensland (as an assistant bishop of the Anglican Diocese of North Queensland). Gloria Shipp was the first woman elected Chair of NATSIAC.

== Society, arts and culture ==
=== Welfare and education ===
Anglicans have played a prominent role in welfare and education since Colonial times, when First Fleet chaplain Richard Johnson was credited by one convict as "the physician both of soul and body" during the famine of 1790 and was charged with general supervision of schools. Today the church remains a significant provider of social welfare with organisations working in education, health, missionary work, social welfare and communications. Welfare organisations include Anglicare and Samaritans. The Anglicare network comprises 9000 volunteers beyond paid staff, who assisted some 940,000 Australians in 2016 in areas such as emergency relief, aged care, family support and assistance for the homeless.

There are around 145 Anglican schools in Australia, providing for more than 105,000 children. Church schools range from low-fee, regional and special needs schools to high-fee leading independent schools such as Geelong Grammar (whose alumni include Charles III and Rupert Murdoch) and The Kings School in Sydney. Anglican Schools Australia is the national schools network of the general synod.

=== Architecture ===
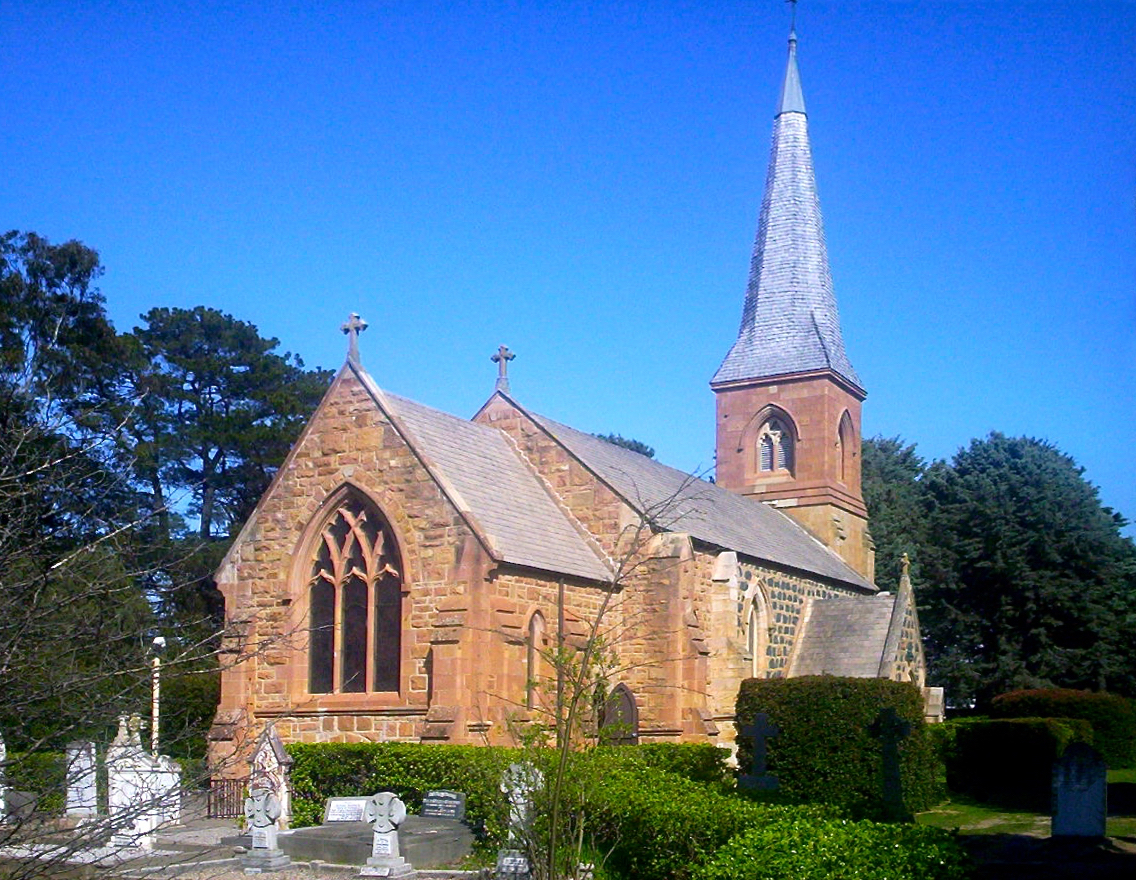
St John the Baptist Church, Reid, built in the 1840s, is the oldest building within Canberra's city precinct

The first Church of England edifice was built in the colony of New South Wales in 1793. Today, most towns in Australia have at least one Christian church. One of Australia's oldest Anglican churches is St James' Church in Sydney, built between 1819 and 1824. The historic church was designed by Governor Macquarie's architect, Francis Greenway – a former convict – and built with convict labour. The church is set on a sandstone base and built of face brick with the walls articulated by brick piers. Sydney's Anglican cathedral, St Andrew's, was consecrated in 1868 from foundations laid in the 1830s. Largely designed by Edmund Thomas Blacket in the Perpendicular Gothic style reminiscent of English cathedrals. Blacket also designed St Saviour's Cathedral in Goulburn, based on the Decorated Gothic style of a large English parish church and built between 1874 and 1884.

St Paul's Cathedral, Melbourne, from a foundation stone laid in 1880, is a Melbourne landmark. It was designed by the distinguished English architect William Butterfield in Gothic Transitional.

Tasmania is home to a number of significant colonial Anglican buildings including those located at Australia's best preserved convict era settlement, Port Arthur. According to 19th century notions of prisoner reform, the Model Prison incorporates a grim chapel, into which prisoners in solitary confinement were shepherded to listen (in individual enclosures) to the preacher's Sunday sermon – their only permitted interaction with another human being. Adelaide, the capital of South Australia has long been known as the City of Churches and its St Peter's Anglican Cathedral is a noted city landmark.

The oldest building in the city of Canberra is the picturesque St John the Baptist Church in Reid, consecrated in 1845. This church long predates the city of Canberra and is not so much representative of urban design as it is of the Bush chapels which dot the Australian landscape and stretch even into the far Outback.

A number of notable Victorian era chapels and edifices were also constructed at church schools across Australia. Along with community attitudes to religion, church architecture changed significantly during the 20th century.

== Ordination of women ==
Since 1985 the church has permitted the ordination of women on a diocesan basis. The first woman to be ordained was Marion Macfarlane, ordained to the Female Diaconate in 1884 in the Diocese of Melbourne. In 1992, the first women were ordained as priests, initially in the Diocese of Perth and then around the country. In 2008, the Diocese of Perth consecrated the first female bishop, the Rt Revd Kay Goldsworthy. In 2014, the Diocese of Grafton consecrated and installed the first female diocesan bishop, the Rt Revd Sarah Macneil. Bishop Kay Goldsworthy became the second female diocesan bishop when she was enthroned as bishop of Gippsland then in 2018 she was installed as Archbishop of Perth. The dioceses of Sydney, North West Australia and formerly The Murray did not ordain women as priests. In 2017, the Diocese of The Murray ordained its first female deacon, becoming the last diocese to ordain women to the diaconate. In August 2017, the Anglicans of Western Australia elected the Anglican Church of Australia's first female archbishop, Kay Goldsworthy. In a statement representing a conservative and complementarian view, Bishop Gary Nelson said that Archbishop Goldsworthy "would not be recognised in her new role" as the metropolitan for the province.

In June 2023 the Synod of The Murray voted to allow the ordination of women as priests and on 12 August 2023, Bishop Keith Dalby ordained three women and one man to the priesthood.

Of the 23 Anglican dioceses in Australia, only two have never ordained women to the priesthood: the Diocese of Sydney and the Diocese of North West Australia. The Diocese of Armidale does not generally ordain women to the priesthood but two women were ordained priest for the Anglican girls school.

== Same-sex unions and LGBT clergy ==
In the Seventeenth Session of the General Synod of the Anglican Church of Australia in 2017, the Anglican Church passed a motion recognising "that the doctrine of our church, in line with traditional Christian teaching, is that marriage is an exclusive and lifelong union of a man and a woman, and further, recognises that this has been the subject of several General Synod resolutions over the past fifteen years". In 2018, the then-Primate of Australia and Archbishop of Melbourne, Philip Freier, released an ad clerum reiterating the current position that clergy cannot perform a same-sex marriage, though they could offer prayers and other forms of pastoral support for same-sex couples. In 2020, the church's highest court, the Appellate Tribunal, ruled that a diocese may authorise the blessing of persons in same-sex unions. At the same time, the church does not have an official stance on homosexuality itself.

During a meeting, the House of Bishops stated that they "accept the weight of 1998 Lambeth Resolution 1.10 and the 2004 General Synod resolutions 33, 59 and 61–64 as expressing the mind of this church on issues of human sexuality ... and understand that issues of sexuality are subject to ongoing conversation". A former primate, Peter Carnley, supported the blessing of same-sex relationships and supported "recognition of lifelong friendships between two homosexuals which would give them the same legal status as a heterosexual married couple". A spokesman for Phillip Aspinall, the Archbishop of Brisbane, stated that "In effect it is an undertaking not to ordain, license, authorise or appoint persons whom the bishop knows to be in a sexual relationship outside of marriage." At the same time, Archbishop Aspinall stated that he personally does not take an official position. Despite what the spokesman said, however, an Anglican priest came out as gay in 2005 in Melbourne. In the Diocese of Perth, "there are gay and lesbian clergy serving in the priesthood." Archbishop Roger Herft, as a diocesan bishop, "support[ed] blessing gay unions". In 2012, a bishop "appoint[ed] a gay priest in a same-sex partnership to a Gippsland parish." The Anglican Diocese of Sydney, the largest of the country, has expressed its opposition to same-sex unions and has been involved in the Anglican realignment as a member of the Fellowship of Confessing Anglicans. However, many clergy and bishops support same-sex unions. The Wangaratta and Ballarat dioceses have voted to support the blessing of same-sex civil unions. The dioceses of Wangaratta and Newcastle have approved of blessing rites for same-sex marriages. Blessings for same-sex unions are also permitted in the Diocese of Brisbane. In 2012, the Diocese of Gippsland appointed an openly partnered gay priest. In 2013, the Diocese of Perth voted in favour of recognising same-sex unions. Archbishop Roger Herft vetoed the Perth motion. In 2015, the Bishop of Wangaratta endorsed same-sex marriage legislation and some diocesan clergy offered to perform gay marriages when allowed to do so. In the Diocese of Grafton, former bishop Sarah Macneil took an affirming stance. Bishop Greg Thompson of the Diocese of Newcastle had taken a stance in favour of gay rights.

In 2015, an arm of the Anglican Church in Southern Queensland voted in favour of same-sex civil unions. Also, Bishop Kay Goldsworthy appointed an openly gay and partnered priest to another post. In response, the Sydney synod passed a resolution criticising the actions of the Dioceses of Gippsland and Wangaratta, and declaring a break "of collegiality and fellowship" with the dioceses. In 2016, the Bishop of Ballarat declared his support for same-sex marriage. In April 2016, a parish in the Diocese of Perth blessed the union of a same-sex couple. At its general synod in 2017, a resolution was passed criticising the Scottish Episcopal Church for its acceptance of same-sex marriage as well as an additional resolution calling for the church in Australia "to have a series of conversations on its understanding of sexuality". Also in 2017, the Diocese of Perth in Western Australia elected Bishop Kay Goldsworthy as its archbishop. Goldsworthy said that she supports an "inclusive" approach to same-sex marriage. "Archbishop Goldsworthy revealed that she had voted Yes in the same-sex marriage survey." In 2022, Goldsworthy ordained an openly gay man in a civil partnership in Perth.

Regarding transgender issues, there are dioceses and congregations with serving transgender clergy. In 2017, Archbishop Phillip Aspinall asked for "prayerful support" for the Revd Josephine Inkpin who had transitioned and come out as a transgender woman. "The Archbishop of Brisbane Dr Phillip Aspinall supported Dr Inkpin and passed on her statement to clergy in July 2017, along with his wish that 'unhelpful speculation' might be avoided." Inkpin continues to serve in the Brisbane diocese. She shared that the bishops and leaders of the Diocese of Brisbane "have assisted in arrangements for enabling [her] public recognition of gender." Inkpin, who is married to the Revd Penny Jones, one of the first female priests ordained in Australia, is the first openly transgender priest in Australia. The State Library of Queensland interviewed Inkpin and her wife about the intersection of gender, faith, religion and identity for their "Dangerous Women" podcast.

Controversy over LGBT issues caused a split from the church in 2022: a former Archbishop of Sydney, Glenn Davies, alongside two congregations, left the Anglican Church of Australia to form the newly-formed Diocese of the Southern Cross which is affiliated to the conservative Global Fellowship of Confessing Anglicans (GAFCON). The split was endorsed by the Bishop of Tasmania, Richard Condie and the Archbishop of Sydney Kanishka Raffel, but was described as "dangerous for the Church" by the Archbishop of Canterbury at the time, Justin Welby.

== Provinces and dioceses ==
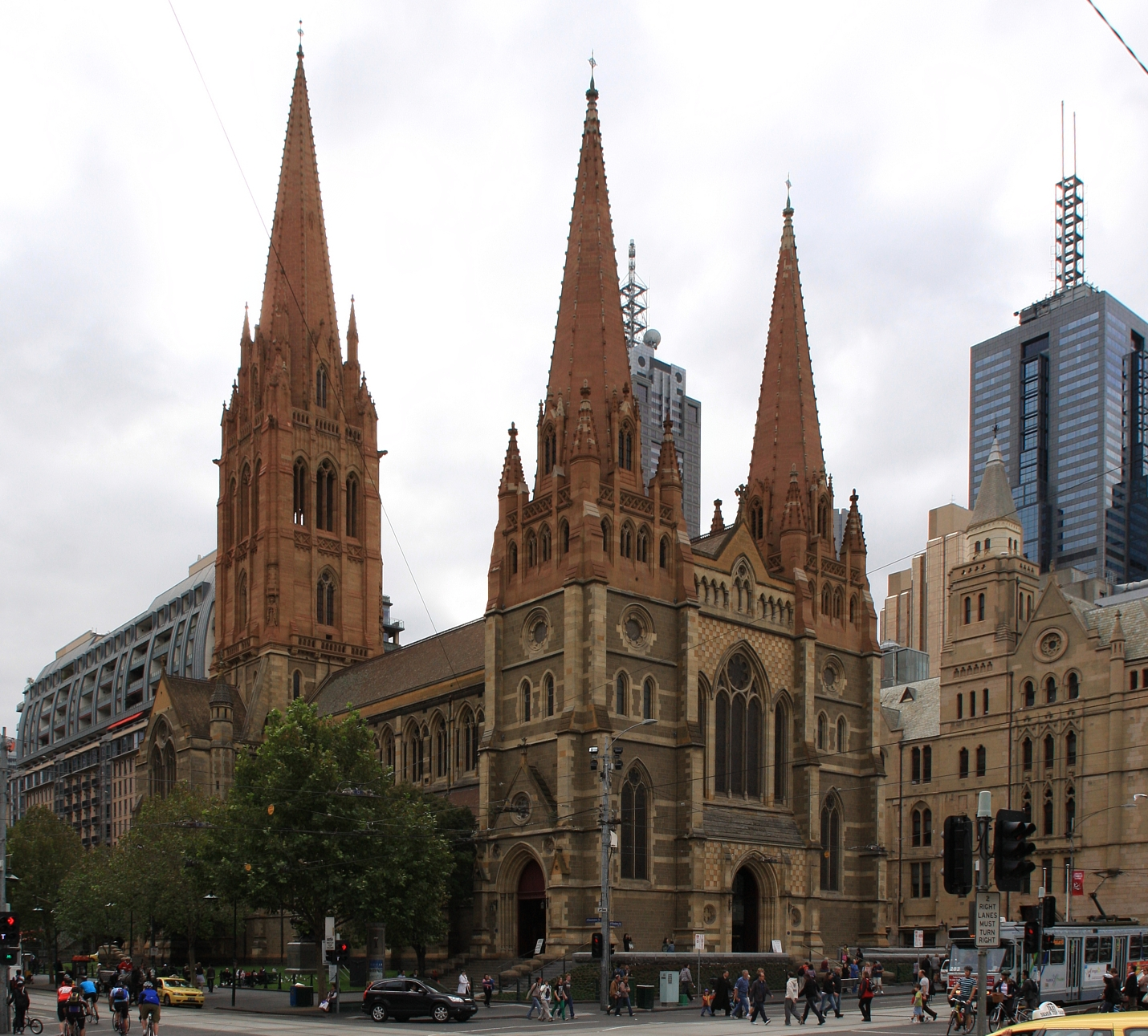
St Paul's Cathedral, Melbourne seen from Flinders Street station

The whole church is led by the primate, Mark Short, bishop of Canberra and Goulburn. The provinces and dioceses are listed with each diocese's bishop or archbishop:

- Province of South Australia (Metropolitan: Brad Billings, Archbishop of Adelaide)
  - Diocese of Adelaide (Archbishop: Brad Billings)
  - Diocese of The Murray (Vacant)
  - Diocese of Willochra (Jeremy James)
- Province of New South Wales (Metropolitan: Kanishka Raffel, Archbishop of Sydney)
  - Diocese of Armidale (Rod Chiswell)
  - Diocese of Bathurst (Mark Calder)
  - Diocese of Canberra and Goulburn (Mark Short)
  - Diocese of Grafton (Murray Harvey)
  - Diocese of Newcastle (Peter Stuart)
  - Diocese of Riverina (Donald Kirk)
  - Diocese of Sydney (Archbishop: Kanishka Raffel)
- Province of Victoria (Metropolitan: Archbishop of Melbourne, Ric Thorpe)
  - Diocese of Ballarat (Garry Weatherill)
  - Diocese of Bendigo (Matthew Brain)
  - Diocese of Gippsland (Richard Treloar)
  - Diocese of Melbourne (Archbishop: Ric Thorpe)
  - Diocese of Wangaratta (Clarence Bester)
- Province of Queensland (Metropolitan: Jeremy Greaves, Archbishop of Brisbane)
  - Diocese of Brisbane (Archbishop: Jeremy Greaves)
  - Diocese of North Queensland (Keith Joseph)
  - Diocese of the Northern Territory (Greg Anderson)
  - Diocese of Rockhampton (Peter Grice)
- Province of Western Australia (Metropolitan: Kay Goldsworthy, Archbishop of Perth)
  - Diocese of Bunbury (Ian Coutts)
  - Diocese of North West Australia (Darrell Parker)
  - Diocese of Perth (Archbishop: Kay Goldsworthy)
- Extraprovincial diocese
  - Diocese of Tasmania (Richard Condie)

=== Map of dioceses ===
KEY to province colours	New South Wales	Victoria	Queensland	Western Australia	South Australia	Extraprovincial

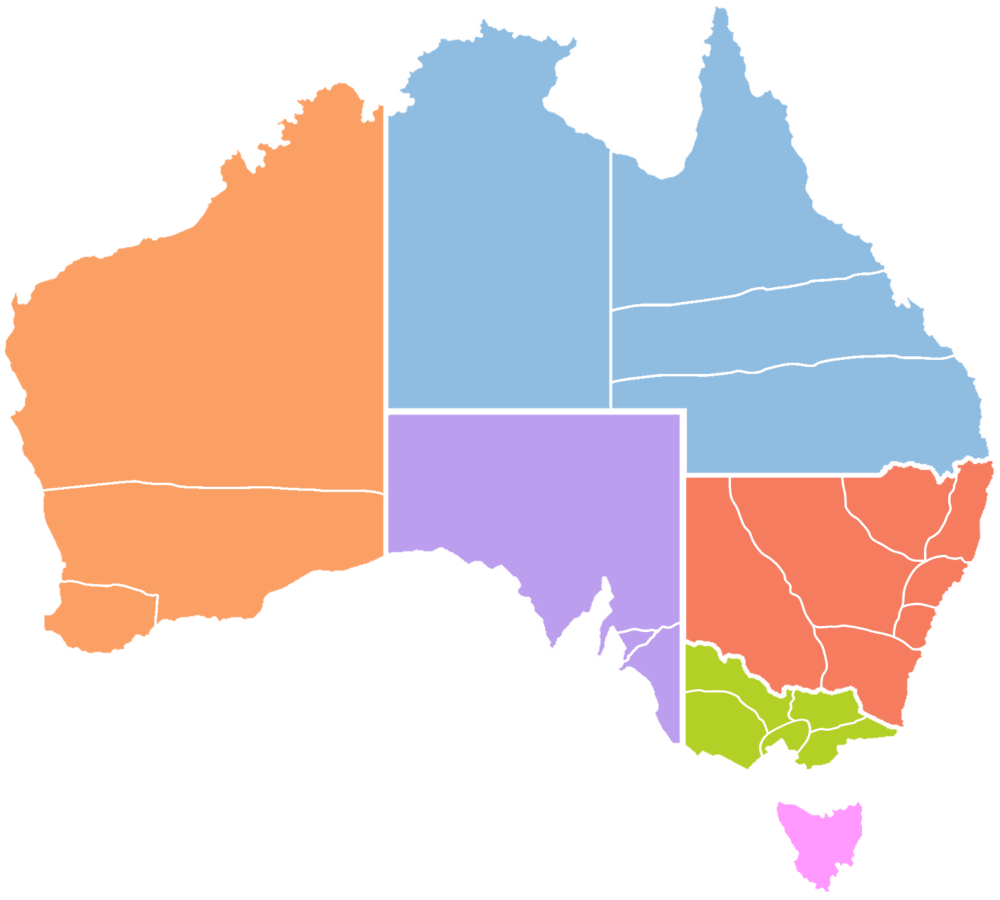

A number of former dioceses have been merged into the current diocese or have formed other Anglican churches:

- Carpentaria (formerly part of the province of Queensland, 1900–1996, and now part of the Diocese of North Queensland)
- Kalgoorlie (formerly part of the province of Western Australia, 1914–1973, and now part of the Diocese of Perth)
- New Guinea (formerly part of the province of Queensland, 1898–1976, and now the Anglican Church of Papua New Guinea)
- St Arnaud (formerly part of the province of Victoria, 1926–1976, and now part of the Diocese of Bendigo)

== Ecumenical relations ==
The church is a member of the Christian Conference of Asia.

== Relation with the Anglican realignment ==
The Anglican Diocese of Sydney has been a leading name in the Anglican realignment, since they first opposed the sexuality policies of the Episcopal Church of the United States and the Anglican Church of Canada. Archbishop Peter Jensen attended the first Global Anglican Future Conference, in June 2008, in Jerusalem, and was the chairman of GAFCON. The Anglican Diocese of Sydney and the Anglican Diocese of North West Australia have declared themselves in full communion with the Anglican Church in North America, started in June 2009, which represents Anglican realignment in United States and Canada.

The Fellowship of Confessing Anglicans was launched in Australia on 26 March 2015, in a conference held in Melbourne that reunited 460 members, including 40 from New Zealand, and was attended by Archbishop Eliud Wabukala, from the Anglican Church of Kenya, their international chairman, Archbishop Stanley Ntagali, from the Anglican Church of Uganda, and Archbishop Glenn Davies, from the Anglican Diocese of Sydney. The then archdeacon of the Anglican Diocese of Melbourne, now bishop Richard Condie, of the Anglican Diocese of Tasmania, became chairman of FCA Australia.

The Anglican Church of Australia passed a motion at their General Synod on 7 September 2017, condemning the Scottish Episcopal Church decision to approve same-sex marriage as "contrary to the doctrine of our church and the teaching of Christ", and declaring itself in "impaired communion" with the province. It also expressed "support for those Anglicans who have left or will need to leave (...) because of its redefinition of marriage and those who struggle and remain", and presented their prayers for the return of SEC "to the doctrine of Christ in this matter" and the restoration of the impaired communion.

The Anglican Church of Australia was represented at GAFCON III, held in Jerusalem on 17–22 June 2018, by a 218 members delegation, which included Archbishop Glenn Davies of Sydney and bishops Richard Condie of Tasmania, Gary Nelson of North West Australia and Ian Palmer of Bathurst.

In 2022 the Diocese of the Southern Cross, established as a company, became the first Anglican diocese in Australia to form outside the Anglican Church of Australia.

== See also ==
- Christianity in Australia
- Anglican Communion sexual abuse cases
- List of the first women ordained as priests in the Anglican Church of Australia in 1992
