= Bernard Montgomery =

British Army officer (1887–1976)

Field Marshal The Right Honourable The Viscount Montgomery of Alamein KG GCB DSO PC DL
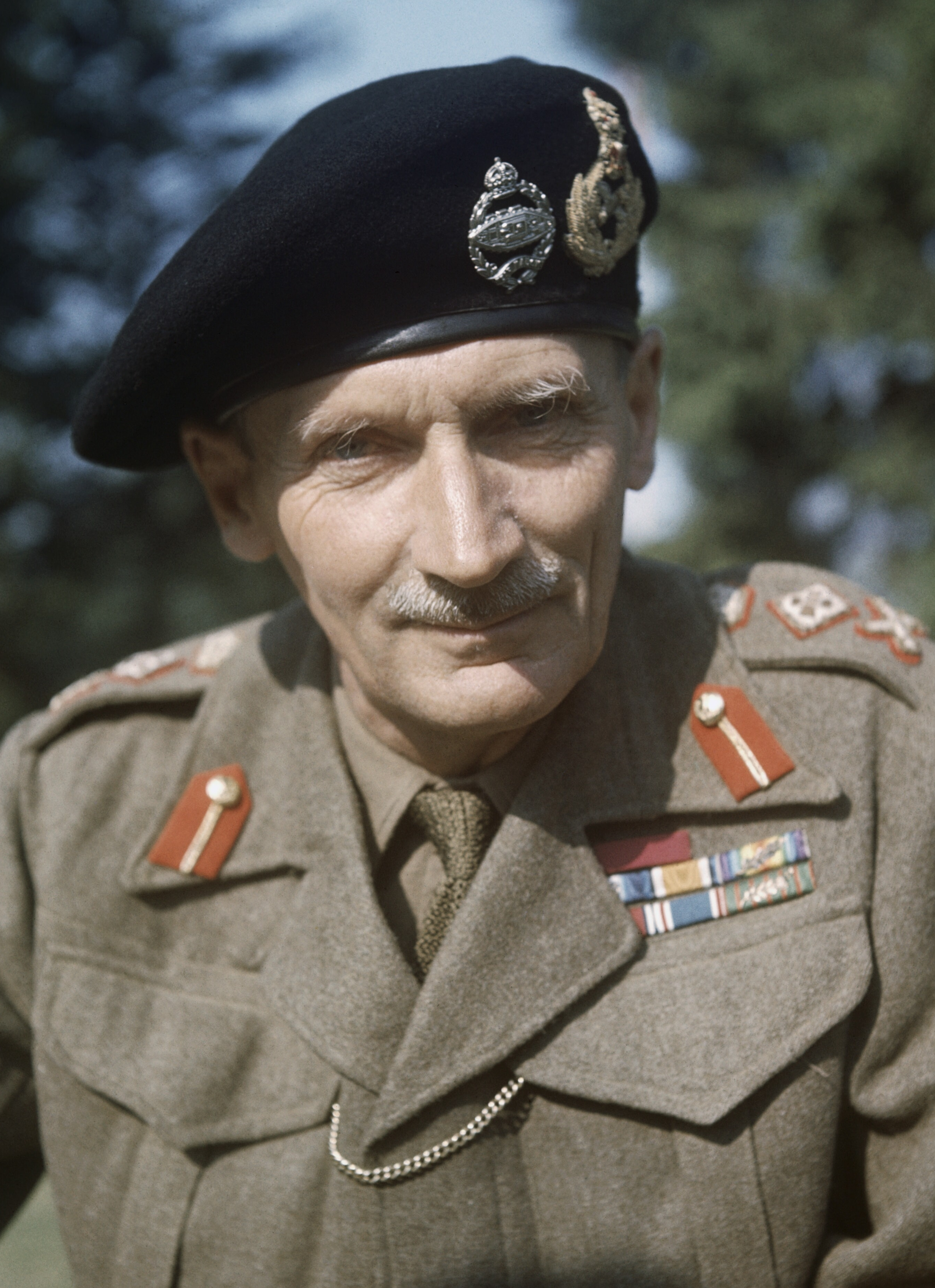
- Montgomery in 1943
- Born: 17 November 1887; Kennington, Surrey, England, UK
- Died: 24 March 1976 (aged 88); Alton, Hampshire, England, UK
- Burial place: Holy Cross Churchyard, Binsted, Hampshire
- Education: Royal Military College, Sandhurst
- Spouse: Betty Carver (m. 1927; died 1937)
- Relatives: Henry Montgomery (father); David Montgomery (son)
- Military career
- Allegiance: United Kingdom
- Branch: British Army
- Service years: 1908–1958
- Rank: Field Marshal
- Nickname: "Monty"
- Service number: 8742
- Unit: Royal Warwickshire Regiment
- Commands: Deputy Supreme Allied Commander Europe (1951–1958); Chairman of the Western Union Commanders-in-Chief Committee (1948–1951); Chief of the Imperial General Staff (1946–1948); British Army of the Rhine (1945–1946); 21st Army Group (1944–1945); Allied Ground Forces (Normandy) (1944); Eighth Army (1942–1943); South-Eastern Command (1941–1942); XII Corps (1941); V Corps (1940–1941); II Corps (1940); 3rd Infantry Division (1939–1940); 8th Infantry Division (1938–1939); 9th Infantry Brigade (1937–1938); 1st Battalion, Royal Warwickshire Regiment (1931–1934); 17th (Service) Battalion, Royal Fusiliers (1919)
- Conflicts: See battles: First World War; Western Front; First Battle of Ypres; Battle of Arras; Battle of Passchendaele; Anglo-Irish War; Arab revolt in Palestine; Second World War; Battle of France; Battle of Dunkirk; Dunkirk evacuation; North African Campaign; Battle of Alam el Halfa; Second Battle of El Alamein; Battle of El Agheila; Tunisian Campaign; Battle of Medenine; Battle of the Mareth Line; Italian campaign; Sicilian Campaign; Allied invasion of Italy; Operation Overlord; Battle for Caen; Operation Goodwood; Operation Cobra; Battle of the Falaise Pocket; Liberation of Paris; Siegfried Line Campaign; Operation Market Garden; Clearing the Channel Coast; Battle of the Bulge; Western Allied invasion of Germany; Operation Veritable; Operation Varsity; Operation Plunder; Battle of the Ruhr Pocket; Battle of Hamburg
- Awards: Knight Companion of the Order of the Garter; Knight Grand Cross of the Order of the Bath; Companion of the Distinguished Service Order; Mentioned in despatches (9)
- Other work: Colonel commandant, Royal Tank Regiment; Colonel commandant, Parachute Regiment (1944−1956); Representative colonel commandant, Royal Armoured Corps (1947–1957); Colonel commandant, Army Physical Training Corps (1946–1960); Colonel Royal Warwickshire Regiment (1947–1963); Deputy lieutenant of Southampton (1958–76)
- Montgomery's voice from the BBC programme Desert Island Discs, 20 December 1969

Field Marshal Bernard Law Montgomery, 1st Viscount Montgomery of Alamein (17 November 1887 – 24 March 1976), was a senior British Army officer who served in the First World War, the Irish War of Independence, and the Second World War.

Montgomery first saw action in the First World War as a junior officer of the Royal Warwickshire Regiment. At Méteren, near the Belgian border at Bailleul, he was shot through the right lung by a sniper during the First Battle of Ypres. On returning to the Western Front as a general staff officer, he took part in the Battle of Arras in April–May 1917. He also took part in the Battle of Passchendaele in late 1917 before finishing the war as chief of staff of the 47th (2nd London) Division. In the inter-war years he commanded the 17th (Service) Battalion, Royal Fusiliers and, later, the 1st Battalion, Royal Warwickshire Regiment before becoming commander of the 9th Infantry Brigade and then general officer commanding (GOC), 8th Infantry Division.

During the Western Desert campaign of the Second World War, Montgomery commanded the Eighth Army from August 1942. He subsequently commanded the Eighth Army during the Allied invasion of Sicily and the Allied invasion of Italy. During the Normandy campaign, he was in command of all Allied ground forces from 6 June 1944 until 1 September 1944. He then continued in command of the 21st Army Group for the rest of the North West Europe campaign, including the failed attempt to cross the Rhine during Operation Market Garden.

When German armoured forces broke through the U.S. lines in Belgium during the Battle of the Bulge, Montgomery received command of the northern shoulder of the Bulge. Montgomery's 21st Army Group, including the US Ninth Army and the First Allied Airborne Army, crossed the Rhine in Operation Plunder in March 1945. By the end of the war, troops under Montgomery's command had taken part in the encirclement of the Ruhr Pocket, liberated the Netherlands, and captured much of north-west Germany. On 4 May 1945, Montgomery accepted the surrender of the German forces in north-western Europe at Lüneburg Heath, south of Hamburg, after the surrender of Berlin to the USSR on 2 May.

After the war he became commander-in-chief of the British Army of the Rhine (BAOR) in Germany and then Chief of the Imperial General Staff (1946–1948). From 1948 to 1951, he served as chairman of the Commanders-in-Chief Committee of the Western Union. He then served as NATO's Deputy Supreme Allied Commander Europe until his retirement in 1958.

== Early life ==
Montgomery was born in Kennington, Surrey, in 1887, the fourth child of nine, to a Church of Ireland priest, Henry Montgomery, and his wife Maud (née Farrar). The Montgomerys, an Ulster Scots 'Ascendancy' gentry family, were the County Donegal branch of the Clan Montgomery. Henry Montgomery, at that time Vicar of St Mark's Church, Kennington, was the second son of Sir Robert Montgomery, a native of Inishowen in County Donegal in the north-west of Ulster, and a noted colonial administrator in British India. Sir Robert died a month after his grandson's birth. He was probably a descendant of Colonel Alexander Montgomery. Bernard's mother, Maud, was the daughter of Frederic William Farrar, the famous children's novelist and preacher, and was 18 years younger than her husband.

After the death of Sir Robert Montgomery, Henry inherited the Montgomery ancestral estate of New Park in Moville, a small town in Inishowen in the north of County Donegal in Ulster, the northern province in Ireland. There was still £13,000 to pay on a mortgage, a large debt in the 1880s (equivalent to £1,477,893 in 2025), and Henry was at the time still only an Anglican vicar. Despite selling off all the farms that were in the townland of Ballynally, on the north-western shores of Lough Foyle, "there was barely enough to keep up New Park and pay for the blasted summer holiday" (i.e., at New Park).

It was a financial relief of some magnitude when, in 1889, Henry was made Bishop of Tasmania, then still a British colony, and Bernard spent his formative years there. Bishop Montgomery considered it his duty to spend as much time as possible in the rural areas of Tasmania and was away for up to six months at a time. While he was away, his wife, still in her mid-20s, gave her children "constant" beatings, then ignored them most of the time. Of Bernard's siblings, Sibyl died prematurely in Tasmania, and Harold, Donald and Una all emigrated. Maud Montgomery took little active interest in the education of her young children other than to have them taught by tutors brought from Britain, although Bernard briefly attended the then coeducational St Michael's Collegiate School. The loveless environment made Bernard something of a bully, as he himself recalled: "I was a dreadful little boy. I don't suppose anybody would put up with my sort of behaviour these days." Later in life Montgomery refused to allow his son David to have anything to do with his grandmother, and refused to attend her funeral in 1949.

The family returned to England once for a Lambeth Conference in 1897, and Bernard and his brother Harold were educated at The King's School, Canterbury. In 1901, Bishop Montgomery became secretary of the Society for the Propagation of the Gospel, and the family returned to London. Montgomery attended St Paul's School and then the Royal Military College, Sandhurst, from which he was almost expelled for rowdiness and violence. On graduation in September 1908 he was commissioned into the 1st Battalion the Royal Warwickshire Regiment as a second lieutenant, and first saw overseas service later that year in India. He was promoted to lieutenant in 1910, and in 1912 became adjutant of the 1st Battalion of his regiment at Shorncliffe Army Camp.

== First World War ==
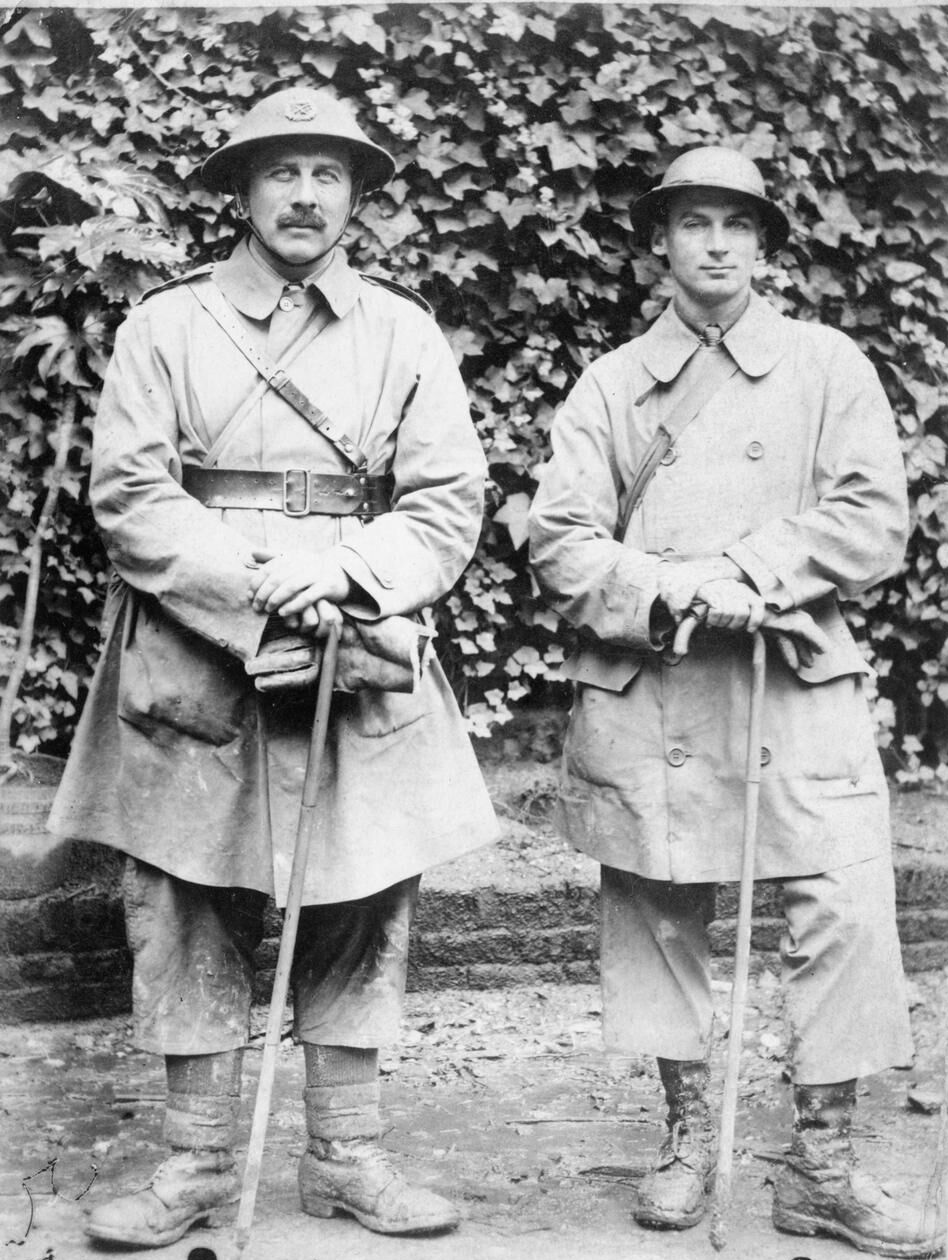
Captain Bernard Montgomery (right) with Brigadier-General J. W. Sandilands, commander of the 104th Brigade, 35th Division. Montgomery served as brigade major with the 104th Brigade from January 1915 until early 1917.

The Great War began in August 1914 and Montgomery moved to France with his battalion that month, which was at the time part of the 10th Infantry Brigade of the 4th Division of the British Expeditionary Force (BEF). He was promoted to temporary captain on 14 September. He saw action at the Battle of Le Cateau that month and during the retreat from Mons. At Méteren, near the Belgian border at Bailleul on 13 October 1914, during an Allied counter-offensive, he was shot through the right lung by a sniper. Lying in the open, he remained still and pretended to be dead, in the hope that he would not receive any more enemy attention. One of his men did attempt to rescue him but was shot dead by a hidden enemy sniper and collapsed over Montgomery. The sniper continued to fire and Montgomery was hit once more, in the knee, but the dead soldier, in Montgomery's words, "received many bullets meant for me." Assuming them to both be dead, the officers and men of Montgomery's battalion chose to leave them where they were until darkness arrived and stretcher bearers managed to recover the two bodies, with Montgomery by this time barely clinging on to life. The doctors at the advanced dressing station (ADS), too, had no hope for him and ordered a grave to be dug. Miraculously, however, Montgomery was still alive and, after being placed in an ambulance and then being sent to a hospital, was treated and eventually evacuated to England, where he would remain for well over a year. He was appointed a Companion of the Distinguished Service Order (DSO), for his gallant leadership during this period: the citation for this award, published in The London Gazette in December 1914 reads:

Conspicuous gallant leading on 13th October, when he turned the enemy out of their trenches with the bayonet. He was severely wounded.

After recovering in early 1915, he was seconded from his regiment and appointed as a brigade major, first of the 112th Infantry Brigade, and then with 104th Infantry Brigade, then training in Lancashire. He returned to the Western Front in early 1916 with his brigade, seeing service with it during the Battle of the Somme later in the year. In January 1917 he was assigned as a general staff officer, grade 2 (GSO2) with the 33rd Division and took part in the Battle of Arras in April–May. In July he transferred over as a GSO2 to IX Corps, part of General Sir Herbert Plumer's Second Army.

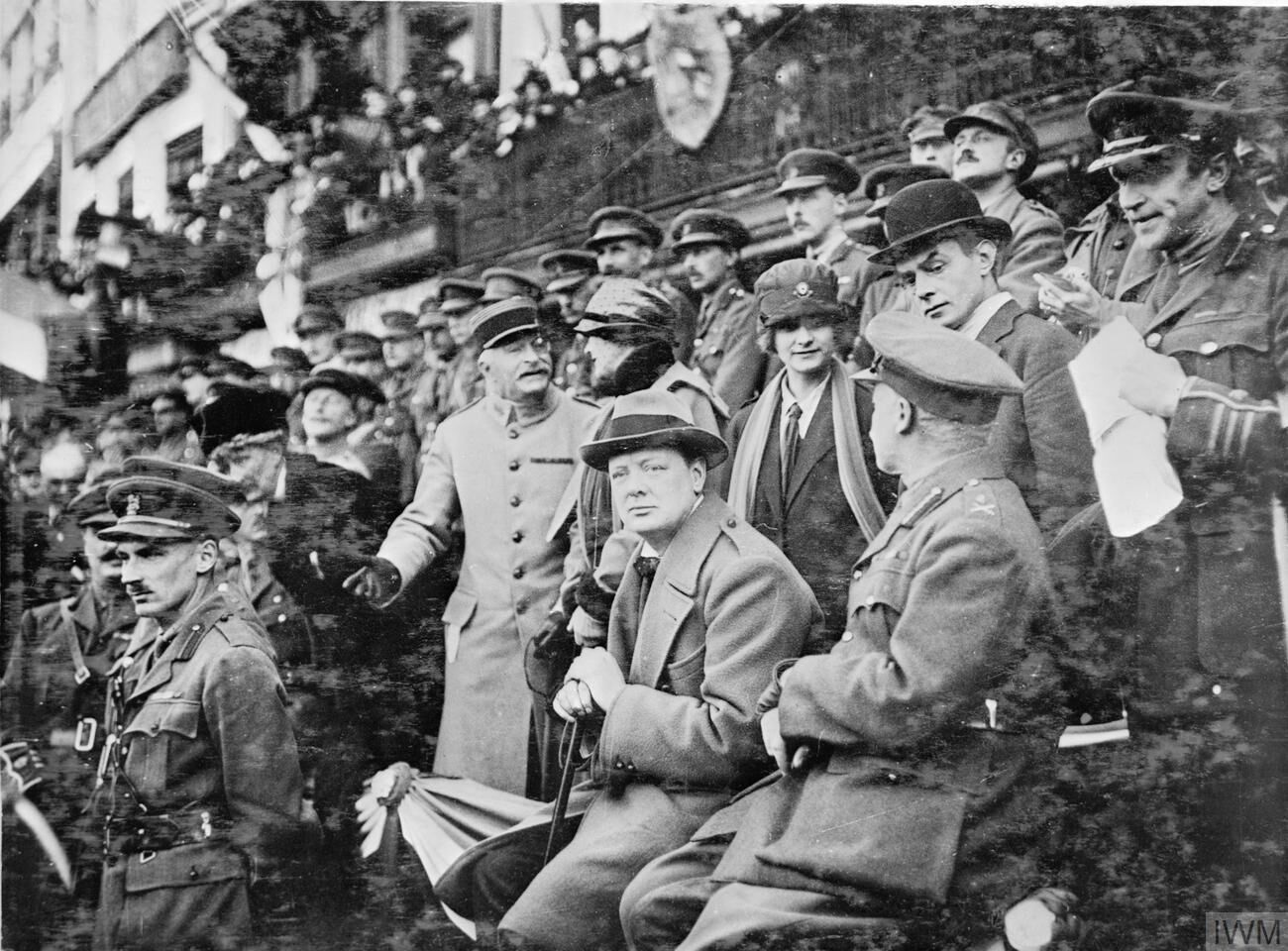
The Minister of Munitions, Winston Churchill, watching the march past of the 47th (2nd London) Division in the Grande Place, Lille, France, October 1918. In front of him is the 47th Division's GSO1, Lieutenant Colonel Bernard Montgomery.

It was in this role that Montgomery served at the Battle of Passchendaele which began in late July 1917. He was promoted to the temporary rank of major in February 1918, and brevet major in June. He finished the war in November 1918 as GSO1 (effectively chief of staff) of the 47th (2nd London) Division, with the temporary rank of lieutenant colonel, to which appointment and rank he had been assigned on 16 July. A photograph from October 1918, reproduced in many biographies, shows the then unknown Lieutenant-Colonel Montgomery standing in front of Winston Churchill (then the minister of munitions) at the parade following the liberation of Lille.

Montgomery was profoundly influenced by his experiences during the war, in particular by the lack of leadership displayed by senior commanders. He later wrote:

There was little contact between the generals and the soldiers. I went through the whole war on the Western Front, except during the period I was in England after being wounded; I never once saw the British Commander-in-Chief, neither French nor Haig, and only twice did I see an Army Commander.

The higher staffs were out of touch with the regimental officers and with the troops. The former lived in comfort, which became greater as the distance of their headquarters behind the lines increased. There was no harm in this provided there was touch and sympathy between the staff and the troops. This was often lacking. At most large headquarters in back areas the doctrine seemed to me to be that the troops existed for the benefit of the staff. My war experience led me to believe that the staff must be the servant of the troops, and that a good staff officer must serve his commander and the troops but himself be anonymous.

The frightful casualties appalled me. The so-called "good fighting generals" of the war appeared to me to be those who had a complete disregard for human life. There were of course exceptions and I suppose one such was Plumer; I had only once seen him and had never spoken to him.

== Between the world wars ==
=== 1920s and Ireland ===
After the First World War, Montgomery commanded the 17th (Service) Battalion of the Royal Fusiliers, a battalion in the British Army of the Rhine, before reverting to his substantive rank of captain (brevet major) in November 1919. He had not at first been selected for the Staff College, Camberley, Surrey (his only hope of ever achieving high command). But at a tennis party in Cologne, he was able to persuade the commander-in-chief (C-in-C) of the British Army of Occupation, Field Marshal Sir William Robertson, to add his name to the list.

After graduating from the Staff College, he was appointed brigade major in the 17th Infantry Brigade in January 1921. The brigade was stationed in County Cork, Ireland, carrying out counter-guerilla operations during the final stages of the Irish War of Independence.

In one noteworthy incident on 2 May 1922, Montgomery led a force of 60 soldiers and four armoured cars to the town of Macroom to search for four British officers who were missing in the area. While he had hoped the show of force would assist in finding the men, he was under strict orders not to attack the IRA. On arriving in the town square in front of Macroom Castle, he summoned the IRA commander, Charlie Browne, to parley. At the castle gates Montgomery spoke to Browne, explaining what would happen should the officers not be released. Once finished, Browne responded with his own ultimatum to Montgomery to "leave town within 10 minutes". Browne then turned heels and returned to the Castle. At this point another IRA officer, Pat O'Sullivan, whistled to Montgomery drawing his attention to scores of IRA volunteers who had quietly taken up firing positions all around the square—surrounding Montgomery's forces. Realising his precarious position, Montgomery led his troops out of the town, a decision which raised hostile questions in the House of Commons but was later approved by Montgomery's own superiors. Unknown to Montgomery at this time, the four missing officers had already been killed by the IRA.

Montgomery eventually came to the conclusion that only ruthless measures would suppress the rebels, and because that was politically unacceptable, self-government for Ireland was the only feasible option. In 1923, after the establishment of the Irish Free State and during the Irish Civil War, Montgomery wrote to Colonel Arthur Percival of the Essex Regiment:

Personally, my whole attention was given to defeating the rebels but it never bothered me a bit how many houses were burnt. I think I regarded all civilians as 'Shinners' and I never had any dealings with any of them. My own view is that to win a war of this sort, you must be ruthless. Oliver Cromwell, or the Germans, would have settled it in a very short time. Nowadays public opinion precludes such methods, the nation would never allow it, and the politicians would lose their jobs if they sanctioned it. That being so, I consider that Lloyd George was right in what he did, if we had gone on we could probably have squashed the rebellion as a temporary measure, but it would have broken out again like an ulcer the moment we removed the troops. I think the rebels would probably have refused battles, and hidden their arms etc. until we had gone. The only way therefore was to give them some form of self government, and let them squash the rebellion themselves, they are the only people who could really stamp it out.

In May 1923, Montgomery was posted to the 49th (West Riding) Infantry Division, a Territorial Army (TA) formation. He returned to the 1st Battalion, Royal Warwickshire Regiment in 1925 as a company commander and was promoted to major in July 1925. From January 1926 to January 1929 he served as deputy assistant adjutant general at the Staff College, Camberley, in the temporary rank of lieutenant-colonel.

=== Marriage and family ===
In 1925, in his first known courtship of a woman, Montgomery, then in his late thirties, proposed to a 17-year-old girl, Betty Anderson. His approach included drawing diagrams in the sand of how he would deploy his tanks and infantry in a future war, a contingency which seemed very remote at that time. She respected his ambition and single-mindedness but declined his proposal.

In 1927, he met and married Elizabeth (Betty) Carver, née Hobart. She was the sister of the future Second World War commander Sir Percy Hobart. Betty Carver had two sons in their early teens, John and Dick, from her first marriage to Oswald Carver. Dick Carver later wrote that it had been "a very brave thing" for Montgomery to take on a widow with two children. Montgomery's son, David, was born in August 1928.

While on holiday in Burnham-on-Sea in Somerset in 1937, Betty suffered an insect bite which became infected, and she died in her husband's arms from septicaemia following amputation of her leg. The loss devastated Montgomery, who was then serving as a brigadier, but he insisted on throwing himself back into his work immediately after the funeral. Montgomery's marriage had been extremely happy. Much of his correspondence with his wife was destroyed when his quarters at Portsmouth were bombed during the Second World War. After Montgomery's death, John Carver wrote that his mother had arguably done the country a favour by keeping his personal oddities—his extreme single-mindedness, and his intolerance of and suspicion of the motives of others—within reasonable bounds long enough for him to have a chance of attaining high command.

Both of Montgomery's stepsons became army officers in the 1930s (both were serving in India at the time of their mother's death), and both served in the Second World War, each eventually attaining the rank of colonel. While serving as a GSO2 with Eighth Army, Dick Carver was sent forward during the pursuit after El Alamein to help identify a new site for Eighth Army HQ. He was taken prisoner at Mersa Matruh on 7 November 1942. Montgomery wrote to his contacts in England asking that inquiries be made via the Red Cross as to where his stepson was being held, and that parcels be sent to him. Like many British POWs, the most famous being General Richard O'Connor, Dick Carver escaped in September 1943 during the brief hiatus between Italy's departure from the war and the German seizure of the country. He eventually reached British lines on 5 December 1943, to the delight of his stepfather, who sent him home to Britain to recuperate.

=== 1930s ===
In January 1929, Montgomery was promoted to brevet lieutenant-colonel. That month he returned to the 1st Battalion, Royal Warwickshire Regiment again, as commander of Headquarters Company; he went to the War Office to help write the Infantry Training Manual in mid-1929. In 1931 Montgomery was promoted to substantive lieutenant-colonel and became the commanding officer (CO) of the 1st Battalion, Royal Warwickshire Regiment and saw service in Palestine and British India. He was promoted to colonel in June 1934 (seniority from January 1932). He attended and was then recommended to become an instructor at the Indian Army Staff College (now the Pakistan Command and Staff College) in Quetta, British India.

On completion of his tour of duty in India, Montgomery returned to Britain in June 1937 where he took command of the 9th Infantry Brigade with the temporary rank of brigadier. His wife died that year.

In 1938, he organised an amphibious combined operations landing exercise that impressed the new C-in-C of Southern Command, General Sir Archibald Wavell. He was promoted to major-general on 14 October 1938 and took command of the 8th Infantry Division in the British mandate of Palestine. In Palestine, Montgomery was involved in suppressing an Arab revolt which had broken out over opposition to Jewish emigration. He returned in July 1939 to Britain, suffering a serious illness on the way, to command the 3rd Infantry Division. Reporting the suppression of the revolt in April 1939, Montgomery wrote, "I shall be sorry to leave Palestine in many ways, as I have enjoyed the war out here".

== Second World War ==
=== British Expeditionary Force ===
==== Phoney war ====
Britain declared war on Germany on 3 September 1939 and the 3rd Division, together with its new general officer commanding (GOC), was deployed to France as part of the British Expeditionary Force (BEF), commanded by General Lord Gort. Shortly after the division's arrival overseas, Montgomery faced serious trouble from his military superiors and the clergy for his frank attitude regarding the sexual health of his soldiers, but was defended from dismissal by his superior Alan Brooke, commander of II Corps, of which Montgomery's division formed a part. Montgomery had issued a circular on the prevention of venereal disease, worded in such "obscene language" that both the Church of England and Roman Catholic senior chaplains objected; Brooke told Monty that he did not want any further errors of this kind, though deciding not to get him to formally withdraw it as it would remove any "vestige of respect" left for him.

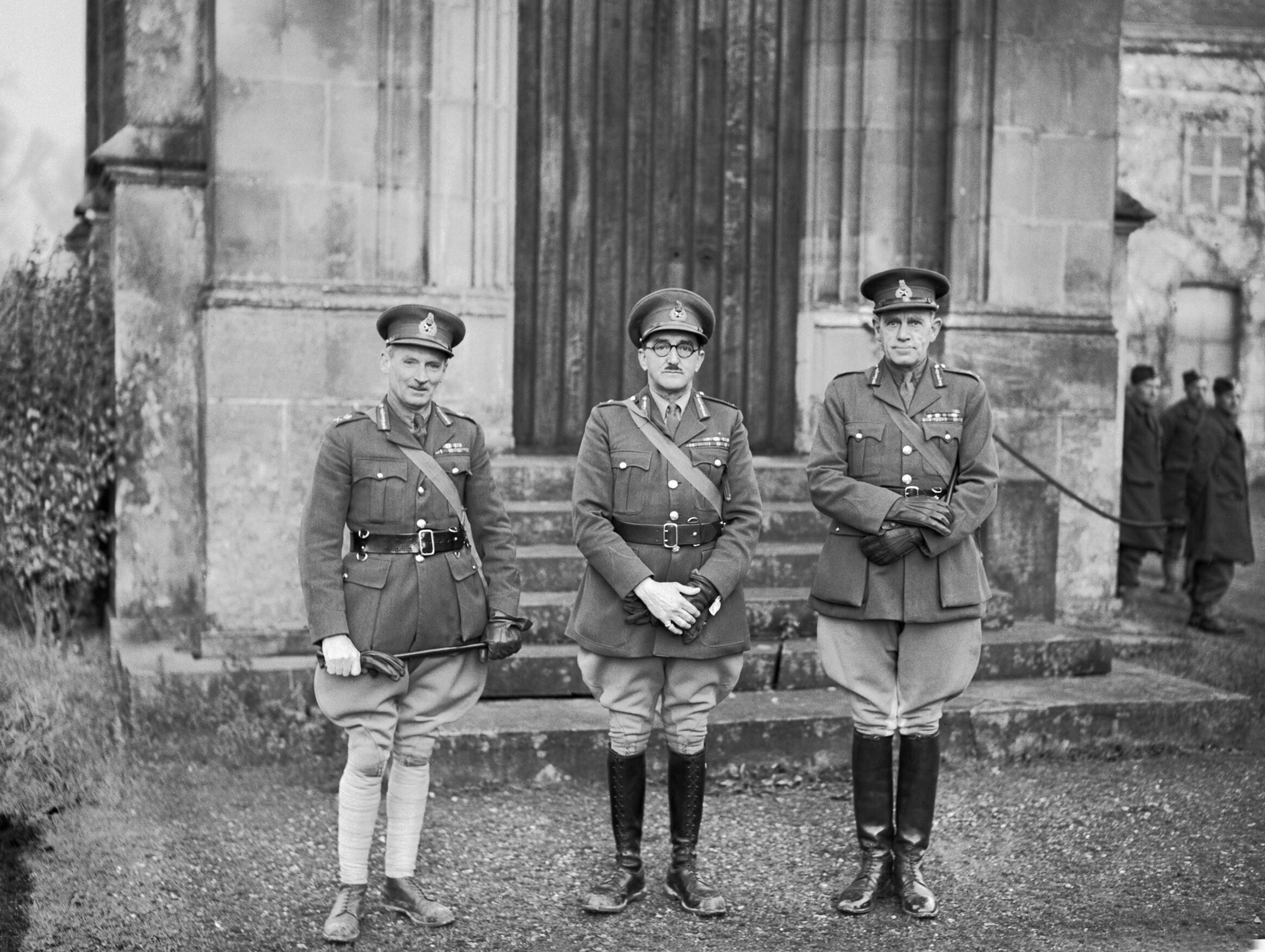
Lieutenant-general Alan Brooke, GOC II Corps, with Major-general Bernard Montgomery, GOC 3rd Division, and Major-general Dudley Johnson, GOC 4th Infantry Division, pictured here in either 1939 or 1940

Although Montgomery's new command was a Regular Army formation, comprising the 7th (Guards), and the 8th and 9th Infantry Brigades along with supporting units, he was not impressed with its readiness for battle. As a result, while most of the rest of the BEF set about preparing defences for an expected German attack sometime in the future, Montgomery began training his 3rd Division in offensive tactics, organising several exercises, each of which lasted for several days at a time. Mostly they revolved around the division advancing towards an objective, often a river line, only to come under attack and forced to withdraw to another position, usually behind another river. These exercises usually occurred at night with only very minimal lighting being allowed. By the spring of 1940 Montgomery's division had gained a reputation of being a very agile and flexible formation. By then the Allies had agreed to Plan D, where they would advance deep into Belgium and take up positions on the River Dyle by the time the German forces attacked. Brooke, Montgomery's corps commander, was pessimistic about the plan but Montgomery, in contrast, was not concerned, believing that he and his division would perform well regardless of the circumstances, particularly in a war of movement.

==== Battle of France ====
Montgomery's training paid off when the Germans began their invasion of the Low Countries on 10 May 1940 and the 3rd Division advanced to its planned position, near the Belgian city of Leuven. Soon after arrival, the division was fired on by members of the Belgian 10th Infantry Division who mistook them for German paratroopers; Montgomery resolved the incident by approaching them and offering to place himself under Belgian command, although Montgomery himself took control when the Germans arrived. During this time he began to develop a particular habit, which he would keep throughout the war, of going to bed at 21:30 every night without fail and giving only a single order—that he was not to be disturbed—which was only very rarely disobeyed.

The 3rd Division saw comparatively little action but, owing to the strict training methods of Montgomery, the division always managed to be in the right place at the right time, especially so during the retreat into France. By 27 May, when the Belgian Army on the left flank of the BEF began to disintegrate, the 3rd Division achieved something very difficult, the movement at night from the right to the left of another division and only 2,000 yards behind it. This was performed with great professionalism and occurred without any incidents and thereby filled a very vulnerable gap in the BEF's defensive line. On 29/30 May, Montgomery temporarily took over from Brooke, who received orders to return to the United Kingdom, as GOC of II Corps for the final stages of the Dunkirk evacuation.

The 3rd Division, temporarily commanded by Kenneth Anderson in Montgomery's absence, returned to Britain intact with minimal casualties. Operation Dynamo—codename for the Dunkirk evacuation—saw 330,000 Allied military personnel, including most of the BEF, to Britain, although the BEF was forced to leave behind a significant amount of equipment.

=== Service in the United Kingdom 1940−1942 ===
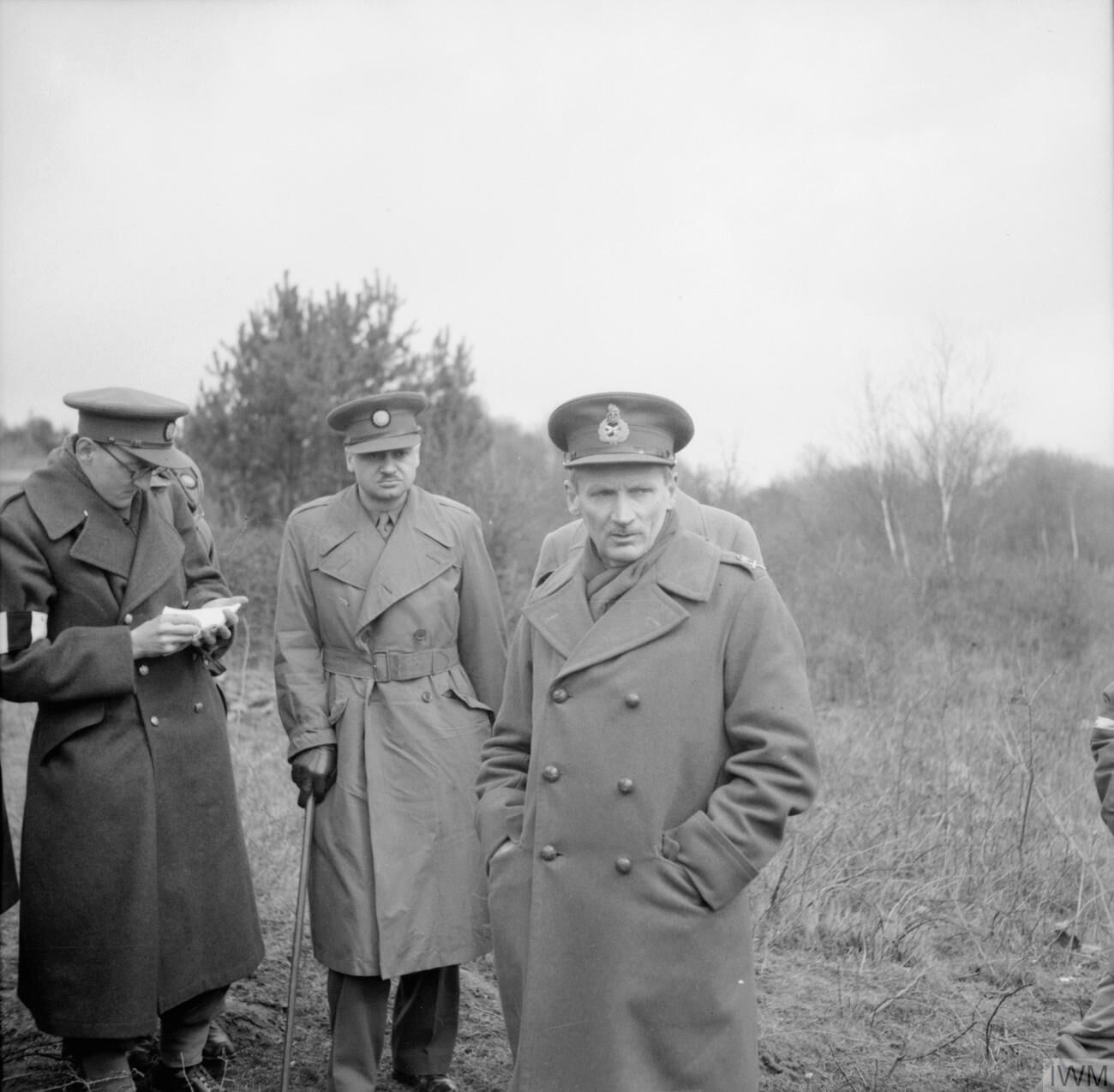
Montgomery, GOC V Corps, with war correspondents during a large-scale exercise in Southern Command, March 1941

On his return Montgomery antagonised the War Office with trenchant criticisms of the command of the BEF and was briefly relegated to divisional command of 3rd Division, which was the only fully equipped division in Britain. He was made a Companion of the Order of the Bath.

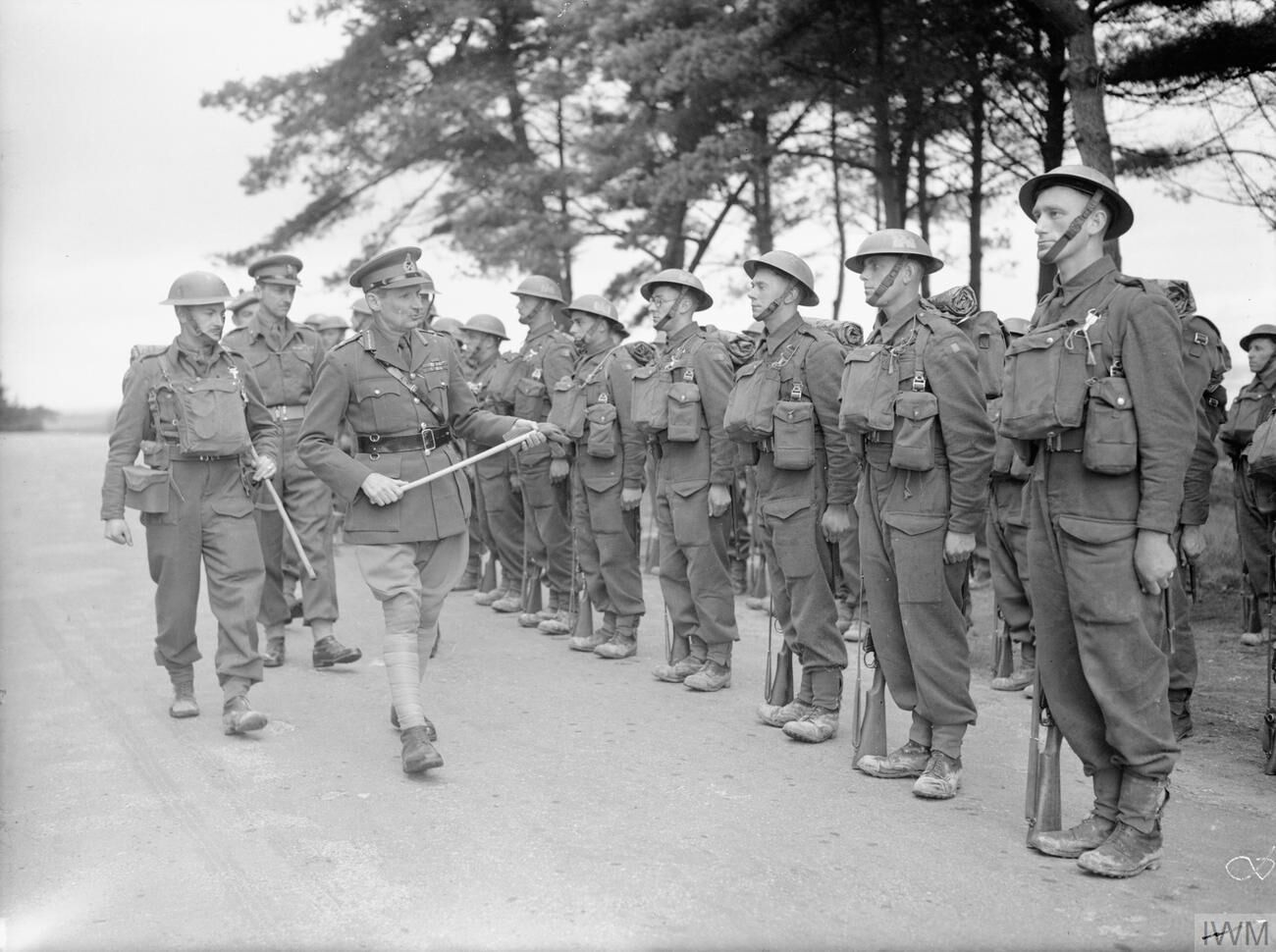
Montgomery inspecting men of the 7th Battalion, Suffolk Regiment, at Sandbanks near Poole, Dorset, 22 March 1941. To his right, wearing a peaked cap, is Brigadier Gerald Templer, commanding the 210th Brigade, the 7th Suffolks' parent formation.

Montgomery was ordered to make ready the 3rd Division to invade the neutral Portuguese Azores. Models of the islands were prepared and detailed plans worked out for the invasion. The invasion plans did not go ahead and plans switched to invading the Cape Verde islands also belonging to neutral Portugal. These invasion plans also did not go ahead. Montgomery was then ordered to prepare plans for the invasion of neutral Ireland and to seize Cork, Cobh and Cork harbour. These invasion plans, like those of the Portuguese islands, also did not go ahead and in July 1940, Montgomery was appointed acting lieutenant-general and after handing over command of his division to James Gammell, he was placed in command of V Corps, responsible for the defence of Hampshire and Dorset and started a long-running feud with the new commander-in-chief (C-in-C) of Southern Command, Lieutenant-general Claude Auchinleck.

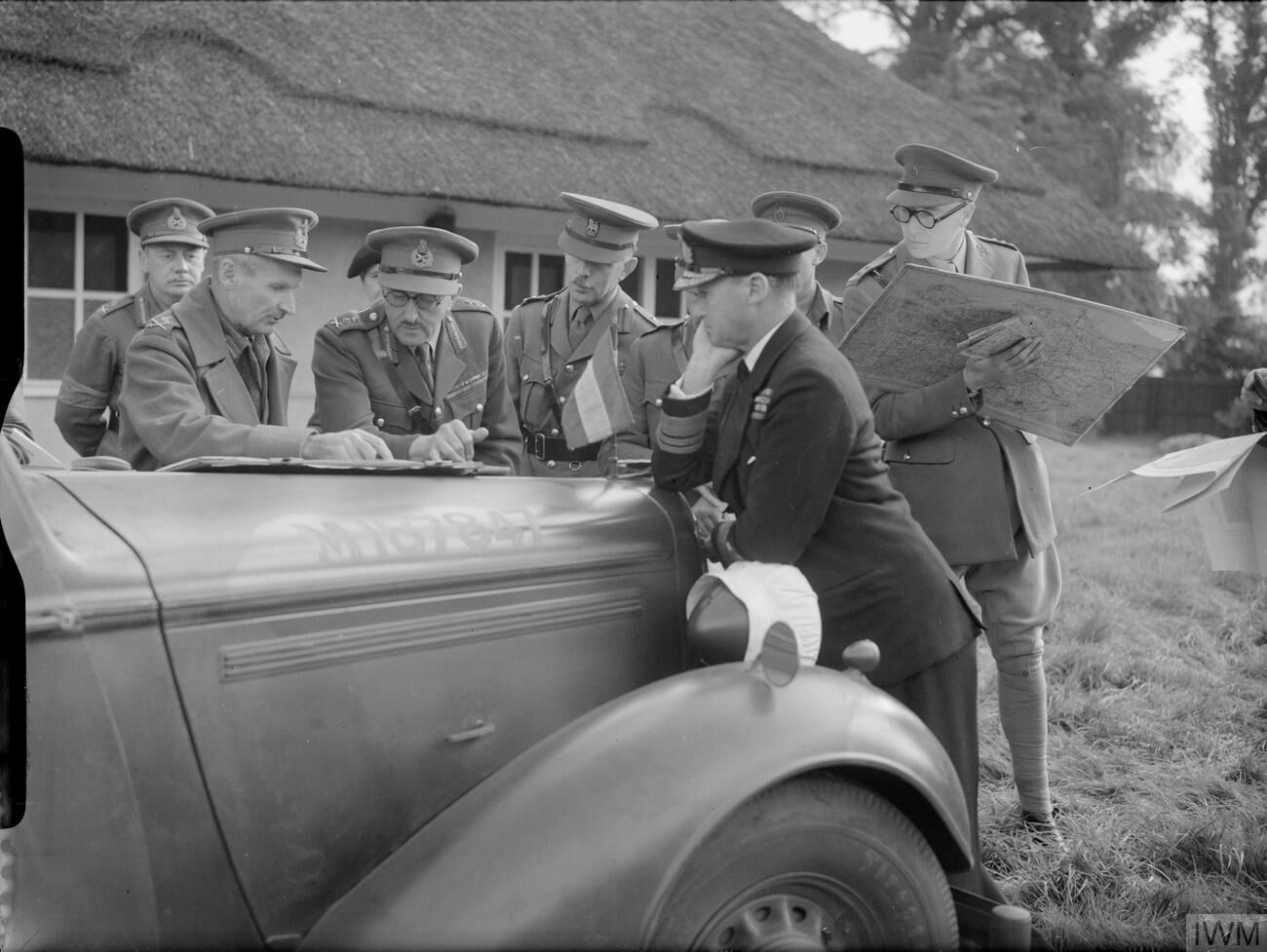
During Exercise 'Bumper' on 2 October 1941 Montgomery, the Chief Umpire, talks to General Sir Alan Brooke (C-in-C Home Forces).

In April 1941, he became commander of XII Corps responsible for the defence of Kent. During this period he instituted a regime of continuous training and insisted on high levels of physical fitness for both officers and other ranks. He was ruthless in sacking officers he considered unfit for command in action. He was promoted to temporary lieutenant-general in July, overseeing the defence of Kent, Sussex and Surrey. In December Montgomery was given command of South-Eastern Command. He renamed his command the South-Eastern Army to promote offensive spirit. During this time he further developed and rehearsed his ideas and trained his soldiers, culminating in Exercise Tiger in May 1942, a combined forces exercise involving 100,000 troops.

=== North Africa and Italy ===
==== Montgomery's early command ====
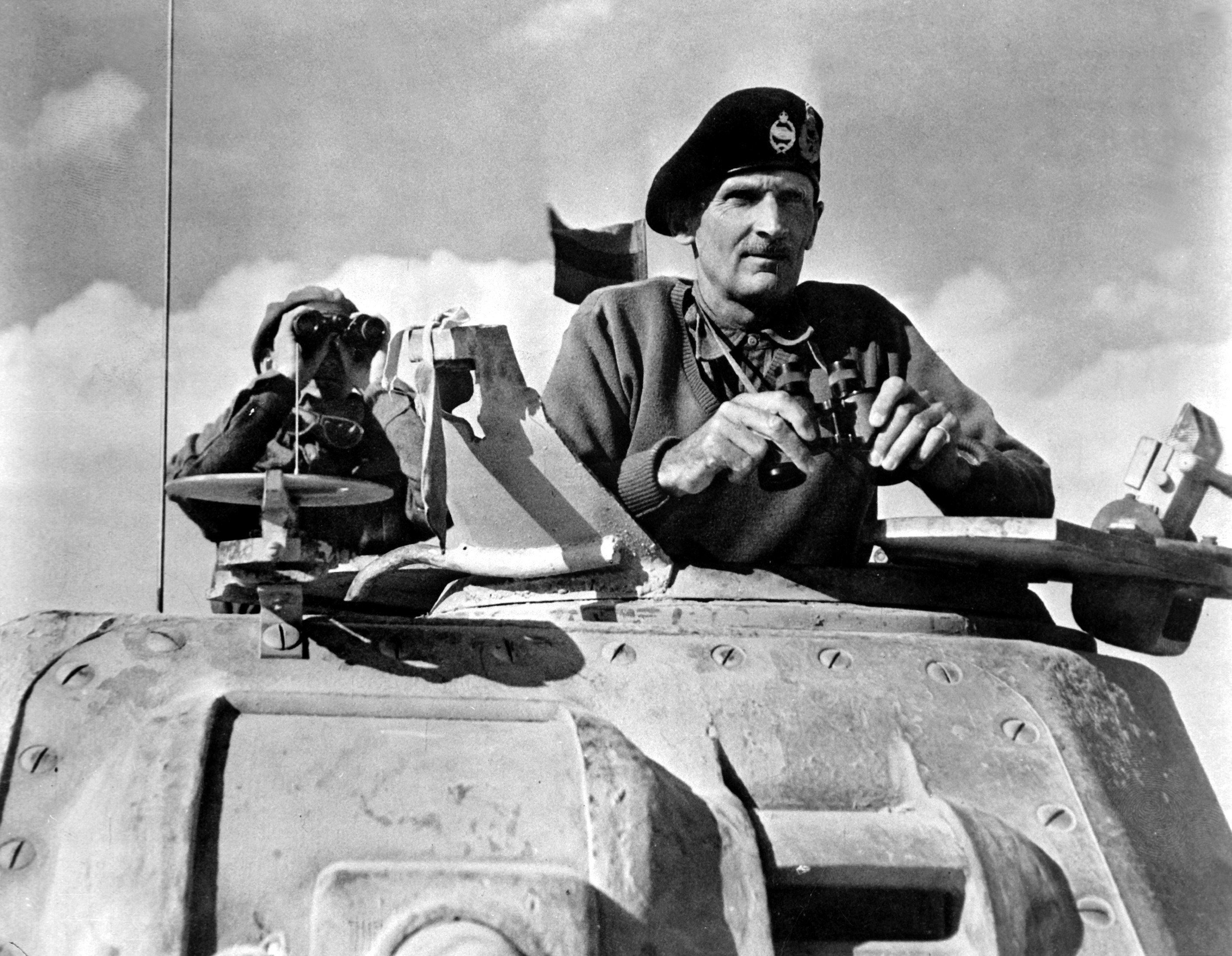
Montgomery in a Grant tank in North Africa, November 1942

In 1942, a new field commander was required in the Middle East, where Auchinleck was fulfilling both the role of C-in-C of Middle East Command and commander Eighth Army. He had stabilised the Allied position at the First Battle of El Alamein, but after a visit in August 1942, the Prime Minister, Winston Churchill, replaced him as C-in-C with General Sir Harold Alexander and William Gott as commander of the Eighth Army in the Western Desert. However, after Gott was killed flying back to Cairo, Churchill was persuaded by Brooke, who by this time was Chief of the Imperial General Staff (CIGS), to appoint Montgomery, who had only just been nominated to replace Alexander, as commander of the British First Army for Operation Torch, the invasion of French North Africa.

A story, probably apocryphal but popular at the time, is that the appointment caused Montgomery to remark that "After having an easy war, things have now got much more difficult." A colleague is supposed to have told him to cheer up—at which point Montgomery said "I'm not talking about me, I'm talking about Rommel!"

He ordered the creation of the X Corps, which contained all armoured divisions, to fight alongside his XXX Corps, which was all infantry divisions. This arrangement differed from the German Panzer Corps: one of Rommel's Panzer Corps combined infantry, armour and artillery units under one corps commander. The only common commander for Montgomery's all-infantry and all-armour corps was the Eighth Army commander himself. Writing post-war the English historian Correlli Barnett commented that Montgomery's solution "was in every way opposite to Auchinleck's and in every way wrong, for it carried the existing dangerous separatism still further."

Montgomery reinforced the 30 miles (48 km) long front line at El Alamein, something that would take two months to accomplish. He asked Alexander to send him two new British divisions (51st Highland and 44th Home Counties) that were then arriving in Egypt and were scheduled to be deployed in defence of the Nile Delta. He moved his field HQ to Burg al Arab, close to the Air Force command post in order to better coordinate combined operations.

Montgomery was determined that the army, navy and air forces should fight their battles in a unified, focused manner according to a detailed plan. He ordered immediate reinforcement of the vital heights of Alam Halfa, just behind his own lines, expecting the German commander, Erwin Rommel, to attack with the heights as his objective, something that Rommel soon did. Montgomery ordered all contingency plans for retreat to be destroyed. "I have cancelled the plan for withdrawal. If we are attacked, then there will be no retreat. If we cannot stay here alive, then we will stay here dead", he told his officers at the first meeting he held with them in the desert, though, in fact, Auchinleck had no plans to withdraw from the strong defensive position he had chosen and established at El Alamein.

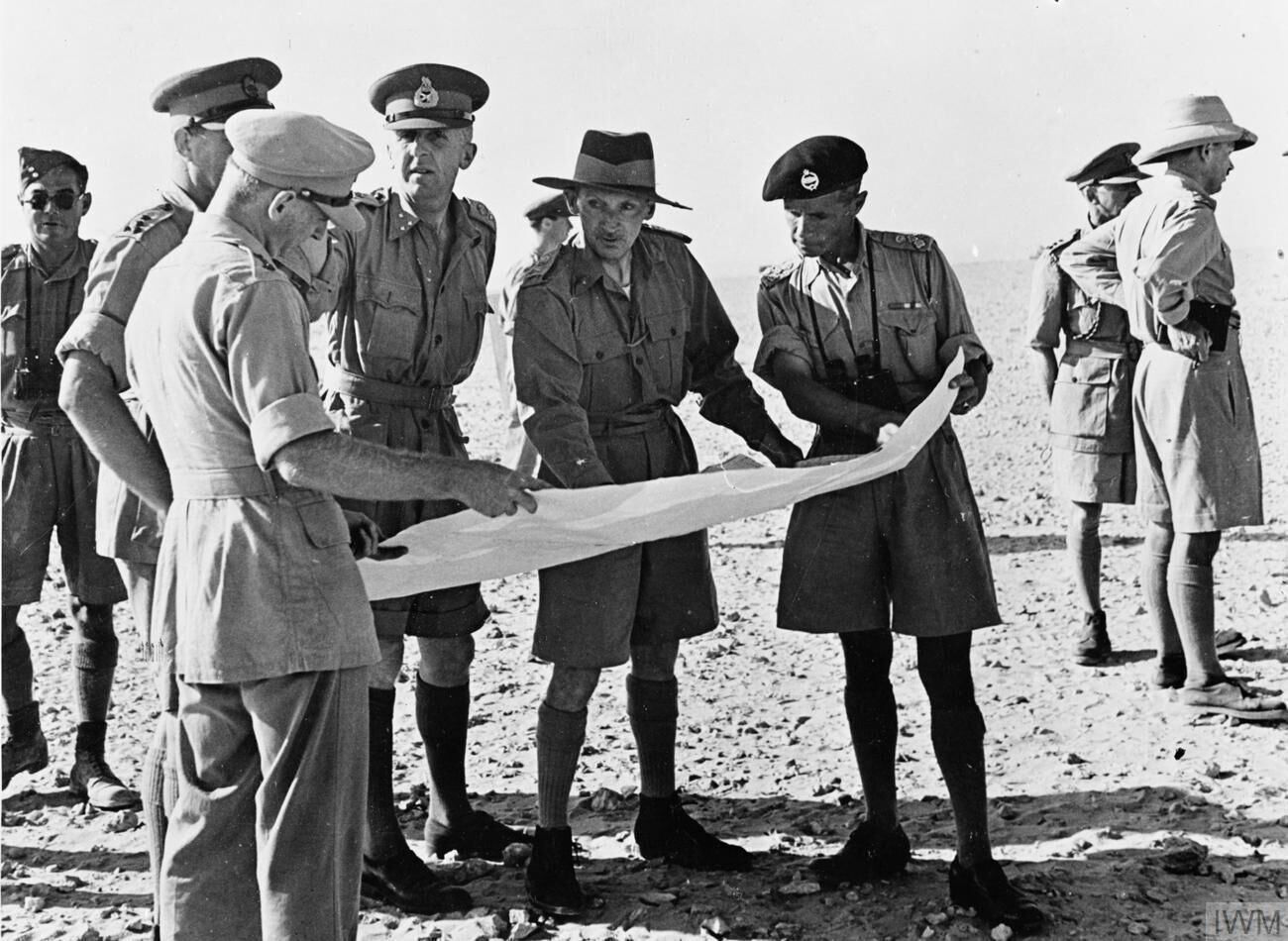
Lieutenant-general Bernard Montgomery, the new commander of the British Eighth Army, and Lieutenant-general Brian Horrocks, the new GOC XIII Corps, discussing troop dispositions at 22nd Armoured Brigade HQ, 20 August 1942. The brigade commander, Brigadier George Roberts is on the right (in beret).

Montgomery made a great effort to appear before troops as often as possible, frequently visiting various units and making himself known to the men, often arranging for cigarettes to be distributed. Although he still wore a standard British officer's cap on arrival in the desert, he briefly wore an Australian broad-brimmed hat before switching to wearing the black beret (with the badge of the Royal Tank Regiment and the British General Officer's cap badge) for which he became notable. The black beret was offered to him by Jim Fraser while the latter was driving him on an inspection tour. Both Brooke and Alexander were astonished by the transformation in atmosphere when they visited on 19 August, less than a week after Montgomery had taken command.

Alan Brooke said that Churchill was always impatient for his generals to attack at once, and he wrote that Montgomery was always "my Monty" when Montgomery was out of favour with Churchill. Anthony Eden had some late night drinks with Churchill, and Eden said at a meeting of the Chiefs of Staff the next day (29 October 1942) that the Middle East offensive was "petering out". Brooke had told Churchill "fairly plainly" what he thought of Eden's ability to judge the tactical situation from a distance, and was supported at the Chiefs of Staff meeting by Jan Smuts.

==== First battles with Rommel ====
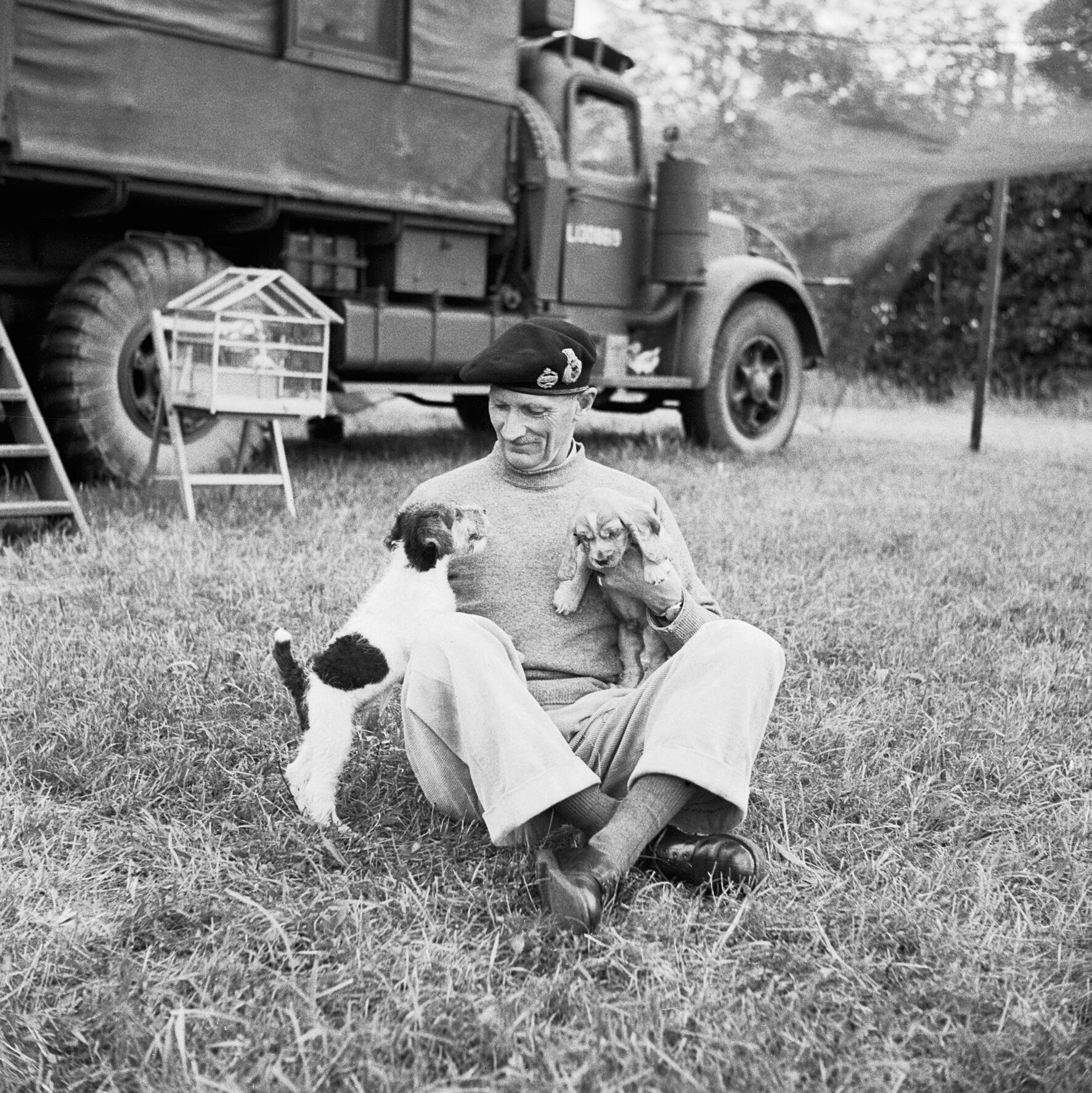
General Montgomery with his pets, the puppies "Hitler" (left) and "Rommel", and a cage of canaries which also travelled with him (at Blay, his second HQ in France in July 1944)

Rommel attempted to turn the left flank of the Eighth Army at the Battle of Alam el Halfa from 31 August 1942. The German/Italian armoured corps infantry attack was stopped in very heavy fighting. Rommel's forces had to withdraw urgently lest their retreat through the British minefields be cut off. Montgomery was criticised for not counter-attacking the retreating forces immediately, but he felt strongly that his methodical build-up of British forces was not yet ready. A hasty counter-attack risked ruining his strategy for an offensive on his own terms in late October, planning for which had begun soon after he took command. He was confirmed in the permanent rank of lieutenant-general in mid-October.

The conquest of Libya was essential for airfields to support Malta and to threaten the rear of Axis forces opposing Operation Torch. Montgomery prepared meticulously for the new offensive after convincing Churchill that the time was not being wasted. (Churchill sent a telegram to Alexander on 23 September 1942 which began, "We are in your hands and of course a victorious battle makes amends for much delay.") He was determined not to fight until he thought there had been sufficient preparation for a decisive victory, and put into action his beliefs with the gathering of resources, detailed planning, the training of troops—especially in clearing minefields and fighting at night—and in the use of 252 of the latest American-built Sherman tanks, 90 M7 Priest self-propelled howitzers, and making a personal visit to every unit involved in the offensive. By the time the offensive was ready in late October, Eighth Army had 231,000 men on its ration strength.

==== El Alamein ====
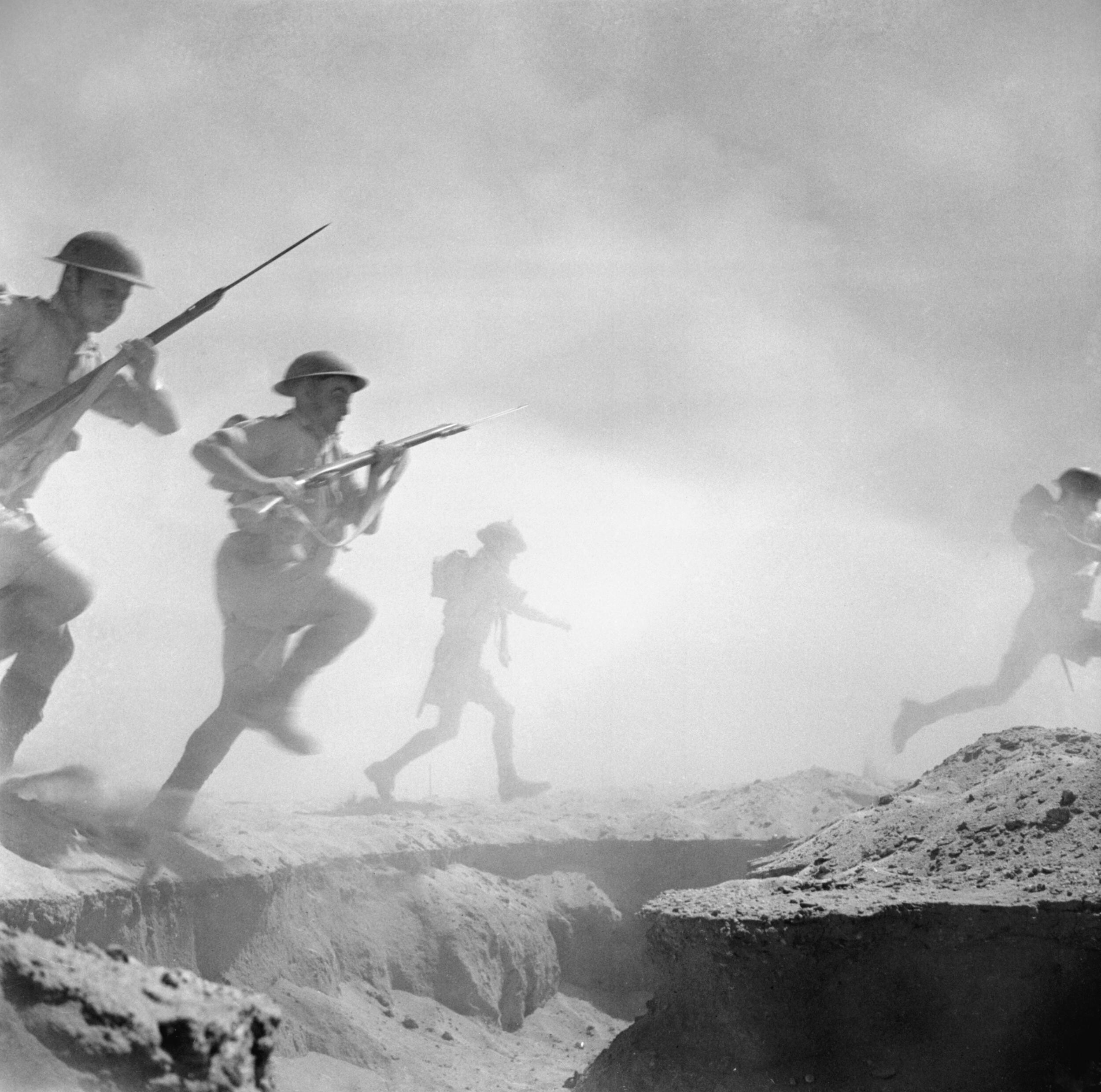
Men of the 9th Australian Division in a posed photograph during the Second Battle of El Alamein

The Second Battle of El Alamein began on 23 October 1942, and ended 12 days later with one of the first large-scale, decisive Allied land victories of the war. Montgomery correctly predicted both the length of the battle and the number of casualties (13,500).

Historian Correlli Barnett has pointed out that the rain also fell on the Germans, and that the weather is therefore an inadequate explanation for the failure to exploit the breakthrough, but nevertheless the Battle of El Alamein had been a great success. Over 30,000 prisoners of war were taken, including the German second-in-command, General Ritter von Thoma, as well as eight other general officers.

==== Tunisia ====
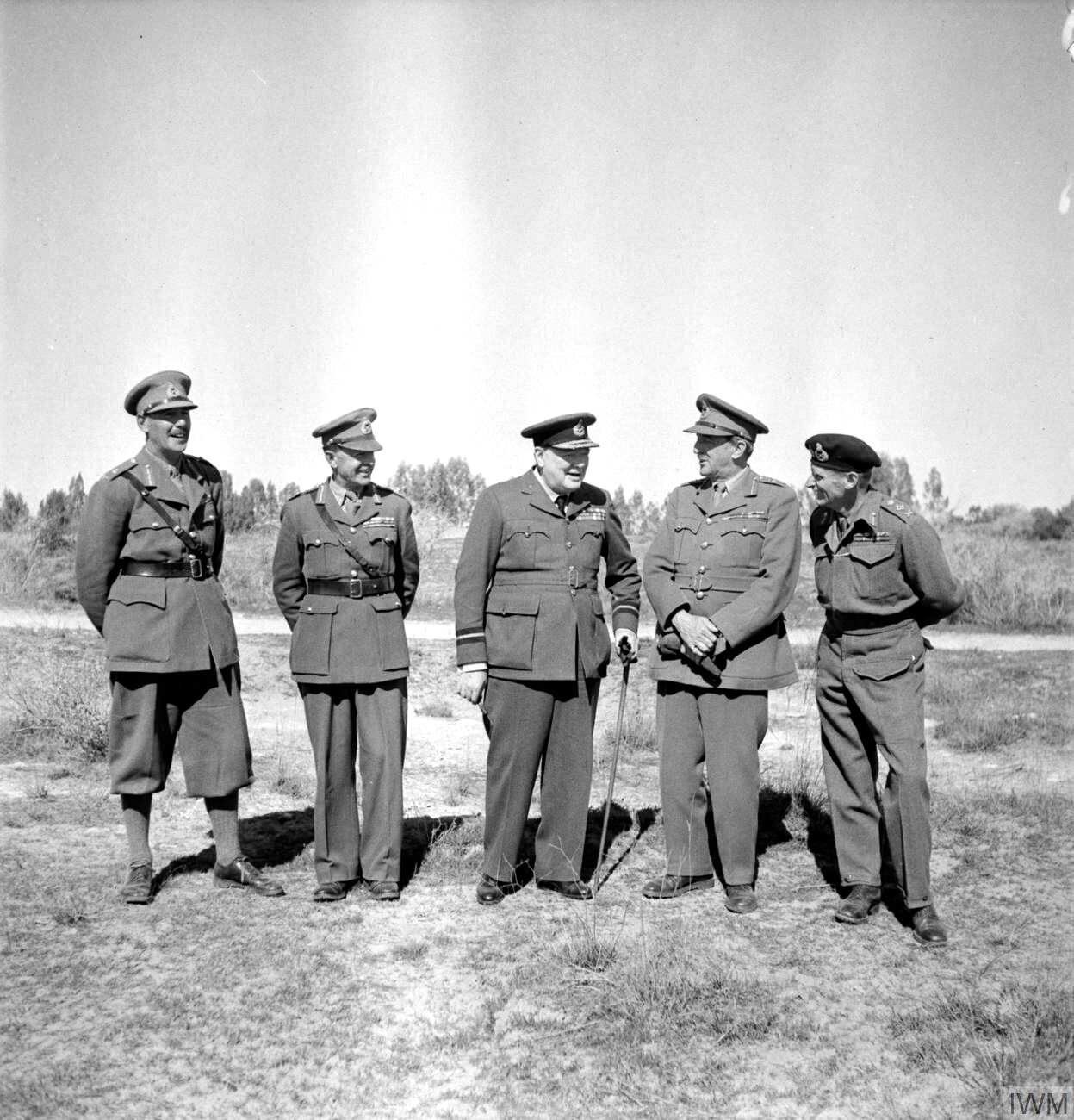
The British Prime Minister Winston Churchill with military leaders during his visit to Tripoli. The group includes: Lieutenant-general Sir Oliver Leese, General Sir Harold Alexander, General Sir Alan Brooke and General Sir Bernard Montgomery.

Montgomery was advanced to KCB and promoted to full general. He kept the initiative, applying superior strength when it suited him, forcing Rommel out of each successive defensive position. On 6 March 1943, Rommel's attack on the over-extended Eighth Army at Medenine (Operation Capri) with the largest concentration of German armour in North Africa was successfully repulsed. At the Mareth Line, 20 to 27 March, when Montgomery encountered fiercer frontal opposition than he had anticipated, he switched his major effort into an outflanking inland pincer, backed by low-flying RAF fighter-bomber support. For his role in North Africa he was awarded the Legion of Merit by the United States government in the rank of chief commander.

==== Sicily ====
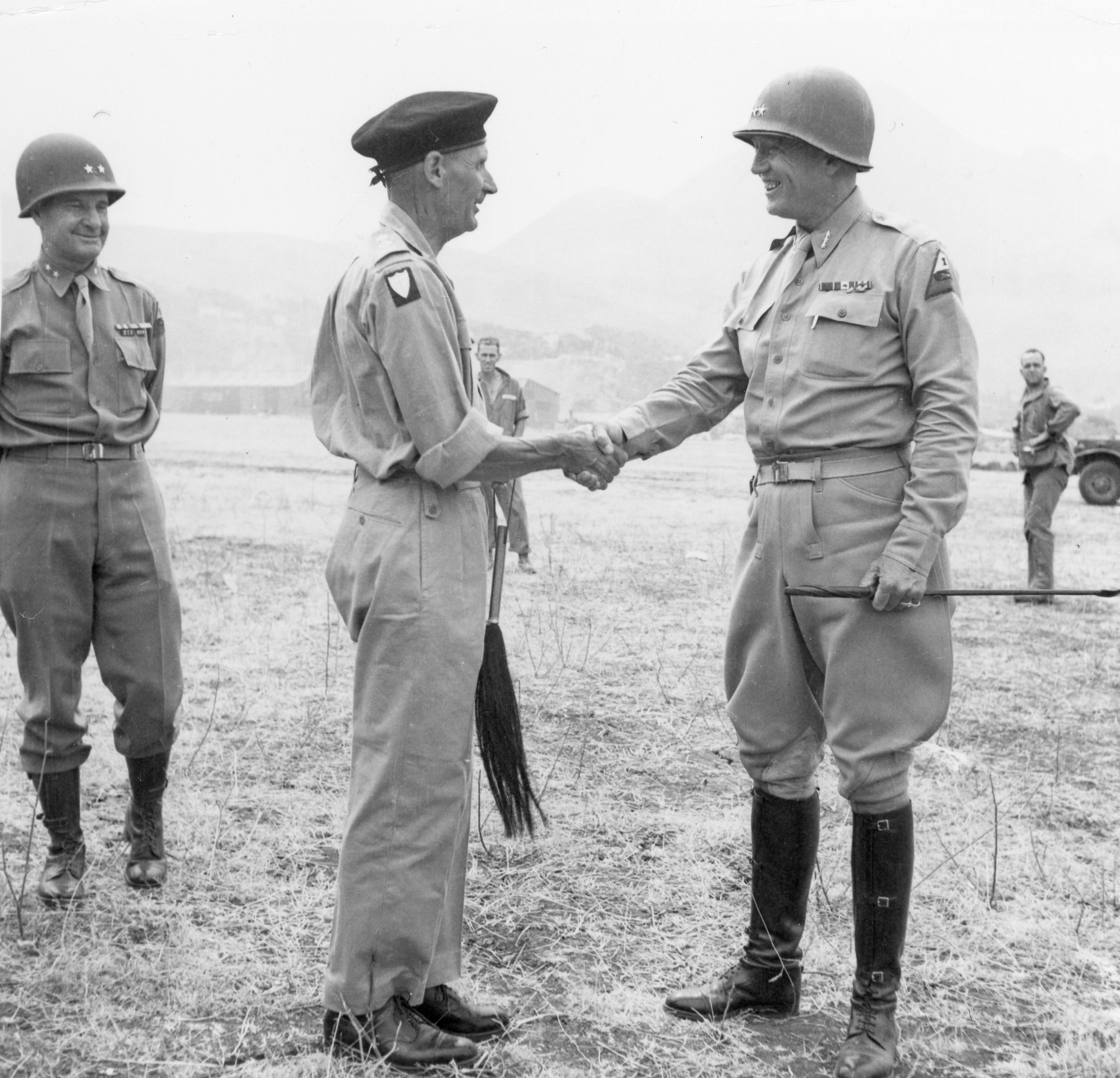
Montgomery visits Patton in Palermo, Sicily, July 1943. Geoffrey Keyes at far left.

The next major Allied attack was the Allied invasion of Sicily (Operation Husky). Montgomery considered the initial plans for the Allied invasion, which had been agreed in principle by General Dwight D. Eisenhower, the Supreme Allied Commander Allied Forces Headquarters, and General Alexander, the 15th Army Group commander, to be unworkable because of the dispersion of effort. He managed to have the plans recast to concentrate the Allied forces, having Lieutenant General George Patton's US Seventh Army land in the Gulf of Gela (on the Eighth Army's left flank, which landed around Syracuse in the south-east of Sicily) rather than near Palermo in the west and north of Sicily. Inter-Allied tensions grew as the American commanders, Patton and Omar Bradley (then commanding US II Corps under Patton), took umbrage at what they saw as Montgomery's attitudes and boastfulness. However, while they were considered three of the greatest soldiers of their time, due to their competitiveness they were renowned for "squabbling like three schoolgirls" thanks to their "bitchiness", "whining to their superiors" and "showing off".

==== Italy ====
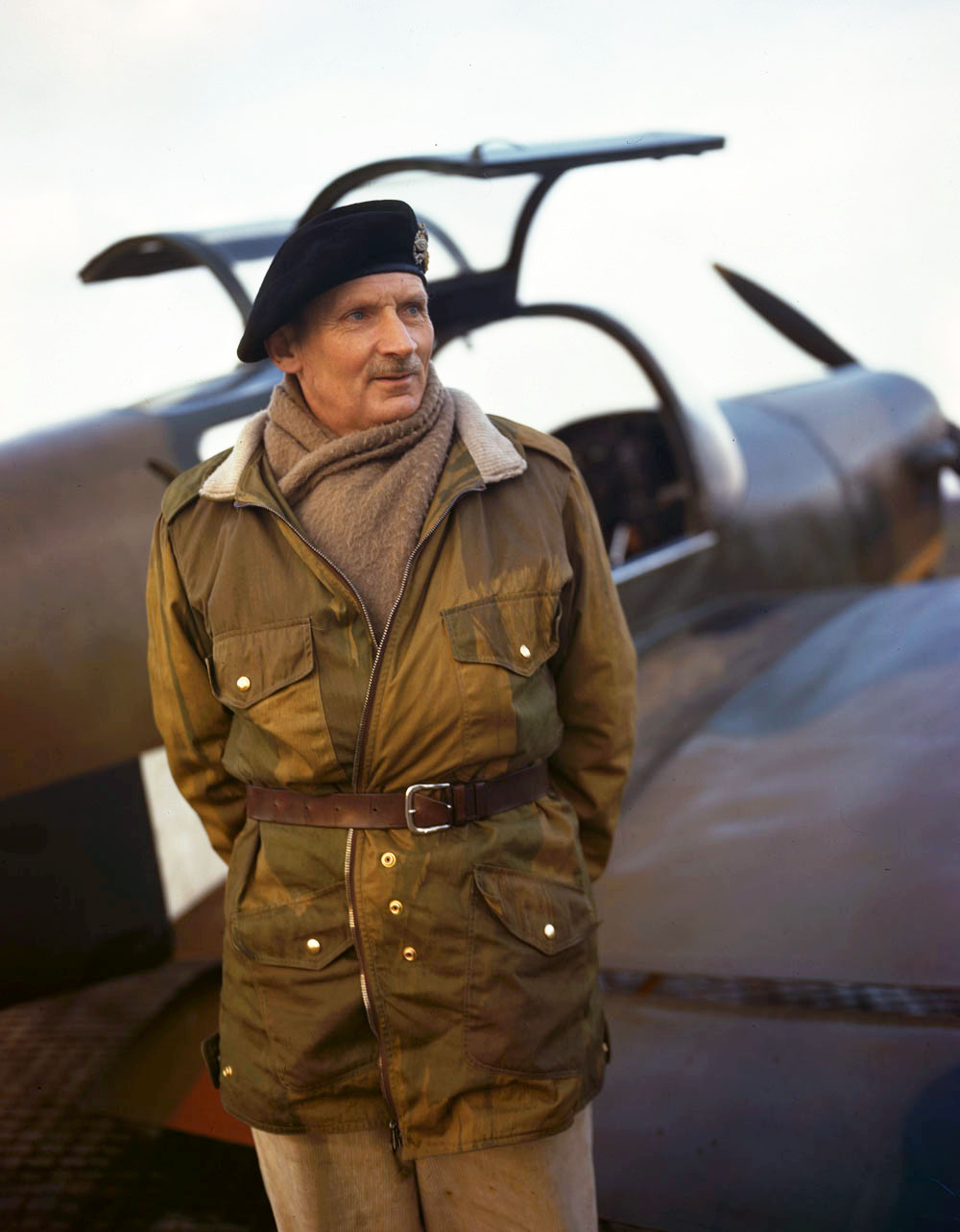
Wartime photograph of General Montgomery with his Miles Messenger aircraft (location and date unknown)

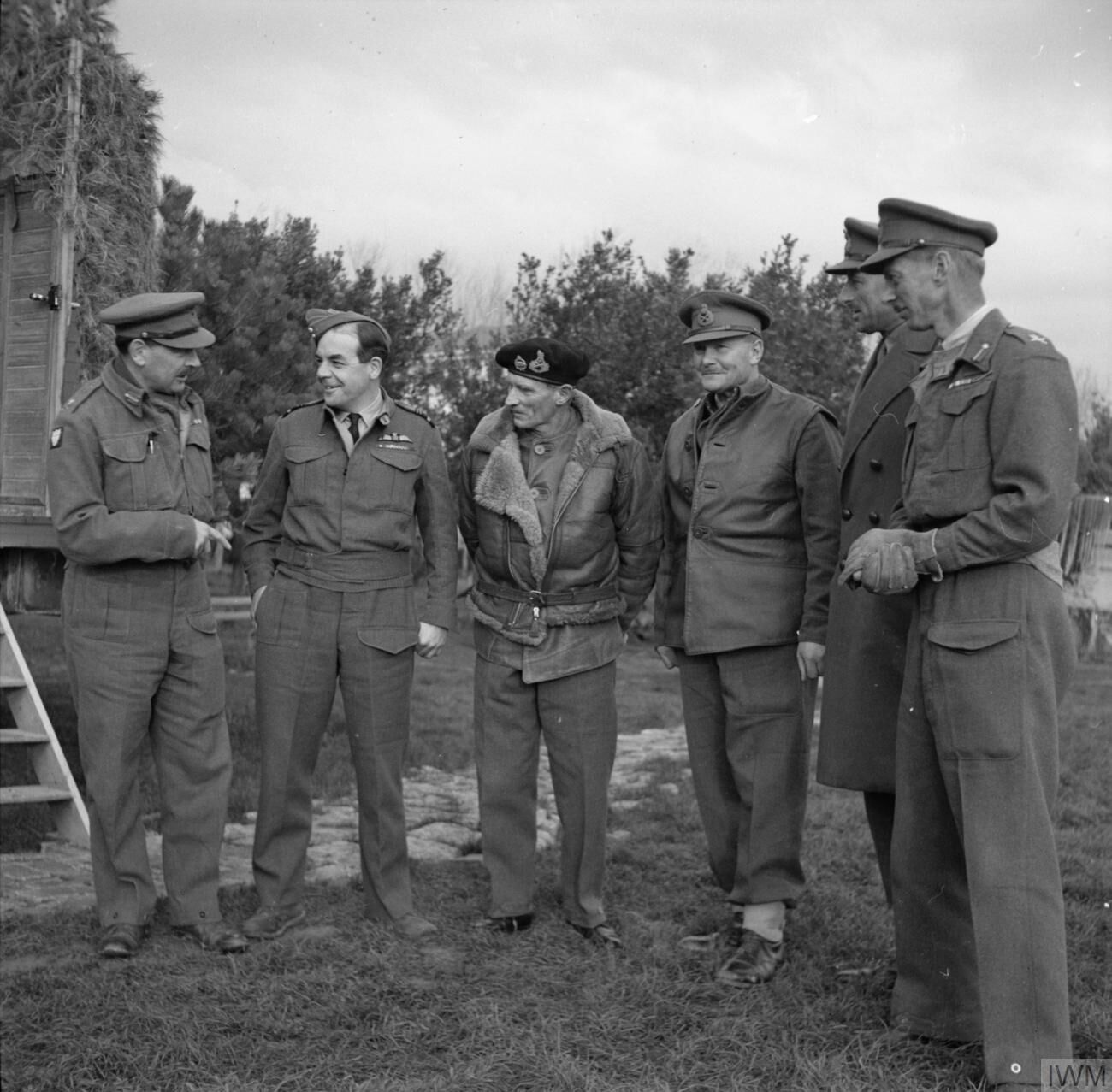
From left to right: Freddie de Guingand, Harry Broadhurst, Montgomery, Sir Bernard Freyberg, Miles Dempsey and Charles Allfrey

Montgomery's Eighth Army was then fully involved in the Allied invasion of Italy in early September 1943, becoming the first of the Allied forces to land in Western Europe. Led by Lieutenant General Sir Miles Dempsey's XIII Corps, the Eighth Army landed on the toe of Italy in Operation Baytown on 3 September, four years to the day after Britain declared war on Germany. They encountered little enemy resistance. The Germans had made the decision to fall back and did what they could to stall the Eighth Army's advance, including blowing up bridges, laying mines, and setting up booby-traps. All of these slowed the Army's advance north on the awful Italian roads, although it was Montgomery who was later much criticised for the lack of progress.

On 9 September the British 1st Airborne Division landed at the key port of Taranto in the heel of Italy as part of Operation Slapstick, capturing the port unopposed. On the same day the U.S. Fifth Army under Lieutenant General Mark W. Clark (which actually contained a large number of British troops) landed at Salerno, near Naples, as part of Operation Avalanche but soon found itself fighting for its very existence with the Germans launching several determined counterattacks to try to push the Allies back into the sea, with Montgomery's men being too far away to provide any real assistance. The situation was tense over the next few days but the two armies (both of which formed the 15th Army Group under General Alexander) finally began to meet on 16 September, by which time the crisis at Salerno was virtually over.

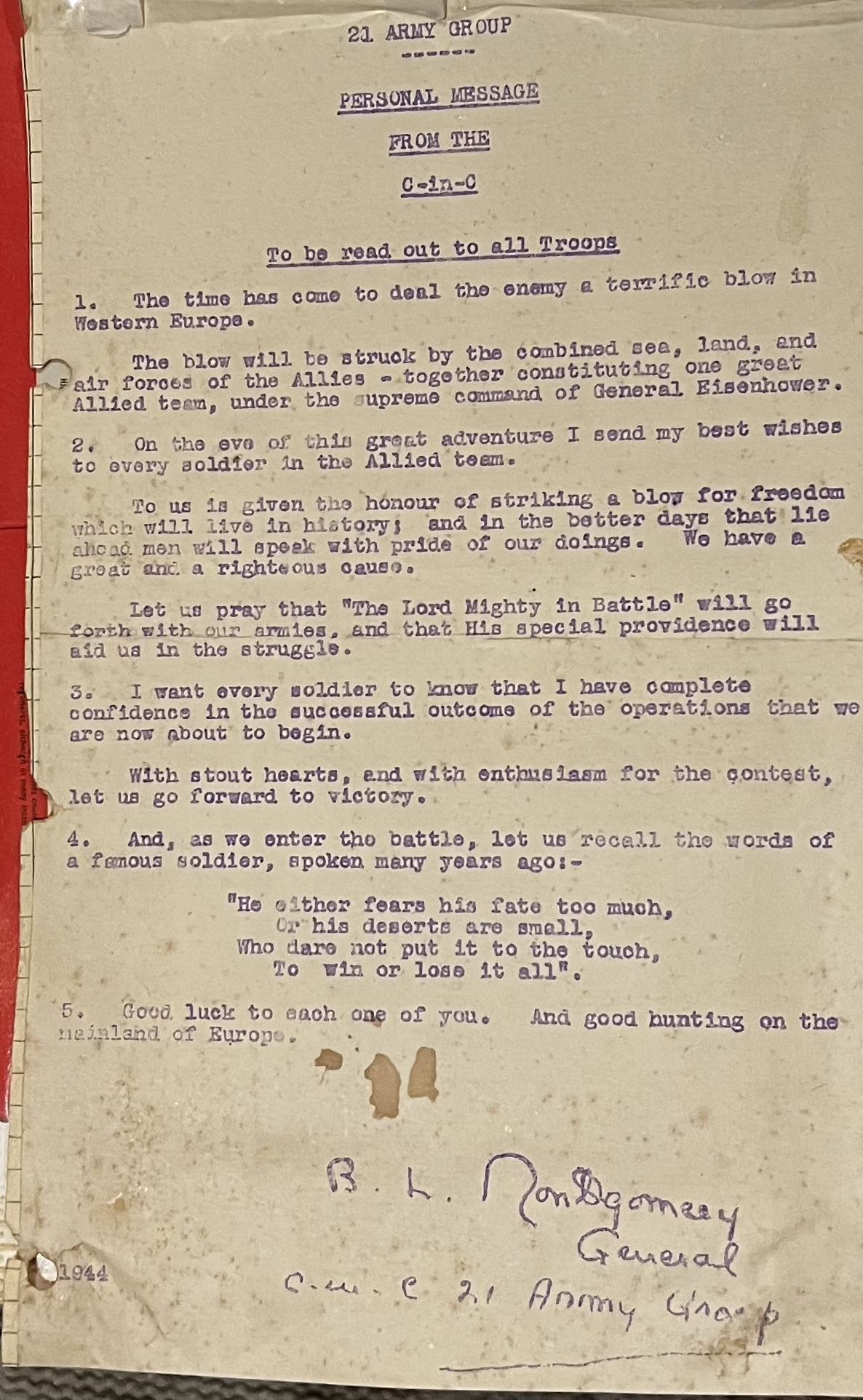
The time has come to deal the enemy a terrific blow ...

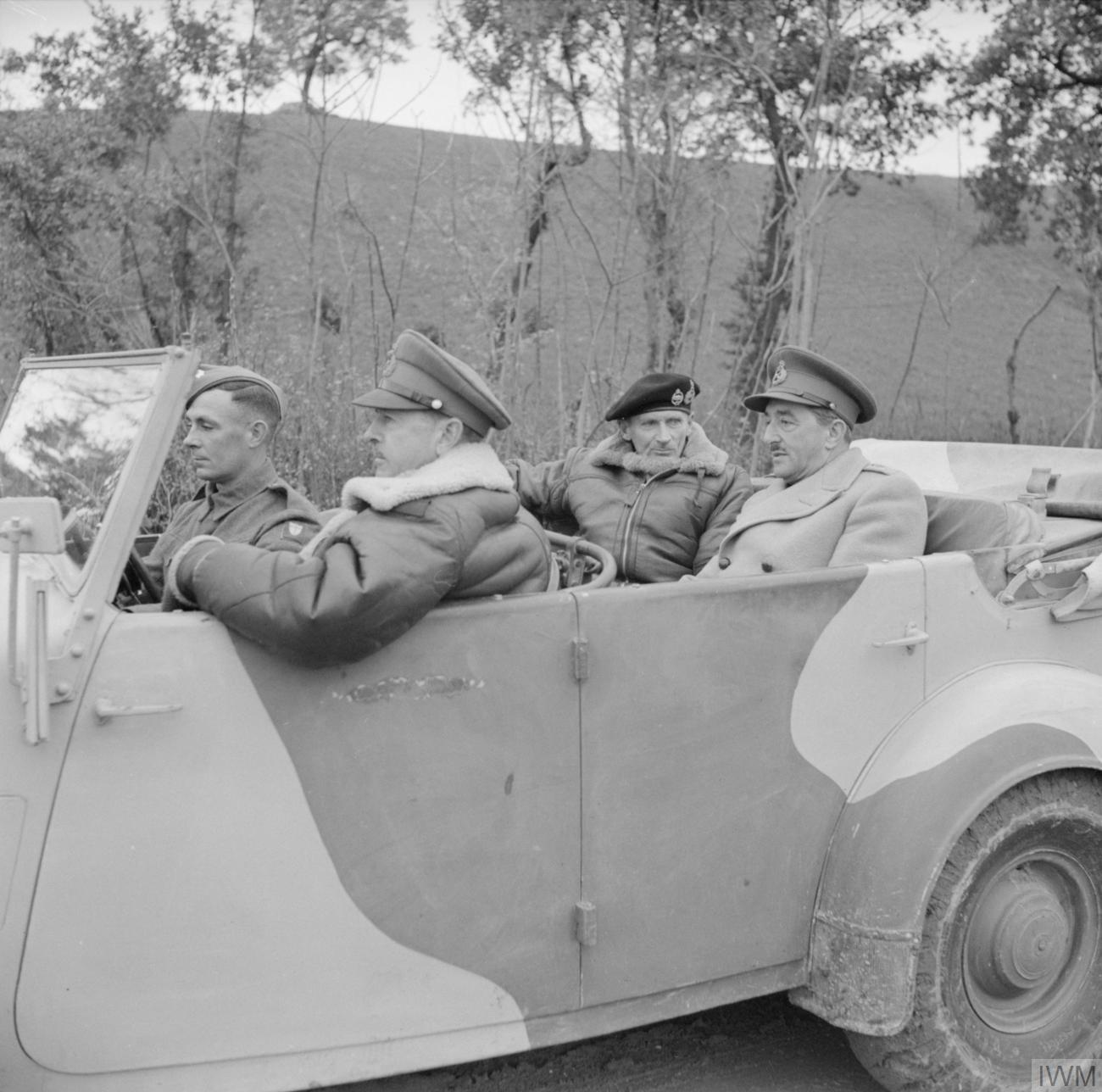
General Sir Bernard Montgomery in his staff car with General Sir Harold Alexander and General Sir Alan Brooke, during an inspection of the 8th Indian Infantry Division HQ, Italy, 15 December 1943

Clark's Fifth Army then began to advance to the west of the Apennine Mountains while Montgomery, with Lieutenant General Charles Allfrey's V Corps having arrived to reinforce Dempsey's XIII Corps, advanced to the east. The Foggia airfields soon fell to Allfrey's V Corps, but the Germans fought hard in the defence of Termoli and Biferno. Movement soon came to an almost complete halt in the early part of November when the Eighth Army came up against a new defensive line established by the Germans on the River Sangro, which was to be the scene of much bitter and heavy fighting for the next month. While some ground was gained, it was often at the expense of heavy casualties and the Germans always managed to retreat to new defensive positions.

Montgomery abhorred what he considered to be a lack of coordination, a dispersion of effort, a strategic muddle and a lack of opportunism in the Allied campaign in Italy, describing the whole affair as a "dog's breakfast".

=== Return to France ===
==== Normandy ====
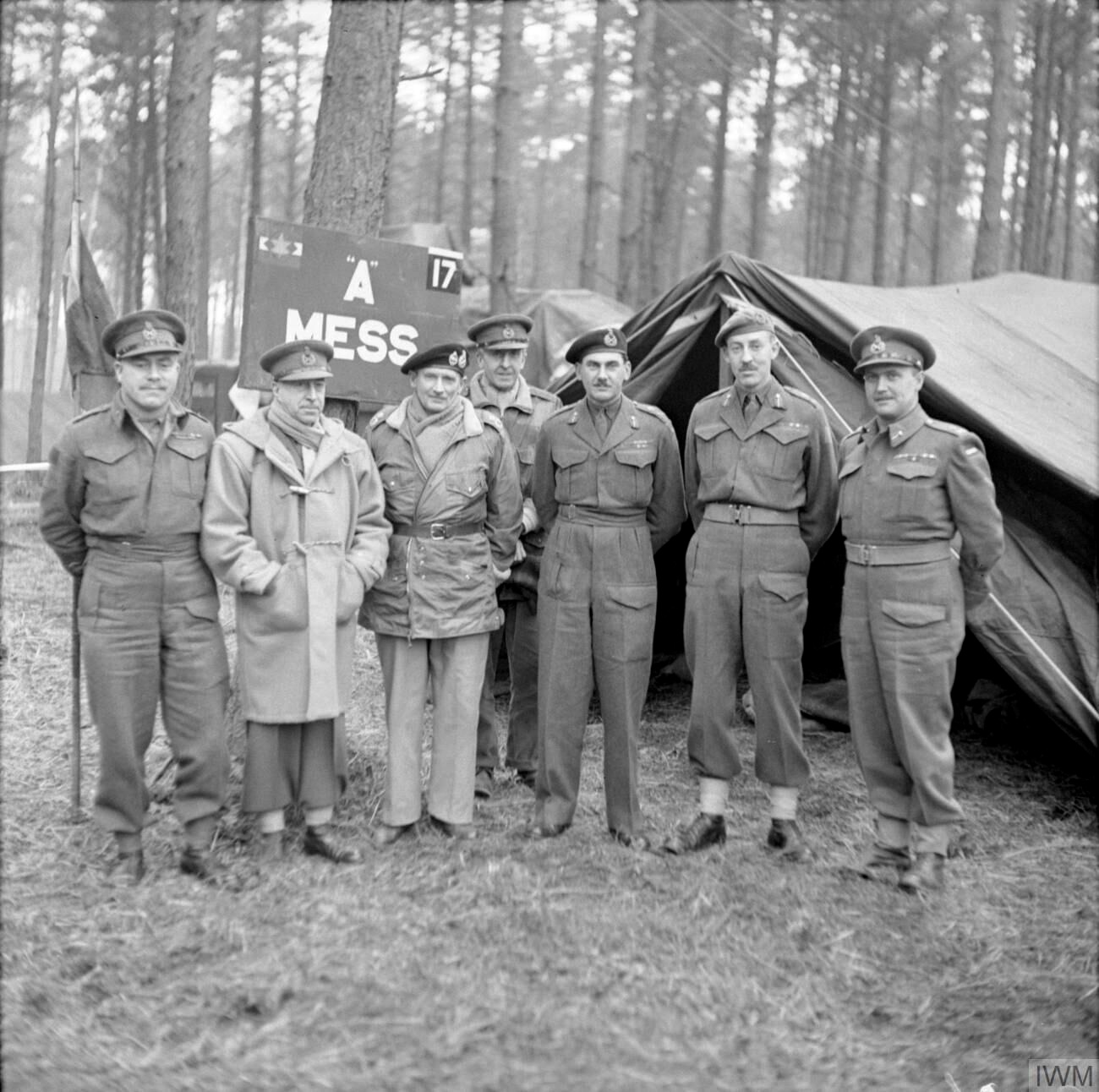
Montgomery with officers of the First Canadian Army. From left, Major-general Christopher Vokes, General Harry Crerar, Field Marshal Montgomery, Lieutenant-general Brian Horrocks, Lieutenant-general Guy Simonds, Major-general Daniel Spry, and Major-general Bruce Matthews

As a result of his dissatisfaction with Italy, he was delighted to receive the news that he was to return to Britain in January 1944. He was assigned to command the 21st Army Group consisting of all Allied ground forces participating in Operation Overlord, codename for the Allied invasion of Normandy. Overall direction was assigned to the Supreme Allied Commander of the Allied Expeditionary Forces, American General Dwight D. Eisenhower. Both Churchill and Eisenhower had found Montgomery difficult to work with in the past and wanted the position to go to the more affable General Sir Harold Alexander. However Montgomery's patron, General Sir Alan Brooke, firmly argued that Montgomery was a much superior general to Alexander and ensured his appointment. Without Brooke's support, Montgomery would have remained in Italy. At his headquarters St Paul's School on 7 April and 15 May Montgomery presented his strategy for the invasion. He envisaged a ninety-day battle, with all forces reaching the Seine. The campaign would pivot on an Allied-held Caen in the east of the Normandy bridgehead, with relatively static British and Canadian armies forming a shoulder to attract and defeat German counter-attacks, relieving the US armies who would move and seize the Cotentin Peninsula and Brittany, wheeling south and then east on the right forming a pincer.

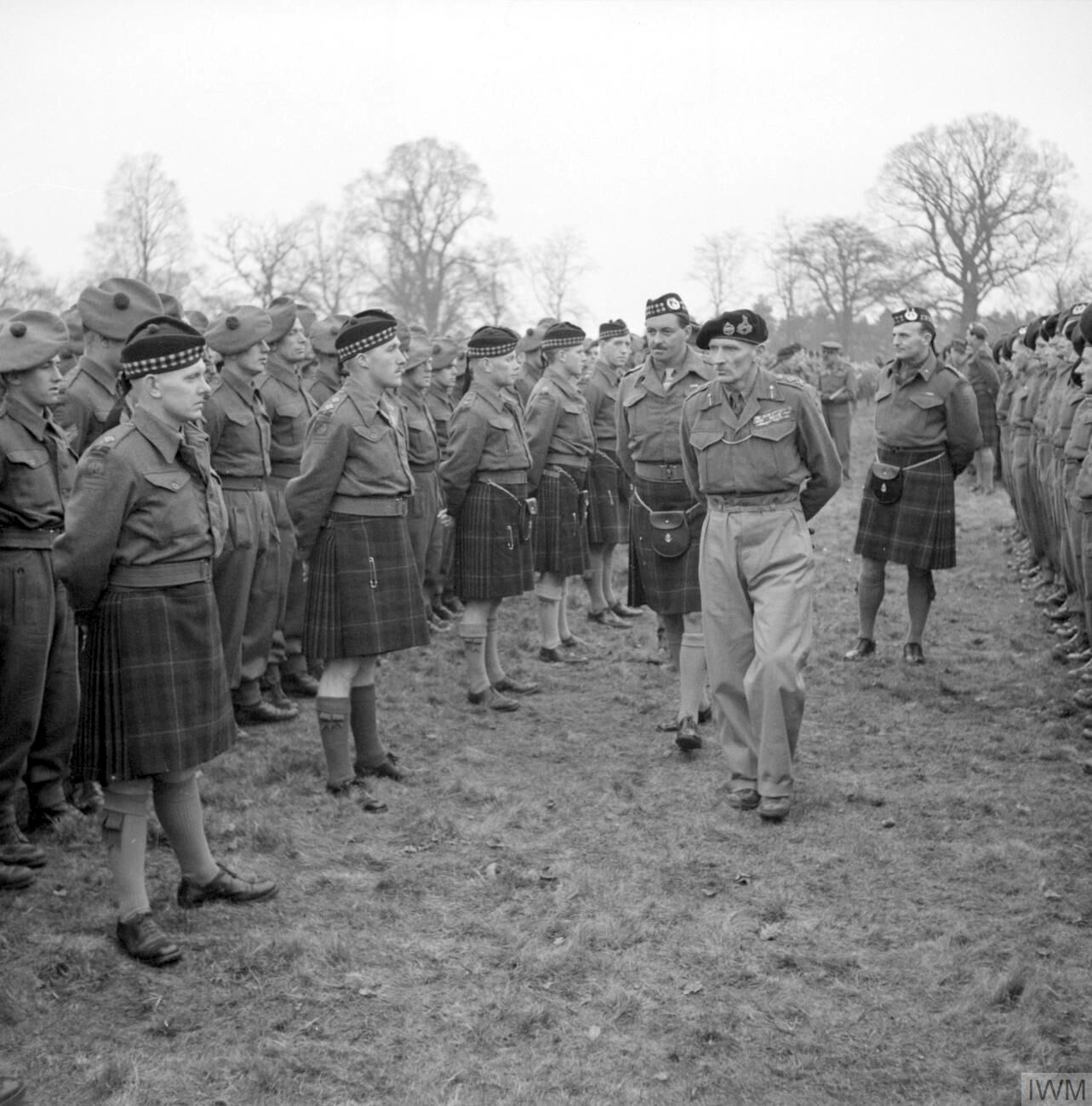
General Montgomery inspects men of the 5th/7th Battalion, Gordon Highlanders of the 51st (Highland) Division, at Beaconsfield, February 1944.

During the ten weeks of the Battle of Normandy, unfavourable autumnal weather conditions disrupted the Normandy landing areas. Montgomery's initial plan was for the Anglo-Canadian troops under his command to break out immediately from their beachheads on the Calvados coast towards Caen with the aim of taking the city on either D Day or two days later. Montgomery attempted to take Caen with the 3rd Infantry Division, the 50th (Northumbrian) Infantry Division and the 3rd Canadian Division, but was stopped from 6–8 June by the 21st Panzer Division and 12th SS Panzer Division Hitlerjugend, who hit the advancing Anglo-Canadian troops very hard. The 12th Waffen SS Division Hitlerjugend, as its name implies, was drawn entirely from the more fanatical elements of the Hitler Youth, and commanded by the ruthless SS-Brigadeführer Kurt Meyer, aka "Panzer Meyer". Rommel followed up this success by ordering the 2nd Panzer Division to Caen while Field Marshal Gerd von Rundstedt received permission from Hitler to have the elite 1st SS Panzer Division Leibstandarte SS Adolf Hitler and 2nd SS Panzer Division Das Reich sent to Caen as well. Montgomery thus had to face what Stephen Badsey called the "most formidable" of all the German divisions in France.

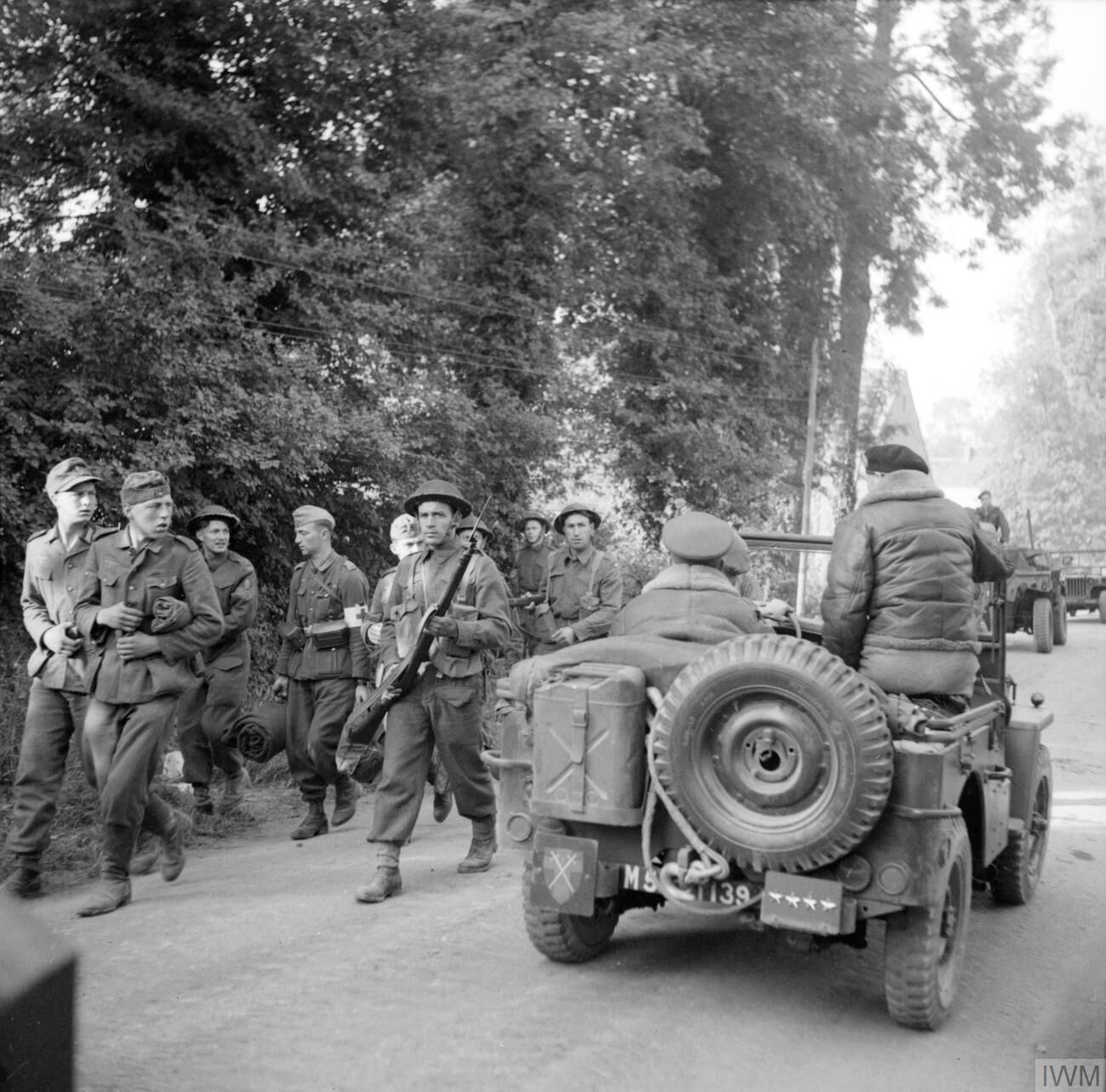
General Montgomery passes German POWs while being driven along a road in a jeep, shortly after arriving in Normandy, 8 June 1944. Two seem to have recognised him.

The failure to take Caen immediately has been the source of an immense historiographical dispute with bitter nationalist overtones. Broadly, there has been a "British school" which accepts Montgomery's post-war claim that he never intended to take Caen at once, and instead the Anglo-Canadian operations around Caen were a "holding operation" intended to attract the bulk of the German forces towards the Caen sector to allow the Americans to stage the "break out operation" on the left flank of the German positions, which was all part of Montgomery's "Master Plan" that he had conceived long before the Normandy campaign. By contrast, the "American school" argued that Montgomery's initial "master plan" was for the 21st Army Group to take Caen at once and move his tank divisions into the plains south of Caen, to then stage a breakout that would lead the 21st Army Group into the plains of northern France and hence into Antwerp and finally the Ruhr. Letters written by Eisenhower at the time of the battle make it clear that Eisenhower was expecting from Montgomery "the early capture of the important focal point of Caen". Later, when this plan had clearly failed, Eisenhower wrote that Montgomery had "evolved" the plan to have the US forces achieve the break-out instead.

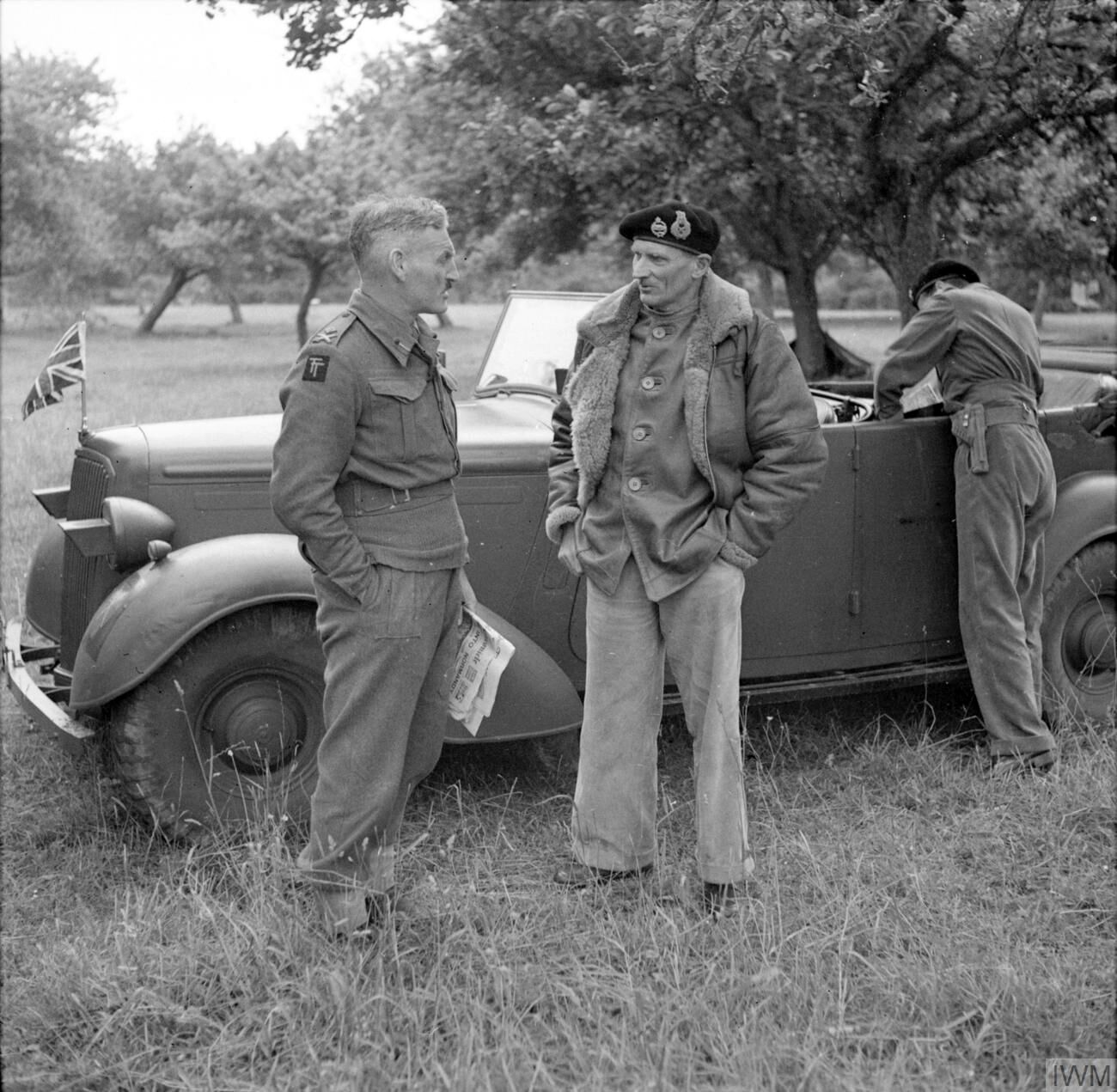
General Montgomery in conversation with Major-general Douglas Graham, GOC 50th (Northumbrian) Infantry Division, pictured here in Normandy, 20 June 1944

As the campaign progressed, Montgomery altered his initial plan for the invasion and continued the strategy of attracting and holding German counter-attacks in the area north of Caen rather than to the south, to allow the U.S. First Army in the west to take Cherbourg. A memo summarising Montgomery's operations written by Eisenhower's chief of staff, General Walter Bedell Smith, who met with Montgomery in late June 1944 says nothing about Montgomery conducting a "holding operation" in the Caen sector, and instead speaks of him seeking a "breakout" into the plains south of the Seine. On 12 June, Montgomery ordered the 7th Armoured Division into an attack against the Panzer Lehr Division that made good progress at first, but ended when the Panzer Lehr was joined by the 2nd Panzer Division. At the Battle of Villers-Bocage on 13 June, the British lost twenty Cromwell tanks to five Tiger tanks led by SS Obersturmführer Michael Wittmann, in about five minutes. Despite the setback at Villers Bocage, Montgomery was still optimistic as the Allies were landing more troops and supplies than they were losing in battle, and though the German lines were holding, the Wehrmacht and Waffen SS were suffering considerable attrition. Air Chief Marshal Sir Arthur Tedder complained that it was impossible to move fighter squadrons to France until Montgomery had captured some airfields, something he asserted that Montgomery appeared incapable of doing. The first V-1 flying bomb attacks on London, which started on 13 June, further increased the pressure on Montgomery from Whitehall to speed up his advance.

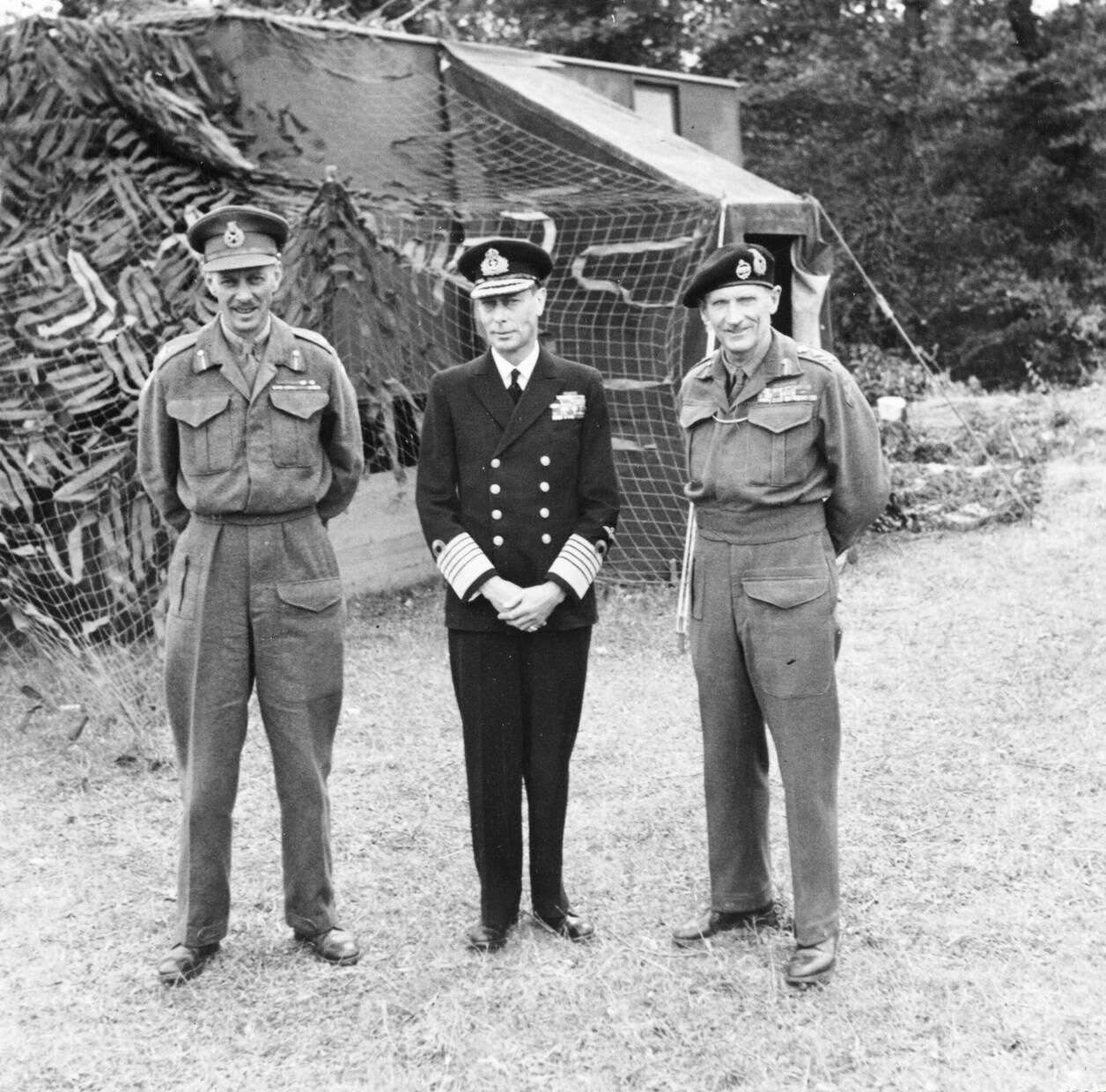
George VI with Lieutenant-general Miles Dempsey, GOC British Second Army, and General Montgomery, at his HQ in Creullet castle, 16 June 1944

On 18 June, Montgomery ordered Bradley to take Cherbourg while the British were to take Caen by 23 June. In Operation Epsom, the British VII Corps commanded by Sir Richard O'Connor attempted to outflank Caen from the west by breaking through the dividing line between the Panzer Lehr and the 12th SS to take the strategic Hill 112. Epsom began well with O'Connor's assault force (the British 15th Scottish Division) breaking through and with the 11th Armoured Division stopping the counter-attacks of the 12th SS Division. General Friedrich Dollmann of Seventh Army had to commit the newly arrived II SS Panzer Corps to stop the British offensive. Dollmann, fearing that Epsom would be a success, committed suicide and was replaced by SS Oberstegruppenführer Paul Hausser. O'Connor, at the cost of about 4,000 men, had won a salient only 5 miles (8.0 km) deep and 2 miles (3.2 km) wide, but placed the Germans in an unviable long-term position. There was a strong sense of crisis in the Allied command, as the Allies had advanced only about 15 miles (24 km) inland, at a time when their plans called for them to have already taken Rennes, Alençon and St. Malo. After Epsom, Montgomery had to tell General Harry Crerar that the activation of the First Canadian Army would have to wait as there was only room at present, in the Caen sector, for the newly arrived XII Corps under Lieutenant-general Neil Ritchie, which caused some tension with Crerar, who was anxious to get into the field. Epsom had forced further German forces into Caen but all through June and the first half of July Rommel, Rundstedt, and Hitler were engaged in planning for a great offensive to drive the British into the sea; it was never launched and would have required the commitment of a large number of German forces to the Caen sector.

It was only after several failed attempts to break out in the Caen sector that Montgomery devised what he later called his "master plan" of having the 21st Army Group hold the bulk of the German forces, thus allowing the Americans to break out. The Canadian historians Terry Copp and Robert Vogel wrote about the dispute between the "American school" and "British school" after having suffered several setbacks in June 1944:

Montgomery drew what was the indisputably correct conclusion from these events. If the British and Canadians could continue to hold the bulk of the German armoured divisions on their front through a series of limited attacks, they could wear down the Germans and create the conditions for an American breakout on the right. This is what Montgomery proposed in his Directive of June 30th and, if he and his admirers had let the record speak for itself, there would be little debate about his conduct of the first stages of the Normandy campaign. Instead, Montgomery insisted that this Directive was a consistent part of a master plan that he had devised long before the invasion. Curiously, this view does a great disservice to 'Monty' for any rigid planning of operations before the German response was known would have been bad generalship indeed!"

Hampered by stormy weather and the bocage terrain, Montgomery had to ensure that Rommel focused on the British in the east rather than the Americans in the west, who had to take the Cotentin Peninsula and Brittany before the Germans could be trapped by a general swing east. Montgomery told General Sir Miles Dempsey, the commander of Second British Army: "Go on hitting, drawing the German strength, especially some of the armour, onto yourself—so as to ease the way for Brad [Bradley]." The Germans had deployed twelve divisions, of which six were Panzer divisions, against the British while deploying eight divisions, of which three were Panzer divisions, against the Americans. By the middle of July Caen had not been taken, as Rommel continued to prioritise prevention of the break-out by British forces rather than the western territories being taken by the Americans. This was broadly as Montgomery had planned, albeit not with the same speed as he outlined at St Paul's, although as the American historian Carlo D'Este pointed out the actual situation in Normandy was "vastly different" from what was envisioned at the St. Paul's conference, as only one of four goals outlined in May had been achieved by 10 July.

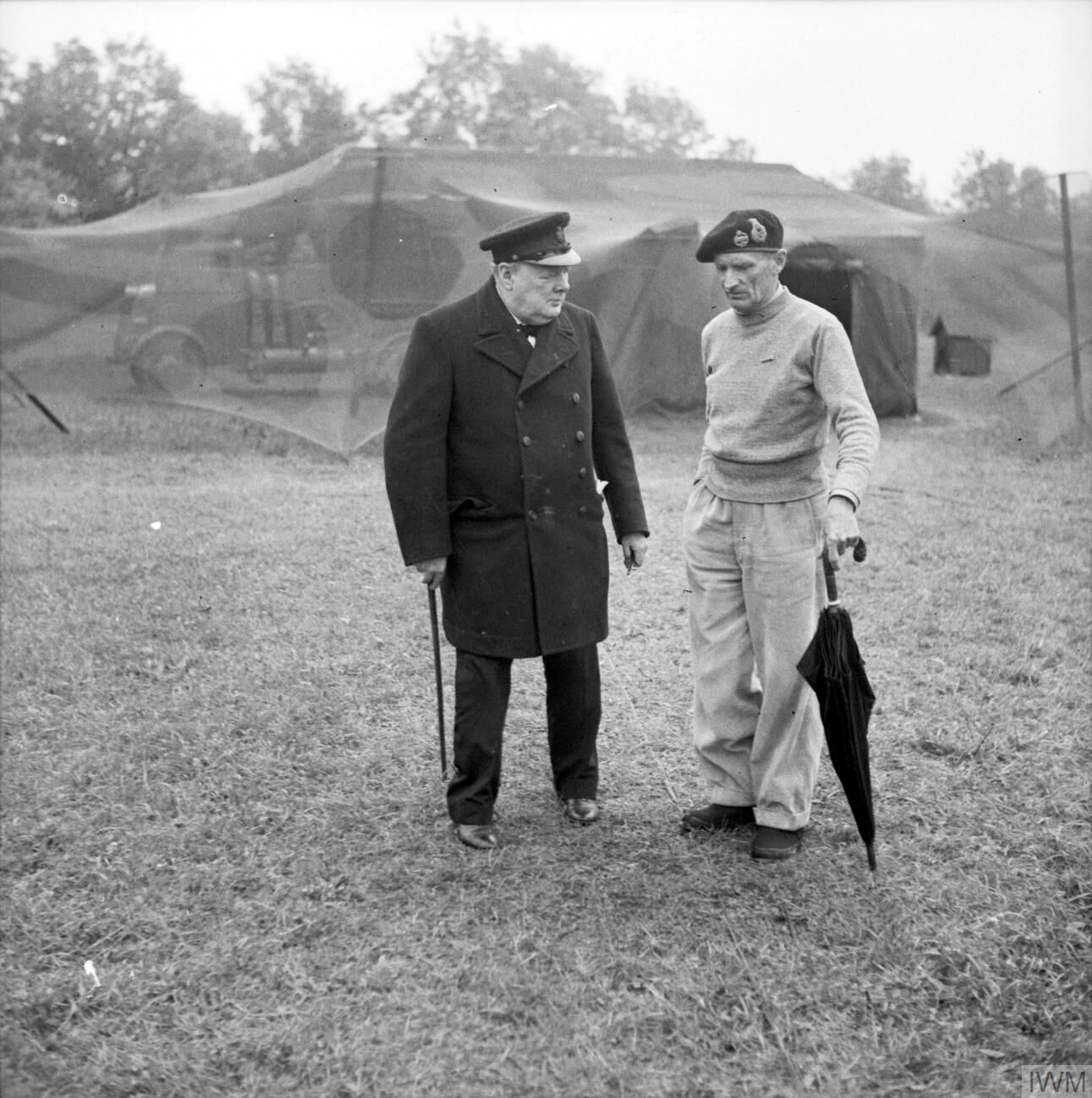
Prime Minister Churchill with General Montgomery at the latter's HQ in Normandy, July 1944

On 7 July, Montgomery began Operation Charnwood with a carpet bombing offensive that turned much of the French countryside and the city of Caen into a wasteland. The British and Canadians succeeded in advancing into northern Caen before the Germans, who used the ruins to their advantage and stopped the offensive. On 10 July, Montgomery ordered Bradley to take Avranches, after which U.S. Third Army would be activated to drive towards Le Mans and Alençon. On 14 July 1944, Montgomery wrote to his patron Brooke, saying he had chosen on a "real show down on the eastern flanks, and to loose a Corps of three armoured divisions in the open country about the Caen-Falaise road ... The possibilities are immense; with seven hundred tanks loosed to the South-east of Caen, and the armoured cars operating far ahead, anything can happen." The French Resistance had launched Plan Violet in June 1944 to systematically destroy the telephone system of France, which forced the Germans to use their radios more and more to communicate, and as the code-breakers of Bletchley Park had broken many of the German codes, Montgomery had, thanks to "Ultra" intelligence, a good idea of the German situation. Montgomery thus knew German Army Group B had lost 96,400 men while receiving 5,200 replacements and the Panzer Lehr Division now based at Saint-Lô was down to only 40 tanks. Montgomery later wrote that he knew he had the Normandy campaign won at this point as the Germans had almost no reserves while he had three armoured divisions in reserve.

An American break-out was achieved with Operation Cobra and the encirclement of German forces in the Falaise pocket at the cost of British losses with the diversionary Operation Goodwood. On the early morning of 18 July 1944, Operation Goodwood began with British heavy bombers beginning carpet bombing attacks that further devastated what was left of Caen and the surrounding countryside. A British tank crewman from the Guards Armoured Division later recalled: "At 0500 hours a distant thunder in the air brought all the sleepy-eyed tank crews out of their blankets. 1,000 Lancasters were flying from the sea in groups of three or four at 3,000 feet (910 m). Ahead of them the pathfinders were scattering their flares and before long the first bombs were dropping." A German tankman from the 21st Panzer Division at the receiving end of this bombardment remembered: "We saw little dots detach themselves from the planes, so many of them that the crazy thought occurred to us: are those leaflets? ... Among the thunder of the explosions, we could hear the wounded scream and the insane howling of men who had [been] driven mad." The British bombing had badly smashed the German front-line units. Initially, the three British armoured divisions assigned to lead the offensive, the 7th, 11th and the Guards, made rapid progress and were soon approaching the Borguebus ridge, which dominated the landscape south of Caen, by noon.

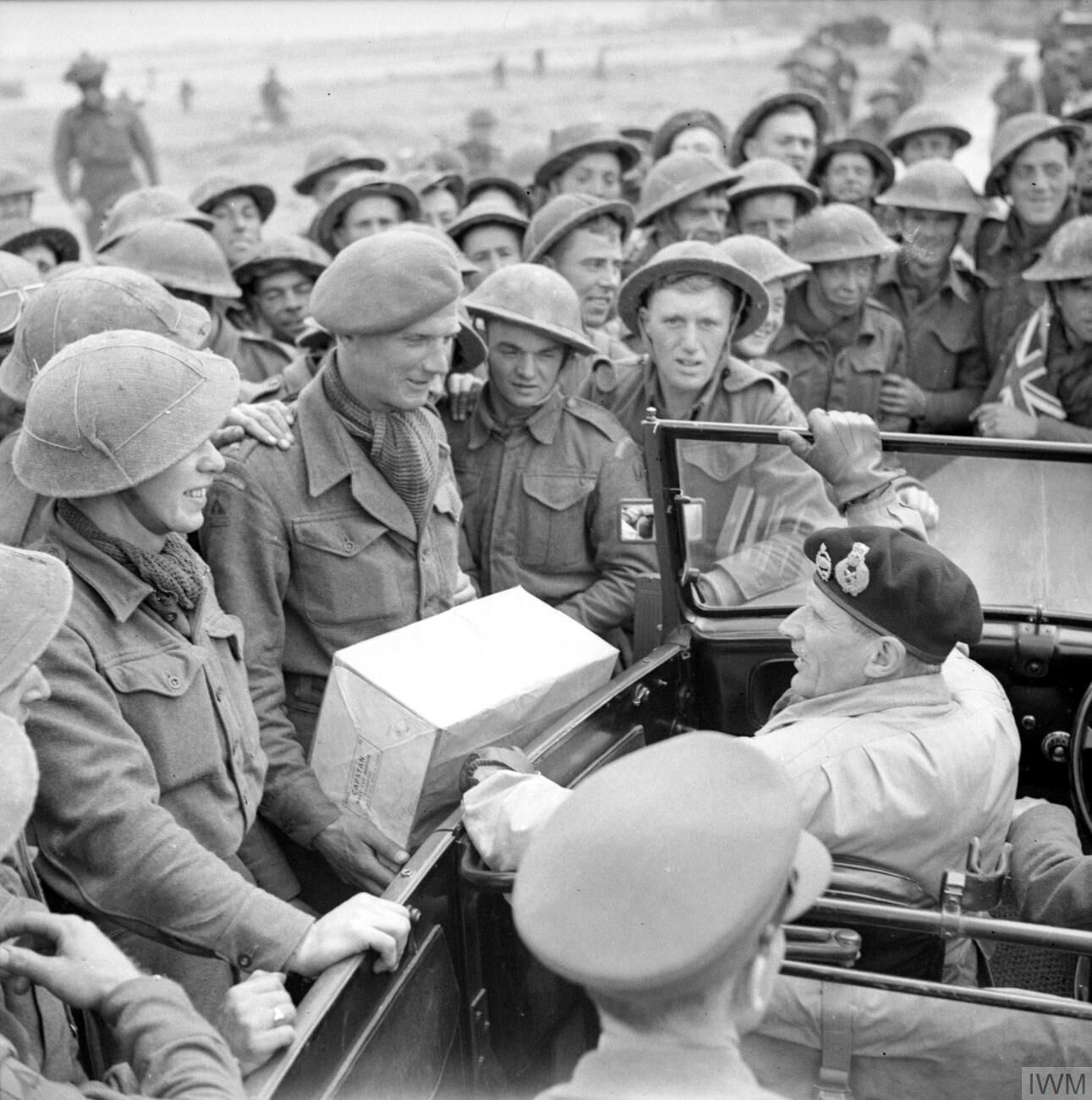
General Montgomery stops his car to chat with troops during a tour of I Corps area near Caen, 11 July 1944.

If the British could take the Borguebus Ridge, the way to the plains of northern France would be wide open, and potentially Paris could be taken, which explains the ferocity with which the Germans defended the ridge. One German officer, Lieutenant Baron von Rosen, recalled that to motivate a Luftwaffe officer commanding a battery of four 88 mm guns to fight against the British tanks, he had to hold his handgun to the officer's head "and asked him whether he would like to be killed immediately or get a high decoration. He decided for the latter." The well dug-in 88 mm guns around the Borguebus Ridge began taking a toll on the British Sherman tanks, and the countryside was soon dotted with dozens of burning Shermans. One British officer reported with worry: "I see palls of smoke and tanks brewing up with flames belching forth from their turrets. I see men climbing out, on fire like torches, rolling on the ground to try and douse the flames." Despite Montgomery's orders to try to press on, fierce German counter-attacks stopped the British offensive.

The objectives of Operation Goodwood were all achieved except the complete capture of the Bourgebus Ridge, which was only partially taken. The operation was a strategic Allied success in drawing in the last German reserves in Normandy towards the Caen sector away from the American sector, greatly assisting the American breakout in Operation Cobra. By the end of Goodwood on 25 July 1944, the Canadians had finally taken Caen while the British tanks had reached the plains south of Caen, giving Montgomery the "hinge" he had been seeking, while forcing the Germans to commit the last of their reserves to stop the Anglo-Canadian offensive. "Ultra" decrypts indicated that the Germans now facing Bradley were seriously understrength, with Operation Cobra about to commence. During Operation Goodwood, the British had 400 tanks knocked out, with many recovered returning to service. The casualties were 5,500 with 7 miles (11 km) of ground gained. Bradley recognised Montgomery's plan to pin down German armour and allow U.S. forces to break out:

The British and Canadian armies were to decoy the enemy reserves and draw them to their front on the extreme eastern edge of the Allied beachhead. Thus, while Monty taunted the enemy at Caen, we [the Americans] were to make our break on the long roundabout road to Paris. When reckoned in terms of national pride, this British decoy mission became a sacrificial one, for while we tramped around the outside flank, the British were to sit in place and pin down the Germans. Yet strategically it fitted into a logical division of labors, for it was towards Caen that the enemy reserves would race once the alarm was sounded.

The long-running dispute over what Montgomery's "master plan" in Normandy led historians to differ greatly about the purpose of Goodwood. The British journalist Mark Urban wrote that the purpose of Goodwood was to draw German troops to their left flank to allow the American forces to break out on the right flank, arguing that Montgomery had to lie to his soldiers about the purpose of Goodwood, as the average British soldier would not have understood why they were being asked to create a diversion to allow the Americans to have the glory of staging the breakout with Operation Cobra. By contrast, the American historian Stephen Power argued that Goodwood was intended to be the "breakout" offensive and not a "holding operation", writing: "It is unrealistic to assert that an operation which called for the use of 4,500 Allied aircraft, 700 artillery pieces and over 8,000 armored vehicles and trucks and that cost the British over 5,500 casualties was conceived and executed for so limited an objective." Power noted that Goodwood and Cobra were supposed to take effect on the same day, 18 July 1944, but Cobra was cancelled owing to heavy rain in the American sector, and argued that both operations were meant to be breakout operations to trap the German armies in Normandy. American military writer Drew Middleton wrote that there is no doubt that Montgomery wanted Goodwood to provide a "shield" for Bradley, but at the same time Montgomery was clearly hoping for more than merely diverting German attention away from the American sector. British historian John Keegan pointed out that Montgomery made differing statements before Goodwood about the purpose of the operation. Keegan wrote that Montgomery engaged in what he called a "hedging of his bets" when drafting his plans for Goodwood, with a plan for a "break out if the front collapsed, if not, sound documentary evidence that all he had intended in the first place was a battle of attrition". Again Bradley confirmed Montgomery's plan and that the capture of Caen was only incidental to his mission, not critical. The American magazine LIFE quoted Bradley in 1951:

While Collins was hoisting his VII Corps flag over Cherbourg, Montgomery was spending his reputation in a bitter siege against the old university city of Caen. For three weeks he had rammed his troops against those panzer divisions he had deliberately drawn towards that city as part of our Allied strategy of diversion in the Normandy Campaign. Although Caen contained an important road junction that Montgomery would eventually need, for the moment the capture of that city was only incidental to his mission. For Monty's primary task was to attract German troops to the British front that we might more easily secure Cherbourg and get into position for the breakout. While this diversion of Montgomery's was brilliantly achieved, he nevertheless left himself open to criticism by overemphasising the importance of his thrust toward Caen. Had he limited himself simply to the containment without making Caen a symbol of it, he would have been credited with success instead of being charged, as he was, with failure.

With Goodwood drawing the Wehrmacht towards the British sector, U.S. First Army enjoyed a two-to-one numerical superiority. Bradley accepted Montgomery's advice to begin the offensive by concentrating at one point instead of a "broad front" as Eisenhower would have preferred.

Operation Goodwood almost cost Montgomery his job, as Eisenhower seriously considered sacking him and only chose not to do so because to sack the popular "Monty" would have caused such a political backlash in Britain against the Americans at a critical moment in the war that the resulting strains in the Atlantic alliance were not considered worth it. Montgomery expressed his satisfaction at the results of Goodwood when calling the operation off. Eisenhower was under the impression that Goodwood was to be a break-out operation. Either there was a miscommunication between the two men or Eisenhower did not understand the strategy. Bradley fully understood Montgomery's intentions. Both men would not give away to the press the true intentions of their strategy.

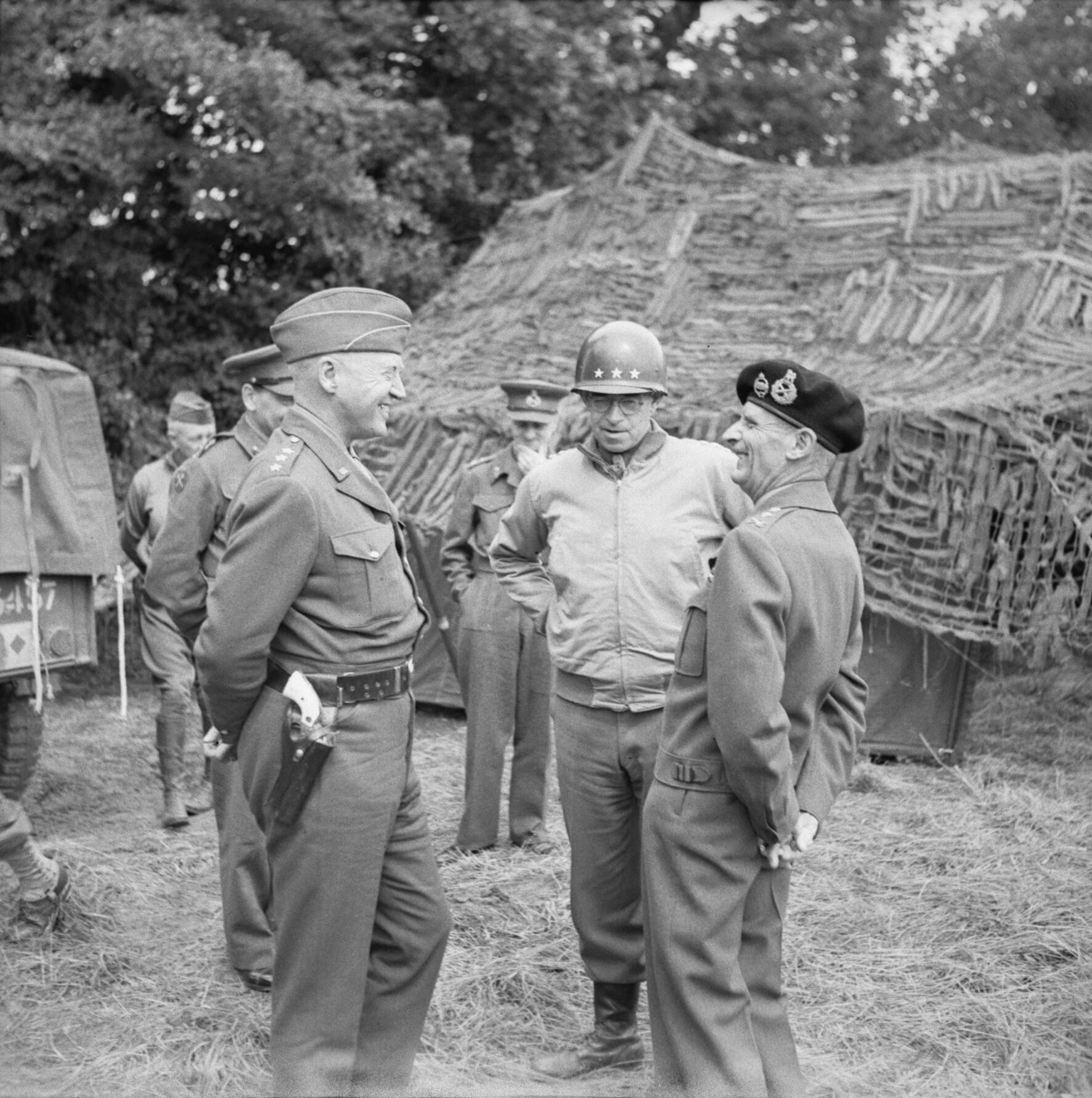
General Montgomery joking with Lieutenant Generals George S. Patton (left) and Omar Bradley (centre) at 21st Army Group HQ, 7 July 1944

Many American officers had found Montgomery a difficult man to work with, and after Goodwood, pressured Eisenhower to fire Montgomery. Although the Eisenhower–Montgomery dispute is sometimes depicted in nationalist terms as being an Anglo-American struggle, it was the British Air Chief Marshal Sir Arthur Tedder who was pressing Eisenhower most strongly after Goodwood to fire Montgomery. An American officer wrote in his diary that Tedder had come to see Eisenhower to "pursue his current favourite subject, the sacking of Monty". With Tedder leading the "sack Monty" campaign, it encouraged Montgomery's American enemies to press Eisenhower to fire Montgomery. Brooke was sufficiently worried about the "sack Monty" campaign to visit Montgomery at his Tactical Headquarters (TAC) in France and as he wrote in his diary; "warned [Montgomery] of a tendency in the PM [Churchill] to listen to suggestions that Monty played for safety and was not prepared to take risks". Brooke advised Montgomery to invite Churchill to Normandy, arguing that if the "sack Monty" campaign had won the Prime Minister over, then his career would be over, as having Churchill's backing would give Eisenhower the political "cover" to fire Montgomery. On 20 July, Montgomery met Eisenhower and on 21 July, Churchill, at the TAC in France. One of Montgomery's staff officers wrote afterwards that it was "common knowledge at Tac that Churchill had come to sack Monty". No notes were taken at the Eisenhower–Montgomery and Churchill–Montgomery meetings, but Montgomery was able to persuade both men not to sack him.

With the success of Cobra, which was soon followed by unleashing Patton's Third Army, Eisenhower wrote to Montgomery: "Am delighted that your basic plan has begun brilliantly to unfold with Bradley's initial success." The success of Cobra was aided by Operation Spring, when the II Canadian Corps under General Guy Simonds (the only Canadian general whose skill Montgomery respected) began an offensive south of Caen that made little headway, but which the Germans regarded as the main offensive. Once Third Army arrived, Bradley was promoted to take command of the newly created 12th Army Group, consisting of U.S. First and Third Armies. Following the American breakout, there followed the Battle of Falaise Gap. British, Canadian, and Polish soldiers of 21st Army Group commanded by Montgomery advanced south, while the American and French soldiers of Bradley's 12th Army Group advanced north to encircle the German Army Group B at Falaise, as Montgomery waged what Urban called "a huge battle of annihilation" in August 1944. Montgomery began his offensive into the Suisse Normande region with Operation Bluecoat, with Sir Richard O'Connor's VIII Corps and Gerard Bucknall's XXX Corps heading south. A dissatisfied Montgomery sacked Bucknall for being insufficiently aggressive and replaced him with General Brian Horrocks. At the same time, Montgomery ordered Patton — whose Third Army was allocated in the Overlord plan to advance into Brittany and secure American logistics in Operation Chastity — to instead capture Nantes, which was soon taken.

Bernard Montgomery in a caricature by Marian Walentynowicz, 1944

Hitler waited too long to order his soldiers to retreat from Normandy, leading Montgomery to write: "He [Hitler] refused to face the only sound military course. As a result the Allies caused the enemy staggering losses in men and materials." Knowing via "Ultra" that Hitler was not planning to retreat from Normandy, Montgomery, on 6 August 1944, ordered an envelopment operation against Army Group B—with the First Canadian Army under Harry Crerar to advance towards Falaise, British Second Army under Miles Dempsey to advance towards Argentan, and Patton's Third Army to advance to Alençon. On 11 August, Montgomery changed his plan, with the Canadians to take Falaise and to meet the Americans at Argentan. The First Canadian Army launched two operations, Operation Totalize on 7 August, which advanced only 9 miles (14 km) in four days in the face of fierce German resistance, and Operation Tractable on 14 August, which finally took Falaise on 17 August. In view of the slow Canadian advance, Patton requested permission to take Falaise, but was refused by Bradley on 13 August. This prompted much controversy, many historians arguing that Bradley lacked aggression and that Montgomery should have overruled Bradley.

The so-called Falaise Gap was closed on 22 August 1944, but several American generals, most notably Patton, accused Montgomery of being insufficiently aggressive in closing it. About 60,000 German soldiers were trapped in Normandy, but before 22 August, about 20,000 Germans had escaped through the Falaise Gap. About 10,000 Germans had been killed in the Battle of the Falaise Gap, which led a stunned Eisenhower, who viewed the battlefield on 24 August, to comment with horror that it was impossible to walk without stepping on corpses. The successful conclusion of the Normandy campaign saw the beginning of the debate between the "American school" and "British school" as both American and British generals started to advance claims about who was most responsible for this victory. Brooke wrote in defence of his protégé Montgomery: "Ike knows nothing about strategy and is 'quite' unsuited to the post of Supreme Commander. It is no wonder that Monty's real high ability is not always realised. Especially so when 'national' spectacles pervert the perspective of the strategic landscape." About Montgomery's conduct of the Normandy campaign, Badsey wrote:

Too much discussion on Normandy has centered on the controversial decisions of the Allied commanders. It was not good enough, apparently, to win such a complete and spectacular victory over an enemy that had conquered most of Europe unless it was done perfectly. Most of the blame for this lies with Montgomery, who was foolish enough to insist that it had been done perfectly, that Normandy—and all his other battles—had been fought accordingly to a precise master plan drawn up beforehand, from which he never deviated. It says much for his personality that Montgomery found others to agree with him, despite overwhelming evidence to the contrary. His handling of the Battle of Normandy was of a very high order, and as the person who would certainly have been blamed for losing the battle, he deserves the credit for winning it.

==== Replaced as Ground Forces Commander ====
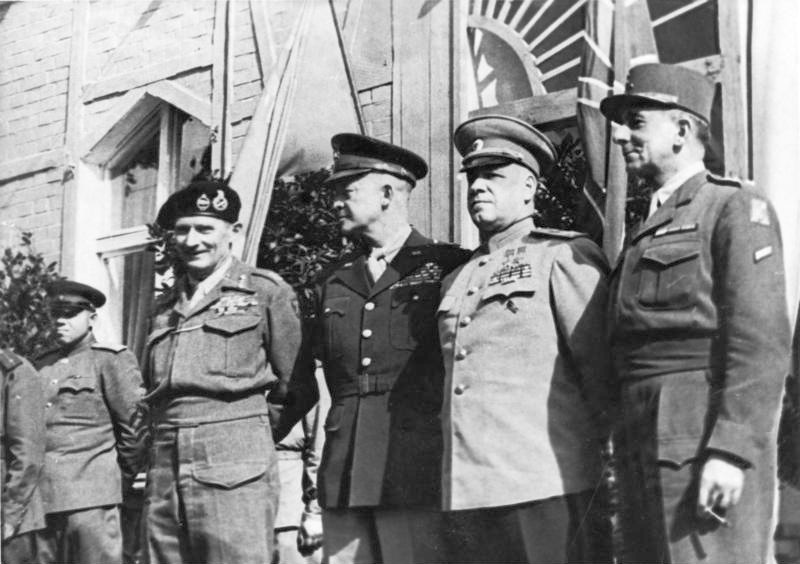
The Supreme Commanders on 5 June 1945 in Berlin: Bernard Montgomery, Dwight D. Eisenhower, Georgy Zhukov and Jean de Lattre de Tassigny

Eisenhower took over Ground Forces Command on 1 September, while continuing as Supreme Commander, with Montgomery continuing to command the 21st Army Group, now consisting mainly of British and Canadian units. Montgomery vehemently opposed this change, although it had been agreed before the D-Day invasion, instead proposing that either he or Bradley should remain in the job of Ground Forces command. He argued that the two roles were fundamentally different and that Eisenhower possessed the skillset for the former but not the latter; as such, he was liable to neglect the duties of one or the other, rendering the force off-balance. Instead, there was a need for a single decisive master plan under a leader free from the more administrative and political duties of the Supreme Commander - Montgomery felt he was the best equipped to deliver this, but was clear that he would also have been willing to work under Bradley.

Eisenhower and many others failed to grasp this however, and would misinterpret this as Montgomery's pride being wounded at having command removed. As such, they would attempt to placate him by reassuring him of the areas remaining under his command, and Winston Churchill had Montgomery promoted to field marshal by way of compensation. In addition, the British journalist Mark Urban points out that Montgomery seemed unable to grasp however that as the majority of the 2.2 million Allied soldiers fighting against Germany on the Western Front were now American (the ratio was 3:1) that it was politically unacceptable to American public opinion to have Montgomery remain as Land Forces Commander as: "Politics would not allow him to carry on giving orders to great armies of Americans simply because, in his view, [he was the best man for the job]".

==== Advance to the Rhine ====
By September, ports like Cherbourg were too far away from the front line, causing the Allies great logistical problems. Antwerp was the third largest port in Europe. It was a deep water inland port connected to the North Sea via the river Scheldt. The Scheldt was wide enough and dredged deep enough to allow the passage of ocean-going ships.

On 3 September 1944 Hitler ordered Fifteenth Army, which had been stationed in the Pas de Calais region and was withdrawing north into the Low Countries, to hold the mouth of the river Scheldt to deprive the Allies of the use of Antwerp. Von Rundstedt, the German commander of the Western Front, ordered General Gustav-Adolf von Zangen, the commander of 15th Army, that: "The attempt of the enemy to occupy the West Scheldt in order to obtain the free use of the harbor of Antwerp must be resisted to the utmost" (emphasis in the original). Rundstedt argued with Hitler that as long as the Allies could not use the port of Antwerp, the Allies would lack the logistical capacity for an invasion of Germany.

The Witte Brigade (White Brigade) of the Belgian resistance had captured the Port of Antwerp before the Germans could destroy key port facilities, and on 4 September, Antwerp was captured by Horrocks with its harbour mostly intact. The British declined to immediately advance over the Albert Canal, and an opportunity to destroy the German Fifteenth Army was lost. The Germans had mined the river Scheldt, the mouth of the Scheldt was still in German hands making it impossible for the Royal Navy to clear the mines in the river, and therefore the port of Antwerp was still useless to the Allies.

On 5 September, SHAEF's naval commander, Admiral Sir Bertram Ramsay, had urged Montgomery to make clearing the mouth of the Scheldt his number-one priority. Alone among the senior commanders, only Ramsay saw opening Antwerp as crucial. Thanks to "Ultra," Montgomery was aware of Hitler's order by 5 September.

On 9 September, Montgomery wrote to Brooke that "one good Pas de Calais port" would be sufficient to meet all the logistical needs of the 21st Army Group, but only the supply needs of the same formation. At the same time, Montgomery noted that "one good Pas de Calais port" would be insufficient for the American armies in France, which would thus force Eisenhower, if for no other reasons than logistics, to favour Montgomery's plans for an invasion of northern Germany by the 21st Army Group, whereas if Antwerp were opened up, then all of the Allied armies could be supplied.

The importance of ports closer to Germany was highlighted with the liberation of the city of Le Havre, which was assigned to John Crocker's I Corps. To take Le Havre, two infantry divisions, two tank brigades, most of the artillery of the British Second Army, the specialised armoured "gadgets" of Percy Hobart's 79th Armoured Division, the battleship HMS Warspite and the monitor HMS Erebus were all committed. On 10 September 1944, RAF Bomber Command dropped 4,719 tons of bombs on Le Havre, which was the prelude to Operation Astonia, the assault on Le Havre by Crocker's men, which was taken two days later. The Canadian historian Terry Copp wrote that the commitment of this much firepower and men to take only one French city might "seem excessive", but by this point, the Allies desperately needed ports closer to the front line to sustain their advance.

In September 1944, Montgomery ordered Crerar and his First Canadian Army to take the French ports on the English Channel, namely Calais, Boulogne and Dunkirk, and to clear the Scheldt, a task that Crerar stated was impossible as he lacked enough troops to perform both operations at once. Montgomery refused Crerar's request to have British XII Corps under Neil Ritchie assigned to help clear the Scheldt as Montgomery stated he needed XII Corps for Operation Market Garden. On 6 September 1944, Montgomery told Crerar that "I want Boulogne badly" and that city should be taken no matter what the cost. On 22 September 1944, Simonds's II Canadian Corps took Boulogne, followed up by taking Calais on 1 October 1944. Montgomery was highly impatient with Simonds, complaining that it had taken Crocker's I Corps only two days to take Le Havre while it took Simonds two weeks to take Boulogne and Calais, but Simonds noted that at Le Havre, three divisions and two brigades had been employed, whereas at both Boulogne and Calais, only two brigades were sent in to take both cities. After an attempt to storm the Leopold Canal by the 4th Canadian Division had been badly smashed by the German defenders, Simonds ordered a stop to further attempts to clear the river Scheldt until his mission of capturing the French ports on the English Channel had been accomplished; this allowed the German Fifteenth Army ample time to dig into its new home on the Scheldt. The only port that was not captured by the Canadians was Dunkirk, as Montgomery ordered the 2nd Canadian Division on 15 September to hold his flank at Antwerp as a prelude for an advance up the Scheldt.

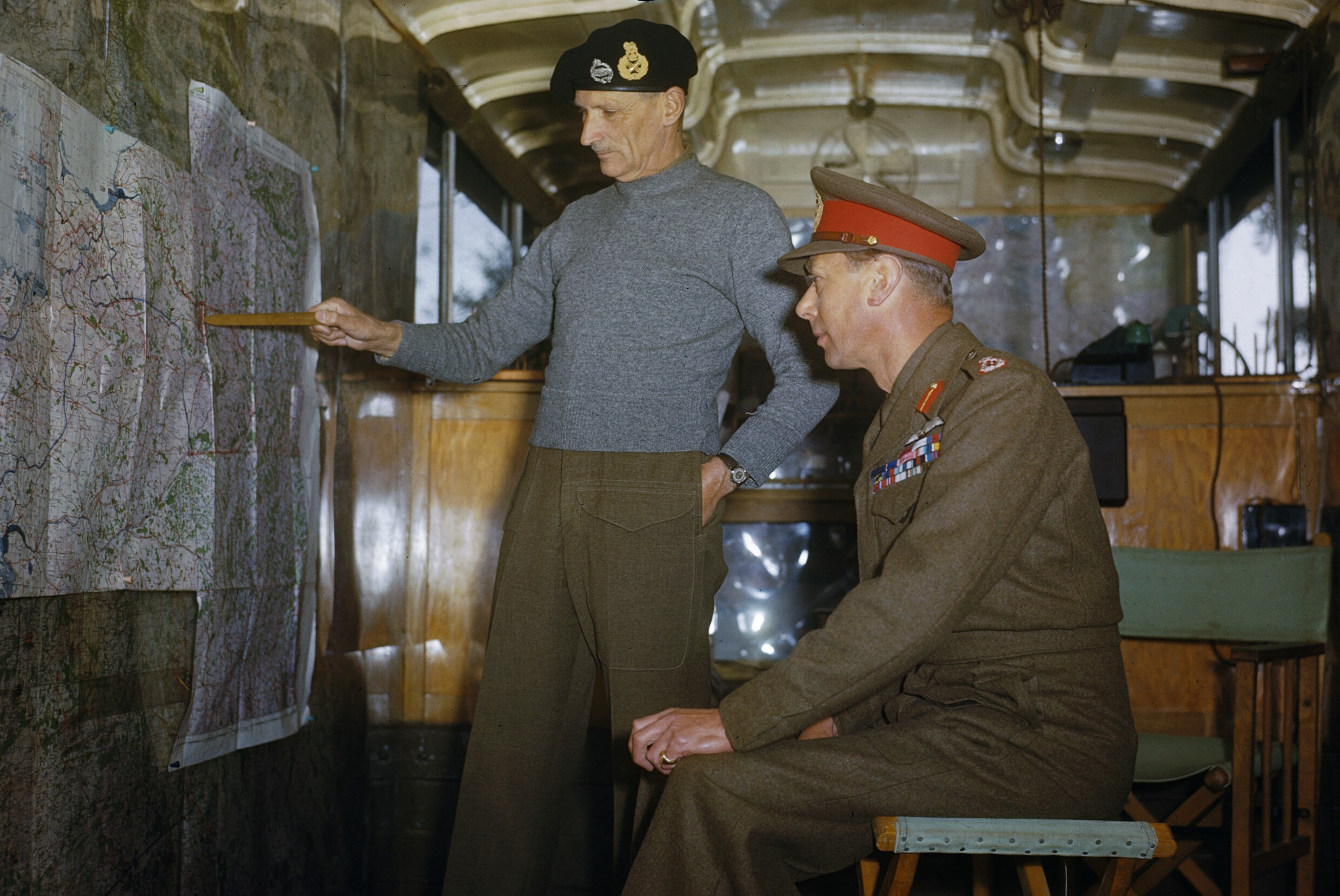
Holland, 13 October 1944: Montgomery outlines his future strategy to King George VI in his mobile headquarters.

Montgomery pulled away from the First Canadian Army (temporarily commanded now by Simonds as Crerar was ill), the British 51st Highland Division, 1st Polish Division, British 49th (West Riding) Infantry Division and 2nd Canadian Armoured Brigade, and sent all of these formations to help the Second British Army to expand the Market Garden salient with Operations Constellation, Aintree, and towards the end of October Pheasant. However, Simonds seems to have regarded the Scheldt campaign as a test of his ability, and he felt he could clear the Scheldt with only three Canadian divisions, despite having to take on the entire Fifteenth Army, which held strongly fortified positions in a landscape that favoured the defence. Simonds never complained about the lack of air support (made worse by the cloudy October weather), shortages of ammunition or having insufficient troops, regarding these problems as challenges for him to overcome, rather than a cause for complaint. As it was, Simonds made only slow progress in October 1944 during the fighting in the Battle of the Scheldt, although he was praised by Copp for imaginative and aggressive leadership who managed to achieve much, despite all of the odds against him. Montgomery had little respect for the Canadian generals, whom he dismissed as mediocre, with the exception of Simonds, whom he consistently praised as Canada's only "first-rate" general in the entire war.

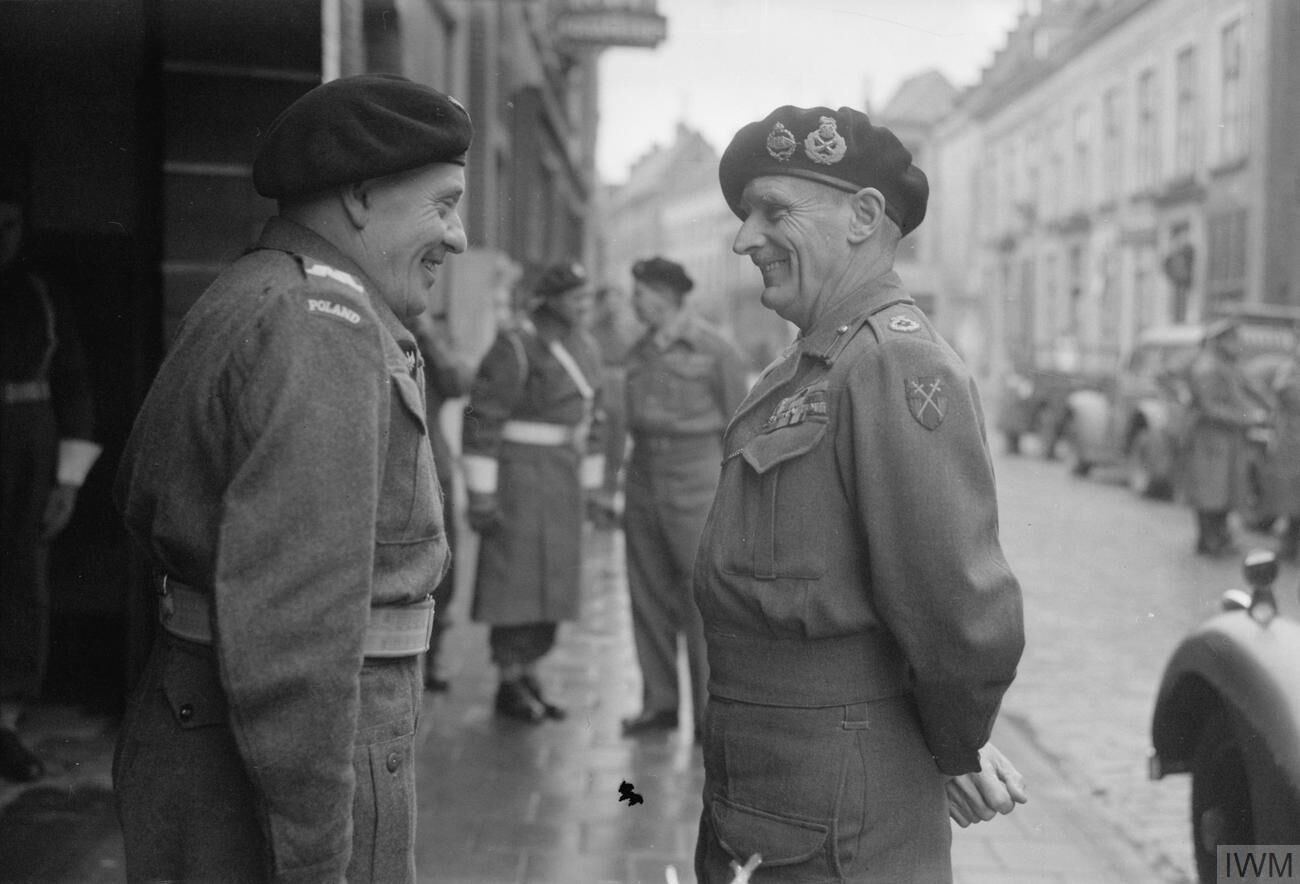
Montgomery in conversation with Major General Stanisław Maczek during his visit to the 1st Polish Armoured Division Headquarters in Breda, 25 November 1944

Admiral Ramsay, who proved to be a far more articulate and forceful champion of the Canadians than their own generals, starting on 9 October demanded of Eisenhower in a meeting that he either order Montgomery to make supporting the First Canadian Army in the Scheldt fighting his number one priority or sack him. Ramsay in very strong language argued to Eisenhower that the Allies could only invade Germany if Antwerp was opened, and that as long as the three Canadian divisions fighting in the Scheldt had shortages of ammunition and artillery shells because Montgomery made the Arnhem salient his first priority, then Antwerp would not be opened anytime soon. Even Brooke wrote in his diary: "I feel that Monty's strategy for once is at fault. Instead of carrying out the advance to Arnhem he ought to have made certain of Antwerp". On 9 October 1944, at Ramsay's urging, Eisenhower sent Montgomery a cable that emphasised the "supreme importance of Antwerp", that "the Canadian Army will not, repeat not, be able to attack until November unless immediately supplied with adequate ammunition", and warned that the Allied advance into Germany would totally stop by mid-November unless Antwerp was opened by October. Montgomery replied by accusing Ramsay of making "wild statements" unsupported by the facts, denying the Canadians were having to ration ammunition, and claimed that he would soon take the Ruhr thereby making the Scheldt campaign a sideshow. Montgomery further issued a memo entitled "Notes on Command in Western Europe" demanding that he once again be made land forces commander. This led to an exasperated Eisenhower telling Montgomery that the question was not the command arrangement but rather his (Montgomery's) ability and willingness to obey orders. Eisenhower further told Montgomery to either obey orders to immediately clear the mouth of the Scheldt or be sacked.

A chastised Montgomery told Eisenhower on 15 October 1944 that he was now making clearing the Scheldt his "top priority", and the ammunition shortages in the First Canadian Army, a problem which he denied even existed five days earlier, were now over as supplying the Canadians was henceforth his first concern. Simonds, now reinforced with British troops and Royal Marines, cleared the Scheldt by taking Walcheren island, the last of the German "fortresses" on the Scheldt, on 8 November 1944. With the Scheldt in Allied hands, Royal Navy minesweepers removed the German mines in the river, and Antwerp was finally opened to shipping on 28 November 1944. Reflecting Antwerp's importance, the Germans spent the winter of 1944–45 firing V-1 flying bombs and V-2 rockets at it in an attempt to shut down the port, and the German offensive in December 1944 in the Ardennes had as its ultimate objective the capture of Antwerp. Urban wrote that Montgomery's most "serious failure" in the entire war was not the well publicised Battle of Arnhem, but rather his lack of interest in opening up Antwerp, as without it the entire Allied advance from the North Sea to the Swiss Alps stalled in the autumn of 1944 for logistical reasons.

==== Operation Market Garden ====
Montgomery was able to persuade Eisenhower to allow him to test his strategy of a single thrust to the Ruhr with Operation Market Garden in September 1944. The offensive was strategically bold, although Lieutenant General Humfrey Gale, the "senior administrative and logistics officer" for SHAEF (Supreme Headquarters Allied Expeditionary Force) considered Montgomery's narrow-thrust strategy to be "logistically unrealistic", and in his opinion "a ruse merely to demonstrate later that he had been prevented from winning the war quickly by Eisenhower's caution." At a strategy meeting on 10 September 1944, Montgomery became so belligerent that Eisenhower was prompted into saying "Steady, Monty! You can't speak to me like that. I'm your boss." Following the Allied breakout from Normandy, Eisenhower favored pursuing the German armies northwards and eastwards to the Rhine on a broad front. Eisenhower relied on speed, which in turn depended on logistics, which were "stretched to the limit". SHAEF did provide Montgomery with additional resources, principally additional locomotives and rolling stock, and priority for air supply. Eisenhower's decision to launch Market Garden was influenced by his desire to keep the retreating Germans under pressure, and by the pressure from the United States to use the First Allied Airborne Army as soon as possible.

Montgomery's plan for Operation Market Garden (17–25 September 1944) was to outflank the Siegfried Line and cross the Rhine, setting the stage for later offensives into the Ruhr region. The 21st Army Group would attack north from Belgium, 60 miles (97 km) through the Netherlands, across the Rhine and consolidate north of Arnhem on the far side of the Rhine. The risky plan required three Airborne Divisions to capture numerous intact bridges along a single-lane road, on which an entire corps had to attack and use as its main supply route. The offensive failed to achieve its objectives.

Both Churchill and Montgomery claimed that the operation was nearly or 90% successful, "since they had got nine-tenths of the way to Arnhem", prompting Air Chief Marshal Tedder to derisively comment that "one jumps off a cliff with an even higher success rate, until the last few inches." However, in Montgomery's equivocal acceptance of responsibility he blames lack of support, and also refers to the Battle of the Scheldt, which was undertaken by Canadian troops not involved in Market Garden. Montgomery later said:

It was a bad mistake on my part—I underestimated the difficulties of opening up the approaches to Antwerp ... I reckoned the Canadian Army could do it while we were going for the Ruhr. I was wrong ... In my—prejudiced—view, if the operation had been properly backed from its inception, and given the aircraft, ground forces, and administrative resources necessary for the job, it would have succeeded in spite of my mistakes, or the adverse weather, or the presence of the 2nd SS Panzer Corps in the Arnhem area. I remain Market Garden's unrepentant advocate.

In the aftermath of Market Garden, Montgomery made holding the Arnhem salient his first priority, arguing that the British Second Army might still be able to break through and reach the wide open plains of northern Germany, and that he might be able to take the Ruhr by the end of October. The Germans under Generalfeldmarschall Walther Model attempted to retake the Nijmegen salient in early October, but were beaten back. In the meantime, the First Canadian Army finally achieved the task of clearing the mouth of the river Scheldt, despite the fact that, in the words of Copp and Vogel, "Montgomery's Directive required the Canadians to continue to fight alone for almost two weeks in a battle which everyone agreed could only be won with the aid of additional divisions".

==== Battle of the Bulge ====
On 16 December 1944, at the start of the Battle of the Bulge, Montgomery's 21st Army Group was on the northern flank of the allied lines. Bradley's US 12th Army Group was to Montgomery's south, with William Simpson's U.S. Ninth Army adjacent to 21st Army Group, Courtney Hodges' U.S. First Army holding the Ardennes and Patton's U.S. Third Army further south.

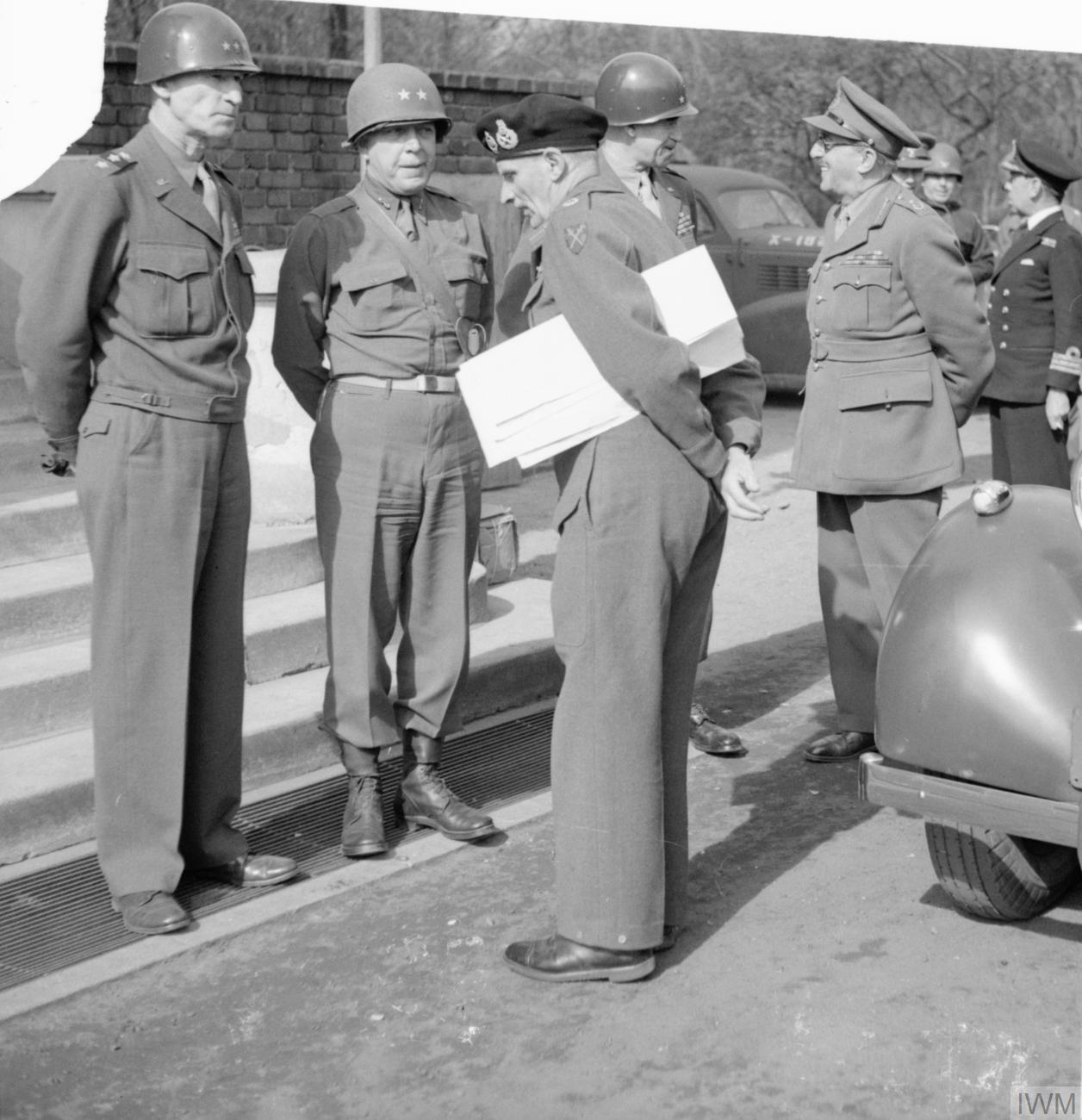
Field Marshal Montgomery talking with Lieutenant General Simpson, GOC U.S. Ninth Army, and Major General John Anderson, GOC U.S. XVI Corps. Behind are Lieutenant General Bradley and Field Marshal Brooke.

SHAEF believed the Wehrmacht was no longer capable of launching a major offensive, and that no offensive could be launched through such rugged terrain as the Ardennes Forest. Because of this, the area was held by refitting and newly arrived American formations. The Wehrmacht planned to exploit this by making a surprise attack through the Ardennes Forest whilst bad weather grounded Allied air power, splitting the Allied Armies in two. They would then turn north to recapture the port of Antwerp. If the attack were to succeed in capturing Antwerp, the whole of 21st Army Group, along with U.S. Ninth Army and most of U.S. First Army would be trapped without supplies behind German lines.

The attack initially advanced rapidly, splitting U.S. 12th Army Group in two, with all of U.S. Ninth Army and the bulk of U.S. First Army on the northern shoulder of the German 'bulge'. The 12th Army Group commander, Bradley, was located in Luxembourg, making command of the U.S. forces north of the bulge problematic. As Montgomery was the nearest army group commander on the ground, on 20 December, Eisenhower temporarily transferred command of U.S. Ninth Army and U.S. First Army to Montgomery's 21st Army Group. Bradley was "concerned because it might discredit the American command" but that it might mean Montgomery would commit more of his reserves to the battle. In practice the change led to "great resentment on the part of many Americans, particularly at Headquarters, 12th Army Group, and Third Army".

With the British and American forces under Montgomery's command holding the northern flank of the German assault, General Patton's Third Army, which was 90 miles (140 km) to the south, turned north and fought its way through the severe weather and German opposition to relieve the besieged American forces in Bastogne. Four days after Montgomery took command of the northern flank, the bad weather cleared and the USAAF and RAF resumed operations, inflicting heavy casualties on German troops and vehicles. Six days after Montgomery took command of the northern flank, Patton's Third Army relieved the besieged American forces in Bastogne. Unable to advance further, and running out of fuel, the Wehrmacht abandoned the offensive.

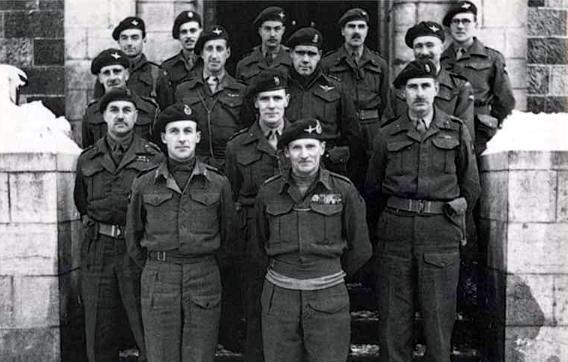
Field Marshal Montgomery and senior officers of the 6th Airborne Division in the Ardennes, January 1945

Morelock states that Montgomery was preoccupied with leading a "single thrust offensive" to Berlin as the overall commander of Allied ground forces, and that he accordingly treated the Ardennes counteroffensive "as a sideshow, to be finished with the least possible effort and expenditure of resources."

Montgomery subsequently wrote of his actions:

The first thing to do was to see the battle on the northern flank as one whole, to ensure the vital areas were held securely, and to create reserves for counter-attack. I embarked on these measures: I put British troops under command of the Ninth Army to fight alongside American soldiers, and made that Army take over some of the First Army Front. I positioned British troops as reserves behind the First and Ninth Armies until such time as American reserves could be created.

After the war Hasso von Manteuffel, who commanded the 5th Panzer Army in the Ardennes, was imprisoned awaiting trial for war crimes. During this period he was interviewed by B. H. Liddell Hart, a British author who has since been accused of putting words in the mouths of German generals, and attempting to "rewrite the historical record". After conducting several interviews via an interpreter, Liddell Hart in a subsequent book attributed to Manteuffel the following statement about Montgomery's contribution to the battle in the Ardennes:

The operations of the American 1st Army had developed into a series of individual holding actions. Montgomery's contribution to restoring the situation was that he turned a series of isolated actions into a coherent battle fought according to a clear and definite plan. It was his refusal to engage in premature and piecemeal counter-attacks which enabled the Americans to gather their reserves and frustrate the German attempts to extend their breakthrough.

However, American historian Stephen Ambrose, writing in 1997, maintained that "Putting Monty in command of the northern flank had no effect on the battle". Ambrose wrote that: "Far from directing the victory, Montgomery had gotten in everyone's way, and had botched the counter-attack." General Omar Bradley blamed Montgomery's "stagnating conservatism" for his failure to counter-attack when ordered to do so by Eisenhower.

Command of U.S. First Army reverted to 12th Army Group on 17 January 1945, whilst command of U.S. Ninth Army remained with 21st Army Group for the coming operations to cross the Rhine.

==== Crossing the Rhine ====
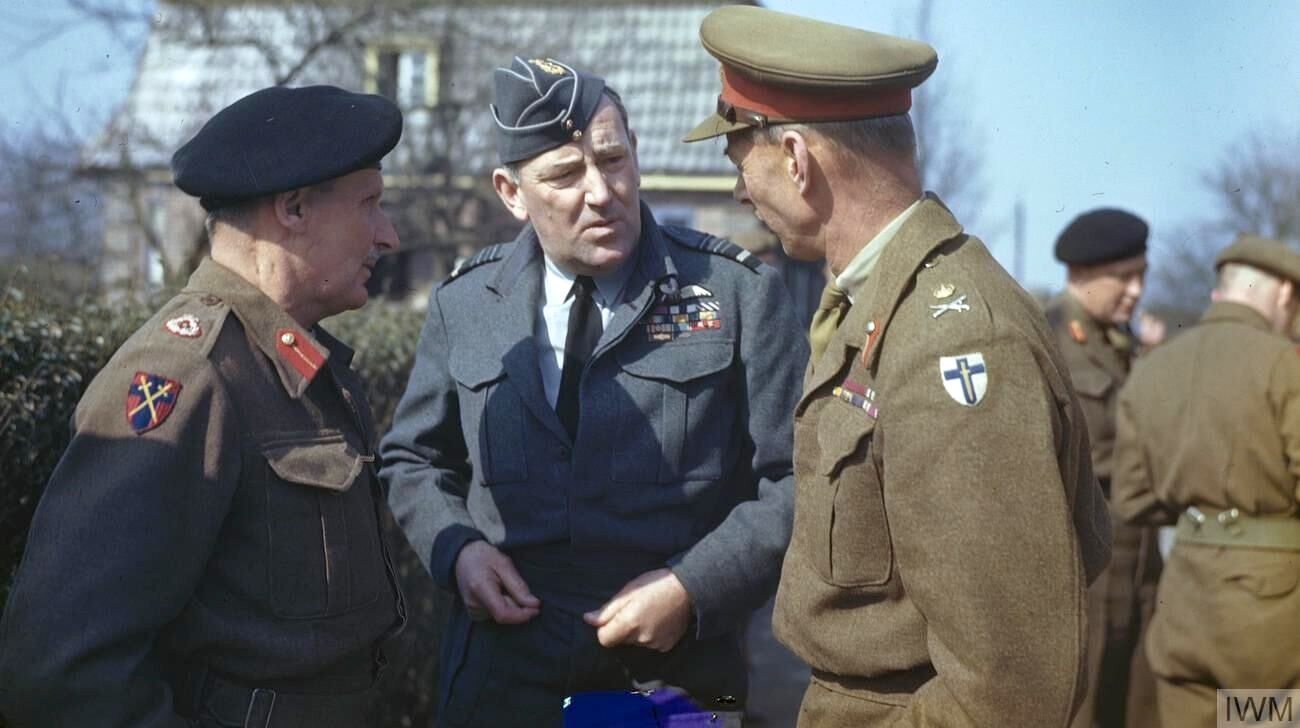
Montgomery (left), Air Marshal Sir Arthur Coningham (centre) and the commander of the British Second Army, Lieutenant-general Sir Miles Dempsey, talking after a conference in which Montgomery gave the order for the Second Army to begin Operation Plunder

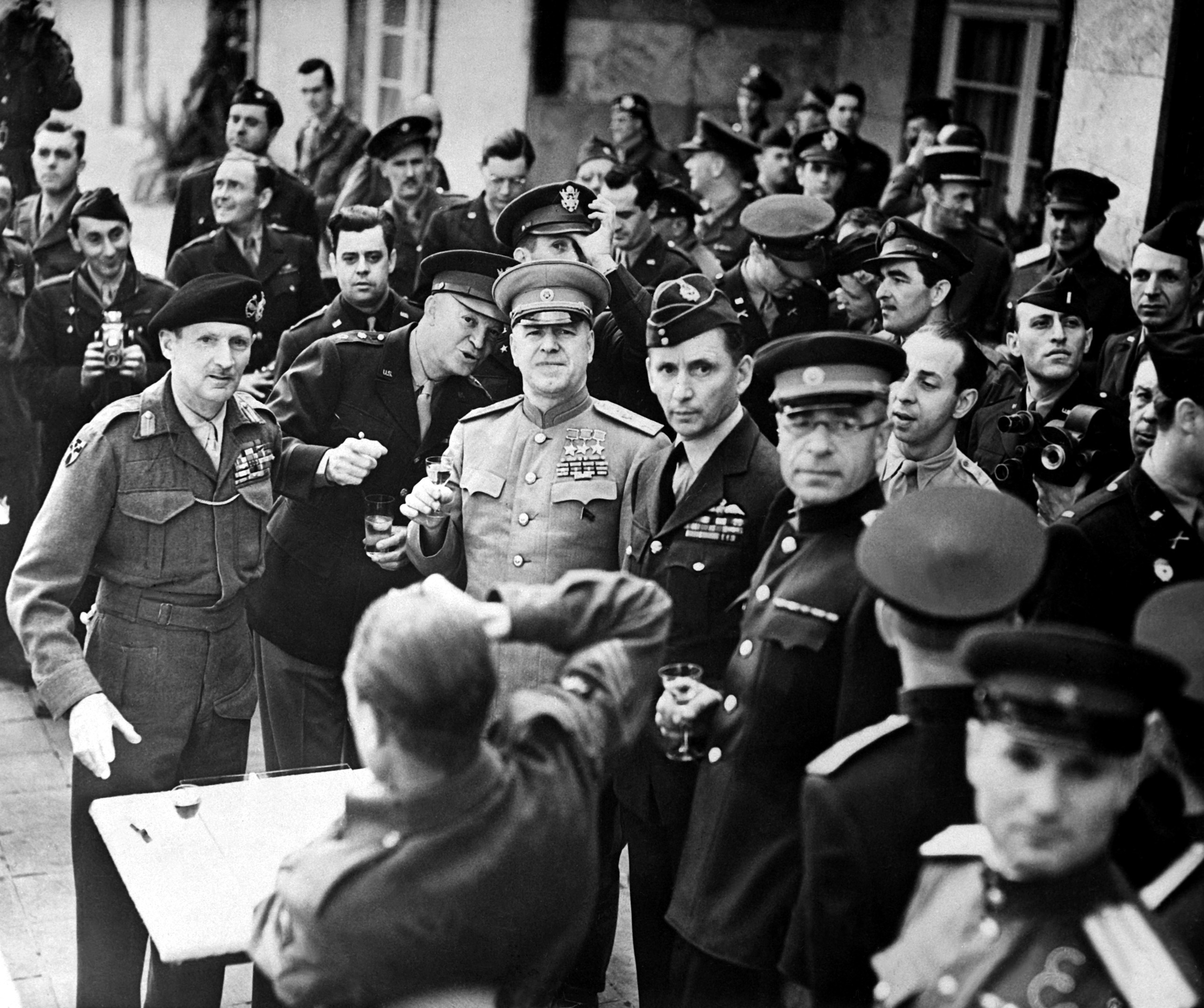
Montgomery was awarded the Order of Victory on 5 June 1945. Dwight Eisenhower, Georgy Zhukov and Sir Arthur Tedder were also present.

In February 1945, Montgomery's 21st Army Group advanced to the Rhine in Operation Veritable and Operation Grenade. It crossed the Rhine on 24 March 1945, in Operation Plunder, which took place two weeks after U.S. First Army had crossed the Rhine after capturing the Ludendorff Bridge during the Battle of Remagen, and two days after Patton's Third Army crossed the Rhine at Oppenheim.

21st Army Group's river crossing was followed by the encirclement of the Ruhr Pocket. During this battle, U.S. Ninth Army, which had remained part of 21st Army Group after the Battle of the Bulge, formed the northern arm of the envelopment of German Army Group B, with U.S. First Army forming the southern arm. The two armies linked up on 1 April 1945, encircling 370,000 German troops, and on 4 April 1945, Ninth Army reverted to Omar Bradley's 12th Army Group.

By the war's end, the remaining formations of 21st Army group, First Canadian Army and British Second Army, had liberated the northern part of the Netherlands and captured much of north-west Germany, occupied Hamburg and Rostock and sealed off the Jutland peninsula.

On 4 May 1945, on Lüneburg Heath, Montgomery accepted the surrender of German forces in north-west Germany, Denmark and the Netherlands.

Stephen Hart has argued Montgomery and the British high command were not only concerned about winning the war, but also conserving sufficient manpower to maintain British leadership and prestige within its empire and in post-war Europe in particular. This led to a strategy of "casualty conservation" and "excessive caution". Other academic commentators have suggested that the British strategy was "to avoid the heavy casualties of the major battles of the First World War"."

== Later life ==
=== Post-war military career ===
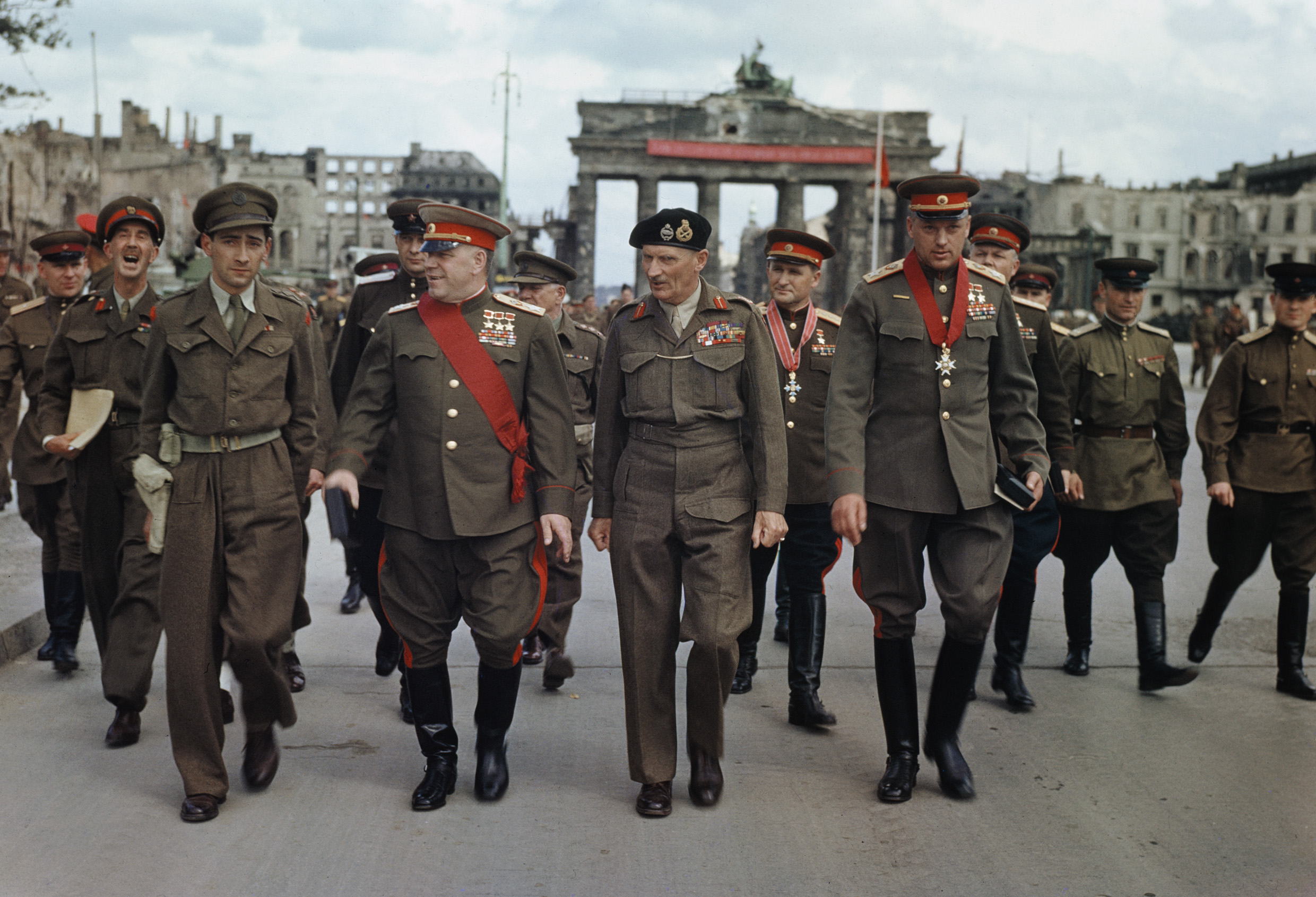
Montgomery and Soviet Marshals Georgy Zhukov (red sash) and Konstantin Rokossovsky (medal with solid red ribbon) with General Vasily Sokolovsky (medal with red and white ribbon) leave the Brandenburg Gate on 12 July 1945 after being decorated by Montgomery.

After the war, Montgomery became the C-in-C of the British Army of the Rhine (BAOR), the name given to the British Occupation Forces, and was the British member of the Allied Control Council.

==== Chief of the Imperial General Staff ====
Montgomery was Chief of the Imperial General Staff (CIGS) from 1946 to 1948, succeeding Alan Brooke. However, Montgomery was barely on speaking terms with his fellow service chiefs, sending his deputy Kenneth Crawford to attend their meetings and he clashed particularly with Sir Arthur Tedder, who was by now Chief of the Air Staff (CAS).

As CIGS, Montgomery toured Africa in 1947 and in a secret 1948 report to Prime Minister Clement Attlee's government proposed a "master plan" to amalgamate British Africa territories and to exploit the raw materials of Africa, thereby counteracting the loss of British influence in Asia. Montgomery sought to strengthen white rule to serve as a bulwark against communism. He described Africans as uncivilized, stating "he is a complete savage and is quite incapable of developing the country himself." His statements were publicised in 1999. After learning of Montgomery's remarks, one of his biographers, Lord Chalfont, said his reputation had been "irredeemably damaged... I find it very disappointing and depressing."

When Montgomery's term of office expired, Prime Minister Attlee appointed Sir William Slim from retirement with the rank of field marshal as his successor. When Montgomery protested that he had told his protégé, General Sir John Crocker, former commander of I Corps in the 1944–45 North-West Europe Campaign, that the job was to be his, Attlee is said to have retorted "Untell him."

==== Western Union Defence Organisation ====
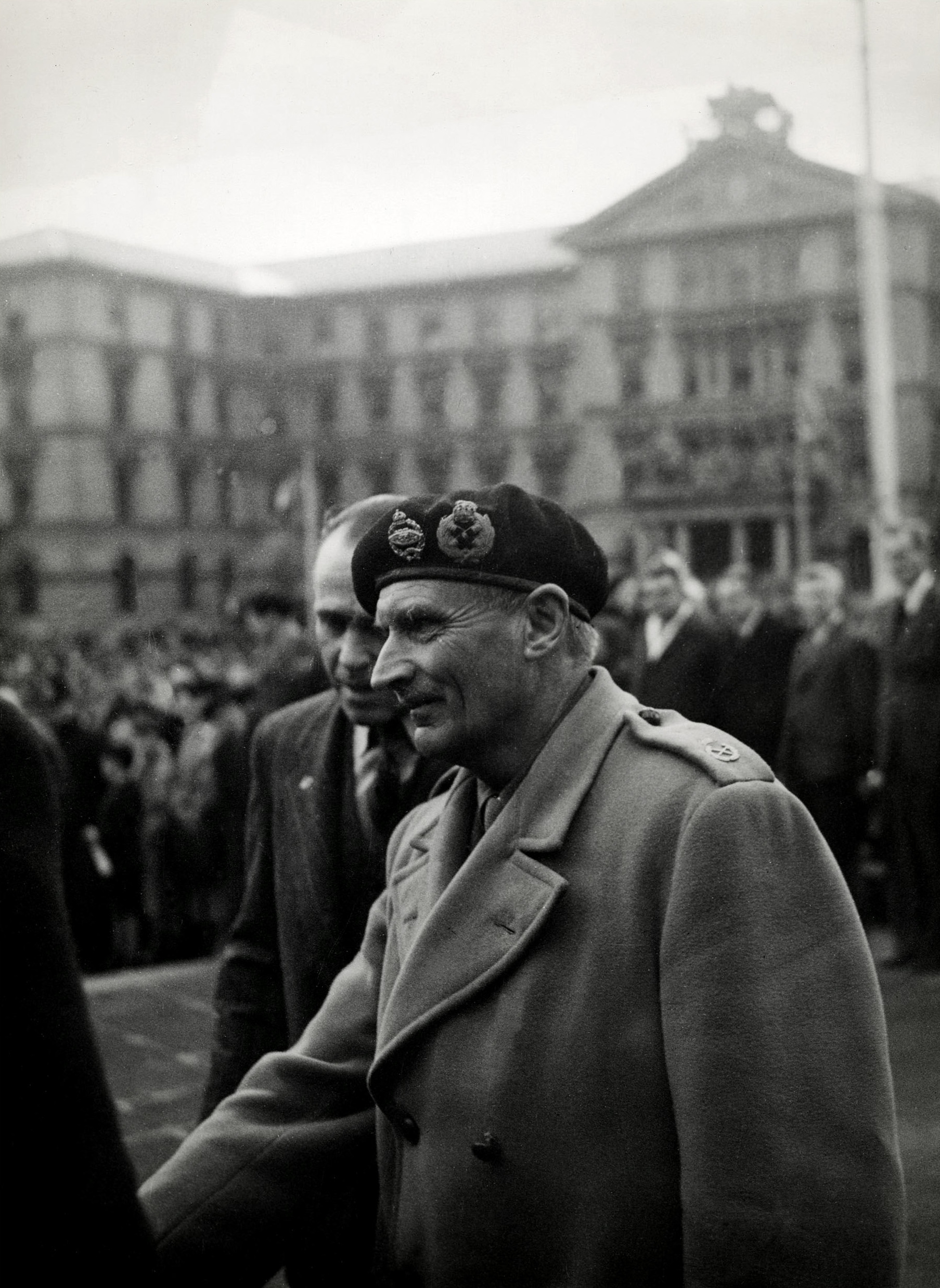
Montgomery in New Zealand in 1947

Montgomery was then appointed chairman of the Western Union Defence Organisation's C-in-C committee. Volume 3 of Nigel Hamilton's Life of Montgomery of Alamein gives an account of the bickering between Montgomery and his land forces chief, French General Jean de Lattre de Tassigny, which created splits through the Union headquarters.

==== NATO ====
On the creation of the North Atlantic Treaty Organisation's Supreme Headquarters Allied Powers Europe in 1951, Montgomery became Eisenhower's deputy. He would continue to serve under Eisenhower's successors, Generals Matthew Ridgway and Alfred Gruenther, until his retirement, aged nearly 71, in 1958.

=== Personal ===
Montgomery was created 1st Viscount Montgomery of Alamein in the 1946 New Year Honours.

Montgomery's mother, Maude Montgomery, died in 1949. Montgomery did not attend the funeral, claiming he was "too busy".

Montgomery was an honorary member of the Winkle Club, a charity in Hastings, East Sussex, and introduced Winston Churchill to the club in 1955. He was President of Portsmouth Football Club between 1944 and 1961, and chairman of the governing body of St. John's School, Leatherhead from 1951 to 1966.

On Saturday 20 December 1969, Montgomery was Roy Plomley's thousandth 'castaway' on the BBC Radio Show Desert Island Discs. The seven discs Montgomery chose to accompany him on the imaginary deserted island were: "Battle Hymn of the Republic" (sung by The Tabernacle Choir at Temple Square), "My Love is Like A Red, Red Rose" (sung by Kenneth McKellar), "You are my heart's delight" (from Franz Lehár's The Land of Smiles), Invitation to the Dance (by Carl Maria von Weber), "Sei nicht bös" (from Carl Zeller's Der Obersteiger), "All Through the Night" (sung by Treorchy Male Choir), "Cockles and Mussels" (sung by William Clauson) and Felix Mendelssohn's "O, for the wings of a dove". He chose a piano (with playing instructions) as his luxury item and for his book he chose his own book The History of Warfare (1968). His favourite disc was "Sei nicht bös" (Don't Be Cross) sung by Elisabeth Schwarzkopf.

=== Opinions ===
==== Memoirs ====
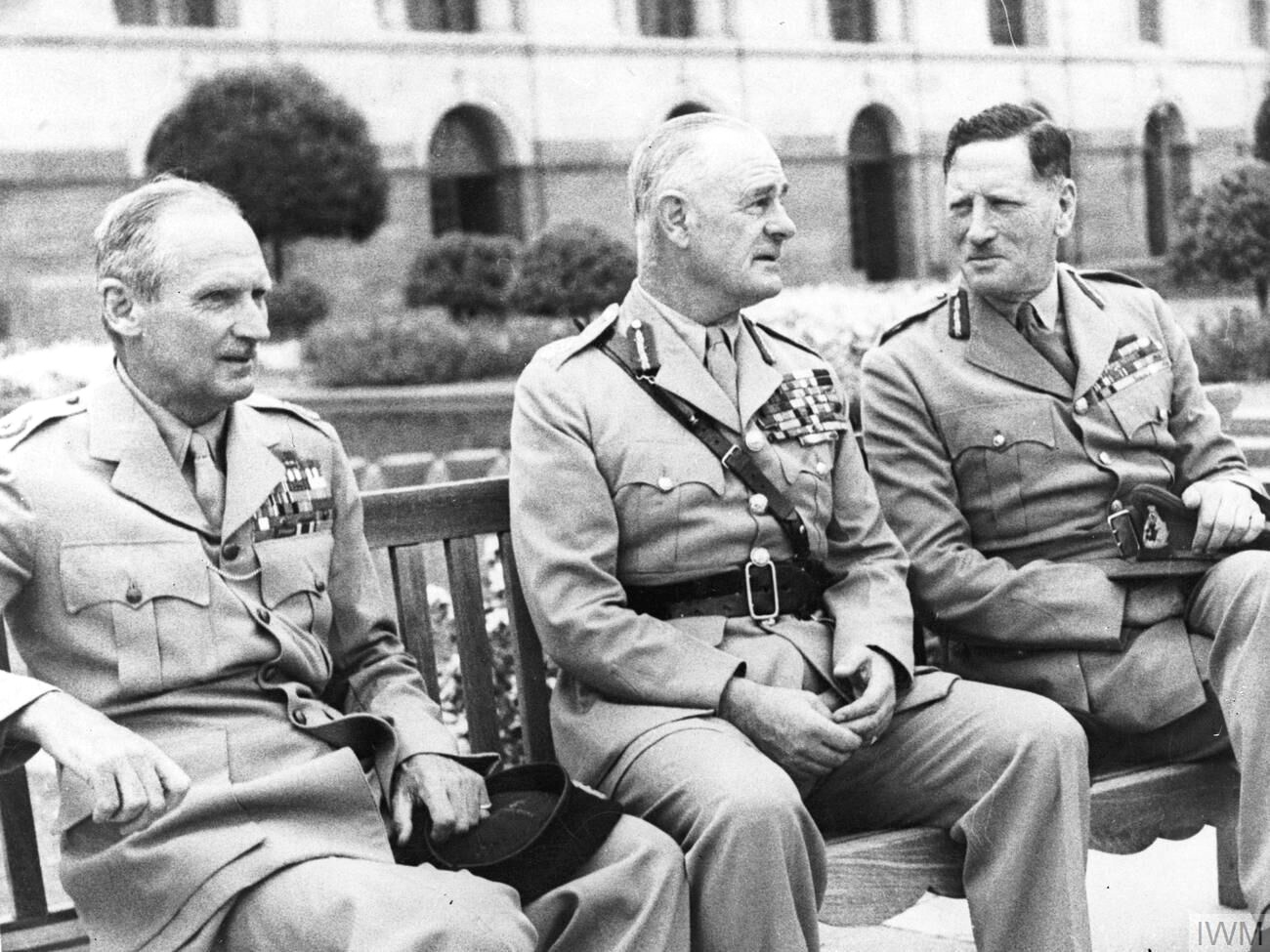
Lord Montgomery as CIGS with Lord Wavell, Viceroy of India, and Auchinleck, Commander in Chief Indian Army. Delhi 1946

Montgomery's memoirs (1958) criticised many of his wartime comrades in harsh terms, including Eisenhower. Montgomery was stripped of his honorary citizenship of Montgomery, Alabama, and was challenged to a duel by an Italian lawyer.

He was threatened with legal action by Field Marshal Auchinleck for suggesting that Auchinleck had intended to retreat from the Alamein position if attacked again, and had to give a radio broadcast (20 November 1958) expressing his gratitude to Auchinleck for having stabilised the front at the First Battle of Alamein. The 1960 paperback edition of Montgomery's memoirs contains a publisher's note drawing attention to that broadcast, and stating that although the reader might assume from Montgomery's text that Auchinleck had been planning to retreat "into the Nile Delta or beyond" in the publisher's view it had been Auchinleck's intention to launch an offensive as soon as the Eighth Army was "rested and regrouped".

Montgomery mentioned to the American journalist John Gunther in April 1944 that (like Alanbrooke) he kept a secret diary. Gunther remarked that it would surely be an essential source for historians. When Montgomery asked whether it would be worth money one day, Gunther suggested "at least $100,000." This was converted into pounds sterling, and he is supposed to have grinned and said "Well, I guess I won't die in the poor house after all."

==== Military opinions ====
Montgomery twice met Israeli general Moshe Dayan. After an initial meeting in the early 1950s, Montgomery met Dayan again in the 1960s to discuss the Vietnam War, which Dayan was studying. Montgomery was harshly critical of US strategy in Vietnam, which involved deploying large numbers of combat troops, aggressive bombing attacks, and uprooting entire village populations and forcing them into strategic hamlets. Montgomery said that the Americans' most important problem was that they had no clear objective, and allowed local commanders to set military policy. At the end of their meeting, Montgomery asked Dayan to tell the Americans, in his name, that they were "insane". In a 1968 interview, he expressed the opinion that the United States should give up its efforts and accept a Communist-dominated Vietnam, remarking "you have got to stop this war. You can't win. What is the point of all these casualties?" He argued that the war was unwinnable and making the United States internationally unpopular. He expressed the opinion that China would eventually dominate Asia, with all countries bordering China except for India eventually come under Chinese influence and that the United States should focus on maintaining dominance of the oceans rather than committing land forces to Asia.

During a visit to the Alamein battlefields in May 1967, he bluntly told high-ranking Egyptian Army officers that they would lose any war with Israel, a warning that was shown to be justified only a few weeks later in the Six-Day War.

==== Social opinions ====
In retirement, Montgomery publicly supported apartheid after a visit to South Africa in 1962, and after a visit to China declared himself impressed by the Chinese leadership led by Mao Tse-tung. He spoke out against the legalisation of homosexuality in the United Kingdom, arguing that the Sexual Offences Act 1967 was a "charter for buggery" and that "this sort of thing may be tolerated by the French, but we're British—thank God".

Montgomery was a non-smoking teetotaller, a vegetarian and a Christian.

== Death ==
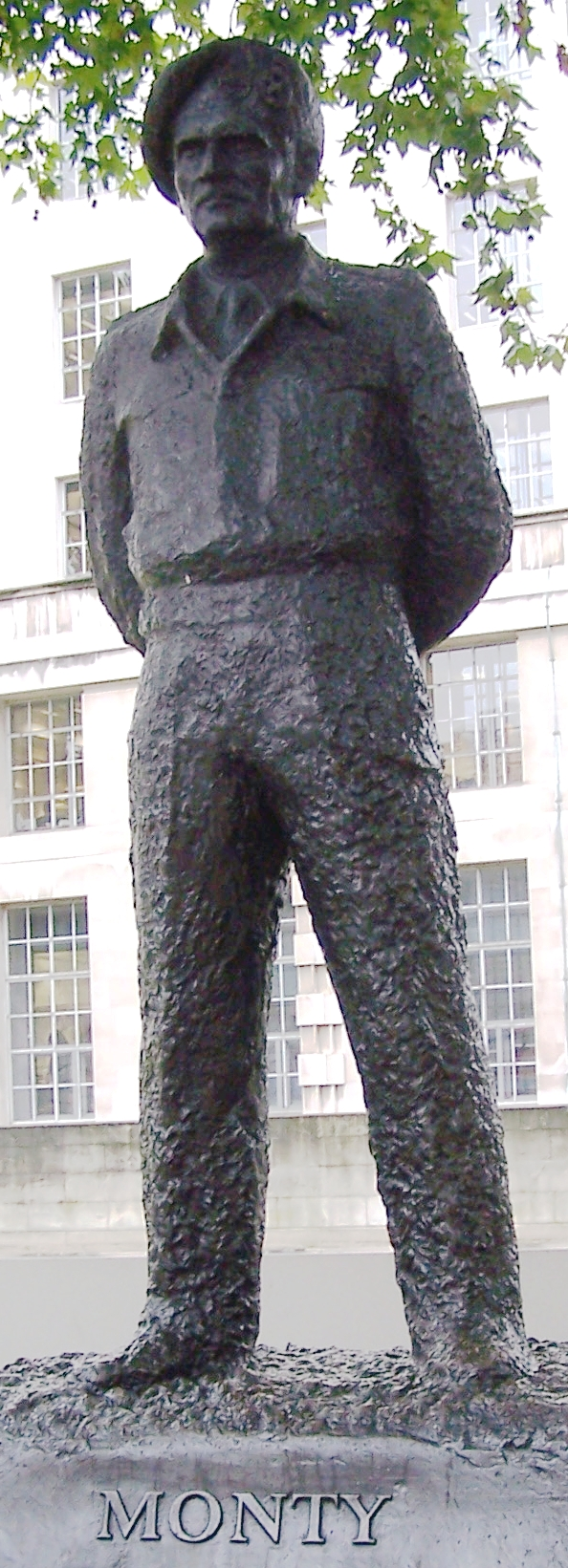
Statue of Montgomery in Whitehall, London, by Oscar Nemon, unveiled in 1980

Montgomery died in 1976 at his home Isington Mill in Isington, Hampshire, aged 88. After a funeral at St George's Chapel, Windsor, his body was buried in Holy Cross churchyard, in Binsted, Hampshire.

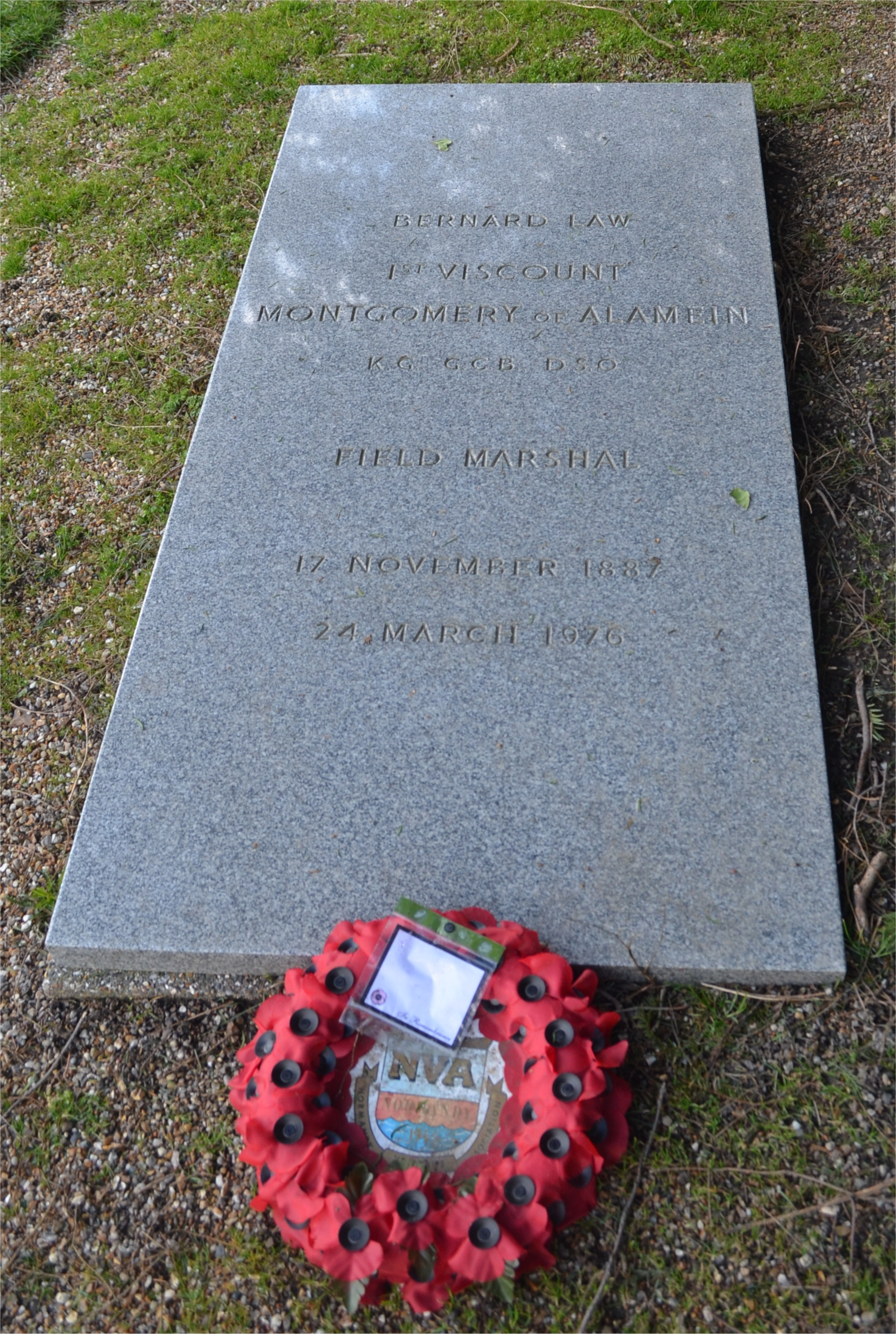
Montgomery's grave, Holy Cross churchyard, Binsted

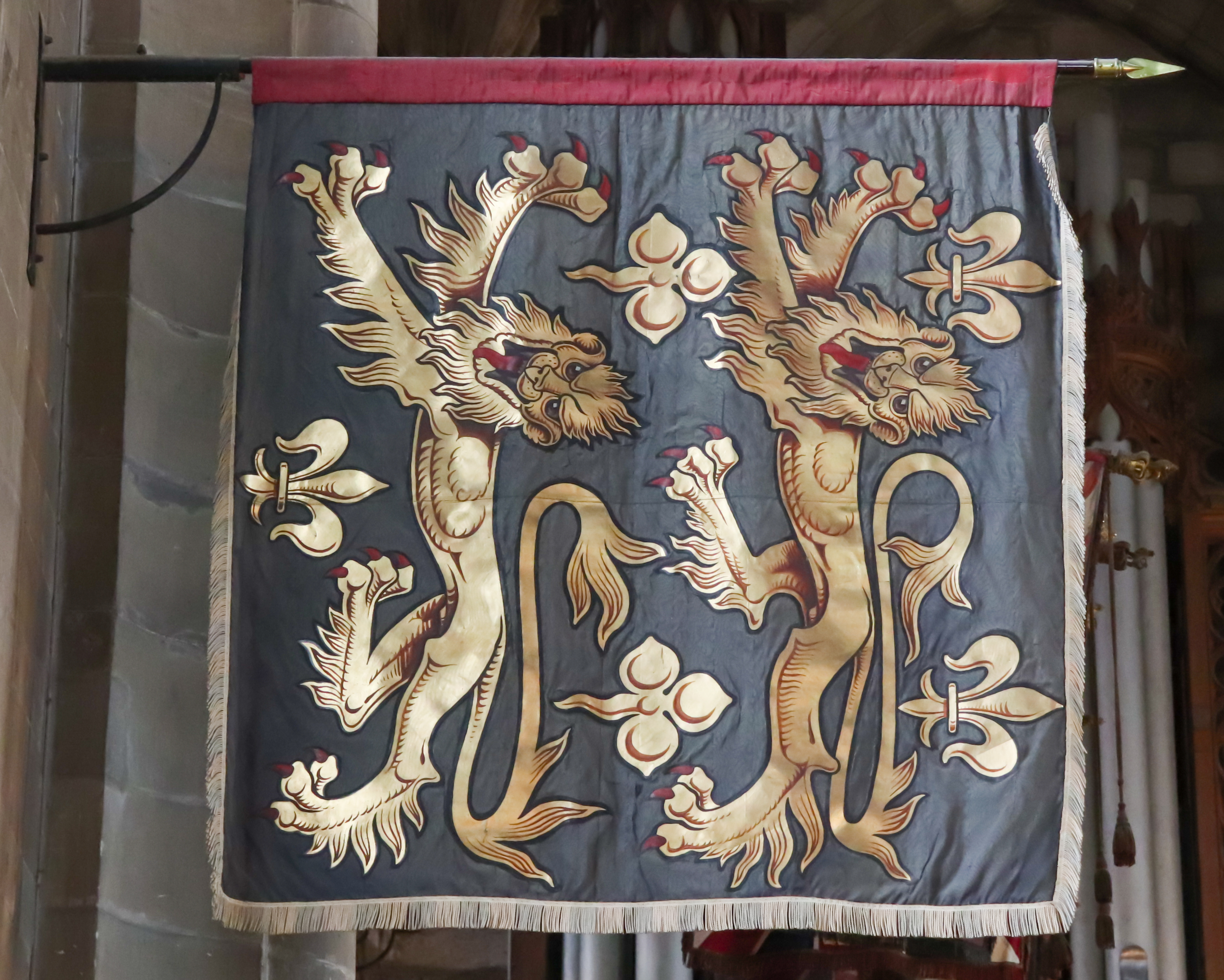
Montgomery's Garter banner on display in the Collegiate Church of St Mary, Warwick

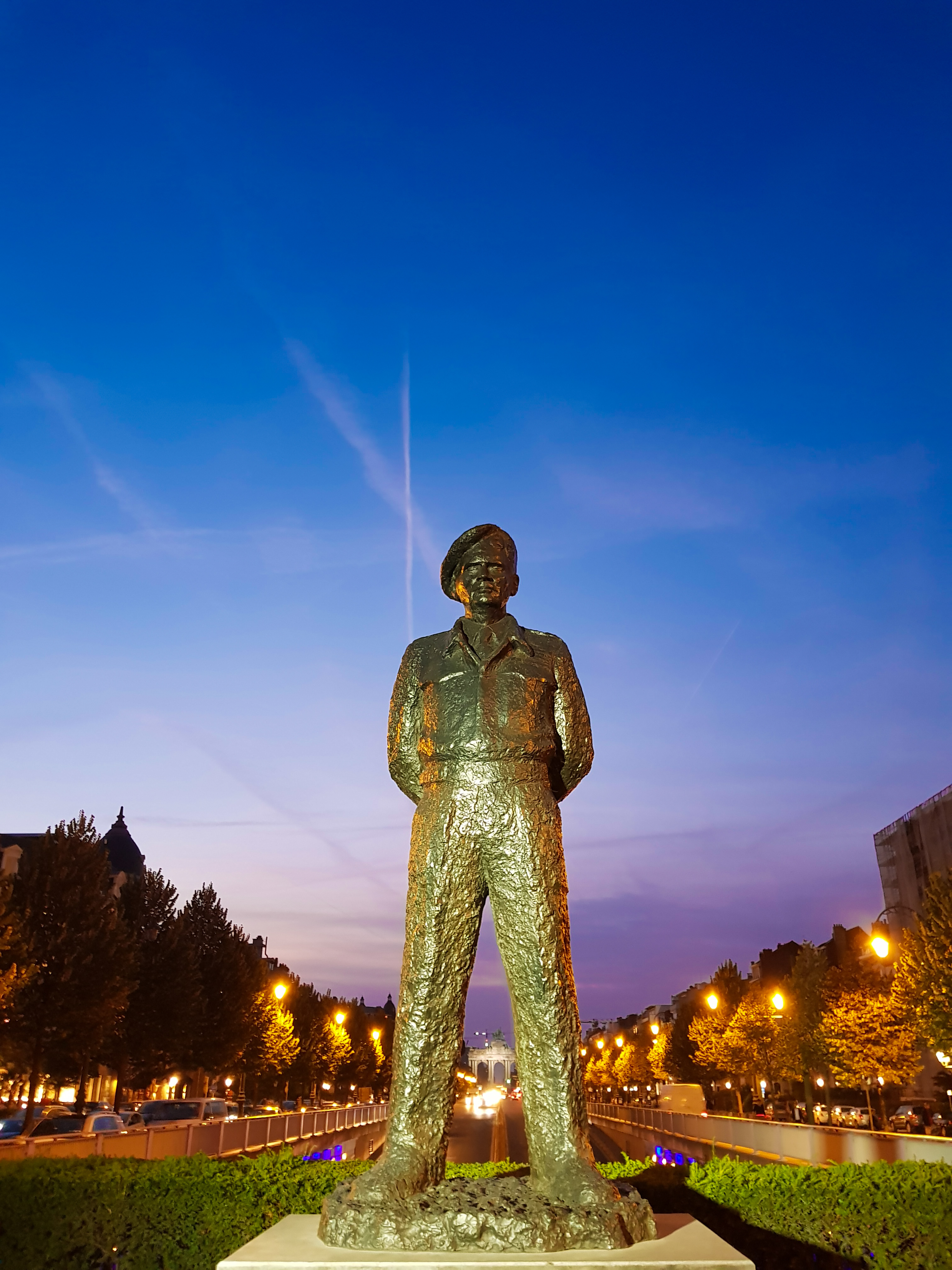
Statue of Montgomery in Montgomery Square, Brussels

== Legacy ==
- His Garter banner, which had hung in St. George's Chapel in Windsor during his lifetime, is now on display in the Collegiate Church of St Mary, Warwick.
- Montgomery's portrait by Frank O. Salisbury (1945) hangs in the National Portrait Gallery.
- A statue of Montgomery by Oscar Nemon stands outside the Ministry of Defence in Whitehall, alongside those of Field Marshal Lord Slim and Field Marshal Lord Alanbrooke.
- Montgomery gave his name to the French commune Colleville-Montgomery in Normandy.

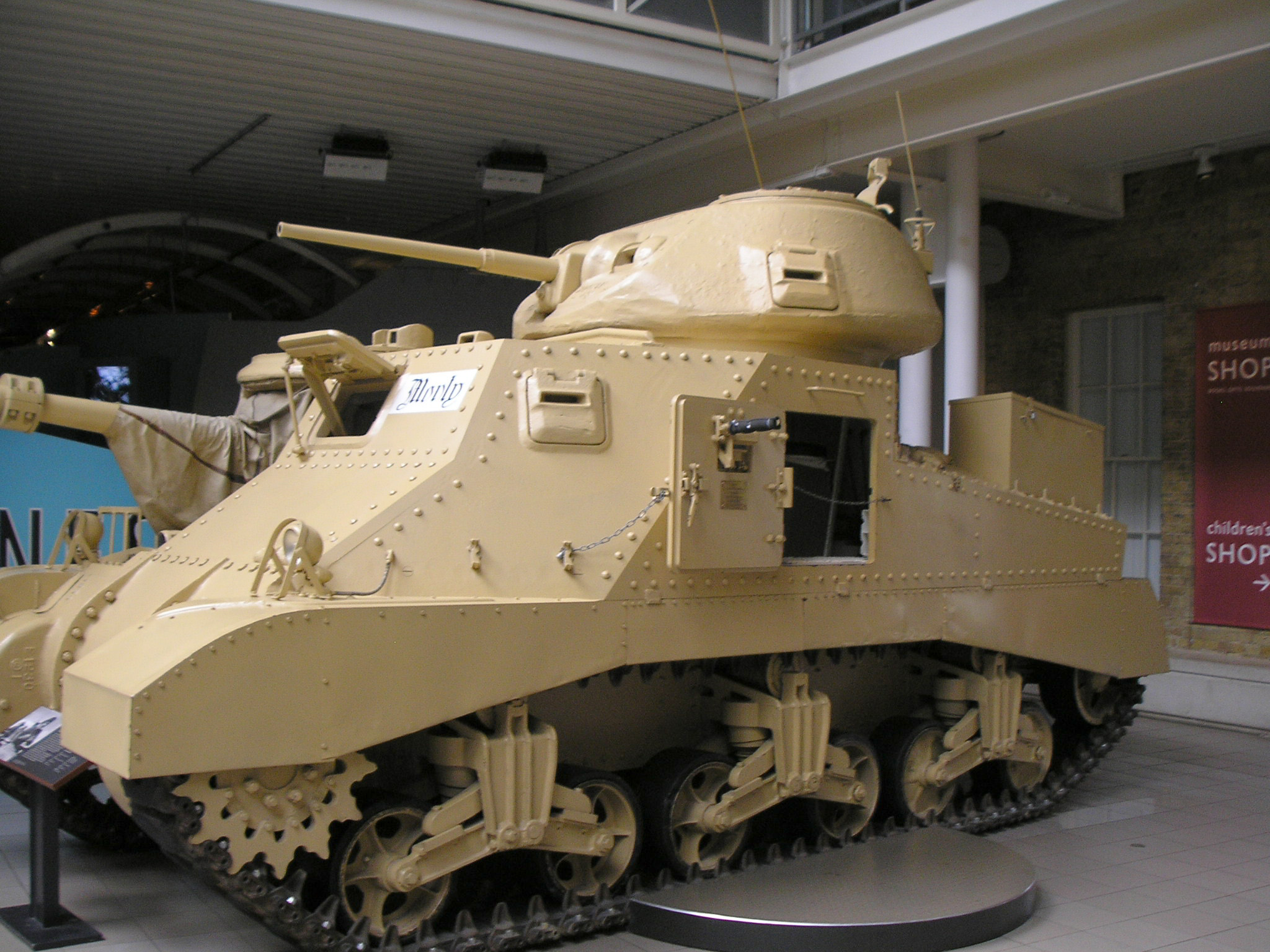
Montgomery's Grant command tank, on display at the Imperial War Museum in London

- The Imperial War Museum holds a variety of material relating to Montgomery in its collections. These include Montgomery's Grant command tank (on display in the atrium at the museum's London branch), his command caravans as used in North West Europe (on display at IWM Duxford), and his papers are held by the museum's Department of Documents. The museum maintains a permanent exhibition about Montgomery, entitled Monty: Master of the Battlefield.
- The World Champion Field Marshal Montgomery Pipe Band from Northern Ireland is named after him.
- Montgomery's Rolls-Royce staff car is on display at the Royal Logistic Corps Museum, Worthy Down, Hampshire.
- The Montgomery cocktail is a martini mixed at a ratio of 15 parts gin to 1 part vermouth, and popular with Ernest Hemingway at Harry's Bar in Venice. The drink was facetiously named for Montgomery's supposed refusal to go into battle unless his numerical advantage was at least fifteen to one, and it appeared in Hemingway's 1950 novel Across the River and into the Trees. Ironically, following severe internal injuries received in the First World War, Montgomery himself could neither smoke nor drink.
- Montgomery appears as a character, "The Field Marshal," in Anthony Powell's 1968 novel, The Military Philosophers, the ninth volume of his twelve volume series, A Dance to the Music of Time. Montgomery is one of the few real people to appear as themselves in the fictional series. Powell knew Montgomery during the war when he worked as a liaison officer.

== Personality ==
Throughout the war, Montgomery was notorious for his lack of tact and diplomacy. Even his "patron", the Chief of the Imperial General Staff, General Sir Alan Brooke, frequently mentions it in his war diaries: "he is liable to commit untold errors in lack of tact" and "I had to haul him over the coals for his usual lack of tact and egotistical outlook which prevented him from appreciating other people's feelings". Montgomery suffered from "an overbearing conceit and an uncontrollable urge for self-promotion." General Hastings Ismay, who was at the time Winston Churchill's chief staff officer and trusted military adviser, once said of him: "I have come to the conclusion that his love of publicity is a disease, like alcoholism or taking drugs, and that it sends him equally mad." The psychiatrist Michael Fitzgerald has argued that Montgomery was likely autistic, and it has been speculated that this was the cause of many of his apparent behaviours and eccentricities.

A notorious instance of Montgomery's behaviour occurred during the North African campaign when he bet Walter Bedell Smith that he could capture Sfax by the middle of April 1943. Smith jokingly replied that if Montgomery could do it he would give him a Flying Fortress complete with crew. Smith promptly forgot all about it, but Montgomery did not, and when Sfax was taken on 10 April, he sent a message to Smith "claiming his winnings". Smith tried to laugh it off, but Montgomery insisted on his aircraft. The incident was finally resolved by Eisenhower who, with his renowned skill in diplomacy, ensured Montgomery did get his Flying Fortress, though at a great cost in ill feeling.

Antony Beevor, in discussing Montgomery's counterproductive lack of tact in the final months of the war, described him as "insufferable". Beevor says that in January 1945 Montgomery had tried to claim far too much credit for the British (and for himself) in defeating the German counter-attack in the Ardennes in December 1944. This "crass and unpleasant blunder" helped make it impossible for Churchill and Alan Brooke to persuade Eisenhower of the need for an immediate thrust—to be led by Montgomery—through Germany to Berlin. Eisenhower discounted the viability of the "dagger thrust" approach, as it had already been agreed that Berlin would fall into the future Soviet occupation zone. Unwilling to accept heavy casualties for no gain, Eisenhower disregarded the British suggestions and continued with his conservative broad front strategy, and the Red Army reached Berlin well ahead of the Western Allies.

In August 1945, while Brooke, Sir Andrew Cunningham and Sir Charles Portal were discussing their possible successors as "Chiefs of Staff", they concluded that Montgomery would be very efficient as CIGS from the Army's point of view but that he was also very unpopular with a large proportion of the Army. Despite this, Cunningham and Portal were strongly in favour of Montgomery succeeding Brooke after his retirement. Churchill, by all accounts a faithful friend, is quoted as saying of Montgomery, "In defeat, unbeatable; in victory, unbearable."

== Honours and awards ==
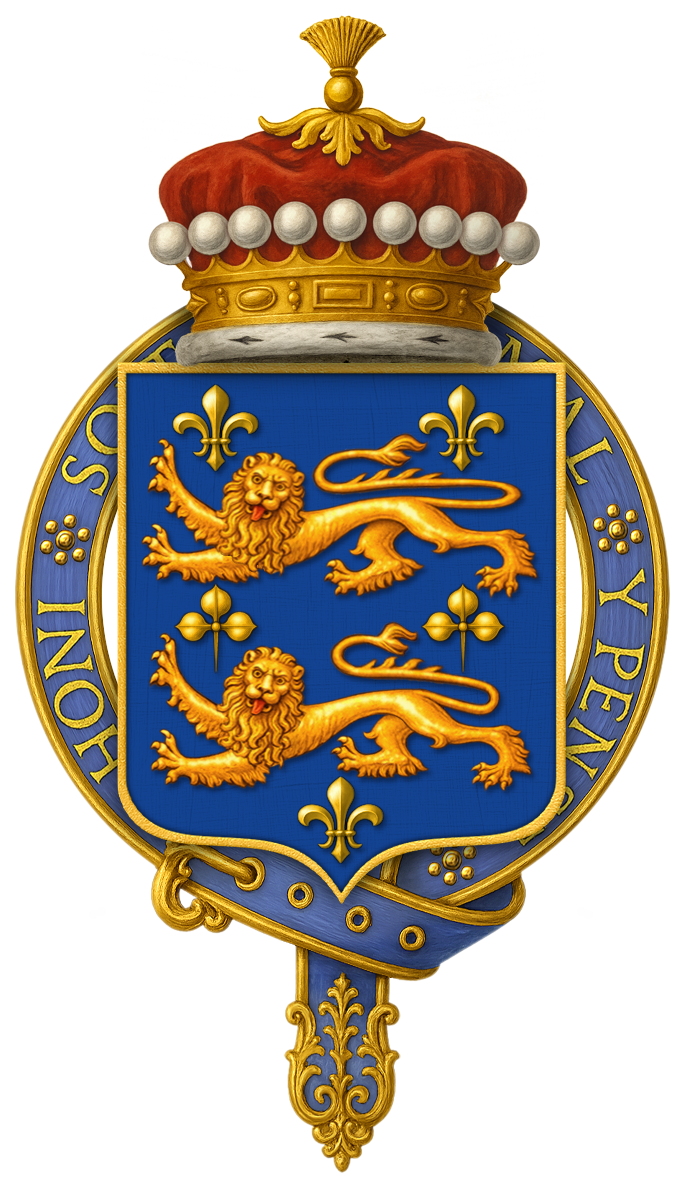
Arms of Montgomery: Azure two lions passant guardant between three fleur-de-lis two in chief and one in base and two trefoils in fess all or.

- Viscountcy as Montgomery of Alamein (UK, January 1946)
- Knight Companion of the Most Noble Order of the Garter (UK, 1946)
- Knight Grand Cross of the Most Honourable Order of the Bath (UK, 1945) KCB – 11 November 1942, CB – 11 July 1940
- Companion of the Distinguished Service Order (UK, 1914)
- Mentioned in Despatches (UK, 17 February 1915, 4 January 1917, 11 December 1917, 20 May 1918, 20 December 1918, 5 July 1919, 15 July 1939, 24 June 1943, 13 January 1944)
- 1914 Star with clasp
- British War Medal
- Victory Medal
- General Service Medal
- 1939–1945 Star
- Africa Star with "8" clasp
- Italy Star
- France and Germany Star
- War Medal 1939–1945
- Croix de Guerre 1914-1918 (France, 1919)
- Grand Cross of the Légion d'honneur (France, May 1945)
- Médaille militaire (France, 9 September 1958)
- Distinguished Service Medal (US, 1947)
- Chief Commander of the Legion of Merit (US, 10 August 1943)
- Member of the Order of Victory (USSR, 21 June 1945)
- Knight of the Order of the Elephant (Denmark, 2 August 1945)
- Grand Commander of the Order of George I (Greece, 20 June 1944)
- Silver Cross (V Class) of the Virtuti Militari (Poland, 31 October 1944)
- Grand Cross of the Military Order of the White Lion (Czechoslovakia, 1947)
- Grand Cordon of the Seal of Solomon (Ethiopia, 1949)
- Grand Officer with Palm of the Order of Leopold II (Belgium, 1947)
- Croix de Guerre 1940 with Palm (Belgium)
- Grand Cross of the Order of the Netherlands Lion (Netherlands, 16 January 1947)
- Grand Cross of the Royal Norwegian Order of St. Olav (Norway) (1951)

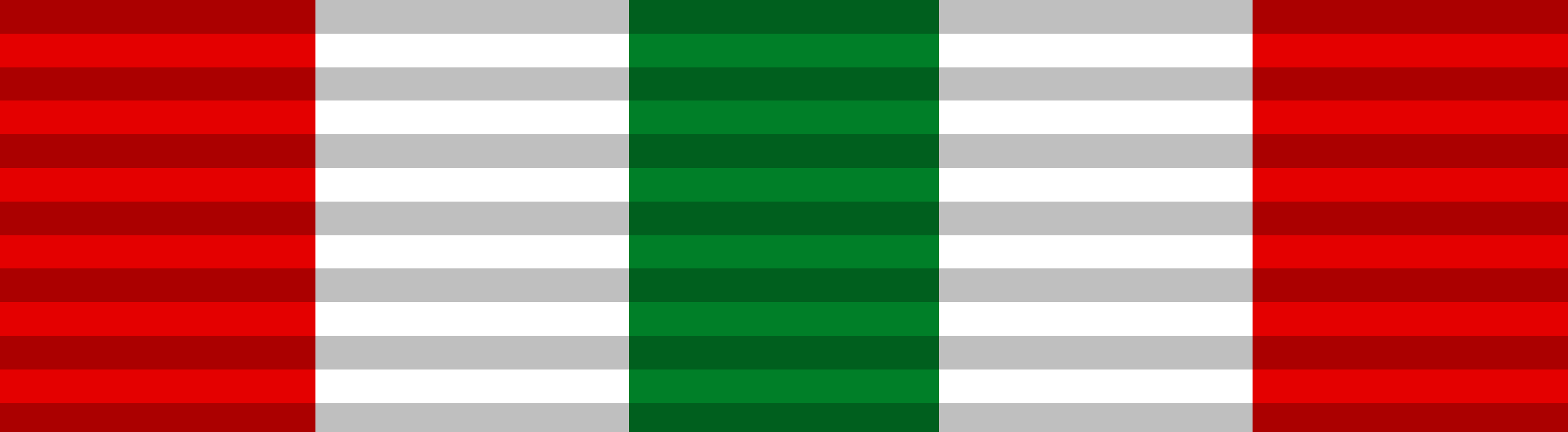

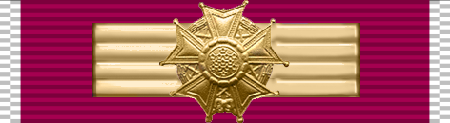

== See also ==
- Afrika Korps
- M. E. Clifton James (Montgomery's double during the Second World War)
- Tex Banwell (another double)
- Irish military diaspora
- Panzer Army Africa
- I Was Monty's Double, 1958 film adapted from the autobiography of M. E. Clifton James

Military offices
Preceded by Geoffrey Raikes	Commander, 9th Infantry Brigade; 1937–1938	Succeeded by William Robb
New title Division reformed	Commander, 8th Infantry Division; 1938–1939	Succeeded by Reade Godwin-Austen
Preceded by Denis Bernard	GOC, 3rd Infantry Division; 1939–1940	Succeeded by James Gammell
Preceded by Sir Alan Brooke	GOC II Corps, British Expeditionary Force; May–June 1940	Succeeded by Edmund Osborne
Preceded by Sir Claude Auchinleck	GOC, V Corps; 1940–1941	Succeeded by Edmond Schreiber
Preceded by Andrew Thorne	GOC, XII Corps; April–November 1941	Succeeded by James Gammell
Preceded by Bernard Paget	GOC-in-C, South-Eastern Command; 1941–1942	Succeeded by John Swayne
Preceded by Sir Claude Auchinleck	GOC-in-C, Eighth Army; 1942–1943	Succeeded by Sir Oliver Leese
Preceded by Sir Bernard Paget	GOC-in-C, 21st Army Group; 1944–1945	Post disbanded
New title New command	C-in-C British Army of the Rhine; 1945–1946	Succeeded by Sir Richard McCreery
Preceded by The Lord Alanbrooke	Chief of the Imperial General Staff; 1946–1948	Succeeded by Sir William Slim
New title	Deputy Supreme Allied Commander, Europe; 1951–1958	Succeeded by Sir Richard Gale
Peerage of the United Kingdom
New creation	Viscount Montgomery of Alamein; 1946–1976	Succeeded by David Montgomery
Honorary titles
Preceded by Clement Thomes	Colonel of the Royal Warwickshire Regiment; 1947–1963	Succeeded by Ronald Macdonald
