= Christopher Jones =

Christopher or Chris Jones may refer to:

== Arts and entertainment ==
=== Film, TV, theatre ===
- Chris Jones (filmmaker) (born 1967), British filmmaker, author, film director, screenwriter and educator
- Christopher Jones (actor, born 1941) (1941–2014), American actor
- Christopher Jones (actor, born 1982), American actor and dancer

=== Gaming ===
- Chris Jones (Access Software) (born 1955), American co-creator of the Tex Murphy detective adventure game series
- Chris Jones (game developer), founder of Obsidian Entertainment, a computer game company

=== Music ===
- Christopher Michael Jones (born 1969), American hip hop and R&B record producer
- Chris Jones (British singer) (born 1985), British singer and songwriter
- Chris Jones (American musician) (1958–2005), American musician and composer
- Chris Jones (bluegrass musician), American singer/guitarist, leader of the Night Drivers

=== Writing ===
- Chris Jones, editor of the Australian newspaper The Courier-Mail
- Christopher Jones (comics) (born 1969), American comic book artist
- Chris Jones (drama critic) (born 1963), American journalist and drama critic

== Politics ==
- Chris Jones (Arkansas politician) (born 1976), 2022 Arkansas gubernatorial candidate
- Chris Jones (Virginia politician) (born 1958), American politician in the Virginia House of Delegates

== Sports ==
=== Baseball ===
- Chris Jones (1980s outfielder) (born 1957), former outfielder in Major League Baseball, 1985–1986
- Chris Jones (1990s outfielder) (born 1965), former outfielder in Major League Baseball, 1991–2000

=== Basketball ===
- Chris Jones (basketball, born 1991), American basketball player
- Chris Jones (basketball, born 1993), American basketball player

=== Cricket ===
- Chris Jones (cricketer) (born 1990), English cricketer
- Christopher Jones (cricketer) (born 1973), former English cricketer

=== Association football ===
- Chris Jones (footballer, born 1989), Welsh footballer
- Chris Jones (footballer, born 1956), Jersey born England under-21 international footballer
- Chris Jones (footballer, born 1945), English footballer
- Chris Roosevelt Jones (born 1991), Liberian footballer

=== Gridiron football ===
- Chris Jones (center) (born 1964), American football player
- Chris Jones (cornerback) (born 1995), American football player
- Chris Jones (football coach) (born 1967), head coach and general manager in the Canadian Football League
- Chris Jones (punter) (born 1989), American football player for the Dallas Cowboys
- Chris Jones (defensive tackle, born 1990), American football defensive tackle who is currently a free agent
- Chris Jones (defensive tackle, born 1994), American football defensive tackle for the Kansas City Chiefs
- Chris Jones (wide receiver, born 1972), American player of Canadian football
- Chris Jones (wide receiver, born 1982), Canadian football wide receiver
- Chris T. Jones (born 1971), former American football player for the Philadelphia Eagles

=== Other sports ===
- Christopher Jones (cyclist) (born 1979), American cyclist
- Chris Jones (gymnast) (born 1987), British gymnast
- Chris Jones (racing driver) (born 1987), American racing driver
- Chris Jones (rugby union) (born 1980), English rugby union footballer
- Chris Jones (sprinter) (born 1973), American sprint athlete
- Chris Jones (sprinter, born 1976), American sprinter, 1997 All-American for the Houston Cougars track and field team
- Chris Jones (sprinter, born 1977), American sprinter, 1998 All-American for the Illinois Fighting Illini track and field team
- Christopher Jones (water polo) (1884–1937), British gold medalist in the 1920 Olympics
- Chris Jones (mountain climber) (1939–2024), British-American mountain climber

== Other people ==
- Christopher Jones (Mayflower captain) (c. 1570–1622), English sailor, master of the Mayflower
- Christopher Jones (Anglican bishop) (born 1964), Australian Anglican assistant bishop in the Anglican Diocese of Tasmania
- Christopher Jones (Roman Catholic bishop) (1936–2018), Irish Roman Catholic prelate, Bishop of Elphin
- Christopher Jones (biologist) (born 1976), American naturalist, inventor and writer on evolutionary medicine
- Chris Braithwaite, aka "Chris Jones" (c. 1885–1944), Barbadian-born sailor and London unionist
- Christopher Darnell Jones Jr., perpetrator of the 2022 University of Virginia shooting
- Christopher W. Jones (born 1973), American chemical engineer and researcher

== See also ==
- Jones (surname)
