= 1993 Australia Day Honours =

The 1993 Australia Day Honours are appointments to various orders and honours to recognise and reward good works by Australian citizens. The list was announced on 26 January 1993 by the Governor General of Australia, Bill Hayden.

The Australia Day Honours are the first of the two major annual honours lists, the first announced to coincide with Australia Day (26 January), with the other being the Queen's Birthday Honours, which are announced on the second Monday in June.

† indicates an award given posthumously.

== Order of Australia ==
=== Companion (AC) ===
==== General Division ====
Recipient	Citation	Notes
Anthony Joseph Ayers, AO	For service to leadership in the development and implementation of administrative structures, systems and procedures	
The Reverend Doctor Francis Stanislaus Flynn, AO	For service to medicine, particularly through research into Aboriginal eye health and to the community	
Her Excellency Mary Marguerite Leneen Forde	For service to the law, to improving the status of women and to economic and business development	
The Honourable Sir James Augustine Gobbo	For service to the law, to hospital administration and to the community, particularly through the promotion of multicultural affairs	
Emeritus Professor Dorothy Hill, CBE	For service to geology particularly as a palaeontologist and to research and learning	
Emeritus Professor Dame Leonie Judith Kramer, DBE	For service to Australian literature, to education and to the community	
James Bolton Leslie, AO MC	For service to the aviation industry and to community and cultural affairs	
Raymond Wells Whitrod, CVO, AM, QPM	For service to Australian law enforcement, to victims of crime and to the community	

=== Officers (AO) ===
==== General Division ====
Recipient	Citation	Notes
Emeritus Professor Gordon Leslie Ada	For service to medicine in the field of immunology and international health	
Brian David Anderson	For service to science and to engineering	
Emeritus Professor David Malet Armstrong	For service in the discipline of philosophy	
Dr Peter Francis Bladin	For service to neurology, particularly through epilepsy treatment and research	
Dr Norman Keith Boardman	For service to science and to the CSIRO	
Sir Laurence Charles Brodie-Hall, CMG	For service to mining	
Diana Lynne Browne	For service to children's television production and programming	
The Honourable Sir Robert Carrington Cotton, KCMG	For service to international relations, particularly through the Australian Political Exchange council	
Denis Michael Cullity, CMG	For service to forest industries and to the community	
Brigadier James Osmond Furner, CBE MBE	For service to international relations	
Russell James Fynmore	For service to business, commerce and to the community	
Chief Commissioner Kelvin Glare, APM	For service as Chief Commissioner of the Victorian Police	
Graham Gordon Glenn	For service to the public sector reform and to industrial relations	
Robin Hughes	For service to film making and broadcasting	
The Honourable Christopher John Hurford	For service to the Australian Parliament and to Australian/American cultural and commercial relations	
Emeritus Professor Noel Sydney Hush	For service to science in the field of theoretical chemistry	
Professor Warren Ross Jones	For service to medicine, particularly in the fields of the immunology of human reproduction and fertility	
The Honourable Dr Barry Owen Jones, MP	For service to the promotion of science, the arts and film, writing and Australian politics	
Reginald John Lamble	For service to the insurance industry as chief executive officer of the National Roads and Motorists Association	
Professor Ronald Alfred Leng	For service to agriculture in the area of ruminant nutrition and to improving livestock productivity in developing countries	
The Honourable Dennis Leslie Mahoney	For public service and for service to the law and the community	
Walter Geoffrey Thomas Miller	For public service and for service to international relations	
Professor Graham Frank Mitchell	For service to science in the field of immunoparasitology	
The Right Reverend Phillip Keith Newell	For service to religion as Anglican bishop of Tasmania, to education and to the community	
The Honourable Peter James Nixon	For service to the Australian Parliament and to the community	
Emeritus Professor Ian James Polmear	For service to materials science and to engineering	
Geoffrey Rose	For service to mining and to minerals research	
Robert Salzer	For service to the arts and to the community	
William Ivan Scales	For service to industry, particularly through the Automotive Industry Authority	
Vivian Statham, MBE	For service to the veteran and ex-POW communities, to nursing, to the Red Cross Society and to the community	
Jean Marion Tom	For service to the welfare of women in rural and remote Australia through the Country Women's Association	
The Honourable Dr David Oliver Tonkin	For service to the South Australian Parliament, the Commonwealth Parliamentary Association and to the community	
Milan Vyhnalek, OBE	For service to the dairy industry and to cheese making	
Melvyn Keith Ward	For service to telecommunications	
Dr Donald Gatherer Williams	For service to engineering and to transport	
Barbara Ann Young	For service to upholding the rights of the child through the Save the Children Fund and to voluntary overseas aid work	
Robert Fyfe Zacharin	For service to obstetrics and gynaecology and to the health and welfare of women in developing countries	

==== Military Division ====
Branch	Recipient	Citation	Notes
Navy	Commodore Nicholas David Hunten Hammond	For distinguished service and exceptional performance of duty to the Royal Australian Navy within the Naval Materiel Division and particularly as ANZAC Ship Project Director	
Army	Major General Denis Raymond Luttrell, RFD	For distinguished service to the Australian Army Reserve	
Air Force	Air Vice-Marshal Gary John James Beck	For service to the Royal Australian Air Force as Assistant Chief of the Air Staff – Personnel	

=== Member (AM) ===
==== General Division ====
Recipient	Citation	Notes
Joseph Simon Abraham	For services to the Accounting profession in the corporate and public sectors	
Gary (Angry) Anderson	For service to the community, particularly as a youth advocate	
The Reverend Professor Robert Andrew Anderson	For service to theology, particularly in the field of old testament studies and to Jewish/Christian relations	
Dorothy Rae Anstee	For service to nursing, particularly as Director of Nursing at the Austin Hospital	
Jane Diana Arthur	For service to international relations, particularly through arranging for cranio-facial surgery for Indonesian children	
The Reverend Ivor Bailey	For service to the community, particularly through the Adelaide Central Mission	
Mary Baillieu	For service to the arts and to the State Library of Victoria	
Audray Margaret Banfield	For service to the arts, particularly through the Albury Regional Art Centre	
Commissioner Robert Edward Bath	For service to the community, particularly as the Salvation Army Territorial Commander of the Eastern Australia and PNG territory	
Geoffrey Bretherton Bean	For service to education, particularly as Headmaster of Prince Alfred College and to post-compulsory and non-government education	
John Alfred Bell	For service to pharmacy	
Emeritus Professor Geoffrey Thomas Benness	For service to medicine, particularly in the field of radiology	
George David Blenkinsop	For service to the arts, particularly through the Festival of Perth	
Dr Patricia Anne Brennan	For service to the community, particularly as founding President of the movement for the ordination of women	
Eustace Allan Cameron	For service to the wool industry and to the Tasmanian Rural Industry Training Board	
Dr John McNeil Campbell	For service to medicine, particularly in the field of obstetrics and gynaecology	
Reginald Francis Carter	For service to the law and to the community, particularly through freemasonry	
Aaron Ronald Castan	For service to the law	
Ian Alexander Chisholm	For service to the sugar industry and to occupational health and safety	
Anthony Daniel Clyne	For service to public service	
The Honourable Henry Edward Cosgrove	For service to the law	
Dr John Maurice Court	For service to adolescent health, particularly those with diabetes	
Evelyn Margrett Crawford	For service to Aboriginal education	
Ray Austin Crooke	For service to the arts, particularly as a landscape artist	
Joy Frances Cruickshank	For service to nursing, particularly as Director of Nursing at Sir Charles Gairdner Hospital	
Dr Nerida Margaret Dilworth	For service to medicine, particularly in the field of paediatric anaesthesia	
Edward Joseph Egan	For service to the Aboriginal community and to the interpretation of Australian Cultural Heritage through song and verse	
Associate Professor Donald Westland Emerson	For service to geophysical exploration	
Merrion Frances Fox	For service to children's literature	
Professor Peter Adalbert Fritz	For service to business and commerce	
David Charles Leslie Gibbs	For service to the community and to conservation	
Henry Alfred Gordon, CMG	For service to the community and to the promotion of Australian sport	
Robert Watson Ptolemy Gourley	For service to health, particularly through the National Epilepsy Association of Australia	
Captain Neville Grady	For service to aviation and to navigation	
Malcolm Alexander Gray	For service to the real estate industry and to cricket administration	
Diana Mary Gribble	For service to publishing and to the promotions of Australian literature	
Robert Keith Hamburger	For public service	
William Leslie Hamilton	For service to education	
Dr Michael James Harris	For service to medicine, particularly in the field of paediatrics	
Harry Meares Hearn	For service to the Austin Hospital Medical Research Foundation	
Edna Mary Hopkins	For service to education, particularly through English as a Second Language teaching and to multicultural education	
Margaret Joyce Hubery	For service to nursing and to the community	
Dr Ronald Graham Hunt	For service to the chiropractic profession	
Heather Innes	For service to the community and to aviation	
Timothy Walter James	For service to international relations	
Dr Shirley Winifred Jeffrey	For service to marine science	
Cedric Lindsay Johnson	For service to the community and for public service	
Dr William Henry Kitchen	For service to medicine, particularly in the field of neonatal paediatrics and research	
Dr Leslie Michael Koder	For service to education	
Dr Joan Margaret Lawrence	For service to medicine, particularly in the field of psychiatry	
Sam Lipski	For service to the media, particularly in the fields of current affairs and foreign affairs	
Professor John Miles Little	For service to medicine, particularly in the fields of hepatic and vascular surgery	
Timothy John Macartney-Snape, OAM	For service to mountaineering and to international relations	
Captain Harry Mansson	For service to shipping and to international trade	
Colin Alexander McAlister	For public service, particularly in the field of social policy reform	
Professor William Henry McCarthy	For service to medicine, particularly in the field of melanoma surgery and education	
Gerald Mack McCraith	For service to horticulture, particularly in the field of orchid culture	
John Frederick Miller, CVO, MBE	For public service as Director of Protocol, New South Wales Premier's Department	
John Royden Mitchell	For service to quantity surveying and to the community	
Emma Isobella Morrow	For service to women	
David Mowaljarlai	For service to Aboriginal culture	
Joy Iris Mudge	For service to the Arts, particularly through children's theatre	
Michael Tjakamarra Nelson	For service to art	
Nganyinytja	For service to Aboriginal culture and welfare	
Harold Charles Clarence Phillips	For service to primary industry	
Professor Alan Anthony Leslie Powell	For service to education, particularly in the field of economics	
Bernard Joseph Power	For service to business and commerce, and to the community	
Associate Professor Desmond John Power	For service to education, to deafness studies and to research	
Steven John Rawling	For service to education	
Victor James Renton	For service to lawn bowls	
Dr Euan Maurice Roberts	For service to the wool industry and to education	
Associate Professor Portia Robinson	For service to education, particularly in the field of Australian colonial history	
Kenneth John Robson	For public service, particularly as Auditor General of New South Wales	
Ernest Rodeck	For service to engineering, to management and to the community	
Peter Roland Ross	For service to media, particularly television as an arts presenter	
Professor Derrick Rowley	For service to medicine, particularly in the field of microbiology and immunology research	
Delys Bertha Sargeant	For service to community health	
Dr Michael Anthony Sargent	For service to engineering	
Robert Douglas Scott	For service to the media, particularly radio and film conservation and to the community	
Peter Simon	For service to engineering, particularly in the field of public safety standards and to the community	
Gary Lachlan Simpson	For service to the Arts, particularly in the field of administration and education	
Associate Professor Barry Anthony Smithurst, AM, RFD, ED	For service to road safety and medicine	
Professor Frederick Oscar Stephens	For service to medicine, particularly in the field surgical oncology	
Dr Noel William Stevenson	For service to medicine, particularly in the field of emergency medicine	
Leon Turnbull Sykes	For service to the community and for public service	
Geoffrey Noel Vanthoff	For service to industrial relations and to public sector superannuation schemes	
William Alfred John Vautin	For service to Industry, particularly in the field of packaging and recycling	
Ervin Hugo Vidor	For service to aquaculture and to the community	
Associate Professor Marcus Rex Vowels	For service to medicine, particularly in the fields of childhood leukaemia and cancer	
Paul Joseph Waite	For service to the retailing industry, particularly hardware and to international relations	
Kevin Maurice Waller	For public service as State Coroner, New South Wales	
Professor Anthony John Webber	For service to education and research, particularly in the field of health science	
Ailsa Patricia Whitehead	For service to community and mental health	
Dr Rory Clevedon Willis	For service to medicine, particularly as an ear, nose and throat surgeon	
Roger Brian Winspear	For service to the tourism and hospitality industry	
Professor Paul Zev Zimmet	For service to medicine and education, particularly in the field of diabetes	

==== Military Division ====
Branch	Recipient	Citation	Notes
Navy	Lieutenant Commander Ashley William Greedy	For service to the Royal Australian Navy, particularly as Musical Director of the Victoria Naval Band	
Navy	Commodore George Thomas Polding	For distinguished service and exceptional performance of duty to the Royal Australian Navy and particularly in the area of corporate management as Director General of Naval Corporate Management	
Navy	Commodore Alan Leslie Thompson	For exceptional service to Headquarters Australian Defence Force, particularly in the field of Personnel Policy Development	
Army	Lieutenant Colonel Stephen Henry Ayling	For service to Australian Army as Commanding Officer of 2nd Signal Regiment and the Australian contingent United Nations Transitional Authority in Cambodia	
Army	Lieutenant Colonel Alan Daniel Brimelow	For service to the Australian Army as the Commanding Officer of the 2nd Cavalry Regiment	
Army	Principal Chaplain Peter Rudolph Dillon	For service as Principal Chaplain	
Army	Brigadier Rodney Michael Earle	For service to the Australian Army as Commander of the 6th Brigade and as Staff Officer with Land Headquarters	
Army	Colonel Gordon Warrington Hurford	For service to the Australian army as Commandant 1st Recruit Training Battalion	
Army	Brigadier Desmond Maurice Mueller	For service to the Australian Defence Force as Director General Force Development (Land)	
Air Force	Air Commodore David Thomas Bowden	For service to the Royal Australian Air Force as the Director General Communications and Information Systems	
Air Force	Group Captain John Gordon Gazley	For service to the Royal Australian Air Force as Senior Plans and Policy Staff Officer Air Headquarters	
Air Force	Air Commodore Errol John McCormack	For service to the Royal Australian Air Force as Director General Force Development (Air)	
Air Force	Wing Commander David Bruce Sutherland	For service to the Royal Australian Air Force as Staff Officer Development Planning, Directorate of Air Force Plans	
Air Force	Squadron Leader Anthony Michael Turton	For service to the Royal Australian Air Force as Resident Project Manager Israel for the P-3C Electronic Support Measures Project	
Air Force	Group Captain Christopher Alan Tyler	For service to the Royal Australian Air Force as the inaugural Officer Commanding No 501 Logistics Wing	

=== Medal (OAM) ===
==== General Division ====
Recipient	Citation	Notes
Voncie Irene Aiken	For service to the community as co-founder of Headway Tasmania and support services for people with brain injuries	
Mary Beatrice Sheila Akers	For services to the community	
William Eric Anschutz	For service to business and commerce	
Anson William Austin	For service to the performing arts as an opera singer	
Dr John Percival Spence Bach	For service to maritime history	
Freda Madeline Bailey	For service to the Maitland Hospital Auxiliary and to the United Hospital Auxiliaries of New South Wales	
Shirley Jean Barrett	For service to the community	
Vera Bartley	For service to the United Hospital Auxiliaries, Bathurst Branch	
Douglas George Bathgate	For service to the community and local government	
John Mayston Bechervaise, MBE	For service to Australian Antarctic Exhibition	
Bernard Charles Bedford	For service to the Aboriginal community	
Ronald Jellicoe Bell	For service to the breeding and cultivation of roses	
Alderman Alexander James Douglas Bell	For service to the community and to local government	
Veronica Ailsa Berry	For service to music as an examiner and teacher of piano	
Edward Melville Blackwood	For service to youth as founder of the Narrabeen Youth and Community Centre	
Charles Howard Blyth	For service to the community	
The Reverend Father James Edward Boland	For service to the community as Senior Chaplain, New South Wales Police Service	
Robert Garth Boomer	For service to education, particularly through curriculum development	
Hazel Mildred Bowen	For service to the community through the Country Women's Association	
Leslie Gordon Braithwaite	For service to the community and local government	
Ruby Stella Breen	For service to the community through the Lane Cove Community Aid Service	
Cara Murray Brett Hall	For service to the community, particularly through the Cornucopia Committee	
Mark Gerrard Brinkley	For service to the performing arts as a ballet dancer	
Beris Winifred Broderick	For service to local history	
Clifford Charles Buchanan	For service to nursing	
Alice Joy Barbara Bugge	For service to the performing arts, particularly through the Heidelberg Theatre Company	
Valerie Buswell	For service to women	
Arnold Stanley Byfield	For service to Australian Rules Football	
Pasqualina Caporaso	For service to the community, particularly as State Manager of Austcare South Australia	
Sister Mary Austin Carey	For service to midwifery and hospital administration, Mercy Private Hospital, East Melbourne	
Raymond William Carroll	For service to education, sport and to youth development	
Ronald Keith Castle	For service to the tourism and hospitality industry and to the community	
Harvey William Chapman	For service to children with disabilities	
Colvin Edward Churches	For service to the sport of gliding	
Dr Mervyn David Cobcroft, RFD	For service to the community, and medical and maritime history	
Allan Joseph Collopy	For service to the community and local government	
Coralie Grace Condon	For service to the entertainment industry	
Kenneth Raymond Coombe	For service to the Australian beef cattle industry	
Nell Elizabeth Archer Cooper	For service to the Peter MacCallum Cancer Institute and to the community	
William Thomas Cooper	For service to the community and local government	
Dr Geoffrey James Cornish	For service to medicine, particularly through the development of cardiac rehabilitation programmes and to the community	
Dr Brian Leslie Cornish	For service to medicine as an orthopaedic surgeon	
Major Robert Frederick Cowie	For service to veterans	
Arthur David Cowling	For service to the YMCA and to the Y's Men International movement	
Francis Paul Coyne	For service to people with disabilities	
Olive Dahlenburg	For service to the Royal Children's Hospital and to the Anti-Cancer Council of Victoria	
June Marie Dally-Watkins	For service to business and commerce	
Gweneth Kathleen Davies	For service to women, particularly through the National Council of Women	
Desmond Davis	For service to the performing arts, particularly as founder and Artistic Director of Theatre South in Wollongong	
Kevin Robert Dean	For service to veterans	
Lionel Robert Dennis	For service to the disabled	
Frederick Charles Dobbie	For service to youth through the Australian Air League	
Robert Gibson Francis Dobson	For service to the community	
Thomas Arthur Drysdale	For service to Rugby League football	
Jerzy Jan Dudzinski	For service to the Polish community	
Edna Gladys Dunn	For service to the community and to primary school education	
Charles Howarth Earp	For service to the sport of golf	
Dr Vlasis Pitsonis Efstathis	For service to community health	
Alderman Frederick John Faircloth	For service to the community	
Gweneth Lucy Faulkner	For service to the Canberra Senior Citizens Centre	
Alfred John Fenech	For service to the Maltese community and to the Ethnic Council of New South Wales	
William Edward Fisher	For service to the community	
Kay Caroline Fisher	For service to Lifeline	
John Basil Fitzgerald	For service to the sport of tennis	
Councillor Brian Vincent Fowler	For service to local government	
Raymond James Frawley	For service to the community and to local government	
Keith Lorimer Furze	For service to water conservation and to the community	
Wendy Eleanor Gallagher	For service to education, particularly adult literacy	
Robert Rens Gill	For service to the community	
Dorothy Jean Goldsmith	For service to the community particularly through the Victorian Branch of the Country Women's Association	
Melvon Kenneth Good	For service to veterans and to the community	
Dr Robert Molesworth Goodwin	For service to community health, particularly through the Queensland Division of the National Heart Foundation	
Ronald Charles Gower	For service to youth through the promotion of sport	
Linley Grant	For service to the community	
Guthrie Herbert Gray	For service to the sport of tennis	
Norman Rae Greber	For service to primary industry, particularly macadamia nut propagation	
Nicholas David Green	For service to sport as a gold medallist in the Men's Coxless Fours rowing event at the Olympic Games, Barcelona 1992	
Marjorie Henrietta Hafner	For service to the community, particularly through the Parent Aid Unit at the Mater Children's Hospital	
Mary Margaret Hardman	For service to the community	
William Harrison	For service to music	
Stephen Mark Hawkins	For service to sport as a gold medallist in the Men's Double Sculls rowing event at the Olympic Games, Barcelona	
Lois Loveday Hawley	For service to the community	
William Hayward	For service to education, particularly through the Queensland Association of Independent Schools	
Tove Helms	For service to children, particularly through UNICEF	
Captain William Nelson Henry	For service to marine safety, particularly through the Australian Volunteer Coast Guard Association	
Keith Alexander Hexter	For service to people with physical disabilities	
Sheila Trevor Higgin	For service to the community	
Susan Mary Hodgson	For service to the community as co-founder of Headway, Tasmania, and to improving facilities and support services for people with brain injuries	
James Edward Holliday	For service to veterans	
Ivan Holm	For service to technical and further education and to yachting	
Maxwell David Hooper	For service to the community	
Joan Leonne Horner	For service to netball and to the community	
Sister Margaret Horvath	For service to aged people, to the Hungarian community and to education	
Andrew James Hoy	For service to sport as a gold medallist in the Equestrian Three Day Team event at the Olympic Games, Barcelona 1992	
Edward Michael Jackes	For public service through the Civil Aviation Authority	
Magnus Theodore Jamieson	For service to local government and to the community	
Violet Johnson	For service to the community	
George Harold Johnson	For service to Veterans	
Barbara Rennie Jones	For service to early childhood education	
Yvonne Rosemary Jones	For service to performing arts administration	
Dulcie Kanatopsky	For service to radio broadcasting and to arts administration	
Pieter Kapinga	For service to the Dutch community	
William Murray Kavanagh	For service to the community and to the Country Fire Service	
Mary Lavinia Kearney	For service to charitable organisations	
Peter John Kelly	For service to veterans	
Larry Richard Kent	For service to sport for people with disabilities and to tenpin bowling	
Joseph George Khoury	For service to the Lebanese community	
Val Wilfred Kleem	For service to veterans	
Kurt Kraushofer	For service to sport for people with intellectual disabilities, particularly through the Special Olympics	
Rosalie Lynette Kunoth-Monks	For service to the Aboriginal community	
Lindsay John Charles Lake	For service to the Building Workers' Industrial Union	
Irene Lake	For service to youth, particularly through the Girl Guide Association	
Pat Lamanna	For service to the community, particularly the disadvantaged	
Irene Alice Lancaster	For service to veterans	
Joan Lane	For service to education, particularly for children with special needs	
Douglas Charles Lee	For service to the community and to local government	
Dr Werner Rudolf Linde	For service as a medical volunteer assisting refugees in overseas countries	
Tor Edvin Lindquist	For service to the restoration and conservation of the Barque Polly Woodside	
Edna Lyall Linley	For service to the community, particularly through the Red Cross Society	
William Thompson Long	For service to cycling	
Leonard Hugh Long	For service to the arts as a painter of Australian landscapes	
Lionel Joaquin Paul Long	For service to the performing and visual arts	
Eric Geoffrey Butler Lusk	For service to golf administration	
Albert Edward Lyon, ED	For service to the community, particularly through the State Emergency Service	
Dr Ian Thomas MacBean	For service to town and regional planning and to the environment	
Councillor Austin Joseph Abbott Mack	For service to local government	
The Reverend Christiaan Johannes Pieter Mackaay	For service to religious education	
Elizabeth Fraser Mackay	For service to aged people	
Sheldon Mitchell Maher	For service to veterans	
Harold David Mair	For service to the New South Wales Parliament and to local government	
James Patrick Mallon	For service to lawn bowls	
Joseph Anthony Marlow	For service to people with physical disabilities	
Susan Jean Maroney	For service to marathon swimming	
Vincenzo Jim Martino	For service to the Italian community	
Emra Burkitt Marxsen	For service to veterans	
Laurance Keith Mason, OBE	For service to veterans	
Elizabeth Wilhelmina Mattick	For service to peace and disarmament	
Mabel Christina McAlister	For service to the Embroiderers Guild of Queensland	
Kevin John McCann	For service to sailing	
George Charles McFarlane	For service to agricultural education	
James McGeachie	For service to the Newcastle Show Association and the Showground Trust	
Francis John McGuinness	For service to brass band music	
Stanley McInnes	For service to veterans and their families	
Maisie McKenzie	For service to the community	
The Reverend Joseph McKinney	For service to the Presbyterian Church and to the community	
James Duncan McLaughlin	For service to the Trade Union movement and the community	
Genoveva Diaz Medwell	For service to the welfare of migrants	
Percy Vince Middleton	For service to veterans and to the community	
Hugh Brian Miller	For service to radio for the print handicapped	
Dr Keith Samuel Millingen	For service to neurology	
Keith Edgar Mitchell	For service to cricket administration	
Doris Mabel Mitchell	For service to women and to the Australian Board of Missions	
Patricia Phyllis Montgomerie	For service to the community	
Jean Mavis Moran	For service to the community	
Dr Michael Harry Moreny	For service to the Australian Pony Club Council	
Dennis Morgan	For service to hockey administration	
Elvie Lillian Munday	For service to the Winston Churchill Memorial Trust	
Ian James Murphy	For service to local government and to the community	
Violee Victoria Myers-Davey	For service to the community	
Ronald James Neale	For service to the Queensland Squadron Air Training Corps	
Councillor Philip Stephen Nelson	For service to local government and to the community	
Merle Winsford Newbould	For service to the community	
Tikki Newman	For service to the entertainment industry and to charitable organisations	
John Robert Newman	For service to the entertainment industry and to charitable organisations	
Grace Elizabeth Norris	For service to the community	
Kenneth O'Dea	For service to local government and to the community	
Maxwell Wilkinson Oldmeadow	For service to the community and to education	
Joyce Rosalind Olsen	For service to the community	
Lance Martin Otto	For service to gymnastics and to the community	
Neville Francis Overson	For service to veterans and to the community	
George Humphery Park	For service to local government and to the community	
Mohamed Saleh Parkar	For service to the Indian community	
Barbara Merle Payne	For service to pharmacy through the New South Wales Pharmacy Board, the Pharmaceutical Society of Australia and the Australian Pharmacy Examining Council	
Eileen Evelyn Peach	For service to the community	
Lionel Norman Pearse	For service to local government	
Mervyn John Pearson	For service to the shearing industry	
Patricia Agnes Penrose	For service to veterans and to the community	
Kieren John Perkins	For service to sport as a gold medallist in the 1500 Metres Freestyle swimming event at the Olympic Games, Barcelona	
Erica Mercia Phayre	For service to the community	
Jean Poole	For service to the community	
Frederick Edward Priest	For service to the Trade Union movement	
Dell Purtill	For service to the community	
Ronald Arthur Quint	For service to the Royal Volunteer Coastal Patrol	
Colin Lewis Rattray	For service to local government	
Arthur Robert Read	For service to the community	
Major Francis Walter Reade, ED	For service to veterans and to the community	
John Lawrence Reilly	For service to the community	
Matthew David Rennie	For service to veterans and their families	
Edward Noel Richardson	For service to cricket administration and to school sport	
James Henry Rickard	For service to the community	
Coral Ethel Rizzali	For service to people with disabilities, particularly children	
Clint David Robinson	For service to sport as a gold medallist in the K1 100 Metres canoeing event at the Olympic Games, Barcelona 1992	
Hugh Claude Gregory Rodgers	For service to the mining industry and to veterans	
Gillian Rolton	For service to sport as a gold medallist in the Equestrian Three Day Team Event at the Olympic Games, Barcelona 1992	
James Charles Rooks	For public service as Assistant General Manager and Company Secretary of Aboriginal Hostels Limited	
Reginald Andrew Rose	For service to Australian Rules football administration	
Anita Louise Rosenberg	For service to the Stroke Recovery Association of New South Wales	
Christine Elizabeth Roughley	For service to softball	
Martin Rubinstein	For service to the Arts, particularly ballet	
Dr Valmae Lenore Rundle	For service to Egyptian archaeology and to the community	
Vito Russo	For service to local government and to the community	
Matthew Morgan Ryan	For service to sport as a dual gold medallist in the Equestrian Three Day Individual and Team Events at the Olympic Games, Barcelona 1992	
Kevin Ryan	For service to the community, particularly through providing care and support for the needy and disadvantaged	
Desmond Sendall Sainsbery	For service to youth and to sport in the Warringah Shire	
Elvera Jean Schmaal	For service to local history and to the National Trust	
Dr Robert Peter Schmidt	For service to the community as a general practitioner and to post-graduate medical training	
Ivy Bartz Schultz, MBE	For service to nursing	
Evan Christian Schwarten	For service to the community and to the Australian Labor Party	
Veronica Esma Schwarten	For service to the community and to the Australian Labor Party	
Moira Edna Shannon	For service to the community, particularly through increasing public awareness of domestic violence and child abuse	
Marjorie Hope Sharp	For service to people with schizophrenia and their families	
William Arthur Siddins	For service to the development of the sport of cricket for blind and visually impaired players	
Marie Sim	For service to the Office of the Vice Chancellor, University of Sydney	
Ronald Keith Smith	For service to sailing	
Derek George Frank Smith	For service to conservation and the environment in the Furneaux Group	
Olga Smith	For service to the Mothercraft Society of the Australian Capital Territory and to golf administration	
Adele Southwick	For service to the Jewish community, particularly through the Montefiore Homes	
Elizabeth Margaret Speed	For service to the community, particularly through the Country Women's Association Aged Persons Hostel	
Thomas Daniel Sprod	For service to literature as an author, publisher and distributor of works on Tasmanian history	
Paula Stafford	For service to the fashion industry, particularly as a swimwear designer	
Maida Stern	For service to people with intellectual disabilities, particularly through the Activ Foundation	
Matthew Alfred Clement Stidston	For service to scouting, particularly through the Victorian Scout Archives and Museum	
John Gerard Stokes	For service to the Central Coast community, particularly in the fields of community health and education	
John Joseph Stubbs	For service to the Junior Surf Life Saving Association (Nippers) of Queensland	
Thomas Norman Swindon	For public service, particularly through developing national radiation protection standards and practices	
Dr Leonard James Tierney	For service to social welfare and social work education	
Stanley Ernest Toft	For service to the sugar industry, to lawn bowls administration and to the community	
Edwin Allan Australia Tom	For service to the arts and entertainment industry as the Travelling Picture Show Man	
Marjorie Dawn Townsend	For service to the community	
Ernest George Tremayne	For service to veterans	
Bernard James Trevaskis	For service to junior sport administration, particularly cricket and football	
Gladys Gem Trotter	For service to the community, particularly through the Red Cross Society and the Guide Dogs for the Blind Association of Queensland	
Peggy Irene Tunstall	For service to the Australian Commonwealth Games Association	
Mary Elizabeth Turner	For service to the community of Penrith	
Phyllis Marjorie Unsworth	For service to the community	
Genovaite Vasiliauskas-Vaskas	For service to the Lithuanian community	
Margaret Mary Vern-Barnett, MBE	For service to the Autistic Children's Association of New South Wales	
Roy Edward Vizard	For service to the community	
Keith David Wallis	For service to Australian Rules football administration and coaching	
Francis Patrick Ward	For service to the community, particularly through the Society of St Vincent de Paul	
Elaine Watson	For service to women's soccer	
Kathryn Anne Watt	For service to sport as a gold medallist in the cycling individual road race event at the Olympic Games, Barcelona, 1992	
Montague Thomas Archibald Wedd	For service to the community as a historian, writer and illustrator	
First Class Constable Kevin David Wells	For service to youth, particularly through the Police Citizens Youth Club	
Ivy Patience Weston	For service to netball	
John Peter White	For service to people with physical disabilities, particularly through the Disabled Motorists Association	
Howard Brefteau Whittaker	For service to local history and to the community	
Nita Whyte	For service to the community through music	
William Stanley Wickham	For service to the community and to the Multiple Sclerosis Society of South Australia and the Northern Territory	
Margaret Louise Wilkins	For service to the community, particularly through the Leo and Jenny Leukaemia and Cancer Foundation	
Peter Marshall Wilkinson	For service to veterans as honorary solicitor for the Returned and Services League, New South Wales Branch	
Brenda Williams	For service to the Naval Association of Australia	
Ronald Lewis Wills, VRD	For service to the music recording industry	
Ernest Robert Wolfe	For service to local government and to the community	
Martin John Wright	For service to local government and to the community	
Robert William Wylde	For service to the community	
Richard Gabriel York	For service to the Mallacoota Ambulance Service and to the community	
David Young	For service to urban horticulture, particularly as a garden adviser on ABC Radio 2CN	
Gladys Irene Kennan Young	For service to the community and to youth	

==== Military Division ====
Branch	Recipient	Citation	Notes
Navy	Warrant Officer Edmund Henry Baumgarten	For service as the Deputy Marine Engineer Officer, HMAS Darwin	
Navy	Warrant Officer Stephen Frank Drake	For service to the Royal Australian Navy, particularly in the field of Electronic warfare	
Navy	Chief Petty Officer Ronald Richard Giveen	For exceptional service to the Royal Australian Navy, particularly in the field of personnel services	
Army	Warrant Officer Class Two Kenneth John Beutel	For service to the Australian Army as the Caterer of the Brisbane Logistic Group and Bulimba Barracks	
Army	Warrant Officer Class One Ian John Haycock	For service to the Australian Army as Regimental Major of the 7th Signal Regiment	
Army	Warrant Officer Class Two Colin Robert Holbeck	For service to the Australian Army Reserve in the field of training	
Army	Sergeant Inger Steven Lawes	For service to the Australian Army in the field of training	
Army	Warrant Officer Class Two Rodney Lowther Lees	For service to the Australian Army Reserve as Officer Commanding Mortar Platoon, 41st Battalion, the Royal New South Wales Regiment	
Army	Warrant Officer Class One Michael John Ryan	For service to the Australian Army Reserve as Squadron Sergeant Major 13th Field Squadron	
Army	Warrant Officer Class One William Tasman Ward	For service to the Australian Army as the Quartermaster of 51st Battalion the Far North Queensland Regiment	
Army	Warrant Officer Class Two Phillip John Way	For service to the Australian Army during the introduction into service of the Raven family of radio equipment	
Army	Staff Sergeant Robert Arthur Wilson	For service to the Australian Army as the Company Quartermaster Sergeant, Support Company 1st/19th Battalion, the Royal New South Wales Regiment	
Army	Warrant Officer Class Two Robert Zelesco	For service to the Australian Army as Artificer Sergeant Major, School of Artillery	
Air Force	Warrant Officer Peter James Maughan Fleming	For service to the Royal Australian Air Force as Warrant Officer Engineer No 38 Squadron	
Air Force	Warrant Officer James Keith Melrose	For service to the Royal Australian Air Force as senior Non-Commissioned Officer in charge of Communications Section Base Squadron Pearce	
Air Force	Warrant Officer Paul Raymond Watson	For service to the Royal Australian Air Force as the Air Force’s Senior Laboratory Technician	
