= Henry Jerrim =

Australian Anglican clergyman

The Right Reverend Henry Jerrim OBE ED
- Assistant Bishop, Anglican Diocese of Tasmania
- Church: Anglican Church of Australia
- Diocese: Tasmania
- In office: 21 December 1974–1985

Orders
- Consecration: 21 December 1974 by Sir Frank Woods

Personal details
- Born: 21 March 1916 North Hobart, Australia
- Died: 22 May 2009 (aged 93) Hobart, Australia
- Denomination: Anglican
- Spouse: Prue

Henry Allingham Jerrim OBE ED (21 March 1916 – 22 May 2009) was an Australian bishop in the Anglican Church of Australia. He served as an assistant bishop in the Anglican Diocese of Tasmania from 1974 to 1985.

Jerrim was born, raised and educated in Hobart, attending Holy Trinity church in North Hobart, where he was also appointed curate as his first ministry position. He spent a short time as priest-in-charge at Smithton then spent two years as an army chaplain with the Second Australian Imperial Force. After World War 2, Jerrim served as priest at Cullenswood, Cygnet, Devonport, Sandy Bay and St. John's Launceston, where he was collated as Archdeacon of Launceston.

In 1970, Jerrim was collated Archdeacon of Hobart and appointed Rector of West Hobart, but in 1974 was invited by Bishop of Tasmania Robert Davies to become an assistant bishop in the diocese to assist the Bishop of Tasmania with his duties. He was consecrated bishop on 21 December 1974 by Archbishop of Melbourne Sir Frank Woods.

Jerrim served assistant bishop and Vicar-General for ten years until 1985 when he retired. This included a role as Bishop Administrator of the Diocese during the lengthy vacancy from June 1981 and August 1982 between the retirement of Bishop Davies and the enthronement of Bishop Philip Newell (after the unexpected death of Vernon Cornish prior to his enthronement). He chaired the Diocese's Social Welfare Committee, and was the motivation behind the establishment of Anglicare Tasmania in 1983.

Jerrim was appointed an Officer of the Order of the British Empire on 31 December 1983, in the 1984 New Year Honours, for "services to religion and the community".

Jerrim was married to Prue until her death in 2002.
