= St Mark's Church, Kennington =

Coordinates: 51°28′53″N 0°6′43″W

St Mark's, Kennington
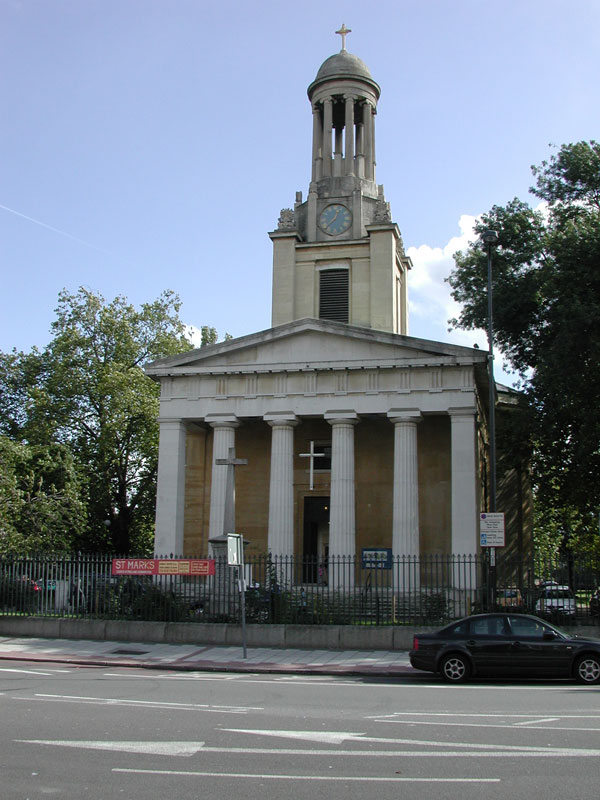
- St Mark's Church, Kennington
- St Mark's, Kennington
- OS grid reference: TQ 31206 77520
- Location: 337 Kennington Park Road, Kennington, London SE11 4PW
- Country: England
- Denomination: Church of England
- Website: http://stmarkskennington.org

History
- Founded: 1824; 202 years ago

Architecture
- Architect(s): David Roper and A. B. Clayton
- Years built: 1824

Administration
- Diocese: Southwark
- Parish: Kennington

St Mark's Church, Kennington, is an Anglican church on Kennington Park Road in Kennington, London, United Kingdom, near Oval tube station. The church is a Commissioners' church, receiving a grant from the Church Building Commission towards its cost. Authorised by the Church Building Act 1824 (5 Geo 4 Cap CIII), it was built on the site of the old gallows corner on Kennington Common.

The architect was David R. Roper, possibly with A.B. Clayton, and was opened in 1824. The total cost of the church, including the land and other expenses, was £22,720. This was paid partly by the local parishioners and partly by Parliament through a grant known as "The Million Fund".

== Clergy ==
The first incumbent was William Otter (1824–1832), subsequently Bishop of Chichester. His son, William Bruère Otter, subsequently Archdeacon of Lewes, was another early Stipendiary Curate.

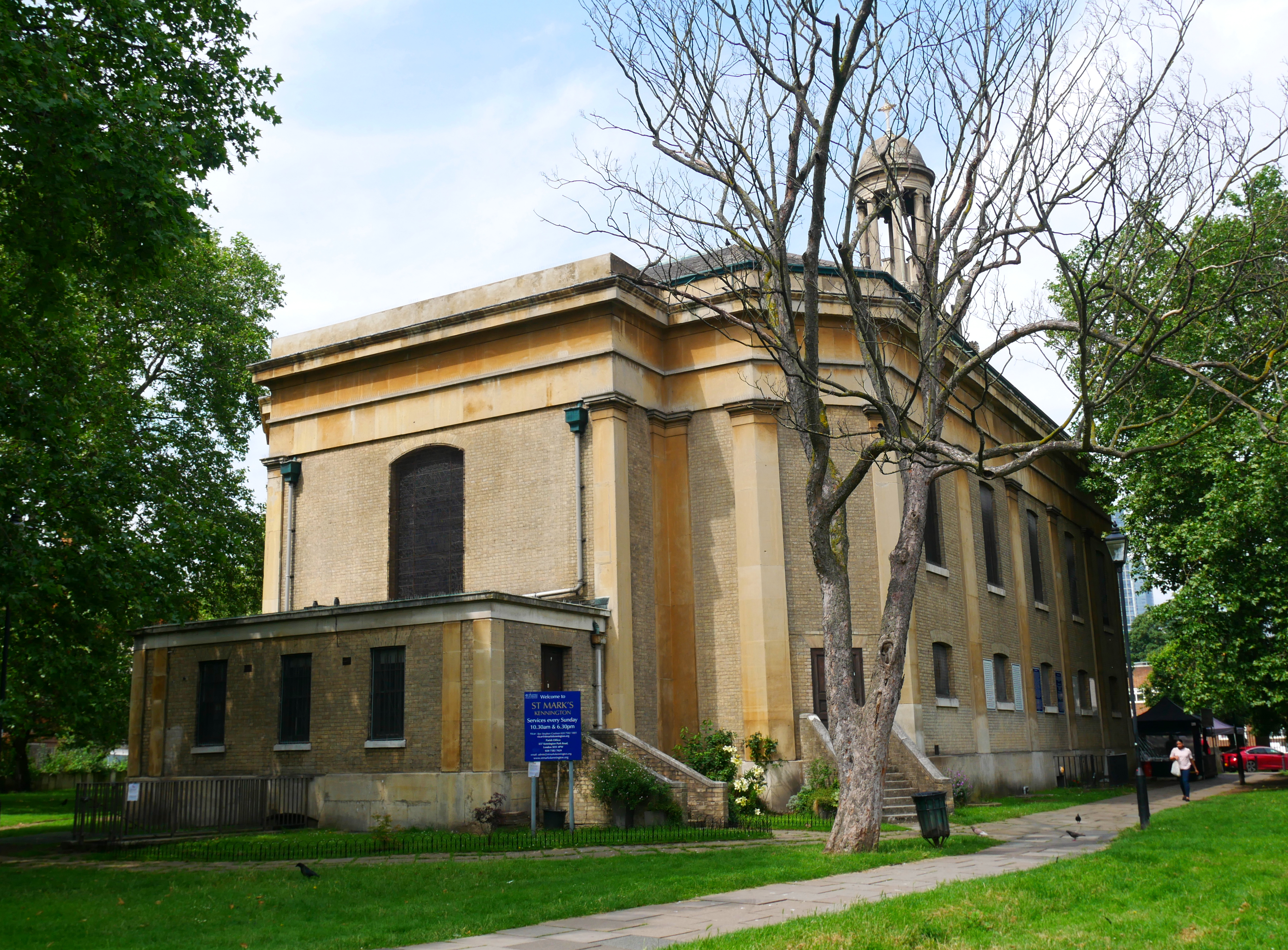
A view of the church from the northeast

He was followed by the Rev Charlton Lane (1832–1865), whose son, also the Rev Charlton Lane, would go on to play cricket for Oxford University and Surrey.

1865–1869: The Rev Henry Robert Lloyd.

1869–1879: The Ven Edmund Henry Fisher. Fisher was also Chaplain to Archibald Tait, successively Bishop of London and Archbishop of Canterbury. He died in 1879.

1879–1889: The Rev Henry Montgomery. Montgomery was a clergyman who had been born into an Ulster Scots family in Cawnpore. He later served as Bishop of Tasmania. His son, who was born in Kennington, was Field Marshal The 1st Viscount Montgomery of Alamein.

1889–1897: The Rev Arthur Gerald Bowman.

1897–1947: For 50 years, including WWII, the Vicar was the top-hatted the Rev John Darlington DD, brother-in-law of Bishop Montgomery. Darlington drove a 1904 James & Browne, which has participated in many London to Brighton Car Runs.

1947–1963: The Rev Canon Harold Wallace Bird, who rebuilt the Church after wartime damage. Bird was ordained in Lahore, British India, and was then Chaplain St. Andrew's Church, Lahore 1922–1925; worked for SPG in the Diocese of York 1925–1927; and was then in Australia from 1927.

1964–1971: The Rev Colin John Fraser Scott. Scott was subsequently Bishop of Hulme, 1984–1998.

1972–1989: The Rev Canon Sir Thomas Nicholas Rivett-Carnac, the 8th Baronet Rivett-Carnac.

1990–1998: The Rev John Michael Starr.

1999–2008: The Rev Robert Delatour de Berry. For many years de Berry was a director of the Barnabas Fund, which is a charity that supports persecuted Christians.

2009–2011: The Rev Michael Stuart Starkey.

2012–2025: The Rev Canon Stephen Coulson. Previously Vicar, St Mark's Mitcham.

== Building ==
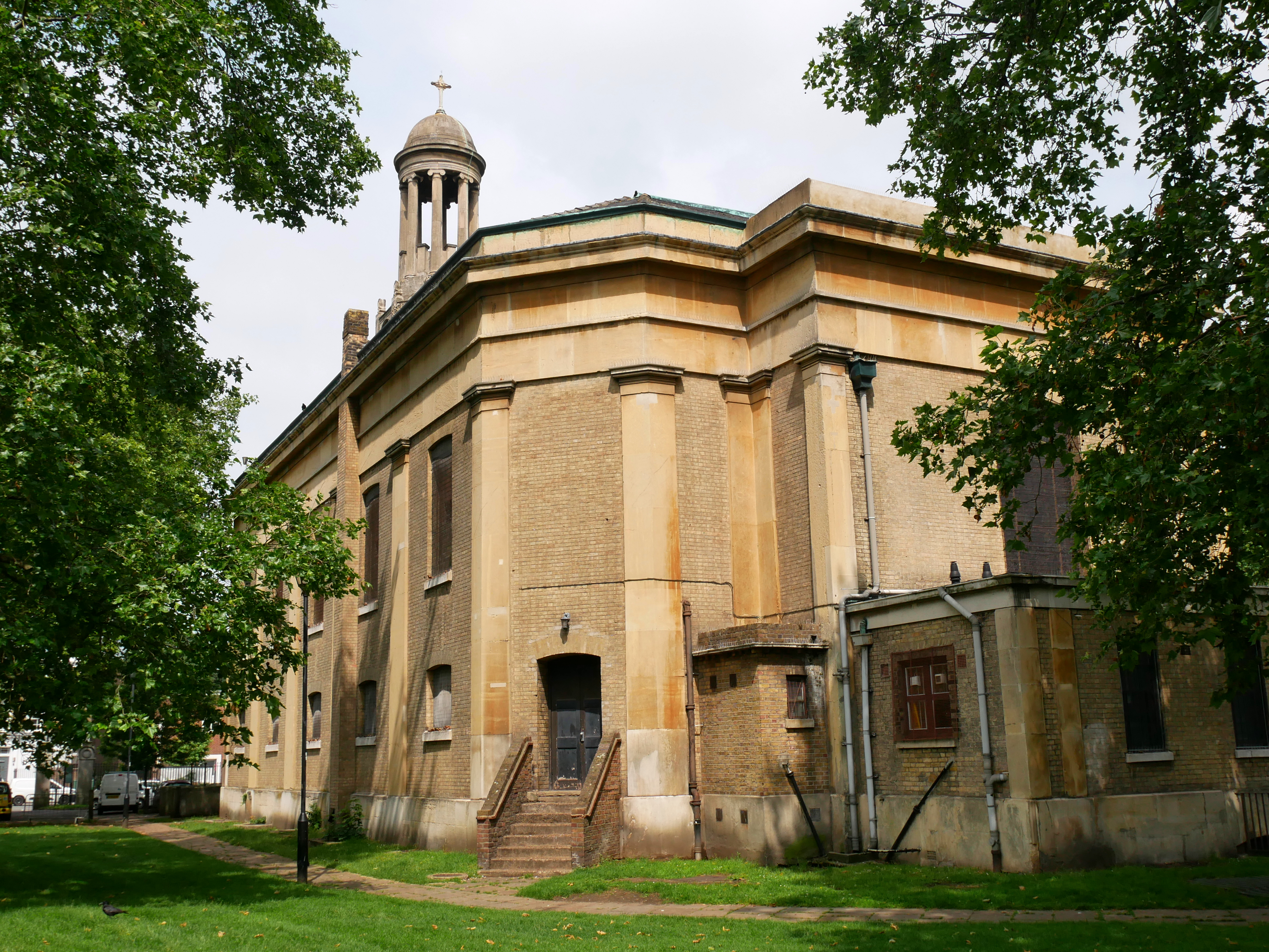
A view of the church from the southeast

Badly bombed during WWII, the church was restored through the efforts of the post-war Vicar, the Rev Wallace Bird, and reopened in 1949. The church is listed Grade II* on the National Heritage List for England and its walls and gate piers are listed Grade II. The WWI War Memorial is also separately listed Grade II.

The organ is a 28 stop Noel Mander, installed in 1949, and originally located in the former St Andrew's, New Kent Road.

On Saturdays a farmers' market is held in the churchyard. The first market took place in 2007.

== See also ==
- List of Commissioners' churches in London
- St. George's Episcopal Memorial Church, a church in the US with a stained glass window containing shards of glass collected from this church when it was damaged in World War II.
