= Henry Montgomery (bishop) =

Anglican bishop and author (1847–1932)

- Bishop of Tasmania
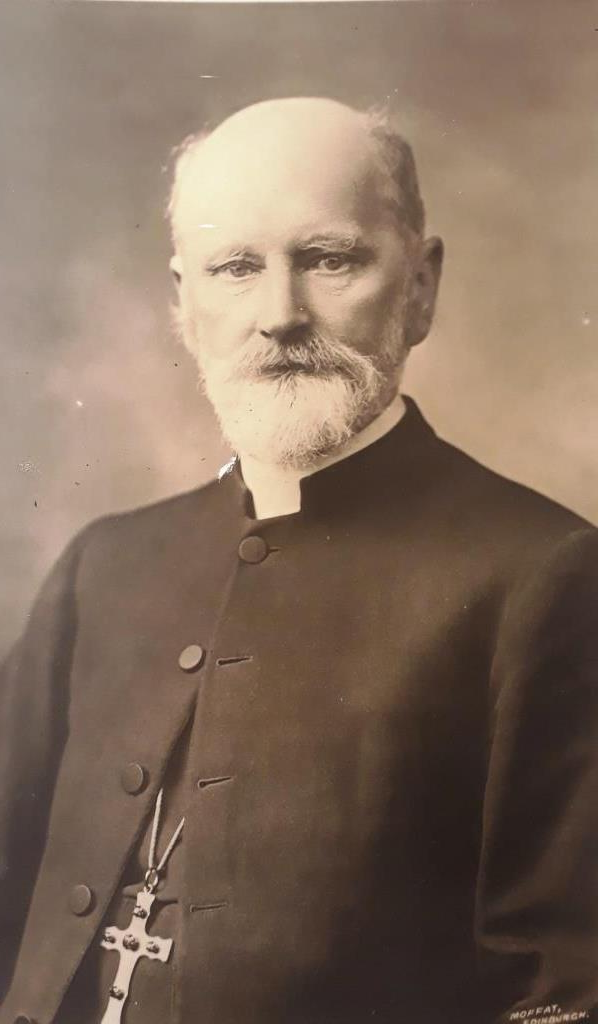
- 1889 photograph of Montgomery as bishop
- Diocese: Anglican Diocese of Tasmania
- In office: 1889–1901
- Predecessor: Daniel Sandford
- Successor: Edward Mercer

Orders
- Ordination: 1871 (deacon); 1872 (priest) by Richard Durnford
- Consecration: 1 May 1889 by Edward White Benson

Personal details
- Born: 3 October 1847 Cawnpore, North-Western Provinces, India
- Died: 25 November 1932 (aged 85) Moville, County Donegal, Ulster, Ireland
- Denomination: Anglican
- Parents: Sir Robert Montgomery
- Spouse: Maud Farrar
- Children: five, including Bernard "Monty"
- Education: Trinity College, Cambridge

Henry Hutchinson Montgomery (3 October 1847 – 25 November 1932) was an Anglican bishop and author. He was appointed Bishop of Tasmania in 1889, and was the father of Bernard "Monty" Montgomery, later 1st Viscount Montgomery of Alamein.

== Early life and education ==
Henry Hutchinson Montgomery was born on 3 October 1847 at Cawnpore, India, the second son of the colonial administrator Robert Montgomery, a future Lieutenant Governor of the Punjab. The Montgomerys were an Ulster-Scots gentry family from County Donegal in Ulster.

He was educated at Harrow School and Trinity College, Cambridge. G. M. Trevelyan claimed that Montgomery was one of the few people ever to have jumped up the college steps in one bound.

== Career ==
Montgomery was made a deacon on Trinity Sunday 1871 (4 June) and ordained a priest the following Trinity Sunday (26 May 1872) — both times by Richard Durnford, Bishop of Chichester, at Chichester Cathedral; Montgomery took curacies at Hurstpierpoint and St. Margaret's, Westminster. On 21 July 1879, he became Vicar of St Mark's Kennington.

He was consecrated a bishop at Westminster Abbey on 1 May 1889 by Edward White Benson, Archbishop of Canterbury, and was then appointed to be Bishop of Tasmania. He was interested in remote Aboriginal communities, and visited Cape Barren Island in the Bass Strait 10 times. The church was active on the island, and for some years co-managed the Aboriginal reserve with the Tasmanian Government until 1901.

After 12 years, he resigned the See, effective 7 November 1901.

In 1901 he was recalled to Britain to be secretary of the Society for the Propagation of the Gospel in Foreign Parts (SPG). Arthur Winnington-Ingram, Bishop of London, appointed him to the prebendal stall of Wenlocksbarn in St Paul's Cathedral in October 1902. Appointments to the prebendal stalls of St Paul's gave voting rights in the Great Chapter of the church and carried an income, but was otherwise an honorary position.

== Honours ==
In 1905 he was appointed Prelate of the Order of St Michael and St George; and was raised to the rank of Knight Commander (KCMG) in the 1928 King's Birthday Honours.

== Personal life and death ==
The Archdeacon at Westminster was Frederic William Farrar. Montgomery became engaged to Farrar's daughter Maud when she was 14 and they married two years later, at Westminster Abbey on 28 July 1881.

In 1887 he inherited New Park, his father's country house and estate, at Moville in Inishowen, County Donegal. Described in his Times obituary as a man "always young in enthusiasm and open vision", he died at home on 25 November 1932 and was buried in Moville churchyard.

His third son (of five) was Bernard "Monty", who became a field marshal and later 1st Viscount Montgomery of Alamein.

Other descendants include Canadian author Charles Montgomery, who wrote a 2004 travel memoir in the steps of his great-grandfather, The Last Heathen: Encounters with Ghosts and Ancestors in Melanesia.

== Works ==
- Mankind and the Church: Being an Attempt to Estimate the Contribution of Great Races to the Fulness of the Church of God, 1907
- Life's Journey, 1916
- Life of Bishop Lefroy, 1920
- Project Canterbury, Charles John Corfe, Naval Chaplain - Bishop, 1927
- Joy of the Lord, 1931
- Old Age, 1932

== Notes ==
Anglican Communion titles
Preceded by Daniel Sandford	Bishop of Tasmania; 1889–1901	Succeeded by Edward Mercer
