= Henry Lucas =

Henry Lucas is the name of:

- Henry Lucas (baseball) (1857–1910), American baseball executive and owner of the St. Louis Maroons
- Henry Lucas (politician) (c. 1610–1663), English MP, philanthropist and benefactor to Cambridge University
- Henry Lucas, British car enthusiast, associated with James and Browne automobiles
- Henry Lee Lucas (1936–2001), American convicted serial killer

== See also ==
- Lucas (surname)
- Lucas (disambiguation)
