= England Athletics =

- Sport: Athletics
- Jurisdiction: England
- Founded: 2005
- Affiliation: UK Athletics
- Headquarters: Athletics House, Alexander Stadium
- Location: Birmingham, England
- Chairperson: Gary Shaughnessy
- CEO: Chris Jones

Official website
- www.englandathletics.org

England Athletics is the governing body for the sport of athletics in England. It was set up as a limited company in 2005, taking over the role of the Amateur Athletic Association of England. England Athletics works closely with UK Athletics, the national governing body for the sport in the United Kingdom.

After a review of athletics in the United Kingdom by Sir Andrew Foster, Sport England demanded radical changes to the governing structure. England Athletics was set up to take responsibility for regional development, whilst its parent organisation, UK Athletics was to maintain oversight of elite performance. Peter Radcliffe, the father of the athlete Paula Radcliffe, was appointed as the chair of England Athletics 2005, the interim organisation set up to establish England Athletics.

Although England Athletics took over the role of the Amateur Athletic Association of England (formerly the AAA) it has maintained that Association as a vehicle for the development of young athletes and the AAA has also taken on the role of safeguarding the history of the sport and still awards trophies to elite athletes.

England Athletics currently has more than 1,800 affiliated clubs and organisations (covering track and field, road running, fell, hill, trail and cross country clubs), 187,000 registered athletes, 30,000 licensed coaches and leaders and 5,200 officials.

England Athletics also runs an annual induction to its Hall of Fame.

== See also ==
- UK Athletics - the parent organisation
- Amateur Athletic Association of England - the predecessor organisation, now absorbed into England Athletics
