= Christopher Jones (Anglican bishop) =

Australian bishop

The Right Reverend Christopher Jones
- Assistant Bishop; Diocese of Tasmania
- Church: Anglican Church of Australia
- Diocese: Tasmania
- Installed: 26 February 2008

Orders
- Consecration: 26 February 2008 by John Harrower

Personal details
- Born: 1964 (age 61–62)
- Denomination: Anglican

Christopher Randall Jones (born 1964) is an Australian bishop in the Anglican Church of Australia. He has served as an assistant bishop and vicar-general in the Anglican Diocese of Tasmania since February 2008. He has also been the CEO of Anglicare Tasmania since 1988.

Jones has held a number of positions in the diocese since 1992, including parish ministry at Kingston, Burnie, Scottsdale and Dorset, before holding positions in the diocese as an archdeacon from 2005 to 2008 and then assistant bishop since 2008. Jones was consecrated bishop on 26 February 2008, along with fellow bishop Ross Nicholson, as part of a new focus on ministry and mission in the diocese.
