= Cranswick =

Cranswick may refer to:

== People ==
- Geoffrey Cranswick (1894–1978), Australian bishop
- George Cranswick (1882–1954), Australian bishop
- James Cranswick Tory (1862–1934), Canadian businessman and politician

== Other ==
- Cranswick plc, British food producer
- Hutton Cranswick, civil parish in Yorkshire, England containing the former village of Cranswick
