= Bishop of Tasmania =

Bishop of Tasmania may refer to:

- Anglican Bishop of Tasmania
- Archbishop of the Roman Catholic Archdiocese of Hobart
