= Reginald Stephen =

Australian Anglican bishop

Reginald Stephen (9 December 1860 - 7 July 1956) was the Anglican Bishop of Tasmania from 1914 until 1919 and then the Bishop of Newcastle (New South Wales) from 1919 until his retirement in 1928.

Stephen was educated at Geelong Church of England Grammar School and entered Trinity College, at the University of Melbourne in 1878. He was ordained deacon in 1883 and priest in 1884 and was a curate and parish priest in Melbourne before becoming chaplain of Trinity College and then the warden of St John's Theological College, Melbourne (1906-1914). From 1894 to 1899, Stephen was vicar at St Andrew's Church, Brighton and was Dean of Melbourne from 1910 until his elevation to the episcopate.

He retired to Melbourne in 1928, where he died on 7 July 1956 at Kew, aged 95. His funeral service was conducted by Archbishop Booth at St Paul's Cathedral on 9 July.

Anglican Communion titles
| Preceded by Edward Mercer | Bishop of Tasmania; 1914–1919 | Succeeded by Robert Hay |
| Preceded by Jack Stretch | Bishop of Newcastle (Australia); 1919–1928 | Succeeded by George Long |
