= Anglican Diocese of Tasmania =

Diocese of the Anglican Church of Australia

Coordinates: 42.833°S 147.327°E

Diocese of Tasmania
- Coat of arms

Location
- Country: Australia
- Territory: Tasmania
- Ecclesiastical province: Extra-provincial
- Headquarters: Level 1; 125 Macquarie Street; Hobart TAS 7000

Statistics
- Population: Total: 103,839
- Parishes: 51
- Churches: 156

Information
- Denomination: Anglican
- Rite: Book of Common Prayer; An Australian Prayer Book; A Prayer Book for Australia
- Established: 21 August 1842
- Cathedral: St David's Cathedral, Hobart

Current leadership
- Parent church: Anglican Church of Australia
- Bishop: Richard Condie; (since 2016)
- Assistant bishop: Christopher Jones; (since 2008)
- Dean: Richard Humphrey; (since 2009)

Website
- anglicantas.org.au
- Anglican Diocese of Tasmania
- Logo of the Diocese

The Anglican Diocese of Tasmania includes the entire Tasmanian state of Australia and is an extraprovincial diocese of the Anglican Church of Australia.

The cathedral church of the diocese is St David's Cathedral in Hobart. The twelfth Bishop of Tasmania, ordained as bishop and installed on 19 March 2016, is Richard Condie.

== Churchmanship ==
Tasmania is a low church/evangelical diocese. In contrast to the Diocese of Sydney's long heritage of evangelicalism or Brisbane or Ballarat's unwavering liberal Anglo-Catholicism, Tasmania's churchmanship has varied over time but it has now returned to its evangelical roots.

In its earliest days, the diocese had a decidedly low church outlook, with priests such as Richard Deodatus Poulett Harris condemning "popery".

During the 1940s, high churchmen had the "experience of being a ‘Lone Scout type Catholic’ in conservative evangelical Tasmania. One of those who attended the occasional meetings of the Tasmanian state branch of the Australian Church Union in the 1940s recalled the conspiratorial atmosphere: 'they were quite delicious really, because everyone was called Father, and we could say the Hail Mary without anyone getting into trouble’".

Since the 1980s, the Diocese has reverted to a strongly evangelical orientation. The last two bishops, John Harrower and Richard Condie, have both supported this stance. Most of the current clergy in the Diocese are trained at the evangelical Ridley College.

Bishop Condie is also the Chairman of the Fellowship of Confessing Anglicans and a member of GAFCON.

== History ==
Robert Knopwood, a member of the original settlement in 1803, was responsible for the initial establishment of Anglicanism in the colony. Also important for the development of Anglicanism in the colony was the arrival of the Bible Society in 1819. Although most of the mainline denominations were well represented in Tasmania, Anglicanism was well established by the 1830s.

Church control of the educational system was a contested issue of the 1840s, with a division between Evangelicals and Anglo-Catholics. On 21 August 1842, Tasmania became the first independent Anglican diocese in Australia by Letters Patent under the Great Seal of Queen Victoria and Francis Nixon was appointed first Bishop of Tasmania. In 1842 (shortly after her erections), her jurisdiction was described as "Van Diemen's Land" (but not "Norfolk Island"). Nixon initiated the creation of a synodical structure in 1858, combining clergy and laity governance of the diocese, mirroring similar measures in the dioceses of Adelaide and Melbourne. In 1866, there were two archdeaconries: Rowland Robert Davies was Archdeacon of Hobart Town and Thomas Reibey of Launceston.

In 1977, the diocese held a youth synod "to encourage informed discussion on religious and social issues", which eventually became the National Anglican Youth Gathering.

== Schools ==
There are three schools associated with the diocese: Hutchins School, Launceston Church Grammar School and St Michael's Collegiate School.

== Welfare and social justice ==
The diocese has various charitable organisations such as the welfare provider Anglicare and the Mission to Seafarers.

There is a strong Christian pacifist subculture in the diocese. In 2012, a priest of the diocese, the Reverend Nathanael Reuss, was elected global chairman of the Anglican Pacifist Fellowship.

== Issues ==
Although General Synod passed legislation to authorise the ordination of women to the priesthood in 1992, Tasmania had already given a deaconess, Marie Kingston, individual responsibility for the parish of King Island during the 1960s.

From 1997 to 1998, a public inquiry was held which unearthed a number of cases of clerical child abuse, involving nine priests, which had occurred from 25 to 30 years previously. As a result of these findings, the diocese provided compensation. More recently the diocese has focused on providing safe ministry with the bishop, John Harrower, saying during his episcopate that "the church is committed to stamping out child sexual abuse within its ranks". He also lobbied the federal government about this issue.

The diocese was called before the Royal Commission into Institutional Responses to Child Sexual Abuse in November 2014, and again in January/February 2016, when the Commission held public hearings into the Church of England Boys' Society (CEBS), a children's group run by the church.

In February 2024, Justice Michael Brett of the Supreme Court of Tasmania ordered the diocese to pay almost A$2.4 million in damages to a 53 year old man, who had been abused by paedophile priest Louis Victor Daniels on multiple occasions. The abuse had taken place in the 1980s, while Daniels was holding a leadership position with the CEBS in Tasmania. In delivering the Court's judgment, Justice Brett also said that he was "... satisfied that the impact on [the victim had] also been compounded to a significant extent by the response of [the then] Bishop Newell and the Church generally to [the victim's] disclosures of abuse, both at the time of the disclosures and over the years since."

Responding to the Court's judgment, the current Bishop, Richard Condie, said, "We're so sad that people who have sat in my position before me have not been able to follow through in the appropriate way with people who came forward with abuse. Things are very different now."

== Demography ==
A report from the General Synod, using National Church Life Survey and Australian Bureau of Statistics data, found that average weekly attendance across the state in 2001 was 4,800. This is from the high-water mark in 1961, when 45.42% of the population declared themselves affiliated with the Anglican Church in Tasmania, the highest percentage of all the Australian states.

In the diocese there are 107 active clergy and 51 parishes.

== Assistant bishops ==
These men have served as assistant bishops (some of whom were styled "missioner bishops") in the diocese:

- William Rothwell Barrett (previously Warden of St Wilfrid's Theological College, Cressy 1924-29 and then Warden of Christ College (University of Tasmania) thereafter), consecrated 21 December 1955
- Henry Allingham Jerrim, consecrated 21 December 1974
- Mervyn Richard Stanton, consecrated 21 December 1985
- Christopher Randall Jones, Assistant Bishop (Vicar-General) (2008–present)
- Ross John Nicholson, Assistant Bishop (Mission) (2008–2017)

== See also ==
- Anglican Diocese of Sydney
- Anglican Diocese of North West Australia
- Anglican Diocese of Armidale
- Anglican Pacifist Fellowship
- Church Missionary Society
- The Mission to Seafarers
- Anglicare
- Ridley Theological College
- Evangelical Anglicanism
- Low church
- Fellowship of Confessing Anglicans
- GAFCON
