= Donald Friell McLeod =

British civil servant (1810–1872)

Sir Donald Friell McLeod KCSI CB
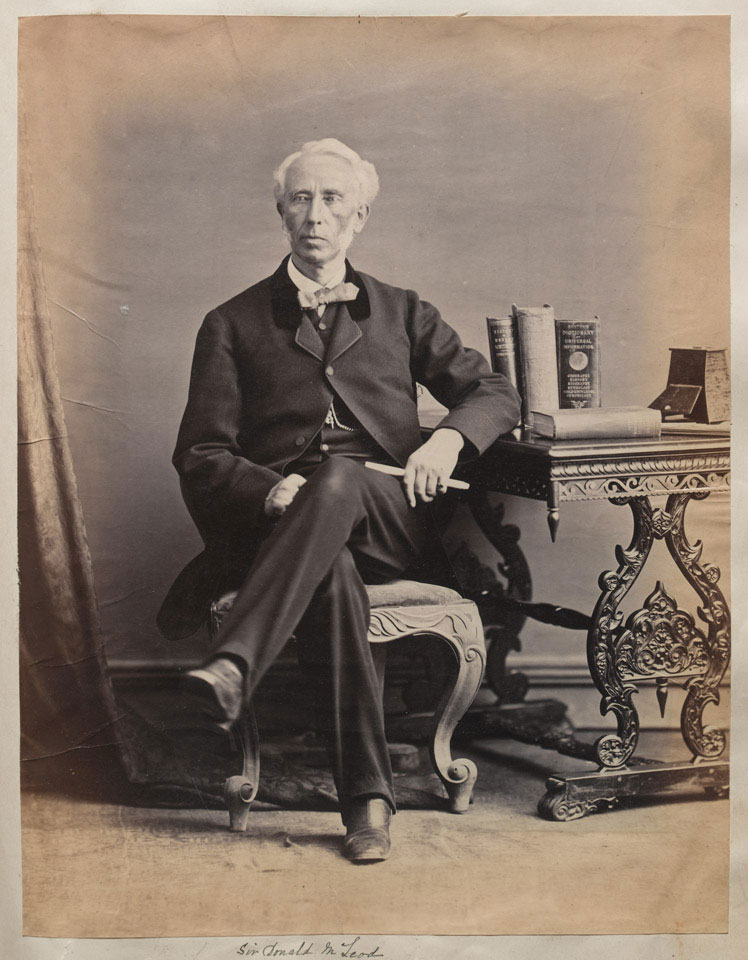
- Sir Donald Friell McLeod, From a photograph album previously owned by General Sir Sam Browne VC, 1857-1870.

Lieutenant Governor of Punjab
- In office 10 January 1865 – 1 June 1870
- Governors General: Sir John Lawrence, Bt; The Earl of Mayo
- Preceded by: Sir Robert Montgomery
- Succeeded by: Sir Henry Marion Durand

Personal details
- Born: 6 May 1810 Fort William, Calcutta, Bengal Presidency, British India
- Died: 28 November 1872 (aged 62) London, England, United Kingdom
- Resting place: Kensal Green Cemetery
- Education: East India Company College

Sir Donald Friell McLeod KCSI CB (6 May 1810 – 28 November 1872) was British civil servant in India who served as Lieutenant Governor of the Punjab between 1865 and 1870. He was one of the founders of Lahore Oriental College, now part of the Punjab University, and is generally remembered as a philanthropic administrator and promoter of education, of both Oriental studies by Europeans, and European literature studies in India.

== Early life ==
He was born at Fort William, Calcutta, then part of the Bengal Presidency. His father was Duncan McLeod (1780–1856), a Scotsman who later became lieutenant general of the Bengal engineers, and achieved distinction designing the Hazarduari Palace. His mother was Henrietta Friell, who descended maternally from the Boileau of Castelnau family.

In 1814 McLeod was sent to stay with his grandfather in Scotland. He was educated at schools in Edinburgh, Dulwich and later Putney where Charles Canning was also a student. In 1826 he was enrolled at East India Company College in Hertfordshire, where he became a friend of John Lawrence.

== Career ==
=== Early career ===
McLeod travelled to Bengal on 10 December 1828 to begin his career in the East India Company's administrative service. He was initially stationed at Munger Fort and in 1831 assisted Colonel William Sleeman on special service suppressing Thuggee. Later that year he was posted to Sagar and Nerbudda as administrator, remaining in the role until 1840 when he assumed special charge of Jubbalpore district. In 1843, McLeod was appointed collector and magistrate for Benares. In Autumn 1845 he became seriously ill, and took leave in Cape Town where he stayed with his sister and brother-in-law until his return in April 1847. During his six-year tenure in Benares, he was regarded for having made significant improvements to the municipal administration and police, and greatly reducing crime in the city.

=== Punjab ===
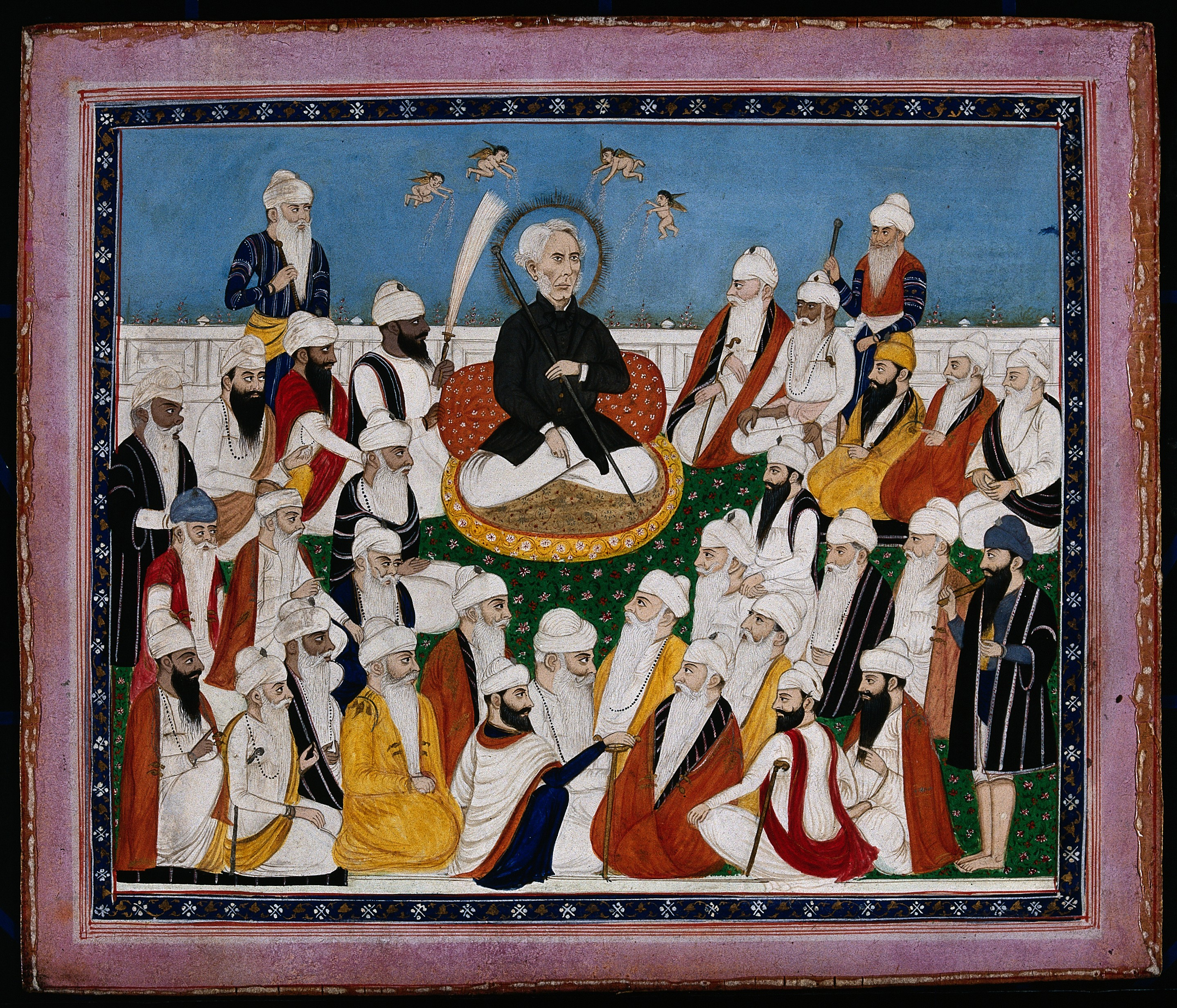
Sir Donald Friell Mcleod surrounded by admiring Sikh elders

McLeod succeeded John Lawrence as commissioner of Jullundur division in 1849, then part of the Cis-Sutlej states in the Punjab. In 1854 he became financial commissioner of the Punjab province. On 10 October 1854 he married the daughter of Robert Montgomery, however after falling ill in Dharamshala, she passed a few months after their wedding.

He was at Lahore during the Indian Rebellion of 1857 and at its conclusion was made a Companion of The Most Honourable Order of the Bath. He briefly returned to England in 1859 after an absence of thirty years. In 1861 he was made President of the Famine Relief Committee.

In 1865, on the recommendation of John Lawrence, he was made Lieutenant Governor of the Punjab. The following year he was awarded the Knight Commander of the Order of the Star of India. As Lieutenant governor McLeod continued the paternalistic strategy begun by the Lawrence brothers, and continued to develop the resources of the Punjab by constructing roads, railways and canals. An active president of the Agri-Horticultural Society of the Punjab, at his own expense he imported a large number of plants and trees to the Punjab from around the world. His rule coincided with a period of peace in the Punjab, helped by friendlier relations with the Emirate of Afghanistan.

An advocate of allowing locals to manage their own social and municipal affairs, he established municipalities in over three hundred areas and actively promoted education to train locals in administration. He encouraged Oriental Studies and voiced his opinion on education in vernacular languages. Due to his efforts, the Indian Government introduced vernaculars in universities alongside English and agreed to the establishment of the Oriental College in Lahore in 1866. His efforts won praises from the natives and the officials. In his honour, the McLeod Medal was introduced, open to pupils across the province and which awarded a cash prize for the best examination result in an oriental language.

Towards the end of his five-year term he requested and was granted a six-month extension so he could receive the Duke of Edinburgh during his proposed visit to India and introduce him to the Punjab. His farewell banquet was held at Lahore on 5 May 1870 and included encomiums from his friend Lord Napier of Magdala, and Lord Mayo the Viceroy of India.

== Later life and death ==
On his retirement in 1870, he returned to England and settled in London, where he was made chairman of the Scinde, Punjab & Delhi Railway. In London he was known to be sympathetic to the plight of the poor in the East End, and was a member of the East London Mission and Relief Fund.

At around 5 pm on 28 November 1872, when on his way to a meeting of the Christian Vernacular Education Society for India, he was mortally injured from an accident at Gloucester Road station on the London Underground. Arriving at the Metropolitan Line platform, the station inspector told McLeod that he was too late to catch the train heading towards South Kensington; moments later, he shouted "stop, you will be run over". A report on the incident in the Belfast News on 4 December stated, "It seems that he must have attempted to enter his compartment while the carriages were already in motion, and that, falling with the sudden and violent movement of the train, he was dragged along for several yards. The right arm, which probably to the last had retained its hold upon the platform and footboards, was uninjured. But the left arm and both legs were nearly severed from the body, although the train was stopped with praiseworthy promptitude." McLeod was taken to St. George's Hospital, where his right arm was amputated whilst he was induced by ether. He died surrounded by friends and family a few hours later.

McLeod is buried on the east side of the south section of the central north–south path in Kensal Green Cemetery in London.

== Legacy ==
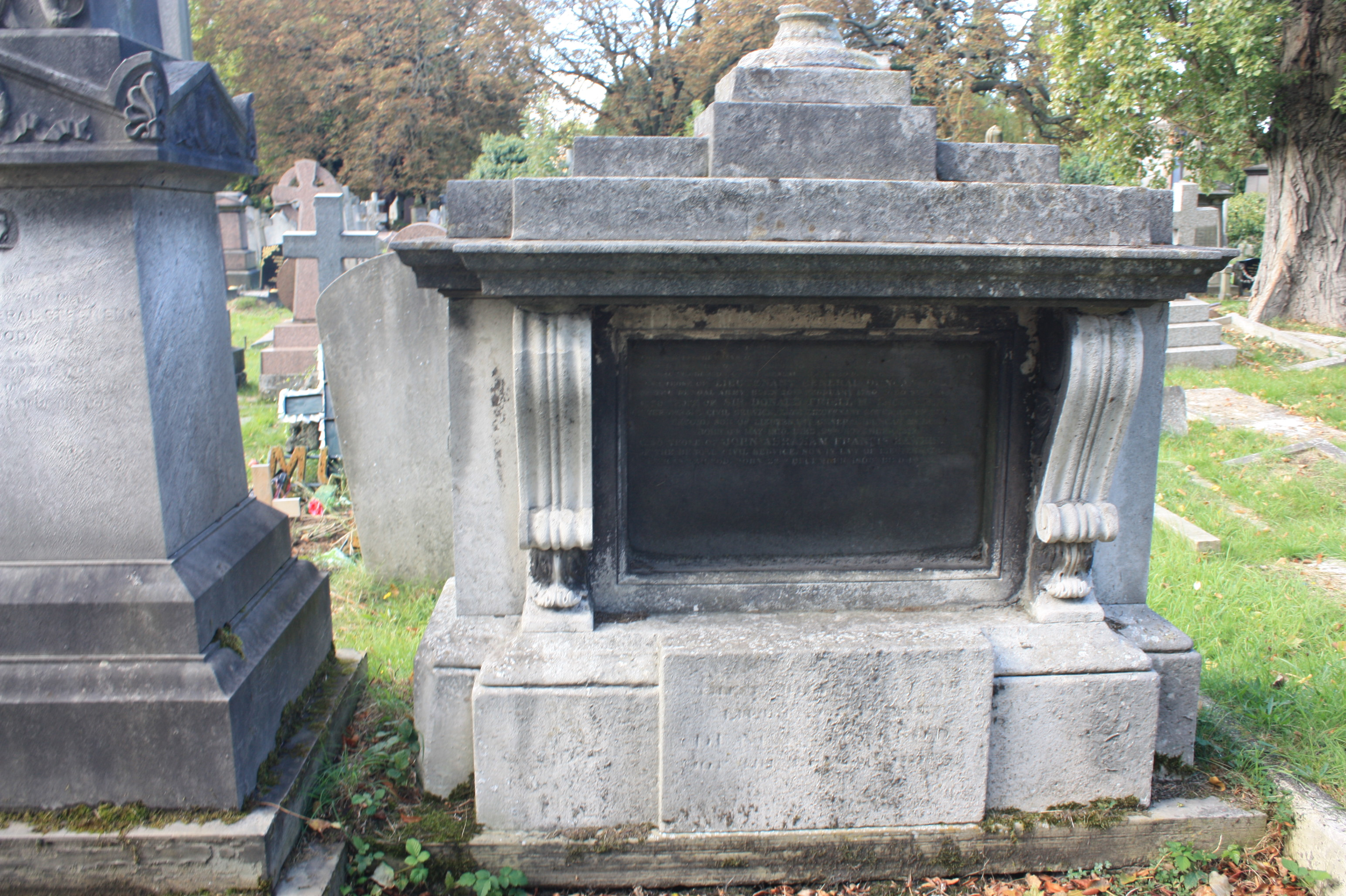
Grave of Sir Donald Friell McLeod at Kensal Green Cemetery

He was a Baptist and known for his religious observance. He was also a philanthropist, and on retiring to London had little financial means beyond his pension. Shortly after his death, his collection of some 2,000 books was purchased in 1873 by the newly established University College, Lahore (now the University of the Punjab) as the foundation for its university library.

His friend John Lawrence called him a cunctator, describing him as morally and intellectually having no superior in the Punjab, but noting as an administrator he wasted much time on unimportant matters, spending half the day writing "elegant demi-official chits". On his death he was widely respected for having gained the esteem of both locals and Europeans.

The town of McLeod Ganj is named after him, as is McLeod Road in Lahore. McLeod's Mews in South Kensington was allegedly named after him.

== Literature ==
- Lake, Major-General Edward John. Sir Donald McLeod, C.B., K.C.S.I: A record of forty-two years' service in India. London: The Religious Tract Society, 1873.
- McLeod, Sir Donald Friell, an entry in: Charles Edward Buckland. Dictionary of Indian biography. London, 1906.
