= Margaret Hubery =

Margaret Joyce Hubery AM
- Born: Margaret Joyce Foley; 19 June 1928; Perth, Western Australia
- Died: 3 January 2015 (aged 86); Hollywood Private Hospital, Perth
- Occupation: Nurse
- Known for: Director of Nursing at Royal Perth Hospital

Margaret Joyce Hubery AM (née Foley; 19 June 1928 – 3 January 2015) was a Western Australian nurse and nursing administrator.

== Career ==
Hubery was educated at Sacred Heart Primary School and College in Highgate, Western Australia. She then received general nursing training at Royal Perth Hospital and midwifery training at Crown Street Women's Hospital in Sydney. She was awarded a Florence Nightingale Scholarship to study nursing administration at The College of Nursing in Melbourne.

After marriage in 1967, she spent seven years on a dairy farm at Bridgetown, Western Australia. In that time, she had two daughters, established a local Silver Chain District Nursing Service and served on the Bridgetown Hospital board.

In 1978, she was appointed to the position of Director of Nursing at Mount Henry Hospital for the Aged. A few years later she was granted a scholarship to study aged care and palliative care in the United Kingdom, Sweden and Denmark. She joined the board of Silver Chain in 1979. In 1984 she was appointed Director of Nursing at Royal Perth Hospital. She also took on being the first female director of Southern Cross Care (WA) (a Catholic aged care agency) from 1993 to 2005 (including chairperson 1997 to 1999). The Margaret Hubery House residential care home and retirement complex in Shelley was named for her in 2000.

== Awards ==
Hubery was made a member of the Order of Australia in the 1993 Australia Day Honours In recognition of service to nursing and to the community. The same year, she was inducted into the Equestrian Order of the Holy Sepulchre of Jerusalem. She was renowned for her strong faith and commitment to the Catholic Church. She was inducted to the Western Australia Hall of Fame in 2015.

== Personal life ==
Margaret Foley married Percy Hubery in Bridgetown, Western Australia on 28 January 1967. They had two daughters. She spent her last two years living in Margaret Hubery House, an aged care facility named in her honour, and died at Hollywood Private Hospital.
