= Richard Condie (bishop) =

Australian Bishop

The Right Reverend Richard Condie
- Bishop of Tasmania
- Church: Anglican Church of Australia
- See: Anglican Diocese of Tasmania
- Installed: 19 March 2016
- Predecessor: John Harrower

Richard Condie (born 1965) is the Anglican Bishop of Tasmania. He was installed as bishop on 19 March 2016. Condie was previously vicar of St Jude's Church, Carlton, and an archdeacon in the Diocese of Melbourne. He is the leader of the Fellowship of Confessing Anglicans in Australia.

Condie has also been a lecturer in New Testament at Ridley Theological College and a research officer with the Queensland Police Service.

In 2022, Condie declared that he would not be celebrating Australia Day as a holiday.

Anglican Communion titles
Preceded by John Harrower	Bishop of Tasmania; 2016–present	Incumbent
