= Robert Hay (bishop of Tasmania) =

Australian bishop

Robert Snowdon Hay (1867–1943) was the Anglican Bishop of Tasmania from 1919 until 1943.

He was educated at Bishop Barrington School and Hatfield College, Durham and ordained in 1894. He then held curacies at Leadgate and South Hylton before emigrating to Australia. He was Rector of Laidley, Queensland then Bundaberg and Warwick. Later he was Dean of Hobart before being ordained to the episcopate. He died on 3 February 1943 and there is a memorial to him at Launceston Grammar School.

Anglican Communion titles
Preceded by Reginald Stephen	Bishop of Tasmania; 1919–1943	Succeeded by Geoffrey Cranswick
