= Robert Montgomery (civil servant) =

British administrator and civil servant (1809–1887)

Sir Robert Montgomery
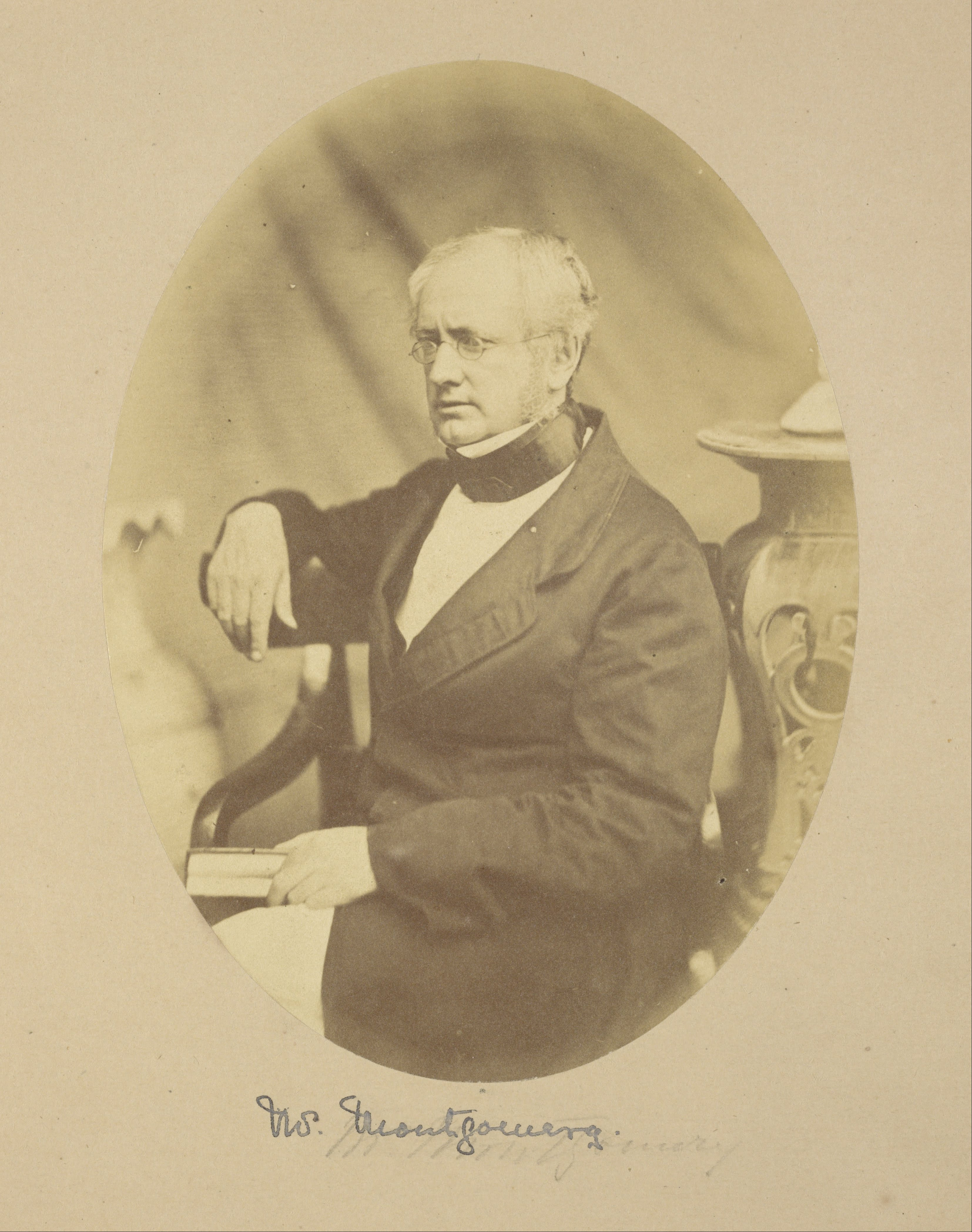

Chief Commissioner of Oudh
- In office 3 April 1858 – 15 February 1859

Lieutenant Governor of Punjab
- In office 25 February 1859 – 10 January 1865
- Governors General: The Earl Canning; The Earl of Elgin; Sir John Lawrence, Bt
- Preceded by: Sir John Lawrence, Bt
- Succeeded by: Sir Donald McLeod

Personal details
- Born: 2 December 1809 Moville, County Donegal, Ireland
- Died: 28 December 1887 (aged 78) London, England
- Spouse: Frances Thomason (m. 1842)
- Children: Henry Montgomery
- Education: Addiscombe Military Seminary
- Occupation: Civil servant

Sir Robert Montgomery GCSI, KCB (2 December 1809 – 28 December 1887) was a British administrator and civil servant in colonial India. He was Chief Commissioner of Oudh during the period of 1858 to 1859 and later served as Lieutenant Governor of Punjab between 1859 and 1865.

== Biography ==
=== Early life ===
Montgomery was born into an Ulster-Scots family at the family seat at New Park in Moville, a small town in Inishowen in the north of County Donegal in Ulster, the northern province in Ireland. He was educated at Foyle College, Derry; Wraxall Hall School, Wiltshire; and, from 1823 to 1825, at Addiscombe Military Seminary, Croydon, Surrey.

=== Career ===
In 1826, he entered the civil service of the East India Company. His first notable position was as a commissioner in Cawnpore.

In 1849, Montgomery was made a Commissioner at Lahore. The following year he replaced Charles Grenville Mansel on the Board of Administration, the body responsible for governing the Punjab. His two colleagues in the Board of Administration, Henry Lawrence and John Lawrence were both, like Montgomery, alumni of Foyle College. Following a re-organisation in 1853, the Board of Administration was replaced with John Lawrence as Chief Commissioner, and Montgomery was made both his Deputy and Judicial Commissioner. Over the next four years, he was the Chief Judge of Appeal in the Punjab, head of the police force, superintendent of roads, controller of local and municipal funds and responsible for education.

In May 1857, at the start of the Indian Rebellion, he was in Lahore. He immediately had the native garrison disarmed, which prevented them from taking any action in the rebellion. He was awarded with a knighthood for this action. During the period of 3 April 1858 to 15 February 1859, he was Chief Commissioner of Oudh.

He returned to the Punjab in 1859 to succeed John Lawrence as Lieutenant-Governor. He was made a K.C.B. on 19 May 1859. On 1 March 1862 he opened the first section of the Punjab Railway, connecting Lahore with Amritsar, to much fanfare. His tenure as Lieutenant-Governor ended in 1865 and he was succeeded by his son-in-law Donald Friell McLeod. On 20 February 1866 he was made a G.C.S.I.

After returning to England, he was appointed to the Council of India in 1868, serving until his death in 1887.

=== Death ===
He died on 28 December 1887 in London of bronchitis, aged 79, and was interred in the family vault in St Columb's Cathedral, Derry, on 3 January 1888. There is a memorial to him in St Paul's Cathedral.

== Family ==
He married Frances Thomason, a sister of James Thomason whilst in India; she died of smallpox at Allahabad in 1842. His second son was Henry Hutchinson Montgomery, father of Field Marshal The 1st Viscount Montgomery of Alamein. Henry inherited the family estate in Ireland after his father's death.

== Eponyms ==
- The city of Sahiwal, Pakistan, founded in 1865, was formerly named "Montgomery", after Sir Robert Montgomery.
- The district of Montgomery in Punjab.
