= Robert Davies (bishop) =

Australian Anglican bishop (1913–2002)

Robert Edward Davies CBE (30 July 1913 – 17 May 2002) was the Anglican Bishop of Tasmania from 1963 to 1981.

Educated at Queensland University, he was ordained in 1937 and began his career as an assistant priest at Christ Church Cathedral, Newcastle, NSW. After World War II service as a chaplain with Toc H and the Royal Australian Air Force he became Warden of St John's College Brisbane. After this he was Archdeacon of Canberra, then Wagga Wagga. He became an assistant bishop of Newcastle and Warden of St John's Theological College, Morpeth in 1960 and three years later the Tasmanian diocesan bishop.

Davies was appointed a Commander of the Order of the British Empire (CBE) in the 1981 Birthday Honours.

Anglican Communion titles
Preceded by Geoffrey Cranswick	Bishop of Tasmania; 1963–1981	Succeeded by Philip Newell
