= Edward Mercer =

Tasmanian Anglican bishop

John Edward Mercer, DD (13 February 1857 – 28 April 1922) was the Anglican Bishop of Tasmania from 1902 until 1914.

== Biography ==
Mercer by David Low

Mercer was born in Bradford, Yorkshire, the son of a clergyman, and educated at Rossall School and Lincoln College, Oxford. Ordained by the Bishop of Durham in 1880, his first post was as a curate at Tanfield, Durham, followed by a year at Penshaw. He was then Chaplain/Missioner at his old school before two Manchester incumbencies at Angel Meadow and Gorton. Nearly all his work during his early years was in poor, working-class parishes, and he took a great interest in social work, including work to improve living conditions in Manchester.

He was appointed Bishop of Tasmania in May 1902, and consecrated by the Archbishop of Canterbury at St Paul's Cathedral on 13 July 1902. He had received the honorary degree Doctor of Divinity (DD) from the University of Oxford the previous month.

An eminent Christian scholar, on his return from the colonial episcopate he continued to serve the Church as a Canon Residentiary at Chester Cathedral and finally, from 1919 until his death, as Archdeacon of Macclesfield. During the First World War, he deputised for Francis Jayne, bishop of Chester, whose health was fragile, on a number of occasions.

He had married firstly Josephine Archdall, who died in Tasmania. He later remarried Harriet Ethel Bennion on his return to England.

Anglican Communion titles
Preceded by Henry Montgomery	Bishop of Tasmania; 1902 –1914	Succeeded by Reginald Stephen
