= Rae Anstee =

Australian nurse

Dorothy Rae Anstee AM DStJ (15 August 1932 – 3 July 2025) was an Australian nurse. She worked in various nursing positions at the Royal Children's Hospital, Melbourne, from 1961-1977. In 1977, she was appointed Director of Nursing at the Austin Hospital, Melbourne, a position she held until 1995. She received the Member of the Order of Australia award in 1993, in recognition of her service to nursing, particularly as director of nursing at the Austin hospital.

== Career ==
Anstee started her nursing career in 1961 as a Staff Nurse and Sister at the Royal Children's Hospital in Melbourne, Australia. She remained at this hospital through various roles including Charge Nurse (1963–1969), Supervisory Sister (1969) and assistant director of Nursing (1970–1977).

Anstee's career progressed further in 1977 when she became the Director of Nursing at Austin Hospital in Victoria, Australia, a position she held until 1995.

== Recognition ==
Her contributions to the field were recognized in 1993 when she was awarded the Member of the Order of Australia (AM). The honor of inclusion into the AM is one of the highest recognitions for outstanding service in Australia.

Anstee also served on the Medical Practitioners Board of Victoria. She contributed to various subcommittees, including Finance and Administration, as well as Health and Sexual Misconduct.

Anstee was Session Clerk of Scots' Church, Melbourne and chairwoman of The Scots' Church Properties Trust, where she was a Trustee from 1997. Anstee also served on the Monash University Council, starting in 1986.
