= Christopher Jones (biologist) =

Christopher Jones is an American vintage race car driver, innovator and venture investor with a strong interest and PhD in health economics, particularly as it applies to improving outcomes and reducing healthcare costs. In the early 2000s, he presented a report, first to then-British Chancellor Gordon Brown and then in the House of Commons, that led to policy changes to the maximum allowable number of transferred embryos during the course of a woman's in vitro fertilisation treatment. The Times in London reported that Jones' report induced immediate action by the Human Fertilisation and Embryology Authority but divided fertility doctors: half viewed this as a good policy from a public health vantage point, the other half viewed the move as over-regulation in personal affairs. Regardless, Jones showed in a co-authored letter that was published in The New England Journal of Medicine that twins are six times more likely to occur following in vitro fertilisation, compared with natural conceptions, even when only one embryo was implanted. This led to cost reductions to the National Health Services of GBP 60 million per year that would otherwise have been spent on ineffective treatments or neonatal intensive care due to excessive numbers of multiple births. He was appointed director of bilateral collaborations at the Center for Study of Multiple Birth, a non-profit devoted entirely to research into the health of multiples. Although few had heard of such a trend in 2003, Jones predicted and found that medical tourism and more particularly reproductive tourism away from the United Kingdom, along with an epidemic of multiple births, would be the likely results of fertility regulation.

== Biography ==
Jones earned a bachelor's degree with distinction in biology from the University of Michigan, Ann Arbor, where he studied genetics and chronic disease under the supervision of James V. Neel and evolution in classes taught by Richard D. Alexander.

Jones then matriculated in Christ Church, Oxford University earning two post-graduate degrees, starting with a Master's in Human Biology. While at Christ Church, he was elected Social Secretary of the Graduate Common Room.

In the early 2000s Jones was president of Oxford's controversial banking forum. This forum brought international financial services leaders from around the world to discuss frank academic issues. Attendees included Nobel Laureate Robert Mundell, inventor of the currency known as the Euro. During the Oxford years, Jones won a fellowship from the Bertarelli Foundation in Switzerland, created by Ernesto Bertarelli and Donna Bertarelli Spaeth, to develop a cost-effective framework of fertility treatment that would preserve the dignity of human life. After earning his doctorate in health economics/medical sciences from Oxford, he became a junior faculty member at the Johns Hopkins University School of Public Health.

Jones grew up in Gilford, New Hampshire to a family of early New England settlers on his paternal side (Jones and Tabor). His grandfather Art Jones was stationed as a U.S. Naval officer in Newfoundland. His grandfather's family came from Waitsfield, Vermont. Art was born in New Hampshire however to a military family and played minor league baseball in Penacook. Chris' great-great-grandfather, Horace Austin Warner "HAW" Tabor, of Hungarian extraction, hailed from Holland Vermont (as did his first wife and Mayflower descendant, Augusta Pierce), but left stonecutting and the East Coast snow to become the legendary silver baron, senator and first lieutenant governor of Colorado. HAW was a republican, anti-slavery advocate, and benefactor to the arts. The Tabor Opera House was once the largest theatre west of the Mississippi. It attracted the likes of Oscar Wilde. Jones' maternal grandfather was a U.S. Marine.

== Patron of the arts ==
Jones has from time to time raised funds for his friends in the scientific and bohemian communities, to launch projects of profound artistic, scientific and intellectual merit. In 2008 Jones assisted his Motown friends to market the "Martin Luther King Feature Film" in the Gulf, starting in Dubai. Jones led Motown legend Mark Davis, producer of the soundtrack to the film Animal House to a meeting with His Royal Highness Sheikh Saud of Ras El Khaimeh. The film was renamed Selma after the rights were purchased by Steven Spielberg. In 2009 Jones led a British television delegation to visit His Royal Highness Sheikh Abdulla bin Hamad in the Kingdom of Bahrain.

== Author and Inventor ==
Dr. Jones is writing a book on optimizing flexibility in the workplace, citing examples from on the spot observations in American and European companies. The book focuses on the modern need to speak both academic and business languages, and to use those languages to identify points of commonality, while highlighting the opportunities and challenges of being within the "white space" on organizational charts.

With another inventor and colleague, Jones owns a United States Patent for a novel way of freezing specimens, and he continues to invent and license products to medical and conservation initiatives.

== Predictive modeling ==
In 2010, Jones and his team of researchers published a paper describing a virtual tool to predict infertile women's chances of taking home a healthy baby, to an accuracy of 80%. Whereas previously researchers could only provide chances of pregnancy, this take-home baby calculator presents results in terms of a healthy baby who survives 27 days of life. By creating this software, Jones essentially created a novel business model, namely the translation of esoteric population-based data into meaningful recommendations to individual, data-savvy beneficiaries.

== Translator of population-based statistics ==
Jones was one of the early researchers to link reproductive biology to economics, arriving in 1999 at something called health economics which had been in development for nearly twenty years but which as a field of natural science, remains in its infancy. He made headlines in investor news with the launch of his online take-home baby calculator called For My Odds.

== Media ==
Jones was in the news following his efforts to promote awareness of medical tourism, a trend whereby individuals from developed countries seek superior or bargain medical treatments outside of their home country, and in locations that are either more affordable or more equipped with specialised care.

== Diplomacy ==
Jones has remained non-political but rather diplomatic, viewing global harmony as one of the most important challenges of the next century. While he was born in Washington D.C., he has spent half of his life overseas. This has led him to bring to the U.S. certain aspects of health economics that have been shown to work in international settings, and advocate for a renewed foreign policy towards global prosperity; that is, improving the health and wellbeing of people and families around the globe so that they can thrive with dignity and economic opportunities. In Paris, he was asked to be co-Founder of the UNESCO sponsored World Academy for New Thinking, an initiative founded in Malta by Edward DeBono. His banking forum established a new form of academic-industry-government collaboration, leading inter alia to what is now called CapitOx, Oxford's fast-growing finance and actuarial society.

== Teacher ==
Dr. Jones leads venture investments for the University of Vermont Health Network, is co-founder of a syndicate of 26 hospital systems each with venture funds, and is affiliated associate professor in the University of Maryland School of Pharmacy, one of the oldest schools of pharmacy in the United States. He is a retired (elected) voting member of the New England Comparative Effectiveness Public Advisory Council (CEPAC), and active in the International Society for Pharmacoeconomics and Outcomes Research (ISPOR), the European Centre for International Political Economy (ECIPE) and the World Financial Forum (WFF). From 2012-2017 Dr. Jones held a faculty appointment in the University of Vermont Larner College of Medicine where he taught health economics and business.

== Personal life ==
Jones and Victoria Brassart reside in Vermont with their daughters Johanna, Lys, and Ella-Maria, and son Antoine-Hugo.
