= Don Williams (Australian railway) =

Dr Don Williams AO HonFIEAust CPEng FTSE (1937–2001) was born into a railway family. With sound business acumen and keen intellect he oversaw revolution in Australian railway practices during the 1980s and helped initiate reform processes that continued for many years after he left the railway industry.

== Early career ==
Williams began his railway career in 1954 as an engineering cadet for the Western Australian Government Railways (WAGR), and by 1959 graduated from the University of Western Australia, where he became a Design Engineer, a position he would hold until 1964 when he briefly became the Acting Assistant District Engineer based at Kalgoorlie. In 1965 Williams resigned from the WAGR on completion of his indenture.

After leaving the WAGR Williams undertook further university studies. He undertook post-graduate degrees specialising in bridge design at Rice University in Texas and Imperial College London, gaining a PhD in 1969. In 1971 Williams returned to Australia to work for Redpath Dorman Long, a British company tasked with the redesign and reconstruction of the West Gate Bridge in Melbourne, that collapsed during initial construction in 1970. He was the Project Engineer for the project, but left in March 1977 before the bridge was officially opened.

== Working at Australian National ==
Subsequently, Williams took up the role of Assistant General Manager, Engineering and Planning, for Australian National Railways Commission, which later became Australian National (AN), creating the 'AN corporate plan No.1' within his first year, a document that outlined the AN's goal of becoming profitable within ten years – the first time an Australian publicly owned railway initiated this type of business philosophy. In 1979 Williams overcame much criticism to become General Manager for AN, and between 1980 and 1988 instigated many changes, including the introduction of a new corporate identity, while significant buildings and railway infrastructure were also built, and new locomotives and rolling stock introduced.

During this period Williams achieved his corporate plan goals, but in doing so AN was required to make some hard decisions, in particular with regard to line and station closures. During the 1980s Williams modernised the business side of the railways by introducing computerised business systems to improve information management. In 1986 AN introduced the computerised Train Information Management System (TIMS) which could recall details of 87,117 registered items of rolling stock operating on the mainland and in Tasmania, as well as also give their location at any point in time.

== Later career ==
In early 1988 Williams left AN and became Managing Director of the Australian Submarine Corporation (ASC), which was built the six controversial Collins Class submarines for the Royal Australian Navy. The hull of the first Australian built submarine HMAS Collins was laid down in February 1990, and was formally launched by Williams on 28 August 1993. In late 1993, after six years with ASC, Williams decided to leave the company and became a railway consultant from 1994 to 1997, working for the Indian Railways and China Railway Corporation, as well as heading SA Ships which built and sold ships for the Australian and international markets.

In 1997 Williams began work with Kinhill Engineering, developing the engineering program and establishing funding for the construction of the Alice Springs to Darwin railway line. In 2000 Williams became the General Manager for FreightLink, the company that would operate freight trains over the new railway line. With his untimely passing in 2001, he did not see the project completed.

== Biography ==
Donald Gatherer Williams was born 23 August 1937 in Fremantle, Western Australia, where his father worked for the WAGR as the Chief Civil Engineer. The family also spent time in Northam and Kalgoorlie, where Williams developed a love and respect of the outback and the people living there.

Williams was a constant supporter of local communities located along the Trans-Australian Railway line, where he attended the annual race days at Tarcoola and Rawlinna as well as the children's annual sports days at Cook. He was also a strong supporter of railway preservation in South Australia, and was a keen supporter of the National Railway Museum in Port Adelaide.

During his life Williams received many awards and honours including:

- 1985 Awarded the Howard Medal by the British Institution of Engineers
- 1991 Elected a Fellow of the Australian Academy of Technological Sciences and Engineering
- 1993 Made an Officer of the Order of Australia
- 1998 Received an honorary doctorate from the University of South Australia
- 2013 Inducted posthumously into the Engineers Australia South Australian Hall of Fame

Williams died on 7 August 2001.

== Bibliography ==
- Donovan, P., O’Neil, B. and Jay, C., The Long Haul: Australian National 1978-1988, Focus Books Pty Ltd, Double Bay, 1992
