= Geoffrey Cranswick =

Anglican bishop of Tasmania

The Right Reverend Geoffrey Franceys Cranswick
- Bishop of Tasmania
- Church: Anglican Church of Australia
- Diocese: Diocese of Tasmania
- In office: 1944–1963
- Predecessor: Robert Hay
- Successor: Robert Davies

Orders
- Consecration: 25 January 1944 by William Temple

Personal details
- Born: April 10, 1894 Sydney, Australia
- Died: July 19, 1978 (aged 84)
- Denomination: Anglican
- Parents: Canon Edward Glanville Cranswick
- Occupation: Bishop, missionary, school principal
- Education: University of Sydney

Geoffrey Franceys Cranswick (10 April 1894 – 19 July 1978) was the Anglican Bishop of Tasmania from 1944 to 1963.

Cranswick was born in Sydney, a son of Canon Edward Glanville Cranswick (c. 1853 – 24 March 1934). He was educated at The King's School, Parramatta, Sydney Church of England Grammar School and the University of Sydney (B.A., 1916).

Cranswick was made deacon at Michaelmas 1920 (3 October) and ordained priest the Michaelmas following (2 October 1921) — both times by John Watts Ditchfield, Bishop of Chelmsford, at Chelmsford Cathedral — to a curacy at West Ham before being with the Church Mission Society (CMS) in Bengal to 1937 and then Principal of King Edward's School Chapra until his ordination to the episcopate to serve as Bishop of Tasmania. He was consecrated a bishop on the Feast of the Conversion of Paul the Apostle 1944 (25 January) at Westminster Abbey by William Temple, Archbishop of Canterbury. He died on 19 July 1978 and is buried in the churchyard at St Matthew New Norfolk. His elder brother, George, was the Bishop of Gippsland from 1917 to 1942.

Anglican Communion titles
Preceded by Robert Hay	Bishop of Tasmania; 1944–1963	Succeeded by Robert Davies
