= Chris Roosevelt Jones =

Liberian footballer

Personal information
- Date of birth: 23 October 1991 (age 35)
- Height: 1.75 m (5 ft 9 in)
- Position: Midfielder

Team information
- Current team: FC Germania Friedrichstal
- Number: 10

Senior career*
Years	Team	Apps	(Gls)
2010–2013	ASV Durlach		
2013–2014	Karlsruher SC II	24	(1)
2014–2015	SVN Zweibrücken	7	(0)
2016–2019	1. FC Bruchsal	54	(2)
2019–	FC Germania Friedrichstal	63	(13)

International career^{‡}
2014	Liberia	1	(0)
- * Club domestic league appearances and goals as of 19:09, 30 January 2023 (UTC) ‡ National team caps and goals as of 18:20, 31 October 2014 (UTC)

Chris Roosevelt Jones (born 23 October 1991) is a Liberian footballer who plays for German club FC Germania Friedrichstal as a midfielder.

== Career ==
Jones has played club football in Germany for ASV Durlach, Karlsruher SC II, and SVN Zweibrücken.

He made his international debut for Liberia in 2014.
