= Chris Jones (wide receiver, born 1972) =

American football player (born 1972)

No. 25
- Position: Wide receiver

Personal information
- Born: June 3, 1972 (age 54)
- Listed height: 6 ft 3 in (1.91 m)
- Listed weight: 202 lb (92 kg)

Career information
- College: Mississippi State

Career history
- 1996: Hamilton Tiger-Cats

Chris T. Johns (born 1972) was an American former professional football wide receiver who played one season with the Hamilton Tiger-Cats of the Canadian Football League (CFL). He played college football at Mississippi State University.

== College career ==
Johns played for the Mississippi State Bulldogs from 1993 to 1995, recording 1,199 receiving yards and five touchdowns on 62 receptions.

== Professional career ==
Johns played in, and started, one game for the CFL's Hamilton Tiger-Cats in 1996.

== Coaching career ==
Johns is the head coach of the boys' track and field team and an assistant coach for the football team at Southwind High School in Memphis, Tennessee. He was previously an assistant coach for boys' track and field team at Southwind.
