= Jean Marion Tom =

- Born: 8 August 1922; Victoria, Romsey town, North Melbourne, Australia
- Died: 28 May 2017
- Education: M.Sc in Physiology
- Occupation: Community Worker
- Spouse: Willie
- Children: Marion Rose, Helen, Phyllis, Alison, Bill
- Parent(s): Jim(F), Ellie Spring(M)

Jean Marion Tom AO (1922–2017, née Spring) was an Australian community worker much involved with the Country Women's Association.

== Life ==
Tom was born on 8 August 1922 at Victoria, Romsey town, North Melbourne, Australia, the daughter of Romsey-based Jim and Ellie Spring.

Tom was a community worker, a scientist, and an MSc(Hons.) (Master of Science) graduate in Physiology from Melbourne University in 1944. She worked at the school of Physiology, Melbourne University. She had five children – Marion Rose, Helen, Phyllis, Alison and Bill. Her daughter Marion Rose was a geophysicist at the BHP Minerals Group, exploration department, Melbourne.

Tom was involved with the CWA (Country Women's Association) and offered her service for the welfare of women in remote and rural Australia. As a result, on 26 January 1993, she was appointed as an Officer of the Order of Australia (AO). She was also honoured by the RSL (Returned Service League) with the ANZAC of the year award in 1999. She was inducted onto the Victorian Honour Roll of Women in 2001. Tom died on 28 May 2017, after a short illness.

== Memberships ==
Tom was a member of many committees and organiaations such as Status of Women Committee, Victoria; Freedom from hunger committee; and the Victorian Fairlea Women's Prison Council. She was also a member at Victorian Consultative Council; member of the planning committee of White settlement in Victoria; Director and Trustee of the Victorian Women's Trust; National President and member of the Country Women's Association Australia; and also a Member of the National Women's Consultative Council.

Tom was the honorary state treasurer and president of the Country Women's Association, Victoria.
