= Leonard Long =

Australian painter

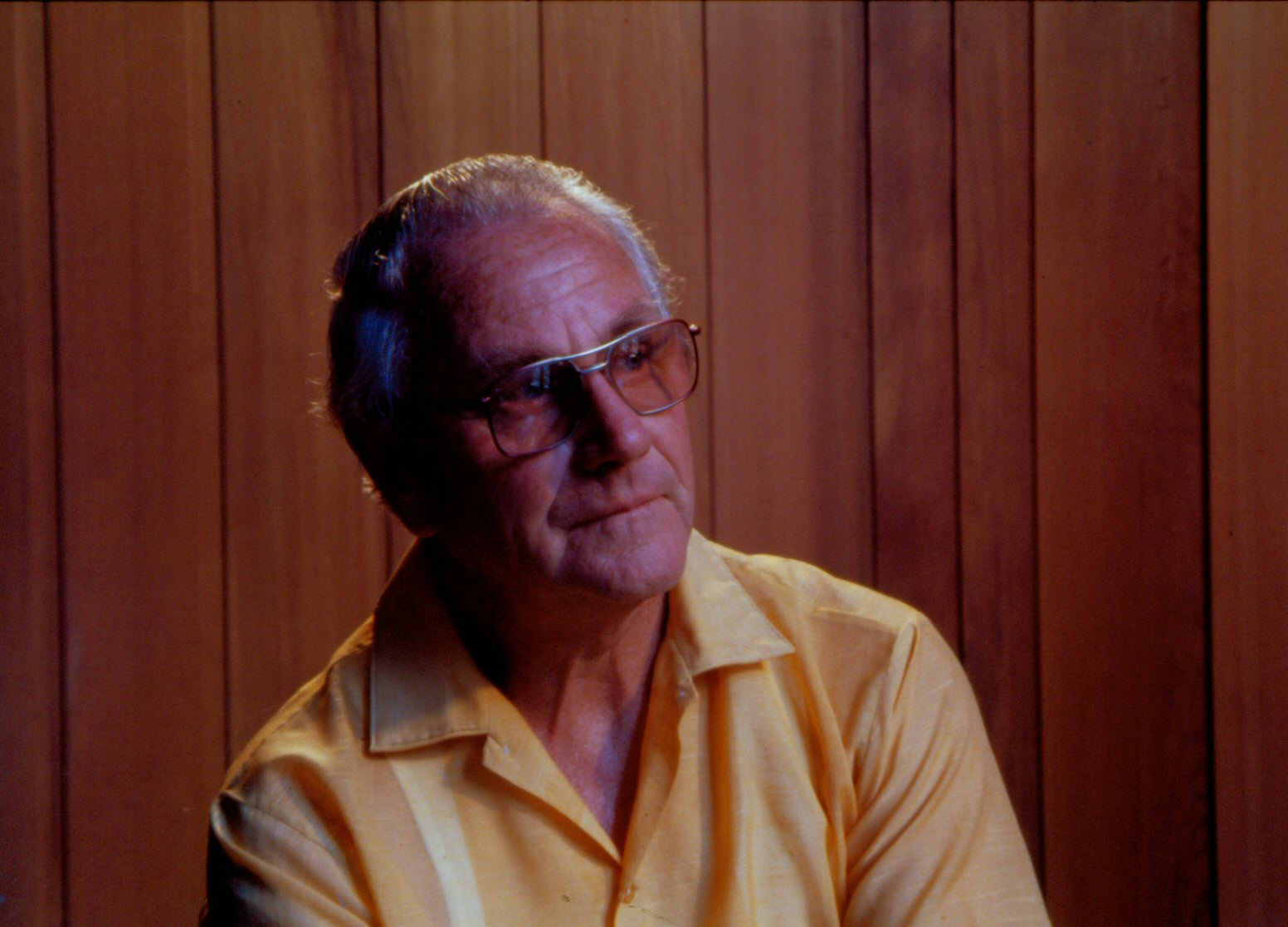
- Long, circa 1984
- Born: Leonard Hugh Long; 25 April 1911; Summer Hill, New South Wales, Australia
- Died: 3 November 2013 (aged 102); Melbourne, Australia
- Known for: Landscape painting
- Awards: Order of Australia (1993)

Leonard Hugh Long OAM (25 April 1911 – 3 November 2013) was an Australian painter of the Australian School of landscape painters.

== Early years ==
Born in Summer Hill, New South Wales, the son of a baker, Long was a landscape artist in oils. He was raised in Mittagong on the Southern Tablelands of New South Wales and showed an early aptitude for drawing. He painted his first painting at the age of 16. He started his working life as a watch-maker in nearby Bowral, later moving to Nowra for work.

== Early career ==
As a young man Long was a cyclist and rode his push bike long distances including the trip from Nowra back to Mittagong to see his sweetheart Mary whom he later married. In 1934, he and Mary settled in Nowra where they raised their family. They had twins Ray and Barry in 1936 and a daughter Carmel in 1938. By 1939, Long had become more seriously interested in Landscape Painting and spent more and more of his spare time painting. After returning from his civil service during the Second World War as a precision instrument maker, he sold his watch-making business to his partner and began full-time painting in 1955.

== Exhibitions ==
During his career, Long held many successful solo exhibitions throughout Australia and traveled extensively both within Australia and overseas. His first overseas trip was sponsored by the American millionaire John Galvin and the experience made a lasting impression on the artist. He knew and painted with many other Australian artists including Albert Namatjira. His works may be found in many private collections and is represented in many public galleries around the world.

== Older years ==
Long moved to Melbourne in 1980. On 26 January 1993, Long was awarded a Medal of the Order of Australia 'for service to the arts as a painter of Australian landscapes.' At the age of 100, Long continued to paint every day and staged his centenary exhibition on 14 May 2011 at Kim Nelson Fine Art & Editions in Yass, New South Wales, not far from the nation's capital, Canberra. He attributed his continued health to an active life and a medicinal scotch in the afternoon.

== Death ==
Long died after a short illness on 3 November 2013 at the age of 102.
