= Christopher Michael Jones =

American hip hop and R&B record producer

Christopher Michael Jones (born in 1969 in St. Albans, New York) is an American former hip hop and R&B record producer (Notorious B.I.G., "You Can't Stop the Reign", Nasty Nas, Shaquille O'Neal, S.W.V., Whodini, Toni Braxton, etc.) He is also the author of the first published resource written for African-American high school graduates and Christian college students entitled What to Expect When You're Accepted: An African American Christian's Guide to College (Judson Press 2007).

A hybrid of hip hop culture, the historical African-American church and the academy, Jones also serves as senior minister to First Baptist Church of Hillside, Adjunct Professor of Homiletics and Co-Mentor of the Doctor of Ministry Degree program in Pastoral Care and Counseling at New Brunswick Theological Seminary. Pastor Jones also studied Religion and Society as a Graduate Fellow at Christ Church College, University of Oxford, and was selected in 2006 as one of America's emerging young adult leaders by the NCAAP "Leadership 500 Summit".

Jones was selected in 2006 as the first graduate assistant and research fellow for the State of New Jersey Amistad Commission and was selected by The African American Pulpit in 2008 as one America's "20 to Watch", a group of outstanding pastors under 40 who have distinguished themselves as preachers, teachers, and scholars in the Christian Church. Jones is also a contributing writer to Gospel Today, EBONY magazine, Black Collegiate Magazine, and Precious Times Magazine. Pastor Jones serves as a lectionary contributor to the African American Lectionary, the first resource tool created for pastors and preachers to highlight the African American ecclesial traditions and moments that creatively express the African-American worship experience.

Jones holds a Bachelor of Arts degree from Rutgers University (2000–2004), a Master of Divinity Degree from Princeton Theological Seminary (2004–2007), and the Doctor of Ministry Degree from Memphis Theological Seminary (2008–2011).

On October 7, 2000, Jones married Nikki Michelle Etheridge and they are the parents of three children.
