= James and Browne =

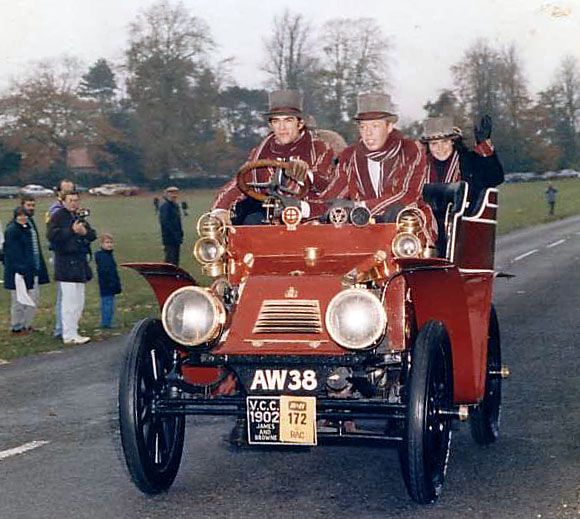
The surviving 1902 model.

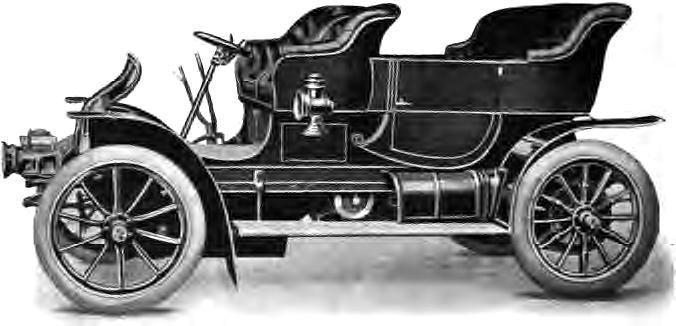
James and Browne car

James & Brown Omnibus (1910)

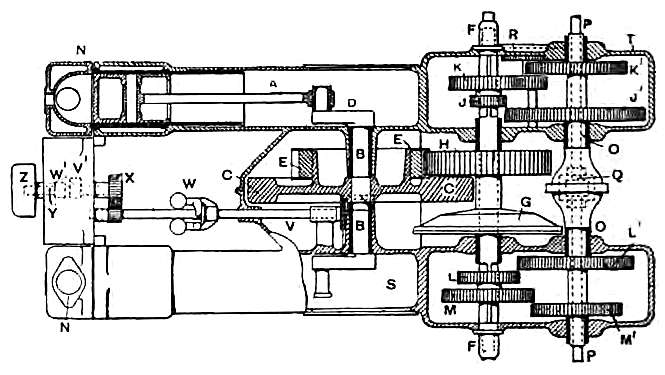
Horizontal section of James and Browne engine and gearbox, viewed from above.

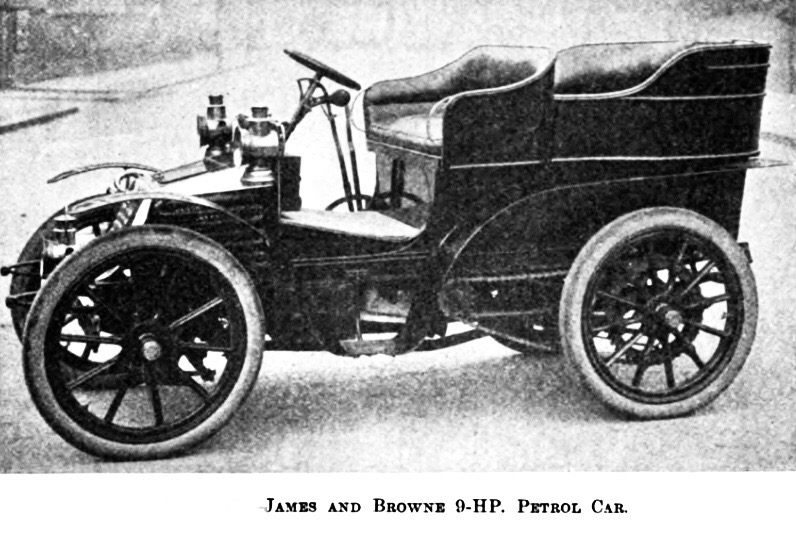
James and Browne 9 hp (1902-1904)

James & Browne was a British automobile manufacturer, based in Hammersmith, London between 1898 and 1910. The enterprise started in 1896 as a partnership between John Melville James, a former racing cyclist, and Tom Bousquet Browne. This partnership was dissolved in 1898, with Browne continuing the business with Francis Leigh Martineau under the James and Browne name.

The James & Browne factory was located at the Chiswick end of King's Street in West London, and a car showroom was on Oxford Street.

The early cars had an unusual engine layout with the flywheel between the cylinders. The engines were mid-mounted in the chassis, and the cylinders were horizontal. Drive was to the rear wheels via a 4-speed gearbox and chain. The gearbox is in 2 parts, linked by a connecting rod: the left one contains 2nd and 4th gears, and the right one contains 1st, 3rd, and reverse.

The 2-cylinder engine is rated at 9 HP and is just over 2.5 liters. A total-loss oiling system is used on the car, lubricating 6 main oil-ways. James & Browne also launched a 4-cylinder version (16 HP) of a similar design to the horizontal 2-cylinder engine.

In 1906 a vertical-engined car was introduced known as the Vertex and available as either a 20 hp four or 30/40 hp six-cylinder.

== Models ==
Model	Period	Cylinders	Bore x Stroke	Displacement	Performance	Wheelbase
14/16 HP	1906-1909	4 Cyl.	88.9 mm x 107.95 mm	163.5 cu in (2,680 cc)	13.9 hp (10 kW)	2,565 mm (101.0 in)
18/22 HP	1906	4 Cyl.	101.6 mm x 152.4 mm	301.6 cu in (4,942 cc)	18.6 hp (14 kW)	2,565 mm (101.0 in)
25/30 HP	1906-1910	4 Cyl.	114.3 mm x 152.4 mm	381.7 cu in (6,255 cc)	25 hp (19 kW)	2,565 mm (101.0 in)

== Surviving cars ==
Only two of their cars are known to have survived, one built in 1902 and the other in 1904. T.B. Browne, one of the company's founders, remained interested in the condition of the two surviving cars throughout his life and still regularly met with the owners until the early 1960s.

=== 1902 model ===
The car was built in 1902 and transported by train from the James and Browne works in Hammersmith, London to Albrighton Station, Shropshire. The first owner was Mr. Norman McLean of The Blue House, Tong, Shropshire. Mr. McLean had the car painted in the colours of his stables which were yellow with black lining. The car was then moved to Tong Castle, the home of his fiancée, Miss Hartley. The Hartley family had leased Tong Castle from Lord Bradford since 1855. Miss Hartley’s brother was John Hartley (tennis), the winner of the Wimbledon Gentlemen’s Singles Championship in 1879 and 1880.

Mr. McLean decided that some alterations to the car were required and instructed Mr. Ernest Roy Spencer to carry out the work. The Spencers were blacksmiths and ran their business at 15 Broadway, Shifnal, around three miles from Tong Castle.

In 1910 Mr. McLean decided to sell the car to Ernest Spencer for a nominal sum of £20, and the car was then moved to 15 Broadway, Shifnal. Ernest Spencer decided that Mr. McLean’s colour scheme was too conspicuous for general use and drinking trips, so decided to paint the car battleship grey with black piping. Mr. Spencer intended to convert the car to a pick-up truck for his business and fitted it with magneto ignition and a windscreen. However, with the outbreak of World War I in Summer 1914, the car was mothballed and stored in a shed at the back of the premises and stayed there until 1929.

In 1929 it was decided to enter the car in the Old Crock's Run to Brighton. The less permanent alterations to the car were removed and it was returned to as near original condition as possible. The car took part in the Brighton run on Sunday 20 October (entry number 25) and departed from the Mall at around 9am. The car had a good run but lost time when the battery terminals shook loose, and was the fifth car to arrive in Brighton.

In December 1929, ownership of the car passed to Mr. Herbert Ford who purchased the car from the Spencers for the sum of £35. Mr. Ford was a local man and shrewd businessman, and had owned nearby Lilleshall Hall since 1927. In 1930, Mr. Ford opened some pleasure gardens for the public at Lilleshall Hall, and these included an amusement park, narrow gauge railway and children's playgrounds. The car was used as an attraction in the amusement park. Mr. Ford and his friend, Mr. T.R. Price, entered the car in the 1933 Brighton Run on Sunday 12 November 1933. The car (entry number 21) completed the run successfully with an average speed of 19.61 mph.

In October 1934 the car was purchased by John Garland, Dick and Edward Riddle, three students at the City and Guilds College, part of Imperial College London. The car has been an active part of college life from 1934 to the present day. The car is still maintained by students and driven in many events including the London to Brighton Veteran Car Run.

=== 1904 model ===
The first owner of the 1904 car was the Rev Dr John Darlington, the vicar of St Mark's Church, Kennington in London, who also owned a house in Curry Rivel, near Taunton in Somerset. The Vicar had originally owned a Peugeot which had badly let him down in 1905, and as a friend of his had a reliable two-cylinder James & Browne car he visited the Showroom in Oxford Street and asked to buy a car "like the one my friend owns". Browne remembered this visit as he had to advise Darlington that the Company had ceased making two-cylinder models in 1904, but he could offer Darlington a new four-cylinder 1905 model. Darlington was adamant that he wanted a two-cylinder car, so it was arranged that an unused two-cylinder engine, gearbox and transmission from the workshop be fitted into a compatible spare chassis, but with a later model body designed for the four-cylinder car.

Ernest Proctor, who was employed at the Westcroft Works, was given the job of assembling this hybrid car, which comprised a very early two-cylinder engine - number 30 - of 1901 or 1902 vintage, a 1904 chassis - number 126, and a body destined for four-cylinder car number 156.

Technical data:

Engine: No.30. Twin-cylinder horizontal, each cylinder 4" dia. x 6" stroke. Inlet valves suction operated: exhaust valves mechanically operated. Water-cooled, with no pump or cooling fan.
Ignition: 6 volt battery producing ignition via 2 trembler coils (originally also fitted with magneto with switching between trembler and magneto as required). Conventional spark plugs.
Lubrication: Drip feed from reservoir on dashboard via sight glasses to 6 oiling points on main bearings and pistons.
Gearboxes: Two boxes - one for 1st. 3rd. and reverse, the other for 2nd. and 4th. with a sliding shaft between the two. Lubrication by splash feed in each box.
Transmission: Main drive from engine to gear boxes via heavy steel spur gear into a mating 'Buffoline' rawhide gear attached to the flywheel on the crank shaft.
Final Drive: By two chains via a differential.
Brakes: Foot brake operates on transmission. Hand brake is a conventional drum brake on the rear wheels only.
Wheels/tires: Originally wooden wheels with solid tires, but these were changed in the early years to Sankey type metal wheels and fitted with balloon tires.
Lighting: Side and rear lamps - oil (paraffin). Headlamps acetylene - gas produced from carbide/water accumulator.

The car was first registered Y184 and was delivered to Darlington at Kennington Vicarage on 10 March 1906. It was used in London until it was driven to Curry Rivel on 23 April 1906 by Henry Lucas, a James & Browne salesman, who remained with the owner for some time after delivery, to teach him how to drive and maintain the vehicle.

The car was driven by Darlington, accompanied by his eldest son John, in 1913/1914, on a 2,000 mile tour of Europe. At the outbreak of World War I, the car was taken back to Kennington where it remained until about 1925, when John Darlington Jr. "got it going again", and drove it back to Curry Rivel. By this time Dr. Darlington had purchased an Armstrong, so the James & Browne was stored in a barn.

When the James & Browne Company ceased trading, Henry Lucas (the salesman and chauffeur) with his colleague and friend Ernest Proctor were both made redundant. Lucas, with a partner John Drake, started a motor business in Egham, Surrey called the Egham Motor Company, and in 1914 asked Proctor to join them as Works Manager.

While on holiday in Somerset in 1938, Lucas called at the house in Curry Rivel to see what had happened to the Darlington family; Dr. Darlington was still there and so was the James & Browne car..... in the barn. Dr. Darlington gave the car to Lucas who brought it back to Egham where he and Proctor restored it. It was then kept in the showroom of The Egham Motor Company for many years.

However, when applying to register the car after its restoration, it was discovered that Dr. Darlington had transferred the original registration number, Y184, to his Armstrong, which was (and we believe, still is) on the road! Somerset County Council allocated the nearest unused number to the James & Browne ...Y182 - hence the temporary 2 was fixed over the 4 on the original number plates.

After World War II the car was officially dated by the Veteran Car Club as a 1904 model, and Lucas and Proctor entered it in the London to Brighton Run in November 1948 - the first London to Brighton run for the car. Henry Lucas was driving and Ernest Proctor was passenger.

Proctor's eldest son, Sidney, joined his father and Henry on many of the early runs, until Ernest died in 1958. By 1963, Lucas had become too infirm to continue to look after the car and, as he had no children, he sold the car to Sidney Proctor. On Sidney’s death the car passed to his son. The car was in the Proctor family until it was auctioned in November 2007.

== Stand 81, SMM&T 5th International Motor Exhibition February 1906 ==
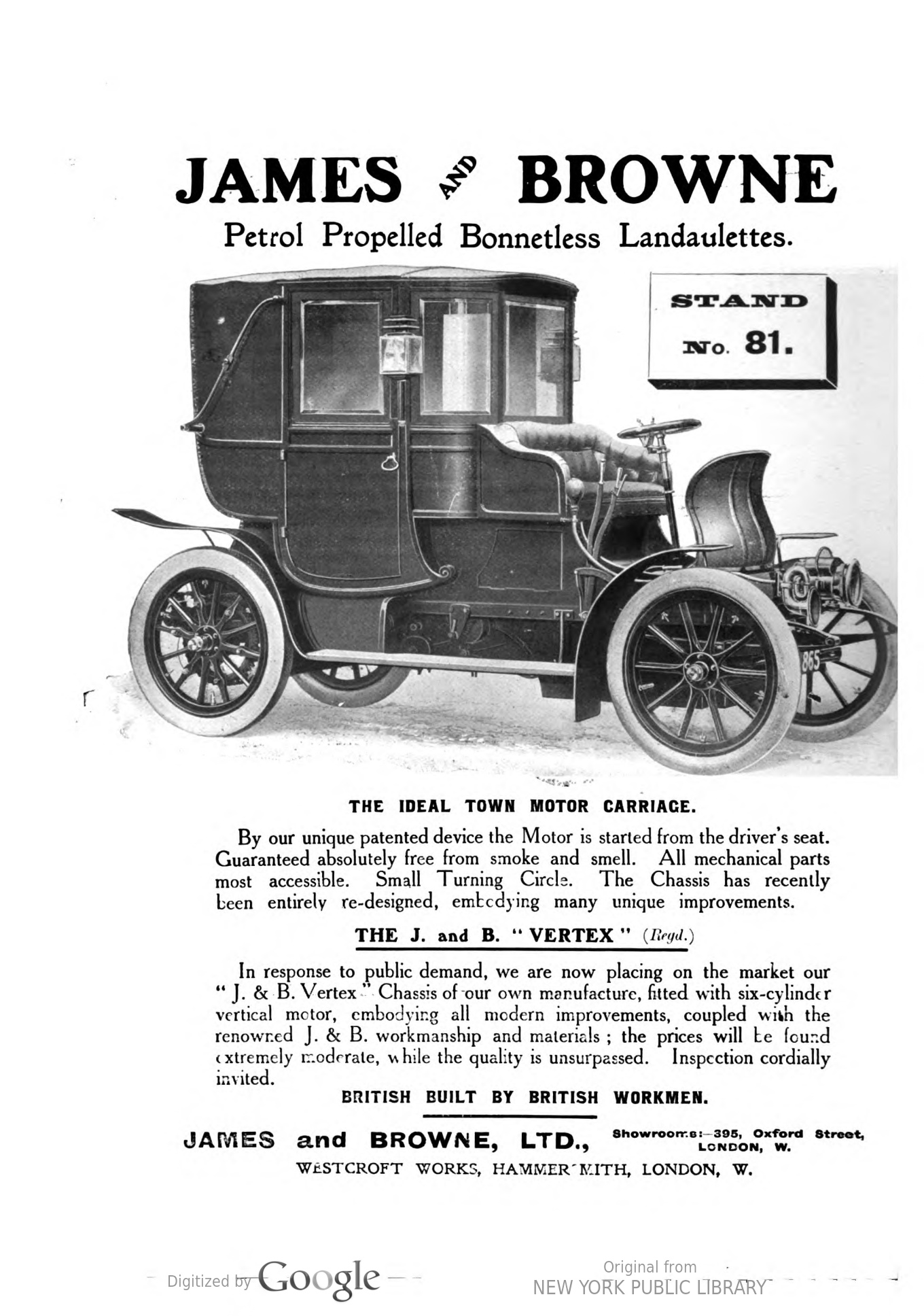

James & Browne's display from the official catalogue:

16-HP 4-cylinder J & B chassis: 4 speeds, 1 reverse, fitted with patent motor starter. Price £235 with tyres
16-HP 4-cylinder J & B double landaulette to seat four inside and two out. Price £385
30-HP 6-cylinder Vertex standard phaeton to seat five persons. Price £450
45-HP 6-cylinder Vertex saloon to seat seven persons. Price £775
45-HP 6-cylinder motor only on stand including set of parts manufactured by James & Browne Limited

== See also ==
- List of car manufacturers of the United Kingdom
