= John Harrower =

Anglican bishop of Tasmania

The Right Reverend John Harrower
- Bishop of Tasmania
- Church: Anglican Church of Australia
- Diocese: Tasmania
- In office: 2000–2015
- Predecessor: Philip Newell
- Successor: Richard Condie
- Other posts: Vicar of Glen Waverley; Assistant bishop in the Diocese of Melbourne (2015–2020)

Orders
- Consecration: 25 July 2000

Personal details
- Born: 16 October 1947 Melbourne, Victoria, Australia
- Spouse: Gayelene Harrower

John Douglas Harrower (born 16 October 1947) is an Australian Anglican bishop who served as the eleventh Bishop of Tasmania from 2000 to 2015.

Harrower was educated at the University of Melbourne and worked as a petroleum engineer and industrial consultant. In 1979, he went with the Church Missionary Society to Argentina, where he worked with university Christian groups. He was ordained as a deacon in 1984 and priest in 1986. Harrower returned to Australia in 1988 and became successively the Vicar of Glen Waverley and Archdeacon of Kew before his appointment to the episcopate in 2000. He retired at the end of September 2015.

From 2015 until 2020, Harrower worked as an assistant bishop in the Anglican Diocese of Melbourne, where his role is to assist Archbishop Philip Freier in his duties as Anglican Primate of Australia. His role involved document preparation, research, attendance at related meetings, assisting the Primate in his pastoral care to Australian bishops, and responsibility for the Archbishop's external media and communications. Harrower retired from the role when Freier's term as Primate ended on 31 March 2020.

He is married to Gayelene Harrower.

Anglican Communion titles
Preceded by Philip Newell	Bishop of Tasmania; 2000–2015	Succeeded by Richard Condie
