= Philip Newell =

Anglican Bishop of Tasmania

Phillip Keith Newell AO (30 January 1930 – 24 April 2022) was an Australian Anglican bishop who served as Bishop of Tasmania from 1982 to 2000.

Newell was born on 30 January 1930. He was educated at the University of Melbourne. After working as a mathematics teacher and tutor in physics, from 1958 Newell studied for ordination as a residential student at Trinity College Theological School, Melbourne, winning the Henty Theological Studentship. He became a priest in 1960. He was successively curate of St James', King Street, Sydney, rector of Christ Church, St Lucia, Brisbane, a canon residentiary of St John's Cathedral, Brisbane and finally (before being elected to the episcopate) Archdeacon of Lilley. He was consecrated a bishop on 24 August 1982.

In January 2016, Newell was accused of covering up for and further promoting convicted paedophile priest Louis Daniels at hearings of the Royal Commission into Institutional Responses to Child Sexual Abuse. Newell denied any cover up yet told the Commission that he apologised "from the bottom of my heart" for any harm his actions may have caused.

In 1993, Newell was appointed an Officer of the Order of Australia in the 1993 Australia Day Honours for "service to religion as Bishop of Tasmania, to education and the community".

Newell was married to Merle for 62 years. He died on 24 April 2022, at the age of 92.

In February 2024, Justice Michael Brett of the Supreme Court of Tasmania ordered the Anglican Diocese of Tasmania to pay almost A$2.4 million in damages to a 53 year old man, who had been abused by paedophile priest Louis Victor Daniels on multiple occasions during the 1980s. Justice Brett also said that he was "... satisfied that the impact on [the victim had] also been compounded to a significant extent by the response of [the then] Bishop Newell and the Church generally to [the victim's] disclosures of abuse, both at the time of the disclosures and over the years since."

Anglican Communion titles
Preceded by Robert Davies	Bishop of Tasmania; 1982–2000	Succeeded by John Harrower
