= Anglican Bishop of Tasmania =

Bishop of Tasmania
- Bishopric

anglican
- Coat of arms of the diocese
- Incumbent: Richard Condie since 19 March 2016
- Style: The Right Reverend

Location
- Country: Australia
- Ecclesiastical province: Extra-provincial

Information
- First holder: Francis Nixon
- Denomination: Anglicanism
- Established: 21 August 1842
- Diocese: Tasmania
- Cathedral: St David's Cathedral, Hobart

Website
- Diocese of Tasmania

The Lord Bishop of Tasmania is the diocesan bishop of the Anglican Diocese of Tasmania, Australia.

== List of Bishops of Tasmania ==
Bishops of Tasmania
No	From	Until	Incumbent	Notes
1	1842	1863	Francis Nixon	Consecrated 24 August 1842.
2	1864	1882	Charles Bromby	Later Assistant Bishop of Lichfield and Assistant Bishop of Bath and Wells.
3	1883	1889	Daniel Sandford FRSE	Later coadjutor bishop to two successive Bishops of Durham.
4	1889	1901	Henry Montgomery KCMG	Father of Field-Marshal Bernard Montgomery.
5	1902	1914	Edward Mercer	Later Archdeacon of Macclesfield.
6	1914	1919	Reginald Stephen	Previously Dean of Melbourne; translated to Newcastle.
7	1919	1943	Robert Hay	Previously Dean of Hobart; died in office.
8	1944	1963	Geoffrey Cranswick	
9	1963	1981	Robert Davies CBE	Previously Assistant Bishop of Newcastle.
10	1982	2000	Philip Newell	Previously Archdeacon of Lilley.
11	2000	2015	John Harrower	Later Assistant Bishop assisting the Primate of Australia.
12	2016	present	Richard Condie	Previously an archdeacon in the Diocese of Melbourne; consecrated 19 March 2016.

John Vernon Kestell Cornish (13 October 1931 – 26 January 1982) was consecrated 19 May 1979 at St George's Cathedral, Perth, to serve as Assistant Bishop of Perth. He was elected Bishop of Tasmania (to succeed Davies) in 1981, but died suddenly, after moving to Hobart but before his scheduled enthronement; Newell was elected in his stead the same year.
