= Christopher Jones (cricketer) =

English cricketer

Personal information
- Full name: Christopher Jones
- Born: 28 September 1973 (age 53); Stamford, Lincolnshire, England
- Batting: Right-handed
- Bowling: Slow left-arm orthodox

Domestic team information
- Years: Team
- 1999–2006: Cambridgeshire
- 1998: Lincolnshire

Career statistics
Competition	LA
Matches	3
Runs scored	49
Batting average	16.33
100s/50s	–/–
Top score	26
Balls bowled	–
Wickets	–
Bowling average	–
5 wickets in innings	–
10 wickets in match	–
Best bowling	–
Catches/stumpings	–/–
- Source: Cricinfo, 21 July 2010

Christopher Jones (born 28 September 1973) is a former English cricketer. Jones was a right-handed batsman who bowled slow left-arm orthodox. He was born at Stamford, Lincolnshire.

Jones made his debut in county cricket for his home county of Lincolnshire, where he played a single match for them in the 1998 Minor Counties Championship against Bedfordshire at London Road, Sleaford. In 1999, he joined Cambridgeshire, making his Minor Counties Championship debut for the county against Norfolk. From 1999 to 2006, he represented the county in 42 Minor Counties Championship matches, with his final appearance coming against Norfolk.

Jones also represented Cambridgeshire List-A cricket, making his List-A debut against the Warwickshire Cricket Board in the 2001 Cheltenham & Gloucester Trophy. From 2001 to 2004, he represented the county in 3 List-A matches, with his final match in that format coming against Northamptonshire. In his 3 List-A matches, he scored just 49 runs at a batting average of 16.33, with a high score of 26.
