= Anglicare =

Australian community service organisation

Anglicare Australia is the national umbrella community services body of agencies associated with each diocese of the Anglican Church of Australia.

Anglicare is also a brand name under which many Australian Anglican community services agencies operate although they may be separate legal entities.

== Publications ==
Anglicare Australia has been publishing an annual State of the Family report each year since 2000.

- Families as Carers - Families fighting - Economic state of Families, Dr Ann Nevile (2000)
- Economic and Social Exclusion, Dr Ann Nevile, (2001)
- Unemployment and Poverty, Dr Ann Nevile, (2002)
- Children growing up in Poverty, Dr Ann Neville, (2003)
- Missing out: Youth in Australia today, Mark Jeffery, (2004)
- What do Australian Families look like today? (2005)
- Life on a Low Income (2006)
- Not produced 2007
- Creative Tension: Australia's Social Inclusion Agenda (2008)
- Beyond Economics - families in the forefront (2009)
- In From the Edge (2010)
- Staying Power (2011)
- When there’s not enough to eat (2012), 2 volumes
- Paying Attention (2013)
- Being a/part (2014)
- Who is being left behind? (2015)
- Positions Vacant: When the Jobs Aren't There (2016)

Anglicare Australia have released reports on housing and rental affordability issues since 2009, the 2016 Rental Affordability Snapshot (April 2016) received national media coverage.

== See also ==
- Anglican Church of Australia#Welfare and education
