= Frederick Cox =

Frederick Cox may refer to:

- Frederick Cox (priest) (1821–1906), Dean of Hobart
- Frederick Pete Cox (born 1953), American serial killer
- Frederick Cox (cattleman), with Crawford Clarke, owner of Cox & Clark Trading Post and Steamboat Landing
- Fred Cox (1938–2019), NFL kicker for the Minnesota Vikings
- Freddie Cox (1920–1973), English football player and manager
- Fred Cox (1920–2013), British entertainer as part of The Cox Twins
- Fred Cox (politician) (born 1961), Utah politician

== See also ==
- Frederic Cox (1905–1985), British singer, composer and music educator
- Frederick Cocks (disambiguation)
