= James Lowndes Randall =

English investor (1855–1932)

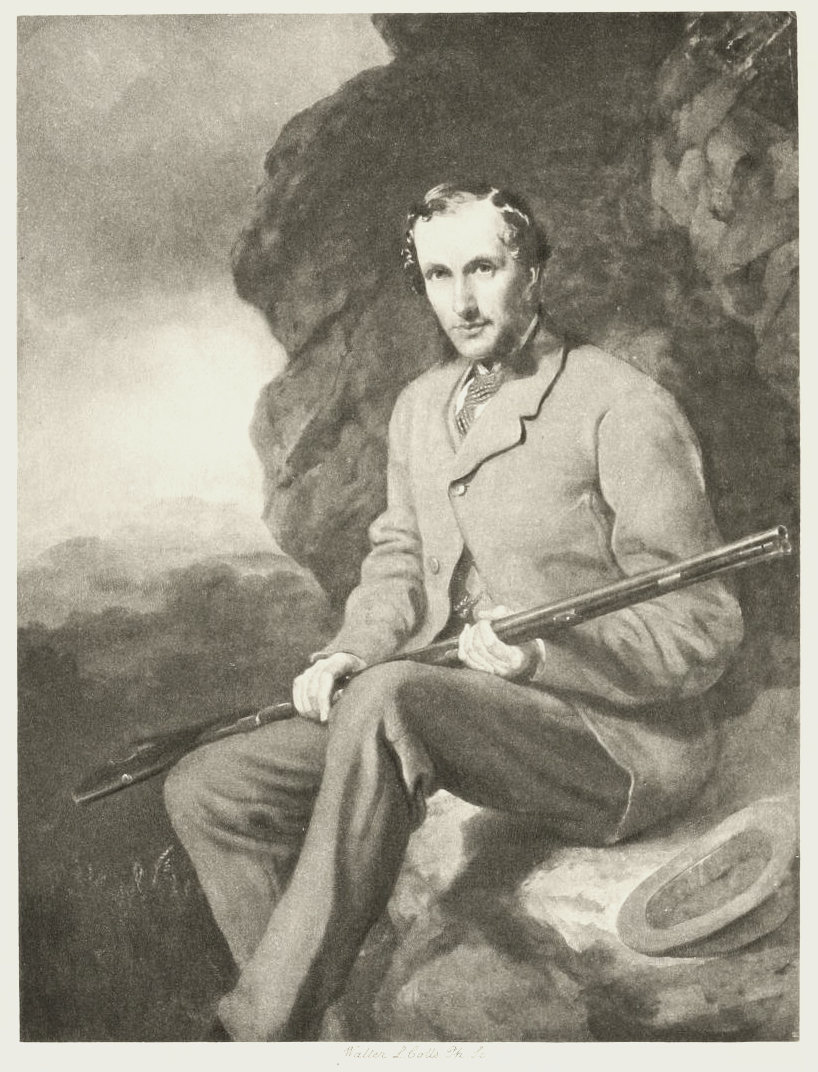
James Lowndes Randall, 1901 portrait from A History of the Meynell Hounds and Country, 1780-1901

James Lowndes Randall (1855–1932) was an English investor in the development of the Gallatin Valley in Montana during the 1880s. In later life he adopted the habits of a country gentleman, and became known for his writings on fox-hunting.

== Background and early life ==
He was the third son of Richard William Randall and his wife Wilhelmina, daughter of the Russia merchant George Augustus Bruxner, born 6 March 1855 at Graffham. He was educated at Winchester College. He matriculated at St John's College, Oxford in 1873, graduating B.A. at New Inn Hall in 1876, M.A. 1880.

== The Moreland Range Stock Co. ==
Near the existing settlement of Hamilton in the Montana Territory, now in Gallatin County, Montana, a Northern Pacific Railroad stop was created in 1883. English investors in 1884 helped set up a new community they called Moreland at that stop, and the Moreland Range Stock Co. Ltd. The place later became Manhattan, Montana, from 1891 and the arrival of the Manhattan Malting Co. of New York.

In 1883, as the Northern Pacific tracks pushed on west well past Bozeman, Randall arrived in the area with his younger brother Frank (Francis Henry), and a cousin Harry Lowndes. With three American investors, they formed the Moreland Range Stock Co. and in October of that year bought a land subsidy area from Northern Pacific, which became Moreland.

Returning to England, Randall married on 3 September 1884 Elizabeth FitzHerbert, known as Isabel, at St Peter's Church, Bournemouth, the officiant being his father. He financed the trip back to Holdenhurst by mortgaging the house he had purchased at Moreland to his uncle Leslie Randall. The couple crossed the Atlantic first class in early October, took a train from New York via Chicago, and arrived at Moreland towards the end of the month.

James Randall remained in Montana until 1889, by when the company, at one time controlling 7,000 acres (2,800 ha), had been reduced to a shell. Isabel Randall published, as "I. R.", the book A Lady's Ranche Life in Montana (London, 1887), noted for its uncomplimentary remarks about American neighbours and customs, and spent a period back in England in 1887. The company's major line of business was in horse breeding. It sold out to the Manhattan Malting Co. in 1891. The Randalls' house was sold to the brewer Henry Altenbrand at the end of 1890.

== Later life ==
Settling in England, Randall had employment as a land agent for William Wykeham Tyrwhitt-Drake on his estate at Malpas, Cheshire, residing at Malpas and Marchington. Also the estate of the late Sir Oswald Mosley, 4th Baronet in 1917.

A keen fox-hunter, Randall hunted with Cheshire and Derbyshire packs, including the Meynell Hunt. Towards the end of his life he moved south, to Nether Stowey around 1924, and then to Bicknoller. For a short period he hunted with the West Somerset Foxhounds, and the Quantock Staghounds, until constrained by illness to give up hunting. He died at home in Bicknoller on 23 June 1932.

== Works ==
- A History of the Meynell Hounds and Country, 1780–1901 (1901, 2 vol., Sampson Low, Marton & Co., London)

== Family ==
Randall married in 1883 Elizabeth FitzHerbert, daughter of the army officer of the British-Italian legion John Knight FitzHerbert of Twynham, and his wife Arabella Penelope White, and niece of Sir William FitzHerbert, 4th Baronet. The couple's son Basil FitzHerbert Randall was born in England, near Bournemouth, in autumn 1890.

Basil Randall was an Indian Army officer with Skinner's Horse, and married Rena Heslop in Sialkot in 1922. Their daughter Felicity Jane was born in 1929, her father dying shortly afterwards; she was later known as Jane Ewart-Biggs, Baroness Ewart-Biggs.
