= Blackler =

Blackler is a surname shared by several notable people:

- Helen Blackler (1902–1981), British phycologist and museum curator
- Martha Hooper Blackler Kalopothakes (1830–1871), American Protestant missionary to Greece
- Phyl Blackler (1919–1975), New Zealand cricketer
- Stuart Blackler, English Anglican priest
- William Blackler (1827–1896), Australian horse breeder

== See also ==
- Blacklers, a former department store in Liverpool, England
