= Church of All Saints, Clifton =

- All Saints with St John, Clifton
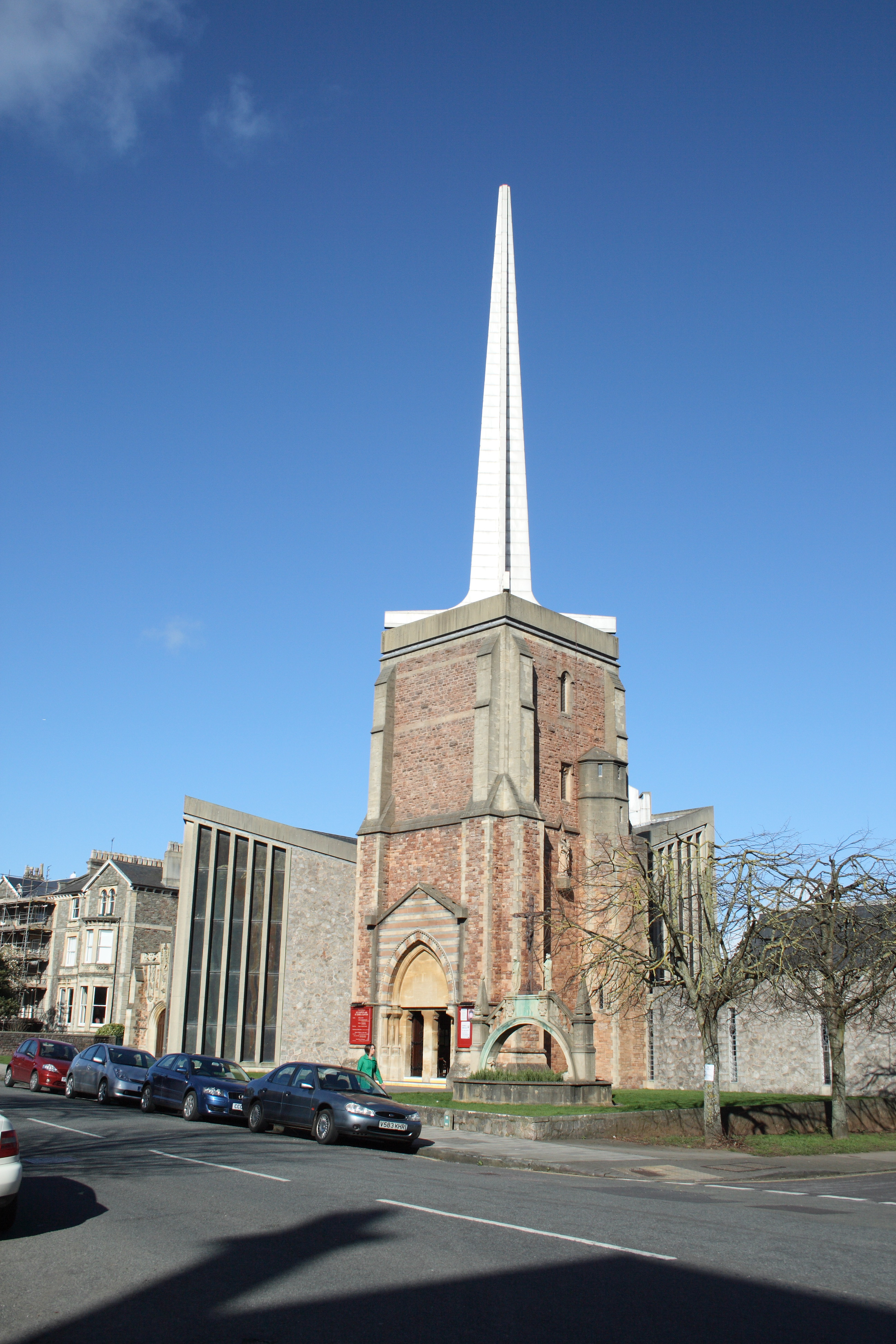
- The old red-brick tower with later concrete extensions

- Church's location in Bristol
- 51.4623°N 2.6161°W
- Location: Pembroke Road, Clifton, Bristol, BS8 2HY
- Country: England
- Denomination: Church of England
- Churchmanship: Anglo-Catholic
- Website: Church website

History
- Status: Active
- Dedication: All Saints
- Consecrated: 8 June 1868 (original); 1 July 1967 (rebuild)

Architecture
- Functional status: Parish church
- Heritage designation: Grade II listed
- Designated: 8 January 1959
- Architect(s): George Edmund Street, George Frederick Bodley, Frederick Charles Eden, Robert Potter
- Style: Gothic Revival, Modernist
- Years built: 1868-72, 1909, 1928, 1963-67

Administration
- Diocese: Diocese of Bristol
- Archdeaconry: Archdeaconry of Bristol
- Deanery: Bristol West
- Parish: All Saints with St. John Clifton

Clergy
- Vicar: Fr Charles Sutton

The Church of All Saints is a Church of England parish church in Clifton, Bristol. The church is a grade II listed building. It is located in the Parish of All Saints with St. John Clifton in the Diocese of Bristol.

== History ==
In 1862, a committee was set up to provide a large church for the Clifton area of Bristol. It would be in the Anglo-Catholic tradition, and would be a free church with no rented pews. The original church was built between 1868 and 1872 by George Edmund Street. The chancel was consecrated on 8 June 1868. A narthex was added in 1909 by George Frederick Bodley, and a sacristy was added in 1928 by Frederick Charles Eden. The narthex houses the Chapel of Saint Richard of Chichester, built as memorial to Richard Randall, the first Vicar of All Saints, who became Dean of Chichester.

On 2 December 1940, an incendiary bomb set fire to the building, destroying the chancel and nave of the church. Only the tower, narthex, and sacristy remained standing. W. H. Randoll Blacking was the architect chosen to reconstruct the church and produced detailed plans. However, after much delay, Blacking died in 1958 before work could begin.

On 8 January 1959, the church was designated a grade II listed building.

In the 1960s, it was once more decided that the rebuilding of the church should go ahead and Robert Potter, Blacking's partner, was selected as the architect. He reorientated the church so that the altar now faces East. Potter united the tower, offices, sacristy and a new church around a cloister entered through the tower. The new lozenge-shaped nave is set to the left of this entrance, incorporating the former narthex as a side chapel dedicated to St Richard, with gallery to the other side. The altar itself is free standing and is set under a ciborium, a four-columned indoor roof.

In 1963 Potter recommended John Piper for the commission to create a set of windows for the new church. The liturgical theme was agreed in 1964, but Piper only executed the work in 1967 during the closing stages of construction. One of Piper's most original commissions, the windows are fabricated from fiberglass panels specifically created by David and Ann Gillespie of Gillespie Associates in Farnham to Piper's specification. Once in situ, Piper poured resin on to the panels creating each coloured section. Piper described the process as akin to painting on canvas. Piper would only use this medium for one other commission, at St Matthew's Church in Southcote, Reading, the following year.

Piper's principal design is seen in the floor-to-ceiling west window. On the left is a golden representation of the River of Life flowing from an urn at the top. To the right is the Tree of Life, with branches that curve upwards and finished with red and yellow fruit. It is bordered with multicoloured stud-like spots. Above the Lady Chapel Piper inserted a large abstract expanse of variegated blue representing Creation. The Sanctuary is flanked by two columns of red reaching the full height of the church. A smaller window behind the Shrine of Our Lady completes Piper's scheme.

The new nave and altar were consecrated on 1 July 1967. The same year, a stained glass window designed by Christopher Webb (another former partner of Blacking) was installed in the east window of the narthex; it was Webb's last window (Webb having died the previous year).

=== Present day ===
In 1978, the parish of All Saints Clifton was joined with that of St John's Clifton to form the Parish of All Saints with St. John Clifton. St John's Church was declared redundant in 1980.

In March 2013, the parochial church council voted to rescind Resolutions A and B, and to rescind the petition for alternative episcopal oversight. With these actions, the parish signalled that it accepts the ordination of women. It remains within the Anglo-Catholic tradition of the Church of England.

== Archives ==
Parish records for the Church of All Saints, Clifton are held at Bristol Archives (Ref. P.St ASC) (online catalogue) including baptism and marriage registers and plans of the remodelling from 1963. The archive also includes records of the incumbent, churchwardens, parochial church council, charities and choir school.

== Notable people ==
- Cedric Bucknall, organist

=== Clergy ===
- Henry Bromby, former vicar, previously Dean of Hobart
- Fabian Jackson, former vicar, later Bishop of Trinidad
- Diarmaid MacCulloch, non-stipendiary deacon from 1987 to 1988, later Professor of the History of the Church at the University of Oxford
- Richard Randall, first vicar from 1868 and 1892, later Dean of Chichester

== Gallery ==
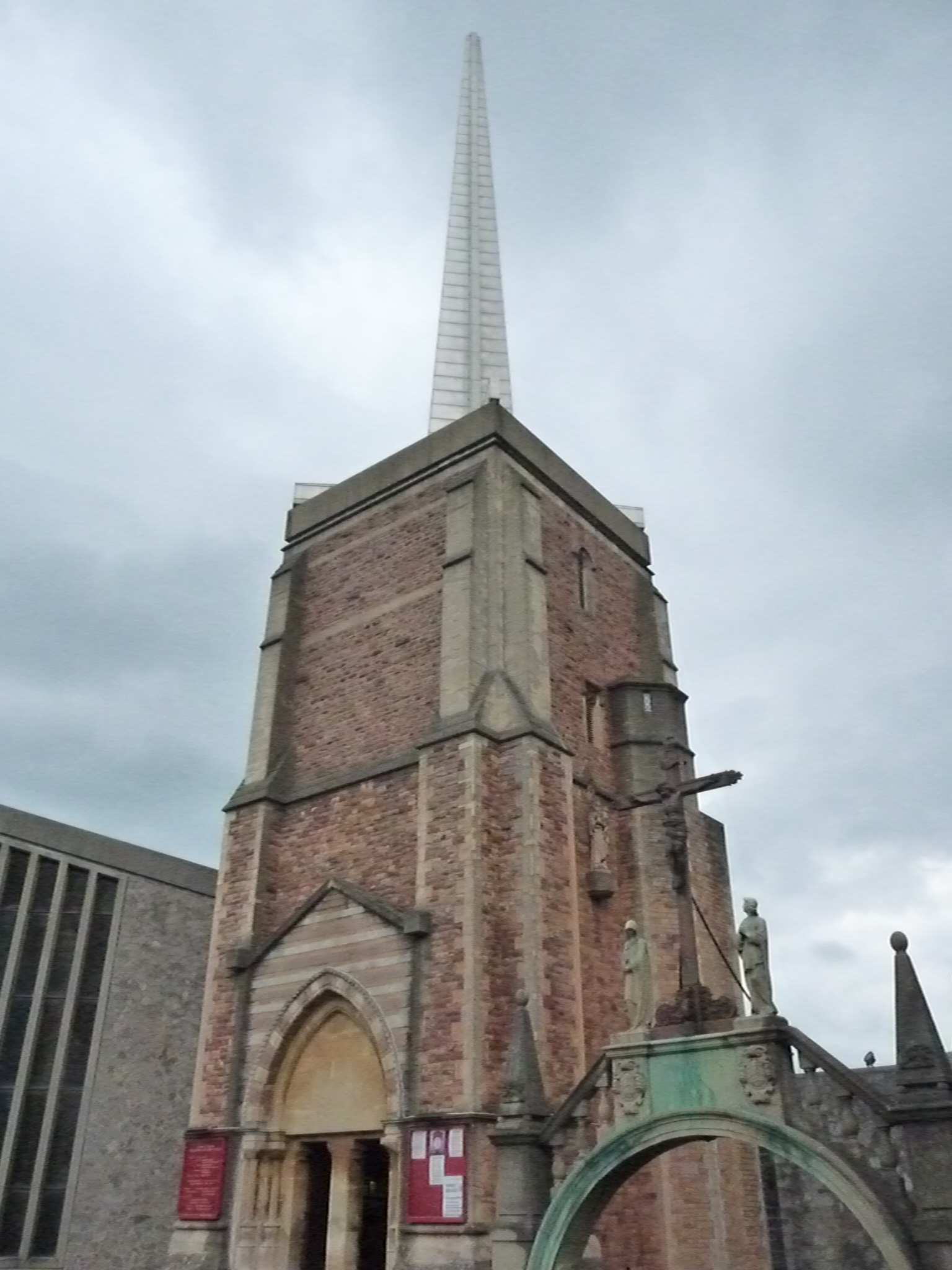
Church tower with spire

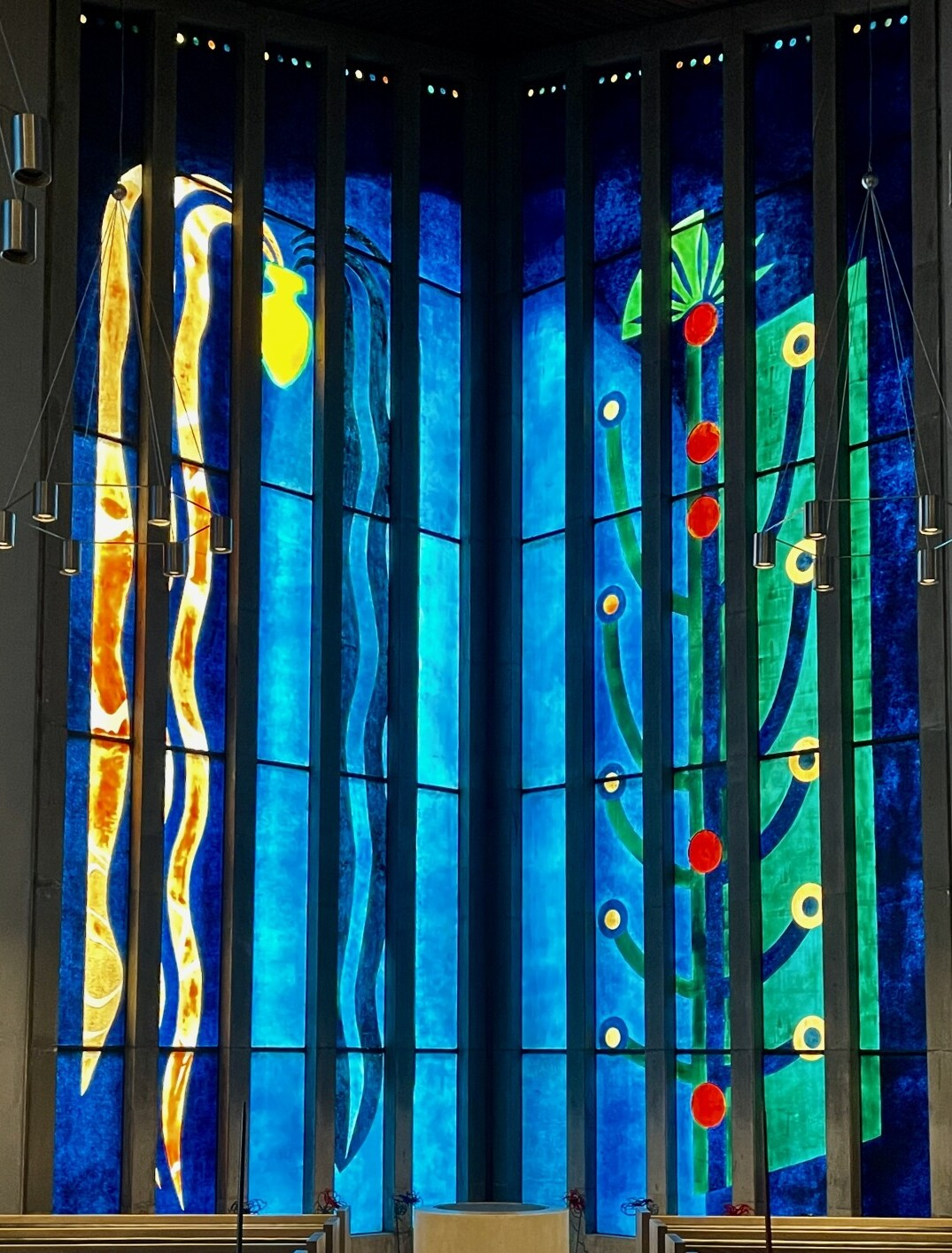
Fibreglass west window by John Piper showing the River of Life and Tree of Life

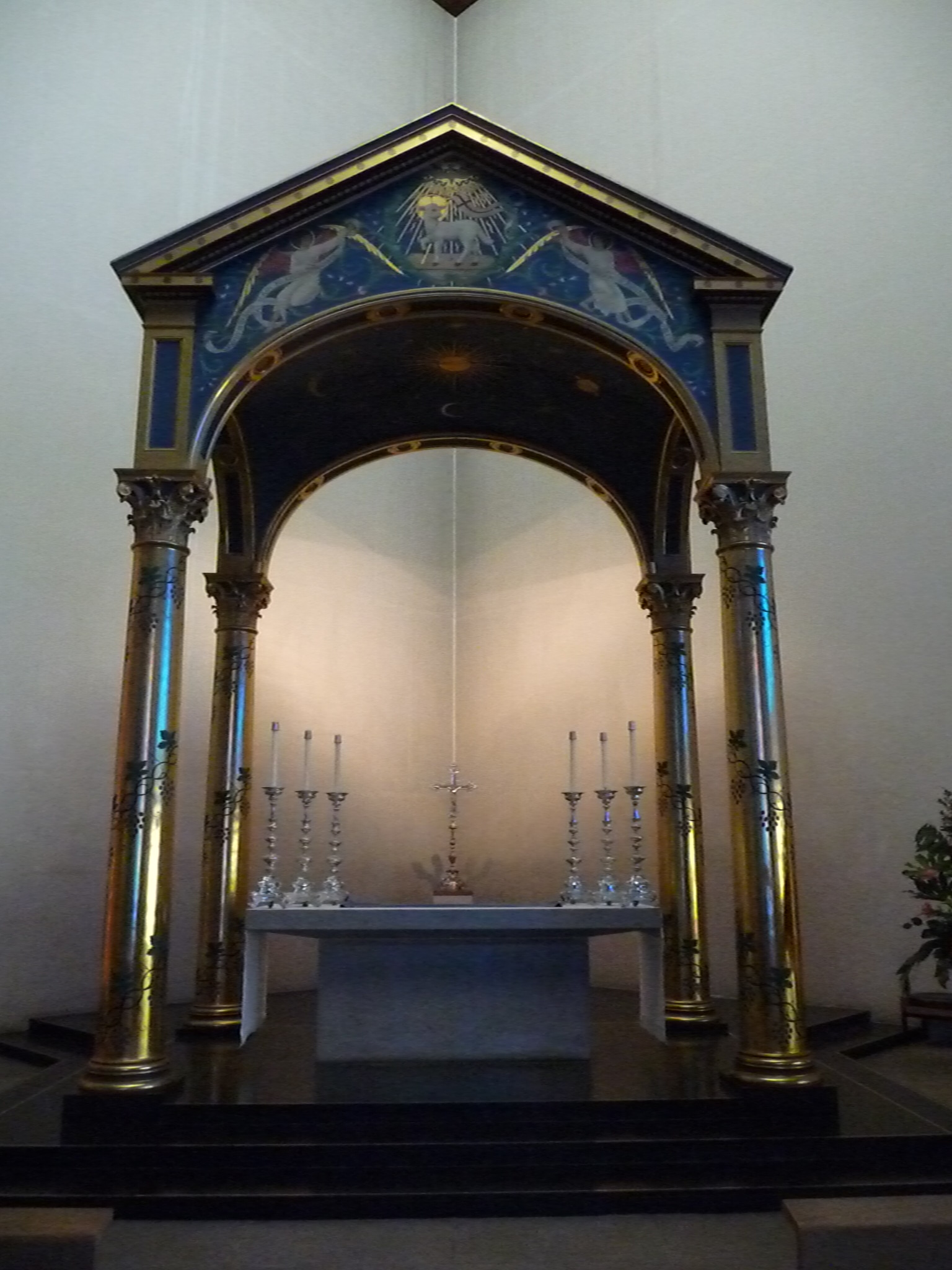
Altar with ciborium

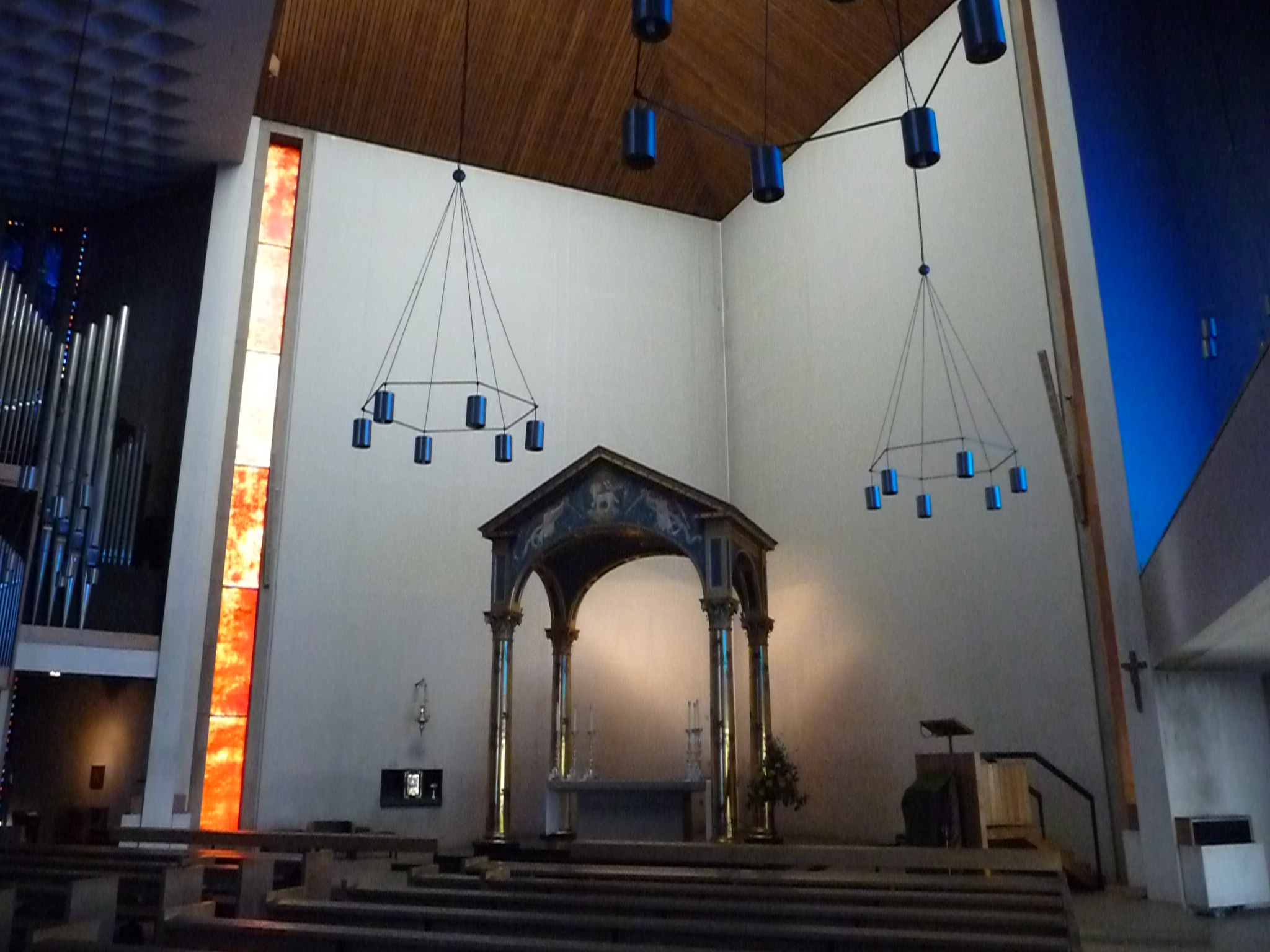
High Altar and Baldachino

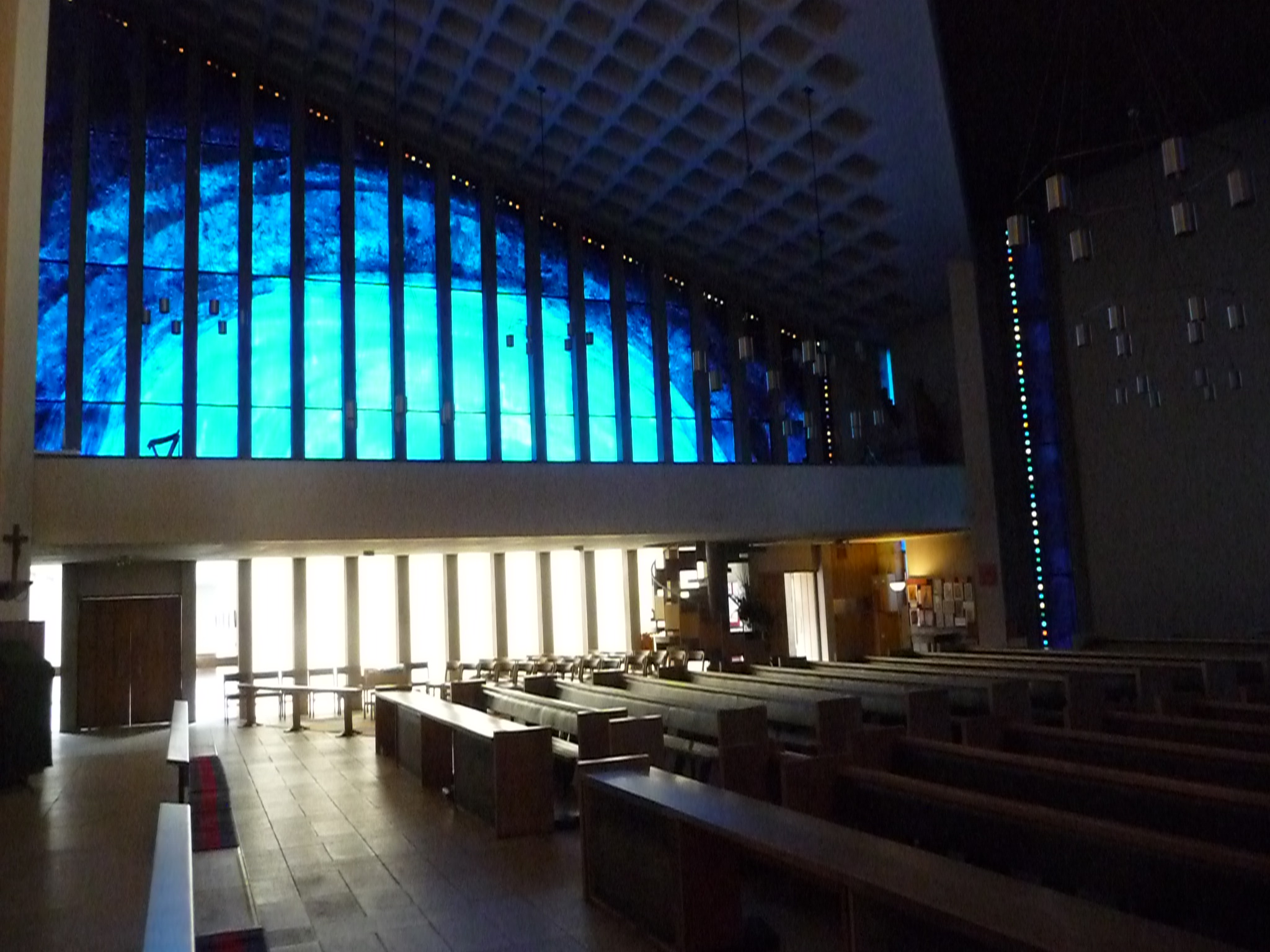
John Piper's fibreglass Creation window above Lady Chapel

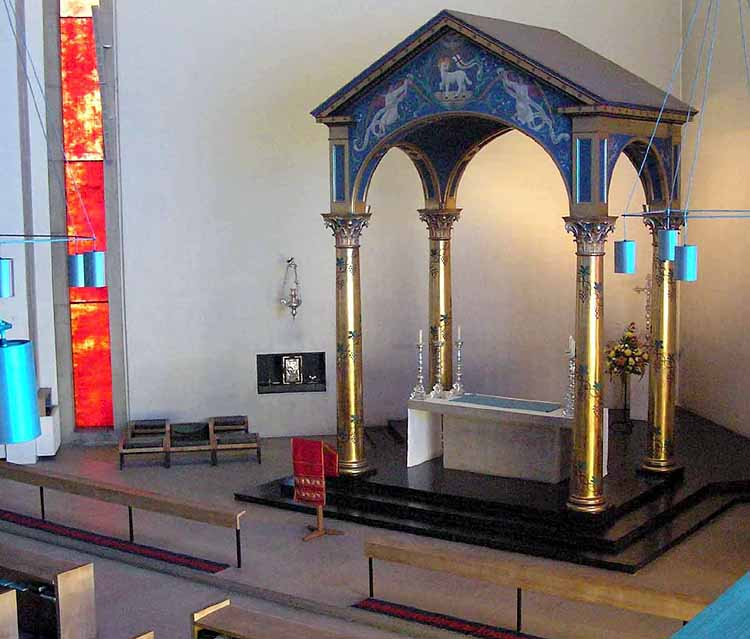
The Chancel with a tabernacle set into the wall

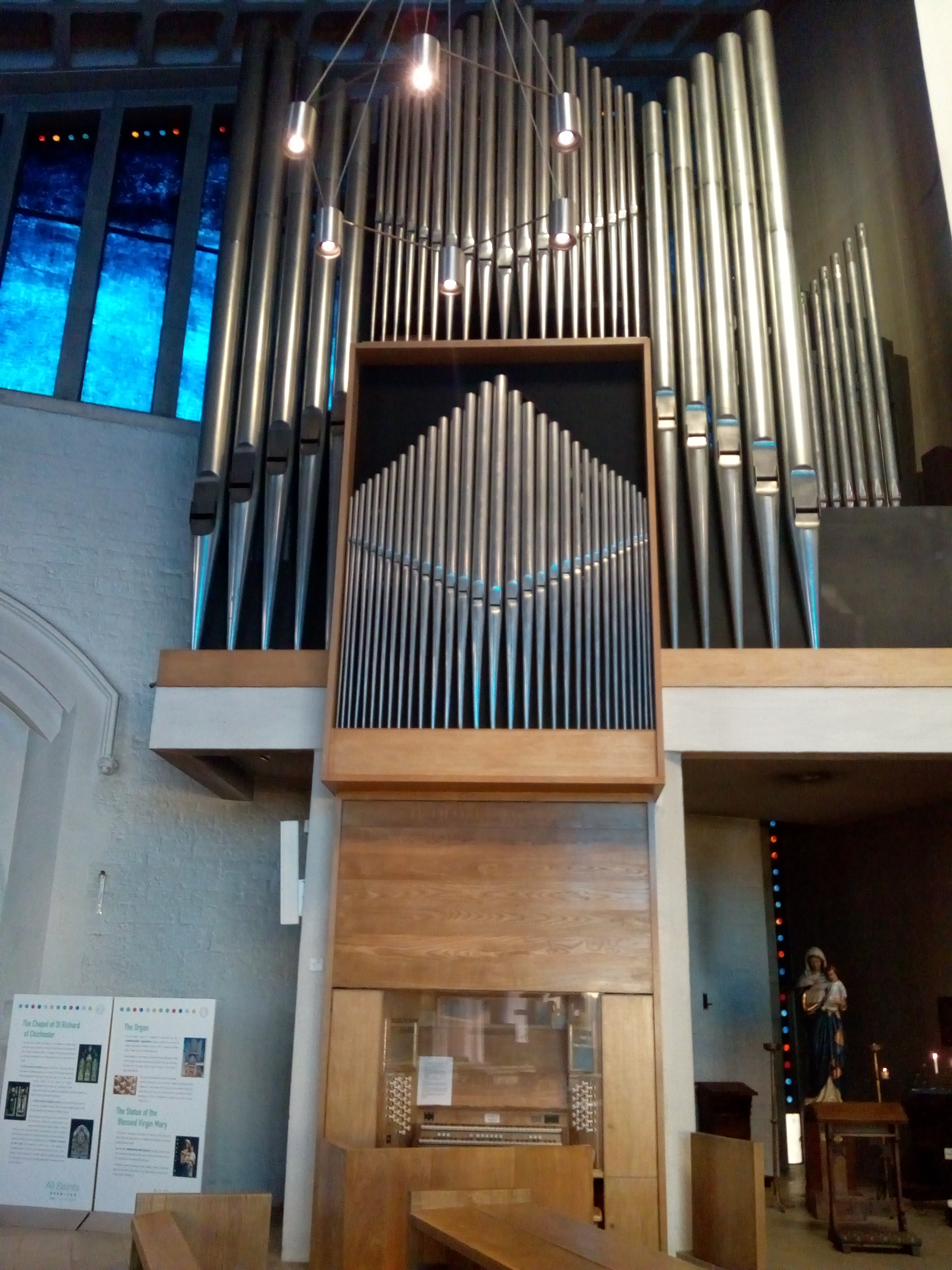
Organ

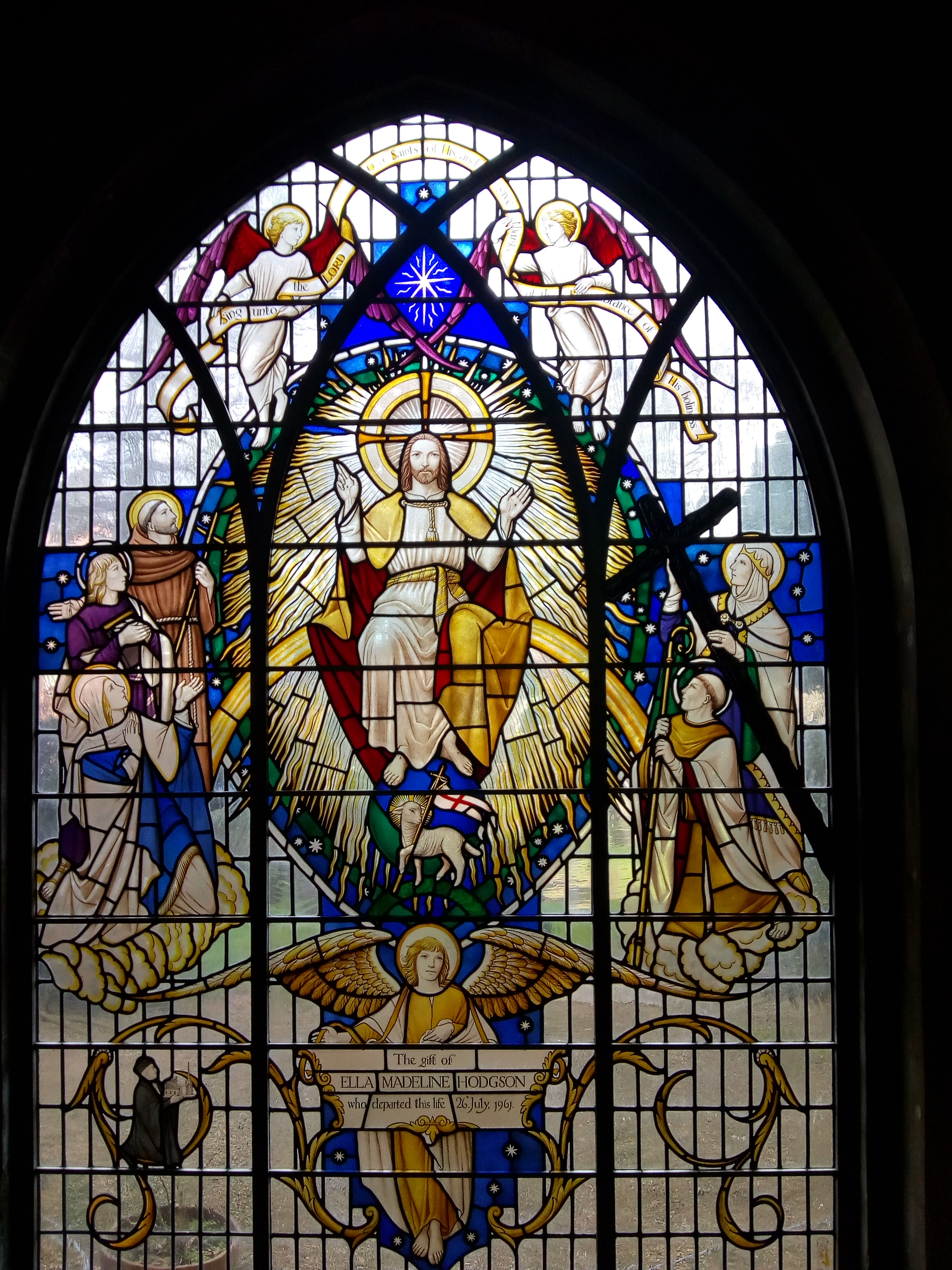
Stained glass window by Christopher Webb

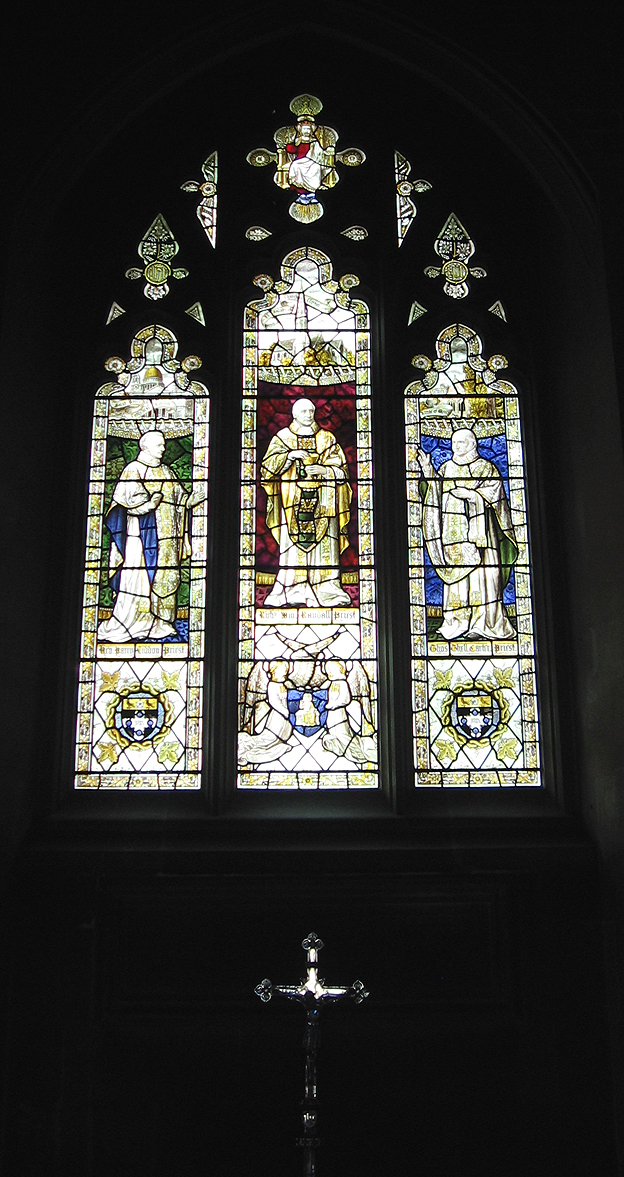
Stained glass window in the narthex

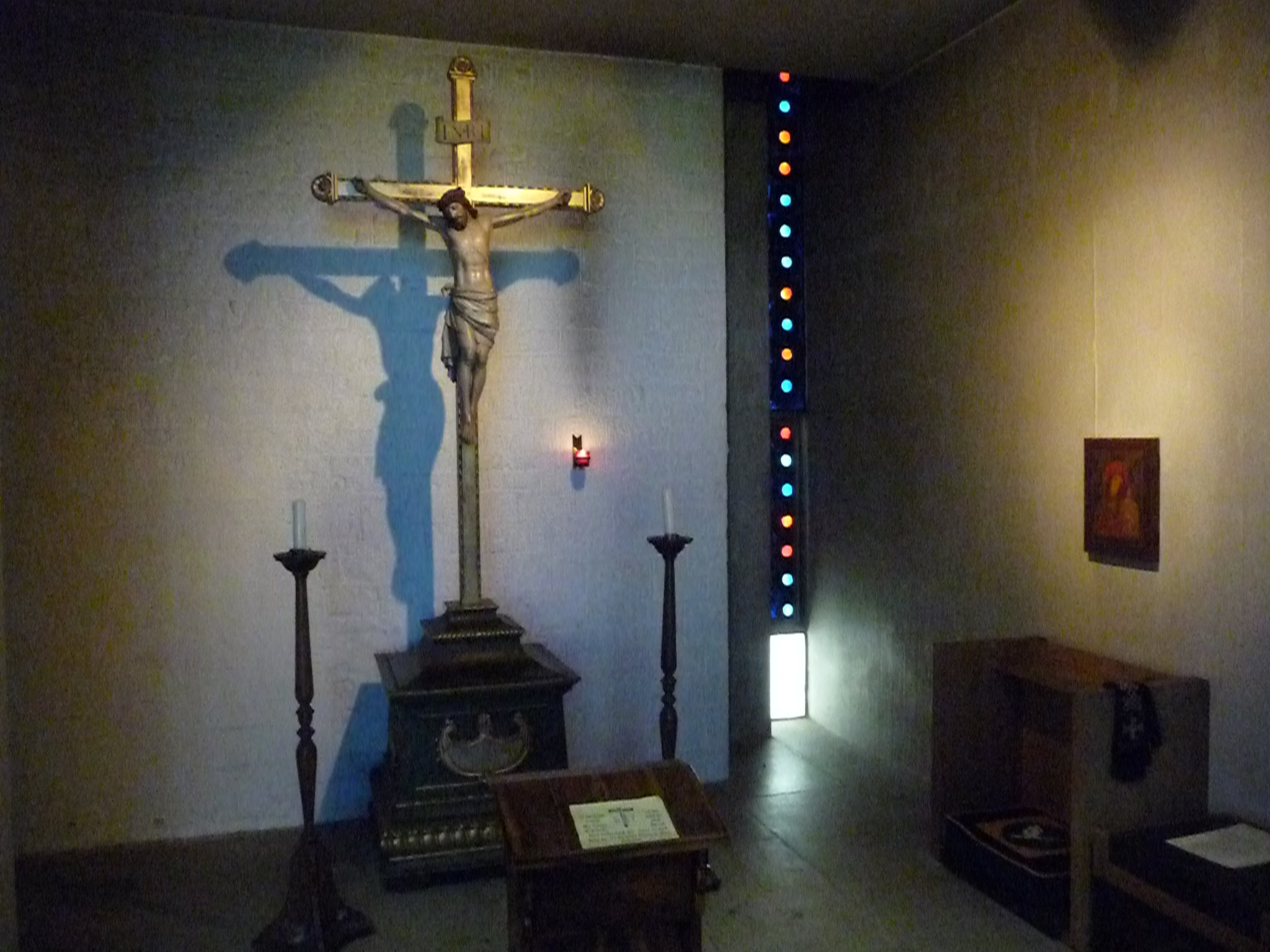
Crucifix
