= Michael Webber (priest) =

Eric Michael Webber AKC (called Michael) was Dean of Hobart from 1959 to 1971.

He trained for the priesthood at King's College London; and was ordained in 1943. He began his career with a curacies in Clapham and Wimbledon. He was the Rector of Eshowe from 1951 to 1956; and of Lapworth with Baddesley Clinton until his appointment as Dean of Hobart.

Religious titles
| Preceded by Percy Fewtrell | Dean of Hobart; 1959–1971 | Succeeded by Harlin Butterley |
