= Percy Fewtrell =

Harold Percy Fewtrell was Dean of Hobart from 1942 to 1958.

He was educated at Bishop Hatfield's Hall and ordained in 1915. He began his career with a curacy in Kennington. Emigrating to Australia he was the Rector of Cessnock, New South Wales from 1921 to 1925. After further incumbencies in Yallourn and Parramatta he was the Head Master at Ballarat Church of England Grammar School for Boys until his appointment as Dean.

He died in 1970.

Religious titles
Preceded by Arthur Richard Rivers	Dean of Hobart; 1942 – 1958	Succeeded by Eric Michael Webber
