= Jeffrey Parsons =

Jeffrey Michael Langdon Parsons (1941–2004) was Dean of Hobart from 1980 to 1983.

He was educated at the University of Wales; and ordained in 1968. He began his career with a curacy in Naracoorte, South Australia. He was the Chaplain of Bancroft's School in Redbridge, London from 1972 to 1975; Rector of Lambourne in Essex, UK from 1975 to 1978; and Chaplain of St Peter's College, Adelaide from 1978 until his appointment as Dean.

Religious titles
| Preceded by Harlin John Lascelles Butterley | Dean of Hobart; 1980 – 1983 | Succeeded by Kenneth Nash Reardon |
