= Frederick Cocks =

Frederick Cocks may refer to:

- Frederick Seymour Cocks, (1882–1953), British Labour Party Member of Parliament
- Frederick C. Hicks, originally Frederick Hicks Cocks (1872–1925), U.S. Representative from New York

== See also ==
- Frederick Cox (disambiguation)
