= John Hannah (dean of Chichester) =

John Julius Hannah (8 May 1844 – 1 June 1931) was an Anglican priest who was Dean of Chichester 1902–1929.

== Biography ==
Hannah was the son of Rev. John Hannah, who had a distinguished career as clergyman in Brighton, and Anne Sophia Gregory (sister of Dr Gregory, Dean of St Paul's), and was born in 1843. He was educated at Trinity College, Glenalmond and Balliol College, Oxford, and ordained Deacon in 1867 after a period of study at Ripon College Cuddesdon.

Two years later he was ordained Priest and received his first post as curate of Brill, Buckinghamshire (1867–1870), he was then curate of Paddington, Middlesex (1870–1871) and curate of Brighton (1871–1873). In 1873 was made Vicar of St Nicholas' Church, Brighton (succeeding his father). Then in 1888 he was appointed Vicar and Rector of Brighton (St Peter's Church, Brighton), again succeeding his father, and thus occupied the chief position among Brighton clergy. He was also appointed rector of West Blatchington (1888–1902). He became at the same time Prebendary of Hove Ecclesia in Chichester Cathedral, and from 1895 Proctor in Convocation for the clergy of the archdeaconry of Lewes. He also served as Rural Dean of Lewes Division V (1889–1902) and as the chairman of Brighton and Preston School Board (1887–1901).

In January 1902 he was appointed Dean of Chichester, a post he held for 27 years.

== Death ==
He died on 1 June 1931, at his family home 'Philpots', near East Grinstead. By his request he was his buried with his wife, at West Hoathly. He left £28,072 1d in his will.

Church of England titles
Preceded by Richard William Randall	Dean of Chichester; 1902 – 1929	Succeeded by Arthur Stuart Duncan Jones
