= Stuart Blackler =

Anglican dean

The Very Reverend Stuart Blackler OAM
- Dean of Hobart
- Church: Anglican Church of Australia
- Diocese: Tasmania
- In office: 1993–2005
- Predecessor: Kenneth Nash Reardon
- Successor: Lindsay Stoddart

Personal details
- Born: Stuart Edward Blackler

Stuart Edward Blackler is a retired Australian Anglican priest who served as Dean of Hobart from 1993 to 2005.

He was educated at the University of Melbourne; and ordained in 1967. He began his career with curacies in Melbourne, South Yarra and Geelong. After an incumbency at Nunawading, Victoria he became a teacher at Melbourne Girls Grammar School.

Blackler was awarded the Medal of the Order of Australia in the 2023 King's Birthday Honours for "service to the Anglican Church of Australia".

Religious titles
Preceded by Kenneth Nash Reardon	Dean of Hobart; 1993 – 2005	Succeeded by Lindsay Stoddart
