= Arthur Rivers =

Anglican dean

Arthur Richard Rivers (1857–1940) was Dean of Hobart from 1920 to 1940.

Twas in the time that Caesar ruled 1911 by Arthur Rivers
MIDI version

== Early life ==
Rivers was born in Teignmouth and educated at St John's College, Oxford. His younger brother was Richard Godfrey Rivers, an artist and gallery curator.

== Religious life ==
Ordained in 1882 Rivers began his career with a curacy in Painswick. Emigrating to Australia he was Precentor of Sydney Cathedral and Chaplain to the Primate of Australia. Moving to Queensland he was Rector of St Michael, Brisbane and then St Andrew in the same city. He was Archdeacon of Burnett and Wide Bay from 1896 to 1905; and of Toowoomba from then until his appointment as Dean of Hobert.

== Later life ==
Rivers died on 1 November 1940.

Religious titles
Preceded by Robert Hay	Dean of Hobart; 1920 – 1940	Succeeded by Percy Fewtrell
