= Arthur Duncan-Jones =

British Anglican priest (1879–1955)

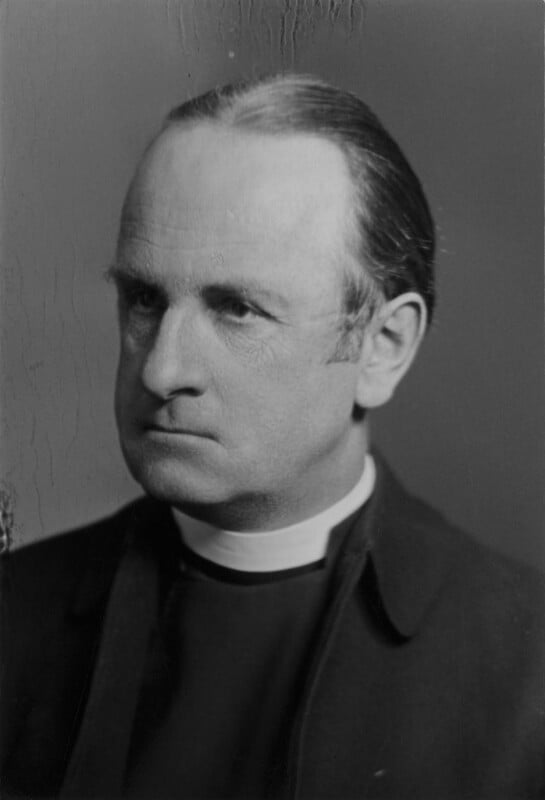
Duncan-Jones in 1944

Arthur Stuart Duncan-Jones (25 April 1879 – 19 January 1955) was an Anglican priest and author in the first half of the 20th century.

Arthur Duncan-Jones was the son of another priest, Duncan Llewellyn Davies Jones, curate of Willoughby, Lincolnshire. Educated at Pocklington School and Gonville and Caius College, Cambridge, he was ordained in 1912. He held the College living at Blofield from 1912 until 1915 when he became Rector of Louth. He held further incumbencies at St Mary's, Primrose Hill, and St Paul's, Knightsbridge, before being elevated to the Deanery at Chichester Cathedral in 1929. He held this post until his death on 19 January 1955.

He was father of the philosopher Austin Duncan-Jones and journalist Vincent Stuart Duncan-Jones, who served as General Secretary of the British Peace Committee (the British section of the World Peace Council) from 1950 to 1954, and went to Vienna in 1954 as part of the Secretariat of the World Peace Council.

== Works ==
- Ordered Liberty, 1917
- Church Music, 1920
- The Aumbry and Hanging Pyx, 1925.
- Archbishop Laud, 1927
- A Good Friday Service, 1928
- Story of Chichester Cathedral, London: Raphael Tuck & Sons, 1933
- The Struggle for Religious Freedom in Germany, 1938
- From U-Boat to Concentration Camp, 1938
- The Crooked Cross, 1940
- The Soul of Czechoslovakia, 1941
- Witness in the Post-War World, 1946
- The Chichester Customary, 1948

Church of England titles
Preceded by John Hannah	Dean of Chichester; 1929 – 1950	Succeeded by Walter Hussey
