= St Matthew's Church, Southcote =

- Church of St Matthew
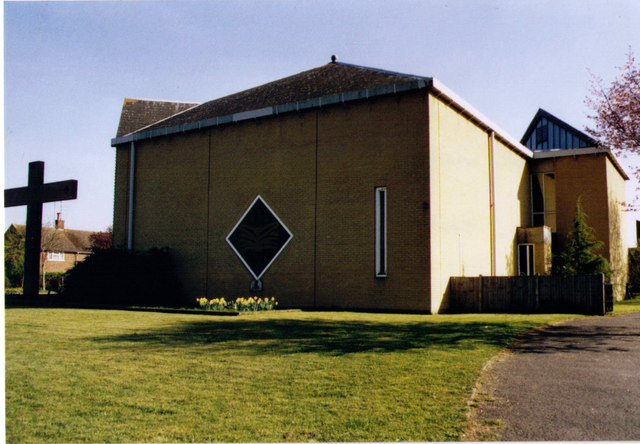
- St Matthew's Church, Southcote
- 51.4411557°N 1.0112149°W
- OS grid reference: SU 68819 71814
- Country: England
- Denomination: Church of England

History
- Status: Active
- Consecrated: 1967

Architecture
- Functional status: Parish church
- Architect: Sir Basil Spence
- Architectural type: Modernist
- Years built: 1965–1967

Administration
- Diocese: Oxford
- Archdeaconry: Berkshire
- Deanery: Reading
- Parish: Reading, St. Matthew

St Matthew's Church is a Church of England parish church located in the suburb of Southcote in Reading, Berkshire. Dedicated to Matthew the Apostle, it is administered as part of the Reading Deanery in the Diocese of Oxford. Designed by Scottish architect Sir Basil Spence, the church is notable for its distinctive modernist architecture and innovative use of materials.

== History ==
Southcote, on Reading's south-western outskirts, was first developed by the local authority after the Second World War to satisfy demand for new housing. A simple church hall was built in 1954 to serve the newly created parish. However, in 1962 or 1963, renowned architect Sir Basil Spence - who had only recently completed the rebuilding of Coventry Cathedral - was asked to produce designs for a more distinguished structure. After Spence's initial plan was rejected on cost grounds he reworked his design to suit the modest budget of £20,000. These were approved in 1965 and construction was completed in 1967.

== Architecture ==
Spence's design features a brick-built square nave with a smaller, projecting chancel at the southwest corner. This layout creates an intersecting plan that angles the congregation towards the altar. The nave walls taper subtly towards the chancel, and concealed skylights and windows provide additional natural light. An aluminium space frame supports the roof without the need for internal columns, a feature that was innovative for its time.

Spence's original aluminium nave roof was almost flat and completely concealed, with a trapezoidal form over the chancel. The roof later failed structurally and was replaced in the 1990s with a more conventional pitched and tiled roof. This allowed a taller pentagonal window to be inserted at the north-east elevation.

The north and east elevations feature large lozenge-shaped windows designed by John Piper. Spence, who had worked with Piper at Coventry Cathedral, commissioned him directly. Installed in 1968, the two windows both feature simple abstract forms to their centre with a pattern suggestive of leaves or wings. The north wall window is yellow/green with red detail, while the east wall window is white with blue detail. Both are framed with borders of multicoloured dots.

Undertaken shortly after Piper's commission at Church of All Saints, Clifton, this was the second and final time he collaborated with David and Ann Gillespie of David Gillespie Associates to make use of the highly unusual medium of coloured resin on fibreglass to realise his window designs. Fabricated in Farnham to Piper's specification, once in situ, Piper poured resin on to the panels to create the coloured pattern. Piper described the process as akin to painting on canvas.

The external concrete cross that stands in front of the north elevation is an original feature and part of Spence's architectural plan. It originally stood in an ornamental pond, which has since been drained and filled.

== Gallery ==
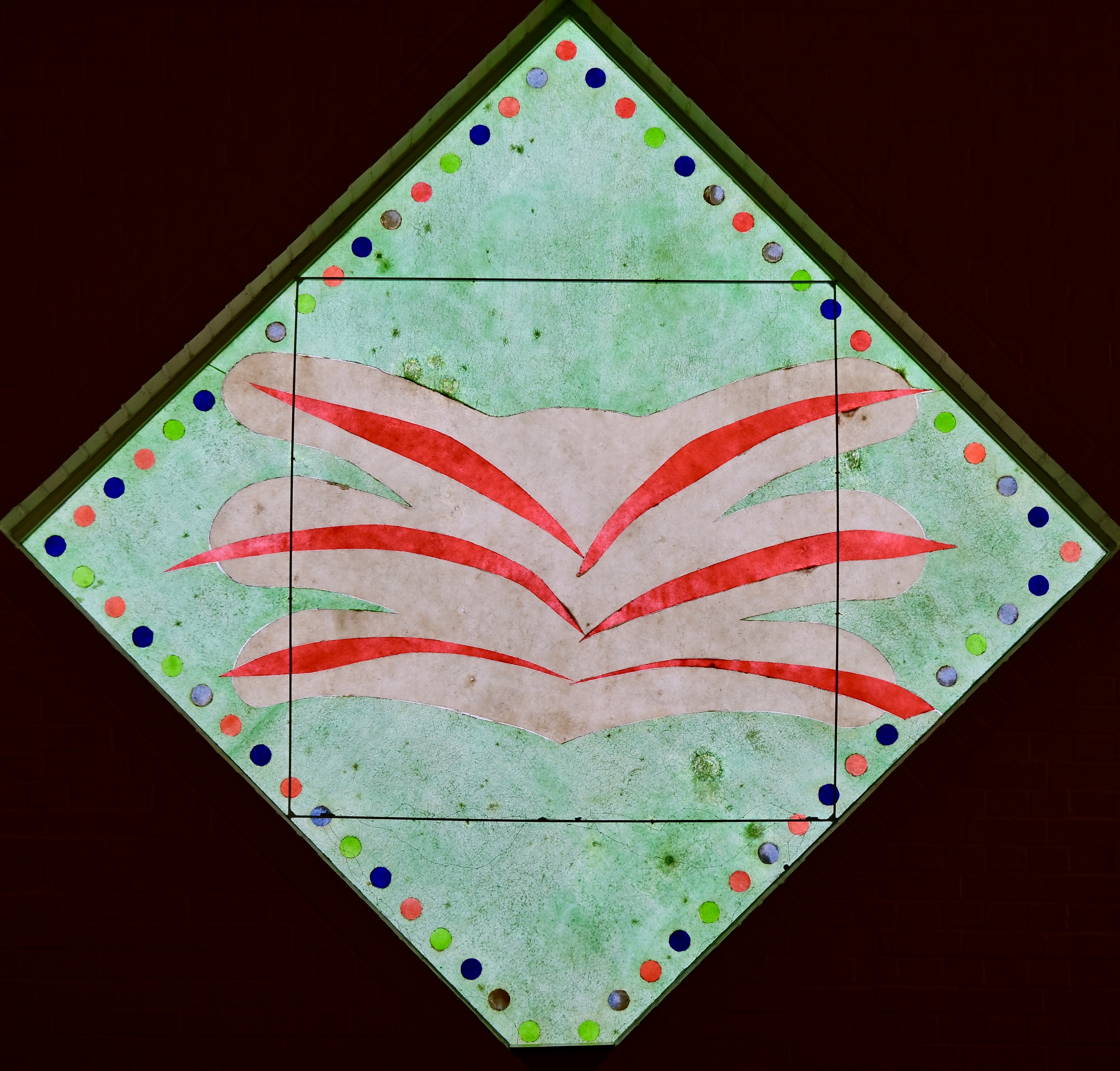
Fibreglass window by John Piper in north wall

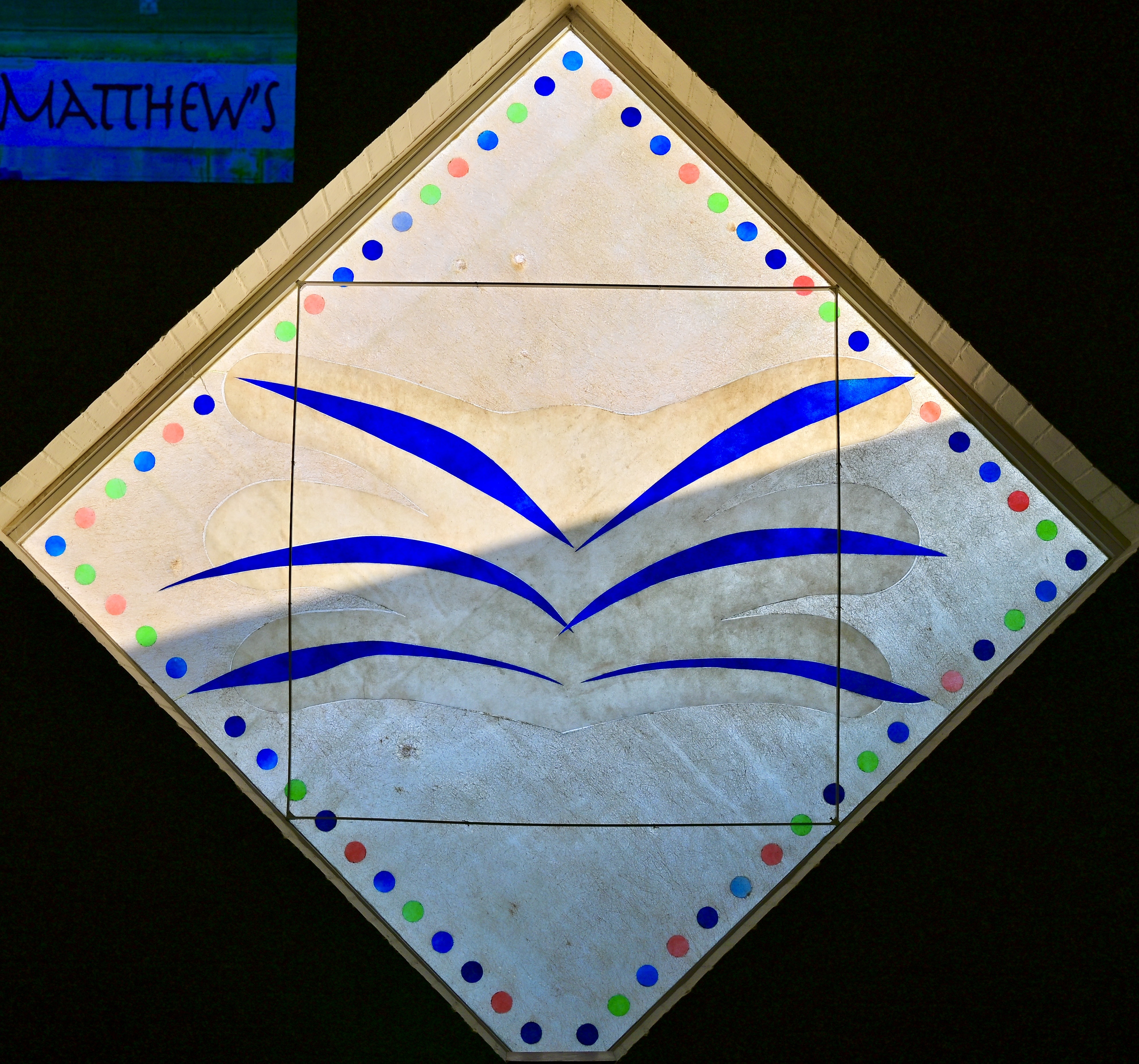
Fibreglass window by John Piper in east wall
