= Lindsay Stoddart =

Lindsay Stoddart was the thirteenth Dean of Hobart, serving from 2006 to 2008.

Stoddart was educated at Fuller Theological Seminary and the University of Sheffield. He had ministered in three parishes, set up the Anglican Youthworks in Sydney and been the Archdeacon of Wollongong before his cathedral appointment.

Religious titles
| Preceded by Kenneth Nash Reardon | Dean of Hobart; 2006 – 2008 | Succeeded by Richard Charles Humphrey |
