= Henry Bromby =

Henry Bodley Bromby (1840-1911) was the second Dean of Hobart, serving from 1877 to 1884.

== Early life and education ==
Bromby was born into an ecclesiastical family. He was educated at Jesus College, Cambridge.

== Ordained ministry ==
Bromby was ordained in 1864 He was Canon of St David's Cathedral, Hobart from 1865 to 1868, and 1870 to 1877; incumbent of St. Johns, Hobart, from 1868 to 1873; incumbent of the cathedral parish of Hobart from 1873 to 1884; and Dean until his return to England, where he was Vicar of St Peter, Coggeshall then St. John the Evangelist, Bethnal Green (also Rural Dean of Spitalfields) and finally Vicar of All Saints, Clifton.

He died on 20 December 1911. He is buried in the churchyard of St George's Church, Easton-in-Gordano. His grave is marked by a cross with a figure of Jesus.

Religious titles
Preceded by Frederick Holdship Cox	Dean of Hobart; 1877 – 1884	Succeeded by Charles Leslie Dundas
