= Richard Humphrey (priest) =

Anglican Dean of Hobart, Tasmania

Richard Charles Humphrey is the current dean of Hobart in Tasmania, Australia.

Humphrey was born in London, and was educated at The Friends' School, Hobart, the University of Sydney, Moorlands Bible College, and Moore Theological College.

Religious titles
Preceded by Lindsay Stoddart	Dean of Hobart; 2008 –	Succeeded by Current incumbent
