= Harlin Butterley =

Harlin John Lascelles Butterly (1927–2012) was Dean of Hobart from 1972 to 1980.

He was educated at Moore College in Sydney, Australia, and was ordained in 1951. He began his career with curacies at Narrabeen and Mascot, both located near Sydney. He was the general secretary of the CMS in Tasmania from 1954 to 1957; and a chaplain at St Stephen's College, Hong Kong for a decade after that. From 1971 until his appointment as dean he was a chaplain to the Forces.

From 1980 to 1993, he was vicar at St Andrew's Church, Brighton. He retired in March 1993 and in semi-retirement, he became a popular after-dinner speaker and wrote a number of books, both during and after his time at Brighton.

Butterley died on January 6, 2012, in a nursing home in Hobart at the age of 84.

Religious titles
Preceded by Eric Michael Webber	Dean of Hobart; 1972 – 1980	Succeeded by Jeffrey Michael Langdon Parsons
