= St David's Cathedral, Hobart =

Anglican cathedral in Hobart, Tasmania, Australia

St David's Cathedral
- Cathedral Church of St David
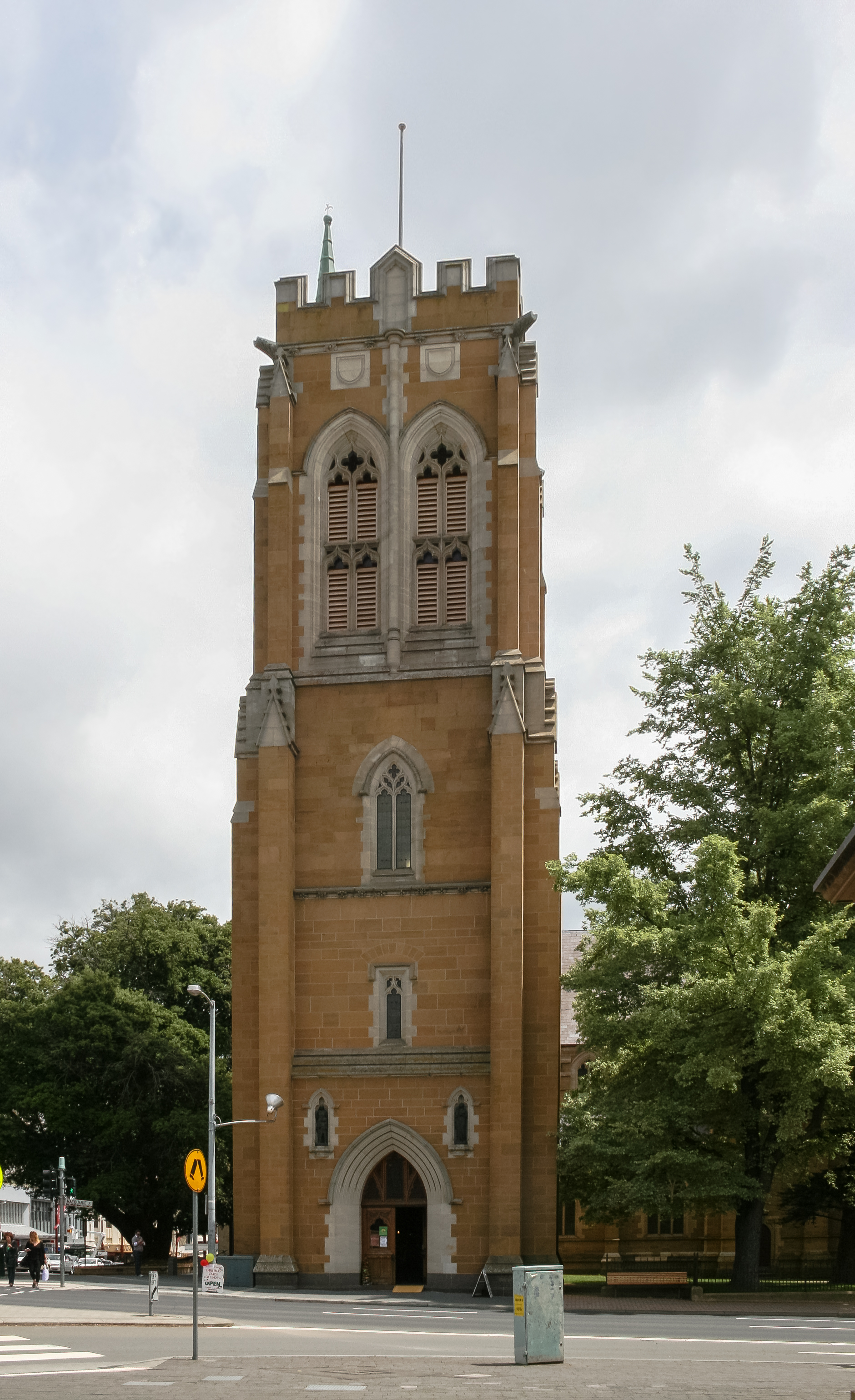
- St David's Cathedral from Macquarie Street
- St David's Cathedral
- 42°53′01″S 147°19′43″E
- Address: Corner Macquarie and Murray Streets, Hobart, Tasmania
- Country: Australia
- Denomination: Anglican
- Website: saintdavids.org.au

History
- Status: Cathedral (since 1848)
- Founded: January 1868
- Founder: Prince Alfred, Duke of Edinburgh
- Dedication: Saint David
- Consecrated: 1874

Architecture
- Architect: George Frederick Bodley
- Architectural type: Church
- Style: Gothic Revival
- Years built: 1868 – 1936

Administration
- Diocese: Tasmania

Clergy
- Bishop: Richard Condie
- Dean: Richard Humphrey

The Cathedral Church of St David is the Anglican cathedral church located in Hobart, Tasmania, Australia. The cathedral is the mother-church for the Diocese of Tasmania. Consecrated in 1874, St David's is the seat of the Bishop of Tasmania, currently the Right Reverend Richard Condie. The dean is the Very Reverend Richard Humphrey.

== History ==
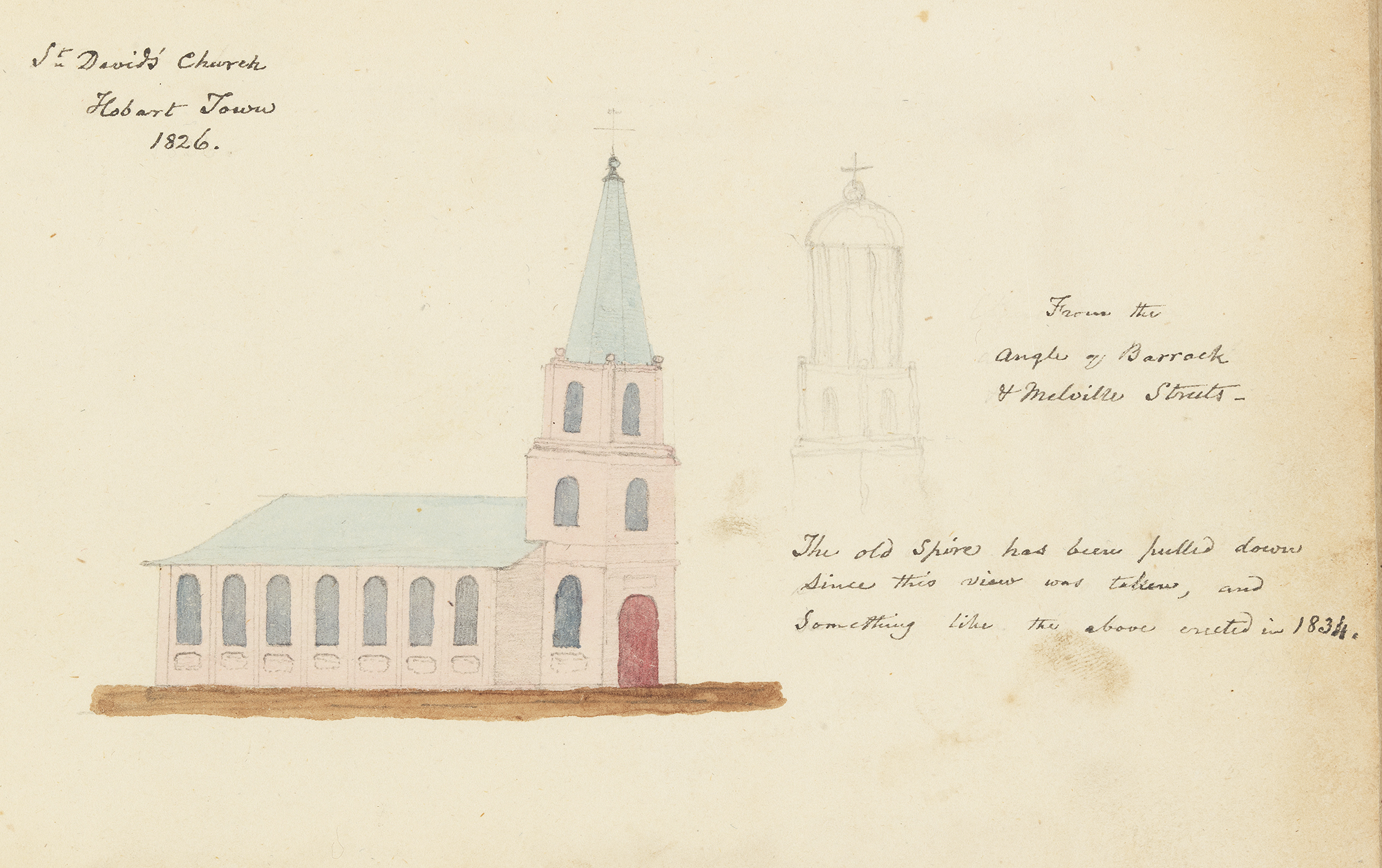
St David's Church, Hobart, Tasmania, 1826, Thomas Scott

In 1842 Hobart was declared a city and the existing St David's Church became St David's Cathedral. The Reverend Francis Russell Nixon was appointed first Bishop of Tasmania and Frederick Holdship Cox the first Dean of St David's.

The foundation stone of a new cathedral was laid in January 1868 by Prince Alfred, Duke of Edinburgh, a son of Queen Victoria, and it was built between then and 1936, in the Gothic Revival style, to a design by the English architect George Frederick Bodley. There are flags dating from the time when Tasmania stopped being a convict settlement. The stained-glass windows depict saints, knights, kings and biblical characters. Small memorial plaques along the walls are dedicated to deceased residents of Tasmania.

The cathedral's distinctive features include an arcaded entrance with a large west window and buttressed turrets; a square tower made of Oatlands stone; and a close on the southern side with old trees. The building is listed on the now defunct Register of the National Estate.

== Description ==
The building sits on the corner of Macquarie and Murray Streets and forms one quadrant of what is considered to be the finest Georgian streetscape in Australia. On the pinnacles of each gable is a quatrefoil, repeated on the extremities of the large crucifix of the rood screen which dominates the sanctuary.

The cathedral choir offers sacred music both classical and contemporary in worship and in concert. The organ, considered one of the superior organs of Australia, which was originally in the earlier cathedral, was a two-manual made by Bishop & Starr of London. Expanded in 1916 to a three-manual by George Fincham & Sons of Melbourne, it was rebuilt again in 1958 by J. W. Walker & Sons Ltd of London, and renovated between 1999 and 2005 by Gibbs & Thomson. The acoustics and 650 seating capacity demand frequent concerts. Appearances of the Tasmanian Symphony Orchestra, Hobart City Band, massed military bands, the Royal Copenhagen Chapel Choir and the Sydney Brass Quintet were features of 2008.

The cathedral tower has a peal of 10 bells, with the tenor of 21 long cwt (2,400 lb or 1,100 kg), set for full circle ringing. Most of the bells are from 1935 (with several newer bells installed in 2005) and all were founded by John Taylor & Co. They are rung by members of The Australian and New Zealand Association of Bellringers.

== Mission ==
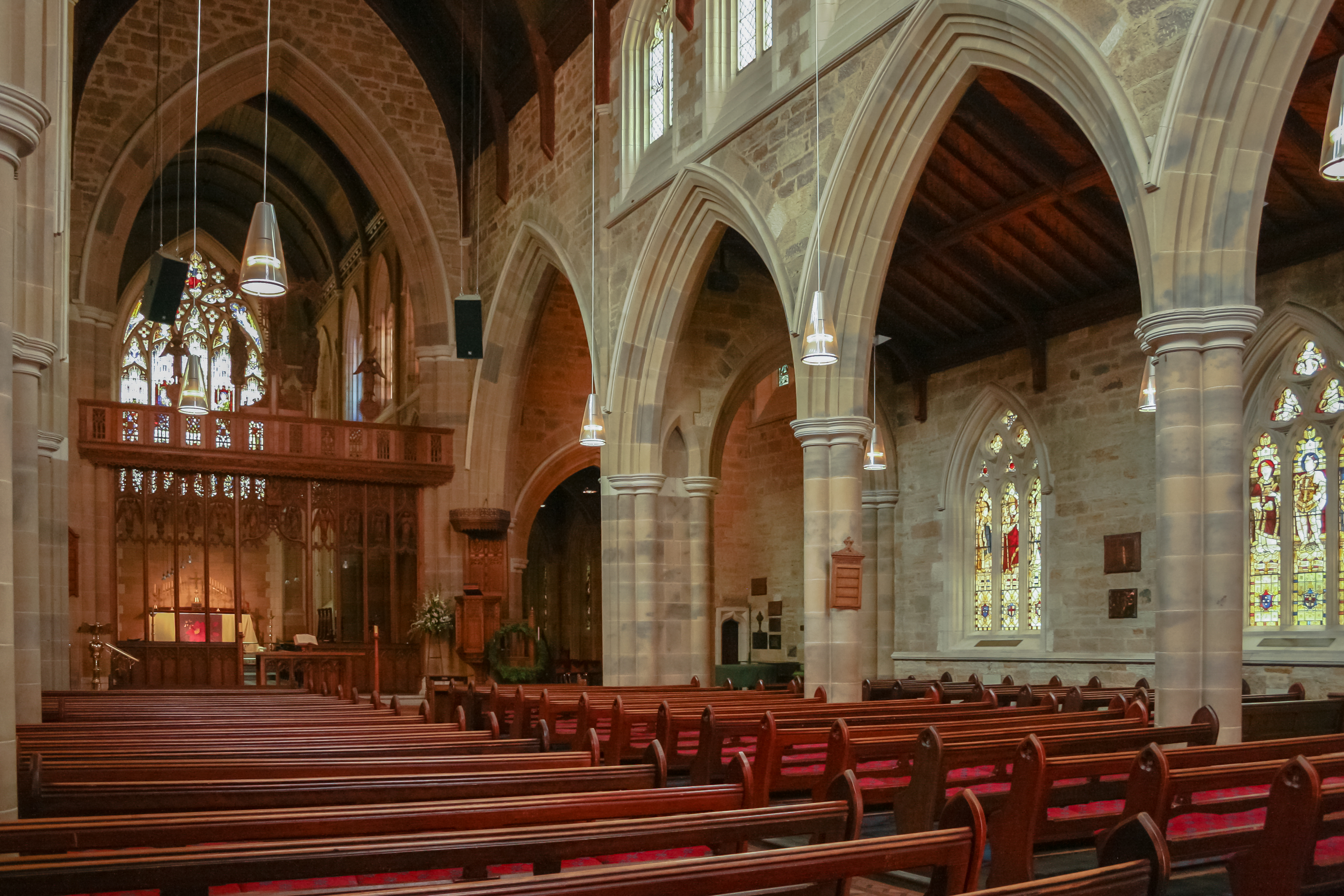
Interior of the cathedral.

The mission of St David's is "Proclaiming Jesus as Lord in the Heart of Hobart to build a community of living faith, profound hope and practical love."

== Liturgy ==
St David's is known for its contemporary Anglican liturgy. Linked with England's Coventry Cathedral, the dean and associate clergy are "committed to creative liturgies that lift the heart and proclaim the Biblical faith as our society, increasingly dissatisfied with a purely materialistic world view, seeks a sense of the transcendent and apprehension of a living spirituality."

This desire for a "living spirituality" is reflected in the cathedral's commitment to serve the city, state and community. In services from those for the opening of law term, the opening of parliament, Heart Foundation, the Cancer Council Tasmania, Battle of Britain, Anzac Day, Hutchins and Collegiate schools and as a venue for state secondary and senior secondary schools the tranquillity and peace is often suspended with laughter, tears and memories.

The memorial service for the Port Arthur tragedy is remembered in the Hope Chapel. A memorial to the last ANZAC soldier, Alec Campbell, who died on 16 May 2002, aged 103, is also in the cathedral.

== Deans ==
The following individuals have served as Dean of St David's Cathedral Parish:

Ordinal	Officeholder name	Term start	Term end	Time in office	Notes
1	Frederick Holdship Cox	1872	1874	1–2 years	
2	Charles Henry Bromby	1874	1876	1–2 years	also Bishop of Tasmania
3	Henry Bodley Bromby	1876	1884	7–8 years	Son of the above
4	Charles Leslie Dundas	1885	1895	9–10 years	
5	Joseph Bertram Kite	1898	1916	17–18 years	
6	Robert Snowdon Hay	1916	1919	2–3 years	
7	Arthur Richard Rivers	1920	1941	20–21 years	
8	Harold Percy Fewtrell	1942	1954	11–12 years	
9	Michael Webber	1959	1971	11–12 years	
10	Harlin Butterley	1972	1980	7–8 years	
11	Jeffrey Parsons	1980	1983	2–3 years	
12	Kenneth Nash Reardon	1984	1993	8–9 years	
13	Stuart Blackler	1993	2005	11–12 years	
14	Lindsay Stoddart	2005	2008	2–3 years	
15	Richard Charles Humphrey	2009	incumbent	16–17 years	

== See also ==
- List of tallest buildings in Hobart
- List of cathedrals in Australia
- St David's Cathedral
