= Richard Randall (priest) =

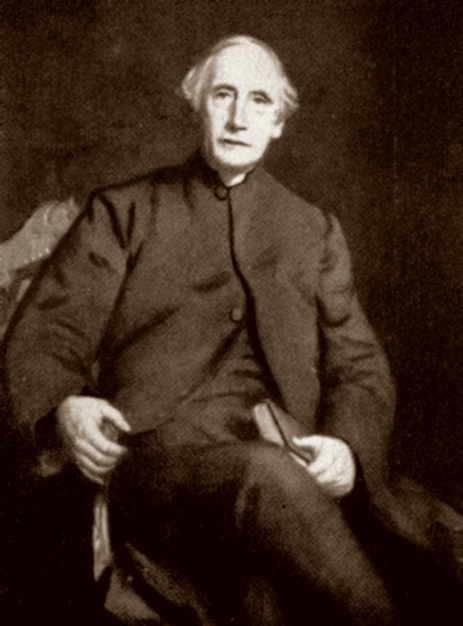
Dean Richard William Randall

Richard William Randall (13 April 1824 – 23 December 1906) was an Anglican priest in the second half of the 19th century and the early part of the 20th.

== Early life ==
Randall was born, into an ecclesiastical family, the eldest son of the Ven. James Randall, in Bloomsbury on 13 April 1824. Richard Randall was first educated at Winchester College, from there he matriculated on 12 May 1842, aged 18 and studied at Christ Church, Oxford. He took his B.A. in 1846 and was awarded his M.A. in 1849. He received the degree of D.D. from his university in 1892.

== Career ==
Randall was ordained in 1847. He was a Curate at St Mary, Binfield, then succeeded Archdeacon Manning (later Cardinal Manning) as Rector of St Mary Magdalene West Lavington, before becoming the first Vicar of All Saints, Clifton, a post he held between 1868 and 1892. While at Clifton he reintroduced the ancient Catholic usages. The principal service on Sunday morning was a Choral Eucharist, presented with all the dignity and solemnity that was possible, but always within the statutes of the Church of England, and the desires of the Bishop.

In 1892 Randall became Dean of Chichester, holding the post for ten years. He found it difficult fitting in with chapter life and when he resigned the deanery in 1901, he wrote to the bishop complaining of the bitter disappointment of these many years.

While dean of Chichester he managed to upset the local citizens; he objected to what he felt was the elaborate music in the cathedral, however the local citizens felt differently and organised a petition asking him to leave the music alone. Also according to the local newspaper he caused great offence by not standing during Handel's Hallelujah chorus. He died, in Bournemouth, on 23 December 1906.

Church of England titles
Preceded by Francis Pigou	Dean of Chichester; 1892 – 1902	Succeeded by John Julius Hannah
