= Frederick Cox (priest) =

Frederick Holdship Cox (1821-1906) was an English priest and the inaugural Dean of Hobart.

== Early life ==
He was born in Walton, Buckinghamshire on 20 April 1821 and educated at Merchant Taylors' School and Pembroke College, Cambridge.

== England and Tasmania ==
He was ordained deacon in 1844 and priest in 1845. His first post was as assistant curate of Iping-cum-Chithurst. He was recruited for service in Tasmania and arrived in February 1846. His first task was to create a new church at Buckland. After this he was Warden of Christ College, Tasmania. He returned to England to be the Curate at Wantage. While there he was nominated to succeed Bishop Colenso of Natal. In 1868 he became the Incumbent of St David's Cathedral, Hobart and in 1872, Dean.

=== Return to England ===
In February 1874 he resigned and returned to England. He was Vicar of Tilney All Saints from 1874 to 1877; Rector of Fen Ditton from 1877 to 1883; Vicar of Elm from 1883 to 1896; and Rural Dean of Wisbech from 1886 to 1896.

He died in Tunbridge Wells on 7 August 1906.

Religious titles
| Preceded by Inaugural appointment | Dean of Hobart; 1872 – 1874 | Succeeded by Henry Bodley Bromby |
