= Kenneth Reardon =

Kenneth Nash Reardon was Dean of Hobart from 1984 to 1992.

He was educated at the University of Tasmania; and ordained in 1957. He began his career with a curacy in Chigwell. He Rector of Cressy from 1964 to 1966; Director of Promotion for the Diocese of Bathurst from 1966 to 1971; Director of Education for the Diocese of Wellington from 1971 to 1974 and Director of Education for the Diocese of Brisbane from 1975 until his appointment as Dean. He was briefly Principal of St John's College, Morpeth in 1993–94.

Religious titles
Preceded by Jeffrey Michael Langdon Parsons	Dean of Hobart; 1984 – 1992	Succeeded by Stuart Edward Blackler
