= Campaigns & Communications Group =

Campaigns & Communications Group is an Australian company focused on election campaigning and communications advisory founded by Bruce Hawker in 2011. Hawker was formerly chairman and co-founder of the lobbying firm Hawker Britton.

== Political work ==
In the Wran-Unsworth Government, Hawker was a senior advisor to Frank Walker, Attorney-General and Minister for Housing from 1982 to 1988. From 1988 to 1997, Hawker was chief of staff to Bob Carr, while Carr was Opposition Leader from 1988 to 1995 and Premier from 1995 to 1997. While Labor was in Opposition in New South Wales under Carr, Hawker is credited with uncovering many scandals of the Greiner-Fahey period including the Community Polling affair, a covert Liberal fundraising operation which funded phoney independent candidates in the 1988 state election. Hawker is also credited with uncovering scandals and controversies involving former Coalition MPs including Wal Murray, Matt Singleton, Phillip Smiles, Tony Packard, Neil Pickard and Barry Morris. These and other controversies became part of Labor's campaign against the NSW Coalition Government and contributed significantly to Labor winning office in 1995.

In 1997, Hawker and David Britton resigned from their positions as Chief of Staff and Chief of Communications, respectively, to start the government relations and lobbying firm Hawker Britton. When asked to comment about Hawker's resignation, Bob Carr joked, "After all nine years is a long time to spend in a political office." Hawker has had a central role in Labor Party campaigns in all States, the Northern Territory and the Commonwealth, since 1997. Between 1998 and 2007 the Labor Party won every State and Territory election it contested. Hawker was at the center of a decade of success for Labor in State and Territory elections. Between 1998 and 2007 Labor won every State and Territory election it contested. Hawker has also provided advice on campaigns in Greece and New Zealand. Columnist Piers Akerman described Hawker's role in this way: "This model, labelled the Hawker Britton approach by some conservatives, was first trialed successfully by the young Bruce Hawker when he was former NSW premier Bob Carr's chief of staff. It has been adopted by Labor in every state and federally since Hawker, and Carr's former senior advisor David Britton, left Carr's office in 1997 to form the eponymous political consultancy". The columnist criticised the approach in these terms: "The Hawker Britton approach is about spin, not substance". Hawker has been referred to as a stalwart of Labor campaigning and described by a former South Australian Premier, Mike Rann, as "the greatest political strategist in Australia." When he was Health Minister, current Federal Opposition Leader Tony Abbott described Hawker and Hawker Britton as "dirty tricks merchants", while former Prime Minister John Howard compared Hawker Britton to Liberal Party strategists Crosby Textor, saying "Hawker Britton would leave them (Crosby Textor) for dead."

== Recent political work ==
The 2010 Australian federal elections resulted in a hung parliament. Hawker led the negotiations on behalf of Prime Minister Julia Gillard and the Labor Party with independent members of parliament Bob Katter, Tony Windsor and Rob Oakeshott. They negotiated the incumbent Labor government a second term in office.

In its assessment of the process which saw Labor returned to power in 2010, The Age newspaper said Hawker was the official point man during Rob Oakeshott's drafting of reforms to parliamentary process. The Age reported that in the negotiations, Hawker was "an effective behind-the-scenes hub" for Labor. The newspaper also reported that Hawker "has made a professional lifetime of being the man in the room – and his long investment in moving, cajoling, strategising and shaking in professional politics and beyond paid dividends for the ALP in a very dark hour." Hawker's involvement was said to cause "disquiet" amongst Liberal ranks with claims that the independent MPs had been "manipulated by the ALP's strategic mastermind". When agreement was finally struck between Labor and the independents, The Daily Telegraph reported that "Hawker is now being hailed within Labor circles as the man who won Labor back the election." In February 2012, Hawker backed former Prime Minister Kevin Rudd in his unsuccessful bid for the Labor leadership.

== See also ==
- Hawker Britton
- Politics of Australia
