= St Thomas' Anglican Church, Port Macquarie =

St Thomas' Anglican Church
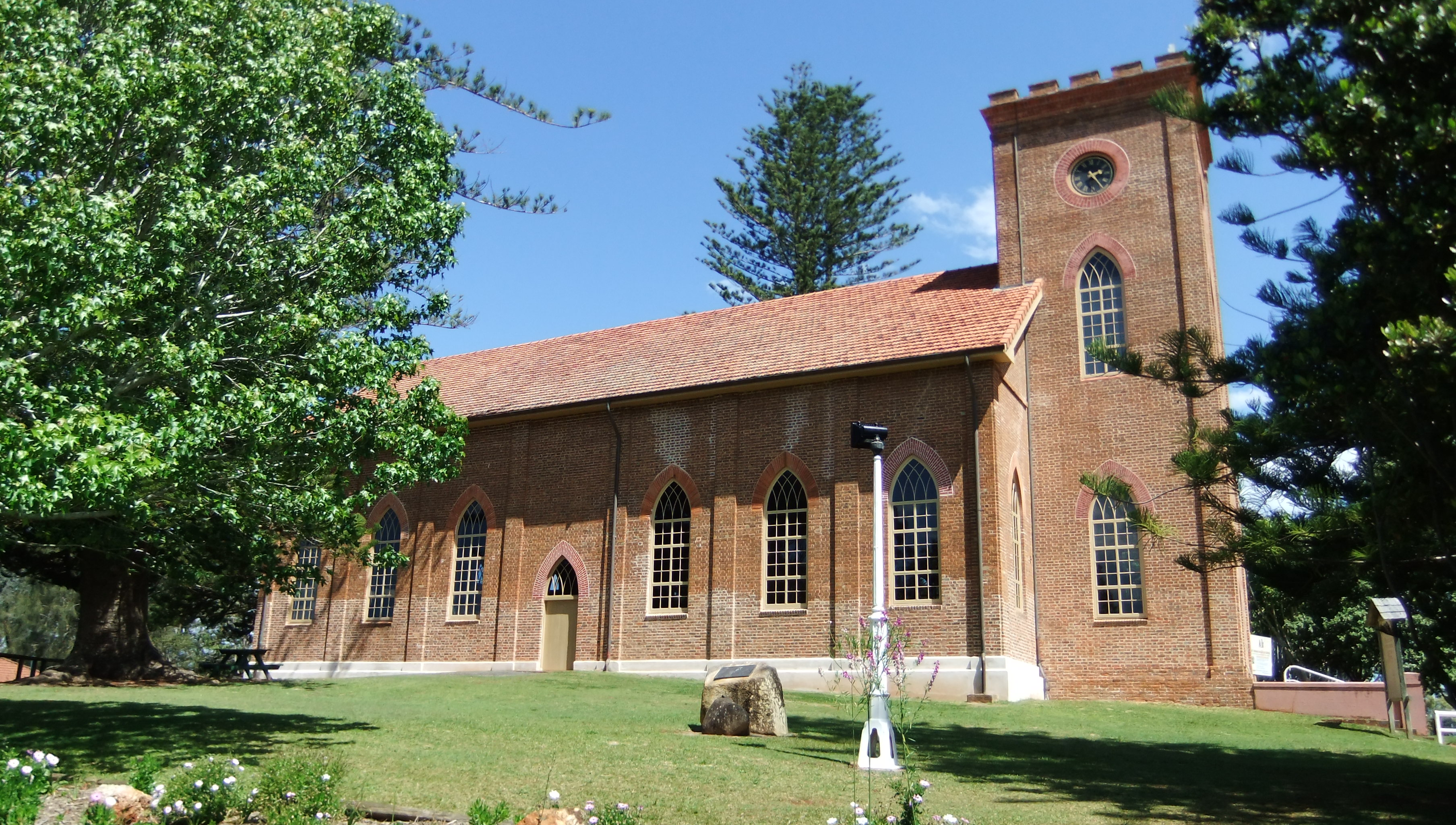
- St Thomas' Anglican Church, pictured in 2010

- Location in New South Wales
- 31°25′56″S 152°54′37″E
- Location: Hay Street, Port Macquarie, Port Macquarie-Hastings Council, New South Wales
- Country: Australia
- Denomination: Anglican
- Website: www.portanglican.com

History
- Status: Church
- Founded: 8 December 1824
- Dedication: Saint Thomas

Architecture
- Functional status: Active
- Architect(s): Lieutenant T. H. Owen, (Engineer and Inspector of Works in Port Macquarie)
- Architectural type: Church
- Style: Old Colonial Gothick Picturesque
- Years built: 1823–1827

Specifications
- Materials: Flemish bond convict-made bricks; Cedar timber windows and doors; Terracotta tiled gable roof

Administration
- Province: New South Wales
- Diocese: Grafton
- Parish: Port Macquarie

Clergy
- Rector: Rev. Daniel Berris

New South Wales Heritage Register
- Official name: St. Thomas' Anglican Church
- Type: State heritage (built)
- Designated: 18 October 2002
- Reference no.: 1653
- Type: Church
- Category: Religion
- Builders: Convict labour under military supervision

St Thomas' Anglican Church is a heritage-listed Anglican church at Hay Street, Port Macquarie, Port Macquarie-Hastings Council, New South Wales, Australia. It was built from 1824 to 1828 by convict labour under military supervision. The property is owned by the Anglican Diocese of Grafton. It was added to the New South Wales State Heritage Register on 18 October 2002.

== History ==
The location of what is now Port Macquarie was first discovered by Europeans when it was found by the Surveyor General of New South Wales, John Oxley in 1818. Lachlan Macquarie, then Governor of New South Wales, was impressed by reports of the area noting its valuable timber reserves, its suitable farm lands, and its seaboard location for ready passage by ship to and from Sydney, and thus established Port Macquarie as a penal settlement in 1821. It was one of only two places for secondary punishment of convicts in New South Wales outside Sydney.

The site for Anglican worship in the newly established penal settlement was reputedly chosen by Governor Lachlan Macquarie, although it seems that Governor Brisbane believed that this would not be a permanent arrangement when he wrote that 'the Church was to be so constructed that it could be used for other purposes when no longer required as a place of worship.'

A simple ground plan and elevation of St Thomas' exist and are believed to be "progress drawing" of the Church. The drawings are signed by the Lieutenant T. H. Owen, Engineer and Inspector of Works in Port Macquarie from January 1825 to September 1827. Little is known about T. H. Owen or if he actually designed the building.

The Church foundation stone was laid by Lieutenant G. R. Carmac, Acting Commandant, also Engineer and Inspector of Public Works, on the 8 December 1824, at a service conducted by the Reverend Thomas Hassall who had been appointed as Chaplain to the settlement in August of the same year.

The building was constructed by convict labour under military supervision and although was completed in February 1827, the first public service of worship was not held in the building until February 1828 upon the arrival from Windsor of the Reverend John Cross. At the time the population stood at 820 souls of which only 153 were free. This began the long and faithful ministry of "Parson Cross" as he was familiarly known, not only to the people of Port Macquarie but to all who resided on the Hastings, Wilson, Macleay and Manning Rivers for such was the extent of the parish until new ecclesiastical districts were established in 1858 and 1860 respectively.

Just prior to the laying of the foundation stone, the Commandant Captain John Rolland died of sunstroke on 16 November 1824. It has been reported in several old publications "that if his body was buried in the local cemetery, they (the convicts) would tear it up, as he was so much detested." Although other reports suggest Captain Rolland was one of the wisest, most competent, kind and enlightened administrator to serve the Colony. The true story appears to be that, as there was no dedicated burial ground in existence at that time (the first burial ground at Allman Hill overlooking the mouth of the Hastings River having been closed prior to Captain Rolland's death and the "Historic" Cemetery in Gordon Street not opened) the only hallowed ground in the settlement, namely the Church, was considered to be the rightful place in which to lay him to rest. The Commandant was subsequently buried in the precincts of the Church to be, and his grave stone is to be found in the nave under the southeast box pew.

Two other buildings stand within the grounds of St Thomas', namely the Military Surgeon's Residence and the Hospital Dispensary which were also erected by convict labour under military supervision between the years 1821 and 1823. By 1847, both buildings were transferred form the Crown to the Church.

Under the supervision of the Reverend Thomas Hassall, a Church School was established and by May 1825 it was reported to the Archdeacon of the Colony, Thomas Hobbs Scott, that Gamaliel Farrell was schoolmaster with 56 pupils. When St Thomas' was opened in 1828, the school moved into the nave of the Church and later into the surgeon's dispensary when it ceased to be used by the government medical officer.

A storm in 1839 resulted in the partial destruction of the Church. As the Government of New South Wales would not provide funds, reconstruction of the Church was carried out by local labour with gifts from the community.

In 1840 a seraphine was purchased and no doubt was used in the conjunction with the orchestral instruments. This organ was moved from the north-east corner of the nave into the Organ Gallery which was constructed at the western end in 1844.

In 1854 the shingle roof was destroyed and was reshingled in 1855. In 1856 the existing pipe organ was purchased in London from Walker Brothers in December 1856 and arrived at St Thomas' on 11 June 1857 and placed in the organ gallery. The shingles were replaced with galvanised iron in 1883 which was replaced in 1923 by terra cotta tiles after the roof was re-pitched 1 metre (4 ft) higher.

In 1897 a hurricane severely damaged the eastern wall of the Church and an extensive appeal to raise funds was held.

Daughter churches of St Thomas' were built and opened at Kempsey in 1858, Taree in 1860, Beechwood in 1880, Ennis in 1888, Rollands Plains in 1895, Telegraph Point in 1900, Wauchope in 1900, Rawdon Island in 1906, Ellenborough in 1907 and Pembroke in 1923. Church schools were operated in Port Macquarie from 1824, Taree from 1857, Kempsey from 1858 and Rollands Plains from 1862.

In 1988 the tower clocks were donated and installed and conservation works to the northeast quadrant of box pews completed, with three other quadrants restored in 1999. In 2002-03, a Federal heritage grant of $69,883 was awarded for works to the site.

== Description ==
=== Church ===
St Thomas' Church is situated on what was known as Church Hill, a large block of land overlooking the city centre of Port Macquarie. The Church presents itself as a simple structure in both form and fabric. The building is of classical orthogonal form with symmetrical facades, rectangular tower with battlemented parapet, and pointed arch windows. The construction is of Flemish bond convict-made bricks, timber windows and doors and a tiled gable roof. The overall form is deviated only by the vestry to the south, itself a simple smaller version of the nave - a rectangular brick structure with tiled gable roof. The scale of the Church is grand yet gentle in its surrounds overlooking a spreading landscape. St Thomas' may be described as Old Colonial Gothick Picturesque. Key style indicators at St Thomas; include the symmetrical facade, tower, battlemented parapet, pointed arch motif and timber tracery.

Georgian in style, rectangular in plan with a square tower at the west end. Roof to tower is a flat membrane, with battlemented parapet. Constructed of Flemish bond face brickwork with lancet windows. Gabled roof form is in terracotta tile. Distinctive convict markings (such as frogs, and tally bricks) can be seen in the brickwork adjacent to entry door. Copper gutters and downpipes. Cedar joinery throughout interior.

=== Walker Organ ===
The finger and barrel organ is of one manual, five stops, pedals permanently couples to the manual keys, with mechanical (tracker) action. The organ has a keyboard compass of 54 notes and a pedal board of 20 notes.

=== Landscape ===
The immediate landscape of the Church grounds is dominated by several Norfolk Island pines (Araucaria heterophylla), in various stages of maturity. The site's landmark setting is enhanced by three large Norfolk Island pines planted c. 1860 by the three stepsons of Reverend Kemp, as his memorial. Other trees include several large Norfolk Island hibiscus (Lagunaria patersonae) and many Umbrella trees (Heptapleurum actinophyllum) along western boundary. Several eucalypts and some palms line the boundary to Murray Street and various native shrubs and trees line William Street. Other features include original access paths, convict retaining walls, and rolling lawns.

=== Colonial Chapel of Christ the Healer (former Dispensary/School Hall) ===
A single storied rectangular brick building with hipped metal roof and double hung multipaned windows.

=== The Office (former Surgeon's Residence and Rectory) ===
A single storied brick house with hipped metal roof with a verandah on three sides. It was substantially altered in 1937 and a new masonry verandah wall and portico added while the second storey was demolished.

The physical condition of the church was reported as generally good as at 8 April 2002. Archaeological potential is high.

The Church is significant for its remaining original fabric, such as the brickwork, the timber and joinery work, the floor paving, portions of the box pews and cedar wainscotting, and much of the movable heritage housed within the Church.

=== Modifications and dates ===
- 1818 - Hastings River discovered by Oxley
- 1821 - Port Macquarie established as a peal settlement
- 1821 - Dispensary (now Colonial Chapel) and Surgeon's Residence (now Parish Office) built
- 1824 - Captain Rolland dies and buried in the nave, laying of the foundation stone
- 1827 - Church building completed
- 1828 - Church opened for public worship, nave used as school
- 1830 - Port Macquarie opened to free settlers
- 1832 - Tower flooded
- 1839 - Church partially destroyed by hurricane
- 1844 - Gallery added
- c. 1844 - Vestry added
- 1846 Original brick floor tiles replaced with paving bricks brought from Woolloomooloo
- 1847 - Surgeon's residence and Dispensary transferred from Crown to Church
- 1854 - Shingle roof destroyed by hurricane and replaced
- 1857 - Lath & plaster ceiling replaced with cedar boarding
- 1857 - Walker organ installed
- 1858 - Gallery extended across western windows
- 1883 - Shingled roof replaced with corrugated iron
- 1897 - Church badly damaged by hurricane
- c. 1900 - Gale unroofed Church
- 1905 - Aisles cemented
- 1906 - Leadlight window depicting St Thomas donated
- 1923 - Roof pitched higher, fitted with terracotta tiles
- 1924 - Chancel floor concreted
- 1962 - Wurlitzer organ gifted to Church by Dr R and Mrs Lane
- 1970 - Gallery rebuilt to its original design and Walker organ relocated to Gallery.
- 1970 - Spiral staircase built in tower. Wurlitzer organ sold
- 1977 - Platform in SW corner of nave built
- 1983 - Illuminated cross installed on tower
- 1984 - Hailstorm destroyed terracotta roof tiles (totally replaced)
- 1987 - Stained glass window of St Thomas damaged by vandals
- 1988 - Tower clocks donated and installed. Conservation works to northeast quadrant of box pews
- 1999 - Remaining three box pews restored.

== Heritage listing ==
St Thomas' Anglican Church, its site and associated buildings is an item of State heritage significance as one of the earliest examples in Australia and has associations with the penal settlement which it served. Built to instructions from Governor Brisbane, the site having been selected by Governor Macquarie and completed during the term of Governor Darling, it is one of the few remaining buildings dating from the convict period - constructed prior to rearrangement of the plan of the township in 1831. It demonstrates the longevity of the Anglican faith in the Port Macquaries area and Hastings Valley region since the area was established as a secondary convict settlement in 1821. The site with the Church, the associated buildings, and the landscape, forms an important focus in the Port Macquarie townscape and is linked with its formation, continued growth and development. The significance of the place is enhanced by its landmark setting, and by its age and the intactness of much of the convict built fabric. The site holds high potential for archaeological research and understanding.

The site's landmark setting is enhanced by three large Norfolk Island pines, (Araucaria heterophylla), planted c. 1860 by the three stepsons of Reverend Kemp, as his memorial.

St Thomas' Anglican Church, Port Macquarie was listed on the New South Wales State Heritage Register on 18 October 2002 having satisfied the following criteria.

The place is important in demonstrating the course, or pattern, of cultural or natural history in New South Wales.

St Thomas' Anglican Church is historically rare at a State level. The site has been in continual occupation and use by the Anglican Church for religious worship and parish administration since chosen by Governor Macquarie in 1821. It is significant in relation to Churches of this age and construction in Colonial New South Wales. The place has played a key role in the establishment of the Anglican Church on the mid-north coast of New South Wales and played a key role in the spirituality of the Hastings region. The Church has been in continual occupation and use by the Anglican Church of NSW for religious worship since the first service, held in 1828. The place houses the oldest extant buildings in Port Macquarie with the former Surgeon's Residence and Dispensary dated 1821. The pipe organ is the only one of its kind in the Southern hemisphere.

The place has a strong or special association with a person, or group of persons, of importance of cultural or natural history of New South Wales's history.

St Thomas' Anglican Church is associated with notable persons responsible for the founding, growth and development of Port Macquarie. The place is associated with the early convict development of Port Macquarie. Built to instructions from Governor Brisbane, the site having been selected by Governor Macquarie and completed during the term of Governor Darling, it is one of the few remaining buildings dating from the convict period - constructed prior to rearrangement of the plan of the township in 1831.

The place is important in demonstrating aesthetic characteristics and/or a high degree of creative or technical achievement in New South Wales.

St Thomas' Anglican Church is aesthetically representative at a State level. The place is significant in its setting within the townscape of Port Macquarie and has attributes of the early Colonial layout of Port Macquarie. The position of the Church is significant in its setting as a landmark building in Port Macquarie. The Norfolk Island pine trees and pedestrian paths from the street boundaries are a significant part of the early landscape of the Church and influence upon the townscape setting of port Macquarie. The Church is notable for its simplicity of design, use of materials and for its condition in relation to its age. The Church has attributes typical of early colonial Church design.

The place has strong or special association with a particular community or cultural group in New South Wales for social, cultural or spiritual reasons.

St Thomas' Anglican Church is socially representative at a regional level. The site with the Church are integral to the identification of the sense of place for the Port Macquarie community and is valued by the Anglican community as a symbol of religious worship and parish administration in the Hastings region. The place represents the first site of official religious ceremonies held in Port Macquarie during the first approximately 15 years of the penal settlement.

The place has potential to yield information that will contribute to an understanding of the cultural or natural history of New South Wales.

St Thomas' Anglican Church has rare research potential at a State level. The convict-made materials and construction methods are representative of the time. The Church is a scarce example of convict building methods and materials and the furniture, photographs, documents and items housed in the Church represent significant movable heritage which has potentially high research significance.

The place possesses uncommon, rare or endangered aspects of the cultural or natural history of New South Wales.

St Thomas' Anglican Church is historically rare at a State level.

The place is important in demonstrating the principal characteristics of a class of cultural or natural places/environments in New South Wales.

The Church is part of a group which collectively illustrates a representative type.

== See also ==
- List of Anglican churches in New South Wales
- Australian non-residential architectural styles
