= Port Macquarie =

- City
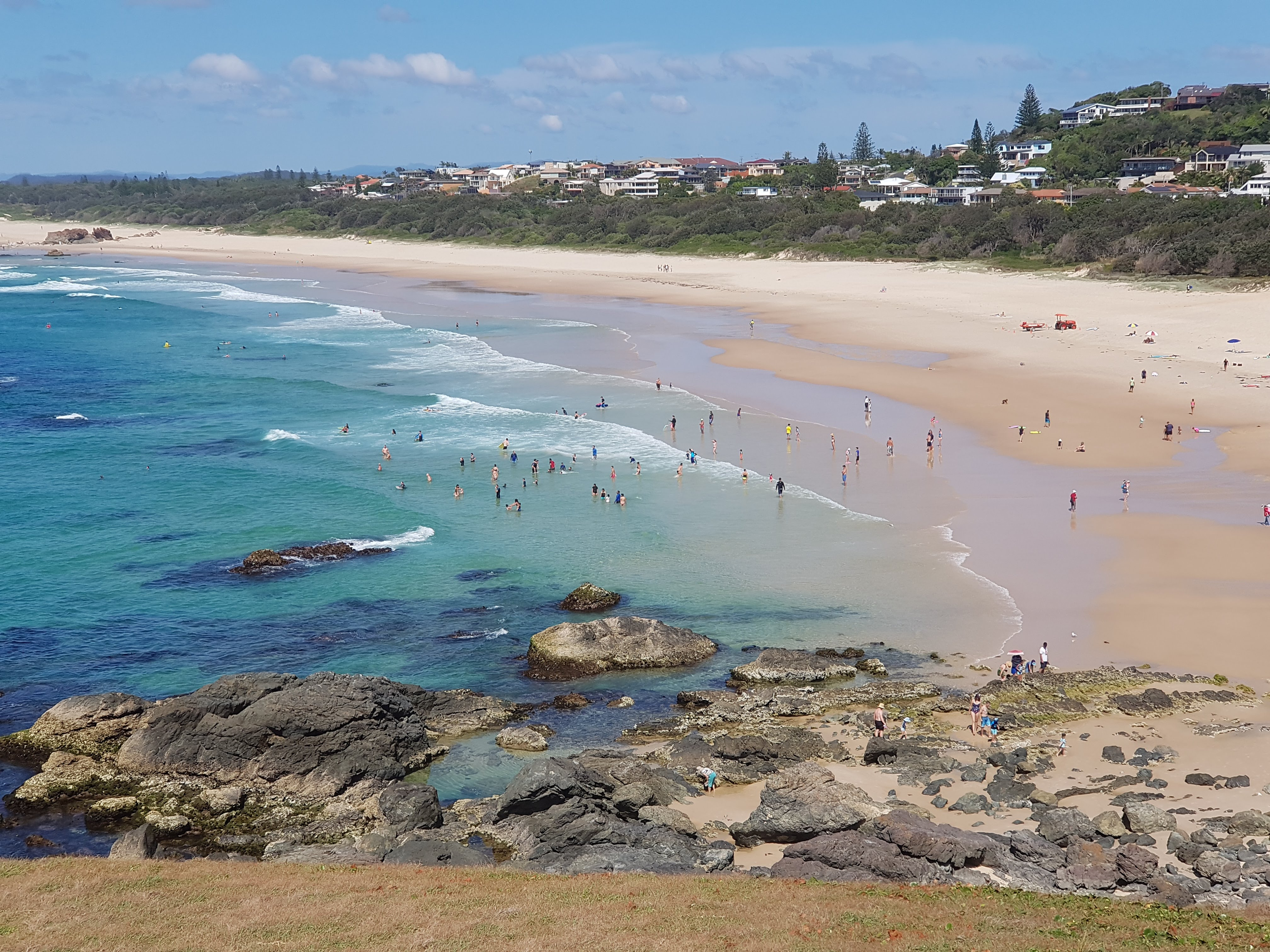
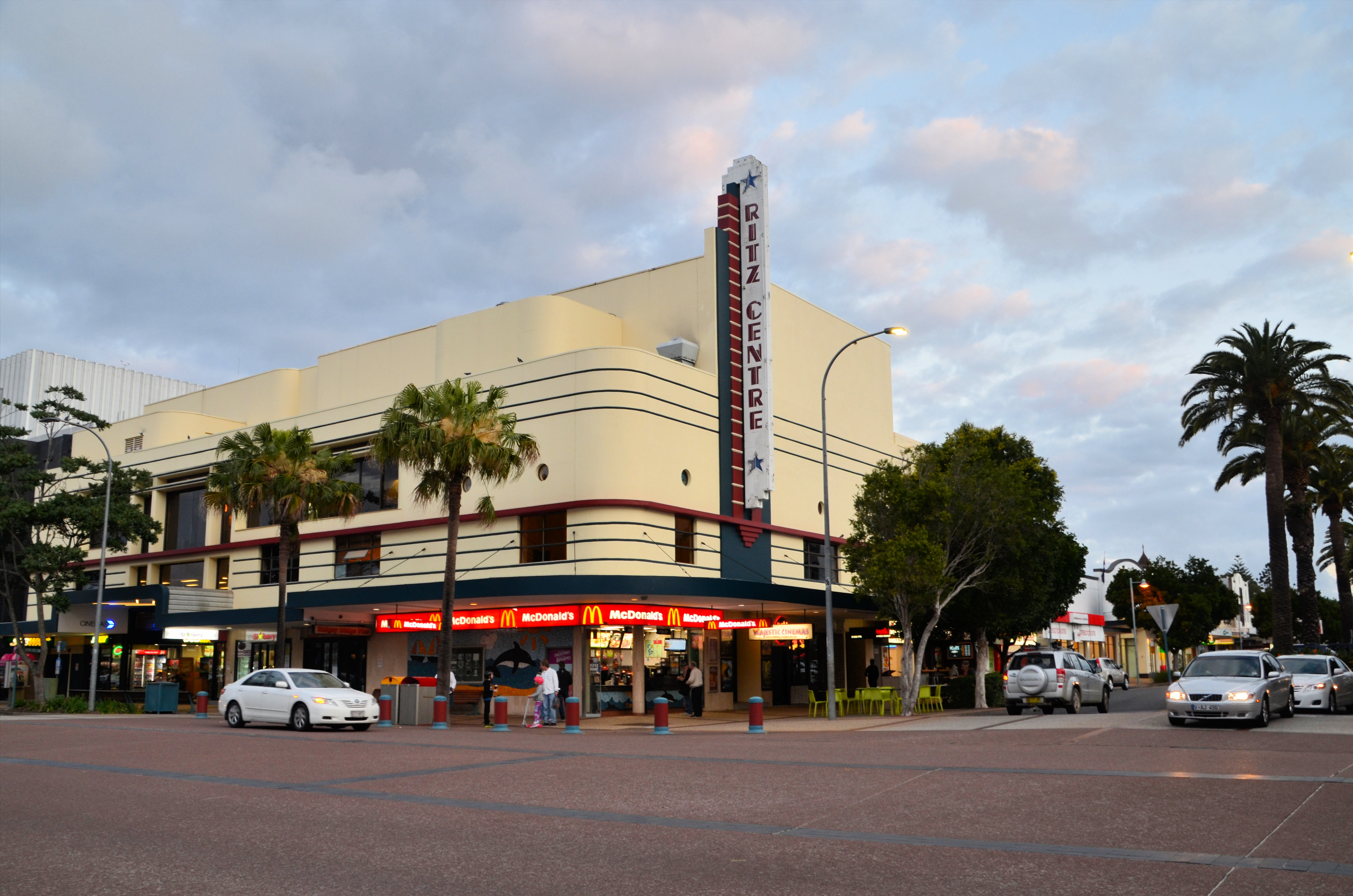
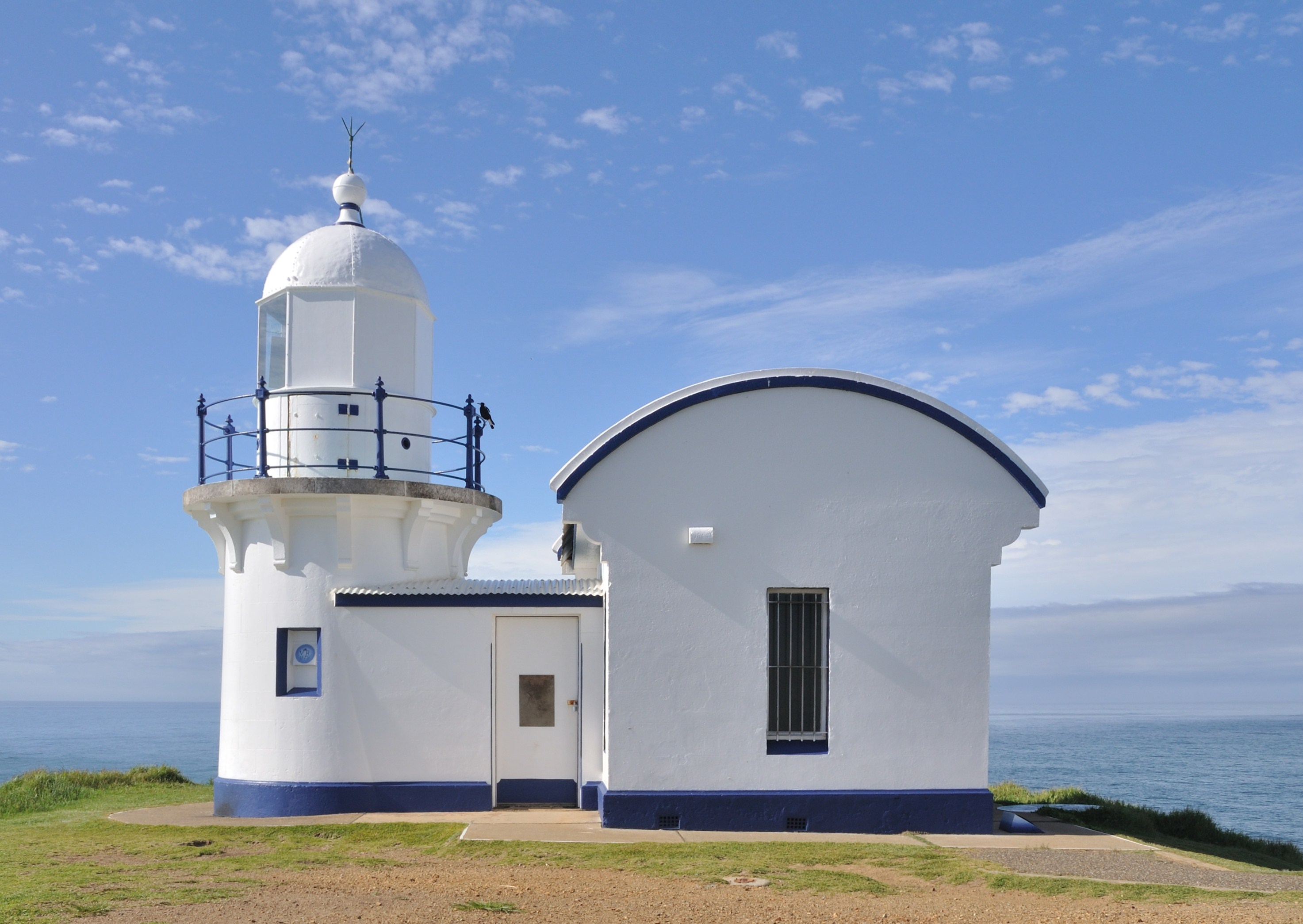
- Clockwise from top: Lighthouse Beach; Tacking Point Lighthouse; intersection of Clarence & Horton Streets, featuring Majestic Cinemas in the Ritz Centre

- Coordinates: 31°26′S 152°54′E
- Country: Australia
- State: New South Wales
- Region: Mid North Coast
- LGA: Port Macquarie-Hastings Council
- Location: 390 km (240 mi) NNE of Sydney; 537 km (334 mi) SSE of Brisbane; 50 km (31 mi) SSE of Kempsey; 81 km (50 mi) NNE of Taree; 19 km (12 mi) E of Wauchope

Government
  - State electorate: Port Macquarie
  - Federal divisions: Cowper; Lyne
- Elevation: 5 m (16 ft)

Population
  - Total: 51,965 (2023)
- Postcode: 2444
- County: Macquarie
- Parish: Macquarie
- Mean max temp: 23.6 °C (74.5 °F)
- Mean min temp: 12.7 °C (54.9 °F)
- Annual rainfall: 1,436.2 mm (56.54 in)

Port Macquarie (locally /məˈkwɒri/ mə-KWO-REE), sometimes shortened to Port Mac and commonly locally nicknamed Port, is a coastal city on the Mid North Coast of New South Wales, Australia, 390 km (242 mi) north of Sydney, and 570 km (354 mi) south of Brisbane, on the Tasman Sea coast at the mouth of the Hastings River, and the eastern end of the Oxley Highway (B56). It had a population of 47,974 in 2018, and an estimated population of 51,965 in 2023.

== History ==
=== Indigenous ===
Port Macquarie sits within Birpai (Biripi, Bripi, Biripai, Birrbay) country, and the Birpai people are recognised as the traditional custodians of the land on which Port Macquarie is located. Port Macquarie was long known to the Birpai people as Guruk. The Birpai Local Aboriginal Land Council provides positive support, information and responsible governance for the Aboriginal community, while also cultivating strong links with the broader community.

Before British colonisation, large clans of Birpai people resided in and around Port Macquarie, particularly at places such as King's Creek, Blackman's Point, Camden Haven and Rolland's Plains. They lived in large domed huts which provided protection against the region's heavy rains and were capable of accommodating up to ten people.

=== British exploration ===
The first documented visit to the site of Port Macquarie by the British was in 1818 when an expedition led by John Oxley reached the Pacific Ocean from the interior, after his journey to explore inland New South Wales. Oxley named the location after the Governor of New South Wales, Lachlan Macquarie.

Oxley noted that "the natives in the vicinity of the port appeared very numerous...were all handsome, well-made men, stout in their persons, and showing evident signs of good living...were evidently acquainted with the use of firearms...their dread of its appearance", and that "the port abounds with fish, the sharks were larger and more numerous than I have ever before observed...the forest hills and rising grounds abounded with large kangaroos and the marshes afford shelter and support to innumerable wildfowl. Independent of the Hastings River, the area is generally well watered, there is a fine spring at the very entrance to the Port."

=== Convict settlement ===
In 1821, Port Macquarie was founded as a penal settlement, replacing Newcastle as the destination for convicts who had committed secondary crimes in New South Wales. Newcastle, which had fulfilled this role for the previous two decades, had lost the features required for a place for dumping irredeemable criminals, that being isolation, which was lost as the Hunter Region was opened up to farmers, and large amounts of hard labor, which had diminished as the cedar in the area ran out and the settlement grew in size.

Port Macquarie, however, with its thick bush, tough terrain, large military presence and Indigenous Australians such as Bob Barrett (also called Monunggal) who were employed as 'bush constables' returning escaped prisoners for tobacco and blankets, provided large amounts of both isolation and hard labour to keep the criminals in control. Under the various commandants, such as Francis Allman who was fond of flogging, the convicts had limited liberties and punishments regularly included whippings of up to 50 lashes at a time and hard labour in double leg irons.

The penal settlement lasted from April 1821 to June 1832. The settlement peaked with 1500 convicts by 1825 but by 1828 this had fallen to 530. The commanders of the settlement were:

- Captain Francis Allman, April 1821 – April 1824
- Captain John Rolland, April 1824 – November 1824
- Lieutenant George Carmac, November 1824 – December 1824
- Captain Henry Gillman, January 1825 – February 1826
- Captain Samuel Wright, February 1826 – November 1826
- Captain Archibald Clunes Innes, November 1826 – April 1827
- Lieutenant Thomas Owen, April 1827 – October 1827
- Captain Francis Crotty, October 1827 – June 1828
- Captain Henry Smyth, November 1828 – June 1832

During the 1820s, merchants such as Simeon Lord and Solomon Wiseman utilised the convict labour to extract large amounts of cedar and rosewood timber upriver from Port Macquarie. Governor Ralph Darling later sent there many 'specials' or literate convicts with a decent education who had voiced negative views about him. As the penal settlement was wound down from the late 1820s, disabled convicts began to make up a significant proportion of the population. One-armed men would be grouped together and required to break stones, men with wooden legs would become delivery men, and the blind would often be given tasks during the night which they performed more skilfully than those with sight.

In November 1821, Port Macquarie became the site of the first sugar cane to be cultivated in Australia. James Williams, an Afro-American convict from Antigua with knowledge of cane-growing, was placed in charge. This colonial government funded plantation worked by convict labourers was later expanded to the nearby Rollands Plains and Ballengarra areas under the management of Thomas A. Scott. Flood, drought and fire caused the plantations to be abandoned by 1831. Scott later lived near Gosford, where the suburb Tascott is named after him.

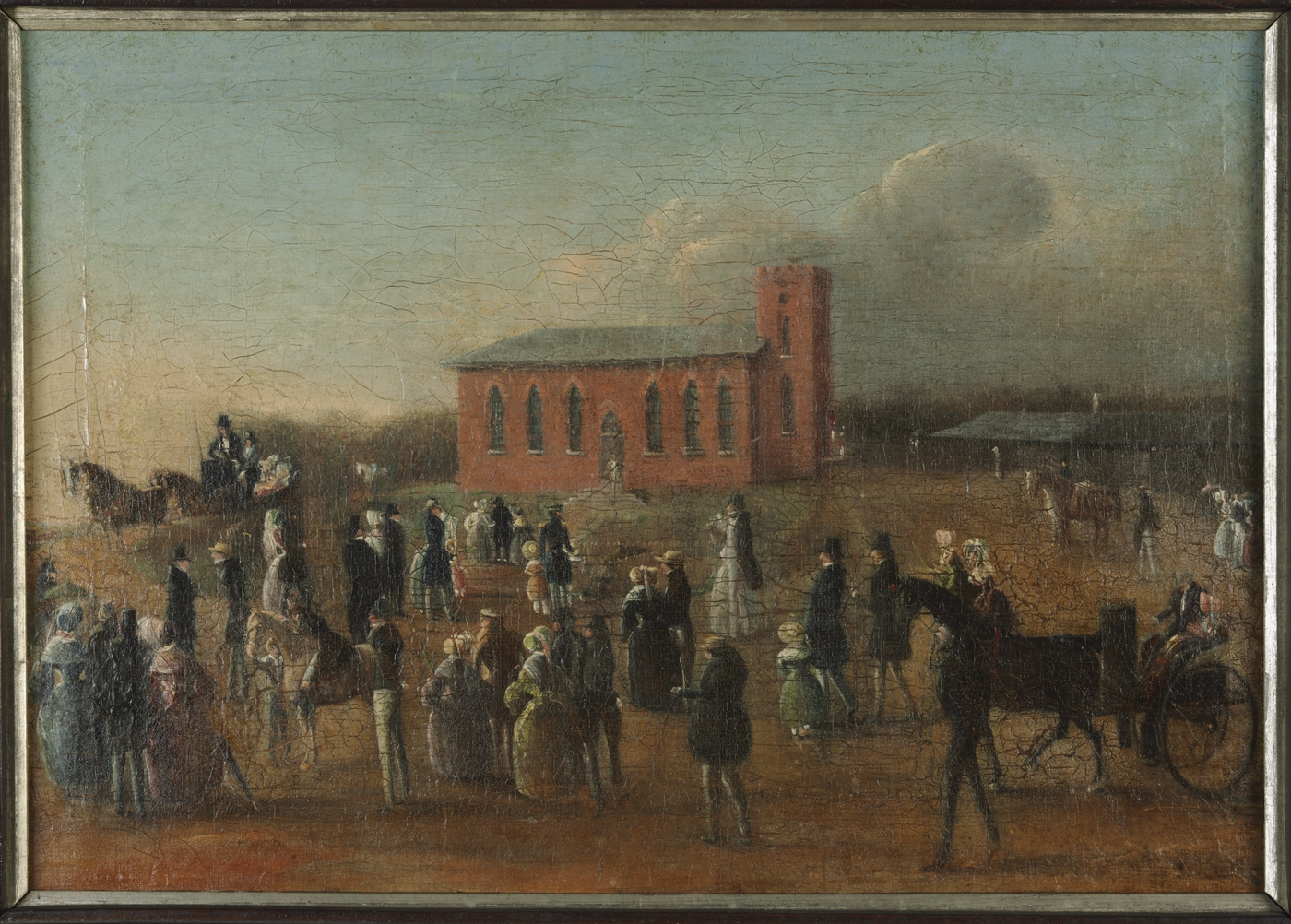
St Thomas' Church, painted by Joseph Backler in the 1830s

St Thomas's Anglican Church is a Georgian building designed by Francis Greenway and built, under the supervision of military engineer Lieutenant T. Owen, by convicts from 1824 to 1828. This church is among the oldest in Australia and one of the few remaining convict-built churches. Inside there are red cedar box pews that were peculiar to that period in church architecture. The Walker pipe organ is the only one of its type in the Southern Hemisphere. The castellated tower permits excellent views of the coastline, town and river. This church is now classified by the National Trust of Australia (NSW) and has been registered on the National Estate heritage list.

In 1830 Major Archibald Clunes Innes built Lake Innes House which grew over the next decade into a luxurious establishment and attracted many notable visitors. It is now a ruin and is managed by the NSW National Parks & Wildlife Service.

=== Frontier conflict ===
As the British encroached into the region from 1821, bloody conflict between the colonisers and the resident Indigenous people occurred. The first recorded incident happened in November 1821 where a convict cedar-getter was killed upriver from Port Macquarie. In 1823, an exploratory party of soldiers shot down two groups of Aboriginal people near Telegraph Point and Ballengarra, causing those who survived to afterwards have great fear of the redcoats.

In 1825, after two convict shingle-splitters were killed at Blackman's Point, a detachment of soldiers from the 3rd Regiment of Foot were sent out on a punitive expedition. They shot dead a great number of Aboriginal people, afterwards raping then killing the captured females. This has become known as the Blackman's Point massacre.

In 1830, a stockman was killed by Aboriginal people at Rollands Plains, leading the commandant at the time, Captain Henry Smyth, to issue an edict prohibiting 'the natives' from carrying anything resembling weapons near the British settlements on pain of death. In 1837, further violence occurred at Kogo where three cedar-getters were killed. Several Aboriginal men, including Wombarty and Terrimitchie were arrested for the crime. Terrimitchie was later found guilty and hanged in Port Macquarie. Frontier conflict in the region appears to have ended by the 1840s.

=== Free settlement ===
The region was first opened to settlers in 1830 and soon after the penal settlement was closed. Settlers quickly took advantage of the area's good pastoral land, timber resources and fisheries.

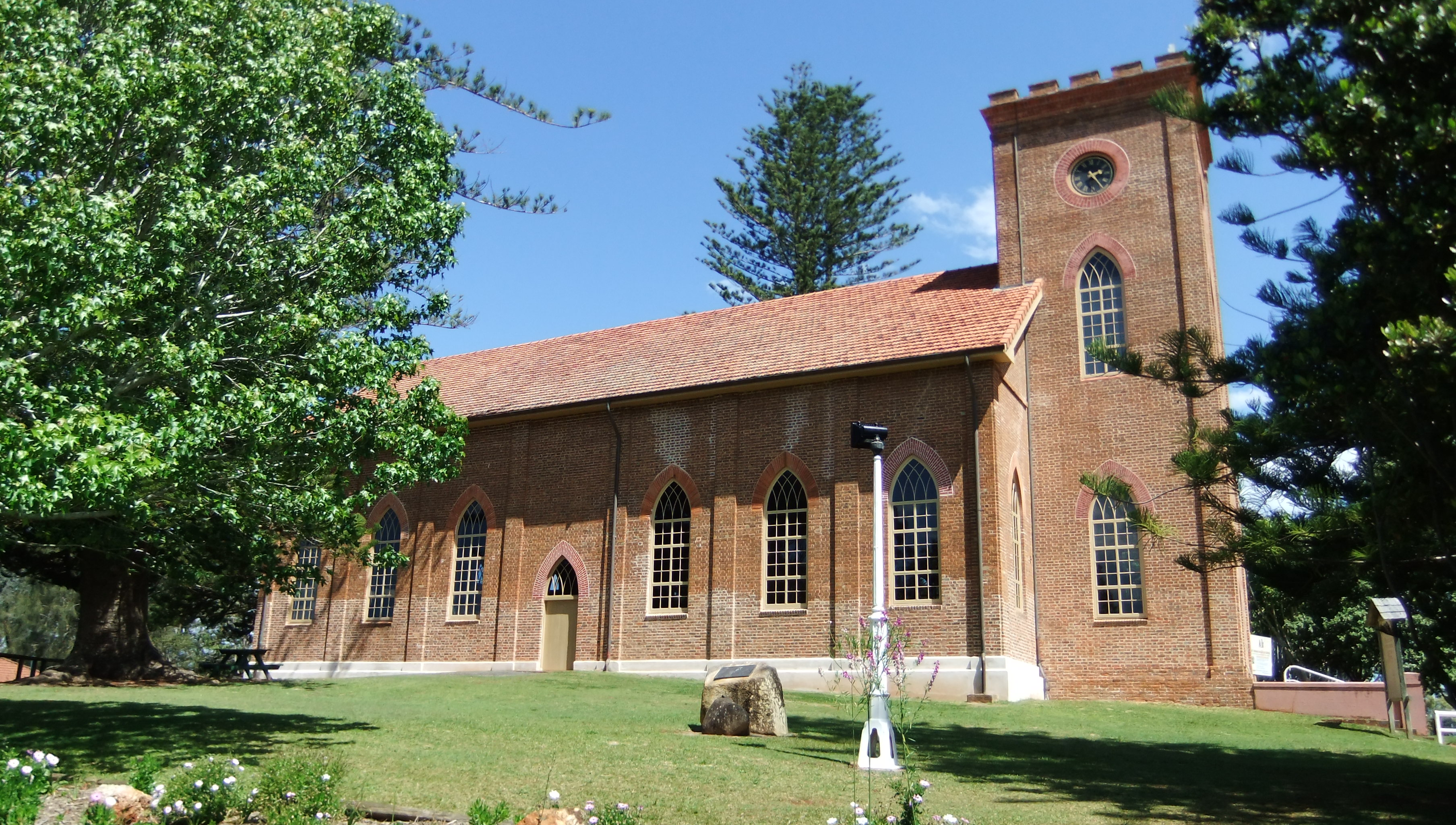
St Thomas' Anglican Church, 2010

The first land grants along the Hastings River were assigned in 1830 to people such as Jeremiah Warlters, William Cross and Matthew Mitchell.

=== Township of Port Macquarie ===
A town plan of Port Macquarie was produced by F. R. D'Arcy in 1831 and most of the first allotments were given out in the same year to military men associated with the penal colony such as Lieutenant Matthew Mitchell and Major A.C. Innes.

In 1840 the Wool Road from the Northern Tablelands was under construction to enable wool and other produce to be shipped from the port. Port Macquarie was declared a municipality in 1887, but the town never progressed as a port owing to a notorious coastal bar across the mouth of the river.

Over 20 shipwrecks occurred in the Tacking Point area before a lighthouse was designed by James Barnet and erected there in 1879 by Shepard and Mortley. Tacking Point Lighthouse is classified by the National Trust of Australia (NSW).

Writer Louis Becke was born and grew up in the town in the 1860s and later recalled those days, saying Port Macquarie was an

old-time town ... a quaint, sleepy little place of six hundred inhabitants, who spend their days in fishing and waiting for better times. There are two or three fairly good hotels, very pretty scenery along the coast and up the river, and a stranger can pass a month without suffering from ennui – that is, of course, if he is fond of fishing and shooting; if he is not, he should avoid going there, for it is the dullest coast town in New South Wales.

=== Modern development and events ===
In the 1970s, Grace Easterbrook, a retired secretary from Scotland, began a campaign against the high-rise developments which were multiplying up the coast. She led a group of citizen activists in lobbying against a large development on Windmill Hill and in other efforts to conserve the coast. In 1974, residents of Port Macquarie requested that the Builders Labourers Federation place a green ban against the construction of high rise buildings on beach head and water front. Easterbrook died in 1984, before the culmination of her conservation efforts, the beautiful coastal walks, were completed.

Severe flooding occurred in March 2021 when the Hastings River flooded during a severe weather event affecting much of New South Wales.

== Heritage listings ==
Port Macquarie has a number of heritage-listed sites, including:

- Port Macquarie First Burying Ground
- Port Macquarie Government House Site
- Hastings Historical Society Museum
- Overseers' Cottages Remains
- Old Port Macquarie Courthouse
- Port Macquarie Second Burying Ground
- St Thomas' Anglican Church
- Lake Innes House Ruins

== Population ==
Historical population
Year	Pop.	±%
1921	1,563	—
1933	1,727	+10.5%
1947	2,905	+68.2%
1954	4,408	+51.7%
1961	5,717	+29.7%
1966	7,072	+23.7%
1971	9,448	+33.6%
1976	13,362	+41.4%
1981	19,581	+46.5%
1986	22,884	+16.9%
1991	26,768	+17.0%
1996	33,709	+25.9%
2001	37,696	+11.8%
2006	39,219	+4.0%
2011	41,491	+5.8%
2016	44,814	+8.0%
2021	47,793	+6.6%
Source: Australian Bureau of Statistics data.

In 1847, the population was 819, of whom 599 were males and 220 were female. The gender disparity was probably due to the penal station there at the time.

According to the 2021 census, there were 50,193 people in Port Macquarie urban area and 86,762 in the local government area.

The estimated urban population of Port Macquarie has grown 1.8% on prior year and from 41,496 over the prior decade. Port Macquarie is expected to be the fastest growing place in New South Wales. The town is expected to grow from an estimated 43,655 people in 2009 to 58,888 in 2027.

- Aboriginal and Torres Strait Islander people made up 5.3% of the population.
- 80.9% of people were born in Australia. The most common countries of birth were England 4.5%, New Zealand 1.6%, Philippines 0.6%, India 0.6% and South Africa 0.5%.
- 90.1% of people only spoke English at home. Other languages spoken at home included Mandarin 0.3%, Nepali 0.3%, German 0.2%, Spanish 0.2%, and Tagalog 0.2%.
- The most common responses for religion were No Religion 37.7%, Catholic 21.7% and Anglican 18.0%.

== General ==
Port Macquarie is a coastal destination, known for its extensive beaches and waterways. The town is also known for its koala population, being the home to the Billabong Zoo (a wildlife park and koala breeding centre) and the Koala Preservation Society's Koala Hospital, caring for koalas injured through bushfire, dog attacks and collisions with vehicles.

In 2016 the war memorial was relocated from Town Green to its original location at the intersection of Clarence and Horton Streets.

The residential suburbs stretch to Lighthouse Beach in the south, Thrumster to the west and to North Shore, on the northern bank of the river. In July 2010, Sovereign Hills began development in the west.

Port Macquarie was found to be the least affordable smaller market in Australia by Demographia's 2013 International Housing Affordability Survey.

== Suburbs and localities ==
=== Central business district ===
Port Macquarie's central business district contains two shopping centres, many specialty stores, a marina, and the starting point for the 9 km coastal walk, a scenic walking trail that travels from Westport Park, through the Port Macquarie CBD to Tacking Point Lighthouse. The Glasshouse, a centrally located arts, conference and entertainment centre, includes a visitor-information facility. Bus services link the town with Laurieton, Wauchope, Kempsey, Lake Cathie and Bonny Hills.

The main shopping centre Port Central, sits next to the Glasshouse, a hub of culture and entertainment, boasting a 594-seat theatre, performance and art studio, gallery, visitor information centre, shop and theatre bar.

One of Australia's largest internet finance comparison websites, Credit Card Compare, now called Finty, was founded in Port Macquarie by Andrew and David Boyd.

Port Macquarie consists of 22 suburbs and localities that form its greater residential and regional footprint. These include Port Macquarie itself as the central hub, along with coastal suburbs such as Flynns Beach, Shelly Beach, Lighthouse Beach, Lake Cathie, Bonny Hills, Dunbogan, and Laurieton. Riverside and rural locations include Settlement Point, Hibbard, Blackmans Point, North Shore, Fernbank Creek, Rawdon Island, and Telegraph Point.

To the west and inland, suburbs like Lake Innes, King Creek, Sancrox, Thrumster, Ascot Park, and Clifton are growing residential and semi-rural communities. Emerald Downs adds a more established suburban character near town.

=== Transit Hill ===
Transit Hill to the south is crowned by telecommunication towers. The district is the site of two arterial roads which provide a direct link between Lighthouse Beach and Port Macquarie CBD. The main intersection of Pacific and Kennedy Drive is situated midway up Transit Hill. It is an area of high-priced real estate owing to ocean and city views. Transit Hill borders Lighthouse Beach, Dahlsford, Shelly Beach and Waniora.

=== Sovereign Hills ===
Sovereign Hills is a newer development in Port Macquarie, between the locality of Thrumster to the east, and the Pacific Highway to the west. Its development is currently managed by the Lewis Land Group. Most recent press releases have suggested that the area will have around 2500 homes when complete.

St Joseph's Regional College moved from its previous location on Warlters Street to Sovereign Hills in 2009. A town centre is planned for opening in 2019, and has been advertised to initially include a supermarket, pharmacy and café. The local organisation Hastings Co-Op has announced that they will operate the supermarket to be built in this new town centre.

As of 2024, Sovereign Place Town Centre (shopping centre) features various outlets, including a grocery store, chemist, fitness centre and multiple restaurants and health and beauty services.

== Beaches and attractions ==
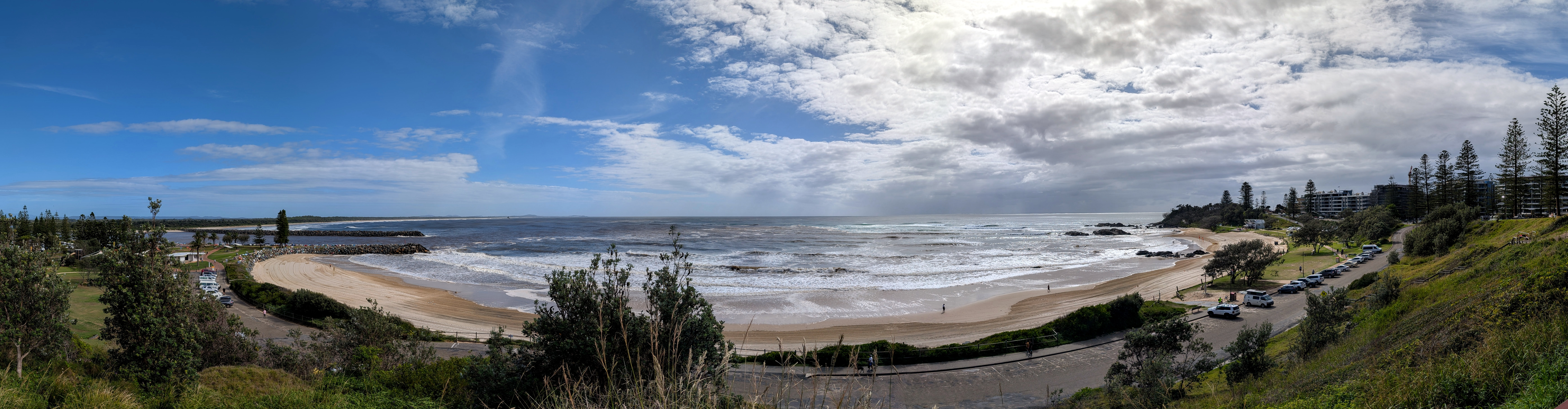
Panoramic view of Town Beach, with the mouth of the Hastings River at left

Beaches (in order from north to south) are: North Shore (a short ferry trip is required to reach North Shore), Town Beach, Oxley Beach, Rocky Beach, Flynns Beach, Nobbys Beach, Shelly Beach, Miners Beach (unofficial clothing-optional) and Lighthouse Beach. Only Town, Flynns and Lighthouse Beaches are staffed by surf life saving clubs. Lighthouse Beach is patrolled at only the northern end. Dogs can be walked off-leash at Nobbys Beach and at Lighthouse Beach, south of Watonga Rocks.

As a tourist destination Port Macquarie contains several major attractions aimed at providing visitors with a range of experiences. These include scenic, historic, educational and recreational themes.

For example, Sea Acres National Park is adjacent to Shelly Beach and contains a Visitor Centre with an access controlled rainforest boardwalk and cafe. The Coastal Walk follows several kilometres of beaches and rugged coastline from the heart of town to Tacking Point Lighthouse.

Billabong Zoo and the Koala Hospital offer educational interactions with wildlife. The Port Macquarie Museum and the Mid North Coast Maritime Museum offer a glimpse into the rich history of Port Macquarie. Douglas Vale Historic Homestead and Winery and Roto House offer an insight into life in a bygone era.

Port Macquarie Astronomical Observatory is a recently rebuilt facility offering space and science related presentations and views of the night sky through its 14" telescope. The Observatory is a non-profit organisation run by volunteers from the Port Macquarie Astronomical Association.

"Sky stories" are regular presentations held Wednesday, Friday and Sunday evenings, they include a presentation followed by telescope viewings (weather permitting). Special events are held at various times of the year highlighting events like solstices and equinoxes and upcoming events with visiting speakers can be found via the website.

== Climate ==
Port Macquarie has a humid subtropical climate (Cfa) with warm, humid summers and short, mild winters, albeit with cool nights. Rainfall is spread throughout the year. In winter and spring, the town can occasionally be affected by foehn winds due to its leeward position of the Great Dividing Range. The town receives 118.9 clear days annually. In addition, it is the northernmost locality on the coast to receive southerly busters, although they are not as intense as those in the southern coast.

According to the CSIRO, Port Macquarie was considered the best climate in Australia due to its mild winters and pleasant summers, and also for its warm water for most of the year that is suited for swimming.

Originally weather recordings were made at a site in Hill St. within the suburban area. These readings began in 1842 and the site closed on 28 October 2003. Some data was still available to 31 July 2010. Recordings began at the Port Macquarie Airport in 1995 providing some overlap of data.

The change has both slightly increased annual mean daily maximum temperature and reduced annual mean daily minimum temperatures by 1.6 and 0.3 degrees respectively. Mean annual rainfall measured at the new site is reduced from 1534mm p.a. over 150 years at Hill St. to 1397mm p.a. over the 26 year period of readings at the Airport. These variations may alter with a longer period of measurement. More information is shown in the following tables.

Climate data for Port Macquarie (Port Macquarie Airport AWS, 1995–2020)
Month	Jan	Feb	Mar	Apr	May	Jun	Jul	Aug	Sep	Oct	Nov	Dec	Year
Record high °C (°F)	41.9 (107.4)	46.6 (115.9)	34.5 (94.1)	33.5 (92.3)	30.1 (86.2)	26.8 (80.2)	27.1 (80.8)	34.6 (94.3)	38.2 (100.8)	39.4 (102.9)	38.6 (101.5)	43.3 (109.9)	46.6 (115.9)
Mean daily maximum °C (°F)	28.0 (82.4)	27.7 (81.9)	26.5 (79.7)	24.4 (75.9)	21.7 (71.1)	19.5 (67.1)	19.0 (66.2)	20.3 (68.5)	22.7 (72.9)	24.1 (75.4)	25.4 (77.7)	26.9 (80.4)	23.8 (74.8)
Daily mean °C (°F)	23.2 (73.8)	23.0 (73.4)	21.8 (71.2)	19.1 (66.4)	16.0 (60.8)	13.9 (57.0)	12.6 (54.7)	13.4 (56.1)	16.0 (60.8)	19.6 (67.3)	20.2 (68.4)	21.9 (71.4)	18.4 (65.1)
Mean daily minimum °C (°F)	18.5 (65.3)	18.4 (65.1)	17.1 (62.8)	13.9 (57.0)	10.3 (50.5)	8.3 (46.9)	6.3 (43.3)	6.6 (43.9)	9.3 (48.7)	12.1 (53.8)	15.1 (59.2)	16.9 (62.4)	12.7 (54.9)
Record low °C (°F)	9.5 (49.1)	10.6 (51.1)	7.9 (46.2)	5.0 (41.0)	−3.5 (25.7)	−2.9 (26.8)	−3.0 (26.6)	−2.4 (27.7)	0.6 (33.1)	2.0 (35.6)	4.2 (39.6)	7.5 (45.5)	−3.5 (25.7)
Average rainfall mm (inches)	155.3 (6.11)	165.5 (6.52)	176.0 (6.93)	139.0 (5.47)	114.4 (4.50)	140.6 (5.54)	64.0 (2.52)	69.2 (2.72)	61.8 (2.43)	73.1 (2.88)	154.8 (6.09)	108.0 (4.25)	1,416.7 (55.78)
Average precipitation days	12.2	13.2	15.2	13.5	13.0	11.8	10.5	8.5	9.3	10.2	13.9	12.5	143.8
Average afternoon relative humidity (%)	65	66	65	64	61	60	55	52	56	59	65	64	61
Average dew point °C (°F)	18.7 (65.7)	18.9 (66.0)	17.6 (63.7)	14.9 (58.8)	11.8 (53.2)	9.7 (49.5)	7.6 (45.7)	7.8 (46.0)	10.8 (51.4)	13.0 (55.4)	15.6 (60.1)	17.2 (63.0)	13.6 (56.5)
Source: Bureau of Meteorology

Previous site, Port Macquarie (Hill Street). This site is now closed and data is now taken from the airport AWS which is located 4.4 km away.

Climate data for Port Macquarie (Hill Street) – 1842–2003
Month	Jan	Feb	Mar	Apr	May	Jun	Jul	Aug	Sep	Oct	Nov	Dec	Year
Record high °C (°F)	41.2 (106.2)	33.5 (92.3)	35.0 (95.0)	33.3 (91.9)	30.1 (86.2)	26.7 (80.1)	28.0 (82.4)	29.4 (84.9)	34.4 (93.9)	38.3 (100.9)	42.3 (108.1)	41.0 (105.8)	42.3 (108.1)
Mean daily maximum °C (°F)	25.7 (78.3)	25.9 (78.6)	25.1 (77.2)	23.2 (73.8)	20.7 (69.3)	18.5 (65.3)	17.9 (64.2)	18.8 (65.8)	20.4 (68.7)	21.8 (71.2)	23.3 (73.9)	24.7 (76.5)	22.2 (72.0)
Mean daily minimum °C (°F)	18.3 (64.9)	18.4 (65.1)	17.1 (62.8)	14.1 (57.4)	10.9 (51.6)	8.5 (47.3)	7.2 (45.0)	7.7 (45.9)	9.9 (49.8)	12.8 (55.0)	15.2 (59.4)	17.1 (62.8)	13.1 (55.6)
Record low °C (°F)	10.0 (50.0)	11.7 (53.1)	8.2 (46.8)	7.2 (45.0)	1.4 (34.5)	0.0 (32.0)	−0.6 (30.9)	0.6 (33.1)	2.2 (36.0)	3.6 (38.5)	5.1 (41.2)	9.8 (49.6)	−0.6 (30.9)
Average rainfall mm (inches)	152.3 (6.00)	178.1 (7.01)	175.2 (6.90)	167.3 (6.59)	144.3 (5.68)	133.2 (5.24)	97.6 (3.84)	81.3 (3.20)	81.4 (3.20)	94.0 (3.70)	104.1 (4.10)	126.5 (4.98)	1,534.6 (60.42)
Average precipitation days	12.4	13.2	14.1	12.6	11.3	10.0	9.1	8.5	8.8	10.5	11.0	11.2	132.7
Average afternoon relative humidity (%)	75	75	74	70	68	66	63	62	66	70	73	75	70
Average dew point °C (°F)	19.4 (66.9)	19.6 (67.3)	18.5 (65.3)	16.0 (60.8)	12.9 (55.2)	10.3 (50.5)	8.7 (47.7)	9.3 (48.7)	11.7 (53.1)	14.3 (57.7)	16.2 (61.2)	18.1 (64.6)	14.6 (58.3)
Source: Bureau of Meteorology

Port Macquarie (Hill Street) Rainfall data 1840–2010
millimetres (inches)
Month	Jan	Feb	Mar	Apr	May	Jun	Jul	Aug	Sep	Oct	Nov	Dec	Annual
Average rainfall	152.3 (6.0)	178.1 (7.0)	175.2 (6.9)	167.3 (6.6)	144.3 (5.7)	133.2 (5.2)	97.6 (3.8)	81.3 (3.2)	81.4 (3.2)	94.0 (3.7)	104.1 (4.1)	126.5 (5.0)	1,515.2 (59.7)
Highest Daily rainfall	274.6 (10.8)	212.2 (8.4)	259.6 (10.2)	298.2 (11.7)	140.7 (5.5)	180.1 (7.1)	140.7 (5.5)	142.2 (5.6)	149.4 (5.9)	150.6 (5.9)	273.3 (10.8)	205.2 (8.1)	298.2 (11.7)
Highest Monthly rainfall	1,387.6 (54.6)	844.5 (33.2)	678.0 (26.7)	619.2 (24.4)	916.4 (36.1)	651.5 (25.6)	774.2 (30.5)	775.5 (30.5)	355.8 (14.0)	419.5 (16.5)	462.0 (18.2)	636.7 (25.1)	3,204.4 (126.2)
Lowest rainfall	5.7 (0.2)	1.8 (0.1)	9.8 (0.4)	7.2 (0.3)	6.9 (0.3)	3.3 (0.1)	0.5 (0.0)	0.0 (0.0)	0.0 (0.0)	9.4 (0.4)	1.6 (0.1)	8.1 (0.3)	734.0 (28.9)
Source: Bureau of Meteorology.

== Media ==
=== Television ===
All major digital-only television channels are available in Port Macquarie. The networks and the channels they broadcast are listed as follows:

- Seven (formerly Prime7 and Prime Television), 7two, 7mate, 7Bravo, 7flix. Seven Network owned and operated station channels.
- Nine (NBN), 9Go!, 9Gem and 9Life. Nine Network affiliated channels – owned by WIN Corporation.
- 10, 10 Drama, 10 Comedy and Nickelodeon. Network 10 owned and operated station channels.
- ABC, ABC Family, ABC Kids, ABC Entertains and ABC News, part of the Australian Broadcasting Corporation.
- SBS, SBS2, SBS World Movies, SBS WorldWatch, SBS Food and NITV, part of the Special Broadcasting Service.

Of the three main commercial networks:

- The Seven Network airs a half-hour local Seven News bulletin for the North Coast at 6 pm each weeknight. It is broadcast from studios in Canberra with reporters based at a local newsroom in the town.
- WIN Television airs NBN News, a regional half-hour long program including opt-outs for the Mid North Coast, every night at 5:30pm. It is broadcast from studios in Newcastle with reporters based at a local newsroom in the town.
- Network 10 airs short local news updates throughout the day, broadcast from its Hobart studios.

=== Radio ===
ABC Mid North Coast has its studio located on Lord Street in the town which broadcasts local news and programming across the Mid North Coast on 95.5 FM and 756 AM.

The ABC also broadcasts Triple J on 96.3 FM, ABC Classic on 98.7FM, and Radio National on 97.1FM.

Other radio stations that broadcast to Port Macquarie are Triple M Mid North Coast on 100.7 FM, hit Mid North Coast on 102.3 FM, Raw FM on 87.6 FM and community based stations: 2MC FM on 106.7 FM and 2WAY FM on 103.9 FM.

=== Newspapers ===
The city is served by these local newspapers:

- The Port Macquarie Express
- Port Macquarie Independent
- Port Macquarie News

== Educational facilities ==
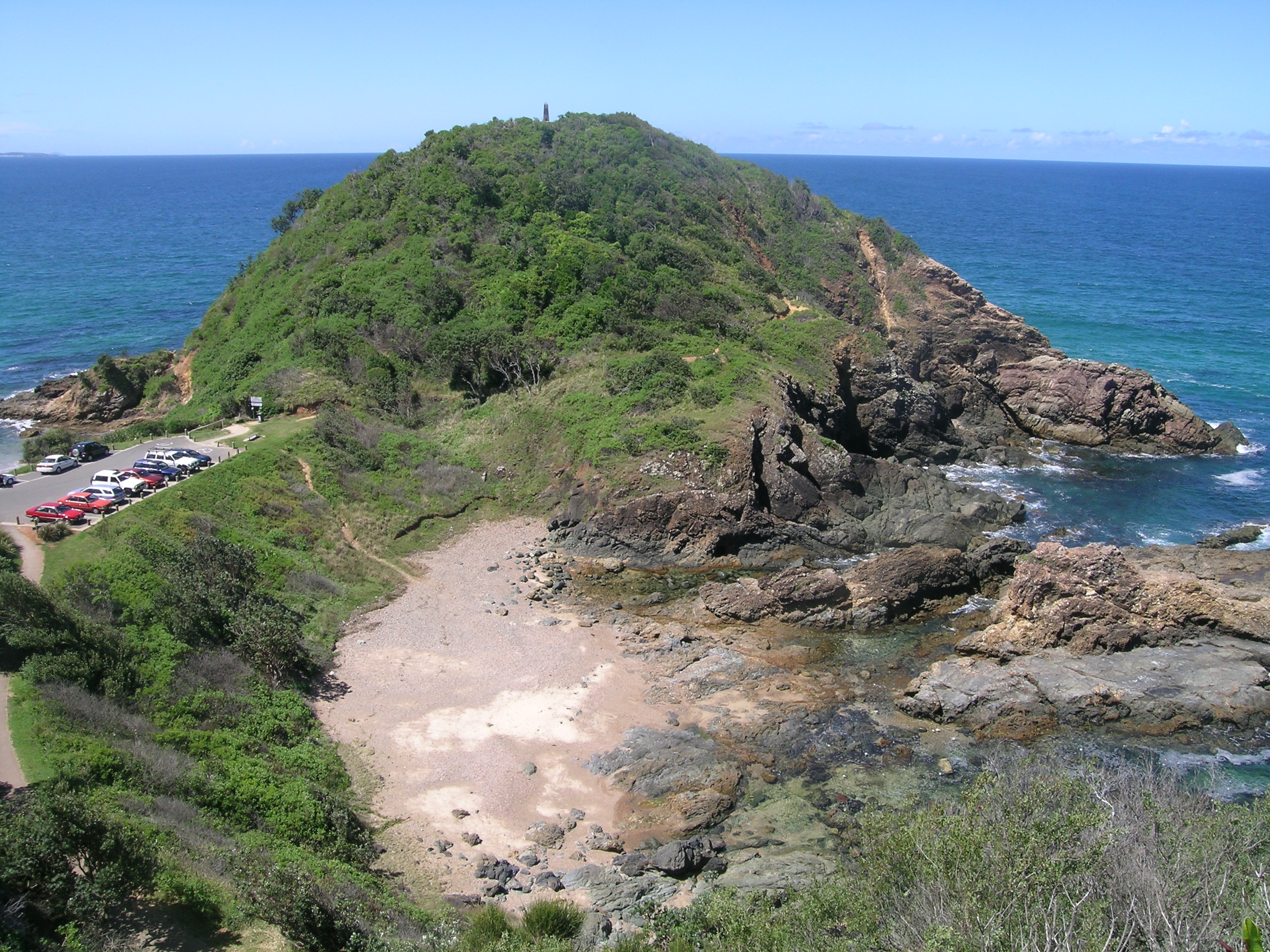
Nobby Head, Port Macquarie

Preschools/child care

- Bangalay Child Care Centre Port Macquarie
- Blooming Kids Early Learning and Long Day Care Centre
- Columba Cottage Early Learning Centre
- Fernhill Road Preschool and Long Day Care Centre
- Goodstart Early Learning Port Macquarie
- Hastings Preschool and Long Day Care Centre
- Joey's House Early Education Centre
- Lighthouse Child Care Centre
- Moruya Drive Child Care Centre
- Port Macquarie Community Preschool
- Port Macquarie Early Learning Centre
- Portside Preschool and Long Day Care Centre
- St Agnes Early Education Centre
- St.Joseph's Family Services
- St.Joseph's Preschool and Long Day Care Centre

=== Primary schools ===
==== Public schools ====
- Port Macquarie Public School
- Hastings Public School
- Tacking Point Public School
- Westport Public School

==== Catholic schools ====
- St Joseph's Primary School
- St Peter's Primary School
- St Agnes' Primary School

==== Other private schools ====
- Port Macquarie Adventist School
- Heritage Christian School (Kindergarten to Year 12)
- St Columba Anglican School (Kindergarten to Year 12)

=== High schools ===
==== Public schools ====
- Hasting Secondary College
  - Port Macquarie Campus (formerly Port Macquarie High School)
  - Westport Campus (formerly Westport High School)

==== Catholic schools ====
- St Joseph's Regional College
- MacKillop College (formerly St. Paul's High School & MacKillop Senior College)
- Newman Senior Technical College (Year 11 and 12)

==== Private schools ====
- Heritage Christian School (Kindergarten to Year 12)
- St Columba Anglican School (Kindergarten to Year 12)

=== Tertiary educational facilities ===
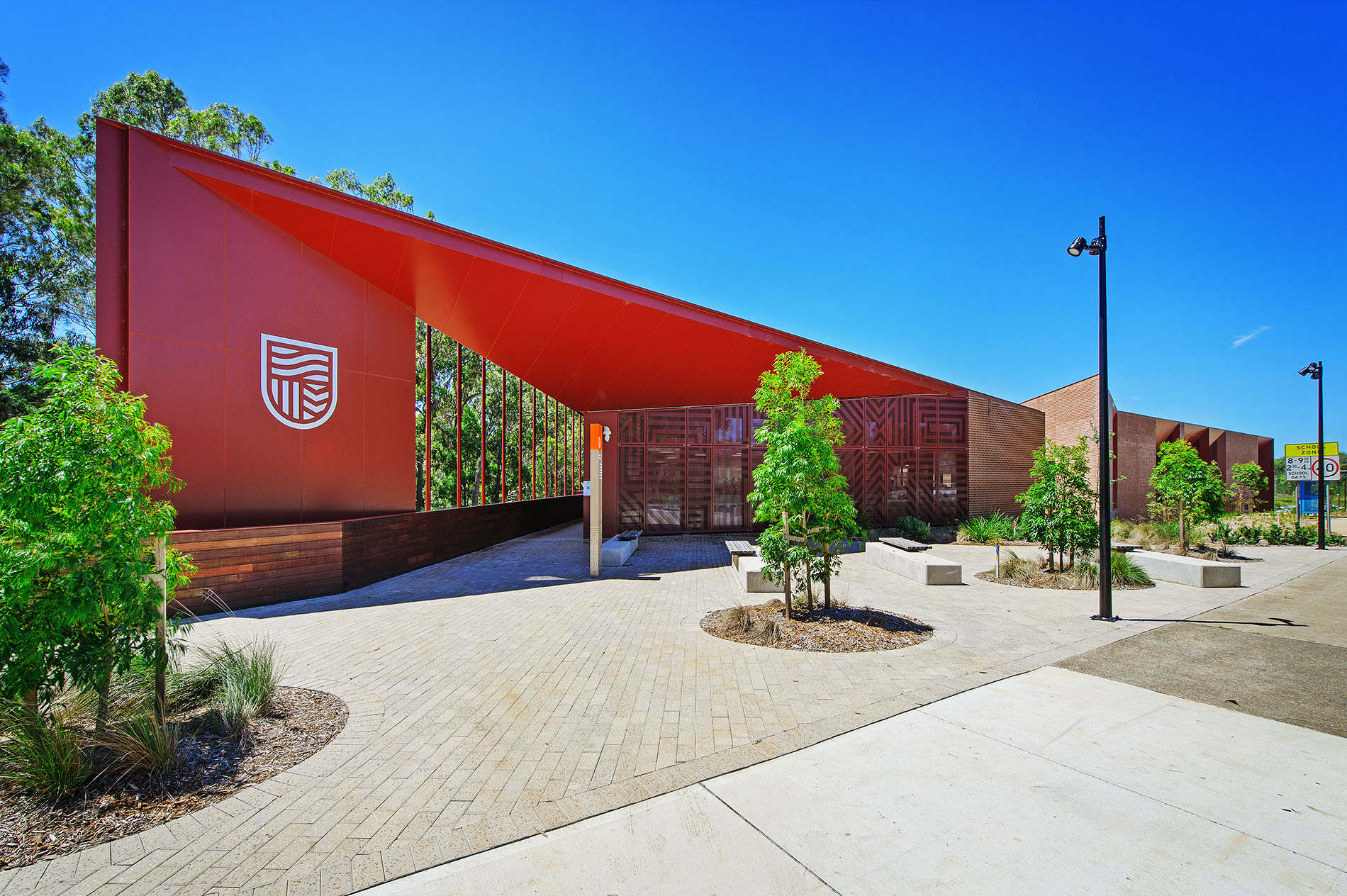
Charles Sturt University, Port Macquarie campus

Three universities and TAFE offer a range of courses in Port Macquarie, as well as other vocational institutions. Charles Sturt University opened a new campus in 2016, and offers courses in Creative Industries, Psychology, Medical Imaging and Medical Radiation Science, Environmental Sciences, Paramedicine, Social Work, Business Studies and Accounting, Criminal Justice Studies, Exercise Sports Science and Physiotherapy, among others. Nursing will be offered from 2020. There is a TAFE campus for further qualifications and pathway options into higher education. Courses are also offered by the University of Newcastle through the TAFE campus. The University of New South Wales has run a clinical school from Port Macquarie since 2007, and now runs the complete six-year medical degree from this Campus. The growth in tertiary educational options in the region has been in response to significant research designed to retain young people in the area and contribute to the growth of the educational standards for the Hastings region.

== Transport links ==
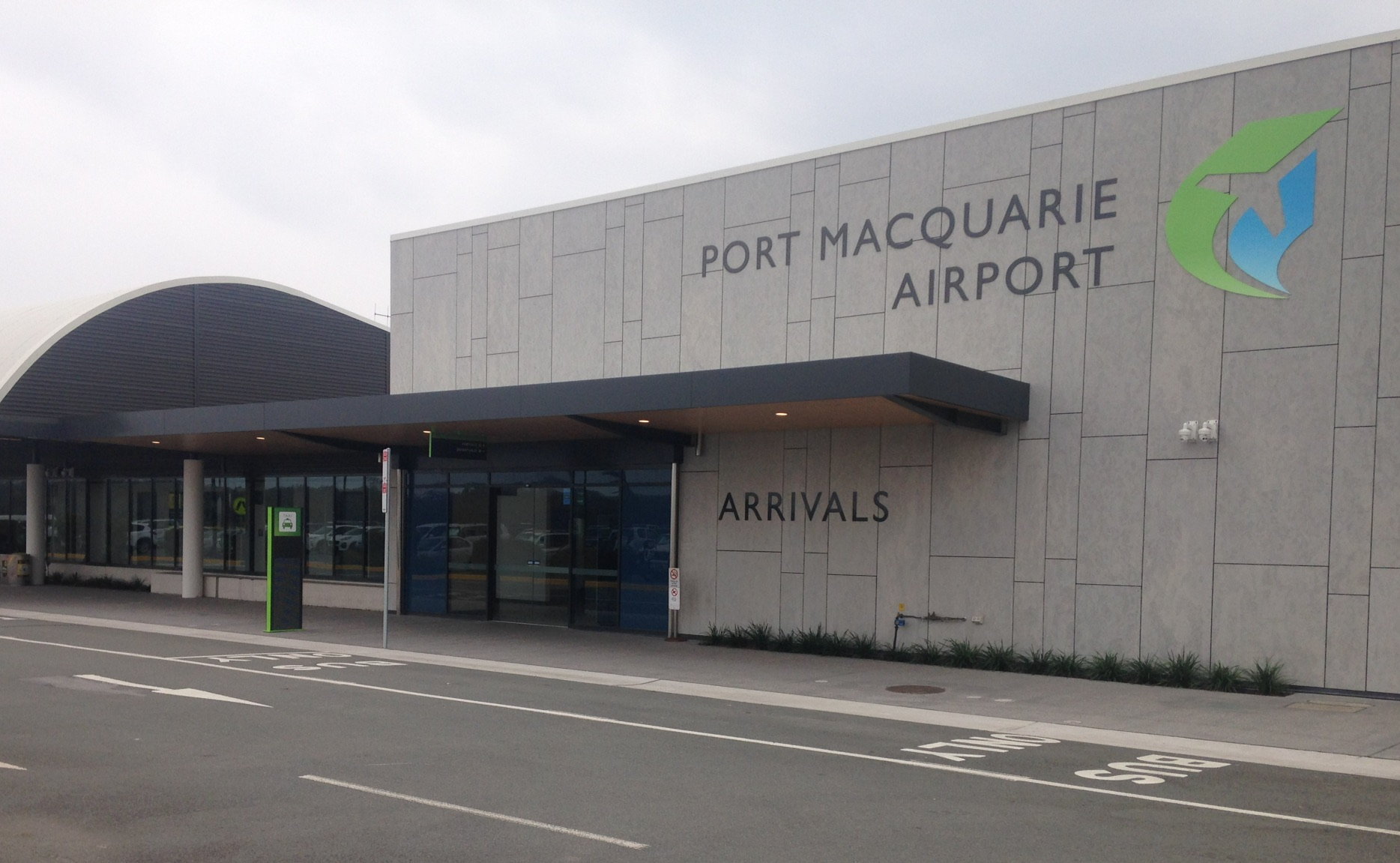
Port Macquarie Airport

Port Macquarie Airport (4 km [2.5 mi] west of town) has regular flights to Sydney with QantasLink (five times daily) and Brisbane with Qantaslink

There is no railway station in Port Macquarie. However, the Port Macquarie CBD and northern suburbs are served by the nearby Wauchope railway station (17 km [11 mi] west of town), and the southern suburbs including satellite towns of Lake Cathie and Laurieton are served by Kendall railway station (30 km [19 mi] southwest). Both stations are on the North Coast Line operated by NSW TrainLink with three services daily in each direction towards either Sydney or northwards to Grafton, Casino and Brisbane. There is a railway-operated connecting bus service available from Wauchope railway station to the Port Macquarie CBD. The largest local bus operator is Busways while long distance services are operated by Greyhound Australia and Premier Motor Service.

Road access is via the Pacific and Oxley Highways. The Pacific Highway lies between Port Macquarie and Wauchope, and is the main road for tourists travelling from coastal areas.

Four significant nearby road projects have been completed in recent years to help with road traffic issues in the area:

- Pacific Highway – Karuah to Bulahdelah section 2 and 3 (Karuah to Bulahdelah section 1 – Completed December 2006).
- Pacific Highway – Bulahdelah Bypass The Bulahdelah bypass/upgrade fills the only missing Pacific Highway link between Hexham and Port Macquarie after the opening of the Karuah to Bulahdelah section(s) 2 and 3 and the Coopernook to Herons Creek upgrade.
- Pacific Highway – Coopernook to Herons Creek.
- The Oxley Highway upgrade, from a 2 lane undivided road to a 4-lane divided carriageway, from Wrights Road to the Pacific Highway.

These four projects are all from the AusLink funding on a joint basis from the Commonwealth and the state of NSW making equal financial contributions.

== Annual events ==
Notable events held in the Port Macquarie area include:

- ArtWalk (variable dates mid year)
- Mountain Bike Festival of Australia – Port Macquarie (first weekend of June)
- Festival of the Sun (December)
- NSW Touch State Cup (first weekend in December)
- NSW Touch Junior State Cup (February)
- Port Macquarie Kart Racing Club's Pacific Coast Titles
- Hello Koalas Festival, established 2017, is the world's first festival celebrating the koala and is held annually in September. Port Macquarie has the largest koala population on the east coast of Australia.
- AFT International Sports Fitness Festival. Highlights include the Move8 VR Walk-a-Hunt which promotes Sports Inclusion, Health Talks & Workshops and a showcase of Youth in Sports.
- IronMan Australia
- Race the Sunset - Runhaven Running Festival

== Notable people ==
- Ryley Batt (born 1989), wheelchair rugby player, four-time Paralympian.
- James Magnussen (born 1991), Olympic swimming medallist
- George Lewis Becke (1855–1913), author
- Phil Carey (born 1960), rugby league player
- Nick Cummins (born 1987), rugby union player
- Nabil Elderkin (born 1982), Attended Port Macquarie High School. Film and music video director and photographer.
- Michael Eppelstun, first Australian to be world bodyboarding champion (1993)
- Damian King, world bodyboarding champion (2003, 2004)
- Isaac Levido (born 1982/1983), political consultant
- Andrew Miedecke, racing driver
- Lachlan Morton (born 1992), road cyclist for EF Education First Pro Cycling
- Aleyce Simmonds (born 1986), country music singer-songwriter
- Dean Thomas (born 1973), motorcycle racer
- Nancy Wake (1912–2011), lived here from c. 1985 until c. 2001
- Garth Walden (born 1981), racing driver
- Brett Firman (born 1982), Rugby League player. Attended Port Macquarie St Josephs College and played for the Australian Schoolboys team in 2000.
- Sam McIntyre (born 1998), Rugby League player. Port Macquarie Sharks junior.
- Jeremy Latimore (born 1986), Rugby League player.
- Scott Dureau (born 1986), Rugby League player. Port Macquarie Sharks junior.
- Thelma Raye (1890–1966), actress, lived here from c. 1950 until her death
