= Reuben Solomon =

British political adviser

Special Advisor
- In office 2022–2022

Personal details
- Born: August 1988 (age 36–37)
- Political party: Conservative Party (UK)

Reuben Solomon is a political adviser based in the United Kingdom. He was a special adviser to the former UK Prime Minister Liz Truss.

== Career ==
Solomon worked for the Conservative Party during the 2019 British General Election. He previously worked closely with Conservative election strategist, Lynton Crosby. Solomon has also served as the head of digital for the British Conservative Party.

In 2019, a series of Facebook advertisements advocating for a No-deal Brexit were created by several supposed grassroots community groups; several of these advertisements were later found to be linked to Solomon. He also worked for the Conservative Party the COVID-19 pandemic and following Russia's invasion of Ukraine.

In January 2022, Solomon was appointed as a Special Adviser to Liz Truss, who was serving as the Foreign Secretary at the time. He went on to become the leader of Truss's digital campaign during the British Conservative Party leadership election in mid-2022.

In May 2023, Solomon launched Ridgeway Strategy, a political consultancy company. In May 2024, Ridgeway announced the opening of its Middle East office in Abu Dhabi.
