= Isaac Levido =

Australian political strategist

Isaac Levido OBE
- Born: August 1983 (age 43); Port Macquarie, New South Wales, Australia
- Occupation: Political consultant

Isaac Levido OBE (born 1983) is an Australian political strategist who was the head of the British Conservative Party's campaigns in the 2019 United Kingdom general election and 2024 United Kingdom general election.

== Early life ==
Levido was raised in Port Macquarie, New South Wales, Australia. The eldest of three boys, his father, Justin, was a local councillor who inculcated in the junior Levido a love for politics at a young age. He studied at the Port Macquarie-based St Agnes' Primary School, St Joseph's Regional and MacKillop College, furthering his education in Canberra and the United States at Georgetown University.

== Career ==
While in the United States, Levido worked on several Republican campaigns for U.S. Senate. He was a protégé of Sir Lynton Crosby, whom he had met while working for the Conservative Party's 2015 general election campaign. Levido was then hired by Crosby's consultancy CTF Partners and was in charge of running its office in Washington, D.C.

Levido was also involved in the party's 2017 general election campaign, as well as Zac Goldsmith's campaign during the 2016 London mayoral election. During the 2019 Australian federal election, he was a deputy of the campaign director for the Liberal Party of Australia, Andrew Hirst. Levido headed the Conservative Party's successful campaign in the 2019 United Kingdom general election.

In March 2020, Levido was tasked by Prime Minister Boris Johnson to improve the government's coronavirus-related messaging; Levido is credited with coining the slogan, "Stay At Home, Protect the NHS, Save Lives". In May 2020, he moved into an office in Downing Street to work on a snappy slogan for the easing of the UK Government's coronavirus restrictions. When Dominic Cummings, the Chief Adviser to Johnson, was infected with coronavirus in March 2020, it had already been decided that Mr Levido would temporarily take his place.

Levido left Downing Street in July 2020 to found Fleetwood Strategy. He was appointed Officer of the Order of the British Empire (OBE) in the 2020 Birthday Honours for political service. The New Statesman named him as the fifteenth most powerful right-wing figure in the UK in 2023. He worked with Rishi Sunak on the Conservative Party's strategy in the 2024 United Kingdom general election.
