= Bruce Hawker =

Australian political strategist (born 1955)

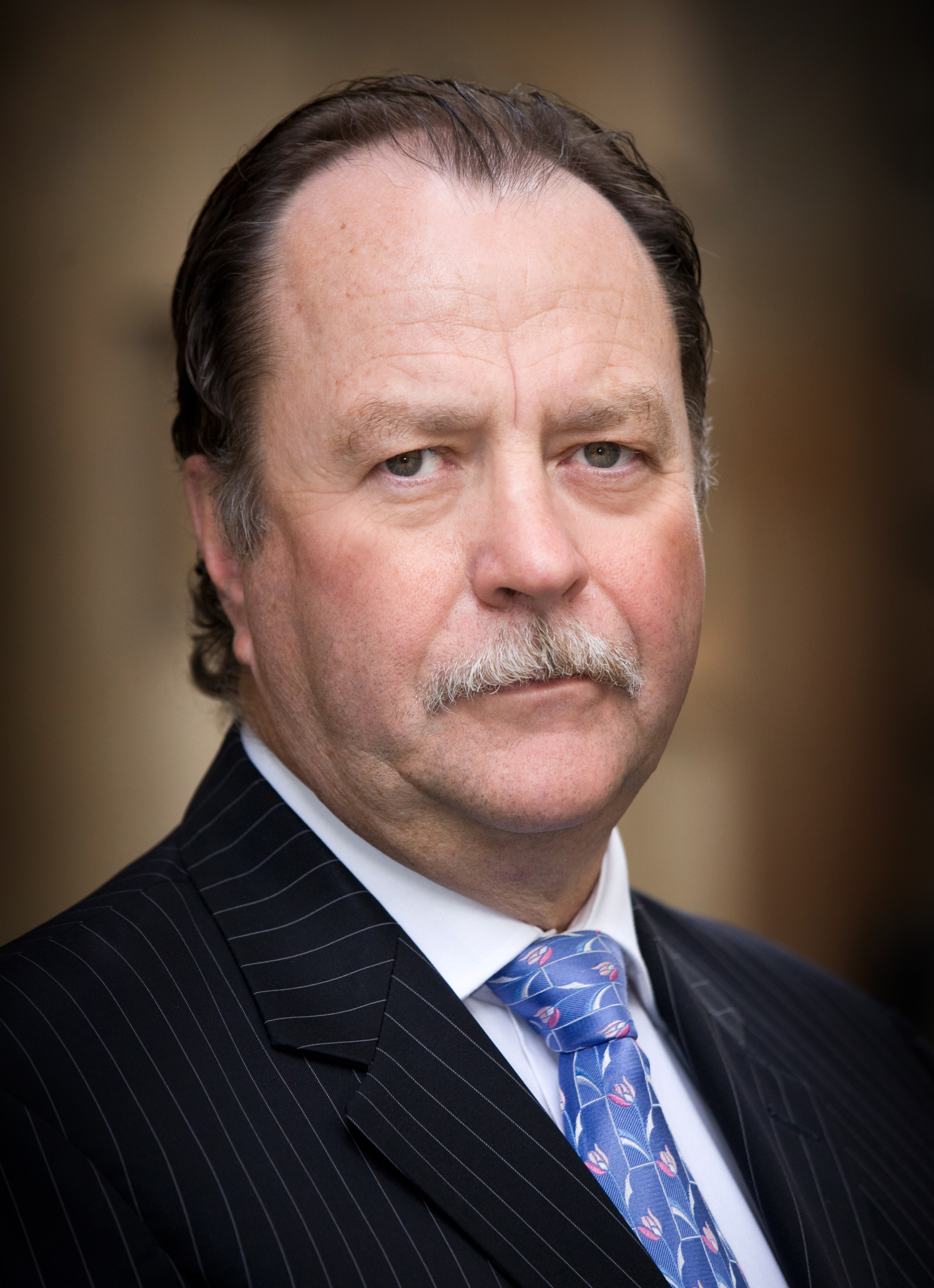
- Hawker in 2010
- Born: Bruce Hawker; 18 August 1955 (age 71); Edinburgh, Scotland, United Kingdom
- Education: University of Queensland; University of New South Wales
- Occupations: Political pundit, political writer, political consultant, political advisor
- Years active: 1982 -
- Political party: Australian Labor Party
- Website: http://www.candcgroup.com.au/

Bruce Hawker (born 18 August 1955) is an Australian political strategist, commentator and chairman of Campaigns & Communications Group, which he founded in January 2011.

Along with David Britton, he was the chairman and founding member of Hawker Britton until his resignation in January 2011. Hawker was the chief of staff to New South Wales premier Bob Carr, a position he held for nine years before resigning to establish Hawker Britton in April 1997. Hawker has played a key role as a strategist on a series of election campaigns for Kevin Rudd; Premier Carr; South Australian Premier Mike Rann and Queensland Premiers Peter Beattie and Anna Bligh. In 2013, he was appointed Prime Minister Rudd's political director. He is the author of The Rudd Rebellion: The Campaign to Save Labor, published in November 2013 by Melbourne University Press.

== Career ==
Hawker has a Bachelor of Arts degree from the University of Queensland and a law degree from the University of New South Wales.

=== Hawker Britton ===
In 1997, Hawker and David Britton resigned from their positions as Chief of Staff and Chief of Communications, respectively, to start Hawker Britton. When asked to comment about Hawker's resignation, Bob Carr joked, "After all, nine years is a long time to spend in a political office." In 1999, Hawker Britton outgrew its office in The Rocks, relocating to a heritage post office building in Millers Point. It now has at least six Australian offices; an office in Wellington; another in New Zealand; and three international offices in Washington, D.C., London and Shanghai.

Following the 2010 federal election, a hung parliament resulted. Hawker led the negotiations with independents Bob Katter, Tony Windsor and Rob Oakeshott which secured the incumbent Labor government led by Julia Gillard a second term.

=== Rudd Government ===
In June 2013, Hawker was appointed Prime Minister Rudd's political adviser, a position he held until the Government's defeat in the 2013 federal election in September 2013. Following the election, Melbourne University Publishing published his campaign diaries, The Rudd Rebellion: The Campaign to Save Labor. News Corp Australia hired political editor Col Allan from New York specifically for election-related coverage. A review of the press coverage commissioned by the Labor Party found that The Daily Telegraph published negative press at double the rate of competitor Fairfax. Against the odds, the Labor campaign directed by Hawker resulted in Labor retention of 55 seats when 30 seats was the predicted outcome. The campaign ensured that Labor avoided political annihilation and saw every cabinet minister returned to parliament.

=== Campaigns & Communications Group ===
Hawker is a regular contributor to the media, writing opinion pieces and editorials for The Sydney Morning Herald and frequently appearing in interviews on Sky News and the Australian Broadcasting Corporation. When it was suggested that he was resigning from Hawker Britton due to the thinning out of state Labor governments, Hawker dismissed these suggestions saying, "We've always worked on the basis that Labor governments will come and Labor governments will go, we've always tried to assist in the election of Labor governments, but we are realistic and pragmatic enough to understand no government lasts forever."

== See also ==
- Hawker Britton
