= Justin Di Lollo =

- Education: University of Western Australia; Australian Graduate School of Management
- Occupations: Lobbyist; political writer; political consultant
- Years active: 1988–present
- Website: www.hawkerbritton.com

Justin Di Lollo is an Australian lobbyist. He established a Sydney office of the firm Hakluyt and Company.

== Early career ==
Prior to lobbying, Di Lollo was a political staffer. He advised multiple MPs within the ALP caucus between 1988 and 1999. He was a staffer to Kim Beazley between 1994 and 1999, while the MP was Minister for Finance, Deputy Prime Minister, and Leader of the Opposition.

== Lobbying career ==
After finishing work as a political staffer, Di Lollo worked as a lobbyist for Hawker Britton and eventually become a managing director in 2010. His lobbying role included advocacy on behalf of banking and coal seam gas interests.

=== STW Group/WPP AUNZ ===
Di Lollo was the practice director of government-relations firms for the STW Group (ASX:SGN), which was a part-owner of multiple government-relations and public affairs firms in Australia, New Zealand and southeast Asia.

In 2016, STW Group merged with the Australian and New Zealand businesses of WPP plc following shareholder approval. Di Lollo was executive director of WPP AUNZ Government Relations with management over Hawker Britton and Barton Deakin.

=== Other activities ===
Di Lollo is a Member of the Council of Governors of the American Chamber of Commerce in Australia.
