= Port Macquarie First Burying Ground =

Public park in Port Macquarie, NSW, Australia

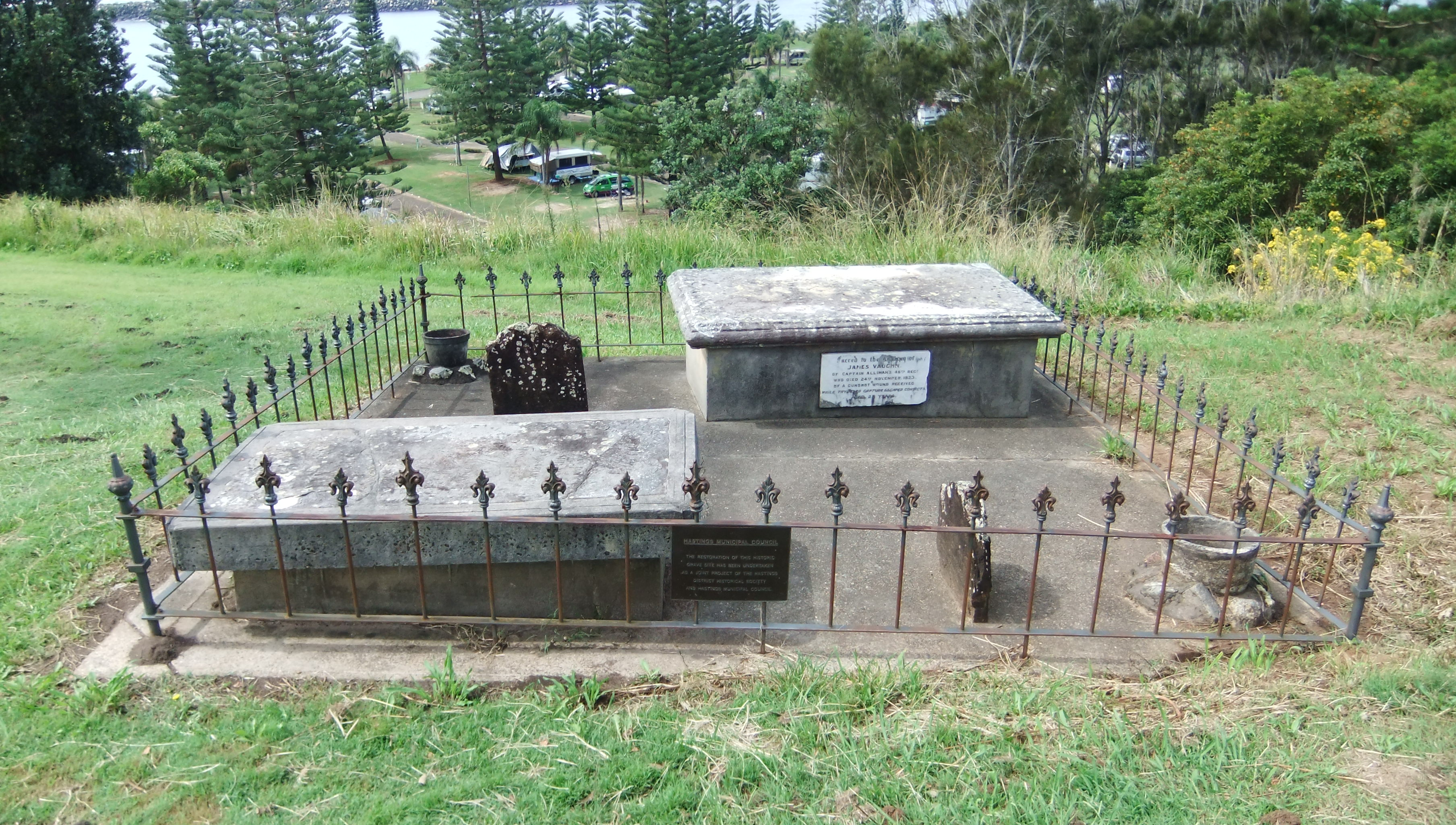
- Surviving gravestones in 2011

- Location within New South Wales Location within Australia
- 31.4282°S 152.9138°E
- Location: Clarence Street, Port Macquarie, Port Macquarie-Hastings Council, New South Wales, Australia

History
- Built: 1822–1824

Site notes
- Owner: Port Macquarie-Hastings Council

New South Wales Heritage Register
- Official name: Port Macquarie First (Allman Hill) Burying Ground 1822–1824; Allman Hill Burying Ground; Port Macquarie Burying Ground; Old Port Macquarie Cemetery
- Type: state heritage (landscape)
- Designated: 1 July 2005
- Reference no.: 1730
- Type: Cemetery/Graveyard/Burial Ground
- Category: Cemeteries and Burial Sites

Port Macquarie First Burying Ground is a heritage-listed former cemetery and now public park at Clarence Street, Port Macquarie, Port Macquarie-Hastings Council, New South Wales, Australia. The site was chosen by Captain Allman, and it was in use from 1822 to 1824. It is also known as Allman Hill Burying Ground, Port Macquarie Burying Ground and Old Port Macquarie Cemetery. The property is owned by Port Macquarie-Hastings Council. It was added to the New South Wales State Heritage Register on 1 July 2005.

== History ==
In the early days of the Penal Settlement at Port Macquarie it was appreciated that there would be a need for a burial ground. The absence of wheeled vehicles and the wooded nature of the surrounding countryside probably dictated the chosen site, on a convenient hillside, with good drainage, easy tilling and relative remoteness from the centre of the then settlement. The first burial of convict James McMahon took place on 22 July 1822, and the last of a total of 28 interments was that of convict John Abrahams, on 14 November 1824. By this time there was a need for a new burial ground, further from the settled area, and the Second Burying Ground was established, on a peninsula to the south of the Settlement.

== Description ==
Allman Hill Burying Ground is located on an exposed grassy site with a northerly aspect at the top of a slope overlooking the breakwater at the mouth of the Hastings River. The site drops away sharply to the north to the foreshore parkland and a caravan park. It is bounded on the west by multi-storey residential development, on the south by Clarence Street and on the east by public parklands, with tourist parking and picnic facilities.

The majority of the 28 burial sites are unmarked. The four remaining monuments on Allman Hill are within a four-metre square fenced enclosure, two stelae having been relocated from their original positions nearby. There are no ornamental plantings at the Allman Hill Burying Ground although cement urns at two corners of the concrete slabs were apparently once planted with pelargoniums.

The landscape was modified on several occasions in conversion to public parkland.

The First Burying Ground is generally in good condition. It is managed as an historic site and public parkland, with four surviving monuments set in a concrete slab within an iron palisade fence. The burial area is likely to have extended a considerable distance beyond the present area occupied by monuments i.e., on the slopes of the hill. The original cemetery area was reduced when Clarence Street extended, thereby separating the extant cemetery site from the land now occupied by Port Macquarie Public School. The site has considerable archaeological potential.

The cemetery has lost much of its original fabric, however, it retains four very early monuments, from the convict era at Port Macquarie.

== Heritage listing ==
The cultural landscape of the Allman Hill Burying Ground at Port Macquarie is of State Heritage Significance as a place of historical, social, architectural, cultural, archaeological and aesthetic significance for the Hastings region and the State of New South Wales.

The Allman Hill Burying Ground is important in the course and pattern of the cultural history of New South Wales because of its historical associations and significant documentary and physical evidence of the evolution of the place, being the burial place for at least 28 persons, whose lives contributed to and enriched the history and development of a significant settlement in New South Wales.

The Allman Hill Burying Ground is historically significant at a State level for its strong associations with a number of individuals and families important in the development of Port Macquarie and New South Wales.

The Allman Hill Burying Ground is important in demonstrating aesthetic characteristics in New South Wales. The cemetery exhibits two monumental styles reflecting contemporary approaches to the commemoration of the dead. The setting for the burying ground, on a hillside overlooking the mouth of the Hastings River produces a dramatic cultural landscape with high visual appeal.

The Allman Hill Burying Ground has strong associations for social and cultural reasons with the past and contemporary community of Port Macquarie, an area settled early in the development of the colony of New South Wales.

The high esteem in which the place is held by a significant group within the community is reflected in the fact that its conservation is widely supported by the local community of Port Macquarie, the site is visited by many tourists to the area and the place is listed on several registers of heritage items.

The Allman Hill Burying Ground has potential to yield information that will contribute to an understanding of NSW's cultural history. The cemetery has considerable educational and interpretative potential as a resource for the study of subjects such as architecture, design, social history and genealogy for present and future generations of Australians.

By virtue of its early date of commencement (1821, prior to the commencement of civil registration of births, deaths and marriages in NSW), historical associations and surviving monuments, the Allman Hill Burying Ground possesses rare aspects of NSW's cultural history. Each cemetery is unique since it contains the buried remains of persons different from any other place.

The Allman Hill Burying Ground demonstrates the principle characteristics of a class of the cultural places of New South Wales. It is representative of the rare class of early convict era burial grounds.

Port Macquarie First Burying Ground was listed on the New South Wales State Heritage Register on 1 July 2005 having satisfied the following criteria.

The place is important in demonstrating the course, or pattern, of cultural or natural history in New South Wales.

The Allman Hill Burying Ground is important in the course and pattern of the cultural history of New South Wales because of its historical associations and significant documentary and physical evidence of the evolution of the place, being the burial place for at least 28 persons, whose lives contributed to and enriched the history and development of a significant settlement in New South Wales.

The place has a strong or special association with a person, or group of persons, of importance of cultural or natural history of New South Wales's history.

The Allman Hill Burying Ground is historically significant at a State level for its strong associations with a number of individuals and families important in the development of Port Macquarie and New South Wales.

The place is important in demonstrating aesthetic characteristics and/or a high degree of creative or technical achievement in New South Wales.

The Allman Hill Burying Ground is important in demonstrating aesthetic characteristics in New South Wales. The cemetery exhibits two monumental styles reflecting contemporary approaches to the commemoration of the dead. The setting for the burying ground, on a hillside overlooking the mouth of the Hastings River produces a dramatic cultural landscape with high visual appeal.

The place has strong or special association with a particular community or cultural group in New South Wales for social, cultural or spiritual reasons.

The Allman Hill Burying Ground has strong associations for social and cultural reasons with the past and contemporary community of Port Macquarie, an area settled early in the development of the colony of New South Wales.

The high esteem in which the place is held by a significant group within the community is reflected in the fact that its conservation is widely supported by the local community of Port Macquarie, the site is visited by many tourists to the area and the place is listed on several registers of heritage items.

The place has potential to yield information that will contribute to an understanding of the cultural or natural history of New South Wales.

The Allman Hill Burying Ground has potential to yield information that will contribute to an understanding of NSW's cultural history. The cemetery has considerable educational and interpretative potential as a resource for the study of subjects such as architecture, design, social history and genealogy for present and future generations of Australians.

The place possesses uncommon, rare or endangered aspects of the cultural or natural history of New South Wales.

By virtue of its early date of commencement (1821, prior to the commencement of civil registration of births, deaths and marriages in NSW), historical associations and surviving monuments, the Allman Hill Burying Ground possesses rare aspects of NSW's cultural history. Each cemetery is unique since it contains the buried remains of persons different from any other place.

The place is important in demonstrating the principal characteristics of a class of cultural or natural places/environments in New South Wales.

The Allman Hill Burying Ground demonstrates the principle characteristics of a class of the cultural places of New South Wales. It is representative of the rare class of early convict era burial grounds.
