= WPP AUNZ =

Multinational communications and advertising company

- Company type: Subsidiary
- Industry: Communications; Advertising; Public relations
- Founder: Martin Sorrell (as an advertising company)
- Area served: Oceania, South East Asia
- Services: Integrated networks; media; data and insights; public relations and public affairs; brand consulting; production; health and wellness
- Parent: WPP plc
- Subsidiaries: Hawker Britton; Barton Deakin
- Website: www.wppaunz.com

WPP AUNZ is a multinational communications, advertising, public relations, technology, and commerce holding company headquartered in Australia. It is a subsidiary of the UK conglomerate WPP plc.

It was formed after a merger between WPP and the STW Group in 2016.

== Subsidiaries ==
WPP Government & Public Sector Practice, which owns and controls Hawker Britton, and Barton Deakin.
