= C/T Group =

Australian lobbying firm

Crosby Textor Group
- Industry: Political strategy
- Founder: Mark Textor; Lynton Crosby
- Subsidiaries: CTF Partners
- Website: ctgroup.com

The C|T Group, also referred to as Crosby Textor, is an Australian lobbying firm, private investigations firm, and political consultancy. The firm provides social research, corporate intelligence corporate strategy and political polling services to its clients.

The firm has historically been associated with mainstream right-wing political parties across the world, and has a particularly strong association with the Liberal Party of Australia. In May 2025, CT Group cofounder Mark Textor was described as "Australia's greatest ever political strategist...advising the Prime Ministers of four countries at once". In 2024, an investigation by the Financial Times has exposed that CT Group has provided forged or faked banking records for multiple litigations ongoing in the UK courts, where it was alleged that CT undertook 'industrial-scale forgery" and 'apparent criminality'.

Crosby Textor was founded by Mark Textor and Lynton Crosby. The firm provides its services throughout the world, but its most notable markets are that of Canada, Australia, Britain, Africa, Italy and New Zealand.

== History & operations ==
The firm has been involved in numerous prominent political campaigns; providing polling and strategy services to political parties. The clientele of the firm has historically been right wing.

Examples of political campaigns in which the firm has operated include:

- The failed "Yes" Campaign in the 2023 Australian Referendum, also known as Yes23
- Boris Johnson's successful London Mayoral campaign in 2008.
- Liberal party operations and strategy for the 2010, 2013 Australian federal election, 2016 Australian federal election, and 2022 Australian federal election campaigns.
- Campbell Newman's Liberal National Party election campaign in the 2012 Queensland election.
- The 2012 Northern Territory election, which was won by the Country Liberal Party.
- In 2014 the firm published polling which demonstrated that most Australians were in favour of legalising same-sex marriage. In June 2020, the firm undertook polling research in relation to the proposed Indigenous voice to Parliament; finding that a majority of Australians support a constitutionally enshrined Voice to Parliament.
- In 2017 British Prime Minister Theresa May announced that Crosby would play a leading role in the Conservatives' campaign for the 2017 general election. The Conservatives failed to secure an outright majority and author Hannah Jane described Crosby as running a "disastrous, horrendously negative campaign".
- In 2019, an investigation by The Guardian revealed that to further the political objectives of its clients, C|T Group created ostensibly independent social media accounts behind adverts on Facebook to promote political ideas, such as promoting a hard Brexit which were in fact administered by employees of CTF Partners (a subsidiary).

== See also ==
- Isaac Levido
- Hawker Britton
- Mark Fullbrook
