= Hawker Britton =

Australian lobbying and political consulting firm

- Type: Subsidiary
- Industry: Government relations, lobbying, communications
- Founder: Bruce Hawker, David Britton
- Headquarters: Canberra
- Parent: WPP AUNZ, WPP plc
- Website: http://www.hawkerbritton.com/

Hawker Britton is a lobbying and political consulting firm, headquartered in Australia. It is known to have influence with the Australian Labor Party.

It has the largest number of clients on the Australian Government Federal Lobbyist Register, and has multiple offices in Australia and New Zealand. It is majority owned by WPP AUNZ, a marketing conglomerate headquartered in Australia, New Zealand, and South East Asia; itself a subsidiary of the WPP plc conglomerate.

== Corporate history ==
Hawker Britton was established in 1997 by Bruce Hawker and David Britton. Before starting the company, Hawker was chief of staff to New South Wales Premier Bob Carr, and Britton was Carr's senior media advisor.

The firm has provided political campaign consultancy services for more than thirty elections. Britton left in 2005 and Hawker left in December 2010.

=== Contemporary management ===
The current managing director is Justin Di Lollo, a former staffer to Labor leader Kim Beazley. Di Lollo also heads the STW Group government relations function. Simon Banks is the company's federal director.

== Clients ==
In South Australia, some of Hawker Britton's clients include: Adelaide Airport, APA Group, Bunnings, Engie, Expedia, Fantastic Furniture, Free TV, Heathgate Resources, Hewlett Packard Enterprise, Liberty Steel Group, Lockheed Martin, McDonald's, Medibank, Motorola, Officeworks, QBE, Red Bull, and Serco.

== See also ==
- C/T Group
