= Francis Allman =

British Army officer

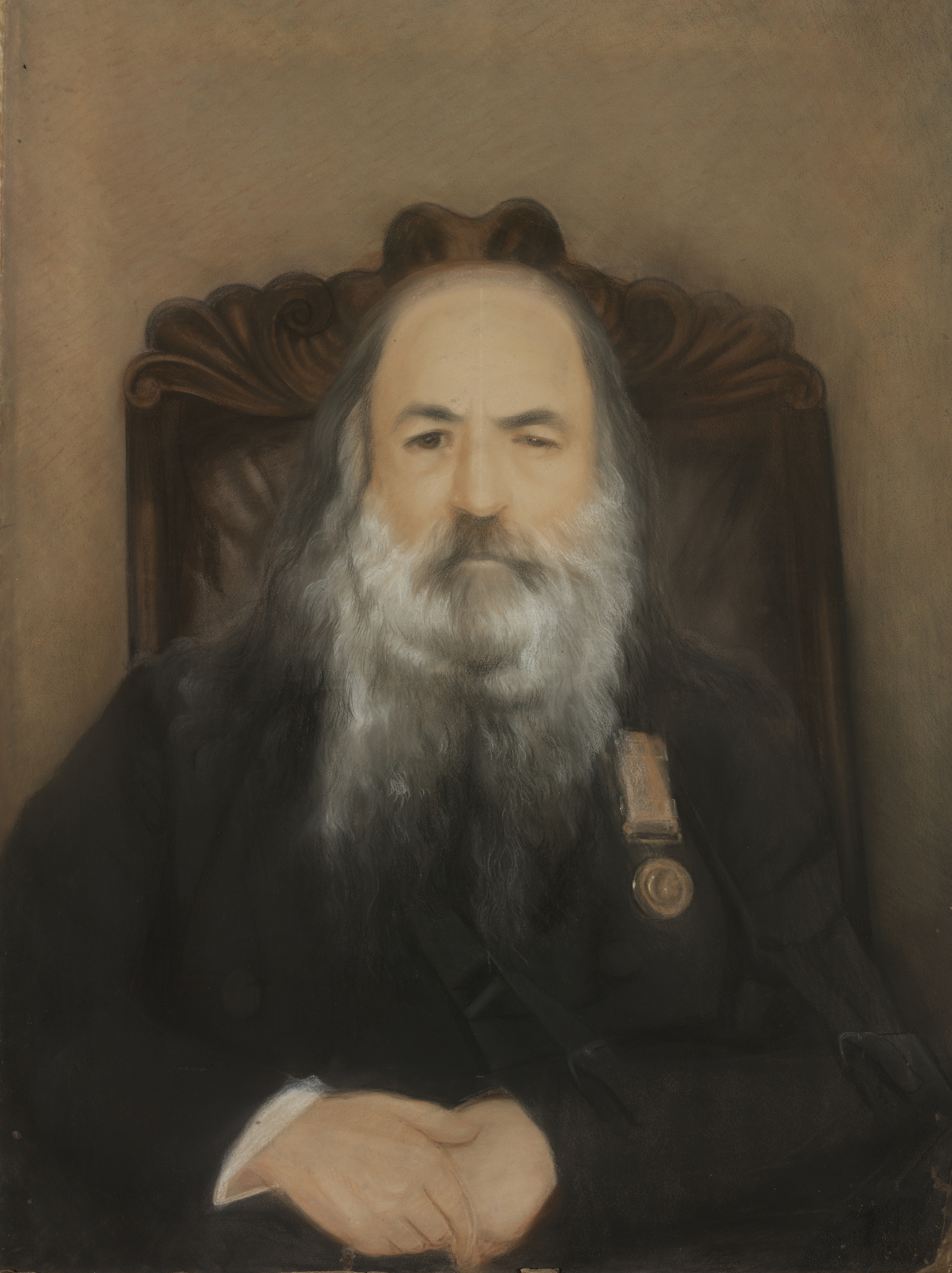
- Captain Francis Allman, ca 1821-1852, attributed to James Armstrong Wilson
- Born: 1 November 1780; County Clare, Ireland
- Died: 24 October 1860 (aged 79); Yass, New South Wales, Australia
- Military career
- Branch: Queen's Royal Regiment
- Service years: 1794-1824
- Rank: Captain
- Unit: 48th Regiment
- Commands: Port Macquarie, Newcastle, New South Wales
- Conflicts: Peninsular War
- Other work: Farmer, Magistrate

Francis Allman was a commissioned officer of the British Army and was born in County Clare, Ireland on 1 November 1780. He enlisted as an ensign in the Queen's Royal Regiment of Foot with his brother John in 1794.

In 1803, he joined the 48th (Northamptonshire) Regiment of Foot as a lieutenant. He was active during the Peninsular War (1807–1814), and fought in the Battle of Talavera and the Battle of Albuera. He received a severe sabre wound to the head at Albuera which led to his capture by the French who held him prisoner at Verdun until 1815. In 1807 he married Sarah Wilson in Gibraltar and by the time he emigrated to Australia they had three children.

== Commandant at Port Macquarie ==
On 30 April 1818, Allman arrived at Sydney in the Colony of New South Wales in command of a detachment of the 48th Regiment.

In 1821, the Governor of New South Wales, Lachlan Macquarie, decided to create a convict settlement at Port Macquarie, some 390 kilometres north of Sydney. Allman was appointed Commandant and magistrate of the convict settlement which consisted initially of 41 soldiers and 60 convicts who had been selected for their 'good conduct'. They left Sydney on 17 March 1821 but on the voyage most of the Allman family's possessions were washed overboard causing them added hardship once they arrived at Port Macquarie. Allman and his family remained at Port Macquarie until April 1824 and over that time he directed the establishment of the settlement and pioneered the sugar-cane production at the outpost.

== Commandant of Newcastle ==
Once he returned to Sydney he returned to his normal duties before retiring on half-pay in December 1824 and being appointed Commandant at Newcastle. In this role, he oversaw operations of the New South Wales Mounted Police targeting Aboriginal resistance in the Hunter Valley. Frequent extrajudicial killings and the massacre of eighteen Indigenous people subsequently occurred and Allman was directed by Governor Ralph Darling to head an inquiry into these killings. The main officer investigated, Lieutenant Nathaniel Lowe, was cleared of any wrongdoing in Allman's inquiries.

== Pastoralist and police magistrate ==
Governor Darling abolished the office of Commandant at Newcastle in 1826 and Allman decided to take up farming on his grant of 2560 acres (1036 ha) near Muswellbrook. By 1828 Allman was living in Wallis Plains with his wife Sarah, aged 41; John James, aged 16; Francis William, aged 14; Sarah, aged 12; Maria, aged 10; Harriet, aged 8; George, aged 6; Frederick, aged 1. He continued to serve as a magistrate and in 1832 was appointed police magistrate for the Illawarra region in New South Wales. In March 1834 he took up the same role in Goulburn and at Campbelltown in July 1836. In February 1843 he was appointed as magistrate at Berrima.

== Later years and death ==
Even with these appointments Allman appears to have found it hard to get ahead in the Colony and much of his life was spent in efforts to improve the prospects for his family. In June 1844 financial difficulties led him into bankruptcy and forced him to resign his position. He retired to Yass, a town in south-eastern New South Wales where he died on 24 October 1860. He was buried with military honours in the Church of England cemetery.

== Legacy ==
Captain Francis Allman Expedition Monument. Horton Street, The Town Green, Port Macquarie, 2444. Inscription . 'Near this place on 17 and 18 April 1821 were moored the vessels Lady Nelson, Mermaid and Prince Regent which convened the first detachment of troops and convicts to this District under the first commandant Capt. Francis Allman 48th Regt."

John James Allman, who was one Francis' sons, settled in the Yarrowich Valley in 1836 and was later joined by his brother Francis (jnr.). In 1840 they sold their occupancies to Mr. Todd and Mr. Fenwick. John James Allman became a Commissioner of Crown Lands and headed a detachment of Border Police, while in April 1856 Francis Allman (jnr.) was appointed to be a Sub-Lieutenant of the Native Police.
