= Port Macquarie Second Burying Ground =

Australian cemetery

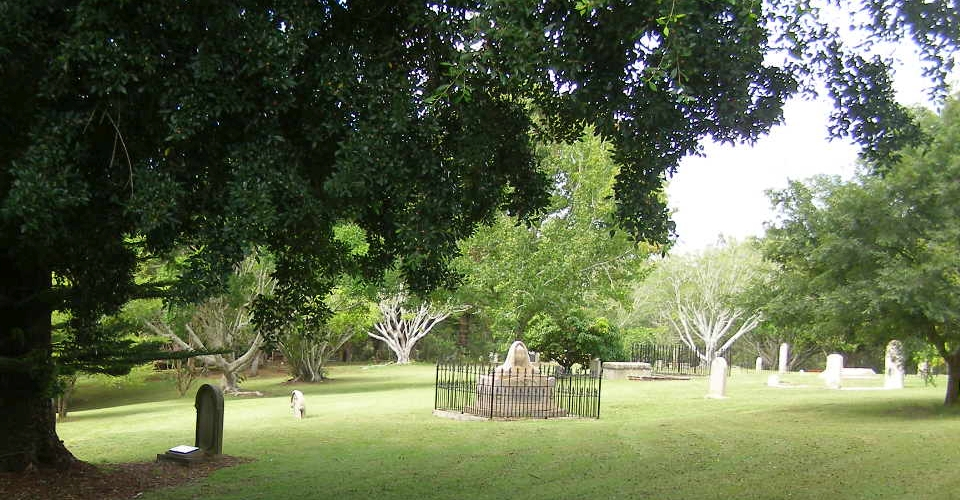
- Port Macquarie Second Burying Ground, 2010

- Location within New South Wales Location within Australia
- 31.4347°S 152.9083°E
- Location: Gordon Street, Port Macquarie, Port Macquarie-Hastings Council, New South Wales, Australia

History
- Built: 1824–1886

Site notes
- Owner: Port Macquarie-Hastings Council

New South Wales Heritage Register
- Official name: Port Macquarie Second Burying Ground 1824–1886; Second Burial Ground; Historic Cemetery
- Type: state heritage (landscape)
- Designated: 1 July 2005
- Reference no.: 1731
- Type: Cemetery/Graveyard/Burial Ground
- Category: Cemeteries and Burial Sites
- Builders: Various stonemasons

Port Macquarie Second Burying Ground is a heritage-listed former cemetery at Gordon Street, Port Macquarie, Port Macquarie-Hastings Council, New South Wales, Australia. It was in use from 1824 to 1886. The property is owned by Port Macquarie-Hastings Council (Local Government). It was added to the New South Wales State Heritage Register on 1 July 2005.

== History ==
The dramatic rise in the population of Port Macquarie and consequent increase in deaths, required authorities to select a new burying ground to replace the first one on Allman Hill, overlooking the mouth of the Hastings River. The site chosen was a peninsula of ground south of the settlement, at the confluence of the present Wrights and Kooloonbung Creeks. The four acre site selected had been described by John Oxley in 1818 as being bushy, and hence must have been cleared for the purposes of a cemetery. The first burial, that of an infant, Elizabeth Murphy, took place towards the south end of the peninsula on 15 November 1824.

The Second Burying Ground was dedicated as a Reserve for the Preservation of Graves on 2 July 1863. Between 1824 and 1886, when the cemetery was closed to burials, some 1,400 individuals were interred there, many of them convicts from the early penal settlement.

On 21 December 1910, the Second Burying Ground was formally dedicated for the Preservation of Graves. The conditions of the cemetery deteriorated for several decades, and it was not until the 1960s that efforts were made to restore and recognise the significance of the cemetery as the last resting place of many of those who had contributed to the establishment and development of Port Macquarie and the Hastings district. Unfortunately by this time many of the burial sites had become obscured and most monuments had fallen into disrepair. Today only 92 funerary monuments or parts thereof remain on site.

A memorial plaque to those interred was erected in April 1963. In the 1980s, the site was converted to a nature park with planting of ornamental trees and shrubs, the construction of a brick pathway, erection of directional signage and some interpretative signs. A pavilion, interpretative shelter and toilet block were erected c. 1990s. Some significant monuments were restored in the early 1990s.

== Description ==
The Second Burying Ground occupies a hilly peninsula at the southern edge of the commercial area of Port Macquarie, north of the confluence of the present day Wrights and Kooloonbung Creeks. The northern edge of the cemetery is defined by Gordon Street, a major east–west thoroughfare in the town and the other three sides of the cemetery adjoin the Kooloonbung nature Park, an area of conserved wetland, arboretum and parkland.

The cemetery was reported to generally be in good condition as at 23 February 2010. It is managed as an historic site and public parkland, with surviving monuments scattered through the landscape. A perimeter brick path provides access around the cemetery and through the town centre to the nature Park. Many of the monuments have been set in concrete slabs. While this may have protected some of them from damage as a result of vandalism, it has exacerbated rising damp problems in susceptible sandstone and has a negative visual impact on the cultural landscape. None of the original path network is visible and most of the approximately 1,400 burials are unmarked. The burial area is likely to have extended a considerable distance beyond the present area occupied by monuments i.e. on the slopes of the hill. The site has considerable archaeological potential.

Whilst the cemetery has lost much of its original fabric, it retains many early monuments including those from the convict era at Port Macquarie.

== Heritage listing ==
The cultural landscape at the Second Burying Ground is of State heritage significance. The cemetery is a place possessing historical, social, architectural, cultural, aesthetic and archaeological significance for the Hastings region and the State of New South Wales.

The Second Burying Ground is important in the course and pattern of the cultural history of New South Wales because of its historical associations and significant documentary and physical evidence of the evolution of the place, being the burial place for at least 1,400, whose lives contributed to and enriched the history and development of a significant area of New South Wales. In its layout and monuments it demonstrates the religious philosophies and changing attitudes to death and its commemoration by a significant sample of the Australian population over a period of more than 170 years.

The Second Burying Ground is historically significant at a State level for its strong associations with a number of individuals and families important in the development of Port Macquarie and New South Wales.

The Second Burying Ground is important in demonstrating aesthetic characteristics in New South Wales.

The Second Burying Ground has strong associations for social and cultural reasons with the past and contemporary community of Port Macquarie, an area settled early in the development of the colony of New South Wales.

The high esteem in which the place is held by a significant group within the community is reflected in the fact that it is still used by the local community of Port Macquarie and is listed on several registers of heritage items.

The Second Burying Ground has potential to yield information that will contribute to an understanding of NSW's cultural history. The cemetery has considerable educational and interpretative potential as a resource for the study of subjects such as landscape design, funerary monuments, social history and genealogy for present and future generations of Australians.

By virtue of its early date of commencement (1824, well prior to the commencement of civil registration of births, deaths and marriages in NSW), historical associations and surviving monuments, the Second Burying Ground possesses rare aspects of NSW's cultural history. Each cemetery is unique since it contains the buried remains of persons different from any other place.

The Second Burying Ground demonstrates the principle characteristics of a class of the cultural places of New South Wales. It is representative of early convict era burial grounds. It demonstrates funerary monument styles and approaches to management of small cemeteries over a significant period of time.

Port Macquarie Second Burying Ground was listed on the New South Wales State Heritage Register on 1 July 2005 having satisfied the following criteria.

The place is important in demonstrating the course, or pattern, of cultural or natural history in New South Wales.

The Second Burying Ground is important in the course and pattern of the cultural history of New South Wales because of its historical associations and significant documentary and physical evidence of the evolution of the place, being the burial place for at least 1,400 individuals whose lives contributed to and enriched the history and development of a significant area of New South Wales. In its layout and monuments it demonstrates the religious philosophies and changing attitudes to death and its commemoration by a significant sample of the Australian population over a period of more than 170 years.

The place has a strong or special association with a person, or group of persons, of importance of cultural or natural history of New South Wales's history.

The Second Burying Ground is historically significant at a State level for its strong associations with a number of individuals and families important in the development of Port Macquarie and New South Wales.

The place is important in demonstrating aesthetic characteristics and/or a high degree of creative or technical achievement in New South Wales.

The Second Burying Ground is important in demonstrating aesthetic characteristics in New South Wales. The cemetery exhibits a range of monumental styles reflecting changing approaches to the commemoration of the dead in a number of religious denominations.

The place has strong or special association with a particular community or cultural group in New South Wales for social, cultural or spiritual reasons.

The Second Burying Ground has strong associations for social and cultural reasons with the past and contemporary community of Port Macquarie, an area settled early in the development of the colony of New South Wales.

The high esteem in which the place is held by a significant group within the community is reflected in the fact that it is still regularly visited by the local community of Port Macquarie and is listed on several registers of heritage items.

The place has potential to yield information that will contribute to an understanding of the cultural or natural history of New South Wales.

The Second Burying Ground has potential to yield information that will contribute to an understanding of NSW's cultural history. The cemetery has considerable educational and interpretative potential as a resource for the study of subjects such as landscape design, funerary monuments, social history and genealogy for present and future generations of Australians.

The place possesses uncommon, rare or endangered aspects of the cultural or natural history of New South Wales.

By virtue of its early date of commencement (1824, well prior to the commencement of civil registration of births, deaths and marriages in NSW), historical associations and surviving monuments, the Second Burying Ground possesses rare aspects of NSW's cultural history. Each cemetery is unique since it contains the buried remains of persons different from any other place.

The place is important in demonstrating the principal characteristics of a class of cultural or natural places/environments in New South Wales.

The Second Burying Ground demonstrates the principle characteristics of a class of the cultural places of New South Wales. It is representative of early convict era burial grounds. It demonstrates funerary monument styles and approaches to management of small cemeteries over a significant period of time.
