= Lynton Crosby =

Australian political strategist

Sir Lynton Crosby AO
- Born: Lynton Keith Crosby; 23 August 1956 (age 70); Kadina, Australia
- Education: University of Adelaide (BEcon)
- Occupation: Political strategist
- Political party: Liberal Party of Australia

Sir Lynton Keith Crosby AO (born 23 August 1956) is an Australian political strategist who has managed election campaigns for right-of-centre parties in several countries.

Crosby has been described as a "master of the dark political arts", "the Wizard of Oz", and "the Australian Karl Rove". In 2002, he was called "one of the most powerful and influential figures in the nation" by The Age.

After graduating from the University of Adelaide, Crosby first became involved in politics with the Liberal Party of Australia, eventually being appointed federal director of the party in 1997. He oversaw the party's successful campaigns at the 1996, 1998, 2001, and 2004 federal elections, which made the Howard government Australia's second-longest serving federal government. In 2002, Crosby left his formal position in the party to establish a consulting firm, the Crosby Textor Group.

Crosby first ventured into overseas politics at the 2005 United Kingdom general election, where he managed the Conservative Party's unsuccessful campaign. He has since also run Conservative campaigns for the 2008 and 2012 London mayoral elections, as well as the 2015 general election, all of which resulted in victories for the party. His campaign was not successful for the 2016 London mayoral election (which was won by the Labour candidate, Sadiq Khan) and the 2017 general election in which the Conservatives remained the largest party but lost 13 seats and their parliamentary majority.

Outside of Australia and the UK, Crosby has also served as an advisor for parties in Canada, New Zealand, and Sri Lanka. At the 2009 European Parliament elections, Crosby acted as a consultant for Libertas, a European political party opposed to the Treaty of Lisbon.

== Early life and career ==
Crosby was born in Kadina, South Australia, and grew up in a rural area of the state, where his father Dudley Crosby worked as a cereal farmer and an arts and crafts shop-owner. He studied economics at the University of Adelaide.

== Political career ==
=== Early career & Australia ===
Crosby started his career in 1976 as a market analyst with Golden Fleece Petroleum. He then moved into politics as a research assistant in 1978 for Senator Baden Teague. In 1980, Crosby became executive assistant to Harold Allison, then Minister of Education and Aboriginal Affairs. Crosby became executive assistant to Martin Cameron in 1992, then Leader of the Opposition in the South Australian Legislative Council. Between 1986 and 1991, Crosby held a number of corporate affairs positions in the Australian private sector.

At the 1982 South Australian election, Crosby unsuccessfully ran for the Liberals in the House of Assembly seat of Norwood. Suffering a 9.2 percent two-party swing compared to the statewide swing of 5.9 percent, he later joked that he "turned a marginal Labor seat into a safe Labor seat after campaigning there."

In 1991, Crosby became state director for the Queensland division of the Liberal Party of Australia, and in 1994 the party's deputy federal director. He served under federal director Andrew Robb, until replacing him as federal director of the Liberal Party in May 1997. Crosby served as campaign director for the party at the 1996, 1998, 2001, and 2004 federal elections. In 1998, the government won with marginal seats (swing seats) targeted by Crosby. The election saw the smallest two-party-preferred margin win since 1949 estimates, on 49.02 percent.

In 2002, Crosby established an election consulting firm, the Crosby Textor Group (now C|T Group), with an associate, Mark Textor. As a result, he left his position with the Liberal Party. Crosby was also involved in setting up CT Financial, an investor relations and financial communications specialist consultancy, in 2006.

=== C|T Group and UK politics ===
Crosby managed the Conservative Party's 2005 United Kingdom general election campaign, but was unable to help leader Michael Howard defeat the incumbent Prime Minister Tony Blair. During Crosby's time as campaign manager, the Conservatives used attention-grabbing slogans such as "It's Not Racist to Impose Limits on Immigration" and "How Would You Feel if a Bloke on Early Release Attacked Your Daughter?"

Crosby was also appointed to run Conservative Boris Johnson's successful 2008 London mayoral election campaign, at a cost to the party of £140,000 for four months of work.

In March 2009, it was announced that Crosby would direct the Europe-wide Libertas campaign for the June 2009 European Parliament elections. Despite running 600 candidates, the movement only managed to get one MEP elected, and folded shortly after.

In November 2012, Crosby sued Mike Kelly, an Australian parliamentary secretary for defence, for libel for alleging on Twitter that Crosby had used push polling.

In July 2013, following the government's rejection of a plan to remove branding from cigarette packets, British Prime Minister David Cameron was urged by Liberal Democrat members of the governing coalition to sack Crosby as his chief election strategist because of Crosby's connection to the tobacco industry. Liberal Democrat MP Paul Burstow was quoted as saying: "Lynton Crosby cannot remain at the heart of government while he is also serving the interests of the tobacco industry. If he does not go, the Prime Minister should sack him." In July 2013, it was reported in The Guardian and elsewhere that Crosby Textor, the company which he co-founded (which is known as CTF Partners in the UK) had advised private healthcare providers on how to exploit perceived "failings" in the National Health Service in 2010. Crosby issued The Guardian with a legal challenge over their reporting. The issue resurfaced in mainstream news sources a few days before the 2015 UK general election.

In 2014, it was revealed that having been hired in 2012 by Philip Morris International, maker of Marlboro cigarettes, Crosby lobbied Lord Marland, then parliamentary undersecretary for intellectual property and a former Conservative party treasurer, to oppose the introduction of plain packaging on cigarettes. This revelation came in papers released under the Freedom of Information Act by the Intellectual Property Office. According to investigative journalist Nicky Hager, Crosby was an adviser to the former Prime Minister of New Zealand, John Key.

During the 2015 Sri Lankan parliamentary election, Crosby was an advisor to incumbent Prime Minister Ranil Wickremesinghe, whose United National Front captured a plurality of seats and formed a governing coalition along with President Maithripala Sirisena's Sri Lanka Freedom Party. The campaign featured widespread adverts that contrasted "good governance" offered by the incumbent Prime Minister with the "jungle law" of former President Mahinda Rajapaksa, whose ten-year rule was marked by family corruption and strident nationalism after the 2009 defeat of the Tamil Tigers. In September, Canadian press linked Crosby to the Canadian Conservative Party, with reports suggesting he was working as a strategist during the election. Both Crosby and his partner rejected claims Crosby or anyone at CT Group was involved in the Canadian election.

In December 2015, it was announced that Crosby was to be included in the Queen's New Year Honours list and would receive his knighthood for his political services. Members of the Labour party were critical of the move, with opposition leader Jeremy Corbyn even threatening to overhaul the British honours system if he was ever elected.

After the European Union referendum of 2016 had been won by Leave, led by Johnson and Michael Gove, David Cameron resigned as party leader and Gove told Johnson he would support him for the leadership. Johnson at once launched a leadership campaign, which was run by Crosby and Ben Wallace. However, a week later, on 30 June 2016, Gove announced that he was running himself, and Johnson withdrew.

In April 2017, Prime Minister Theresa May announced that Crosby would play a leading role in the Conservatives' campaign for the 2017 general election, which May had called early. May failed to secure an outright Conservative majority and author Hannah Jane described Crosby as running a "disastrous, horrendously negative campaign".

On 3 October 2017, during the Conservative Party Conference, it was reported that Amber Rudd had hired Crosby, amid speculation that she was planning to launch a bid for leadership of the party.

In 2018, Crosby allegedly contacted Boris Johnson in an attempt to force a leadership battle against May to "destroy" her flagship Brexit policy, which he viewed as a betrayal of the Brexit voters. The press also suggested that his opposition to May's deal was "revenge" for her blaming seat losses at the 2017 general election on him.

In 2019, The Guardian announced it had seen documents revealing that multiple outwardly independent groups behind adverts on Facebook promoting a hard Brexit were administrated by employees of Crosby's lobbying firm, CTF Partners.

== Tactics ==
Crosby is described as favouring what is called a wedge strategy, whereby the party he advises introduces a divisive or controversial social issue into a campaign, aligning its own stance with the dissenting faction of its opponent party, with the goal of causing vitriolic debate inside the opposing party, defection of its supporters, and the legitimising of sentiment which had previously been considered inappropriate. This is also described as "below the radar" or dog-whistle campaigning. Crosby has combined this with the targeting of marginal constituencies and highly localised campaigning, latching on to local issues and personalities. To find such divisive and potentially deflecting issues, Crosby's business partner Mark Textor runs focus groups to find which groups to target with what questions. Crosby is said to run a tight ship, focus on simple messages, target marginal constituencies and use lots of polls.

=== Dead cat theory ===
In a 2013 article for The Daily Telegraph, Boris Johnson noted that one of Crosby's tactics when losing an argument because the facts did not support him was to do the equivalent of "throwing a dead cat on the table", by bringing up a new issue that drew widespread attention from the populace, forcing opponents to also talk about the new issue instead of the previous issue. According to the Guardian, Michael Fallon was the implementer of the strategy in 2015 when he accused Ed Miliband of preparing to drop Trident as part of a deal with the Scottish National Party at a moment when the Labour party were starting to pull ahead in the polls.

== Personal life ==
Crosby is married to Dawn Heinrich, an Australian, with whom he has two adult daughters: Tara and Emma. Crosby and his wife are UK residents. South Australian farmer and businessman John Crosby is his cousin.

== Honours ==
In 2005, Crosby was appointed an Officer of the Order of Australia (postnominals AO), for "service to politics". He had previously received the Australian government's Centenary Medal, for "service to Australian society through politics".

Crosby was knighted in the UK's 2016 New Year Honours "for political service". The honour sparked criticism from figures in the Labour Party and Liberal Democrats, who accused Cameron's government of engaging in political cronyism. Crosby's supporters note that Spencer Livermore, a strategist for the Labour Party, had been awarded a life peerage earlier in the year.

== See also ==
- Isaac Levido
