= Ballengarra, New South Wales =

Locality in New South Wales, Australia

Ballengarra New South Wales
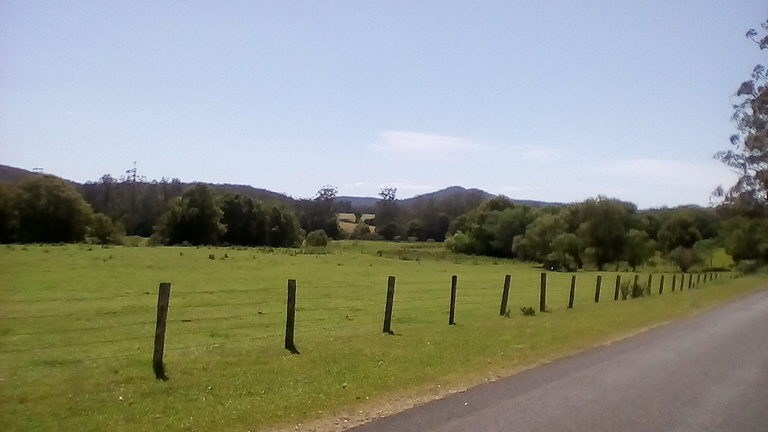
- Ballengara and Coga Parish, Macquarie County.

- Coordinates: 31°19′S 152°45′E
- Population: 97 (SAL 2021)
- LGA(s): Port Macquarie-Hastings Council
- State electorate(s): Oxley
- Federal division(s): Lyne

Ballengarra is a bounded rural locality of Mid-Coast Council New South Wales and a civil parish of Macquarie County on the Mid North Coast.
