= Hastings Historical Society Museum =

- Location within New South Wales
- 31.4294°S 152.9101°E
- Location: 22 Clarence Street, Port Macquarie, Port Macquarie-Hastings Council, New South Wales, Australia

History
- Built: 1835–1840

Site notes
- Owner: Port Macquarie Historical Society
- Website: portmuseum.org.au

New South Wales Heritage Register
- Official name: Hastings Historical Society Museum; Port Macquarie Historical Society Museum; Port Macquarie Museum; Store and residence
- Type: State heritage (built)
- Designated: 2 April 1999
- Reference no.: 326
- Type: Other – Commercial
- Category: Commercial
- Builders: William Stokes

Hastings Historical Society Museum is a heritage-listed building at 22 Clarence Street, Port Macquarie, in the Mid North Coast region of New South Wales, Australia. It was built as a retail store from 1835 to 1840 by William Stokes. The premises, which is maintained by the Historical Society is alternatively known as the Port Macquarie Historical Society Museum and Port Macquarie Museum. It was added to the New South Wales State Heritage Register on 2 April 1999.

== History ==
The museum building was used as a store until well into the twentieth century. The block of land on which the Museum now stands was purchased at auction by Edward McRoberts on 14 February 1834 for 13 pounds 8 shillings, 8 pence. The titles were issued to him on 22 December 1834.

The older western portion of this building was probably erected between 1835 and 1840. It was owned by Mr W. Stokes sometime after 1834 but little is known until 17 January 1853 when Samuel H. and Elizabeth Cohen, storekeepers, sold out to William Killion, another storekeeper, for 75 pounds.

He in turn sold out to another storekeeper, James H. Young on 25 January 1868 for 60 pounds. Young sold to Francis Marchment on 6 September 1881 for 120 pounds and it was about this time that the eastern section was added. The property remained in the marchment family until sold to A. P. Hayward on 14 January 1925.

Francis Marchment (1843-1923) occupied this building from 1881 to 1925. He immigrated from Gloucestershire in 1862 and arrived in Port Macquarie in 1869 with his partner George Day. They procured a 3 tonne cutter and traded extensively on the Hastings River particularly to Rawdon Island and Beechwood. Day sold out after a short time. Trade was chiefly by barter, the settlers providing cedar logs, hides, poultry and corn in return for sugar, flour, tea, salt and clothes. The cedar logs were towed in rafts behind the cutter. His traders horn was a welcome sound to the settlers along the river, as his cutter was the only contact with the outside world and for fresh supplies.

He met his wife Christina Newberry 1855-1911 at Rawdon Island. There was a family of seven sons and two daughters most of whom were born in this building.

It was taken over by the Hastings Historical Society in 1959 and progressively reconstructed with major additions in 1968 and 1977. During the initial renovations and restoration evidence of alterations during its earlier existence were found together with foundation bricks bearing arrows and other convict marks. Later extensions have been made to accommodate additional research, storage and display areas and office space.

In 2013 the Society commissioned a Cultural Tourism Plan from Kevin Williams of Sydney Scenes, with a grant from the Office of Environment & Heritage. A copy was lodged with the Heritage Council in 2014 and it made recommendations to improve the museum's sustainability.

== Description ==
The architectural style is Old Colonial Georgian. It is a simple two-story building of painted brick construction (hand-made bricks) with hipped iron roof over the original shingles and two chimneys. The roof was formerly gable, but changed when a 13 ft extension was made to the eastern end of the building in the late nineteenth century. This extension involved the removal of an internal staircase attached to the eastern wall. A skillion kitchen formerly extended along the southern wall of the building. Ceilings and upstairs internal walls are boarded. The building was derelict when leased by the Hastings District Historical Society in 1959. Restoration included new flooring to the ground floor, new staircase, paintwork and guttering, replacement of fireplace surrounds, and erection of an annexe. Major extensions were made on the south side in 1968 and in 1977. There were further extensions to the rear of the building in 1988.

The physical condition of the building was reported as excellent as at 11 October 2004. The archaeological potential is medium. Underfloor deposits of convict built bricks have been found during renovation and evidence of earlier building alterations.

=== Modifications and dates ===
- 1834 - store built
- 1880s - extension to eastern end of building
- 1959 - renovated
- 1968 - extension on the south side
- 1977 - extension on the south side
- 1988 - further extensions to the rear of the building

== Heritage listing ==
The museum building demonstrates the form scale and style of development which took place when free settlement was permitted in Port Macquarie. One of the only surviving early commercial and residential buildings in Port Macquarie. Located near other historic buildings such as the Courthouse and The Garrison. As a museum it continues to provide a focus for historical research and heritage within the community.

Hastings Historical Society Museum was listed on the New South Wales State Heritage Register on 2 April 1999.

== See also ==
- Old Port Macquarie Courthouse
- St Thomas' Anglican Church
- Port Macquarie Government House Site
- Port Macquarie First Burying Ground
- Port Macquarie Second Burying Ground
- Overseers' Cottages Remains
- Lake Innes House Ruins
