= Old Port Macquarie Courthouse =

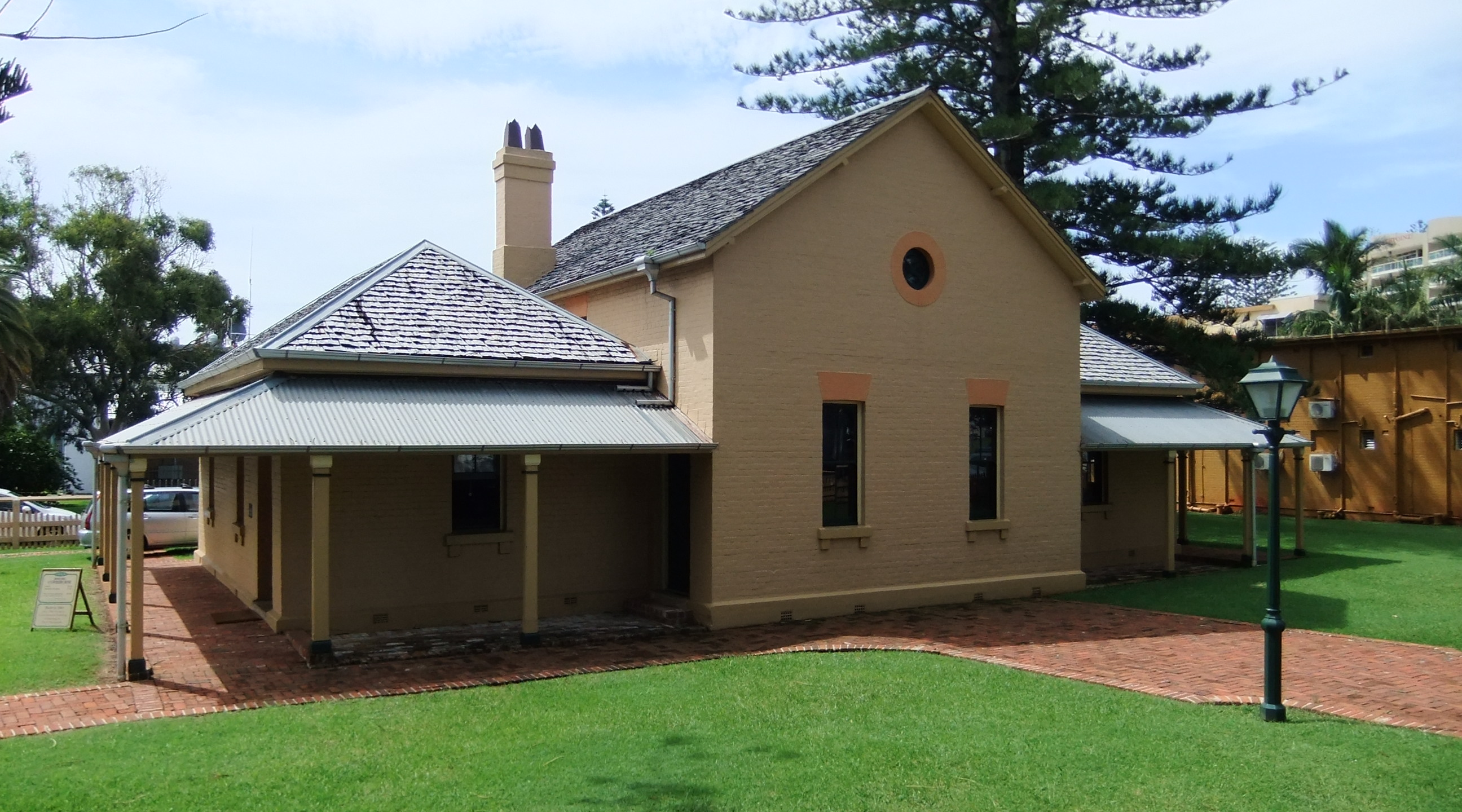

- Location within New South Wales Location within Australia
- 31.4288°S 152.9097°E
- Location: Clarence Street (cnr), Port Macquarie, Port Macquarie-Hastings Council, New South Wales, Australia

History
- Built: 1869

Site notes
- Architect: James Barnet
- Owner: Department of Planning and Infrastructure

New South Wales Heritage Register
- Official name: Courthouse and Norfolk Island pines (former); Clerk of Petty Sessions (former)
- Type: State heritage (complex / group)
- Designated: 2 April 1999
- Reference no.: 554
- Type: Courthouse
- Category: Law enforcement
- Builders: Butler and Bourne

Old Port Macquarie Courthouse is a heritage-listed former courthouse and now justice museum at Clarence Street (cnr), Port Macquarie, Port Macquarie-Hastings Council, New South Wales, Australia. It was designed by James Barnet and built in 1869 by Butler and Bourne. It was added to the New South Wales State Heritage Register on 2 April 1999.

== History ==
The land for the present Courthouse was allotted in the 1830s, during which time Port Macquarie was gazetted for a Court of Petty Sessions. In September 1836, the newly appointed Police Magistrate, William Nairn Gray, recommended that a brick building in Hay Street (occupied by Stephen Partridge) be used as court as the present Police Office was too small and not fit for court.

On 14 August 1838, Port Macquarie was gazetted as a place for trial by jury. During the 1840s complaints were lodged about the dilapidated state of the courthouse. In 1852 repairs to the building were authorised.

In 1865 a letter from Charles Sinclair, Police Magistrate, was sent to the Colonial Architect regarding the poor state of the building.

On 14 September 1867 a notice was placed in the Government Gazette calling for tenders for the erection of a courthouse and lockup at Macquarie. Tenders closed at noon on 8 October 1867.

The building was designed by James Barnet and the builder chosen for the task was Butler and Bourne of Port Macquarie who bid 875 pounds. The acceptance of the tender was announced in the Government Gazette on 25 October 1867.

A journalist who travelled with Sir John Robertson and Mr Forster when they visited Port Macquarie on 12 November 1868, clearly explained the need for a new courthouse in the town by describing the state of the existing building. 'This is a very dilapidated place indeed and looks both externally and internally, as though it was in the very last stages of decay. The verandahs were choked up with piles of bricks, plaster and other debris and the inner walls were as dingy and damp as neglect could make them. This is the place where the "nomination" was to "come off" on the following Monday and I should fancy that it would be the closing scene of this seedy old ruin's career as a courthouse. It is to be degraded into a stable for the police horses and the very magisterial dais itself is to become the depository of cattle fodder.'

The journalist remarked upon the construction underway on the current historic courthouse which was 'within a stone's throw' of the old building. The journalist also noted the omission of jury rooms, an omission that would have a bearing on the ultimate decision to build another courthouse in 1986.

It is a very neat building built of brick and nearly completed. the walls are all but finished and part of the edifice is roofed. A rather awkward mistake, however, has been made in the plan of the courthouse. No provision has been made for the jury rooms and, as these apartments are indispensably necessary they will have to be added to the new building.

The courthouse's construction cost more than anticipated - a total of 109 pounds plus 10 pounds for furniture. The additional cost of 205 pounds was made necessary to overcome dampness. The building opened its doors as a courthouse in 1869.

The first additions were made to the building in 1890 when 303 pounds was spent on extensions on the western wing which was carried out under the control of James Barnet.

1900 photographs reveal the changes to the courthouse with verandahs, the walls in face brick, the roof in slate with galvanised metal cappings and timber floors internally and to the verandahs. The external ground line appears to have been lower.

In 1974 a concrete floor was laid in the court, magistrate's and judge's rooms.

In 1986 the Justice Department vacated the building. A community campaign led to the granting of trusteeship of the building to Hastings Municipal Council. Recognising the significance of the building to the status of Port Macquarie as an important historic town, Council engaged a conservation specialist to prepare a report on its condition and the likely cost of conservation work. Evidence of original finishes was found in early photographs and 100 year old measured drawings, and by researching similar court houses of the period.

Through a grant from the Heritage Properties Restoration Programme and community fundraising the restoration costs were met. Work on the restoration began on 12 February 1993. Concrete floors were removed and replaced by new timber, shingles were reinstated on the roof and second-hand bricks laid under the verandah awning. All joinery was repainted, except for the cedar doors leading into the court room, which were stripped and clear-finished.

The works were completed on 8 October 1993.

Following its reopening by the Premier of New South Wales, the building is now used as a justice museum with interpretive displays depicting the town's early days as a penal settlement.

== Description ==
The block is on the corner of Clarence and Hay Streets. The site has two large mature Norfolk Island pines (Araucaria heterophylla) on the eastern side of the courthouse (which enhance the building's setting). Much of the rest of the surrounds of the building is grassed.

The former court house is a symmetrically planned single storey Victorian Georgian painted brick building of unpretentious form with a central gabled portion (the courtroom) and smaller hipped roofed wings on either side. Roofs are of premium grade bloodwood shingles, with chimneys retaining their metal pots. Doors are four-panelled and windows are large paned. There is a simple verandah with iron roofs to three sides on squared timber posts.

The interior is made up one major room, the Courtroom and originally four, since modified to three, secondary rooms. These rooms contained the Clerk of Petty Sessions on the West Wing and the Magistrates and Judges room on the East wing.

The physical condition of the building was reported as good at 16 October 1997. The archaeological potential was reported as medium, with evidence of convict drains occurring in the eastern part of the site.

The volume and massing of the courthouse have sustained little external change since its initial conception.

== Heritage listing ==
The courthouse reflects the role of Port Macquarie in the late 19th century as a centre of public administration. It is an early example of James Barnet's phase with the Colonial Architect's office and typical of the Victorian Georgian style. It is one of the last 19th century buildings remaining in Port Macquarie. It makes an important contribution to the historic centre of the town and has important relationships with the adjacent Museum, Garrison Centre and Police Lock up buildings.

Courthouse and Norfolk Island pines was listed on the New South Wales State Heritage Register on 2 April 1999 having satisfied the following criteria.

The place is important in demonstrating the course, or pattern, of cultural or natural history in New South Wales.

The courthouse reflects the role of Port Macquarie in the late 19th century as a centre of Public administration. The courthouse is an early work of James Barnet's phase of the Colonial Architect office typical of the Victorian Georgian style. Its date of design in 1867-1869 locates it amongst the earlier examples of Country Court Houses when Barnet had more direct contact with the projects.

The place is important in demonstrating aesthetic characteristics and/or a high degree of creative or technical achievement in New South Wales.

The courthouse contributes to the historic centre of the town including the adjacent museum, Garrison Centre and police lock up buildings. The Norfolk pine trees within the boundary of the site contribute to the natural surrounding of mature, pine trees typical of Port Macquarie.

The place possesses uncommon, rare or endangered aspects of the cultural or natural history of New South Wales.

The courthouse is one of the last nineteenth century government buildings remaining in Port Macquarie.

The place is important in demonstrating the principal characteristics of a class of cultural or natural places/environments in New South Wales.

The courthouse is representative of the architectural simplicity of the area compared to other towns and areas in NSW.

== See also ==
- Hastings Historical Society Museum
- Port Macquarie Government House Site
- Overseers' Cottages Remains
