= Glen Alice =

- Town
- Coordinates: 33°02′35″S 150°12′53″E
- Country: Australia
- State: New South Wales
- LGA: City of Lithgow

Government
  - State electorate: Bathurst
  - Federal division: Calare

Population
  - Total: 56 (2021 census)
- Annual rainfall: 631.9 mm (24.88 in)

Glen Alice is a village in the Central West region of New South Wales, Australia. The village is located in the local government area of the City of Lithgow. At the 2021 census, Glen Alice had a population of 56.

== History ==
In 1834 the family of the diarist Annabella Boswell moved here. They sold their interest after Annabella's father died in 1839.
