= Annabella Boswell =

Australian diarist (1826–1914)

Annabella Alexandrina Campbell Boswell
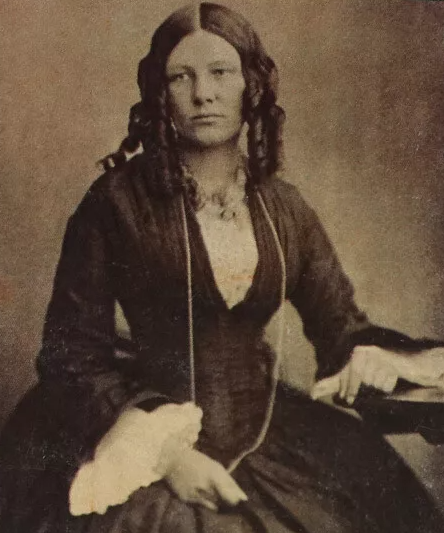
- date unknown
- Born: Annabella Alexandrina Campbell Innes; 16 September 1826; Bathurst plains
- Died: 25 October 1914 (aged 88); Garrallan
- Occupation: gentlewoman
- Known for: her diary and writing

Annabella Alexandrina Campbell Boswell born Annabella Alexandrina Campbell Innes (16 September 1826 – 25 October 1914) was an Australian diarist and gentlewoman.

== Life ==
Boswell was born in the valley of the Macquarie River known as the Bathurst plains in 1826. When she was about eight, she and her family moved to a cattle station they owned called Glen Alice, at Capertee. She was able to be educated at Bridge Street in Sydney at Miss Evans's boarding school for a year. Her mother was Georgianna Lorn Moorshead (born Campbell) and her father was George Innes and they held land. After she left the boarding school, her parents employed governesses. Her writings survive from when she was sixteen.

In 1839, her father died after he had moved them to Port Macquarie in an unsuccessful attempt to regain his health. Her mother sold the property at Capertee, and by 1843, they were back at Port Macquarie where her father's brother, Archibald Clunes Innes, lived. Her uncle was a successful entrepreneur using convict labour to grow food that he sold to feed the convicts. They lived at Lake Innes House. She was interested in novels and history, and she was able to borrow books from the distant Sydney Library. She began to write. Until 1848, she lived a life of sketching and writing while she assisted her uncle as he and his many servants entertained guests, including the governor.

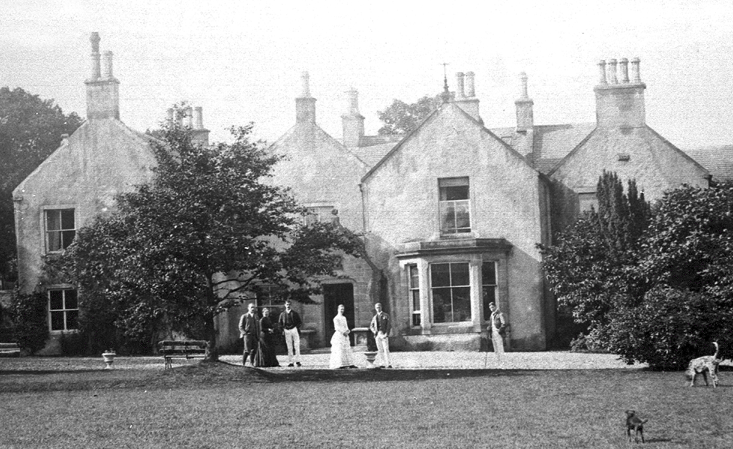
Garrallan House in the 1880s

On 17 June 1856, she was in Newcastle Cathedral where she married Patrick Charles Douglas Boswell, an accountant working for the Bank of New South Wales. He inherited his family's Scottish estate, and in 1867, she was living in Garrallan at Old Cumnock in Ayrshire where their fifth and last child was born.

In 1890, she published a book which describes the lives of people she had met in the 1830s. It was titled Recollections of Some Australian Blacks: Bathurst District, 1835–40. The book described Jacky and Mary, their two sons and their three wives. They were from the Capita tribe and, in a short pamphlet, she described how they spun fur and made rugs from possum skin.

== Death and legacy ==
Boswell died in 1914 at Garrallan. Her journals have been reprinted. Her papers and drawings are of considerable value, and they are recognised by UNESCO because of the insight they give to Australian history. Her papers that were with the Boswell family in Scotland were purchased and brought to Australia.
