= Archibald Clunes Innes =

Australian pastoralist

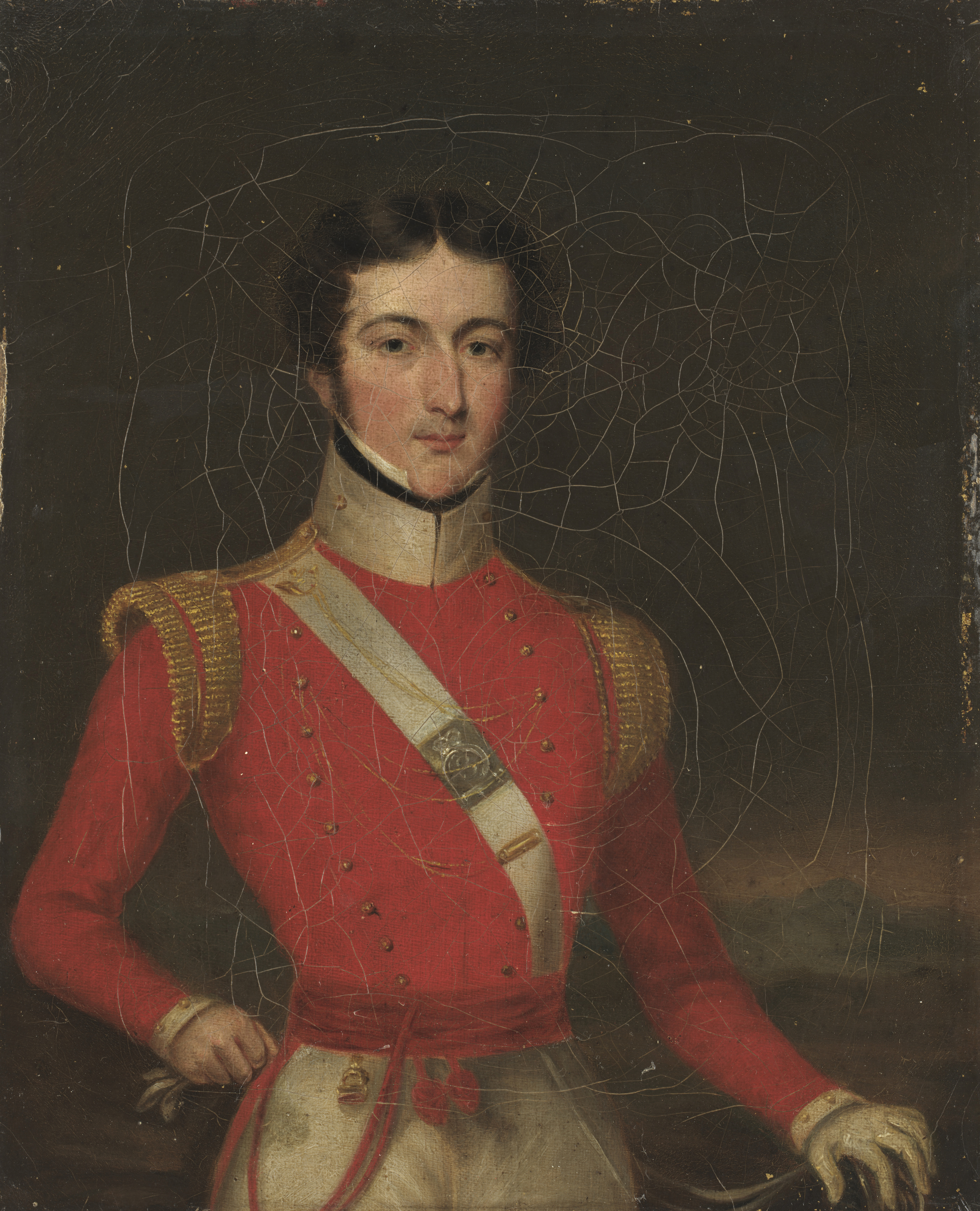
- Major Archibald Clunes Innes, ca. 1813
- Born: 14 May 1799; Thrumster, Caithness, Scotland
- Died: 29 August 1857; Newcastle, New South Wales
- Occupation(s): pastoralist, soldier
- Spouse(s): Margaret, daughter of Alexander Macleay
- Children: three sons and two daughters
- Parent(s): Major James Innes, soldier, and Margaret Clunes

Archibald Clunes Innes (1799–1857) was a soldier and pastoralist from Thrumster, Caithness, Scotland. When he arrived in Australia in 1822 he was a captain in the Third Regiment (Buffs), on the ship Eliza, in charge of 170 convicts.

Innes was a commandant at the Port Macquarie penal settlement from November 1826 to April 1827. He then spent time in Sydney as brigade major before becoming a superintendent of police and magistrate at Parramatta, until 1829. Captain Innes returned in 1830 and settled on his grant of 2,568 acres (1,039 ha) of land near Port Macquarie where the 22-room Lake Innes house was built, using convict labour, in several stages between 1831 and 1843. In 1837 Innes had 85 convicts working for him at Port Macquarie. His wife Margaret, (daughter of Alexander Macleay), was also an early grantee and received land at Crottys Plains on the Wilson River near Rollands Plains.

Major A. C. Innes owned Innestown on the Manning River and Yarrows (Yarras) on the Hastings River. He was one of the first squatters in the New England district when, in 1836, he held Waterloo Station. Some of his other New England properties included Kentucky Station, Beardy Plains, Dundee Station and Furracabad Station. Furracabad station was subsequently the site of the town of Glen Innes, which was named after him and laid out in 1851.

During the 1830s, Innes was one of Australia's richest colonists. However, he lost just about everything in the 1840s credit squeeze and became bankrupt in 1852. He was later an assistant gold commissioner and magistrate at Nundle and afterwards police magistrate at Newcastle, New South Wales.

Archibald Innes died in Newcastle on 29 August 1857. He was buried in Christ Church Cathedral Cemetery in Newcastle, but in the 1960s his headstone was transferred to Port Macquarie in the town's Pioneer Cemetery.

== See also ==
- Squatting
