= Lake Innes House Ruins =

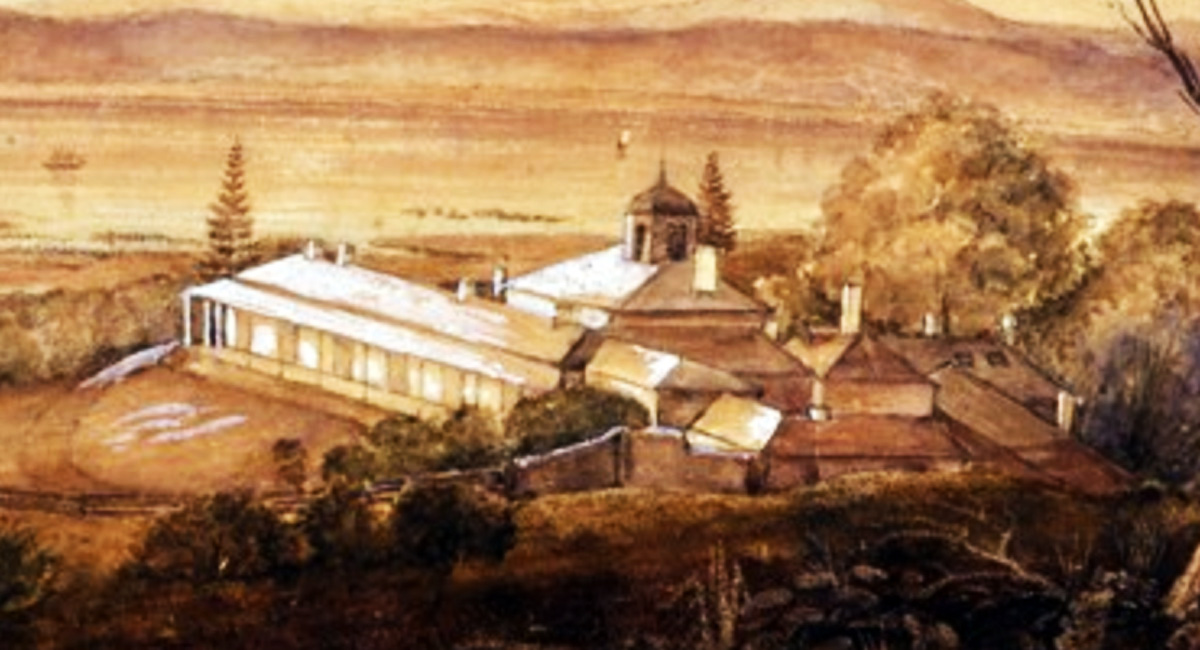
- Oil painting of Lake Innes house in 1839 when it was at the peak of its productivity

- Location within New South Wales
- 31.4964°S 152.8740°E
- Location: The Ruins Way, Port Macquarie, Port Macquarie-Hastings Council, New South Wales, Australia

History
- Built: 1831–1848

Site notes
- Owner: Office of Environment and Heritage

New South Wales Heritage Register
- Official name: Lake Innes House ruins and environs
- Type: state heritage (archaeological-terrestrial)
- Designated: 2 April 1999
- Reference no.: 997
- Type: Homestead Complex
- Category: Farming and Grazing
- Builders: Major Archibald Clunes Innes

Lake Innes House Ruins is a heritage-listed former rural holding and residence and now interpretative site and ruin at The Ruins Way, Port Macquarie, Port Macquarie-Hastings City Council, New South Wales, Australia. It was built from 1831 to 1848 by Major Archibald Clunes Innes. It is also known as Lake Innes House ruins and environs. The property is owned by Office of Environment and Heritage (New South Wales Government). It was added to the New South Wales State Heritage Register on 2 April 1999.

The ruins are 11 kilometres south of Port Macquarie, Australia. They are the relics of the house and stables once belonging to Major Archibold Clunes Innes, a retired officer of the British military. The ruins also include the remains of servants' cottages, an estate-workers' village, a farm that supplied the house with food, a brickmaking site and a boathouse by the lake. The site contains a rich history about the settlement of New South Wales, convict labour and the culture of the 1800s. It is managed by the NSW National Parks and Wildlife Service and is normally closed to the general public, except when guided tours are run by NPWS.

== History ==
=== Major Archibald Clunes Innes ===
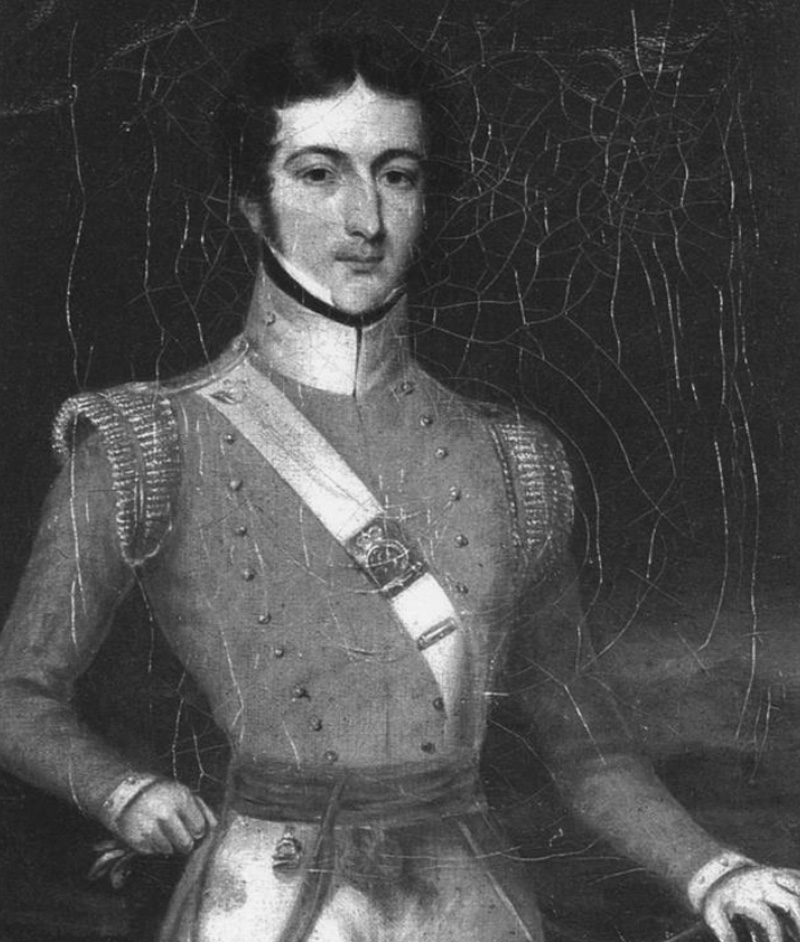
Major Archibald Innes circa 1825.

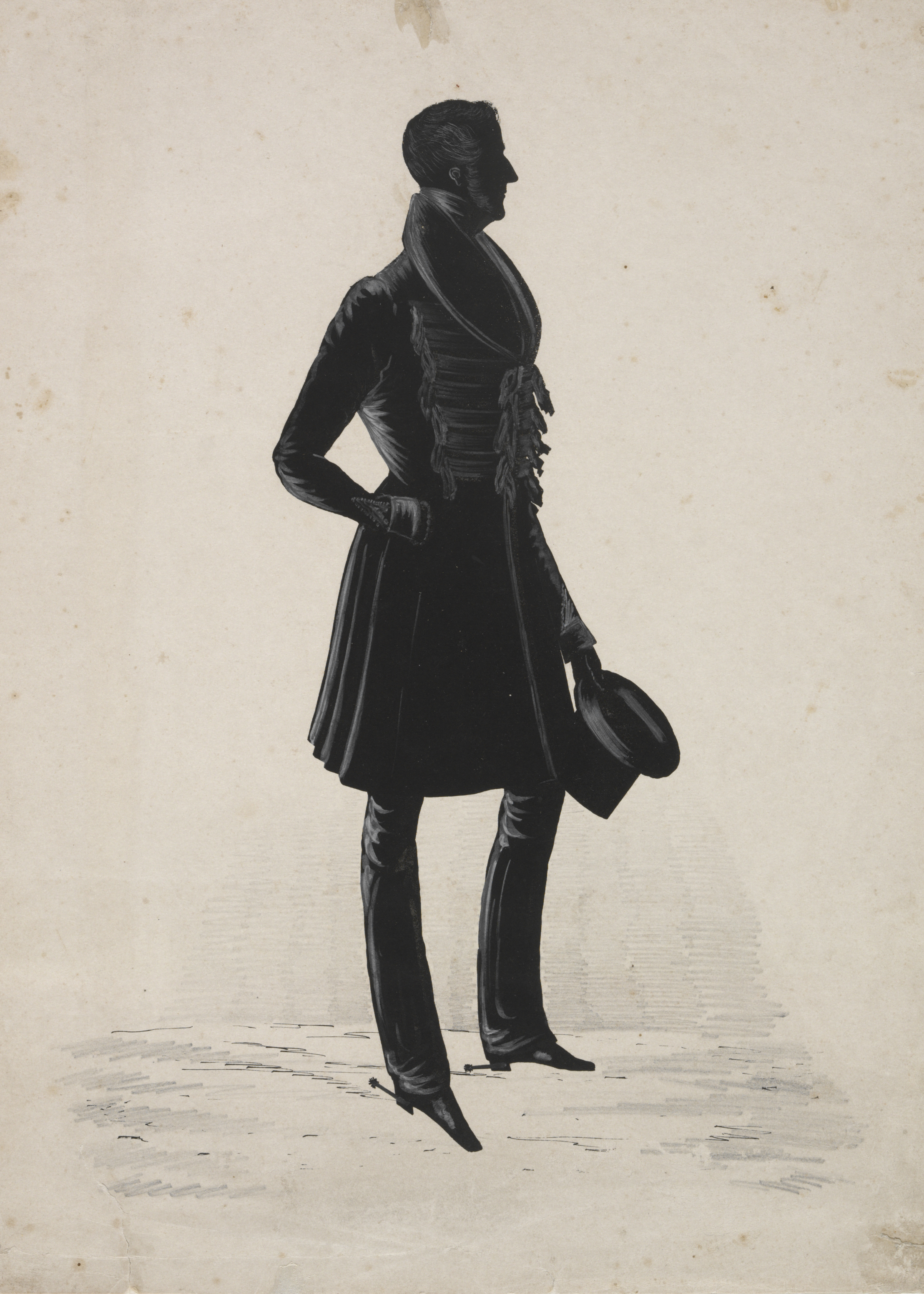
A silhouette of Major Innes by W.H. Fernyhough, 1836.

Archibald Clunes Innes was born in 1800 at Thrumster, Scotland, the sixth son of Major James Innes. He was commissioned an ensign in the 3rd Regiment (the Buffs) in 1813 at age 13 and served in the Peninsular War. He came to Sydney as captain of the guard in the convict ship Eliza in 1822. Between January 1824 and May 1825 he served in Tasmania where he was commended for recapturing escaped convicts. In December 1825 he was appointed aide-de-camp to the lieutenant-governor of New South Wales and became a magistrate in November 1826. After this he became commandant of the penal settlement at Port Macquarie. In 1828 he resigned his commission and was appointed superintendent of police and magistrate at Parramatta. He served here until his resignation in 1829. In the same year he married Margaret, daughter of the Colonial Secretary, Alexander McLeay.

In 1830 the couple came to Port Macquarie and Archibald was granted 2568 acres and was awarded contracts to supply the surrounding convict population with food. At this time Port Macquarie was a major convict settlement. Archibald gradually built his property over the next decade adding sections to his original modest house. By 1840 it consisted of 22 rooms and was known as one of the most luxurious houses in the area. Unlike most houses of this time it had an underground cistern, a bathroom, privies and a boiler for providing hot water.

During the 1830s and 1840s, Lake Innes House was an important social centre in which Major Innes provided generous hospitality to a succession of prominent house guests who in 1847 included even Sir Charles Fitzroy, at that time the Governor of NSW and his wife Mary. As his wealth grew he acquired more and more property. He bought sheep and cattle stations all over northern New South Wales, among them Yarrows on the Hastings, Brimbine and Innestown on the Manning, Waterloo, Innes Creek, Kentucky and Beardy Plains. He also bought Furracabad. The township on this station which is the present Glen Innes, was named after him. In his first few years at Lake Innes he produced the first sugar grown in the district and in 1844 he planted thirty acres of vines.

Major Innes was convinced that Port Macquarie would become a major port and settlement area. However, the entrance to the Hastings was too dangerous to encourage a large amount of shipping and the road that was built up to the Tablelands was found too hazardous. It was this miscalculation and the general economic depression of the 1840s which lead to his financial ruin. In addition the transportation of convicts to NSW ceased and the Port Macquarie Penal Settlement closed. This deprived him of his contracts to feed the convict population and meant that he no longer had the use of convict cheap labour to run his property. In 1853 he abandoned Lake Innes House and accepted employment as assistant gold commissioner and magistrate at Nundle and later police magistrate at Newcastle, where he died on 29 August 1857.

=== The Grandeur of Lake Innes House ===
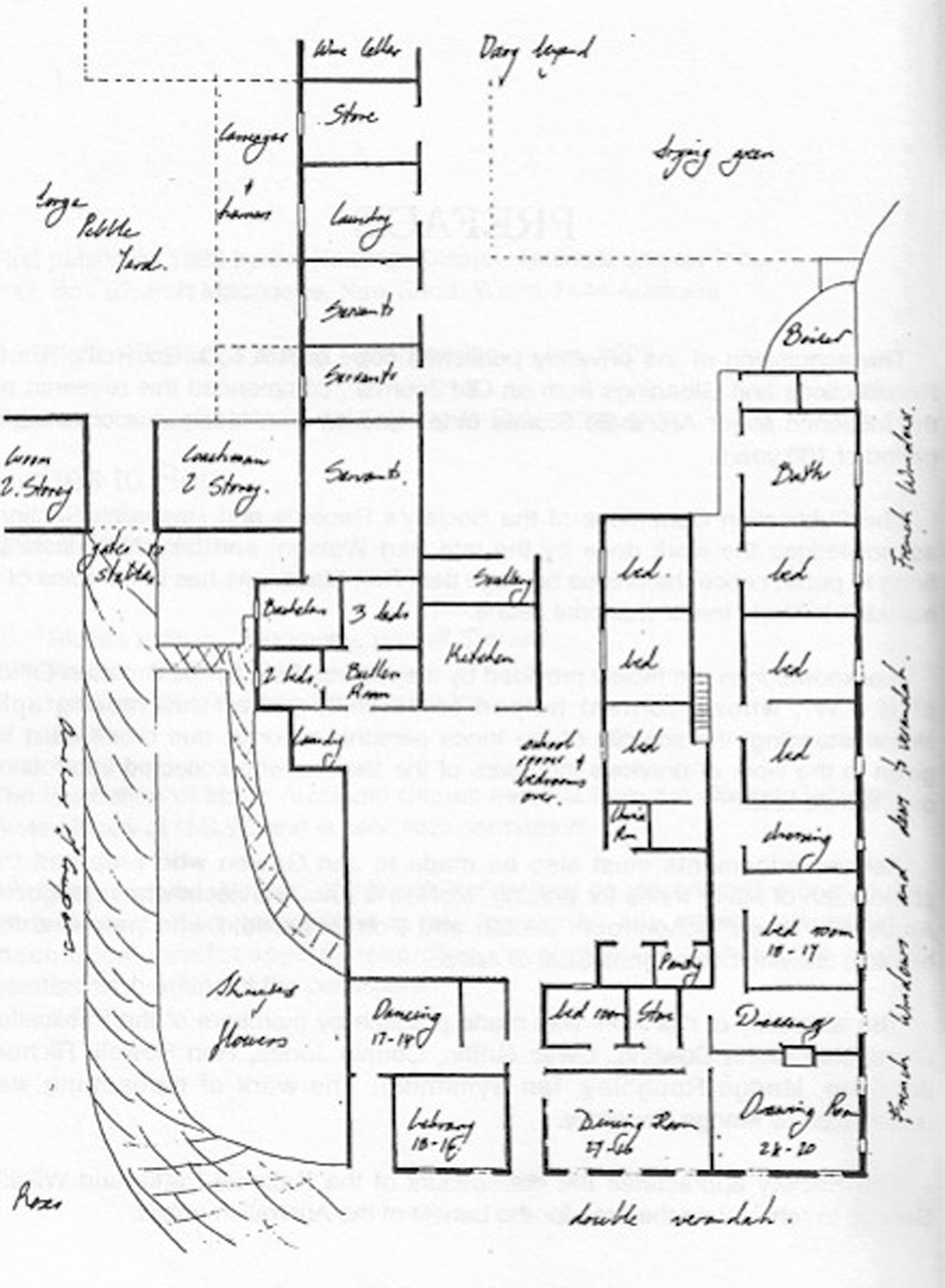
A sketch of the layout of Lake Innes House by Annabella Boswell circa 1845.

Descriptions of the house when it was a luxurious residence are contained in two diaries of young women who lived there. The most famous diary is by Annabella Boswell, Major Innes's niece, who was there between 1843 and 1848. The other diary is by Louisa Isabella Parker who received some of her education at the house. She lived there periodically between 1848 and 1853.

Annabella said that the house consisted of twenty-two rooms which were all well furnished. In addition, there was a separate building called the bachelor's hall which consisted of a sitting room and three bedrooms. She had drawn a plan of the house which is shown on the right and gave the following description of its overall layout.

“I have by me a rough plan of the house and grounds, stables and outbuildings, which gives some idea of their size and extent. There was a wide double verandah to the front of the house, which faced the Lake and the setting sun. A verandah extended along the whole of the south side. The drawing-room was a large square room at the corner 10ft by 24 ft, with two French Windows to the west and two to the south opening on to the verandah."

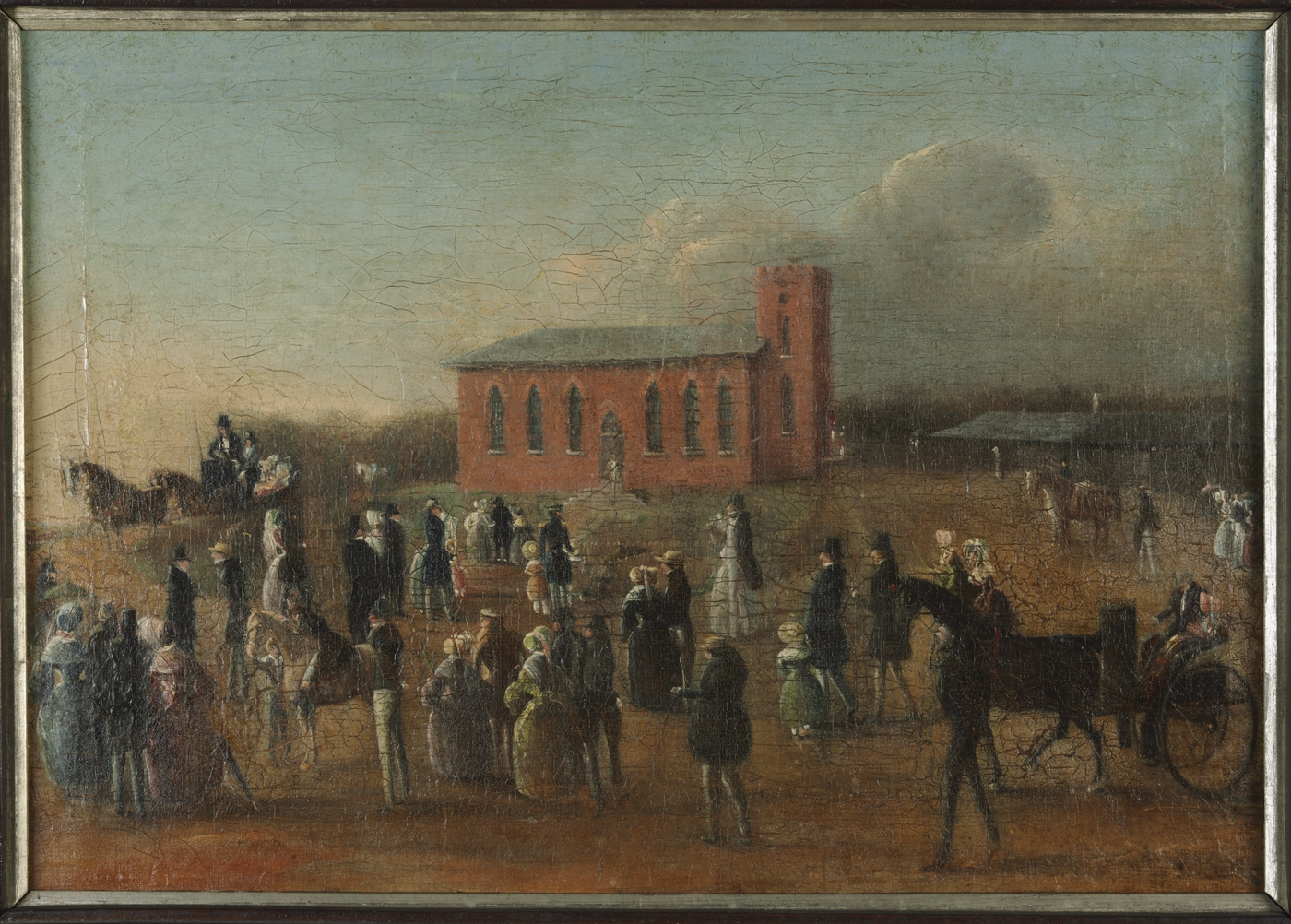
St Thomas' Church, Port Macquarie circa 1840.

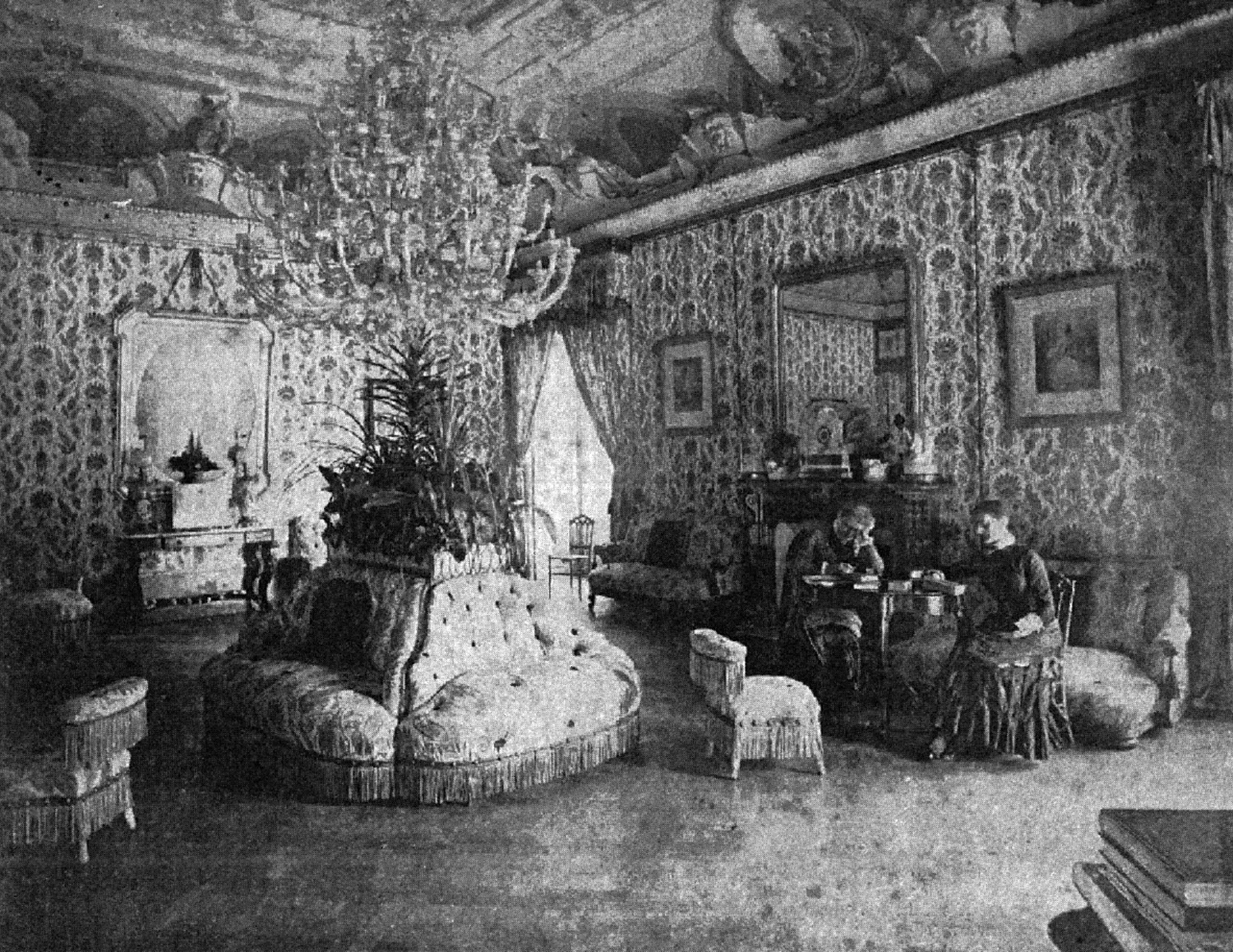
The drawing room as described by Louisa Parker.

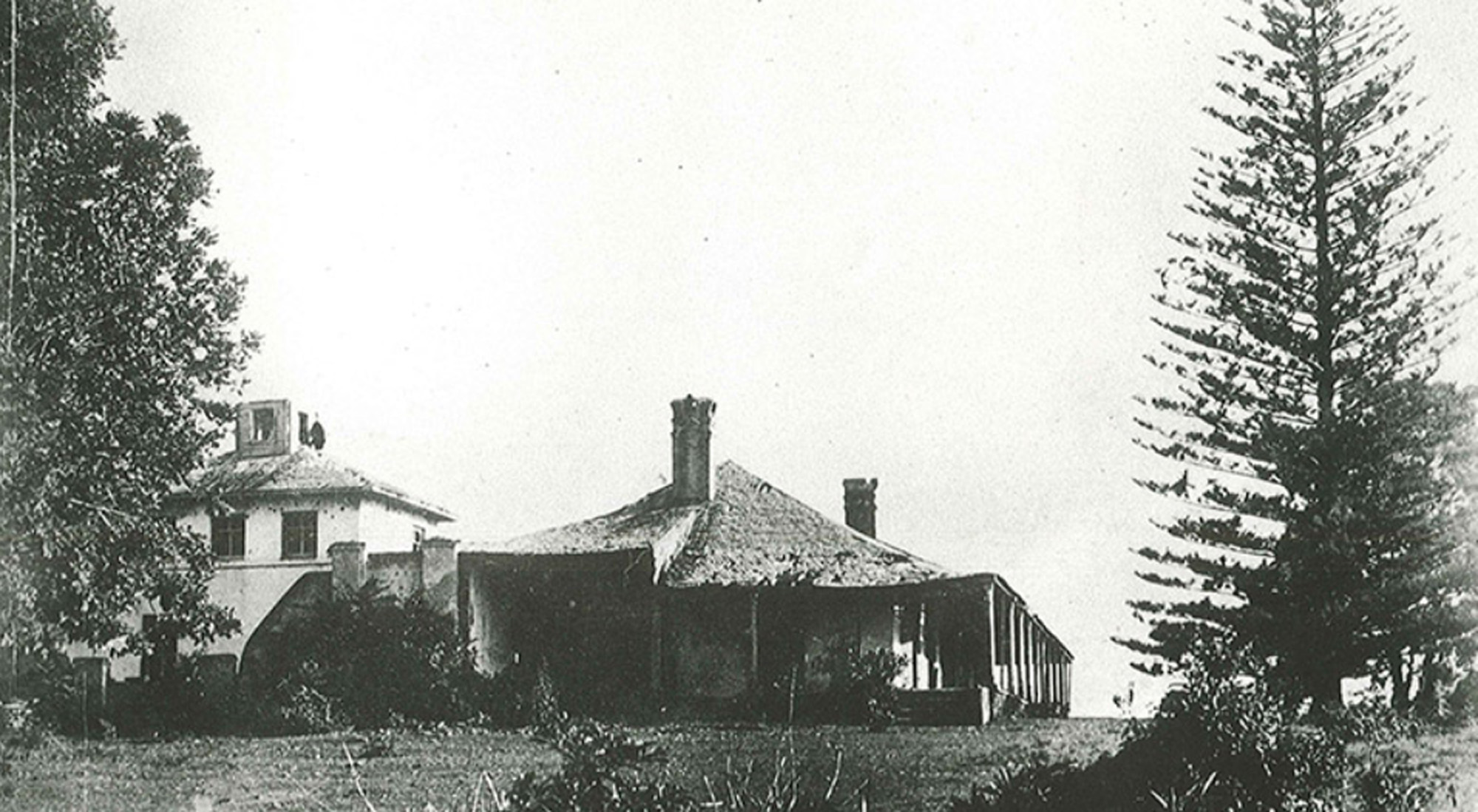
Lake Innes House before the fire.

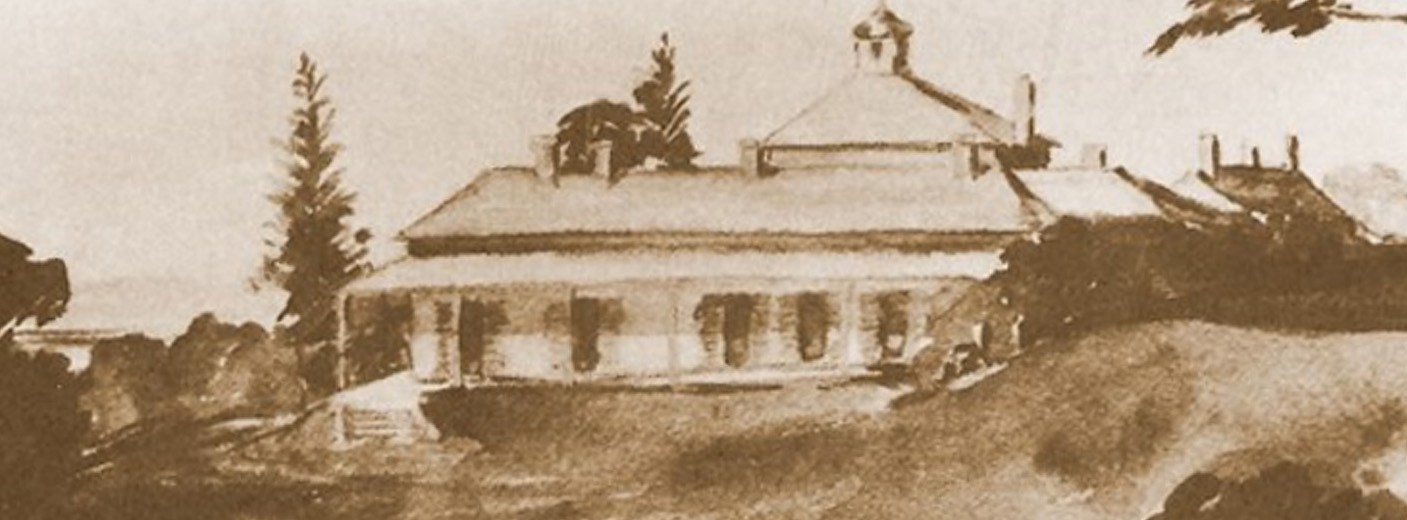
A watercolour of Lake Innes House, circa 1840.

A more detailed account of the house was given by Louisa Parker (née McIntyre) who recalled her first sight of the house when she was a child.

“I can vividly recall my first visit to Lake Innes. At the invitation of the Major and his wife, I accompanied Mrs. and the Misses Innes home in their carriage one Sunday after morning service in St. Thomas' Church (see painting of a gathering at St Thomas’ Church at about the time described by Louisa on the left). The carriage was drawn by four horses, and a coachman was in charge. Three or four gentlemen visitors rode behind the carriage. After an exceedingly pleasant drive, we passed through a white double gate, which gave entrance to the outer enclosure of the estate. About a mile from the house was another double white gate, and the drive then ran between well- kept hedges of lantana. On approaching the end of this avenue, I got my first glimpse, of the observatory towering among Norfolk Island pines and gigantic bamboos. The latter were waving and creaking above the gate at which we had just arrived.

The gentlemen then dismounted and handed us out of the carriage, and we passed along a broad, winding walk, bordered with ornamental shrubs and monthly roses, through which glimpses of the lake were to be seen. Beds of various shapes and sizes, well filled with flowers, and well-kept walks met the gaze, and a very pretty latticed summer-house attracted my notice. On reaching the house, we passed under an outer verandah, and went up a few steps, and were on the upper verandah, which was flagged with square blocks of stone. A gentleman rang the doorbell, and a liveried butler appeared, and we entered a fine, spacious hall, hung with pictures of a sporting character. To the left of the hall was the library, which was well filled with Volumes of all sizes. This room was the general resort. On the opposite side was the dining room, wherein was a table which, judging by its length, bespoke great hospitality. Suspended above it from the ceiling were three large cut-glass chandeliers, which had a very pretty effect. The walls were hung with pictures, depicting mostly historic scenes, and were enclosed in massive gilt frames. Very noticeable among the pictures was one of the Major in uniform, and he was depicted as a handsome man, and was accredited as being such in his youthful days. There were large pier glasses at each end of the room, and folds of rich-looking tapestry fell over the doors. I remember also seeing statuettes in bronze of Lord Nelson and the Duke of Wellington. Leaving the dining room, a passage was entered, and at the north end of this was a sitting room, and at the south end was the drawing-room, which was furnished in the rich and elaborate style of the period, the chairs and settees being covered. with gold-figured satin. It was a large room, and was decorated with rich tapestry, while large pictures in gilt frames hung from the walls. I cannot properly convey an idea of the beauty of that room, and it must suffice to say that it contained the best that the decorative art of the day could suggest. There was a long corridor to the east of the drawing-room, and on each side of it were sleeping apartments, the first to the left being Mrs. Innes' bedroom and dressing-room. Opposite was another fine bed and dressing- room, which were occupied by the Governor and his wife (Sir Charles and Lady Mary Fitzroy) during their visit. Then came the 'French room,' furnished after the fashion which the name implies. I remember that the curtains seemed to fall over the bed from the ceiling. Then followed other bedrooms, one of which was called the 'green room,' and was occupied by Colonel Grey or Captain Geary on their visits. At the end of the corridor was the bath-room, to which the water was laid on. A few yards from the bath-room was a flight of steps, leading to four other rooms, occupied at an earlier day by the governess and her young charges. These apartments included the school- room, governess's room, and a play- room.

Ascending a flight of steps from these rooms, the observatory was reached, from which a fine view of the lake and the surrounding country was to be had. From the east end of the passage a door led into the courtyard, which was bricked, and in which the kitchen (a two-storied building) stood at the back of the house. Above the kitchen were the butler's apartments. Numerous other buildings filled the ground at the back of the residence. In the second entrance from the court yard stood a building of Gothic design, with a large clock over the entrance which proclaimed the hours. To this apartment the bachelors resorted in order to smoke, and for this reason it earned the name of 'bachelors' hall.' The homestead formed quite a village, with the abodes of the employees, carriage houses, stables, etc. The orchard contained an abundance of fruit, and a vineyard supplied grapes from which wine for the table was made. Visitors were constantly coming and going.”

=== The Piper of Lake Innes House ===
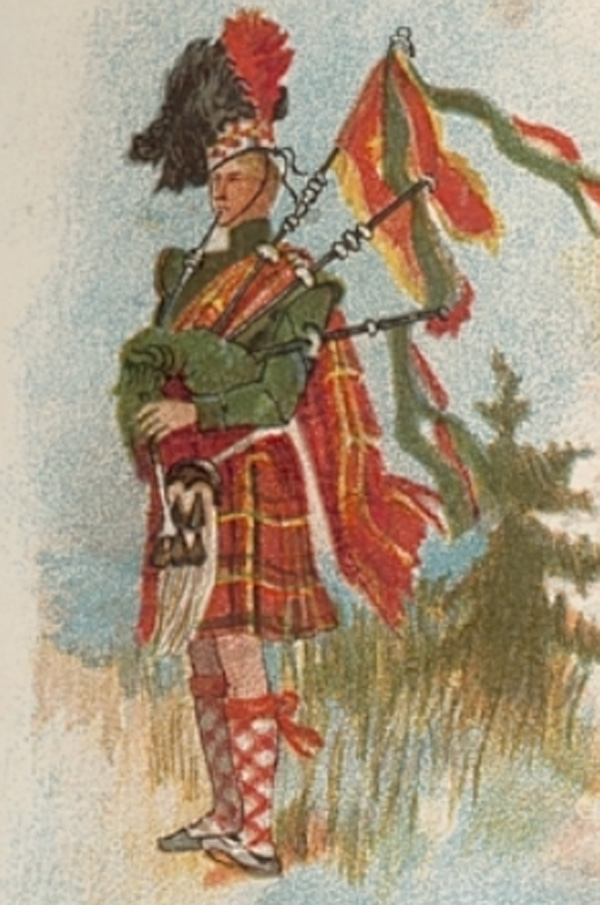
The full dress of a Scottish piper in 1840.

Annabella often referred to Bruce the piper who entertained the residents of the house. In one part of her diary she says that “Bruce played some pibrochs early for Mr Macleay’s benefit. I had no idea the bagpipes could sound so beautiful, though I liked them at all times the sound is so different in the open air when the piper is walking up and down."

The piper that she referred to was Peter Bruce who came as a free settler from Scotland in about 1840. He was part of a family whose members were renowned for their ability to play the bagpipes and are mentioned in the texts on the history of piping. His father was Alexander Bruce (1771-1840) of Glenelg, Scotland who had been taught by the famous MacCrimmon pipers and his uncle John Bruce (1775-1847) was the piper to Sir Walter Scott. It is also mentioned in the texts that two of Alexander's sons Peter and John, who also played the bagpipes very well, immigrated to Australia.

Although Peter played the pipes to entertain the guests he was also employed as a servant. Annabella mentions that he assists the butler serve at the table when required. However, his main occupation seems to be a farmer as she says that “in the fields grew oats and lucerne for hay also maize and Indian corn, Bruce having the charge or oversight of all."

At the time that Annabella wrote her diary in 1844 Peter Bruce was about to marry, Helen, her cousins maid. She mentions that the wedding of Bruce and Helen was held in the drawing-room The bride was Helen Sanderson, a Scottish girl, who immigrated to Australia in about 1838. She was on board the same ship that Annabella's maid Christina Ross had taken to come to Australia. The couple had several children while they lived at Lake Innes and in the early 1850s they moved to the goldfields at Bathurst and then to Beechworth. Eventually they came to Benalla in Victoria where Peter bought some land and became a farmer. He continued playing the bagpipes and his obituary mentions that he was known “as one of the best pipers in the colony.”

=== Convicts of Lake Innes ===
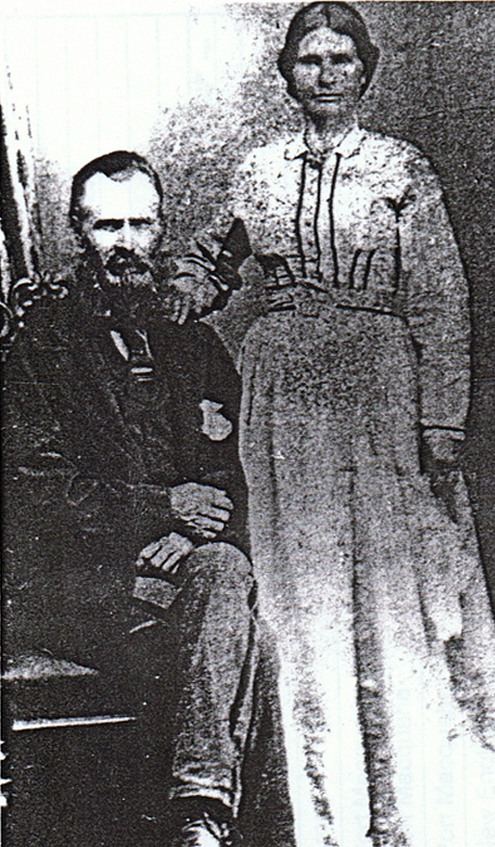
James and Martha Lahey. He was the butler in the early 1840s.

The vast majority of the servants at Lake Innes house were convicts. Even the two butlers that were mentioned in the girls’ diaries were both convicts. Annabella mentions that the name of the butler while she was there was Lahey. She also mentioned that his wife was the ladies maid to her aunt Margaret Innes.

The butler that she refers to was James Lahey, an Irishman who came to Australia in 1838 on the convict ship Patriot. He had been a soldier in the 41st Regiment in India until he was convicted of attempting to stab the adjutant. At the time of his conviction, he had been married to Martha Eaton for almost ten years and she followed him to New South Wales after his transportation. James was assigned to Major Innes and served as his butler for several years. After he obtained his pardon he continued to work for Innes for some time as a hotelier in Wauchope and then became a grazier.

The other butler mentioned in the diaries was George Wilson. Louisa Parker describes him as a tall Scotsman who was a former soldier who served at Waterloo. She said he wore a butler's uniform and waited at the table always being attentive and considerate. George Wilson was a convict who was transported to Australia for forgery in 1838 on the ship Lord Lyndoch. At the time of his conviction he was 43 years old. His occupation on the indent is stated to be soldier and indoor servant. He was sent to Port Macquarie Penal Settlement and obtained his Ticket Of Leave there in 1847. It may have been from this time that he went to work at Lake Innes.

When the Innes family went to Newcastle in 1853 Louisa Parker mentions that George went with them. It appears that he continued to work for the family until he became quite old. Thomas Wilson (not a relative) mentioned in 1867 in his diary that “old George” who was butler to Major Innes called at his house. He died at Port Macquarie in 1876.

Another servant mentioned several times by Annabella in her diary was Mrs Halloran who was the wife of a convict servant at Lake Innes. She said:

At the poultry yard were two cottages built on a piece of rising ground worked in the fields, the other for the Hallorans. There were pig-sties and sheds for the poultry, but I must own both pigs and fowls enjoyed a good deal of freedom. Halloran was a quiet elderly Irishman. I don’t quite know how his wife found her way to the colony but there she was and she was a decent, industrious creature, more than content to find herself so comfortably provided for, and quite happy among pigs and fowls, or as she herself called them, “The pigs and the rest of the poultry."

James Halloran was an Irish convict who had been convicted in Ballinrobe, County Mayo in 1839 of stealing timber. He was transported on the ship Middlesex and arrived in Sydney in 1840. It mentions on this record that there was a petition on behalf of “his destitute wife and family praying that she may be permitted to join her husband with her children."

The Hallorans had a son at Lake Innes in 1842. James obtained his pardon in 1846 and it seems that sometime after this the family moved to Sydney.

Not all of the convicts employed at Lake Innes were as agreeable and well behaved as these. Richard Young was a former soldier who had been convicted of desertion in County Mayo in 1834. He was transported to Sydney on the ship Forth in 1835. In 1837 he was assigned to Major Innes and two years later he absconded and became a notorious bushranger sometimes called “Gentleman Dick”.

=== Residents after the Innes family ===
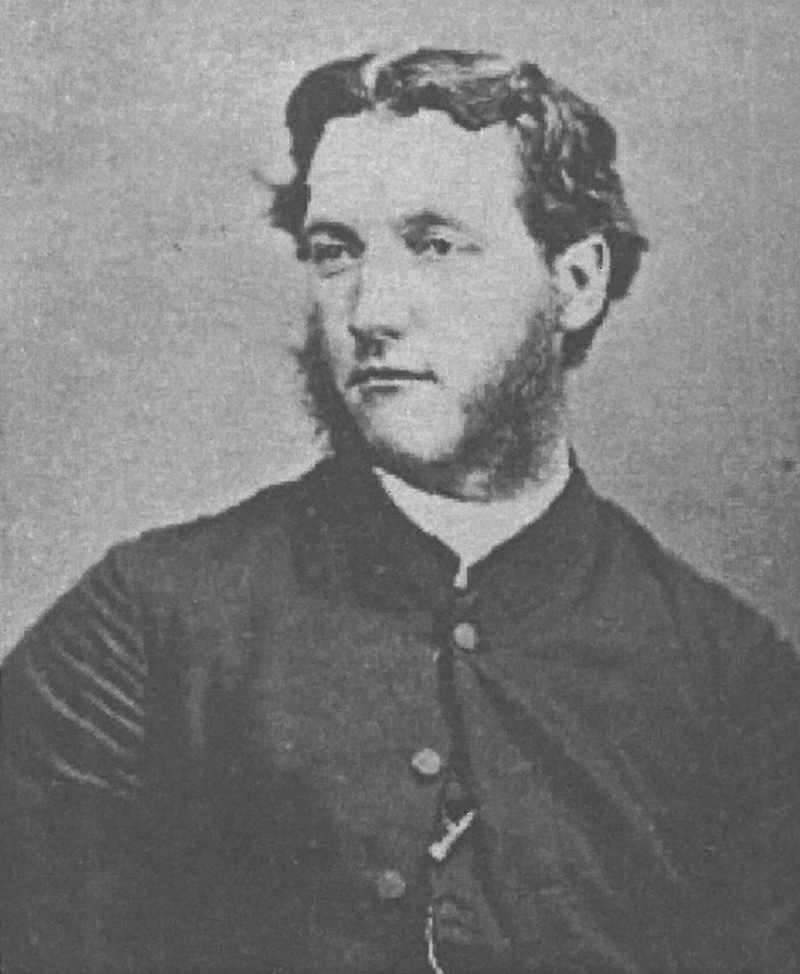
Gustavus Innes, who inherited the house after the death of Major Innes. He rented the house to several people.

After Archibald Innes died in 1857 his son Gustavus Innes inherited the property. He became a clergyman and so did not live at the house. His mother Margaret and sister Eliza lived there for two years. His mother died in 1858 and his sister married in 1859. The first tenant was Dr. Frederick McKellar who lived there from 1860 until his death in 1863. He was followed by Thomas George Wilson who rented the house from 1863 until about 1867. He did some farming there but it was not a success and he moved to a property called Clifton at Port Macquarie. After this, Dr. John Cash Nield rented the property. He had been appointed as surgeon to the Port Macquarie Asylum for the Infirm and Destitute. In 1868 it is mentioned that he had purchased machinery for the property at Lake Innes. and for some time he grew sugar which seemed to be quite successful.

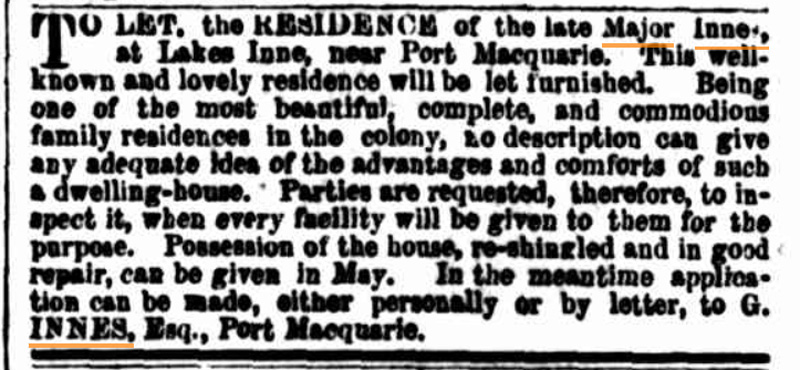
The to let advertisement inserted in the newspaper by Gustavus Innes. It appeared in 1860.

In 1871 Gustavus Innes sold the farm to Henry Zions. Henry was a tailor in Sydney and therefore did not live at the property. It appears that he rented the estate to the Rev. Charles Campbell Kemp who had moved to the area after the death of his wife. Kemp planted more grape vines on the estate. There is a detailed description of the estate at this time by Kemp's son Beilby Kemp who seems to have written a book called Friday Three Thirteen. A chapter in the book entitled “A Gem of the Southern Hemisphere” describes his stay at the lake in about 1872. At this time the house was still very habitable although somewhat overgrown by plants.

Rev Kemp died in 1874 and after this, the house fell into disrepair and gradually became derelict over the next 20 years. In 1896 there was a major fire in the house and it was burnt to the ground. The newspaper gave the following account.

News has been brought into Port Macquarie that late on Saturday the old residence on the Lake Innes Estate, built by Major Innes (convict labour) was burnt to the ground. The police are endeavouring to find out the cause of the fire, but have not yet succeeded. The building was erected soon after Port Macquarie was formed a convict settlement. It has not been inhabited for over twenty-five years, and was little better than a ruin at the time of the fire. The property was owned by Mr. Zions of Sydney.

By 1908 the property was owned by Captain Philip Charley who decided to make it a horse stud. This venture appears to have been relatively successful and when he died in 1937 his children inherited the Estate. One of the sons Noel Charley built a timber mill just outside the boundary but drew the timber from the hardwood trees on the property.

Today the property is under the protection of the National Parks and Wildlife Service and is only open to the public during guided tours run by the NPWS. Outside of those times, the property is closed to the general public.

== Description ==
Lake Innes House and associated sites are located on and adjacent to a south-pointing peninsula of land between Lake Innes and Innes Swamp. The main site is 11 kilometres south of the town of Port Macquarie, the house being well-sited on rising ground. The vegetation of the area consists of sclerophyll forest on the drier ground, with tea-tree and casuarina on the swamps and reed beds around the lake margins. In the heyday of Lake Innes House it appears that its immediate area consisted of gardens and cleared land, with an attractive view across the lake towards Mount Seaview in the distance.

Diaries of the Innes' niece Annabella Boswell (née Innes) between 1843-8 noted the existence of a vineyard and a "new flower garden" with hollyhocks, used for an 1843 birthday celebration dinner table decoration.

Very little above-ground evidence of Lake Innes House's once renowned garden appears on site today although layout, paths, etc., may well survive below the ground surface and its cover. Close to the house to one side are two enormous clumps of giant bamboo (Bambusa balcooa), a common feature of gardens of this ambition and scale at the time, certainly amongst notables such as the Macarthur family, Governors etc.

House

The ruins of the house and stables constitute the major physical evidence of the Innes property, although a number of other related sites are known to exist or are suspected to exist in the area. These include the remains and sites of servants' cottages, an estate-workers' village, a farm that supplied the house with food, a brickmaking site, a corduroy road towards the beach, another corduroy road to the lake, a boathouse by the lake and probably other sites yet to be located.

The two main wings of the house form an L-shaped structure, the living rooms facing west with views over the lake and the bedroom wing facing south to avoid the heat of the sun. Adjacent to the courtyard behind were the kitchen, accommodation for male visitors (the bachelors hall), servants quarters, laundry store, wine cellar, dairy and the underground cistern that provided the household water supply. At the eastern end of the bedroom wing were a bathroom, privies and a boiler for providing hot water in the bathroom. The surviving standing remains comprise but a small part of what was once a 22-room mansion and its associated buildings.

Outbuildings

Adjoining the house to the north east and connected to it by a common wall with the servants' quarters and associated facilities is the stables complex. In addition to stabling for a number of horses and accommodation for carriages and storage for harness, this complex contained living spaces for stable workers. The structure is in a better state of preservation than the house with many of the walls still standing to the roof level.

Boswell's diaries include note of a separate schoolroom in which the Innes children were educated.

Both house and stables are made of handmade sandstock bricks and similar brick was also used at most of the related sites. Brick sizes are fairly uniform but probably varied a little depending on the mud in use and the irregular finish. Most probably the bricks were manufactures on the property from clay which came from a source not far from the house, on the eastern side of the road from Port Macquarie. (The Archaeology of Lake Innes House, National Parks and Wildlife Service)

The construction of the house and stables would have used large quantities of various types of wood: for roof framing, shingles, flooring, skirting boards, fireplace-surrounds, window and door frames, the window and doors themselves, verandas, stairs and so on, but very little has survived on the site.

The physical condition of the ruins was reported as poor as at 16 April 1998, while the archaeological potential was reported as high.

While the structural integrity of Lake Innes Estate and associated sites is medium to low the archeological integrity of the entire site is high. Due to the limited development of the Innes peninsula following the death of Archibald Innes, there is still clear visible evidence of the main house and stables and other associated sites which supported the function of the main household. Evidence of brick manufacture, food production and servants' accommodation are all evident on the site. Apart from some illegal digging by fossickers and past researchers on the site, the archeological resource is substantially intact in many areas as demonstrated by the first excavations in 1999.

== Heritage listing ==
Lake Innes House ruins and environs is a major historical monument to the pre-1850 period of settlement of Australia. Its key role in the early development of a region in NSW is made poignant by the evocative ruined remains of a surprisingly large establishment and the existence of detailed contemporary records (Boswell) of day-to-day activities during its decline. It contains an extensive archaeological resource for the study of Australian architecture, gardening, farming history and early 19th-century domestic arrangements. In the above respects it is a rare resource because of subsequent inactivity and the existence of contemporary records (journals, drawing and plan). The house ruins are one of a small number of large colonial period domestic ruins in NSW. In its growth and planning it testifies to the confidence and aspirations of those who became quickly rich on Government resources during the 1830s and in its swift decline and ruin it symbolises the sudden demise of this class as a result of the 1840s economic recession (Clive Lucas & Partners, 1987)

Lake Innes Estate is of state cultural significance for its natural and cultural values. The place is of significance for its remnant wetland areas, koala population and other threatened animal species.

The place also contains rare cultural evidence relating to the layout and functioning of a large seaside estate including largely archaeologically intact outbuildings, industrial areas (brick-making sites and roads), convict, servant guest and resident accommodation.

The combination of written and physical evidence related to Aboriginal and non-Aboriginal occupation of the site make the Lake Innes Estate an outstanding research resource.

Historically the association of the place with prominent colonials such as Innes, the Macleays and Boswell is an important element of the significance of the place.

Lake Innes Estate is significant to the local and regional community as demonstrated through community action beginning in the 1940s and 1950s and continuing through to the public participation and interest in the ongoing conservation programmes at the site.

Lake Innes Estate is also of significance for its interpretive and educational potential. The Estate is capable of demonstrating a number of local and state historic themes. The major themes relate to Aboriginal occupation, history and land tenure; the local environment and the impact of human settlement; convictism and the rise of the middle classes in nineteenth century Australia; expansion and exploration at the edge of European settlement through commerce, pastoralism and agriculture; and the development of townships such as Port Macquarie in the north coast region of NSW.

Lake Innes House ruins and environs was listed on the New South Wales State Heritage Register on 2 April 1999 having satisfied the following criteria.

The place is important in demonstrating the course, or pattern, of cultural or natural history in New South Wales.

It is directly associated with Major Archibald Innes who was a prominent entrepreneur in NSW during the 1830s and 1840s and the owner of a very large pastorally based empire. He exemplified a class of colonial capitalists and speculators dominant in NSW in the period 1820–1845. The place contains physical evidence of the focus for the history of the land settlement of the New England region.

The place has a strong or special association with a person, or group of persons, of importance of cultural or natural history of New South Wales's history.

Major Archibald Innes (1800-1857) was a key figure in the development of Port Macquarie and the New England area. He was one of the largest and wealthiest landholders in NSW comparable to John Jamieson, Henry Dangar, Richard Jones and William Lawson. Glen Innes in northern NSW was named after him.

His push to make Port Macquarie the coastal link for the New England region is a key factor in understanding the settlement of this region.

Margaret Innes, one of the daughters of Alexander Macleay, is likely to have had a strong influence on the development and layout of the garden house at the Lake Innes estate reflecting her personal and family interests in scientific pursuits.

The establishment of the Lake Innes Estate represents the rise of the landed upper and middle classes in NSW towards the end of the period of convict transportation.

The basis of Innes' wealth and the construction of his was dependent upon convict labour.

Innes' convict labour supplied goods for the Port Macquarie penal settlement.

The end of transportation played a major role in the decline of Lake Innes House and Major Innes' financial enterprises.

In the context of land settlement, the Lake Innes Estate is historically rare in a regional and state context as an example of an 1840s estate with the full range of estate functions still visible in the landscape.

The lake Innes Estate is representative of the impact of the end of convict transportation on individuals as well as the colony as a whole.

The place is important in demonstrating aesthetic characteristics and/or a high degree of creative or technical achievement in New South Wales.

The stables are an unusually substantial and architectural courtyard stable complex and although ruined are of a rare scale and unique formal design for such colonial buildings in Australia outside Tasmania. The place is one of only a few seaside estates built in NSW in the colonial period and demonstrates contemporary attitudes to landscape design and estate planning shown in the siting of buildings, location of roads and the construction of a lookout tower.

The place has strong or special association with a particular community or cultural group in New South Wales for social, cultural or spiritual reasons.

The place has been a historical site in the minds of people of the Port Macquarie area and others interested in Australian history for the past 100 years. The immediacy of its historical, evocative and romantic appeal has for many years added to its reputation as an historic site.

The Birpai Local Aboriginal Land council have a strong interest in the management of the Lake Innes Peninsula in particular in the location and management of Aboriginal sites. Sights along lighthouse beach have been assessed as having very high significance to the local Aboriginal people.

Regional visitation to the site as interesting ruins commenced as early as 1900 and visitation has occurred ever since

The popularity of NPWS guided tours indicate that there is a strong level of local interest in the site.

The Port Macquarie Historical Society has maintained a strong interest in the site since at least the 1950s and holds a number of key items and documents associated with the site including Boswell's diary and a dress belonging to her. The Society has also demonstrated its interests in the site through publications.

Press coverage of the NPWS conservation works and UNE archaeological works over the last decade has demonstrated, and helped to maintain, public interest in the site.

Professor Graham Connah's Lake Innes investigations have employed many students and ex-student volunteers since 1993. The site has formed an important part of their training and the archaeology programme has generated community interest and support. Connah has raised substantial funding for the current research programme indicating a broad interest in his research into the site.

Hastings City Council see Major Innes as a potential focus for cultural tourism in Port Macquarie. Major Innes, and sites associated with him, are considered to be of the highest importance in the local community. Motels, roads and other features in the municipality are named after him.

The place has potential to yield information that will contribute to an understanding of the cultural or natural history of New South Wales.

The place is a unique resource for the study of Australian architecture, gardening, farming history and early 19th century domestic arrangements. The place contains roads which are good examples of convict built civil engineering works to survive unaltered in NSW. The house has the rare remains of an early attached bathroom and boiler room which had hot and cold water services and possibly a sewage system.

The place possesses uncommon, rare or endangered aspects of the cultural or natural history of New South Wales.

The house ruins are one of a small number of large colonial period domestic ruins in NSW. It is a rare resource because of the existence of contemporary records (journals, drawing and plan). The Lake Innes Peninsula has natural landscape values of state significance. These include the existence of a viable and healthy koala population and koala habitat as well as a number of other animal species listed under the threatened Species Act.

Much of the wetland area is protected under State Environmental Planning Policy 14 (SEPP 14:P Wetlands) and is one of the few major coastal wetlands in NSW not affected by flood mitigation drainage schemes.

The natural and cultural scientific and research potential of the Lake Innes Estate is rare in a state context.

The extent and integrity of the archaeological remains, including standing archeological remains are rare and provide a unique research opportunity in NSW.
