= Port Macquarie Government House Site =

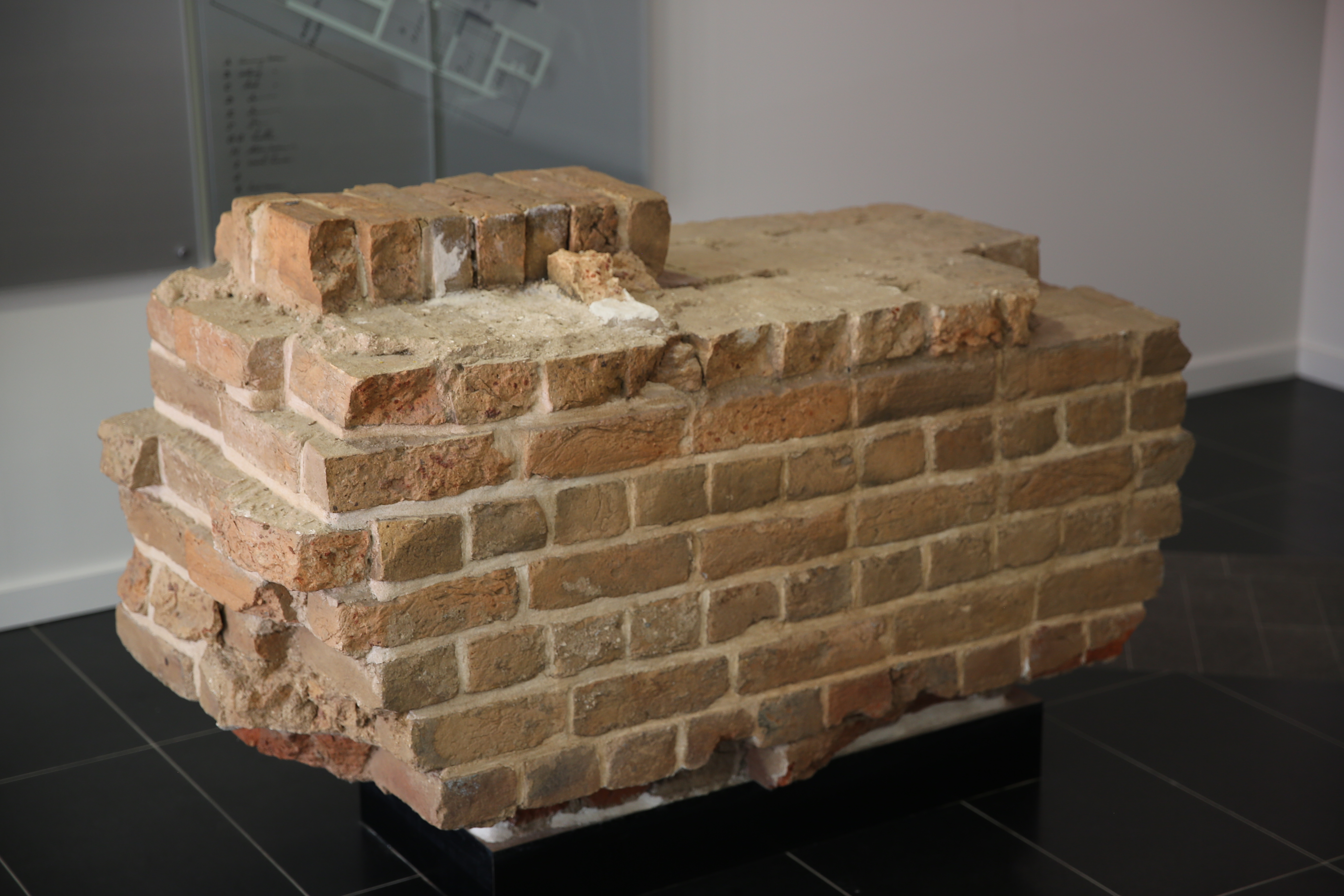
- Some surviving brickwork, 2018

- Location within New South Wales Location within Australia
- 31.4292°S 152.9128°E
- Location: 2 Clarence Street, Port Macquarie, Port Macquarie-Hastings Council, New South Wales, Australia

History
- Built: 1821–1826

Site notes
- Architect: Government of NSW
- Owner: Port Macquarie-Hastings Council

New South Wales Heritage Register
- Official name: Port Macquarie Government House Site; Government House Site at Port Macquarie; Old Government House Port Macquarie
- Type: state heritage (archaeological-terrestrial)
- Designated: 3 August 2001
- Reference no.: 1517
- Type: Government House
- Category: Government and Administration
- Builders: Government Convicts

Port Macquarie Government House Site is a heritage-listed archaeological site at 2 Clarence Street, Port Macquarie, Port Macquarie-Hastings Council, New South Wales, Australia. It was built from 1824 to 1826 by convict labour. The property is owned by Port Macquarie-Hastings Council. It was added to the New South Wales State Heritage Register on 3 August 2001.

== History ==
The first Government House in Port Macquarie was an 1821 one-storey weatherboard building built for the commandant, Francis Allman, and his family. In c. 1825-26, Government House was shifted to an existing brick building (built c. 1824) next to the military barracks, which was heavily extended and adapted for its new role. It was used by the Commandant of Port Macquarie until the 1832 when the post ceased to exist following the abolition of the penal settlement. It then housed the Police Magistrate until the office was discontinued on 31 December 1847, at which time it passed to the Clerk of Petty Sessions. It was again occupied by the Police Magistrate when that position was recreated, and again passed to the Clerk of Petty Sessions when it was abolished for a second time in 1869. The building was already reported to be in need of repairs by the mid-1830s, and by the 1850s was in a state of disrepair. Some restoration was carried out in 1861, but it continued to be described as in poor repair thereafter. The last occupant, Clerk of Petty Sessions Robert Perrott, vacated the property in November 1879. It was described as empty and falling apart in 1884, and was demolished in 1886.

The remains of the brick Government House were rediscovered in 2001 during excavations for an apartment building, at which time they were to be destroyed for the construction of a motel car park. An interim heritage order was put in place in March 2001, and the remains were formally listed on the State Heritage Register in August that year.

== Description ==
The site is now an archaeological site containing the remains of the Port Macquarie Government House.

It includes the brick and sandstone footings of the house, including courtyard and wings, brick barrel drains, square brick drains, brick paving, the cellar and cellar steps, some post holes (verandah, and outbuildings), and animal bones, pottery shards, glass fragments, buttons, coins.

It was reported at the time of the interim heritage listing that "90% of the original footprint" had survived.

The remains were reported to be in excellent condition as at 19 July 2001.

== Heritage listing ==
The archaeological remains of Government House, Port Macquarie are a rare example of the official residence of the Commandant of a place of secondary punishment in Eastern Australia and of a local magistrate in a regional centre in 19th century New South Wales. The house was both the symbol of authority and centre of administration at Port Macquarie in its evolution from penal settlement, to convict depot and free settlement, to self-governing local community. The officials who occupied the house played an important role in the administration of the convict system in New South Wales and in the development of law and order on the boundaries of settlement in a period of major expansion. In its first phase of occupation, Port Macquarie was an important component of the convict system as regularised after 1815 and one of a small number of places of secondary punishment, the locations of which were specifically chosen for their remoteness, inaccessibility and exploitable natural resources. In its second convict phase Port Macquarie was unique as a depot reserved for "specials", invalids, the insane and infirm. The town made an effective transition from convict settlement to local urban centre, playing an important role in the development of its region. Archaeological remains, buildings and historical documents are complementary resources for the compilation of an authentic account of the penal system in New South Wales and Australia and the archaeological remains of Government House, Port Macquarie are an integral component of this research process.

The significance of Port Macquarie and of its Government House should not be considered solely in relation to the present State of New South Wales. In historical terms, the Colony of New South Wales at the time the penal settlement at Port Macquarie was established included parts of the State of Queensland and Norfolk Island. The settlement must also be considered in the context of the operation of the convict system throughout the Australian colonies and of the policies and objectives of successive British governments in relation to law, order and the punishment of offenders.

Port Macquarie Government House Site was listed on the New South Wales State Heritage Register on 3 August 2001 having satisfied the following criteria.

The place is important in demonstrating the course, or pattern, of cultural or natural history in New South Wales.

As one of the few remaining sites with strong associations with the convict system, Port Macquarie is important in the history of the early European settlement of Australia.

Port Macquarie, established in 1821, was the first designated place of secondary punishment in the Colony of New South Wales. Designed to deal with repeat offenders who could not be accommodated within the existing convict structure, the aim of such settlements was to subject prisoners to isolation, severe discipline and hard work.

The establishment of places of secondary punishment represented a significant development in the creation of a comprehensive penal system by the British government.

The location of the settlement and the disposition of its original buildings were designed by Governor and Mrs Macquarie. Governor Macquarie was directly involved in the program of building works drawn up for the settlement.

Port Macquarie has a close association with Governor Macquarie who was instrumental in the establishment of the place and with his wife Elizabeth, who together determined the choice of siting and design of the penal settlement.

As a domestic residence, Government House has a close association with successive Commandants of the penal settlement and their families including Capt Francis Allman, Capt John Rolland and Capt Archibald Innes and with the Resident Police Magistrates of the free settlement and their families.

As the centre of government penal administration and of the local magistracy, Government House has close associations with the population of Port Macquarie both bond and free and with many significant local residents.

The place is important in demonstrating aesthetic characteristics and/or a high degree of creative or technical achievement in New South Wales.

The penal settlement at Port Macquarie was designed on picturesque principles under the guidance and influence of Governor Macquarie and his wife Elizabeth. It was the only penal settlement to be so designed. Views to and from the water were key elements of the plan.

The siting of Government House and of the surviving St Thomas' Church represent, in built form, the close connection perceived in the 19th century between government and the church, and between penal policy and the reform of the offender.

Many of the buildings and much of the infrastructure built by convict labour continued in use throughout the 19th century making a substantial contribution to the development of later communities.)

The place has strong or special association with a particular community or cultural group in New South Wales for social, cultural or spiritual reasons.

Considerable interest is now being expressed by Australians in the convict system as a part of their history. Much research is being undertaken into the part that the convict heritage has had in shaping Australian identity and the development of its liberal and democratic institutions.

Convict labour is now understood as an integral part of the economic history of Australia as an immigrant society.

The settlement at Port Macquarie was one of a range of convict establishments, the physical remains and documentary records of which are complementary parts of the history of the convict system throughout Australia.

The place has potential to yield information that will contribute to an understanding of the cultural or natural history of New South Wales.

Government House was an integral part of a planned settlement. The site has the potential to contribute to an understanding of the settlement as a whole and to comparative analyses of its place in relation to other establishments within the convict system.

The quality and extent of the archaeological remains of Government House demonstrate a way of life associated with the penal settlement of Port Macquarie and the later development of civilian settlement.

The archaeological remains of Government House, together with its associated artifacts have the potential to contribute to an understanding of the working of the settlement at Port Macquarie and the role of the occupants of the house in its administration and general life.

Government House is a significant element in the range of buildings constructed for a large-scale penal settlement and has the ability to contribute to an understanding of the totality of the convict system in Australia.

As the home of successive Resident Police Magistrates the site has the potential to contribute to an understanding of the development of free settlement at Port Macquarie.

Existing structures, archaeological remains and historical documents are complementary sources for the compilation of an authentic account of the penal system in New South Wales and Australia. Archaeological remains are an integral component of this research process.

The place possesses uncommon, rare or endangered aspects of the cultural or natural history of New South Wales.

Port Macquarie was the only designated place of secondary punishment to be established during the period of the Assignment System in the present State of New South Wales and the first such place to be established in Australia at this period.

The archaeological remains of Government House are the only known surviving example in New South Wales of a "government house" in a distant settlement, built for the use of government officials.

The archaeological remains of Government House, Port Macquarie are older than the surviving building fabric at Port Arthur and the Second Settlement at Norfolk Island, also places of secondary punishment.

The archaeological evidence at Port Macquarie is not duplicated in the existing range of heritage convict sites at Sydney, Parramatta and Newcastle.

The penal settlement of Port Macquarie was designed on picturesque principles, the only penal settlement to be so designed.

Government House is one of the two main elements of the picturesque composition of the penal settlement, the other being the existing church of St Thomas. The physical reality of the surviving archaeological remains of Government House allows this relationship to be rediscovered, experienced and interpreted.
