= Overseers' Cottages Remains, Port Macquarie =

Overseers' Cottages Remains
- Location within New South Wales Location within Australia
- 31.4294°S 152.9090°E
- Location: 30-44 Clarence Street, Port Macquarie, Port Macquarie-Hastings Council, New South Wales, Australia

History
- Built: 1823–1830

Site notes
- Architect(s): Engineer and Inspector of Public Works and the Superintendent of Convicts.
- Owner: Port Macquarie-Hastings Council

New South Wales Heritage Register
- Official name: Archaeological Remains of Overseers' Cottages; Glasshouse Arts and Entertainment Centre; Town Hall; School of Arts;
- Type: state heritage (archaeological-terrestrial)
- Designated: 13 August 2010
- Reference no.: 1813
- Type: Other - Government & Administration
- Category: Government and Administration
- Builders: The Overseers' Cottages were built by convict labour.

Overseers' Cottages Remains is a heritage-listed archaeological site, now incorporated into the Glasshouse entertainment centre, at 30-44 Clarence Street, Port Macquarie, Port Macquarie-Hastings Council, New South Wales, Australia. It is the remains of cottages for convict overseers', built from 1823 to 1830 by convict labour. The property is owned by Port Macquarie-Hastings Council. It was added to the New South Wales State Heritage Register on 13 August 2010.

== History ==
Part of the site underwent archaeological excavation in May and June 2006, in advance of the Glasshouse development. Historical research had indicated the presence of a number of previous structures associated with the 1821-32 penal settlement. The excavation was confined to the area of the basement for the new theatre.

The excavation concentrated on the Quarters of the Deputy Superintendent of Convicts and two buildings occupied by the Free Overseers. The other two cottages on the original Henrietta, later Elizabeth Street, frontage were to the west of the excavation area or off site to the west. Only a small portion of the allotment to Cottage 1 was within the excavation area.

There is no precise date for the construction of the cottages. They are first shown on a map dated to 1824. Additional historical research indicated that the Deputy Superintendent of Convicts and the Free Overseers were appointed in 1823, so it is highly likely that the cottages were built to receive their new occupants in that year.

Penal settlement

Port Macquarie was one of a number of penal settlements for the secondary punishment of offenders. Convicted criminals were sent to New South Wales from 1788 to the end of transportation in 1840. If they were convicted of additional crimes in New South Wales, they were sent to places of secondary punishment.

On the New South Wales coast, Newcastle was the first penal settlement for secondary punishment from 1804 to 1824, followed by Port Macquarie from 1821 to 1832 and Moreton Bay from 1829 to 1838. The purpose of these penal settlements was to remove the convict to a place of isolation from the rest of the free population, to keep them at hard labour, as a deterrent to others. Even with the end of transportation in 1840, Cockatoo Island in Sydney was still planned as a place of secondary punishment in 1839, closing in 1869.

Port Macquarie was like most of the other places of secondary punishment, in fact also similar to some of the first penal settlements in New South Wales. They all required a similar suite of buildings and all were divided into Military Department, Civil Administration and Convict Accommodation. The Deputy Superintendent of Convicts and the Free Overseers were part of the Civil Administration and came under the authority of the Superintendent of Convicts. They were responsible for the daily and weekly musters and supervision of the labour of the convicts.

Archaeological excavation

The archaeological excavations of the Glasshouse have made an important contribution to our knowledge of the Penal Settlement at Port Macquarie. While the historical maps showed the cottages on their allotments, divided from kitchen gardens at the rear, they did not reveal the complexity of the sequence of buildings, the extensions and outbuildings to the cottages, showing a period of high activity in the 1820s. The accommodation or floor space of these buildings was doubled or more than doubled by this archaeological evidence. The sequence of changes was particularly well preserved between Cottages 2 and 3, where a roadway to the kitchen gardens was replaced by a fenceline, encroached on by at least two phases of extensions and outbuildings to Cottages 2 and 3 and finally became a metalled yard area in the 1830s.

The allotments of the Deputy Superintendent of Convicts and Free Overseers measured 57 3/8 perches or 1,451 square metres, being 70 feet wide and approximately 223 feet deep (21.3 by 68 metres). The frontage to Henrietta, later Elizabeth Street was occupied by the houses, the rear by kitchen gardens. The allotments and cottages were numbered 1-5 from east to west. Cottage 2 was of slab construction and Cottage 3 was built using brick. Both buildings measured 25 by 30 feet (7.62 by 9.14 metres) and comprised a central hallway, flanked by two front and two rear rooms. On Allotments 1, 2 and 3, there is archaeological evidence for both extensions and outbuildings, which doubled, or more than doubled the available floor space. On the basis of room size and also living space, the Deputy Superintendent of Convicts and the Free Overseers were housed to a high standard in buildings constructed by convict labour under the supervision of the military engineer or inspector of public works. In fact they enjoyed a standard of accommodation above that occupied by others in a similar social or economic position. The artifact assemblage reveals that the Free Overseers enjoyed a standard of living consistent with others, who could not afford to purchase property, but lived in rented accommodation.

Furthermore, the excavations revealed the presence of a previously unsuspected brick barrel drain, running along the rear of the houses towards the east and to the alignment of Allman Street (now approximately Hay Street). The brick barrel drain was obviously part of a network of drains, including another drain previously located on the Henrietta, later Elizabeth Street frontage. This excavation has provided the first opportunity to see how the components of a brick barrel drain functioned and how it related to the buildings it served.

In addition the excavation has revealed other features that were unexpected, including two shallow timber-lined wells, taking advantage of the raised water table in this low-lying area. The re-used timbers appear to have come from earlier buildings, probably dating from 1821 to 1823, when the Overseers' Cottages were built. The timbers were raised after the completion of the excavation and will be conserved.

At the rear of the allotments, the fencelines and divisions of the kitchen gardens were revealed by excavation. There was clear evidence of hoe or spade cultivation using convict labour, as well as uncultivated areas used as central pathways or roads.

The powers of the Commandant of the Penal Settlement were formally handed over to the Police Magistrate in 1832, the year following the opening up of the area to free settlement. The penal establishment was not however completely closed and continued to house "convict specials", invalids and the insane from 1833 until 1847. The residence of the Deputy Superintendent of Convicts and the Free Overseers continued in other uses in the 1830s, but only Cottage 3 survived beyond the end of the penal settlement.

Cottage 1 had been occupied by the Deputy Superintendent of Convicts up to 1830. By 1831 it was occupied by the Superintendent of Convicts, his original residence now being used for other purposes. The last known use during the 1830s was as the Survey Office, before demolition, since it lay within the newly laid out grid of streets. Cottages 2 and 3 were Overseer's Cottages, probably built in 1823 to house the newly appointed overseers. Cottage 2 was occupied in 1831 by William Branch, who had been an overseer from 1823 to 1832. During the later 1830s the house was used as the Police Clerk's Quarters, before being demolished, as it too was within the newly laid out street. Cottage 3 was the Post Office by 1831, later also the Police Clerks Quarters and then the residence of the Clerk of the Court, possibly until the 1850s or 1860s.

Development commenced in 1821 to 1822. Cottage 2 was demolished in the 1830s. Cottage 3 survived until the 1850s or 1860s. The School of Arts was built in the 1880s. The Town Hall was built in the 1890s. The site was redeveloped in the 1970s as the Civic Centre. Redevelopment as the Glasshouse commenced in 2006 and was completed in 2008.

The artifact assemblage from the site reveals the economic stagnation of the town, brought on not only by the economic depression of the 1840s, but also the departure of the penal establishment and military in 1847. The site was redeveloped in the 1880s as the School of Arts and in the 1890s it was joined by the Town Hall. The assemblages recovered from these buildings reveals a total reversal of fortune for the town, as both these institutions indicate a new level of affluence and wealth, not before seen on the property.

== Description ==
It is an archaeological site, comprising the remains of Overseers' Cottages 2 and 3, together with sections of brick barrel drain.

The site was subject to archaeological excavation in 2006 and remains of the Overseer's Cottages 2 and 3, together with part of the brick barrel drain will be on display in the completed Glasshouse development. The brick walls, cobble floors and foundation trenches of the Cottages survive intact. Sections of the brick barrel drain have been conserved in situ.

The brick walls, cobble floors and foundation trenches of the Cottages survive intact. Sections of the brick barrel drain have been conserved in situ.

== Heritage listing ==
Port Macquarie was established as a penal settlement for secondary punishment in 1821, but wound down to make way for free settlers in 1830. As a penal settlement it may be compared with the first settlements at Sydney, Parramatta and Norfolk Island, all of which were commenced in 1788. Port Macquarie shares many institutions and public buildings in common with these first settlements.

In terms of secondary punishment it may be compared with Newcastle (1804 - 1824) in New South Wales, and Moreton Bay in Queensland. A progression can be seen from Newcastle to Port Macquarie and finally Moreton Bay, in order to maintain the isolation of the penal settlements from the expanding free population.

The early 19th century development of the town shared many features in common with other similarly dated towns in New South Wales. A more unusual factor is the continuation of some of the institutions of the penal settlement to the mid-1840s

The cottages on the subject site are closely related to the function of the penal settlement from 1821 to 1830. With the changeover from penal settlement to town, they were either associated with the continuation of penal institutions in Port Macquarie until the 1840s or the development of the town until the 1860s.

The site continued its association with the cultural life and administration of the town with the construction of the School of Arts in 1884 and the Town Hall in 1891. These buildings were demolished in 1973 and 1972 respectively and a new civic centre erected.

The site has been associated with the administrators of the penal settlement (1821-1830) and then of the convict establishment for specials (1831-1846) and finally of the town (1831 onwards).

The site has a particular association with Captain Francis Allman, Commandant from March 1821-April 1824 (ADB listing), Lieutenant William E. B. Wilson, Engineer and Inspector of Public Works from 1821 - 1824, Stephen Partridge, Superintendent of Convicts from 1821 - November 1830 and William Branch, Overseer from February 1823 - 1832.

The site demonstrates aspects of the original plan of the penal settlement, in terms of the original street alignments, which were changed in 1830-1831 for the development of the town. Although the assistant superintendent's quarters and free overseers cottages formed only a small part of this layout, the layout of the penal settlement gave emphasis to the role of the military establishment, the governor, the church and various other institutions by their prominent location and landmark position in this layout.

The archaeological remains of Cottages 2–3 retain evidence of traditional and vernacular building techniques, including brick and slab construction, with timbers re-used and surviving in two wells. In addition the brick barrel drain exemplifies the use of traditional brick technology in the construction of drains.

The association of the site with the penal settlement has particular significance for groups associated with preserving the history of Port Macquarie, for example the Hastings and District Historical Society. This group would be keen to see the site conserved. On a broader scale, persons and groups, like the National Trust, interested in preserving the heritage of convict institutions and other sites would have concerns for the conservation of this site. The association of the site with the first Town Hall and School of Arts would also be considered an important association for Port Macquarie Hastings Council and the local community as a whole.

The archaeological remains of the assistant superintendent's quarters and free overseer's cottages contribute to our understanding of the administration of the penal establishment (1821-1830) and of the later town (1831 onwards).

The living space indicated on historical maps has been almost doubled by the complex sequence of buildings revealed by the archaeological evidence. The artifacts have revealed the living standards of the government occupants in the 1820s, followed by a downturn in standards in the 1840s -1870s, reflecting the economic stagnation of the early town. Finally the artifacts reveal the upturn in affluence of the town from the 1880s onwards, associated with the School of Arts, the centre of town social life in the 1880s and then the Town Hall from the 1890s.

Port Macquarie is rare for its continuing association with the housing and labour of convict specials until 1847, for which the former overseers cottages still performed an administrative and accommodation role.

Timbers from the earliest construction of slab buildings in Port Macquarie, dating from 1821 to 1823, recovered from the timber lined wells, are a very rare and early survival of organic materials and traditional building materials in New South Wales.

The historical and archaeological evidence reveals the principal characteristics of building technology used in the Penal Settlement at Port Macquarie. The predominant characteristics used at Port Macquarie may be compared and contrasted with the practices used at other establishments.

The evidence also reveals the spacious nature of accommodation for the Free Overseers and other government officials, which again may be compared with other similar institutions, The artifact evidence reveals a modest but comfortable standard of living, which may be compared with evidence from other similar sites.

The Overseers' Cottages Remains was listed on the New South Wales State Heritage Register on 13 August 2010 having satisfied the following criteria.

The place is important in demonstrating the course, or pattern, of cultural or natural history in New South Wales.

Port Macquarie was established as a penal settlement for secondary punishment in 1821, but wound down to make way for free settlers in 1830. As a penal settlement it may be compared with the first settlements at Sydney, Parramatta and Norfolk Island, all of which were commenced in 1788. Port Macquarie shares many institutions and public buildings in common with these first settlements. A progression can be seen from Newcastle to Port Macquarie and finally Moreton Bay, in order to maintain the isolation of the penal settlements from the expanding free population.

The early 19th century development of the town shared many features in common with other similarly dated towns in New South Wales. A more unusual factor is the continuation of some of the institutions of the penal settlement to the mid-1840s

Cottages 1–5 were probably built in 1823, to house the newly appointed Assistant Superintendent and Free Overseer. Cottage 1 was occupied by the Deputy Superintendent of Convicts up to 1830. By 1831 it was occupied by the Superintendent of Convicts, his original residence now being used for other purposes. The last known use during the 1830s was as the Survey Office, before demolition, since it lay within the newly laid out grid of streets.

Cottages 2 to 5 were Overseer's Cottages. Cottage 2 was occupied in 1831 by William Branch, who had been an overseer from 1823 to 1832. During the later 1830s the house was used as the Police Clerk's Quarters, before being demolished, as it too was within the newly laid out street. Cottage 3 was the Post Office by 1831, later also the Police Clerks Quarters and then the residence of the Clerk of the Court, possibly until the 1850s or 1860s.

After 1830, Cottage 4 (only partly on the subject site and not excavated) was used as a hotel, "The Settlers Arms", run by Charles Farrell, the second hotel license for Port Macquarie in 1830. Cottage 5 lies to the west of the site.

The cottages on the subject site are closely related to the function of the penal settlement from 1821 to 1830. With the changeover from penal settlement to town, they were either associated with the continuation of penal institutions in Port Macquarie until the 1840s or the development of the town until the 1860s.

The site continued its association with the cultural life and administration of the town with the construction of the School of Arts in 1884 and the Town Hall in 1891. These buildings were demolished in 1973 and 1972 respectively and a new civic centre erected.

The place has a strong or special association with a person, or group of persons, of importance of cultural or natural history of New South Wales's history.

The site has been associated with the administrators of the penal settlement (1821-1830) and then of the convict establishment for specials (1831-1846) and finally of the town (1831 onwards).

The site has a particular association with Captain Francis Allman, Commandant from March 1821-April 1824 (ADB listing), Lieutenant William E. B. Wilson, Engineer and Inspector of Public Works from 1821 - 1824, Stephen Partridge, Superintendent of Convicts from 1821 - November 1830 and William Branch, Overseer from February 1823 - 1832.

The place is important in demonstrating aesthetic characteristics and/or a high degree of creative or technical achievement in New South Wales.

The site demonstrates aspects of the original plan of the penal settlement, in terms of the original street alignments, which were changed in 1830-1831 for the development of the town. The layout of the penal settlement exemplifies the roles of the military establishment, the governor, the church and various other institutions by their prominent location and landmark positions in this layout.

The archaeological remains of Cottages 2–3 retain evidence of traditional and vernacular building techniques, including brick and slab construction, with timbers re-used and surviving in two wells. In addition the brick barrel drain exemplifies the use of traditional brick technology in the construction of drains.

The place has a strong or special association with a particular community or cultural group in New South Wales for social, cultural or spiritual reasons.

The association of the site with the penal settlement has particular significance for groups associated with preserving the history of Port Macquarie, for example the Hastings and District Historical Society. This group would be keen to see the site conserved. On a broader scale, persons and groups, like the National Trust, interested in preserving the heritage of convict institutions and other sites would be supportive of the conservation of this site.

The association of the site with the first Town Hall and School of Arts would also be considered an important association for Port Macquarie Hastings Council and the local community as a whole.

The place has potential to yield information that will contribute to an understanding of the cultural or natural history of New South Wales.

The archaeological remains of the assistant superintendent's quarters and free overseer's cottages contribute to our understanding of the administration of the penal establishment (1821-1830) and of the later town (1831 onwards).

The living space indicated on historical maps has been almost doubled by the complex sequence of buildings revealed by the archaeological evidence. The artifacts have revealed the living standards of the government occupants in the 1820s, followed by a downturn in standards in the 1840s -1870s, reflecting the economic stagnation of the early town. Finally the artifacts reveal the upturn in affluence of the town from the 1880s onwards, associated with the School of Arts, the centre of town social life in the 1880s and then the Town Hall from the 1890s.

The place possesses uncommon, rare or endangered aspects of the cultural or natural history of New South Wales.

Port Macquarie represents one of a small number of penal settlements in Australia. It is also rare for its continuing association with the housing and labour of convict specials (aged, incapacitatedand insane, and/or educated "gentlemen" convicts) until 1847, for which the former overseers cottages still performed an administrative and accommodation role.

Timbers from the earliest construction of slab buildings in Port Macquarie, dating from 1821 to 1823, were recovered from the timber lined wells, a very rare and early survival of organic materials and traditional building materials in New South Wales.

The place is important in demonstrating the principal characteristics of a class of cultural or natural places/environments in New South Wales.

The historical and archaeological evidence has combined to reveal the principal characteristics of building technology used in the Penal Settlement at Port Macquarie, both brick and slab construction. While construction techniques may vary in other penal settlements and places of secondary punishment, nonetheless the evidence has revealed the predominant characteristics used at Port Macquarie, which may be compared and contrasted with the practices used at other establishments.

The evidence has also combined to reveal the spacious nature of accommodation for the Free Overseers and other government officials, which again may be compared with other similar institutions, Finally the artifact evidence reveals a modest but comfortable standard of living, which may be compared with other similar sites, as and when the evidence becomes available.
