= Anglican Diocese of Bendigo =

Diocese of the Anglican Church of Australia

Coordinates: 36°45′44″S 144°16′58″E

Diocese of Bendigo
- Coat of arms

Location
- Ecclesiastical province: Victoria

Information
- Rite: Anglican
- Cathedral: St Paul's Cathedral

Current leadership
- Bishop: Matt Brain

Website
- Diocese of Bendigo
- Logo of the Diocese

The Anglican Diocese of Bendigo is a diocese of the Anglican Church of Australia. It is situated in the Bendigo region of the state of Victoria, Australia. Its geographic remit extends from that part of Victoria that lies north of the Great Dividing Range and west of the Goulburn River to the border with the state of South Australia. The diocesan cathedral is St Paul's Cathedral, Bendigo. The diocese was separated from the Diocese of Melbourne in 1902, with Henry Archdall Langley installed as the first bishop. The current bishop, Matt Brain, was installed on 17 February 2018.

== History ==
The diocese was separated from the Diocese of Melbourne in 1902, at the same time as the creation of the dioceses of Wangaratta and Gippsland. In 1977, the Diocese of St Arnaud, which had been separated from the Diocese of Ballarat in 1926, was disbanded and merged with Bendigo.

The original cathedral church of the diocese was All Saints, Bendigo, but since 1981 the cathedral church has been St Paul's. Since 17 February 2018, the Bishop of Bendigo has been Matt Brain.

The Gannawarra Cluster is an initiative by the diocese to provide a team of locally ordained clergy to offer ministry to three geographically connected parishes, Cohuna, Kerang, and Quambatook.

== Bishops of Bendigo ==
Bishops of Bendigo
No	From	Until	Incumbent	Notes
1	1902	1906	Henry Langley	Installed and enthroned 5 March 1902.
2	1907	1920	John Langley	Previously Archdeacon of Cumberland and a Canon of St Andrew's Cathedral, Sydney
3	1920	1938	Donald Baker	
4	1938	1957	Charles Riley CBE VD	Previously Archdeacon of Northam.
5	1957	1974	Ronald Richards	Previously Archdeacon of Ballarat.
6	1975	1991	Oliver Heyward	Later assistant to the Primate of Australia.
7	1992	1993	Ben Wright	Previously Archdeacon of Stirling, then of the Goldfields and finally of O’Connor.
8	1995	2002	David Bowden	Previously Archdeacon of the Central Coast, then of Newcastle.
9	2003	2017	Andrew Curnow AM	Previously Bishop of the Northern Region, Melbourne.
10	2018	present	Matt Brain	Previously Assistant Bishop in Canberra and Goulburn. Installed 17 February 2018.

== Deans of Bendigo ==
- 1902 John Christian MacCullagh (1st Dean of Bendigo)
- 1917 Wilfred Ernest Holtzendorff Percival
- 1928 Donald Haultain
- 1932 Edward Schweiger
- 1940 Wilfred Frederick Dau
- 1951 Charles Frederick Hulley
- 1956 Charles Lawrence Riley
- 1957 Ronald Edward Richards
- 1973 Alex G. McKenzie
- 1980 Ray Elliott
- 1986 John Bedford
- 1989 - 1993 John W. Stewart
- 2006 Peta Sherlock
- 2012 John Roundhill
- 2018 Elizabeth Dyke

== See also ==
- South East Bendigo
