= Langley (surname) =

Langley is a habitational surname from any of the numerous places named with Old English Lang (meaning ‘long’) + lēah (meaning ‘wood’ or ‘glade’)

== List of people with this surname ==
- A. DeWade Langley, American police officer
- Ambrose Langley (1870–1937), English football manager
- Anthony Langley (born 1954) British businessman
- Arthur Langley, previously Arthur Longbottom (footballer) (1933–2023), English football manager
- Batty Langley (1696–1751), English garden designer
- Beatrice Langley (1872–1958), English violinist
- Bob Langley (born 1939), English TV presenter
- Brendan Langley (born 1994), American football player
- Brian Langley, American politician
- Bruno Langley (born 1983), English actor
- Chris Langley (born 1980), English rugby league player
- Clint Langley (born 1970), English comic book artist
- Desmond Langley (1930–2008), English army officer
- Diane Langley, American politician
- Donna Langley-Shamshiri (born 1968), British movie executive and Chairwoman of Universal Pictures
- Doreen Moira Langley (1920–1998), Australian nutritionist and college administrator
- Dorothy Langley (1904–1969), American author
- Edmund of Langley, 1st Duke of York (1341–1402), English prince
- Edward Mann Langley (1851–1933), British mathematician
- Elizabeth Langley (born 1933), Canadian performer, choreographer, teacher and dramaturge
- Ella Langley (born 1999), American country music singer-songwriter
- Elmo Langley (1928–1996), American NASCAR driver
- Elizabeth Langley, née Elizabeth Cass (1863–1954), English victim of controversial court proceedings in 1887
- Esme Langley (1919–1991), English writer
- Eve Langley (1908 – c.1974), Australian novelist and poet
- Francis Langley (1548–1602), English theatre producer
- Frank Langley (1882–1946), Australian VFL football player
- Garrett Langley (fl. 2010s–2020s), American entrepreneur and co-founder and CEO of Flock Safety
- Gary Langley (born 1984), English rugby league player
- Geoffrey of Langley (fl. 1270–1294), English knight
- Gerard Langley, English musician with The Blue Aeroplanes
- Gil Langley (1919–2001), Australian cricketer
- Gill Langley (born 1952), British writer and animal-rights activist
- Harold D. Langley (1925–2020), American historian
- Harry Langley, English architect
- Henry Langley (disambiguation), several people
- Isaiah Langley (born 1996), American football player
- J. Batty Langley (1834–1914), English politician
- James Langley, (1916–1983), British soldier and intelligence officer
- Jamie Langley (born 1983), English rugby league player
- Jamie Langley (Miss Alabama) (born 1984), American broadcaster
- Jane Pickens Langley (1907–1982), American singer
- Jim Langley (1929–2007), English footballer
- John Langley (disambiguation), several people
- Katherine G. Langley (1888–1948), American congresswoman
- Kevin Langley (born 1964), English footballer
- Lee Langley, Scottish/Indian author
- Lesley Langley (born 1944), English beauty queen
- Matthew Langley, American photographer
- Michael Langley, American Lt. Gen.
- Mick Langley (died 2018), British snooker player
- Monica Langley, American journalist
- Morgan Langley (producer) (born 1974), American TV producer
- Morgan Langley (soccer) (born 1989), American soccer player
- Neva Jane Langley (1933–2012), American beauty queen
- Noel Langley (1911–1980), South African playwright
- Orville Edwin Langley (1908–1973), American judge
- R. F. Langley (Roger Francis Langley, 1938–2011), English poet
- Richard Langley (born 1979), Jamaican footballer
- Richard Langley (martyr) (died 1586), English martyr
- Richard Langley (priest) (1563–1615), Head Master of Eton College from 1591 to 1611
- Roger Langley (disambiguation), several people
- Samuel Pierpont Langley (1834–1906), scientist and early experimenter in crewed flight
- Scott Langley (born 1989), American golfer
- Thomas Langley (disambiguation), several people
- Tommy Langley (born 1958), English footballer
- Walter Langley (1852–1922), English artist
- Walter B. Langley (1921–1976), New York state senator

== Fictional characters ==
- Asuka Langley Soryu, a character from the anime series Neon Genesis Evangelion
- Cal Langley, a character from Roswell
- Paul Langley (Waterloo Road), a character from Waterloo Road
- The foster name of Princess Arianna, a character from the book series Unicorns of Balinor
