= Langley Hall (Bendigo) =

Mansion built in 1904

Coordinates: 36.7312°S 144.3060°E

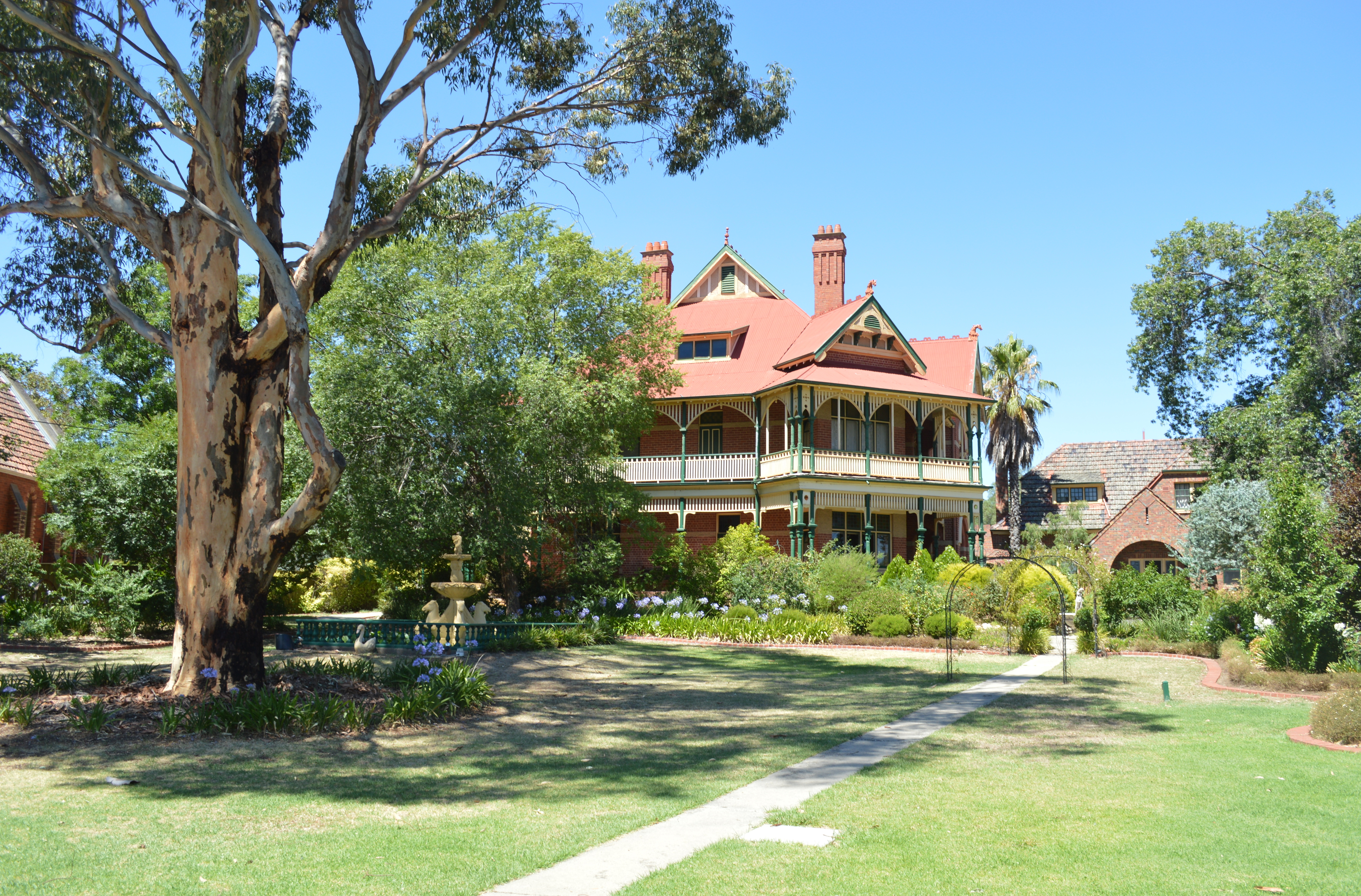
Langley Hall

Langley Hall is a mansion in the Federation architectural style, designed by the prolific Bendigo architects William Charles Vahland (1828–1915) and John Beebe (1866–1936). Built in 1904 as the Vahland-Beebe architectural partnership's largest commission, Langley Hall is located in Bendigo, Victoria, Australia. The mansion is part of the 2.5-acre Langley Estate situated on the corners of Napier Street (Midland Highway), Lyons Street and Dundas Street in White Hills and "remains one of the most prominent landmark buildings of the city".

The Langley Estate also contains a double-storey English Tudor-style residence, Langley Manor, designed and constructed in the 1930s. There is also a building formerly used as a chapel together with miscellaneous outbuildings including old stables and private courtyards.

== History ==
=== 1853–1903: Early history with the Anglican Church ===
The Reverend John Herbert Gregory, the first Anglican priest on the goldfields, arrived in Bendigo at the end of 1851. Gregory was later the founding priest of All Saints' Church, East St Kilda, Melbourne, and remained an influential priest in the Anglican high church tradition.

Gregory held the first Anglican service at White Hills in 1853. A brick schoolroom was built in 1856 and a parsonage was erected in 1857. In early 1863 it was announced that "The site for the new Church of England, at the White Hills, has been cleared." It was on this "elevated site in the church reserve" that the foundation stone for St Luke's Church, White Hills was laid on 27 May 1863 by the Revd W. R. Croxton. The architect for St Luke's Church was William Charles Vahland, who would design the mansion later named Langley Hall forty years later. St Luke's Church was opened on 24 November 1863 and remains as part of the Bendigo North group of parishes within the Anglican Diocese of Bendigo.

The Bendigo diocese was created in 1902 after separation from the Anglican Diocese of Melbourne. With the creation of the new diocese came the appointment of the first Anglican Bishop of Bendigo, Henry Archdall Langley, and a location was needed for Bishop Langley's residence. Planned to be a grand and imposing building, the proposed residence was originally referred to as either "Bishopscourt" or "The See House" (an episcopal, or bishop's "see", is another term for a diocese or area of a bishop's ecclesiastical jurisdiction).

In December 1902, it was suggested that White Hills be selected as the site for the new "Bishopscourt" or "See House" as St Luke's Church "has two or three acres of land connected with it lying idle ... The distance is barely three miles [from the Alexandra Fountain], but this is more than compensated for by a splendid road all the way, with a magnificent avenue of trees, making a suitable carriage drive to it."

Funds were raised for the building throughout 1903 and, in February 1904, it was announced that "The See House to be erected at White Hills is to be a handsome structure ... That it will be commodious is apparent ... A large verandah is to encompass three sides of the house, which will be constructed on lines best calculated to secure coolness and comfort. The building will be equipped with all modern improvements, including hot water service, lighting etc. The lowest tender for the work is £2600 and the See House committee expects to be in a position to commence building about the beginning of April next. The architects are Messrs Vahland and Beebe, and their work so far does them infinite credit."

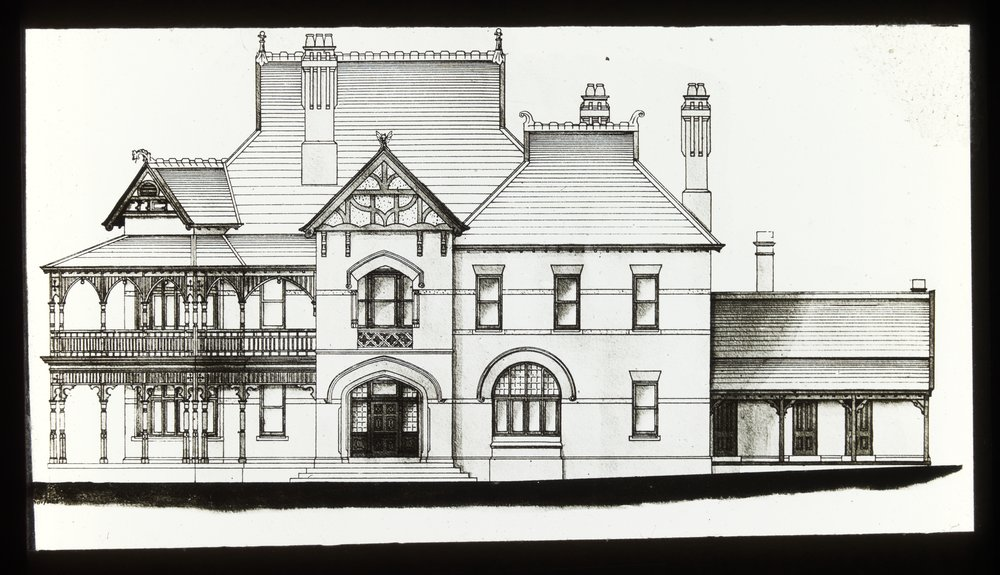
Vahland-Beebe drawing (1904)

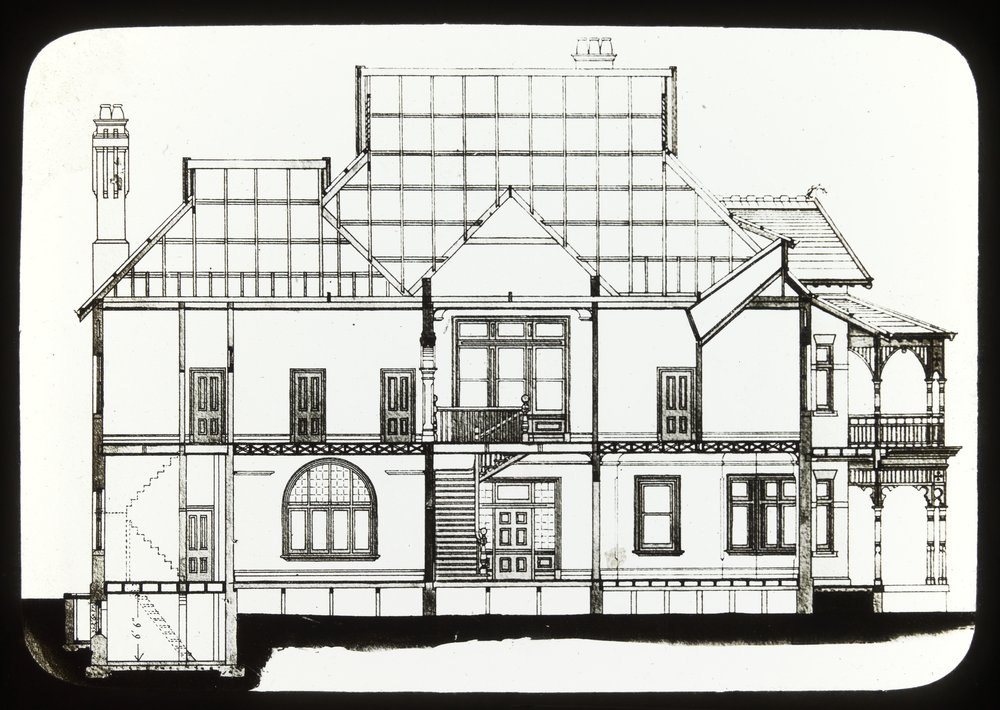
Vahland-Beebe drawing (1904)

=== 1904–1926: Bishopscourt ===
==== 1904–1919: Residence of Anglican bishops of Bendigo ====
Originally named "Bishopscourt", the mansion was built as the residence for the Anglican Bishop of Bendigo. The first two bishops, in a coincidental succession, were two brothers from the influential Irish immigrant Langley family. The younger brother, Henry Langley, served before the elder brother, John Langley. After the resignation of John Langley in 1919 the next bishop, Donald Baker, relocated to a Victorian-era mansion on a site closer to the then Anglican cathedral in Forest Street.

==== 1919–1926: "Diggers" Red Cross Convalescent Home ====
From 1919 to 1926 the Bishopscourt mansion was leased by the Australian Red Cross and housed returned soldiers from World War I, operating as the "Diggers" Red Cross Convalescent Home for returned Australian soldiers suffering shell shock and other mental and physical injuries sustained during the war. It was opened in the mansion on 3 December 1919 by Lady Helen Munro Ferguson, wife of the Governor General of Australia and president and founder of the Australian branch of the Red Cross.

=== 1927–: Langley Hall ===
==== 1927–1931: Bendigo Theological College ====
In 1927 the mansion was named Langley Hall, in honour of the Langley brothers who had served as the first two Anglican Bishops of Bendigo, when the building was used for five years as the home of the Bendigo Theological College in association with the Australian College of Theology, affiliated with the Anglican Church.

==== 1932–1979: St Luke's Toddlers' Home ====
From 1932 to 1979 the Langley Estate functioned as an orphanage managed by the Anglican Church. The orphanage, named St Luke's Toddlers' Home in reference to the adjacent St Luke's Church, White Hills, was originally operated by the Anglican Mission of St James and St John. Upon opening in June 1932, the toddlers' home catered for children from 18 months to 5 years of age. Over the subsequent decades, the home cared for older children as well and by the mid-1970s included adolescents. St Luke's Toddlers' Home closed in 1979 as part of a move towards family-based care provided by St Luke's Family Care which was established in 1979. Between 1932 and 1979, around 1,500 children had been residents at the home. In 1997 the Mission of St James and St John became part of Anglicare Victoria.

Although, in the 1950s, inspectors from the Children's Welfare Department described the buildings as "large" and "old-fashioned", it is probable the institutional use of the property saved the Langley Estate from demolition and subdivision through the 1960s and 1970s.

==== 1980–2000: Disuse and subsequent use ====
After a short period in the early 1980s when the various buildings on the Langley Estate were unoccupied and its future was uncertain, the property passed from the Diocese of Bendigo into private ownership and was used as a restaurant and reception centre.

Subsequently, in the mid-1980s, there was "a plan to build 12 motel units in front of the house and to gut the old building ... That would have been the end of it."

However, the Langley Estate was saved by the Lowery and Looker families and from 1988 to 1991 initial restoration work began on the Federation-style mansion. During this period the Langley Estate was used as an antique centre. The gardens also responded "to the care now being paid them. A pond and fountain which had been buried for decades are now functional again, and hundreds of roses, shrubs and trees replanted".

==== 2001–present: Wedding and conference venue, bed and breakfast ====
Since 2001, the Langley Estate has operated as a wedding and conference venue and also for bed and breakfast accommodation.
