= Henry Langley =

Henry Langley may refer to:

- Henry Langley (architect) (1836–1907), Canadian architect
- Henry Langley (bishop) (1840–1906), first Anglican bishop of Bendigo
- Henry Langley (Dean of Melbourne) (1877–1968), Anglican priest in Australia
- Henry Langley (Master of Pembroke) (1611–1679), English academic, priest and Master of Pembroke College, Oxford
- Henry Langley (cricketer) (1846–1884), English cricketer

== See also ==
- Harry Langley, architect
