= William Langley =

William Langley may refer to:

- William Langley of the Langley Baronets
- William Langley (actor)
- William Langley (Oregon politician)
