= John Langley (disambiguation) =

John Langley (1943–2021) was an American television and film director.

John Langley may also refer to:

== Politicians ==
- John Langley (MP) (fl. 1653), English merchant and politician
- John Langley (mayor), Lord Mayor of London 1576
- John Langley (MP for Gloucestershire), MP for Gloucestershire 1429,1432,1435–1447
- John de Langley, MP for Coventry
- John W. Langley (1868–1932), American congressman

== Others ==
- John Langley (bishop) (1836–1930), Anglican bishop of Bendigo
- John Baxter Langley (1819–1892), British political activist and newspaper editor
- John Newport Langley (1852–1925), British physiologist
- Art Langley (John Arthur Langley, 1896–1967), American ice hockey player
- John Langley (rugby league), rugby league footballer of the 1960s and 1970s
- John Langley (cricketer) (1918–1996), English cricketer
- John Langley, English musician, member of The Blue Aeroplanes
