= Bishop of Bendigo =

Bishop of Bendigo may refer to:

- Anglican Bishop of Bendigo
- Bishop of the Roman Catholic Diocese of Sandhurst
