= Langler =

Langler is a surname. Notable people with the surname include:

- Alfred Langler (1865–1928), Australian journalist and newspaper editor
- Max Langler, Mexican actor

== See also ==
- Langer
- Langley (surname)
