= Roger Langley (disambiguation) =

Roger Langley is a ski administrator.

Roger Langley may also refer to:

- R. F. Langley, English poet and diarist
- Roger Langley of the Langley Baronets
