= Harold Napier Baker =

Australian Anglican priest

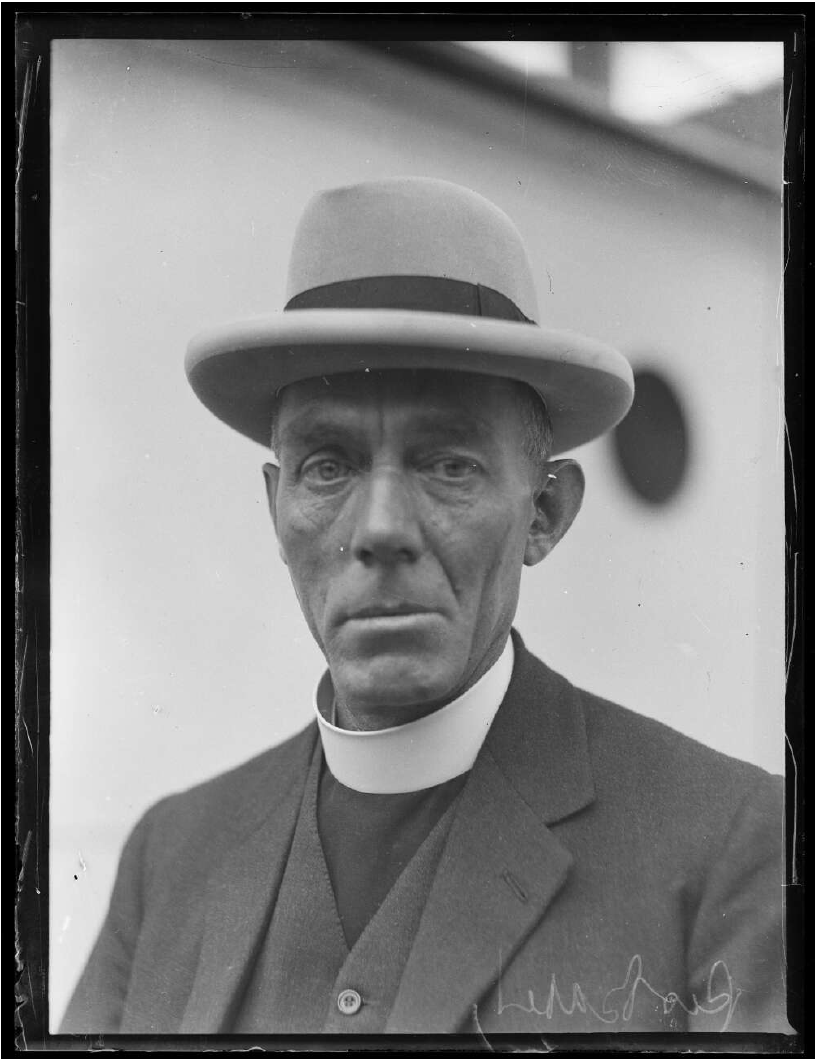
Baker in 1930

Harold Napier Baker (c. 1877 – 4 July 1950), often referred to as Canon Baker, was an Anglican priest, for many years rector of St Thomas' Anglican Church, North Sydney, Australia.

== Life ==
Baker was born in Masulipatam, Southern India, where his father was a worker with the Church Missionary Society. He was educated at Nelson College, New Zealand, and graduated BA at the University of New Zealand in 1900.

He came to Australia in 1901 and was ordained in 1902.

Baker was at one time curate of St Mary's Anglican Church, Balmain, followed by temporary placements at Holy Trinity and St Peter's, Sydney.

He was rector of St Peter's, East Sydney, from 1904 to 1913; he graduated MA at Sydney University in 1912.

He was rector of St John's, and Rural Dean of Launceston, Tasmania, from 1913 to 1919.

In 1919 he was appointed as rector of St Thomas', where he remained until his retirement in 1945, when he was appointed Rural Dean of North Sydney.

He died at St Ives Hospital, North Sydney, aged 73, after a short illness. His remains were cremated at the Northern Suburbs Crematorium after a service at St Thomas' Church.

== Other interests ==
Baker was interested in amateur theatre, and wrote several plays on Biblical subjects, presented at St Thomas' Memorial Hall:

- The King of Love in March 1938, and revived a year later.
- Thy Kingdom Come in March 1940
- Miriam in August 1950.

Players were members of the congregation of St Thomas' and, in at least one production, pupils of Wenona School, and the Church of England Grammar School for Girls, North Sydney.

He has been credited with founding the Christian Social Order Movement and was recognised as one of the leading scholars of the Australian Church of England.

== Family ==
Baker married Dora Smith on 5 December 1938 and had two children, a son and a daughter.

Rev. William J. Baker, about whom nothing has been found, was a brother. as was Donald Baker (1882–1968), Anglican Bishop of Bendigo from 1920 to 1938.
