= Wilfred Percival =

Anglican priest

Wilfred Ernest Holtzendorff Percival (died 1935) was an Anglican priest in the last decade of the 19th century and the first third of the 20th century.

Percival was educated at St John's College, Auckland, the University of New Zealand and the University of Melbourne. He was ordained deacon in 1884, and priest in 1885. He served curacies at Randwick in Sydney, and South Yarra in Melbourne. He was Rector of Sale, Victoria. He held incumbencies at Lara, Essendon, Bendigo, and Armadale. He was Archdeacon of Bendigo from 1915 to 1917; and Dean of Bendigo from 1917 to 1927.

He died on 20 January 1935.
