= Shelford Girls' Grammar =

Girls' day school in Caulfield, Victoria, Australia

Location
- Caulfield, Victoria; Australia; 37°52′39″S 145°0′41″E

Information
- Type: Independent, single-sex, day school
- Motto: Latin: Quaerite Primo Regnum Dei (Seek ye first the Kingdom of God)
- Denomination: Anglican
- Established: 1898
- Principal: Pauline Cutajar
- Chaplain: Erin Juers
- Years offered: P–12
- Gender: Girls
- Enrolment: ~600
- Slogan: Thrive
- Affiliation: Girls Sport Victoria
- Website: www.shelford.vic.edu.au

Shelford Girls' Grammar (previously known as Shelford Girls' School, Shelford Church of England Girls' Grammar School, and sometimes SCEGGS) was an independent Anglican day school for girls. It was located in Caulfield, a suburb of Melbourne, Victoria, Australia.

The school was established in 1898, and before it closed (at the end of 2024) it was a member of Girls Sport Victoria (GSV), the Junior School Heads Association of Australia (JSHAA) and the Alliance of Girls' Schools Australasia. It was a non-selective entry school, with more than 600 students.

Shelford had a coeducational Early Learning Centre, which educated toddlers 18 months old, as well as providing groups for 3 and 4-year-olds.

Shelford offered students the Victorian Certificate of Education (VCE) program, and the Vocational Education and Training (VET) course.

After 127 years in operation, the last classes were held in December 2024. In 2025, the school merged with Caulfield Grammar School with some Shelford students transferring to CGS at the start of that year. The school is now known as Caulfield Grammar School Shelford Campus.

== History ==
The school was established in 1898 on Glen Eira Road by Emily Dixon.

The school was relocated to 77 Allison Road, Elsternwick, by Dora Mary Petrie Blundell, who served as the school's second principal from 1904 to 1921. Dora was supported by her sisters, Lucy Annie Blundell, Fanny Blundell, and Margaret Helen Petrie Blundell.

As the vicar of St Mary's Anglican Church in Caulfield, Henry Langley had been giving the pupils of Shelford Girls' School weekly lessons in religious instruction for many years. In 1922, the Blundell sisters wished to give the school to the church. They approached Archdeacon Langley, who was responsible for its temporary move from 77 Allison Road, Elsternwick, to St Mary's Jubilee School Hall. The Argus reported on the re-opening and Archdeacon Langley's appointment of Ada Mary Thomas as the school's head mistress:

There was a large gathering of residents of Caulfield and Elsternwick, including several of the neighbouring clergy, to witness the formal reopening of Shelford Girls' School, a long-established Elsternwick school, as a girls' school and kindergarten in connection with St. Mary's Church, Caulfield.
Bishop Green, in declaring the school open, congratulated the vicar (Canon Langley) on an initial enrolment of 60 pupils.
The mayor of Caulfield (Councillor [Thomas] Falls) and the Rev. [James Valentine] Patton, of Sydney, also spoke.
Canon Langley said that the school is to be called by the old name of Shelford, but will be carried on as a Church of England school, under a local council, with A. M. Thomas as principal.
It is proposed to build up-to-date school buildings at a site for a branch church near the Caulfield Town Hall [viz., St Margaret's], but for the present the school will meet in the existing school buildings at St. Mary's, Caulfield. — The Argus, 23 February 1922.

The following year, Archdeacon Langley moved the school to "Helenslea" in Hood Crescent, Caulfield North. The school was officially opened at its new location by Archbishop Lees on 22 February 1923 adjacent to St Mary's Church as the Shelford Girls' Grammar School.

In 2025, the school merged with Caulfield Grammar School with some Shelford students transferring to CGS at the start of 2025. The school is now known as Caulfield Grammar School Shelford Campus.

== Headmistresses ==
- Miss Emily Dixon - 1898 to 1903
- Miss Dora Mary Petrie Blundell - Acting 1903/04, 1905 to 1921
- Miss Ada Mary Thomas - 1922 to 1944
- Miss Judith Thewlis - Acting 1943, 1944 to 1952
- Miss Violet Baddams - 1953 to 1963
- Miss Ida Washington - 1964 to 1972
- Miss Jean Myers - 1973 to term 1 1979
- Ms Elizabeth Britten - 1979 to 1991
- Ms Pam Chessell - 1992 to 2009
- Ms Polly Flanagan - 2010 to 2019
- Ms Katrina Brennan - 2020 to 2023
- Pauline Cutajar - 2024

== Houses ==
The House System was introduced in 1928 with the first four houses named Blundell, Thomas, Langley and School House. Most grammar schools had a School House and traditionally the students who boarded were allocated to this group. In the 1920s Shelford had plans to take boarders, but never did. In 1934 School House was renamed Lloyd. The house system enabled students to participate in inter-house competitions.

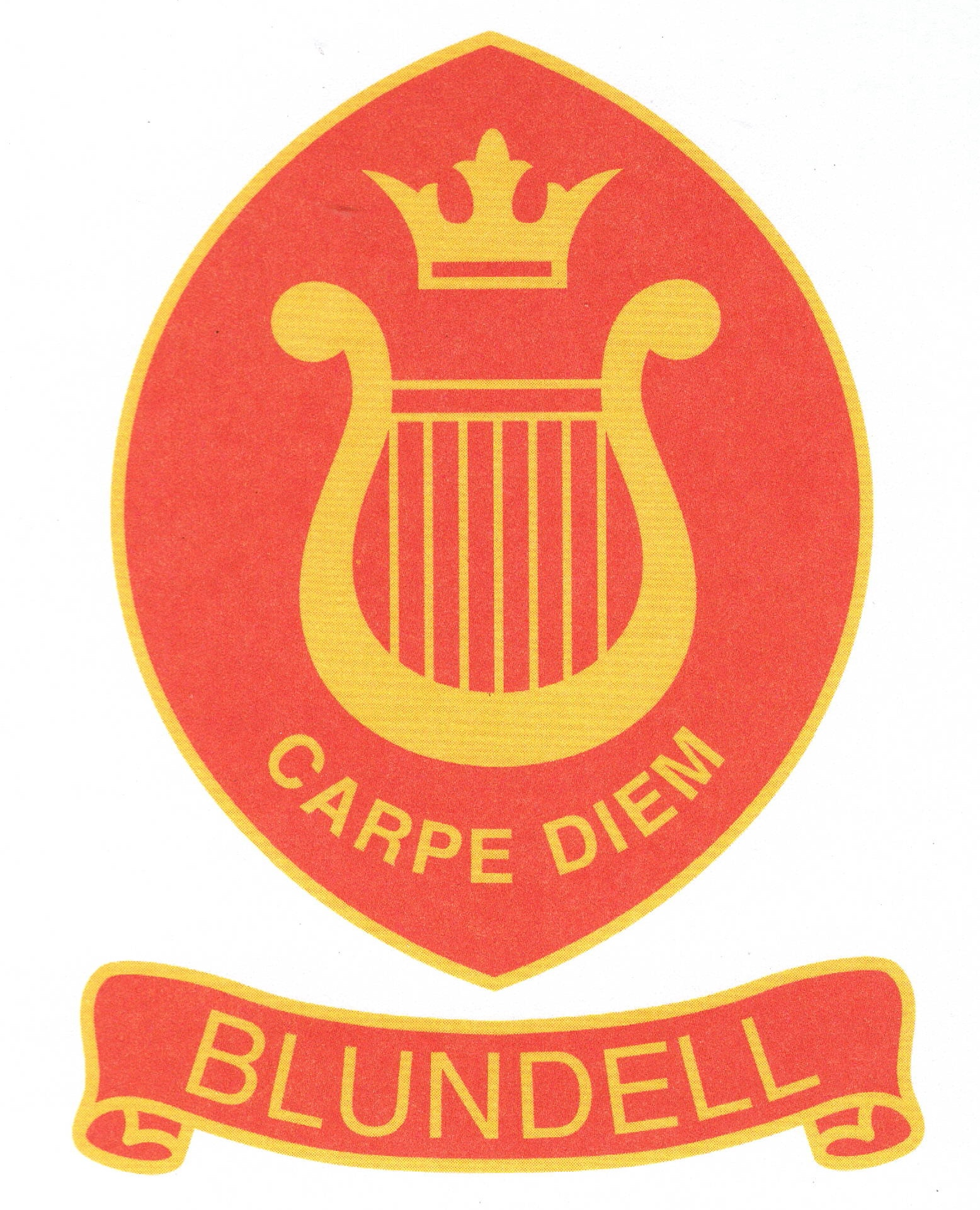

Blundell House - Carpe Diem - Seize the Day / Do It Now

Dora Blundell was born one of 12 children (8 daughters and 4 sons) to Martin Petrie Blundell (1813-1885) and Sophia Sarah Murray (1822-1885). Her father was a wealthy merchant and the family lived in St. Kilda. The Blundell sisters (Dora, Fanny, Lucy, Margaret and Florence) were educated at Presbyterian Ladies College (PLC) and Dora matriculated from the University of Melbourne with second class honours in English and History in 1882, before entering the workforce as a teacher. In 1868, Fanny Blundell entered the Teacher Training Institute run by Emily Dixon's father Stephen Chancellor Dixon; this interaction between the Dixon and Blundell families is a crucial moment in the history of Shelford's foundation. Dora began teaching at Shelford shortly after it opened in 1898.

Supporting Emily Dixon, Dora became the School's acting Headmistress in 1904 and then fully assumed the role from 1905. She moved Shelford from a little house on Glen Eira Road to her home at 77 Allison Road, Elsternwick. Teaching students with her sister Fanny, Dora led the School through World War One until her retirement in 1921. Dora always kept a close association with Shelford, sitting on the School Board, teaching Divinity and attending sports days until the mid-1930s. Blundell House was named after Dora in 1928. Dora Blundell died in 1943. Her possessions were left to her surviving sister Margaret and a number of nieces that she was close to. She is buried with her sisters Fanny and Lucy at Brighton Cemetery.

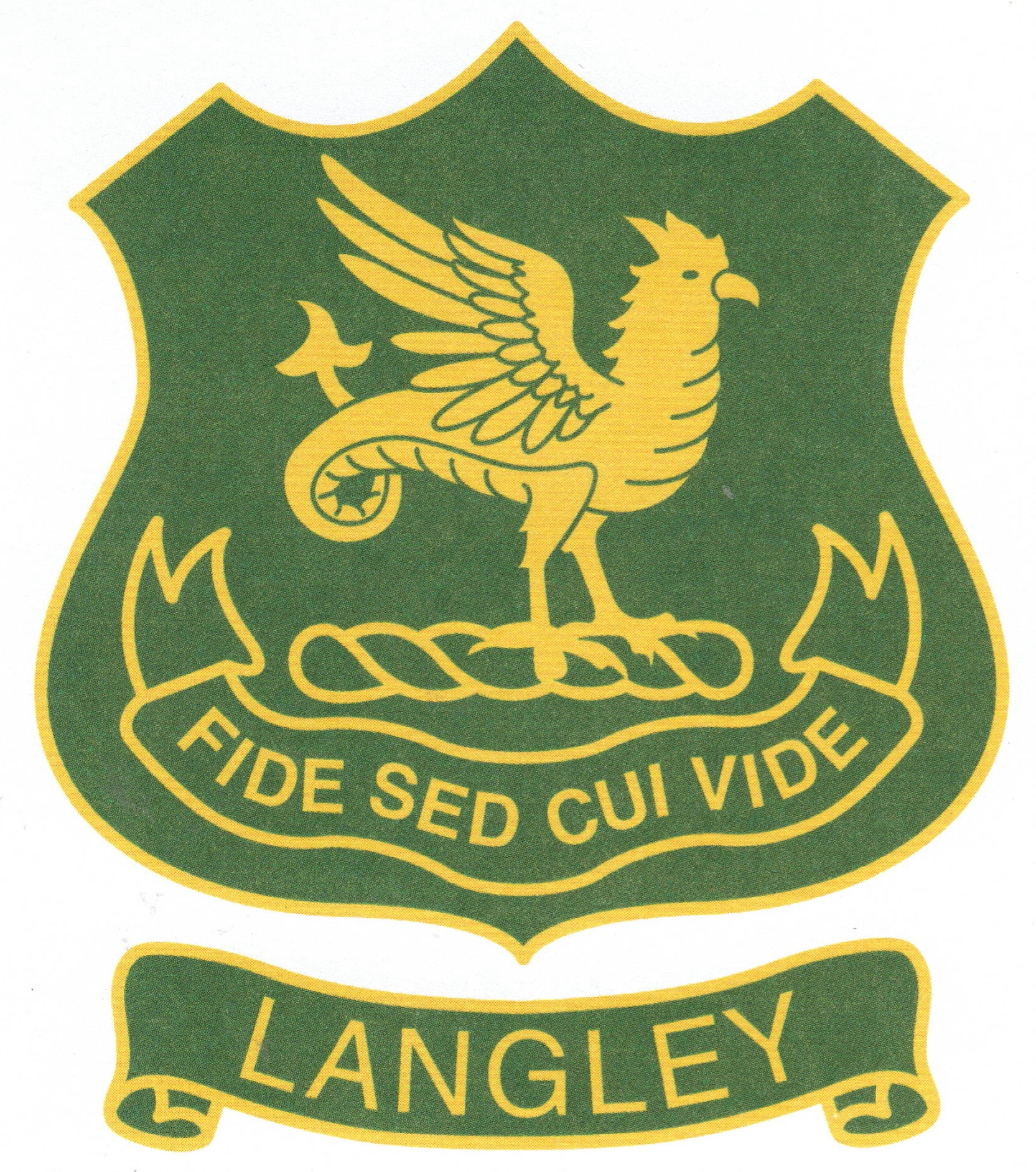

Langley House - Fide Sed Cui Vide - Trust, but be careful whom you trust

Henry Thomas Langley (known as Tom) was born the sixth of twelve children to Bishop Henry Archdall Langley (1840-1906), an Irish-born clergyman, and his wife Elizabeth Mary, née Strachan. Langley was educated at Caulfield Grammar School before attending the University of Melbourne (B.A., 1899; M.A., 1904). While at university, he helped to found the Student Christian Movement. Made deacon on 10 June 1900, he was ordained a priest on 2 June 1901 and married Ethel Maud Du Vé in September of that year too.

During his incumbency (1911–42) at St. Mary's Caulfield, he was appointed a chaplain in the Australian Military Forces in 1916 and a canon of St. Paul's Cathedral, Melbourne, in 1918. In 1920 he set up a board to superintend Religious Education in Anglican communions in Australia and New Zealand. In 1921 he founded Shelford Church of England Girls' Grammar School. A council-member of Melbourne Church of England and Caulfield Grammar schools, he had something of his father's drive and interest in education. He was also much involved in the Mission of St. James and St. John, and in the Church of England Boys and Mens, the Church Missionary and the Bush Church Aid societies. Langley's daughter Grace attended Shelford during the late 1920s and early 1930s.

In 1942 Langley was elected Dean of Melbourne. He associated himself with socialist movements and marched annually in the May Day procession. After retiring in 1947, he took a leading part in 1950 in negotiating an amendment to the Victorian Education Act (1928), allowing government schools to engage chaplains. In addition, he chaired the Council for Christian Education in Schools. Langley enjoyed gardening, fishing, tennis (when younger) and excursions in the country. Survived by his daughter and three of his four sons, he died on 28 November 1968 in Hawthorn.

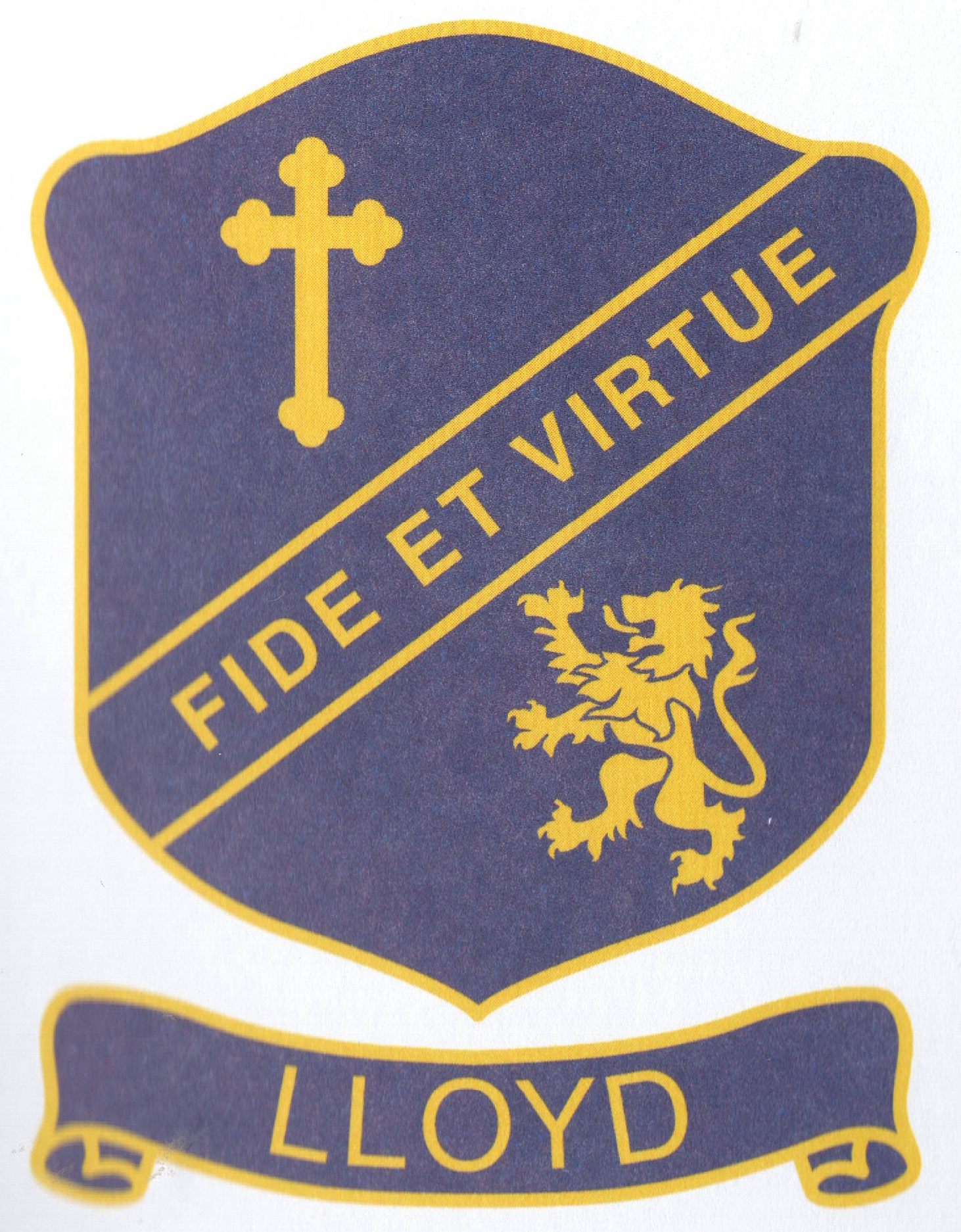

Lloyd House - Fide Et Virtue - By fidelity and virtue/courage

Maurice Charles Lloyd was born in Broadford, Victoria on 24 December 1890 to Charles Edward Lloyd (1843-1905) and Johanna Wilhelmina Zander (1851-1905). The youngest of eight children Maurice was known as M.C. ("Em-cee") or "Motts". M.C. was sent to Melbourne Grammar School to board for his education. After both his parents died in 1905, M.C. did not go back to Broadford preferring to stay with his Uncle Leonard in Albert Park. After graduation, M.C. joined the parish of St. Mary's Caulfield where he worked as a Sunday School teacher before joining the Vestry. During World War One, M.C. served in France with the 10th Field Company of Engineers, in the Pay Corps. Returning from service in March 1919, M.C. was married at St. Mary's (by Reverend Henry Thomas Langley) to Doris Read in 1920.

M.C. Lloyd became a very successful businessman. He was a local of the Caulfield area and a parishioner at St. Mary's for most of his post-war life. Joining the St. Mary's Vestry as its secretary around 1920, M.C. worked with Canon Langley to bring Shelford Girls' School to the Church and secure Helenslea for school purposes. M.C. is a signatory on the mortgage papers for Helenslea and loans that were taken to renovate it. He also sat on the School Council as its secretary and was responsible for balancing the School's finances. Shelford's early years after joining the church (1922-1945) were tough.

M.C. was a major patron of the school and acted as a personal guarantor during the Depression. In 1934, School House was renamed Lloyd in his honour and the House colour was changed to purple. M.C.'s regiment in the war was purple and he chose the colour himself. Working with Shelford up until his death in 1952, the funeral cortege went past the School and students lined the street to pay their respects. M.C.'s daughters Nona and Judy also attended Shelford.

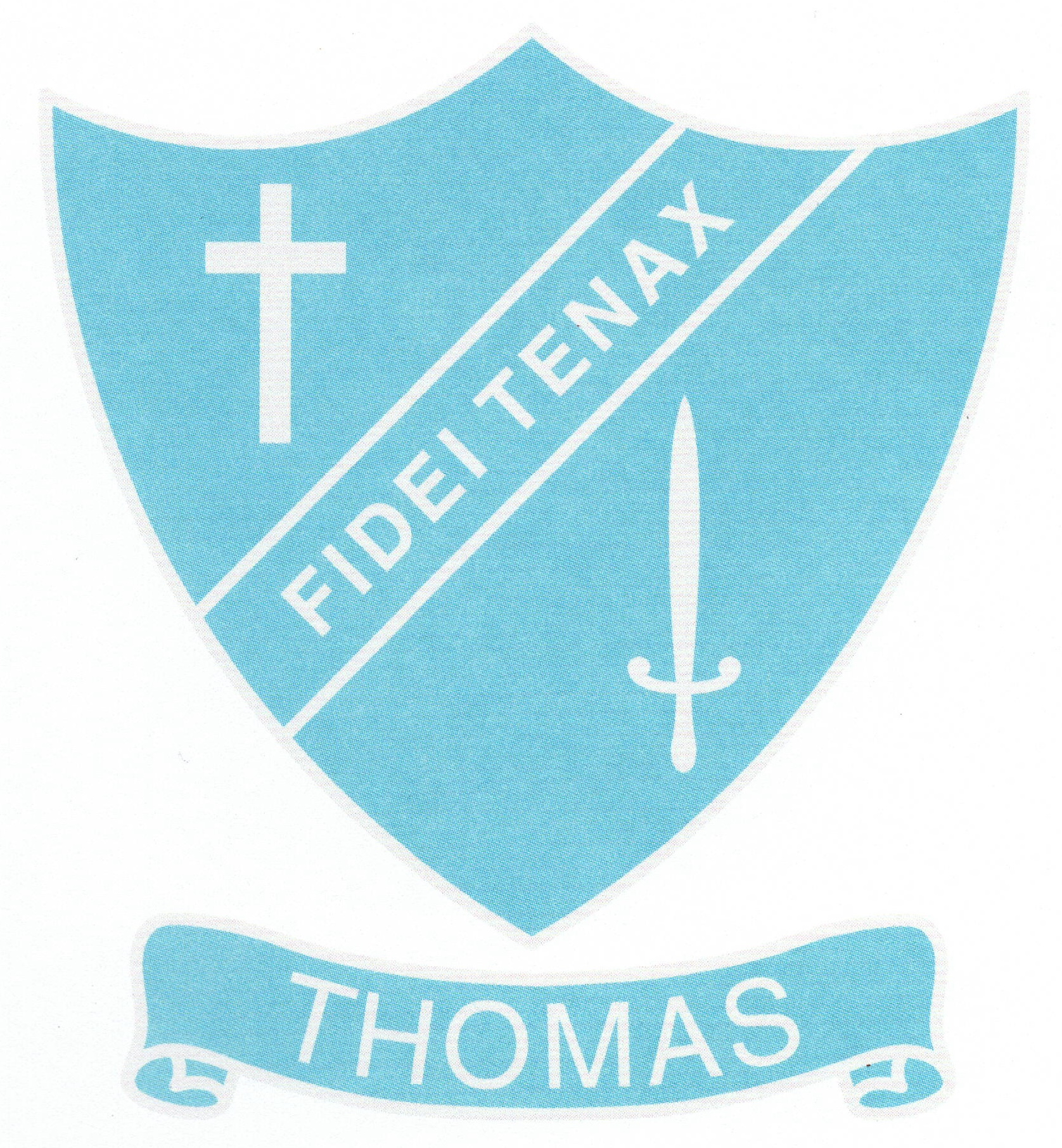

Thomas House - Fidei Tenax - Firm to my trust/faith

Having led the school for 22 years, Ada Thomas is Shelford's longest serving Principal. Born in Kiewa, Victoria to Thomas Vivian Thomas (1859-1947) and Mary Nichol (1861-1921), Ada's family were graziers of Cornish descent. Ada's father worked in the same farming circles as Dora Blundell's brother-in-law Samual Penrose Jessop (married to Florence Blundell) and it is believed this is how Ada became connected with the school. Moving to Melbourne to work at Shelford after the death of her mother, Miss Thomas's legacy at Shelford is a significant one. At the beginning of 1922, Shelford was transferred from Dora Blundell to St. Mary's Church, and Canon Langley appointed Ada to the position of Principal. Miss Thomas quickly developed a reputation for high standards in teaching and learning.

Aside from having Thomas House names after her in 1928, Miss Thomas created a number of traditions at Shelford during her tenure. The first was a whole school celebration of her birthday each year on 19 June. This often involved a trip to the theatre with the Old Grammarians, with supper afterwards at a restaurant in the city. The other was a highly anticipated Prefect's Weekend held around November each year, where Miss Thomas would take the Prefects away to Frankston or the Dandenong Ranges for a weekend of adventure. Students remember Miss Thomas sitting in the same seat, in the same pew at the back of St. Mary's Church during weekly service and having to submit the names of male partners to Miss Thomas for approval prior to the School Dance. We also know that Miss Thomas was superstitious and didn't like the colour green.

In 1944, suffering from breast cancer and mourning the death of her sister Daisy, Miss Thomas retired from her position as Principal. She spent her last years in Beechworth with her family.

== School song ==
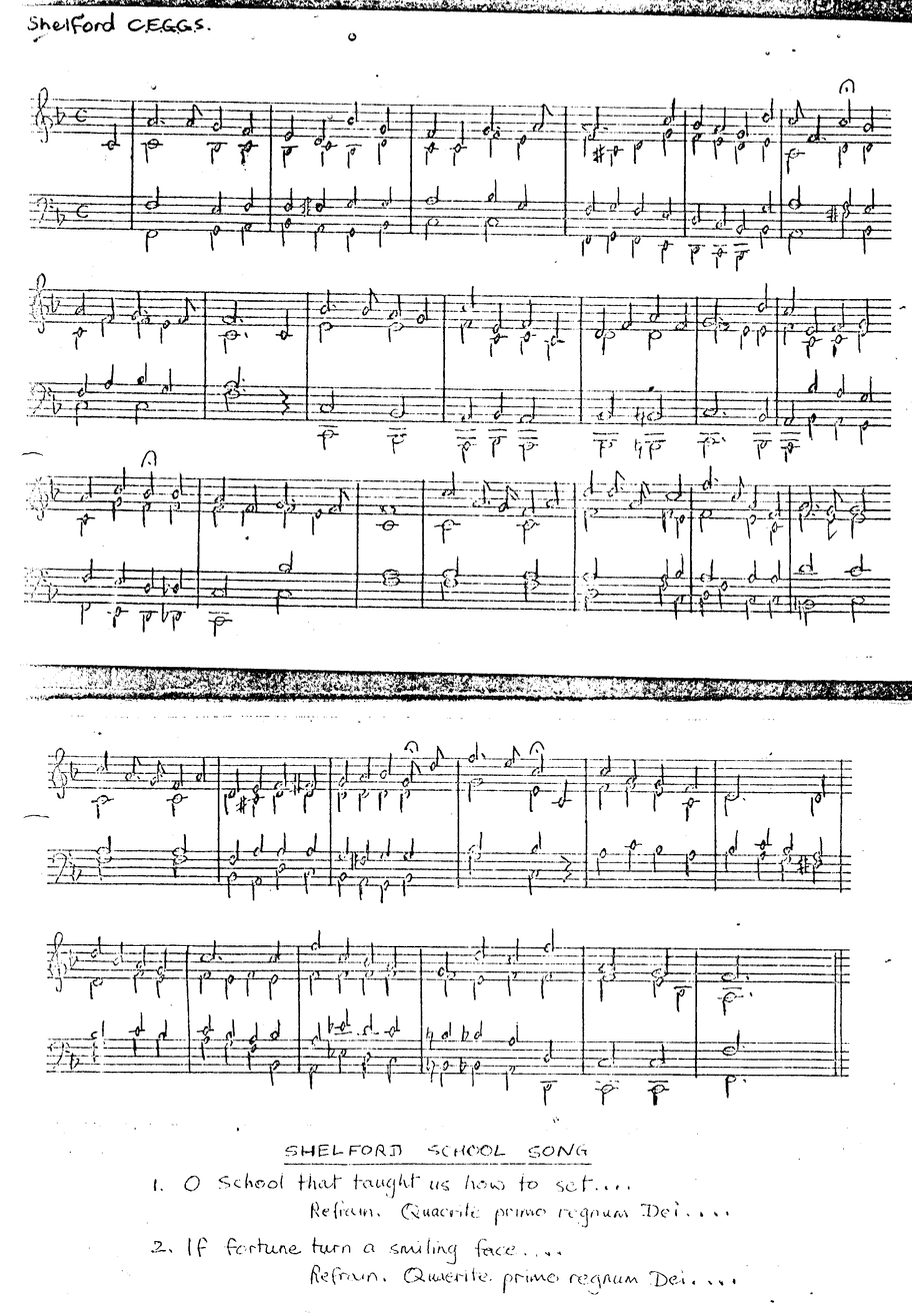
The Shelford School Song. Words: Marie E.J. Pitt. Music: Welsford Smithers, Esq.

O School that taught us how to set the game above the prize,
We’ll hold your name in honour yet, though far each pathway lies.
The love that found the way for us, the faith that held us fast,
Will journey day by day with us, as long as life doth last.
Quaerite Primo Regnum Dei, lift your voices gladly sing.
Quaerite Primo Regnum Dei, we lift our voices and gladly sing.
Our credo and our school, our credo and our school, our credo and our school, our school forever.

If fortune turns a smiling face, or fills our hearts with rue,
In temple or in market-place, we will remember you.
Your name shall in truth to us, as life’s long hill we climb,
Bring back the wells of youth to us, the tents of morning time.
Quaerite Primo Regnum Dei, lift your voices gladly sing.
Quaerite Primo Regnum Dei, we lift our voices and gladly sing.
Our credo and our school, our credo and our school, our credo and our school, our school forever.

== Notable alumnae ==
- Stella Barton – Paralympian, para-equestrian
- Brigitte Duclos – television and radio presenter
- Lola Graham – pianist
- Olympia Valance – actor
- Krystal Weir – Olympian

== See also ==
- List of schools in Victoria
