= Thomas Langley (disambiguation) =

Thomas Langley (c. 1363–1437) was an English catholic bishop.

Thomas Langley is also the name of:

- Thomas Langley (priest) (died 1581), English Anglican canon at Winchester Cathedral
- Tommy Langley (born 1958), English professional association football player
- Sir Thomas Langley, 4th Baronet (died 1762), of the Langley baronets (of Higham Gobion)
