= Frank Langley =

Australian rules footballer (1882-1946)

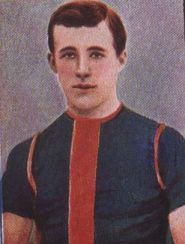

Personal information
- Full name: Francis Ernest Langley
- Born: 13 October 1882; Prahran
- Died: 22 March 1946 (aged 63); Dandenong, Victoria
- Original team: Caulfield Grammar
- Height: 177 cm (5 ft 10 in)
- Weight: 71 kg (157 lb)
- Position: Defender

Playing career^{1}
Years	Club	Games (Goals)
1900–1906	Melbourne	89 (61)

Representative team honours
Years	Team	Games (Goals)
1903–1904	Victoria	
- ^{1} Playing statistics correct to the end of 1906.

Career highlights
- VFL premiership player: 1900; Melbourne captain: 1905; Melbourne leading goalkicker: 1901

Francis Ernest Langley (13 October 1882 – 22 March 1946) was an Australian rules footballer who played for the Melbourne Football Club in the Victorian Football League (VFL) during the early 1900s.

== Family ==
The son of Henry Archdall Langley (1840–1906), Anglican Bishop of Bendigo, and Elizabeth Mary Langley (1842–1923), née Strachan, and the tenth of 12 children, Langley was born at Prahran on 13 October 1882. One of his elder brothers, Henry Thomas Langley, became Dean of Melbourne, while many of his other siblings took roles within the Anglican church and the education system.

He married Lillie Kate Mills (1876–1967), the daughter of George Peter Mills (1835–1933), and Mary "Minnie" Mills (1848–1913), née Kyte, on 25 April 1908.

== Education ==
Langley was educated at Caulfield Grammar School, and at Trinity College, University of Melbourne where he earned a Bachelor of Medicine, Bachelor of Surgery degree. After completing university he worked as a medical practitioner.

== Footballer ==
He was recruited directly from Caulfield Grammar School in 1900.

"In Langley, the Melbourne footballer, Caulfield has the champion player of the schools. He has been first in every game, and in the last two seasons has kicked 33 goals in 11 premiership games." — The Australasian, 15 September 1900.

While continuing as a student at Caulfield Grammar School, he played every senior game that season, and was forward pocket in the Melbourne team that won the Grand Final that year, with "Old Boy", the football correspondent for The Argus noting that, for Melbourne, "Langley's play in the third quarter was wonderful. He is only a school-boy, but during that trying time on the lower wing he was cool and sure as a veteran".

Langley could play many roles on the field but was primarily a hard running defender who on occasions was used on the ball. He was often rested up forward and his 17 goals in 1901 was enough to top Melbourne's goal kicking. In 1903, and 1904, he represented Victoria at interstate football. In 1905 he captained Melbourne for the year, with the club finishing last.

== After football ==
Conducting his medical practice from Dandenong, he was not only a valuable cricketer for the Dandenong Cricket Club, but also served as its president.

== Death ==
Langley died at his home in Dandenong in 1946. He was survived by his wife Lillie and three children, Dorothy, Eric and Roy.

== See also ==
- List of Caulfield Grammar School people
