= John MacCullagh =

John Christian MacCullagh (1832–1917) was an Anglican priest in the second half of the 19th century and the first two decades of the 20th century.

MacCullagh was educated at Moore College. He was ordained deacon in 1884, and priest in 1885. After a curacy at Lancefield he was the incumbent at St Paul, Bendigo from 1870 until 1902. He was Archdeacon of Bendigo from 1883 to 1902; and Dean of Bendigo from 1902 to 1917.
