= Roscoe Wilson =

Alfred Roscoe Wilson OBE (1882–1964) was the Anglican Dean of Melbourne from 1947 until 1953.

Wilson was educated at the University of Melbourne and ordained in 1909. His first post was as the Minister at Ivanhoe. After this he was at Balwyn and then Camberwell. He was Rural Dean of Hawthorn from 1925 to 1934; the incumbent at Kew from 1934 to 1944; and Archdeacon of Kew from 1942 until 1947.

Religious titles
Preceded by Henry Thomas Langley	Dean of Melbourne; 1947–1953	Succeeded by Stuart Barton Babbage
