= Henry Langley (Dean of Melbourne) =

Australian Anglican priest (1877–1968)

The Very Reverend Henry Langley
- Born: Henry Thomas Langley; 30 March 1877; Windsor, New South Wales
- Died: 28 November 1968 (aged 91); Hawthorn, Victoria
- Education: University of Melbourne
- Title: Dean of Melbourne
- Spouse: Ethel Maud Du Ve (m. 1901)
- Children: 4 sons; 1 daughter
- Parent(s): Henry Archdall Langley (1840-1906); Elizabeth Mary née Strachan
- Church: Anglican

Orders
- Ordination: 1900 (deacon); 1901 (priest)

Personal details
- Denomination: Anglican

Henry Thomas Langley (30 March 1877 – 28 November 1968) was the Anglican Dean of Melbourne from 1942 to 1947.

== Family ==
The son of the first Anglican Bishop of Bendigo, Henry Archdall Langley (1840–1906), and Elizabeth Mary Langley (1842–1923), née Strachan, Langley was born in Windsor, New South Wales on 30 March 1877.

He was the sixth of Langley's 12 children. One of his brothers, Frank Langley, played Australian rules football for the Melbourne Football Club in the Victorian Football League (VFL) from 1900 to 1906; another was the Archdeacon of St Andrew's Cathedral, Sydney; and four of his sisters were involved with St Catherine's School, Toorak, two serving as its principal.

He married Ethel Maud Du Ve (1878–1957), fourth daughter of Charles Ignatz Du Ve (1836–1915), and Agnes Adamson Du Ve (1845–1915), née Buntine, on 4 September 1901. They had four sons, and one daughter:

- Henry Archdall "Hal" Langley (1902–1965).
- Charles Ethelbert Langley (1904–1981), who taught at Hale School in Western Australia from 1930 to 1933, and then at Melbourne's Caulfield Grammar School from 1934 to 1960.
- Philip D'acres Langley (1907–2000).
- Thomas Laurence Langley (1911-).
- Ethel Grace Archdall Langley (1915-).

== Education ==
Along with four of his five brothers, he attended Caulfield Grammar School in the 1890s.

An excellent scholar, he was awarded a theological studentship in 1893 (for 1894), in 1894 (for 1895), and in 1895 (for 1896). He began his studies at Trinity College, Melbourne in 1894, graduating Bachelor of Arts (B.A.) in 1899, and Master of Arts (M.A.) in 1904, with final honours in logic and philosophy.

== Cleric ==
He was ordained in 1901.

After curacies served at St Paul's Church, Sale, St. Mary's Church, Morwell, Holy Trinity Church, Yarram, St. Clement's Church, Marrickville, and St Philip's Church, Sydney, he became the rector of St James' Church, Traralgon in 1907.

He then served as the incumbent at St Mary's Anglican Church (now known as Oaktree Anglican Church) in Caulfield, Victoria, as "Canon Langley", from 1911 to 1942.

=== Caulfield Grammar School ===
While at St. Mary's he served as Caulfield Grammar School's chaplain.

In 1931, the school (at the time owned by Walter Murray Buntine) ceased being a "private school", and it became a "public school", with its operation conducted by a private company limited by guarantee. Langley served on the Caulfield Grammar School Council (the company's governing body) from its foundation in 1931 until 1945.

=== Military chaplain ===
On 1 January 1916, Langley was appointed as a military chaplain to the First AIF.

=== Shelford Girls' Grammar School ===
As the Vicar of St Mary's, Langley had been giving the pupils of Shelford Girls' School weekly lessons in religious instruction for several years.

The school, established in 1898 (in Glen Eira Road) by Emily Dixon, was relocated to 77 Allison Road, Elsternwick by its second principal, Dora Mary Petrie Blundell (1865–1943), who served as the school's second principal from 1904 to 1921.

Dora was assisted and supported by her sisters, Lucy Annie Blundell (1850–1922), Fanny Blundell (1851–1937) and Margaret Helen Petrie Blundell (1866–1953), in performing her wide range of duties.

In 1923, Langley was responsible for the relocation of the school from 77 Allison Road, Elsternwick to "Helenslea" in Hood Crescent, Caulfield North — adjacent to St Mary's Church — the re-establishment of it as the Shelford Girls' Grammar School, and the appointment of Miss Ada Mary Thomas as its head mistress. Miss Thomas went on to serve as the school's headmistress from 1922 to 1945.

=== St. Margaret's, Caulfield ===
As Vicar of St. Mary's, he was also responsible for the foundation of St. Margaret's Anglican Church, in Ripley Grove, Caulfield, in 1923. St. Margaret's operated as "chapel of ease" to St. Mary's church. Its adjacent hall was also the home of the 2nd. Caulfield Scout Troop.

=== Dean of Melbourne ===
In August 1942, Langley was elected Dean of Melbourne — replacing Archbishop Head who had acted as dean since the retirement of George Aickin in 1932 — and continued in that position until he retired in April 1947.

=== Political views ===
According to Hansen (2000), Langley "associated himself with socialist movements and marched annually in the May Day procession". Over his lifetime, he was quite outspoken on a wide range of political and social issues:

"Dean Langley has created a place of respect and affection in the life of Melbourne by his fearless and creative utterances in the Cathedral and on the Yarra bank as to the implications of the Christian Gospel to the social order as well as the life of individuals" — Williamstown Chronicle, 5 September 1947.

== Death ==
He died on 28 November 1968, at Hawthorn, and was cremated.

== See also ==
- List of Caulfield Grammar School people

== Footnotes ==
Religious titles
Preceded by Frederick Waldegrave Head	Dean of Melbourne; 1942–1947	Succeeded by Alfred Roscoe Wilson
