= David Bowden =

Anglican Bishop of Bendigo, 1995–2002

Raymond David Bowden (31 July 1937 – 29 July 2004) was an Australian Anglican bishop, the eighth Bishop of Bendigo from 1995 to 2002.

Bowden was born in England, educated at Newcastle Boys' High School, trained for ordination at St John's College, Morpeth, and ordained deacon in 1960 and priest in 1961. He began his ordained ministry with curacies in Armidale and West Tamworth. He was the incumbent at Warialda, Savona (New York, United States), Berkeley (California), Glen Innes and Terrigal. He was Archdeacon of the Central Coast from 1985 to 1992; and of Newcastle until his ordination to the episcopate on 6 December 1995.

Church of England titles
Preceded by Benjamen Wright	Bishop of Bendigo; 1995–2002	Succeeded by Andrew William Curnow
