= Wilfred Dau =

Wilfred Frederick Dau (1895-1969) was an Anglican priest in Australia in the mid twentieth century.

Dau was educated at the Australian College of Theology; and ordained deacon in 1921, and priest in 1922. After a curacy in Tallygaroopna he held the incumbencies at Beechworth and Shepparton . He was Dean of Bendigo from 1940 to 1951. During his time at the deanery he also served as a Chaplain in the AIF.
