= Oliver Heyward =

Bishop of Bendigo

Oliver Spencer Heyward (16 March 1926 – 15 December 2003) was an Australian Anglican bishop. He was the sixth Bishop of Bendigo from 1975 to 1991 and the assistant to the primate of the Anglican Church of Australia from 1991 to 1995.

Heyward was born in Launceston, Tasmania, and educated at Launceston Church Grammar School. He was in the RAAF from 1944 to 1946. He had four children, Mark, James, Peter and Nicholas, with his wife Peggy (nee Butcher). when he entered the University of Tasmania. In 1949 he won a Rhodes Scholarship to study at Oriel College, Oxford. He was ordained after studying at Ripon College Cuddesdon in 1954 and began his ordained ministry as a curate at St Peter's Brighton, England. Returning to Tasmania he held incumbencies in Sorrell and Richmond. After this he was precentor at St David's Cathedral, Hobart, then warden of Christ College, University of Tasmania until his ordination to the episcopate at St Paul's Cathedral, Melbourne on 1 February 1975.

Church of England titles
Preceded by Ronald Edwin Richards	Bishop of Bendigo; 1975– 1991	Succeeded by Benjamen Wright
