= Donald Haultain =

Twentieth century Anglican priest

Donald Haultain was an Anglican priest in the first half of the twentieth century.

Haultain was educated at Moore Theological College; and ordained deacon in 1914, and priest in 1915. After a curacy at Wahroonga he was Rector of Sale, Victoria. He was Vicar of Kyneton from 1924 to 1928; Dean of Bendigo from 1928 until 1932; Vicar of All Saints, Nelson from 1932 to 1939; and Archdeacon of Marlborough from 1940 to 1948.
