= Charles Hulley =

Australian Anglican priest

Charles Frederick Hulley (Helmsley, 10 March 1892 – Burwood, 26 October 1962) was an Australian Anglican priest.

Hulley was educated at St John's College, Armidale; and ordained deacon in 1919 and priest in 1922. After a curacy at Quirindi he held incumbencies at Emmaville, Moree and Haberfield. He was Dean of Bendigo from 1952 to 1956; and Incumbent at Strathfield from 1956 to 1962.

His only son, Charles Hulley (1928–2009), was a senior executive with Coca-Cola.
