= Lola Graham =

Australian pianist

Lola Glenn Graham (23 September 1918 – 2 January 1992) was an Australian pianist. She first came to public attention after winning a musical competition at age six by playing the piano. She attended Shelford Church of England Girls' Grammar School and passed her music examinations in December 1933. In October 1936 her piano teacher, Sheila MacFie, organised a recital for Graham and fellow student, Eda Ashton, at the British Music Society's rooms, Melbourne. In April 1942 Graham and Ashton were pianists for a radio broadcast on 3LO on the Australian Broadcasting Commission's network. In May of the following year her chamber music piano work was described by The Argus' reporter, "Graham showed virtuosity in her playing of Albanesi's Sonata in C Major."

She worked in radio for most of her career. In October 1946 she performed a duo piano recital with Mamie Reid on national radio. She worked in live musical theatre both as a band member and accompanist. Graham married Fred Menhennitt on 23 February 1957 and the couple had two sons. She was a backing musician for Barry Humphries, and in 1962, she provided piano on his album, A Nice Night's Entertainment. She died, aged 73, after being diagnosed with cancer.
