= Church by the Bridge =

The Bridge Church (Kirribilli)
- St John the Baptist, Kirribilli
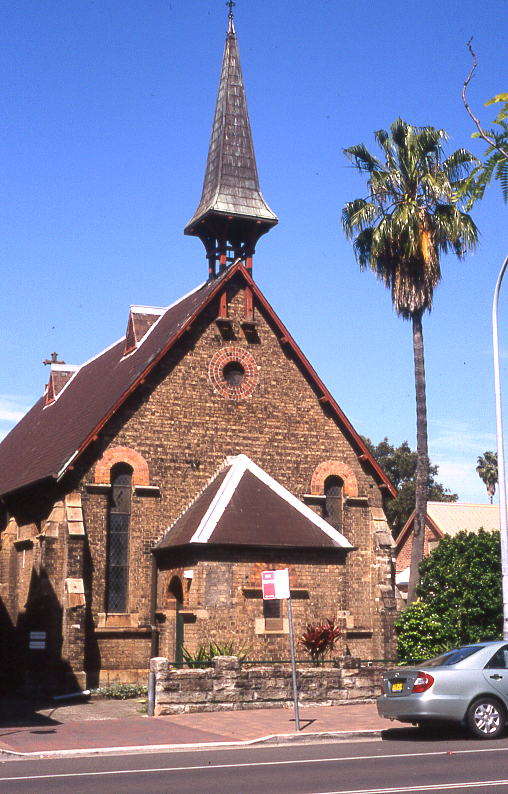
- St John the Baptist Church, Kirribilli, pictured in 2007

- Location in greater metropolitan Sydney
- 33°50′48″S 151°12′47″E
- Location: 7-9 Broughton Street, Kirribilli
- Country: Australia
- Denomination: Anglican
- Churchmanship: Evangelical
- Website: cbtb.org.au

History
- Status: Church
- Dedication: Saint John the Baptist

Architecture
- Functional status: Active
- Architect: Edmund Blacket
- Architectural type: Church
- Style: Romanesque Revival
- Years built: 1884–1909

Administration
- Diocese: Sydney
- Parish: Kirribill

New South Wales Heritage Database (Local Government Register)
- Official name: St John The Baptist Anglican Church
- Type: Local government heritage
- Designated: 2 August 2013
- Reference no.: Local government
- Type: Church
- Category: Religion

The Bridge Church (Kirribilli) is the Kirribilli location of The Bridge Church, meeting at an Anglican church at 7–9 Broughton Street, Kirribilli, on the Lower North Shore of Sydney, New South Wales, Australia. The Bridge Church (Kirribilli) meets in St John the Baptist Church and is part of 'The Bridge Church', which encompasses 3 locations, being Kirribilli, Neutral Bay and Macquarie Park.

As at January 2022, the Bridge Church congregation consists of around 1,250 people, (approximately 1,000 adults and 250 children) from a wide variety of backgrounds, married, single and young families.

== History ==
The Church of St John the Baptist was founded in 1884 within the Parish of Christ Church, Lavender Bay. It subsequently became a parish in 1902. The population of Milsons Point declined following commercial development of the area in the 1970s.

In 1983 a Chinese/Cantonese speaking congregation based in the Cathedral decided to join the congregation of St John's. The finances improved and arrears of assessments were paid.

The church was amalgamated with the Parish of Neutral Bay (St Augustine's) on 1 December 1989, and together they went by the name St John the Baptist Kirribilli. The size of the Chinese congregation grew sufficiently to regain the church's status as an independent provisional parish. In 1993 the congregation comprises approximately 10% local European residents and 90% Chinese from many parts of the Diocese.

In 2007 the Chinese (Cantonese) congregation moved to Artarmon. Bishop Glenn Davies invited Paul Dale to consider becoming curate in charge of St John's.

In March 2011 a new evening congregation was planted at Christ Church, Lavender Bay and in 2016 this congregation moved to St Peter's Presbyterian Church Hall at McMahons Point.

On Sunday 6 February 2005, a new evening service was started, called '6 for 6.15pm' with 42 people gathering to worship God. This was a church plant of St Thomas' Anglican Church, North Sydney. This was the beginning of 'The Bridge Church', or as it was then known, 'Church by the Bridge'.

In 2020, The Bridge Church and St Augustine, Neutral Bay were merged to form one parish.

The Bridge Church now meets across three locations, being Kirribilli, Neutral Bay and Macquarie Park. In The Bridge Church building at Kirribilli, these gatherings take place at 8am, 10am, 5pm and 7pm. At the St Augustine's Neutral Bay site, these gatherings take place at 8am, 10am, 4pm and 6pm. At Macquarie Park, in the Trinity Chapel, these gatherings take place at 10:30am and 5:30pm.

== Buildings ==
St John the Baptist, Kirribilli was designed by Edmund Blacket as a church school, in the Romanesque Revival style, and built in 1884. A vestry and sanctuary were added in 1900. The nearby kindergarten was built as a church hall in 1909. The church was listed on the North Sydney Council local government heritage register on 2 August 2013.

== Ministry ==
The church runs "Carols Under The Bridge", located in Bradfield Park under the northern end of Sydney Harbour Bridge.

== See also ==
- List of Anglican churches in the Diocese of Sydney
