= Ben Wright (bishop) =

Bishop of Bendigo

Benjamen "Ben" Wright (15 March 1942 – 22 January 2010) was an Australian Anglican bishop who was the Bishop of Bendigo from 1992 to 1993.

Wright was educated at Slade School, Warwick, Queensland and Murdoch University, Perth. He was ordained in 1965. After a curacy at Applecross he held incumbencies at Narembeen, Alice Springs and Scarborough. He was Archdeacon of Stirling, then of the Goldfields and finally of O’Connor before his ordination to the episcopate.

Church of England titles
Preceded by Oliver Spencer Heyward	Bishop of Bendigo; 1992–1993	Succeeded by Andrew William Curnow
