= Matthew Langley =

American painter

Matthew Langley is a New York City painter and photographer whose work has focuses on space, compression, volume and sentience (painting) and Vanishing American DIY culture (photography). This photographic series is titled Vanishing Culture USA.

The painting work with structures are a visual system exploring ideas within a framework that allows a departure point for further exploration. This departure - from strict formal codes allows an informal precision that can highlight the variety, complexity and questioning nature of painting as well as offer a further approach to reductive image making. This open ended approach is core to the images created and allows them to be handled with the same approach - a non-specific exactness.

Matthew Langley's works are somewhat influenced by Reductive Minimalism in terms of stripping art to its bare fundamentals. Which could be traced back to Herbert Bayer who was once the Bauhaus director.

== Critical Reviews ==
The Washington City Paper wrote of Langley's work: "Matthew Langley gets points for audacity. His paintings draw easy comparisons to a host of latter-day abstract-expressionist titans, from Agnes Martin and Sean Scully. Make no mistake, Langley courts those comparisons—his emphasis on the grid places him squarely within that Lacanian camp that finds the sublime through repetition, variation, and trauma. It’s a dangerous proposition—Langley risks being derivative—yet in several respects his work proves to be more recidivist than redux. Soft Front, a piece featuring acrylic-painted paper tiles arranged in a loose grid, is visceral and distressing, a more sensational piece than the quiet and contemplative works it recalls. Much of the grid looks like bloody stool, with red base showing through tan overcoat; three white squares at the bottom are smeared like blood-spattered pillowcases. Color is not the only subtle violent touch in the mix. Stylus, an oil painting on canvas that also mines the grid, depicts three black squares on a yellow-and-grey background, the barest imaginable composition suggesting the object from the work’s title. Less literally, the composition is that of a sharp, black shape interrupting a harmonious horizon. Complementing the Tetris-like rigidity of Langley’s planes is a brushstroke that is anything but rigid. Neither smooth nor especially flourishy, the artist’s brushstroke is distinguished by abrupt transitions and broken parapets. In places, it resembles encaustic. His approach to the canvas and the genre of work he’s decided on suggests that the ocean that lies beneath is not necessarily a calm body of water."

The Washington Post's art critic Mark Jenkins described Langley's paintings as "handsome abstractions..."

Lauren LaRocca noted that Langley's work "creates space for reflection and stillness through his large-scale grid paintings."

== Exhibitions ==
Langley has shown and is collected in North America and Europe. A native of Northern Virginia, He has Studied at Virginia Commonwealth University and graduated from the Corcoran School of Art in Washington DC. Langley's artworks are usually oil on canvas, while the photographic side is shot almost exclusively with toy cameras.

ONE AND TWO PERSON EXHIBITIONS

2023 The Secret Lives of Color, KW Contemporary Art, Kennebunk, ME

2018 Blank Space, New York, NY

2017 Colors for a Large Wall, Page Bond Gallery, Richmond VA

2016 Excerpts From A Year In Painting, Art in Public Spaces, Context Art Miami, Miami, FL

Gravity, Susan Calloway Fine Arts, Washington, DC

2015 The New Paintings, Blank Space, New York, NY

2014 Looking In: New Paintings, Axom Gallery, Rochester, NY

2013 Place and Process, Susan Calloway Fine Arts, Washington DC

2012Atlas, Blank Space, NY, NY (PDF Catalog)

Arcades, Warm Springs Gallery, Charlottesville, VA

The Expanded Field, Delaplaine Arts Center, Frederick, MD

2011 Atmospheres & Imaginary Soundtracks, Susan Calloway Fine Arts, Washington DC

2010 Matthew Langley / Heejo Kim, Blank Space, New York, NY

Color Autonomy, University of Maryland University College, Curated by Robert Donovan

Angel Dust : Matthew Langley + Douglas Witmer, No Future Projects, Dayton Ohio

2009 Simple, Difficult., University of Baltimore, Baltimore MD

2008 Paintings + Paperworks, DCAC (District of Columbia Arts Center), Washington DC, Curator: J.W. Mahoney

New Paperworks, Green Line Projects, Philadelphia PA, Curator: Douglas Witmer

1995 New Paintings, Kramerbooks, Washington DC

1994 New Paperworks, GO! Gallery, Arlington VA

1993 Channel Surfing and Blueprints (Drawings, 1993), GO! Gallery, Arlington VA

== Public and Corporate Art Collections ==
- US State Department; Art In Embassies Program
- Saks Fifth Avenue
- Montefiore Hospital
- NYU Langone Health
- Cafritz Foundation
- Ernst and Young
- MacAndrews & Forbes
- DC Commission for the Art and Humanities
- PNC Bank
- The Doris Patz Collection (University of Maryland)
- University of Baltimore
- International Museum of Collage, Assemblage and Construction
- Capital One Bank
