= St Paul's Cathedral, Bendigo =

- Cathedral Church of St Paul
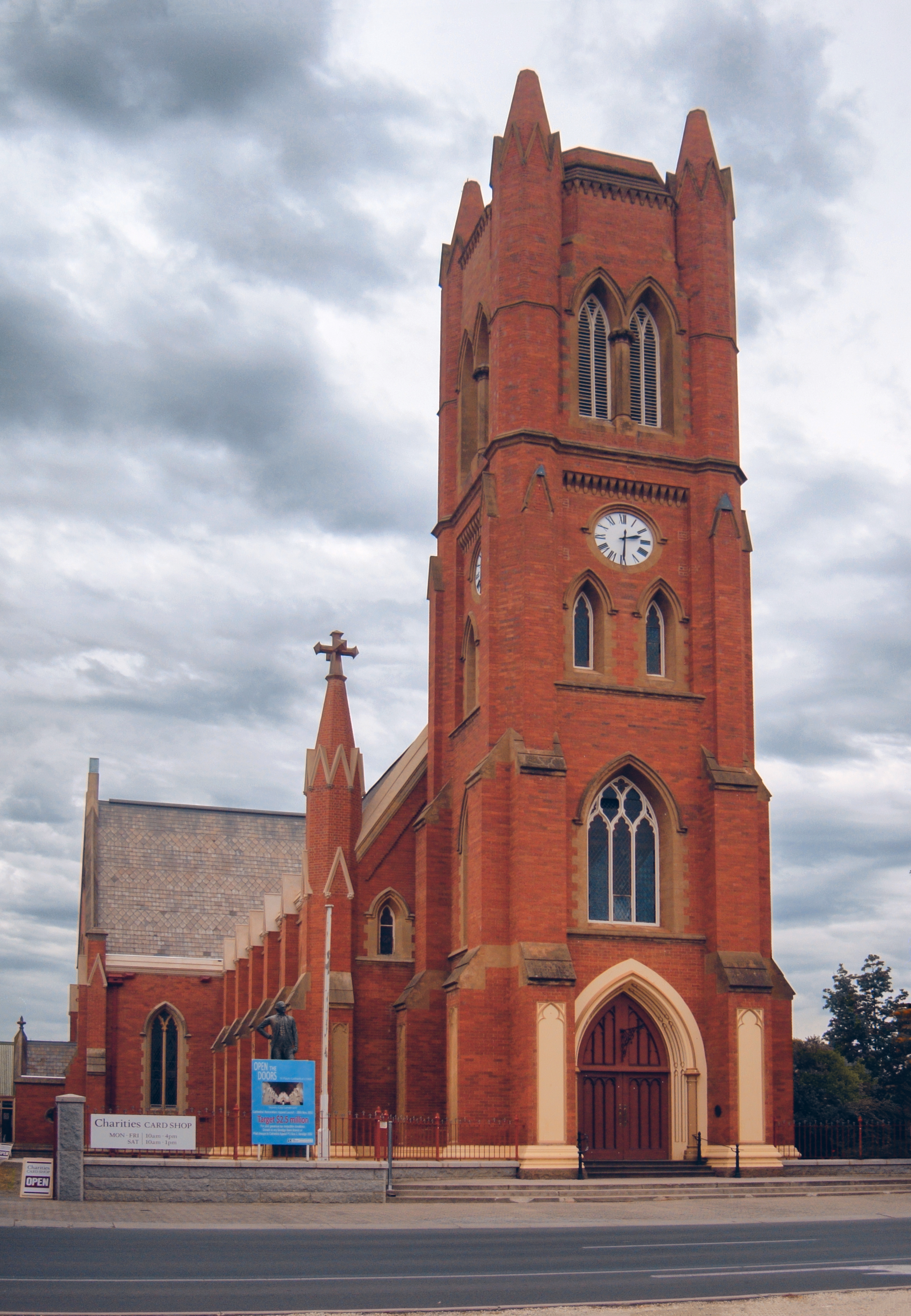
- St Paul's Cathedral, Bendigo
- St Paul's Cathedral, Bendigo
- 36°45′44″S 144°16′58″E
- Location: Bendigo
- Country: Australia
- Denomination: Anglican
- Website: stpaulsbendigo.org.au

History
- Status: Church (1868 – 1981); Cathedral (since 1981)
- Dedication: Saint Paul
- Dedicated: November 1868

Architecture
- Functional status: Complete
- Architect: Robert A. Love

Administration
- Diocese: Bendigo

Clergy
- Bishop: Matthew Brain

St Paul's Cathedral, Bendigo, is an Anglican cathedral church in Bendigo, Victoria, Australia. It is the cathedral church of the Diocese of Bendigo and the seat of the Bishop of Bendigo, presently Matthew Brain.

== History and architecture ==
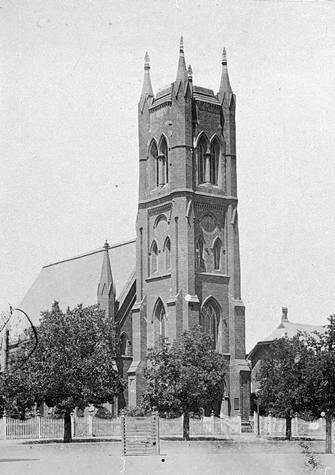
St Paul's, photographed in 1890

The building was designed by the architect Robert A. Love. The nave was dedicated in November 1868, the bell tower in 1873 and the chancel and transepts in 1927. Originally a parish church, St Paul's became the diocese's cathedral in 1981.

The building is constructed of red brick with stone dressings in an early Gothic style and is laid out in a simple cruciform plan comprising a six bay nave, transepts and sanctuary.

Internally the cathedral is decorated with stained-glass windows, several wooden sculptures and an opus sectile reflecting a high church tradition.

St Paul’s peal of eight bells was cast by Mears & Stainbank of London which arrived on the Cutty Sark. They were first rung on Good Friday, 10 April 1873. The tenor is 0.71 tonnes (14 long cwt) however it is prohibited to ring the bells due to structural problems of the building itself.

The 1883 organ, with its colourful pipes, was rebuilt in 1957 and further modified in the 1990s.

The building suffered from structural concerns for some time. From 1880 the bell tower was unstable and bells were not able to be rung but only chimed. This eventually required the bells to be reinstalled in a lower position. In 2009 the entire building was closed to the public for seven years. The cathedral was formally renewed and reopened on 5 June 2016 by the Most Revd Philip Freier.

== See also ==
- List of cathedrals in Australia
