= St Thomas' Anglican Church, North Sydney =

St Thomas' Anglican Church
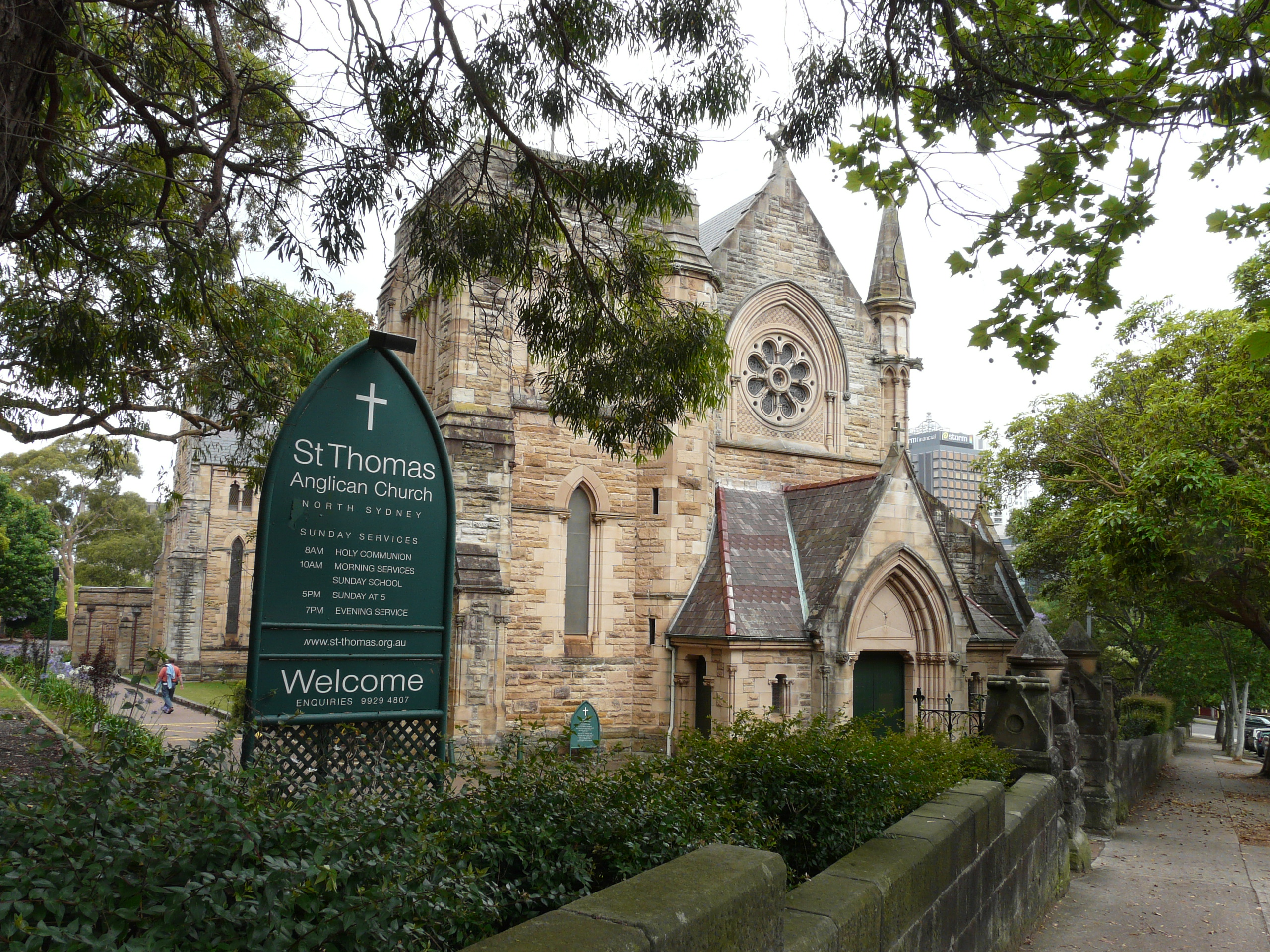
- St Thomas' Anglican Church
- 33°50′01″S 151°12′21″E
- Location: Church Street, North Sydney, New South Wales
- Country: Australia
- Denomination: Anglican Church of Australia
- Website: www.st-thomas.org.au

History
- Status: Church
- Founded: 1843
- Dedication: Thomas the Apostle
- Dedicated: 1884

Architecture
- Functional status: Active
- Architects: Conrad Martens (original church); Edmund Blacket (current church); Cyril Blacket (nave)
- Architectural type: Victorian Academic Gothic
- Years built: 1884

Administration
- Diocese: Sydney

New South Wales Heritage Database (Local Government Register)
- Official name: St Thomas' Church
- Type: Local government heritage
- Criteria: a., c., d., f., g.
- Designated: 2 August 2013
- Reference no.: I0885
- Type: Built
- Category: Church
- Builders: J. Jago

St Thomas' Anglican Church, North Sydney, is a large suburban church in the Anglican Diocese of Sydney, located in North Sydney in New South Wales, Australia. It is listed on the local government heritage register and the (now defunct) Register of the National Estate.

== History ==
Following the development of the north shore of Sydney harbour from the 1820s onwards, land was set aside for an Anglican church in North Sydney (then called St Leonards), which was designed by Conrad Martens and opened in 1846. Martens himself carved the baptismal font, which is still in use today.

As well as Martens, early members of the church included Alexander Berry, James Milson and George Barney. As well as a memorial to Barney, the church also has a stained-glass window in memory of James Graham Goodenough. Both Edward Wollstonecraft and Owen Stanley are buried in the church cemetery. A plaque commemorating the church's founders was unveiled by the Governor of New South Wales, Lord Wakehurst, in 1938.

As the population of North Sydney grew, a larger building became necessary. The cornerstone of the new Gothic Revival church, designed by Edmund Blacket, was laid in 1881 by the Prince of Wales (later George V), and construction was completed in 1886. At a length of 160 feet, it is the longest Anglican church is New South Wales. In 1904 a three-manual pipe organ, built by William Davidson of Sydney, was installed - the largest tracker organ in New South Wales at the time. It was later removed, and parts were reused in the current Norman and Beard organ installed in 1974.

On Sunday 20 October 2024, during their tour of Australia, King Charles III and Queen Camilla attended a church service at St Thomas. The sermon was preached by the Most Rev. Kanishka Raffel, Archbishop of Sydney.

The Church by the Bridge is a church plant of St Thomas.

== Rectors ==
Rectors of St Thomas have included:

- Rev. William Clarke (first rector)
- Rev. George Charles Bode (until 1880)
- Rev. Stephen Henry Childe (1880–1913)
- Rev. Horace Crotty (1913–1919)
- Rev. Harold Napier Baker (1919–1945)
- Rev. William John Siddens (1945–1970)
- Rev. Harry Edwards (1970s)
- Rev. Simon Manchester (1989−2020)
- Rev. Micky Mantle (2021−present)
