= Gary Langley =

English rugby league footballer

Gaz Langley
Personal information
- Full name: Gareth Langley
- Born: 24 October 1984 (age 41) England
- Height: 180 cm (5 ft 11 in)
- Weight: 89 kg (14 st 0 lb)

Playing information
- Position: Wing
Club
Years	Team	Pld	T	G	FG	P
2006	St. Helens	1	1	3	0	10
2006	Oldham
	Total	1	1	3	0	10

Gareth (Gary) "Gaz"/"Gazza"/"Lang" Langley (born 24 October 1984) is an English former professional rugby league footballer who played for the Salford City Reds and St. Helens in the Super League before moving on to Oldham. He was by preference a wing, and could kick goals. He made one first-grade appearance in St Helens' 26-22 defeat away to the Catalans Dragons in the 2006 Super League XI, a game in which Saints rested several of their regular first-team squad in preparation for their 2006 Challenge Cup Final with the Huddersfield Giants. In this game, he scored one try and kicked three goals. He moved to Oldham in 2006.
