= Charles Riley (bishop of Bendigo) =

Australian Anglican bishop

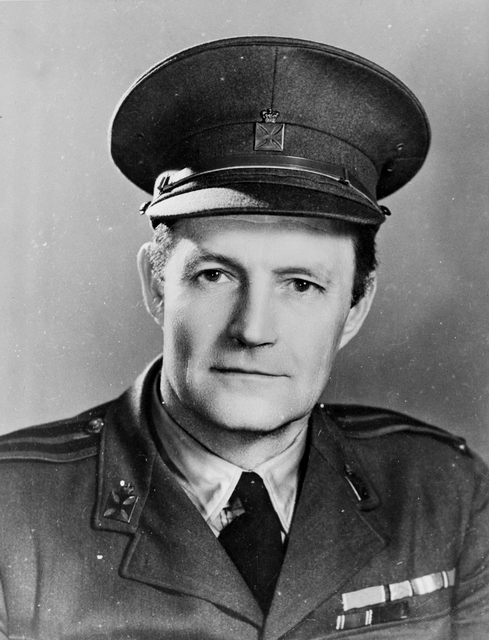
Riley c. July 1940

Charles Lawrence Riley CBE, VD (10 October 1888 – 1 April 1971) was an Australian Anglican bishop: the fourth Bishop of Bendigo from 1938 to 1957; and Chaplain-General to the AMF from 1942 until 1957.

He was born into an ecclesiastical family, the son of the Most Reverend Charles Owen Leaver Riley, Bishop of Perth from 1894 to 1914 then Archbishop until his death in 1929; and the grandson of Lawrence William Riley, sometime Vicar of St Cross Knutsford, England. He was educated at Hale School, Perth and Gonville and Caius College, Cambridge and ordained in 1914. After a curacy in Stoke on Trent he held incumbencies at St Hilda, Perth then St Mary in the same city. After these he was Archdeacon of Northam from 1930 until his ordination to the episcopate.
