= John Langley (cricketer) =

English cricketer

John Douglas Algernon Langley (25 April 1918 – 27 April 1996) was an English first-class cricketer active 1937–39 who played for Middlesex and Cambridge University. He was born in Northwood; died in Westminster.
