= R. F. Langley =

English poet and diarist

Roger Francis Langley (commonly known as R. F. Langley; 23 October 1938 – 25 January 2011) was an English poet and diarist. During his life, he was loosely affiliated with the Cambridge poetry scene.

== Life and work ==
Langley was born in Rugby, Warwickshire in 1938. He was educated in Walsall, and then at Jesus College, Cambridge, and went on to teach Art History and English Literature in secondary schools including Shire Oak Grammar School, Wolverhampton Grammar School and, later, Bishop Vesey's Grammar School in Sutton Coldfield. Publishing most of his work during the final decade of his life, Roger Langley first disseminated his poetry through small presses, periodicals, and anthologies, including The Harvill Book of Twentieth-Century Poetry in English (1999). He published two collections of poetry with Carcanet Press during his lifetime: Collected Poems (2000) and The Face of It (2007).

His first Carcanet collection was nominated for a Whitbread Book Award. Throughout his life, Langley maintained a journal, extracts from which were a regular feature in the poetry journal PN Review, and which were published in book form by Shearsman Press in 2006.

Although he lived in South Staffordshire most of his life, in the villages of Stonnall and Shenstone, the inspiration for much of Langley's work came from the landscapes of Suffolk, where he resided during the closing years of his life. His range of reference was, however, extremely broad, and was informed by close acquaintance with the art criticism of Adrian Stokes and the work of psychoanalyst Melanie Klein.

Langley was posthumously awarded the 2011 Forward Prize for Best Single Poem, for "To a Nightingale", described by the judges as "a masterclass in precision".

== Books ==
- Hem (Infernal Methods, 1978)
- Sidelong (Infernal Methods, 1981)
- Man Jack (Poetical Histories No. 30, 1993)
- Twelve Poems (Infernal Methods, 1994)
- Jack (Equipage, 1998)
- Collected Poems (Carcanet Press, 2000)
- More or Less (Many Press, 2002)
- Twine (Landfill, 2004)
- Journals (Shearsman, 2006)
- The Face of It (Carcanet Press, 2007)
