= Andrew Curnow =

Australian bishop

The Right Reverend Andrew Curnow AM
- Bishop of Bendigo
- Church: Anglican Church of Australia
- Diocese: Bendigo
- Installed: 28 June 2003
- Term ended: 2 December 2017
- Predecessor: David Bowden
- Successor: Matthew Brain

Orders
- Ordination: 1974
- Consecration: 1994

Personal details
- Born: Andrew William Curnow; 1950 (age 75–76) Bendigo, Victoria, Australia
- Denomination: Anglican
- Spouse: Jan Curnow

Andrew William Curnow AM (born 1950) is a retired bishop of the Anglican Church of Australia. He was the ninth bishop of the Anglican Diocese of Bendigo in regional Victoria from 2003 to 2017.

Curnow took degrees in commerce, divinity and arts, entering residence at Trinity College in 1968 where he was awarded the Marley Studentship in Theology. He was ordained priest in 1974 and served in the Bendigo, Melbourne and New York dioceses. In 1994 he was appointed assistant bishop in the Diocese of Melbourne, serving the northern region. He was enthroned as bishop of Bendigo on 28 June 2003 where he served until his retirement in 2017.

Curnow has lived, studied and ministered in widely diverse communities and parishes, ranging from those in rural Victoria (Elmore, Lockington), to regional centres such as Bendigo, Melbourne suburbs (West Coburg, Pascoe Vale South, Kew and Malvern) and overseas in New York and Virginia in the United States and Oxford in England. He is prominent in his concern for welfare issues (through involvement in and leadership of groups such as Anglicare Australia, St Luke's Anglicare, the Brotherhood of St Laurence and welfare services such as New Horizons Welfare Services in Kyneton, Victoria).

Curnow has had leadership roles in Christian education in the Council for Christian Education in Schools, at Braemar College and the Melbourne College of Divinity. He has a particular interest in the theology of mission in contemporary Australia on which he has written extensively. He is married to Jan Curnow.

Curnow was appointed a Member of the Order of Australia in the 2013 Australia Day Honours.
