= John Langley (bishop) =

John Douse Langley (17 May 1836 – 8 November 1930) was the second Bishop of Bendigo from 1907 to 1920.

Born in Ballyduff, County Waterford, he was educated at Trinity College, Dublin, and Moore College in New South Wales.

He came to Australia with his family in 1853 and after an earlier career with the Bank of Australasia was ordained in 1873. He held incumbencies in Berrima and Sydney before becoming Archdeacon of Cumberland in 1895 and a canon of St Andrew's Cathedral, Sydney, in 1902.

Langley succeeded his younger brother, Henry Archdall Langley (1844–1906), who was the first Bishop of Bendigo. He died on 8 November 1930.

Church of England titles
Preceded by Henry Archdall Langley	Bishop of Bendigo; 1907– 1920	Succeeded by Donald Baker
