= Ronald Richards (bishop) =

Bishop of Bendigo (1908–1994)

Ronald Edwin Richards (25 October 1908 - 18 November 1994) was an Australian Anglican bishop: the fifth Bishop of Bendigo from 1957 to 1974.

Richards was born in Ballarat and educated at Ballarat High School. In 1929 he entered the University of Melbourne studying Arts, and was a resident student at Trinity College. He was ordained in 1933. After a curacy in Rokewood he was priest in charge at Lismore. During World War II he was a chaplain in the AIF. When peace returned he was Vicar of Warrnambool then Archdeacon of Ballarat until his ordination to the episcopate.
