= Anglican Bishop of Bendigo =

Bishop of Bendigo
- Bishopric

anglican
- Coat of arms of the Diocese
- Incumbent: Matt Brain since 17 February 2018
- Style: The Right Reverend

Location
- Country: Australia
- Ecclesiastical province: Victoria

Information
- First holder: Henry Langley
- Denomination: Anglicanism
- Established: 5 March 1902
- Diocese: Bendigo
- Cathedral: St Paul's Cathedral, Bendigo

Website
- Diocese of Bendigo

The Bishop of Bendigo is the diocesan bishop of the Anglican Diocese of Bendigo, Australia.

== List of Bishops of Bendigo ==
Bishops of Bendigo
No	From	Until	Incumbent	Notes
1	1902	1906	Henry Langley	Installed and enthroned 5 March 1902.
2	1907	1920	John Langley	Previously Archdeacon of Cumberland and a Canon of St Andrew's Cathedral, Sydney
3	1920	1938	Donald Baker	
4	1938	1957	Charles Riley CBE VD	Previously Archdeacon of Northam.
5	1957	1974	Ronald Richards	Previously Archdeacon of Ballarat.
6	1975	1991	Oliver Heyward	Later assistant to the Primate of Australia.
7	1992	1993	Ben Wright	Previously Archdeacon of Stirling, then of the Goldfields and finally of O’Connor.
8	1995	2002	David Bowden	Previously Archdeacon of the Central Coast, then of Newcastle.
9	2003	2017	Andrew Curnow AM	Previously Bishop of the Northern Region, Melbourne.
10	2018	present	Matt Brain	Previously Assistant Bishop in Canberra and Goulburn. Installed 17 February 2018.
