= Donald Baker (bishop) =

Baker in the 1920s.

Donald Baker (1882 – 19 June 1968) was the Anglican Bishop of Bendigo from 1920 until 1938.

He was born in 1882 in Portsmouth and educated at Fitzwilliam College, Cambridge. After curacies in Cambridge, Sydney and Summer Hill, New South Wales he was Rector of St George's Hobart from 1913 to 1920 when he was ordained to the episcopate.

He was for 15 years principal of Ridley Theological College, retiring in early 1953.

Rev. Harold Napier Baker (c. 1877–1950), rector of St Thomas' Anglican Church, North Sydney 1919–1945, was a brother.
