= Henry Langley (bishop) =

Irish-Australian Anglican priest (1840–1906)

The Right Reverend Henry Langley
- Bishop of Bendigo
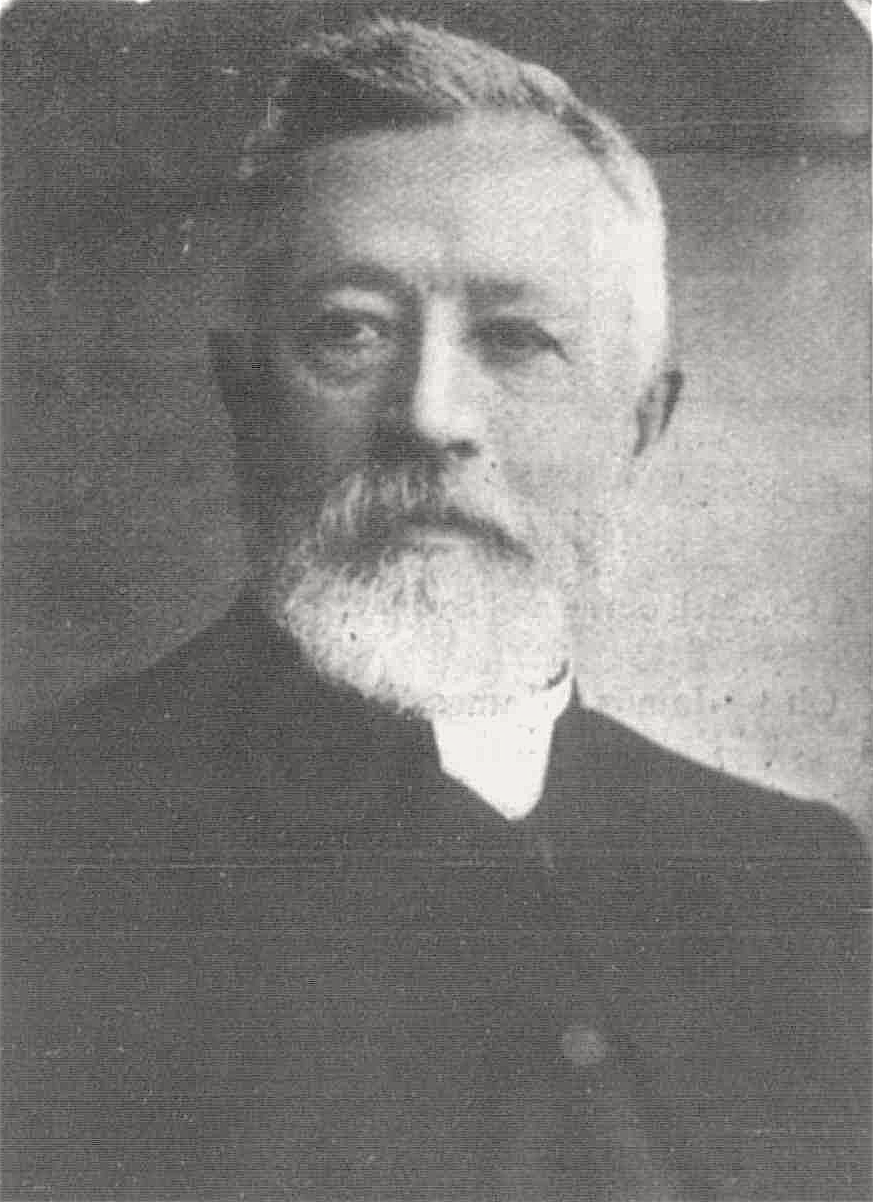
- Henry Archdall Langley, First Bishop of Bendigo
- Church: Church of England in Australia
- Diocese: Bendigo
- In office: 5 March 1902–5 August 1906
- Successor: John Langley

Orders
- Ordination: 1865 (deacon); 1866 (priest)

Personal details
- Born: Henry Archdall Langley; 15 October March 1840 Dungarvan, County Waterford, Ireland
- Died: 5 August 1906 (aged 65) Bendigo, Victoria
- Denomination: Anglican
- Parents: Henry Langley (1802-1882), Isabella Edwards Langley, née Archdall (1800-1874)
- Spouse: Elizabeth Mary Langley (1842-1923), née Strachan (m. 1867)
- Children: 6 sons, 6 daughters
- Education: Moore Theological College

Henry Archdall Langley (15 October 1840 – 5 August 1906) was an influential Irish-born Anglican priest, of considerable physical strength, who migrated to Australia in 1853, and became the first Bishop of Bendigo from 1902 until his death in 1906.

Many of his 12 children made notable contributions to Australian society in the domains of business, education, medicine; also, two of them became Anglican bishops.

== Family ==
A Strong Man.

The announcement of the death of the Right Rev. Henry Archdall Langley,
first Bishop of Bendigo, on Sunday recalls interesting stories of his career.
He was a man of fine physique, and could hold his own where display of
muscular skill was wanted.
During a Y.M.C.A. picnic some years ago in Melbourne, a crowd rushed an
excursion steamer, endangering the lives of the women and children on board.
The rev. gentleman, a strong stalwart man, seizing the situation, stood right on
the gang plank, and with his big body as a barrier, his strong, muscular arms to
aid him, and a judicious exercise of commonsense, to say nothing of his pluck
and indomitable will, he was able to keep back hundreds of men and lads,
including many roughs, from getting aboard the steamer at an awkward time.
He dared them to pass him, and he literally kept them at bay.
On another occasion, when he was connected with St. Mary's, Balmaln,
Sydney, a Sunday school picnic had proceeded somewhere down the harbour;
and a boat load of larrikins, intent on annoying the happy picnickers, attempted
to land at the spot, where the Sunday school people were enjoying themselves.
A conspicuous figure was seen ashore, standing with his coat off, armed with
a big umbrella, and threatening that if the push set their foot on the picnic ground
they would have to take the consequences. And the man who spoke was
capable of using his weapon with good effect. He succeeded in beating off the
larrikins, who, though they had numbers on their side, were not anxious to try
conclusions of a physical sort with the stalwart curate.
The curate was none other than the future Bishop of Bendigo, Bishop Langley,
who was appointed to Bendigo on the creation of the see in 1901, and who was
noted for his straightforward, earnest, evangelical views. He was an exceedingly
liberal Churchman, and connected with all philanthropic movements, irrespective
of denominational basis. He was held in esteem by all churches, and earned the
title of "The Nonconformist Bishop". At the same time he was highly respected
in the Church of England. He visited Adelaide in June, 1904, and delivered a mem-
orable address at the Y.M.C.A. silver jubilee meeting in the Exhibition Building.
His subject was appropriately entitled, "Strong men".
from The (Adelaide) Register, Tuesday 7 August 1906.

He came to Australia in 1853 when his entire family emigrated from Ireland: the economic and social consequences of the Great Famine having greatly affected both boys' formal education at Trinity College, Dublin.

=== Parents ===
Born in Dungarvan on 15 October 1840, Henry Archdall Langley was the third son of Henry Langley (1802–1882) and Isabella Edwards Langley, née Archdall (1800–1874), of Ballyduff, County Waterford, Ireland.

=== Siblings ===
He had two brothers and three sisters:

- John Douse Langley (1836–1930) who became the second Bishop of Bendigo.
- Henry Archdall Langley who predeceased Langley's birth, dying of croup aged 16 months.
- Frances Elizabeth Uzzell (1842–1920), née Langley, who married William Frederick Boulton Uzzell (1834–1885), the incumbent of St Paul's Church, Carcoar, New South Wales, in October 1867.
- Aphra Maria Isabella Glasson (1843–1925), née Hill, née Langley, who married Frederick Mellin Hill (-1870), JP in September 1864.
  Then, following Hill's death in 1870, and the death of their daughter, Catherine Isabella Hill, aged 6, in August 1871, Aphra married Richard Glasson (1837–1895) in July 1872.
- Catherine Isabella Pearse (1845–1927), née Langley, who married William Pearse (1841–1927) in March 1866.

=== Children ===
Langley had six sons and six daughters with his Australian-born wife, Elizabeth Mary Langley (1842–1923), née Strachan:

- Frederick Archdall Langley (1868–1952), a banker.
- Isabella Charlotte Alice Carrington, née Langley (1869–1941).
- Aylmer John Langley (1872–1943), a banker.
- Hilda Sarah Langley (1874–1951), principal of St Catherine's School, Toorak.
- William Leslie Langley (1875–1952), Archdeacon of St Andrew's Cathedral, Sydney.
- Henry Thomas Langley (1877–1968), Dean of Melbourne.
- Minnie Ruth Langley (1878–1933), principal of St Catherine's School, Toorak.
- Aphra Victoria Pearce, née Langley (1879–1967).
- Nona Bertha Archdall-Pearce, née Langley (1881–1964).
- Francis Ernest Langley (1882–1946): a medical practitioner who also played Australian rules football for the Melbourne Football Club in the Victorian Football League (VFL) from 1900 to 1906.
- Doris Elizabeth Langley (1884–1958).
- Arthur Theodore Langley (1886–1947), a medical practitioner.

== Education ==
Langley was educated at Moore Theological College, Sydney, under Robert Lethbridge King (1868–1878), graduating in 1865.

== Cleric ==
He was ordained deacon by Frederic Barker, Archbishop of Sydney, in 1865, and priest in 1866.

He was curate of All Saints' Church Bathurst from 1865 to 1867. He later held incumbencies at Holy Trinity Church, Orange (1867–1869), St. Mary's Church Balmain (1870–1875), St Andrew's Cathedral, Sydney (1876), St. Matthew's Church Windsor (NSW) (1877–1878), and at the newly built St. Matthew's Church Prahran in 1878.

During his time at Prahran, he was responsible for founding St. Alban's Church, Armadale, as a "chapel of ease to that parish" in 1885; and, in 1935, the Golden Anniversary memorial service was conducted by Canon H.T. Langley, "son of the founder, who as a lad was the first to ring the bell of the church".

He was Archdeacon of Gippsland from 1890 until 1894. In 1894 he became Archdeacon of Melbourne; a post he held until his ordination to the episcopate.

=== Bishop of Bendigo ===
In 1901, the Anglican ecclesiastical province of Victoria, already divided into the dioceses of Melbourne (established 1847) and Ballarat (established 1875), was further divided into three more sub-divisions — viz., that of Bendigo, Gippsland, and Wangaratta — and Langley was appointed as the first Bishop of Bendigo, serving for four and a half years from 5 March 1902 until his death on 5 August 1906.

Langley was the first Bishop of Bendigo, as well as the very first graduate from Moore Theological College to be appointed as Bishop.

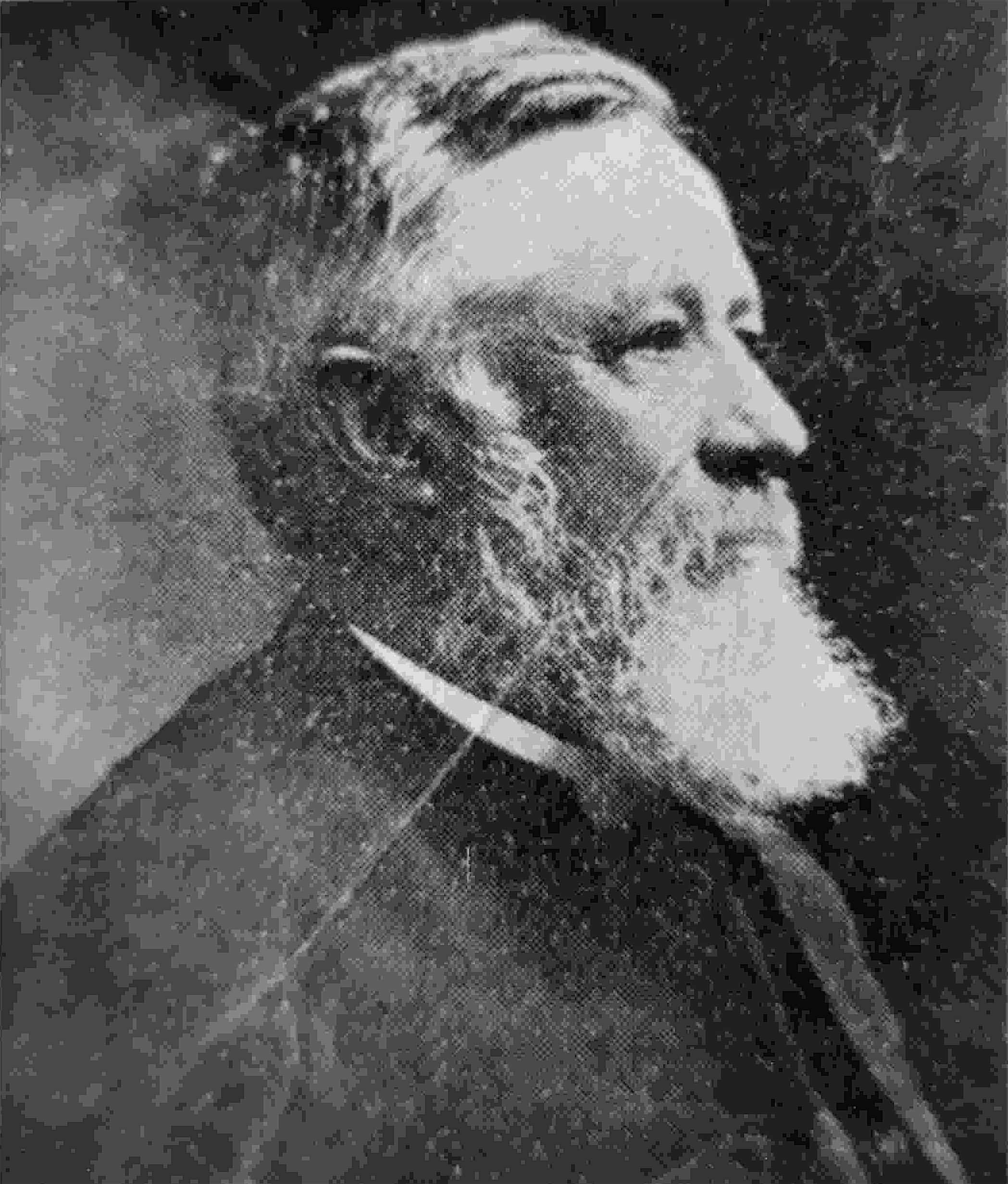
Canon Langley (1901)

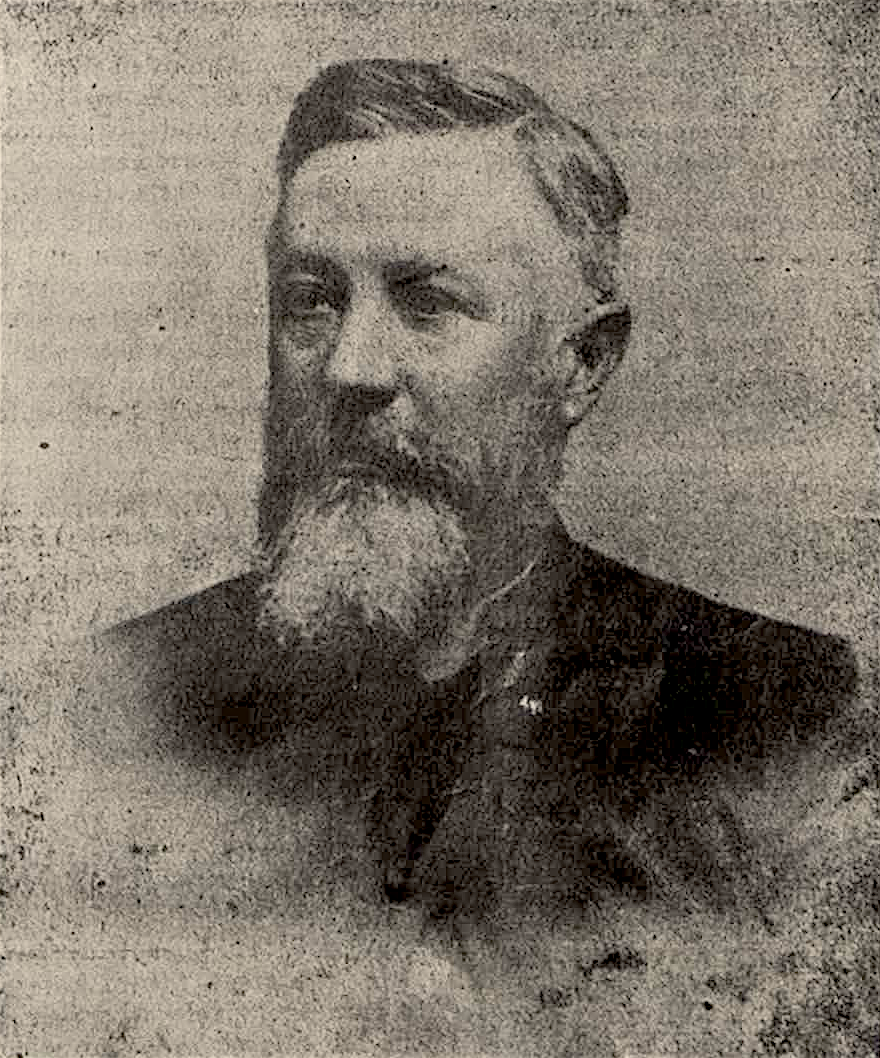
Bishop-Elect (c.1902)

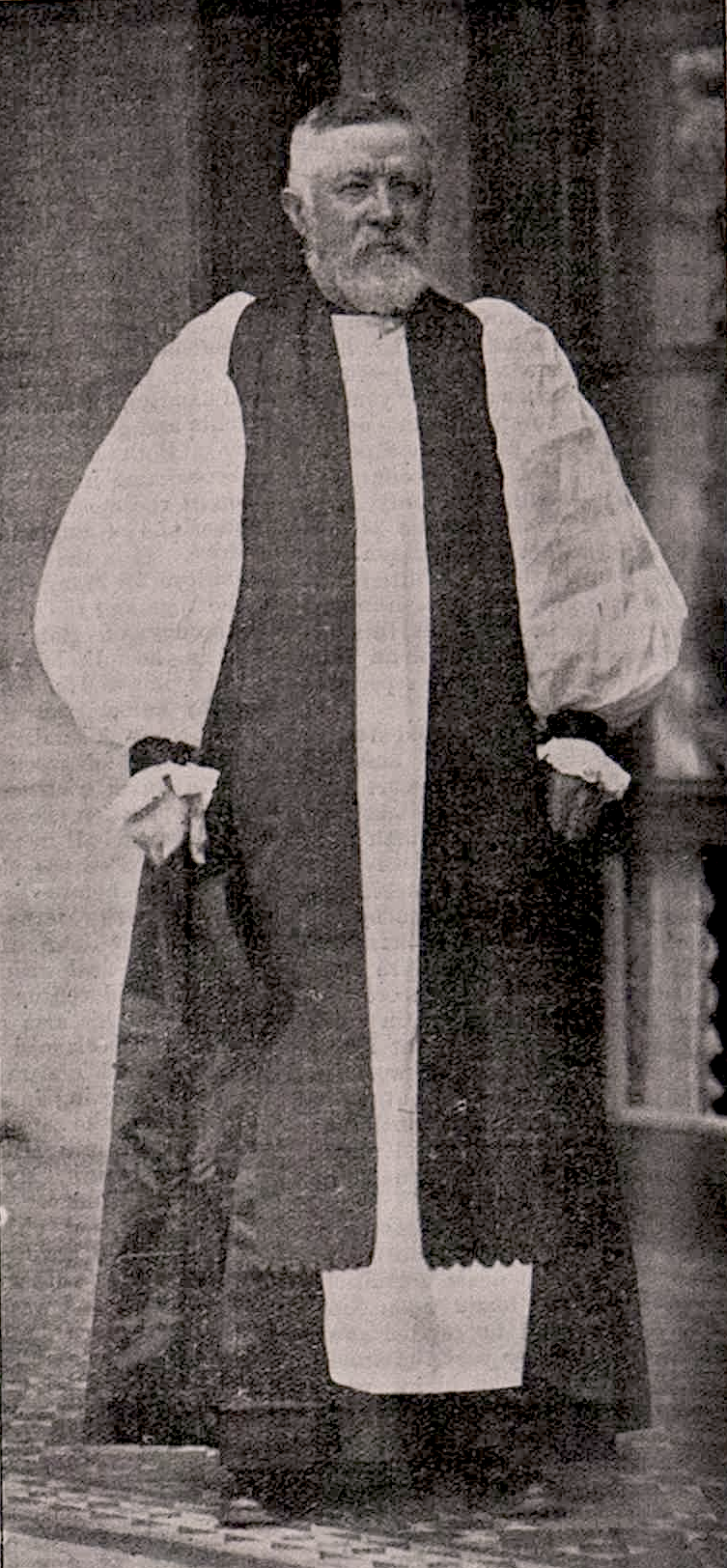
Bishop Langley (1902)

=== Bishopscourt, Bendigo ===
The "See House", situated at the corner of Napier Street and Lyons Street, White Hills, and designed by the Bendigo architects William Charles Vahland (1828–1915) and John Beebe (1866–1936), was expressly built for Langley. Generally known at the time as "Bishopscourt" — now known as "Langley Hall" — its Dedication Stone was laid in September 1904, and the Bishop and his family moved in during mid-March 1905.

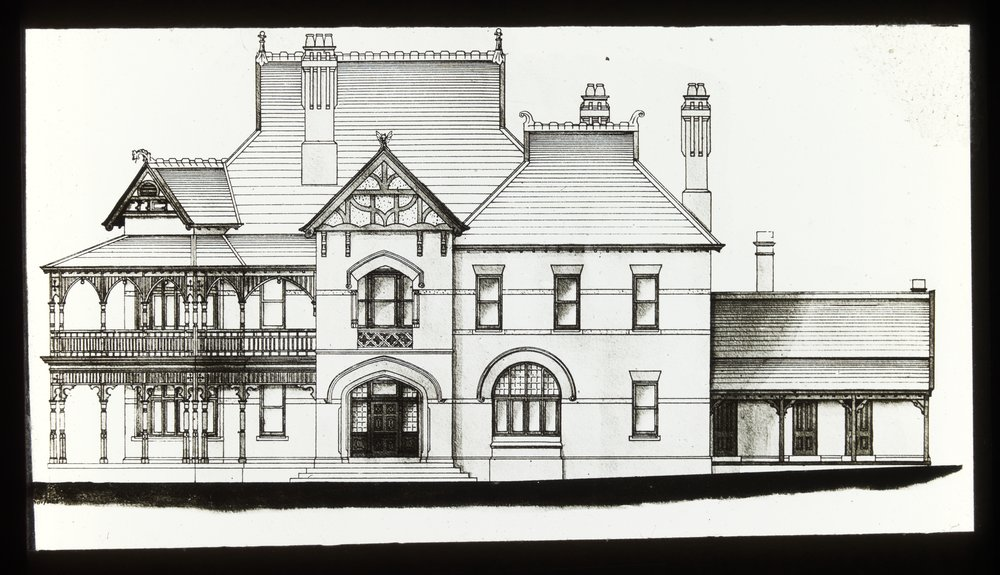
Bishopscourt (1904)

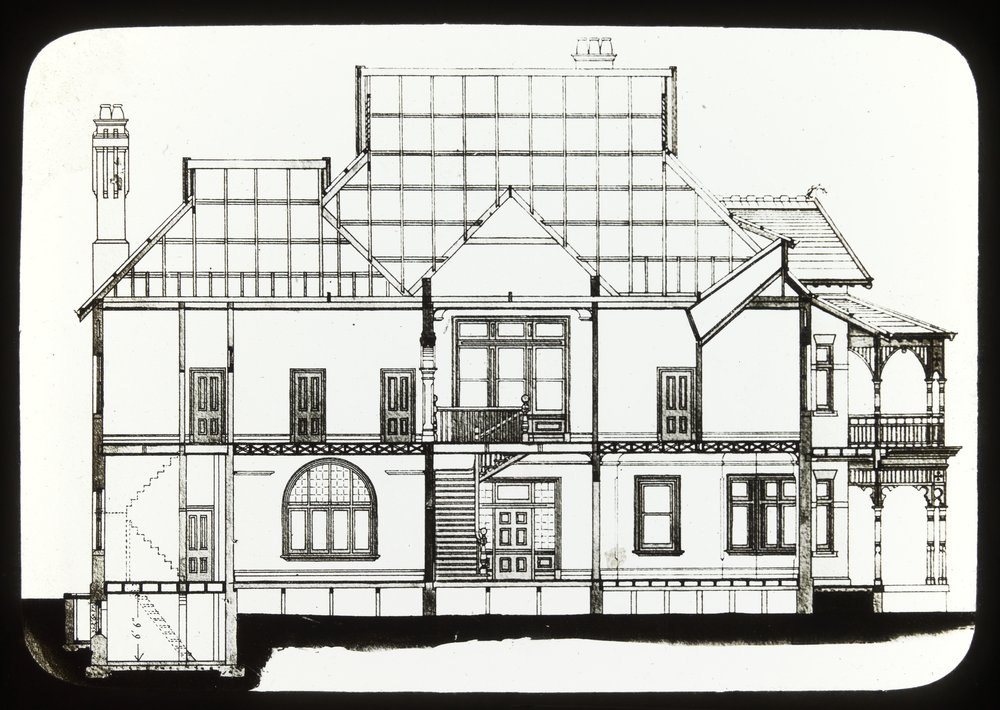
Bishopscourt (1904)

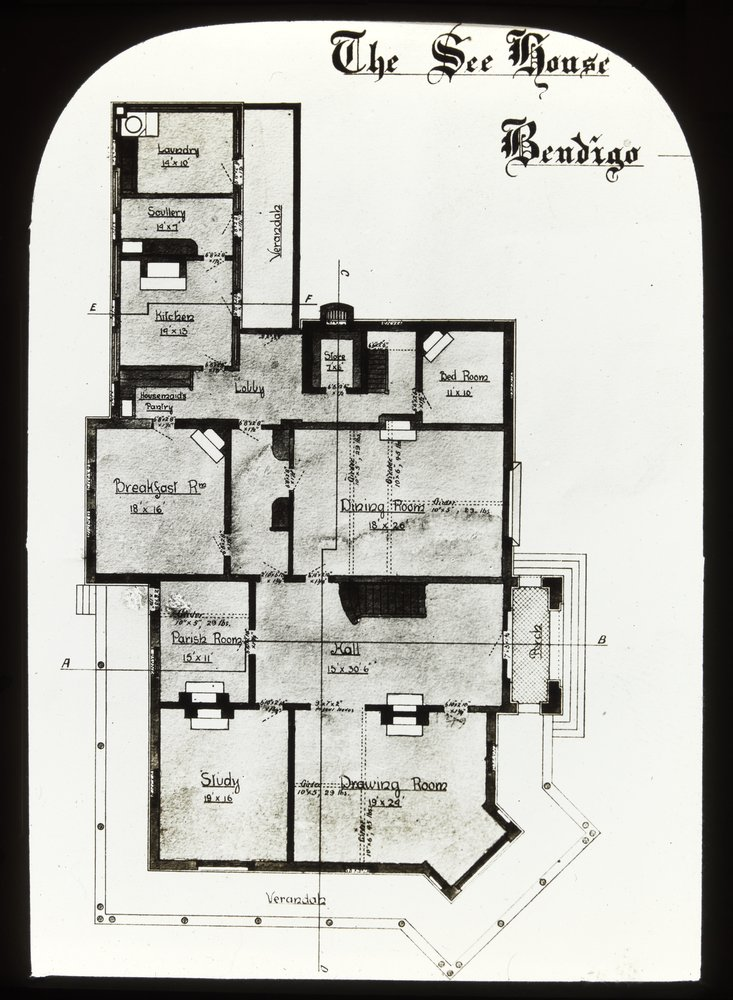
Bishopscourt (1904)

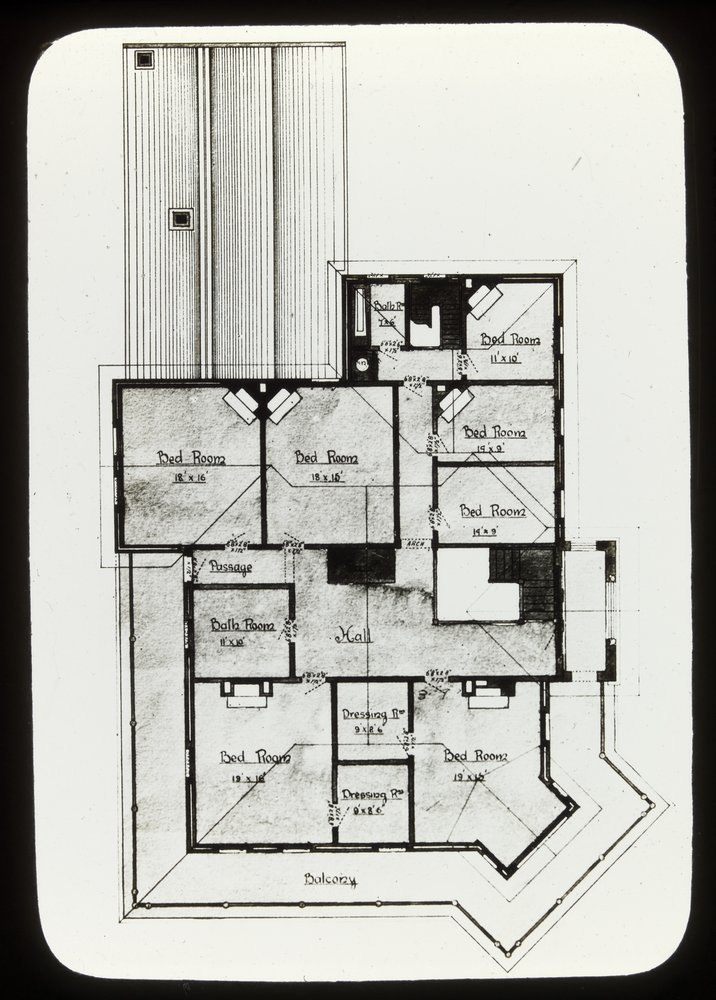
Bishopscourt (1904)

Following the resignation of Langley's brother in 1919, the bishop's residence moved from White Hills to Forest Street, beside All Saints' Cathedral, and the former Bishopscourt building was leased to the Red Cross. A convalescent home for returned soldiers suffering shell shock and other "physical" injuries was opened in the building on 3 December 1919 by Lady Helen Munro Ferguson, the wife of the Governor General, and the President (and founder) of the Australian branch of the Red Cross. It continued to function as a convalescent home until 1926. For a time Langley Hall was used for the Bendigo Theological College, associated with the Australian College of Theology, under the direction of Rev. Frederick Alfred Philbey (1887–1947).

In 1932, Langley Hall was converted into St. Luke's Toddlers' Home, run by the Mission of St James and St John, which continued to operate until 1979, when it moved to a different location, and became St. Luke's Family Care. The building, unused for a time, was completely refurbished, and has operated as bed and breakfast accommodation, as "Langley Hall", since 2000.

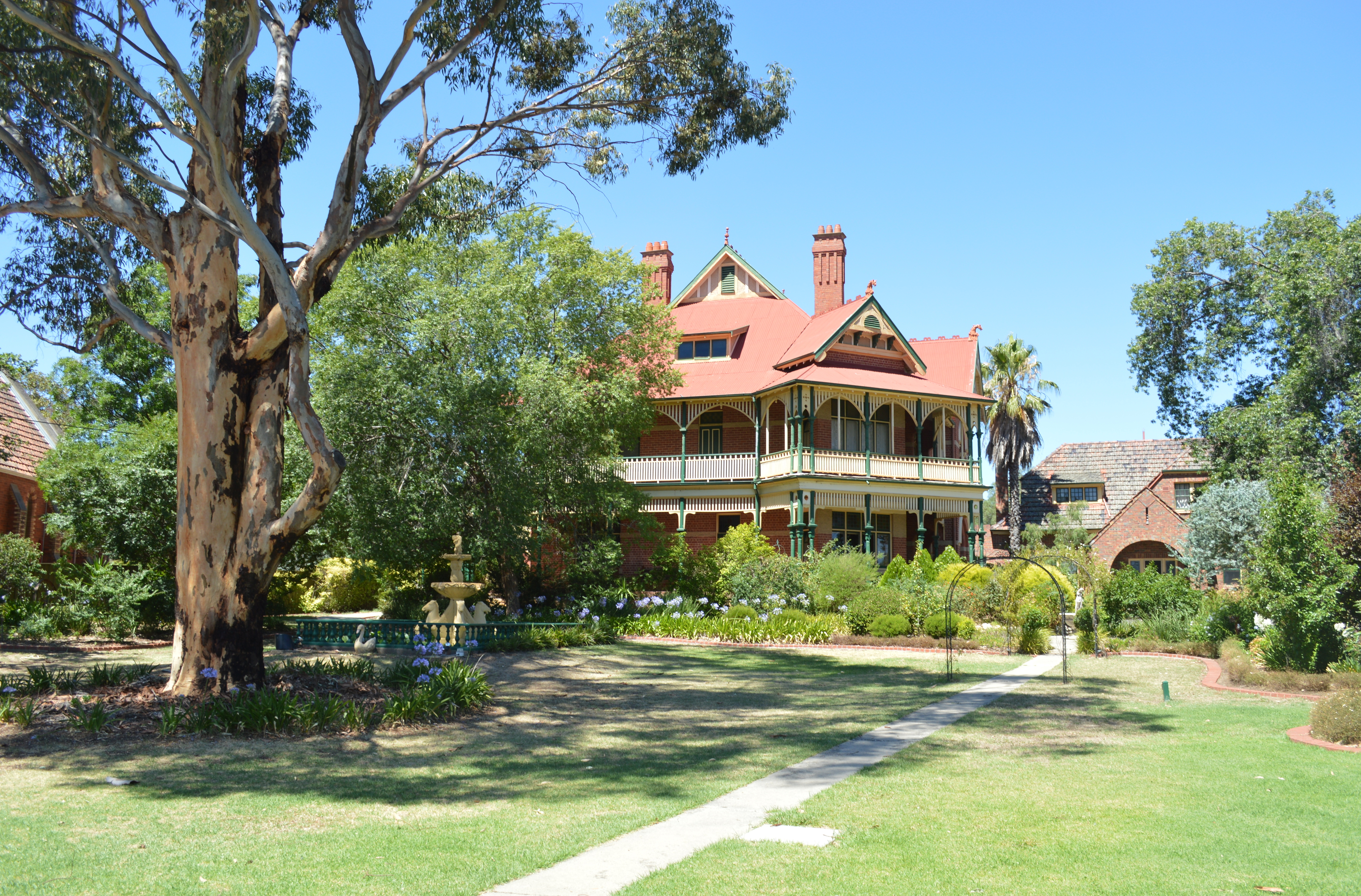
"Langley Hall" (2017)

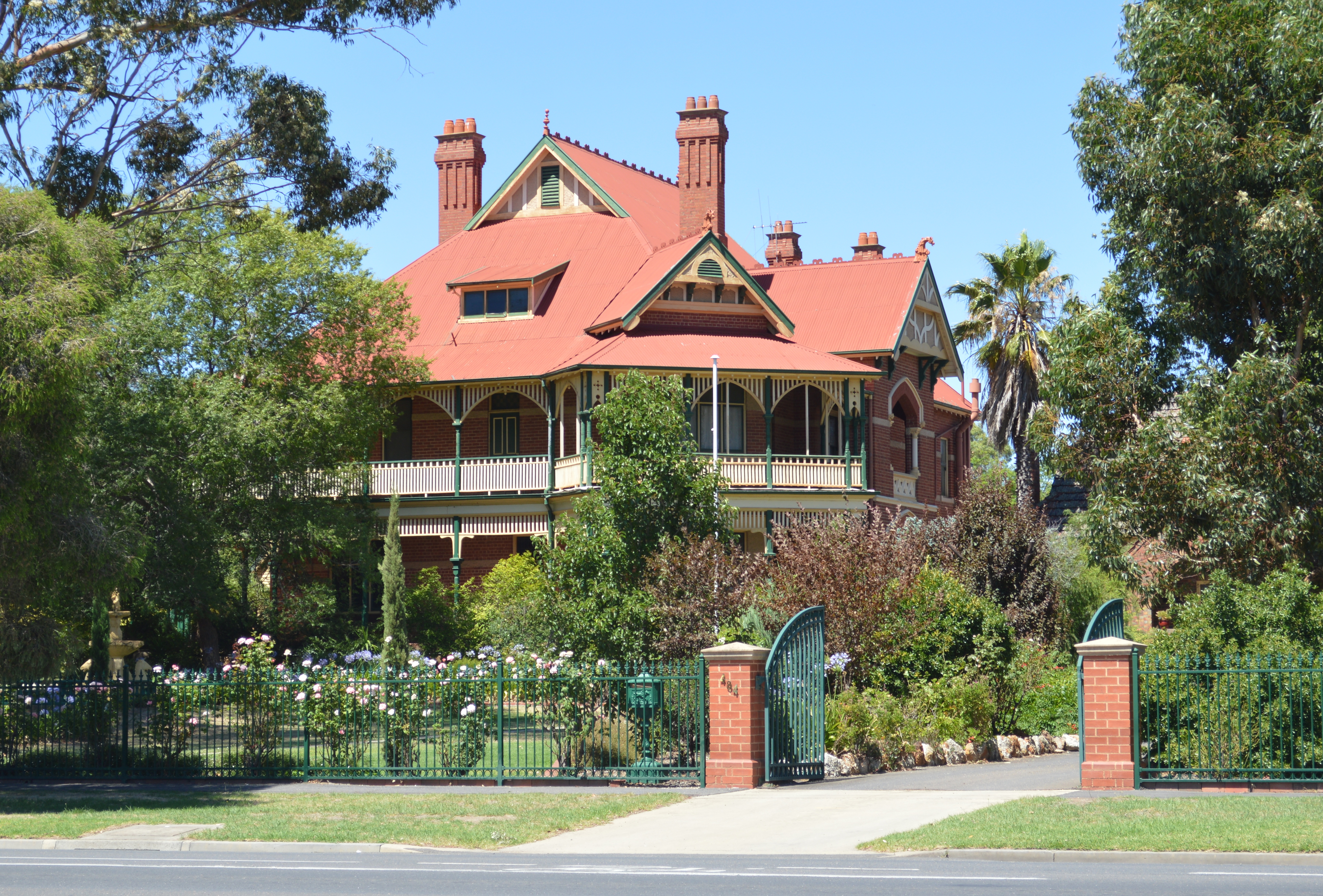
"Langley Hall" (2017)

== Death ==
The first Victorian Anglican bishop to die while still in office, he died of a cerebral haemorrhage, eleven days after collapsing at his residence.

A memorial plaque to Langley, was installed at St. Matthew's Church, Prahran; it was dedicated on 14 November 1907.

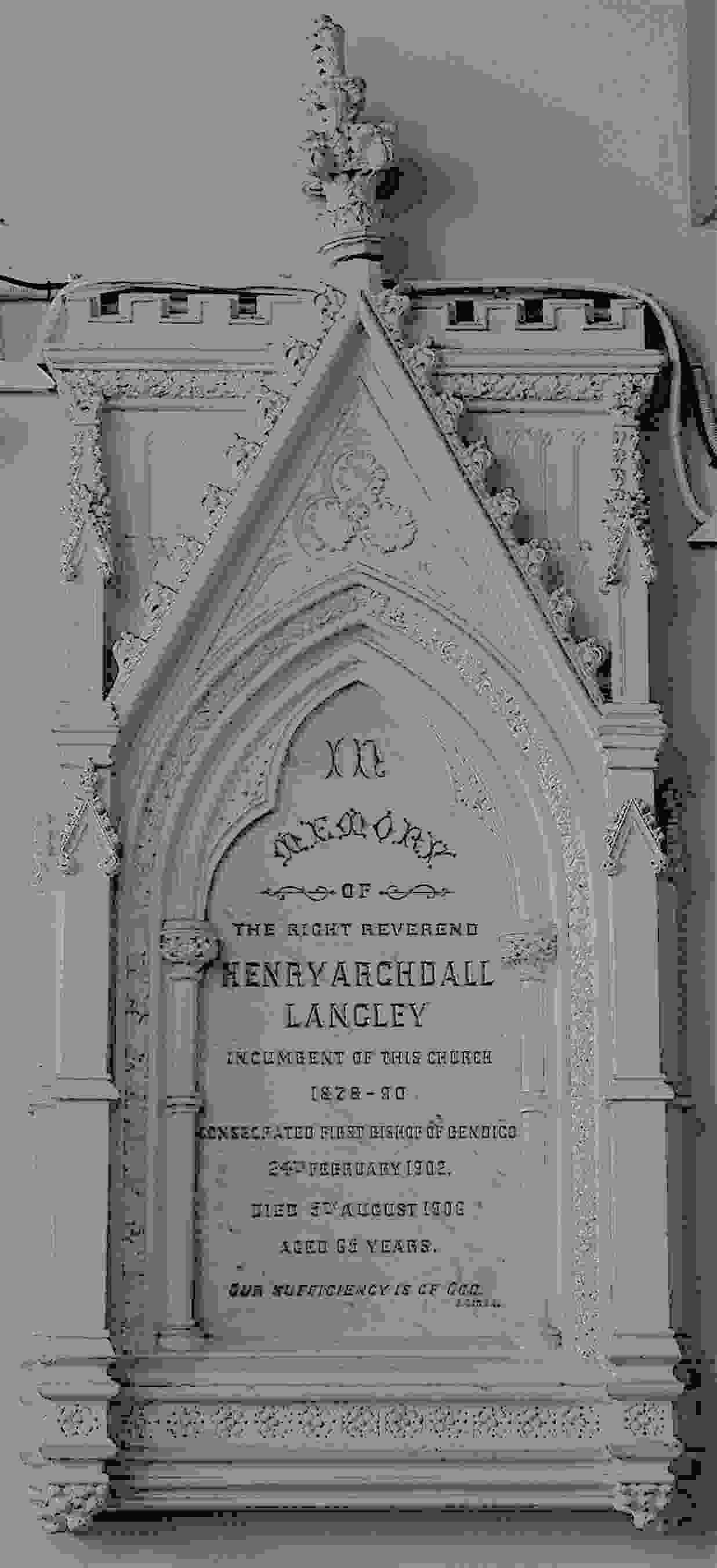
Memorial Plaque (1907)

=== Successor ===
On his death in 1906 he was succeeded as Bishop of Bendigo by his older brother Rev. Dr. John Douse Langley.

Langley's brother had not been the first choice: the diocese's intended replacement, who had been unanimously elected to the vacant see (entirely without his knowledge or permission), was the (then) Bishop of Gippsland, Arthur Wellesley Pain (1841–1920). Pain refused to leave Gippsland, and continued to serve as Bishop of Gippsland until his retirement in 1917. Langley's brother was one of four candidates: the others were Dr. William Charles Sadlier (1867–1935), later Bishop of Nelson, Canon George M'Murray, formerly of Ballarat, of St. Mary's, Auckland, and William Tucker (1856–1934), later the Dean of Ballarat.

Church of England titles
Preceded by Inaugural appointment	Bishop of Bendigo; 1902–1906	Succeeded by John Douse Langley
