= Matthew Brain =

Australian Anglican bishop

The Right Reverend Matthew Brain
- Bishop of Bendigo
- Church: Anglican Church of Australia
- Diocese: Diocese of Bendigo
- Installed: 17 February 2018
- Predecessor: Andrew Curnow
- Other posts: Assistant bishop, Diocese of Canberra and Goulburn (2015–2018)

Orders
- Ordination: 2003
- Consecration: 13 June 2015 by Glenn Davies

Personal details
- Born: 1975 or 1976 (age 50–51)
- Denomination: Anglican
- Parents: Peter Brain, Christine Brain
- Spouse: Rachael
- Children: 5

Matthew Brain is an Australian bishop of the Anglican Church of Australia. He has served as the 10th bishop of the Anglican Diocese of Bendigo in regional Victoria since February 2018. Between June 2015 and 2018 he served as an assistant bishop in the Anglican Diocese of Canberra and Goulburn.

== Early life and parish ministry ==
Brain is the son of Peter Brain, the former Bishop of Armidale in New South Wales.

He was ordained in 2003 and initially served in the Anglican Diocese of North West Australia until 2010 as diocesan youth minister and rector in Kalbarri.

In 2013, Brain moved to the Diocese of Canberra and Goulburn where he initially served as Director of Parish Support, Chaplaincy and Mission, where he has worked closely with parishes and chaplains to develop their capacity for ministry.

== Episcopal ministry ==
On 13 June 2015, Brain was consecrated as bishop by Archbishop Glenn Davies and installed as an assistant bishop in the Diocese of Goulburn and Canberra. In this position, Brain was responsible for ministry training and development in the diocese and oversaw parish support chaplaincy and mission. He also served as the rector of Arawang Anglican Church in Kambah in Canberra and as deputy chair of the board of St Marks Theological College.

In December 2017, Brain was elected as the tenth Bishop of Bendigo, succeeding Andrew Curnow who had recently retired. He was installed as Bishop of Bendigo on 17 February 2018.

As Bishop of Bendigo, Brain has called for survivors of clergy sexual abuse to have more say on redress schemes and for the Australian Government to "fix up the mess" created with asylum seekers.

== Personal life ==
Brain is married to Rachael and has five children.
