= Langley baronets =

Extinct baronetcy in the Baronetage of England

The Langley Baronetcy, of Higham Gobion in the County of Bedford, was a title in the Baronetage of England. It was created on 29 May 1641 for William Langley. The title became extinct on the death of the fifth Baronet in circa 1790.

== Langley baronets, of Higham Gobion (1641) ==
- Sir William Langley, 1st Baronet (died 1653)
- Sir Roger Langley, 2nd Baronet (c. 1627 – 1699)
- Sir Roger Langley, 3rd Baronet (died 1721)
- Sir Thomas Langley, 4th Baronet (died 1762)
- Sir Haldanby Langley, 5th Baronet (died c. 1790)
