= Holy Trinity Anglican Church, Roebourne =

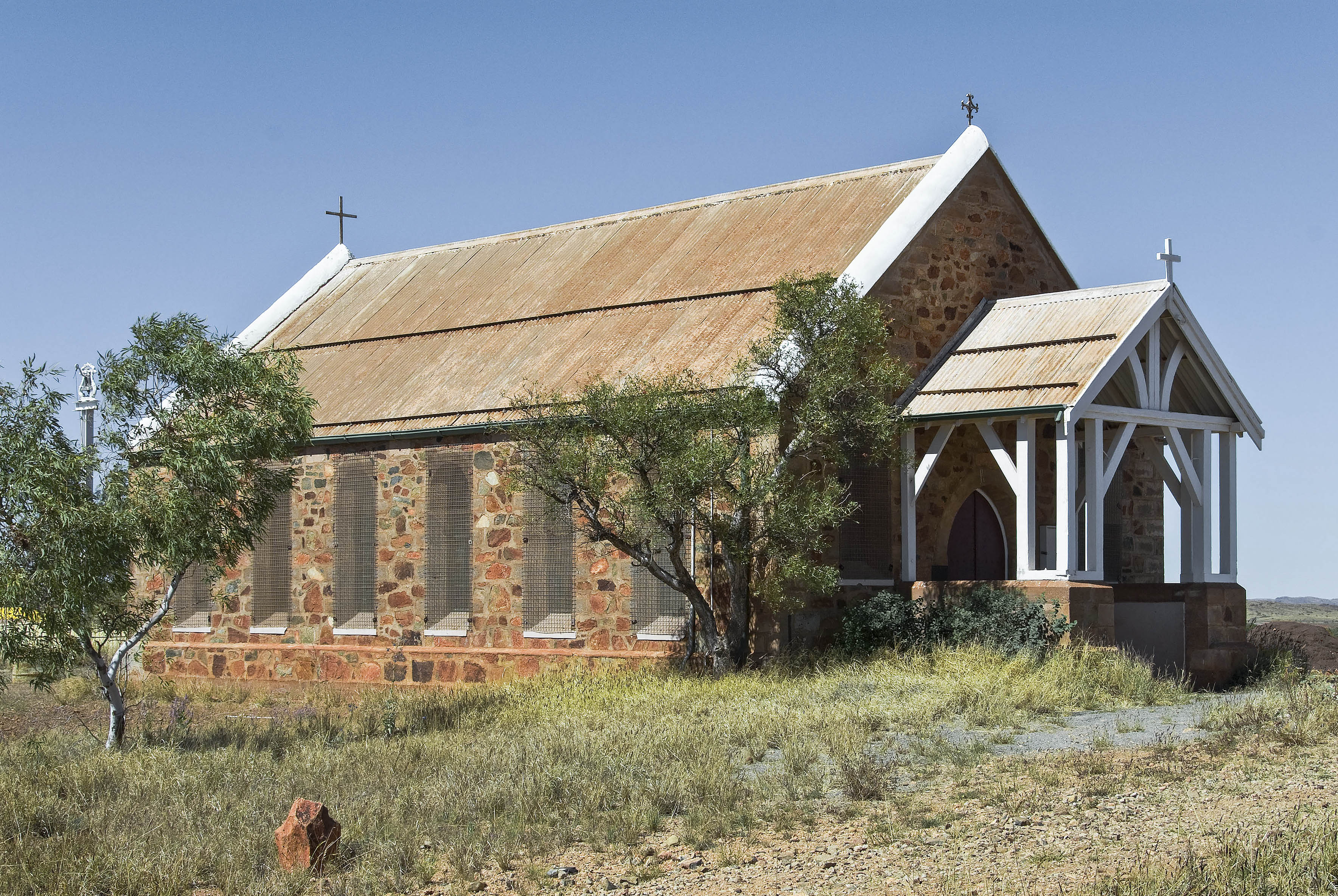
- The church in 2009
- Holy Trinity Anglican Church, Roebourne
- 20°46′29″S 117°08′38″E
- Location: Roebourne, Western Australia
- Address: Hampton Street, Roebourne WA 6718
- Country: Australia
- Denomination: Anglican Church of Australia
- Website: Roebourne: Oldest stone building in the North West

History
- Status: Church
- Founded: 1883
- Dedication: Holy Trinity

Architecture
- Functional status: Active
- Architects: Richard Roach Jewell (1883); Mr Mirfin (1894–95)
- Style: Vernacular, with Victorian Romanesque elements
- Years built: 1883, 1894–95
- Construction cost: £500

Specifications
- Materials: Stone, Colorbond steel

Administration
- Province: Western Australia
- Diocese: North West Australia
- Parish: Wickham

Western Australia Heritage Register
- Official name: Holy Trinity Anglican Church
- Type: State Registered Place
- Criteria: 11.1., 11.2., 11.4., 12.1., 12.2., 12.3, 12.4., 12.5.
- Designated: 29 September 1998
- Reference no.: 02332

Holy Trinity Anglican Church is a heritage-listed Anglican church at Hampton Street, Roebourne, Western Australia. It is both the oldest stone building and the oldest church in North West Australia. Completed in 1883, and reconstructed in 1894–95 after being destroyed in a cyclone, it was restored over about a decade in the 2010s, during which time it was again severely damaged by a cyclone.

== History ==
=== Early Anglican worship in Roebourne ===
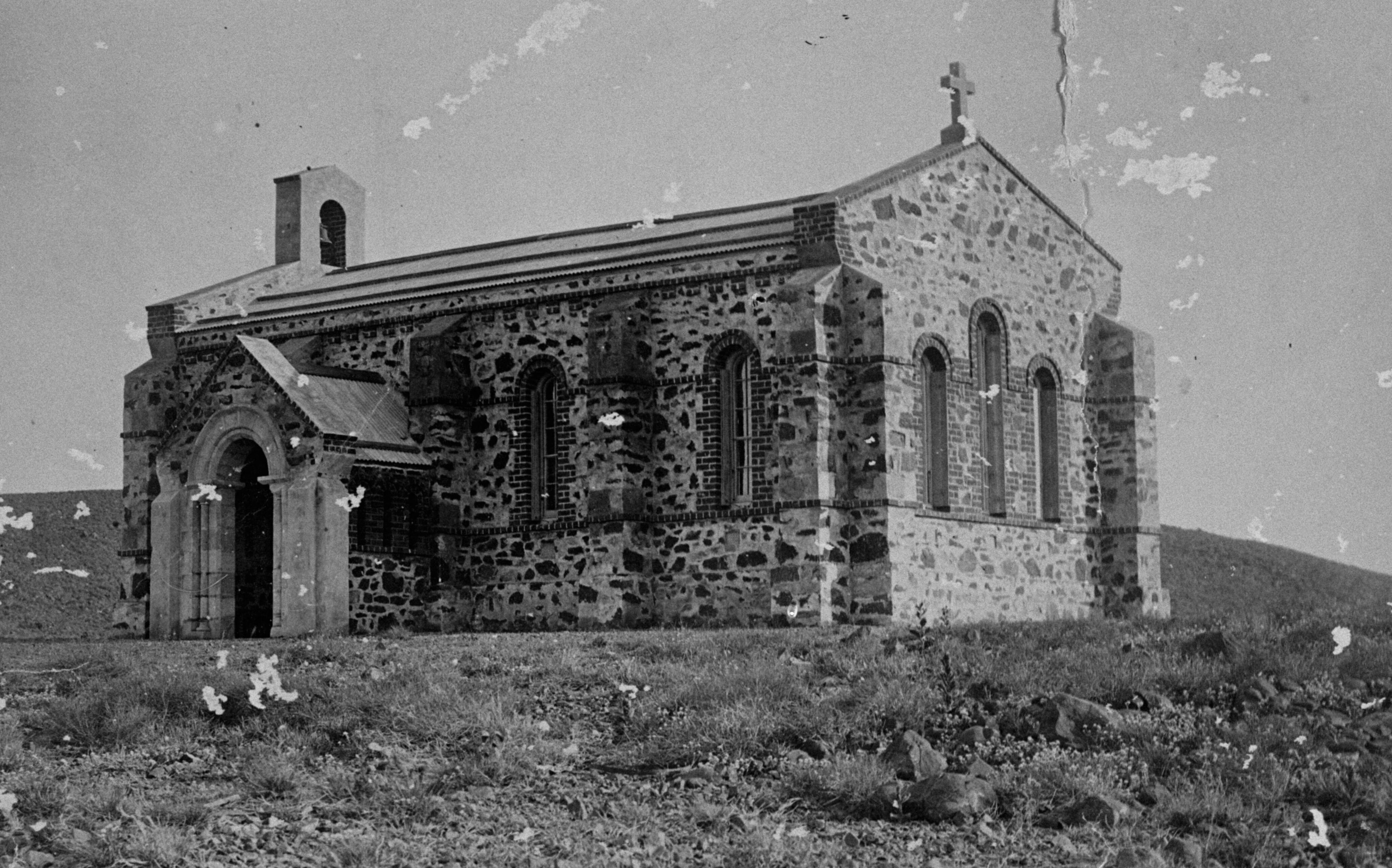
The first church, c. 1890

Following the discovery of good pastoral land in the region now known as the Pilbara by explorer Francis T. Gregory in 1861, Governor John Hampton made special regulations for the settlement of what was designated as the North District of the State. At Gregory's recommendation, his cousin Emma Withnell and her husband John moved to the District, where they established a sheep station on the banks of the Harding River at the foot of Mount Welcome.

In 1865, Robert John Sholl, the Government Resident of the North District, arrived at the Harding River to assist in founding a settlement. Eventually he decided that the Withnells' camp was most suitable for a townsite. On 17 August 1866, the site was proclaimed as the first gazetted town in the North West. It was named Roebourne, after John Septimus Roe, the first Surveyor-General of Western Australia, and the nearby site later named Cossack was designated as its port. From the time of his arrival in the area, Sholl conducted Anglican services in his home.

On 14 June 1878, a public meeting chaired by Sholl was held at Cossack Government School to discuss the establishment of a church in the North District. As a consequence, Reserve 319 on the southeastern slopes of Mount Welcome in Hampton Street, Roebourne, was set aside for church purposes in December 1878. Rev William Hayton was appointed in 1879, and the parish of Roebourne was declared in 1882. Following some years of fundraising, a cornerstone for a first church was laid on 23 May 1882 at the Hampton Street site, which is now the site of the present Anglican church.

The first church was designed by Richard Roach Jewell, the colony's Superintendent of Works. It was completed in 1883. Most of the money raised to build it was donated by the Sholl family in memory of their son Treverton, who had been lost at sea during a shipwreck. By 1889, the "area of parish [was] 500 miles by 100 miles. Church population 600."

=== Destruction, reconstruction and slow deterioration ===
In January 1894, the first church was destroyed by a cyclone. A building fund was established to raise funds for a replacement, and many prominent families and businesses connected with the North District made donations. Much of the local stone of which the first church had been built, and possibly also the original font, survived the first church's destruction. The remaining fragments, together with other materials shipped direct from England via Singapore, were used to build the present, reconstructed church, which has a number of adaptations to the local environment.

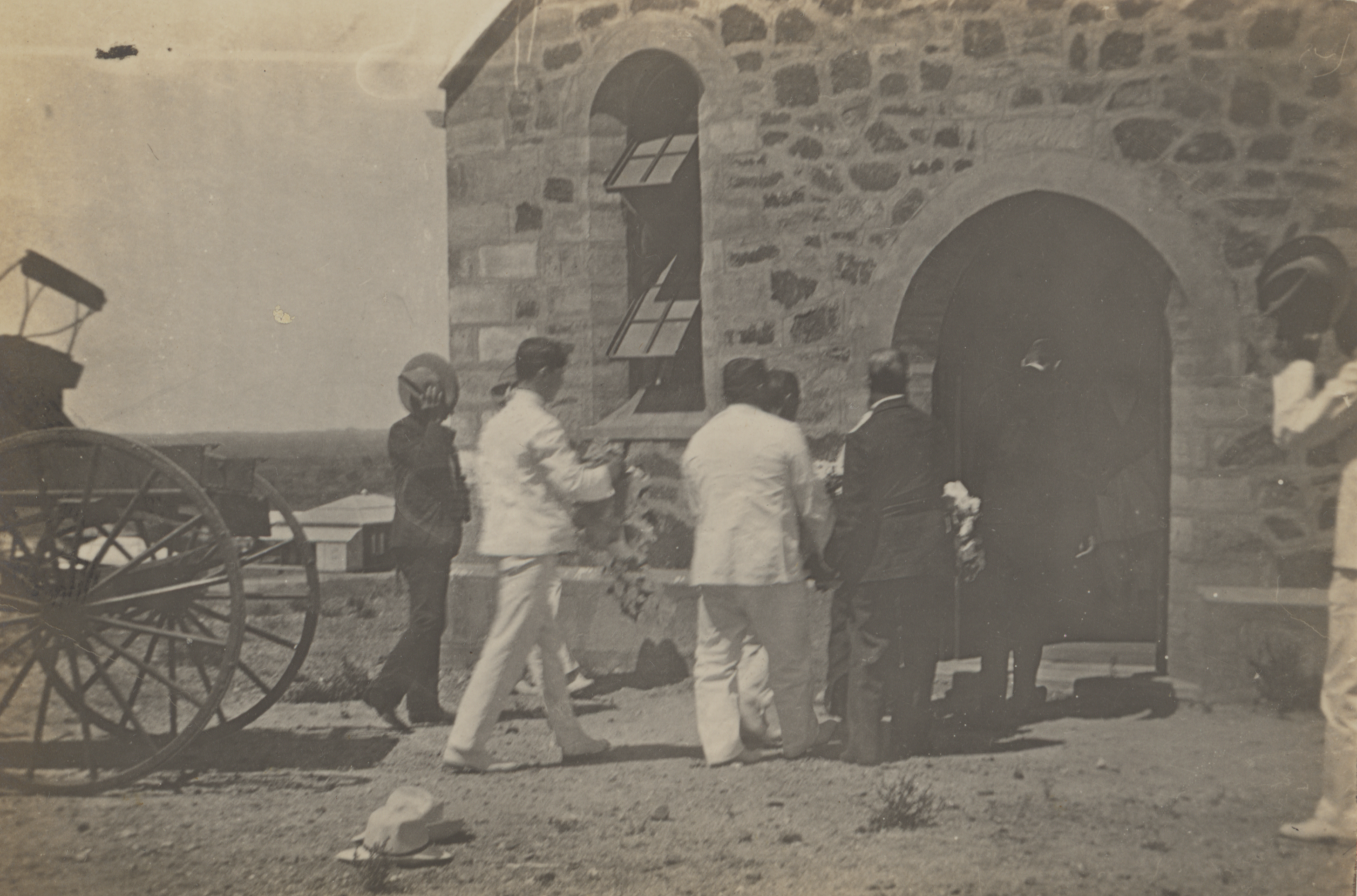
A funeral at the church in 1911, before the porch had been built.

The present church was designed and constructed by Mr Mirfin of Perth at a cost of £500. Its foundation stone was laid on 9 December 1894 and incorporated the first church's original brass plate. Following its completion on 15 December 1895, the church was consecrated by Charles Riley, then the Bishop, and later the first Archbishop, of the Diocese of Perth, on 31 May 1896. The following year, a rectory was built just to the west of the church; the rector lived there until 1920, when Rev Henry Wood Simpson began ministering from Broome.

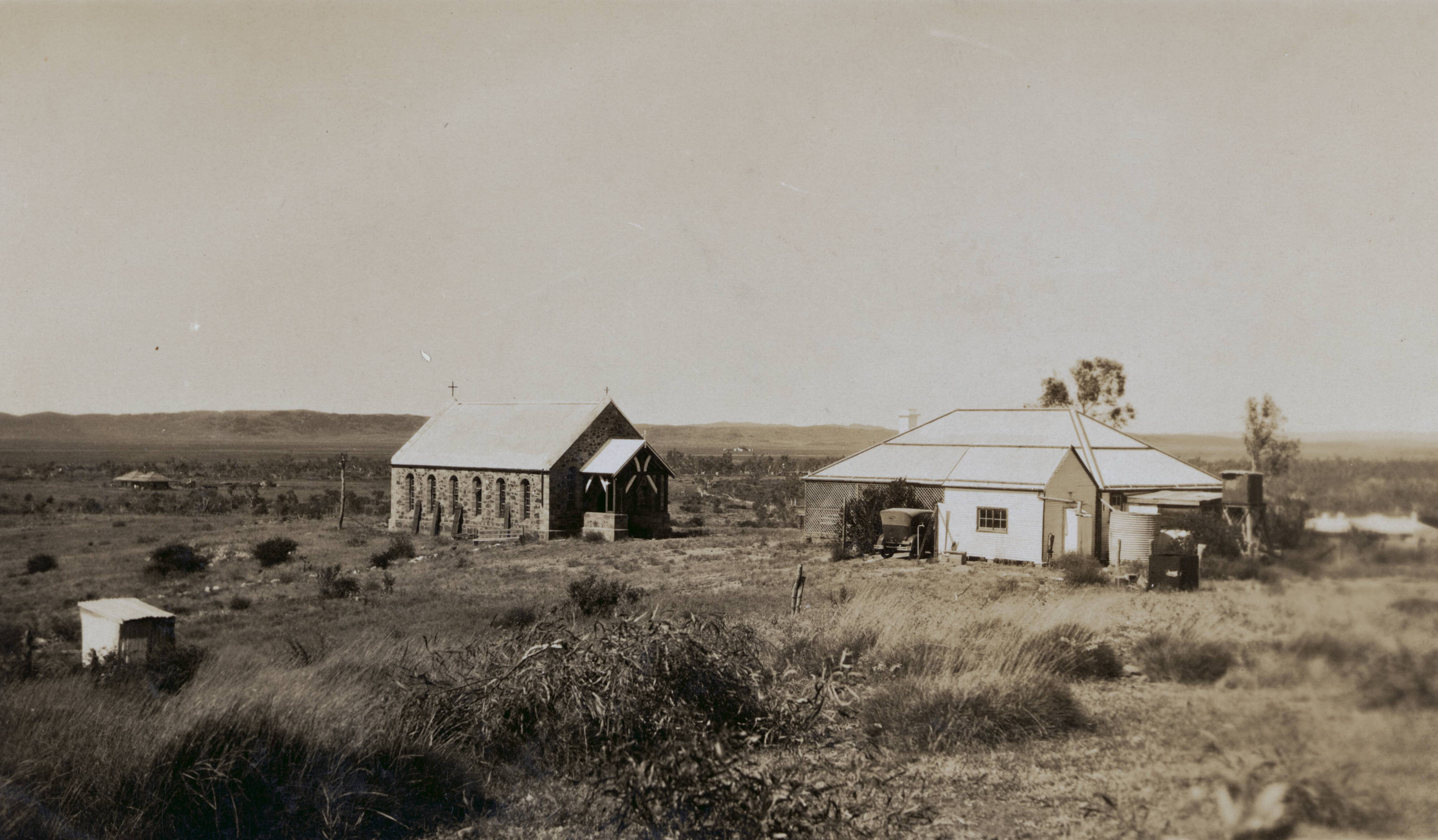
The church and rectory in 1929

In 1925, new seats and windows were installed in the church and work was commenced on a new apse at a cost of £350. Gerard Trower, the first Bishop of North West Australia, held the first Holy Communion in the apse on 13 December 1925; he consecrated it on 18 January 1927. Meanwhile, Rev Simpson moved to Roebourne as Archdeacon in 1926; during that year, the front porch was added to the building.

On 24 May 1931, Mr J.H. Church donated a stained glass window. The same day, the chancel screen was dedicated to the memory of William Shakespeare Hall, who had been in Gregory's exploration party in 1861, and had later worked on many early pastoral stations in the District, including the Withnells' pastoral leases.

In 1938, the rectory was severely damaged by a cyclone. Archdeacon Simpson continued living there until his death in 1946, but since then there have been no clergy resident in Roebourne. In 1957, the parish became part of a Port Hedland-based, Bush Church Aid-supported parish. In the 1960s, a new floor and electrical wiring was fitted to the church, and in 1963 the pulpit from Christ Church, Geraldton, was installed.

In 1967, responsibility for the church passed to a newly formed parish based at the new industrial port of Dampier. In 1970, the church's seating was renewed. In 1974, the parish name was changed to West Pilbara. Meanwhile, the rectory fell into disrepair; eventually, in the mid-1970s, it was demolished. In 1980, T.B. Williams became the rector responsible for the church. He was based at Wickham, another new town established to support the iron ore mining industry. The following year, he was succeeded by Rev R.A.F. McDonald. In 1983, a special service was held to celebrate the centenary of the building of the first church on the site; over 100 people attended. In 1985, the parish of West Pilbara was divided between two separate parishes, based at Karratha and Wickham, respectively, with the latter new parish also covering Roebourne, Pannawonica and Point Samson. Rev McDonald remained as rector based in Wickham until 1987.

By that time, use of the church had declined. During the 1980s, screens were fitted to protect the church's windows from both cyclones and vandals. From the early 1990s, there were no regular services in the church, except at Easter and Christmas. In 1995, a pair of stained-glass windows was commissioned to mark the centenary of the reconstructed church; they were designed and made by Hilde and Richard Apel formerly of Mallina Station.

However, by the time Richard Goscombe arrived to take up the role of Anglican Minister in Wickham in 2009, the church had been subjected to decades of neglect in harsh outback conditions. It was literally falling apart, with gaps in the stone walls, and cracked windows seized shut many years earlier. Salt leaching out of the stonework and mortar had rusted and compressed the windows, and jammed most of them open, allowing water inside and increasing the damage to the interior.

=== Restoration ===
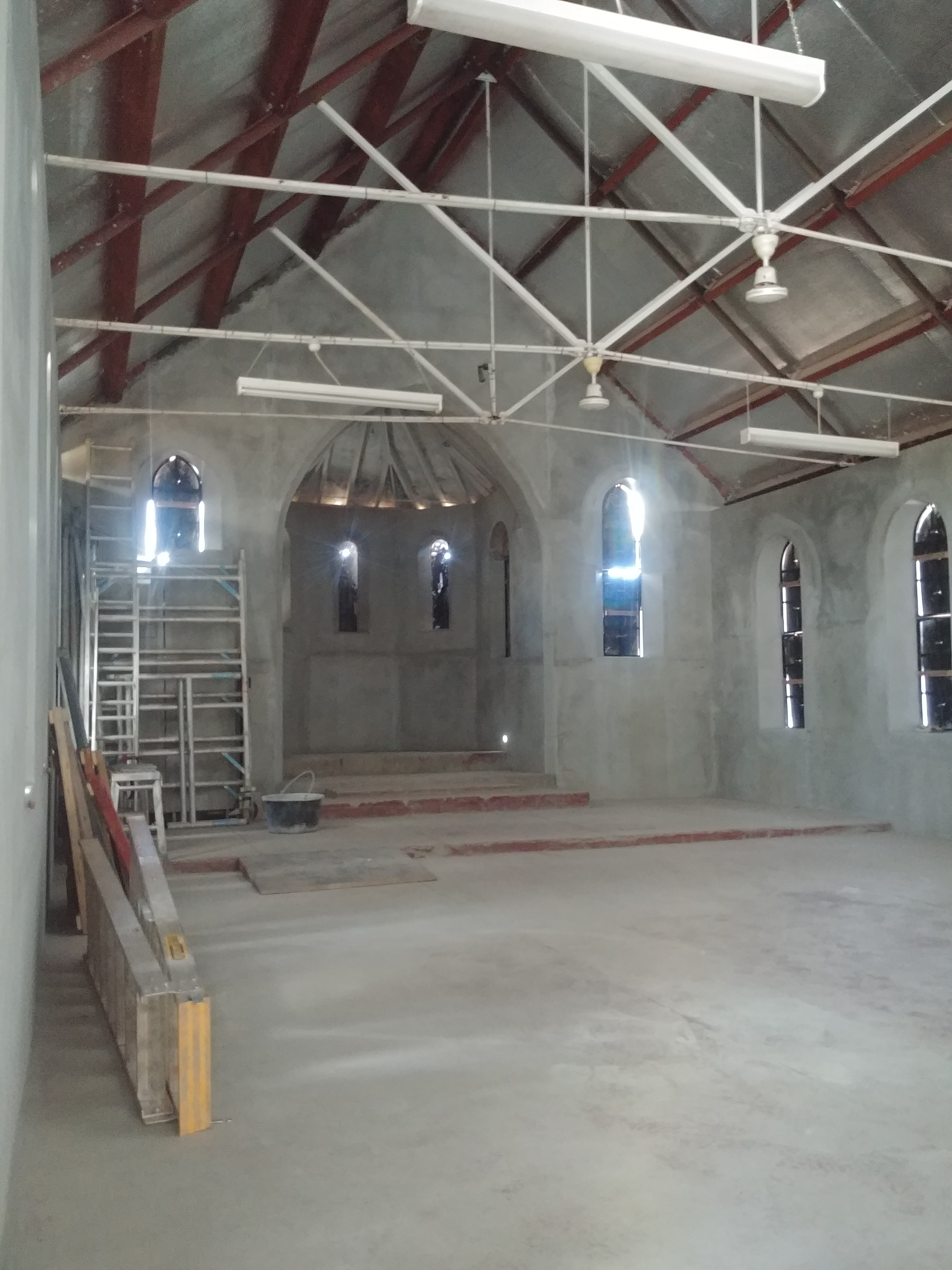
The interior undergoing restoration in 2019

Fortuitously, Goscombe then came into contact with David Baessler over a beer at a barbecue. Baessler, a stonemason from Amberg, Germany, had experience in restoring churches in Europe, and was backpacking in the area. He decided to stay, and he and Goscombe started working together on restoring the church, bit by bit, with the support of the Friends of the Holy Trinity Church, and funded by small community donations.

In 2013, Cyclone Christine struck Roebourne, causing major damage to the church's front porch and main roof. Two years later, the insurance payout was made, and restoration of the church began in earnest. In 2016, the Wickham parish and the Friends of the Holy Trinity Church combined with the National Trust of Western Australia to establish a conservation management plan, and to launch an appeal for restoration funding.

Additional funding of over AUD 400,000 later arrived, including in the form of grants from the National Trust and Heritage Council of Western Australia, along with $100,000 from an anonymous benefactor. According to Baessler, the restoration was "challenging at times"; it included repairs to the roof and stone floor, creation of shutters and unique leadlighting and a complete rendering of the interior.

In July 2020, the keys to the restored church were handed to Goscombe's successor, Wickham community chaplain Matt Warth. In early 2021, monthly services resumed. In May 2021, more than 50 people, headed by the Bishop of North West Australia, Gary Nelson, attended a ceremony to mark the completion of the church's restoration and, belatedly, the 125th anniversary of its reconstruction. Further work, including new driveways and an historical display, was scheduled.

== Description ==
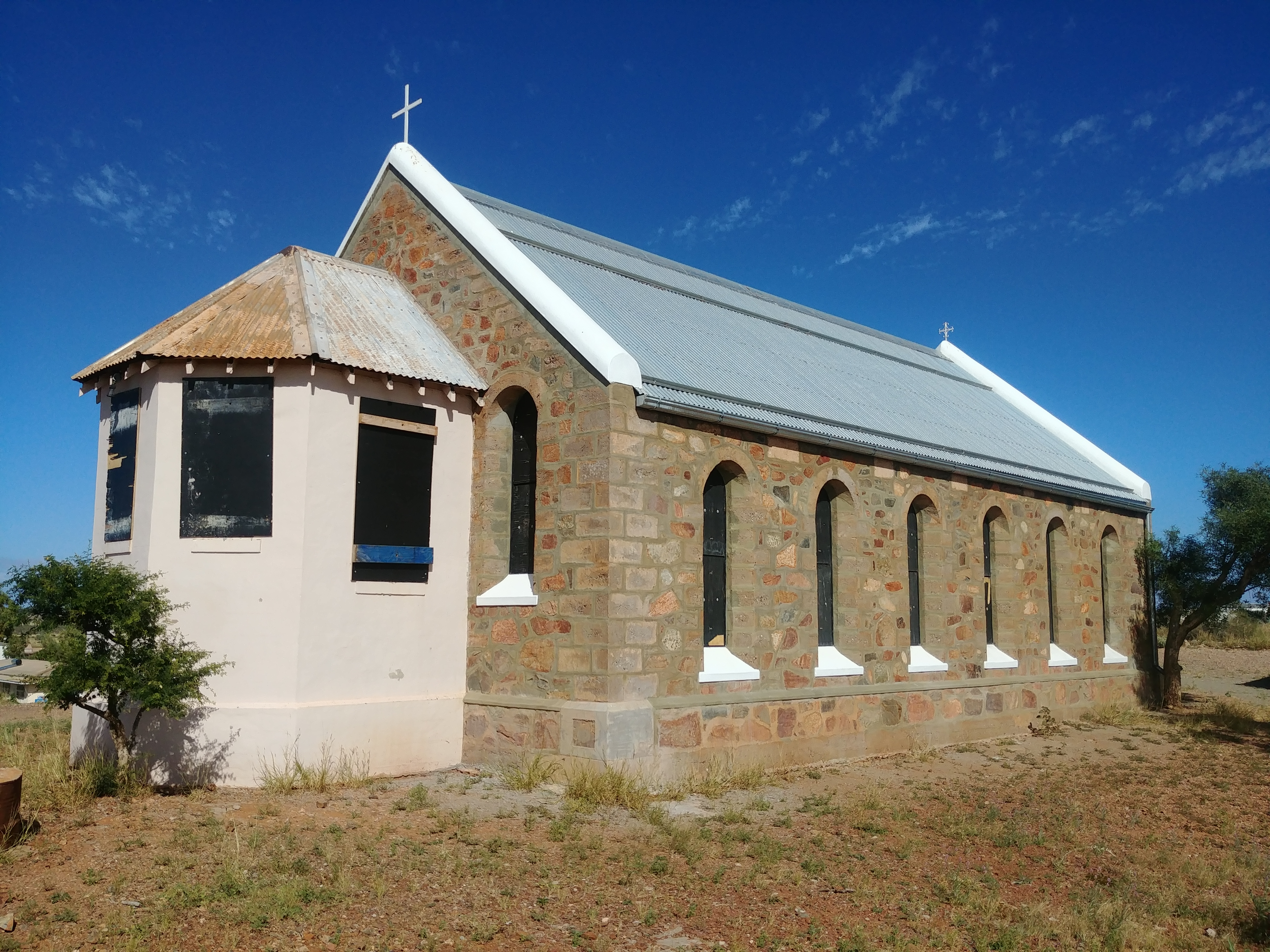
View of the north eastern exterior, including the apse, in 2019

The church is located on a low ridge on the south-eastern slopes of Mount Welcome, and at the south-western corner of the nineteenth-century town centre. The site is a landmark in Roebourne, and commands views over the town, surrounding country and coast.

The building is both the oldest stone building and the oldest church in North West Australia. A simple rectangle in shape, it has six windows evenly spaced along each side, and two at the front entrance and two more in the back walls. In conformity with Christian tradition, it is oriented, with gothic arched heavy metal-studded double entrance doors and an open timber-framed porch at the western end, and an octagonal apse extending from the eastern end.

The design of the building is vernacular in style, with Victorian Romanesque elements, and adaptations to suit the local climate and methods of building. The adaptions include iron window frames and concrete floors resistant to cyclones and white ants. The walls are constructed of local stone laid in mortar in a random pattern, with pointing and tucking in composite concrete. At the base of the walls is a perimeter stone plinth. The pitched roof was originally made of corrugated iron, but is now Colorbond steel. The interior walls are rendered and painted, and the iron roof trusses exposed. Decorative elements of the building include articulated quoins on the exterior of the walls, stained-glass windows, and the original black wrought-iron interior chancel screen.

The church bell, which is mounted on a timber post at the rear of the church, is from the wrecked sailing ship Aberlady. An iron-hulled, barque-rigged vessel, the Aberlady was built in Scotland in 1875. She foundered just two years later on the Alceste Reef, Gaspar Strait in the then Dutch East Indies, en route from Hong Kong to New York. Within a few days, her wreck was offered for sale in Singapore and sold 'As lies, where lies'. Just who purchased the bell and took it to Roebourne is not known; it may previously have been used in Cossack to call worshippers to church services there.

== See also ==
- List of Anglican churches in Western Australia
- List of State Register of Heritage Places in the City of Karratha
