= Trinity Theological College, Perth =

Theological college in Leederville, Perth, Australia

Trinity Theological College
- Former names: Perth Centre for Applied Christian Studies (PCACS) and Westminster Theological College (Perth)
- Motto: "Preparing people for effective Christian service"
- Type: Private Theological College
- Established: 1997
- Accreditation: TEQSA (via the AUT)
- Affiliations: Australian University of Theology
- Religious affiliation: Christian, Evangelical, Reformed
- Chairman: Murray Thornhill
- Principal: Daniel Cole
- Academic staff: 6
- Administrative staff: 14
- Students: 95
- Location: 632 Newcastle Street, Leederville, Perth, Western Australia, Australia; 31.93846°S 115.84413°E
- Campus: Suburban
- Website: ttc.wa.edu.au

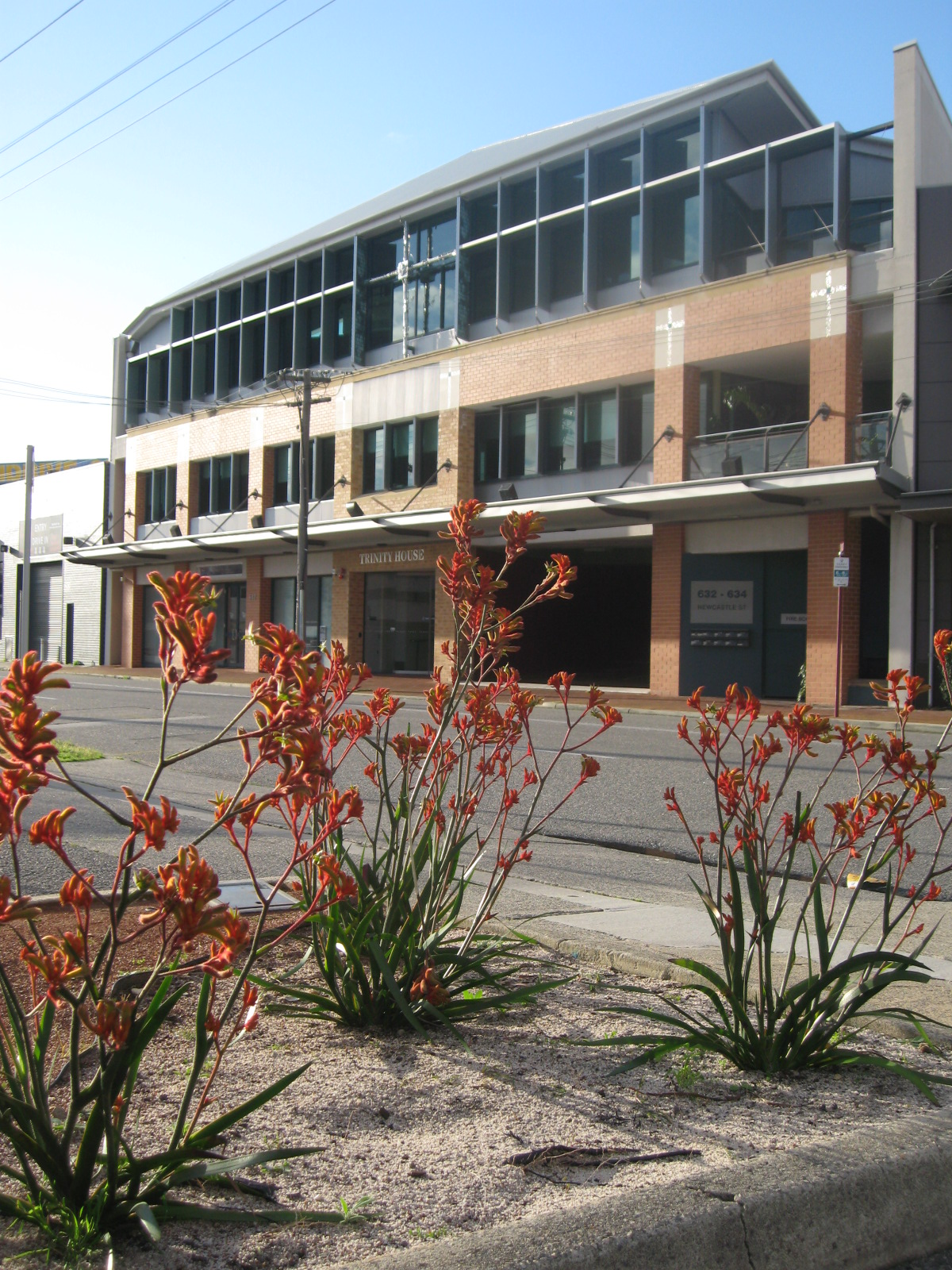
Trinity Theological College, Leederville

Trinity Theological College, located in Leederville, Perth, Western Australia, is an independent theological college which provides tertiary education within the evangelical and reformed Christian traditions. Its courses are accredited through the Australian University of Theology (AUT), and range from undergraduate diplomas through to postgraduate research degrees.

As a non-denominational theological college, Trinity provides education to both men and women across a range of denominations, including Anglican, Baptist, and Presbyterian. Additionally, it is the recognised training college for the Anglican Diocese of North West Australia, the Westminster Presbyterian Church and the Presbyterian Church of Western Australia.

== History ==
Trinity Theological College was formed at the end of 1997 with the merging of the Perth Centre for Applied Christian Studies (PCACS) and Westminster Theological College (Perth). This followed two years of prayer, planning, and preparations by college boards and principals (Allan Chapple and Stephen Rarig).

Trinity was located at Westminster Presbyterian Church in Bull Creek from 1998 to 2003. In May 2004 the main campus moved to a purpose-designed premises in Leederville called Trinity House.

Trustees, faculty, staff and students come from a wide cross-section of churches and backgrounds.

Trinity is the recognised training college for the Diocese of North West Australia of the Anglican Church of Australia, the Westminster Presbyterian Church and the Presbyterian Church of Western Australia. Many churches, missionary societies, schools and other ministries send people to be trained at Trinity and employ their graduates.

== Courses ==
Courses fully accredited through the AUT range from undergraduate diplomas through to postgraduate research degrees, with the central award being the Master of Divinity (MDiv).

Additionally, Trinity offers a number of courses designed for regular church members. The Certificate of Christian Studies provides various short courses. While the two-year non-degree program 'Trinity Equip' is taught by women, to equip women for volunteer ministry.

== Facilities ==
The main campus, Trinity House, is located in Leederville, 5 kilometres (3.1 mi) from the Perth CBD. Learning spaces include three lecture rooms, a tutorial room, and locations for private and group study.

The library mains both digital and physical collections, with the physical collection containing over 31,000 monographs.

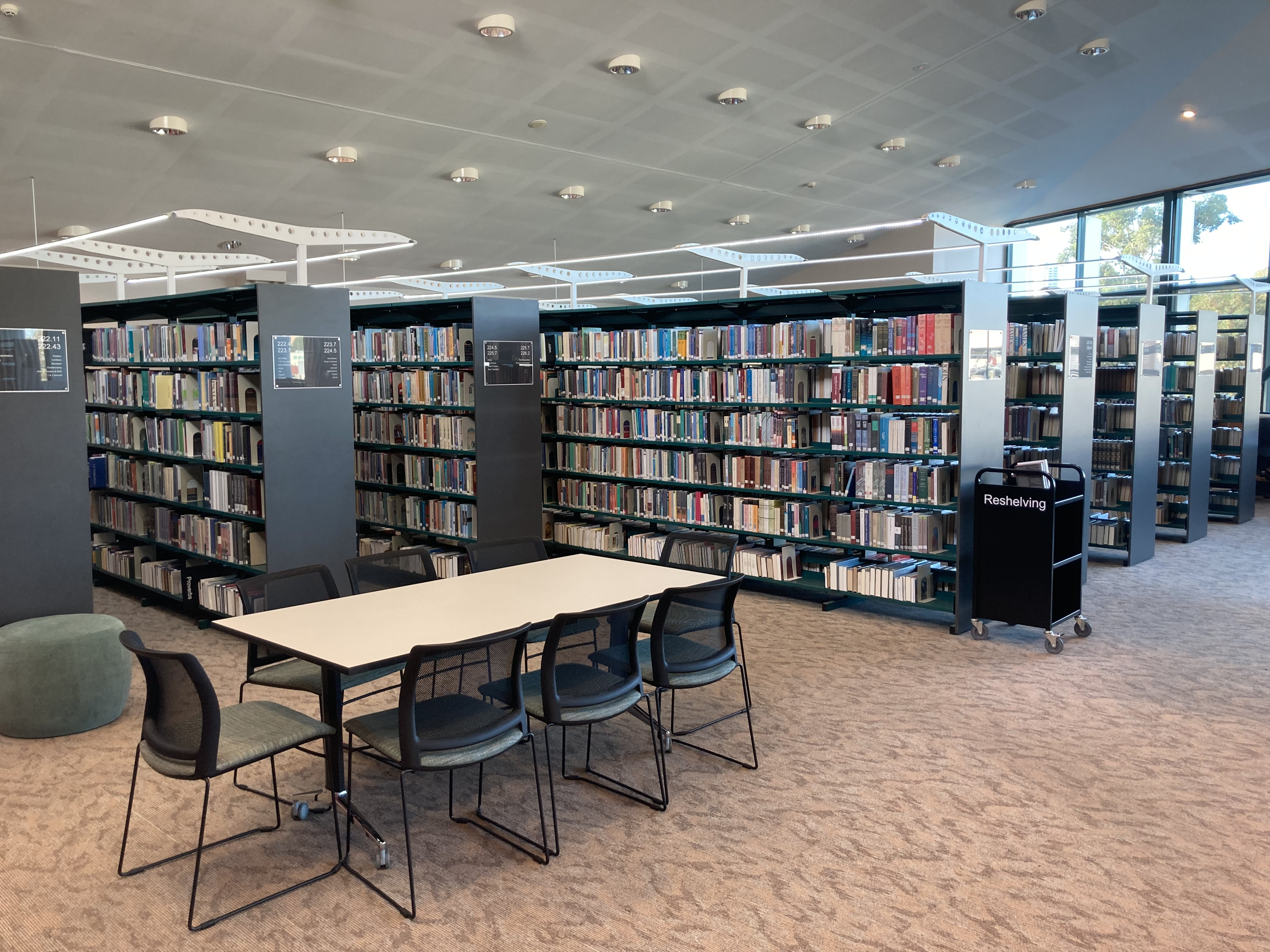
Trinity Library

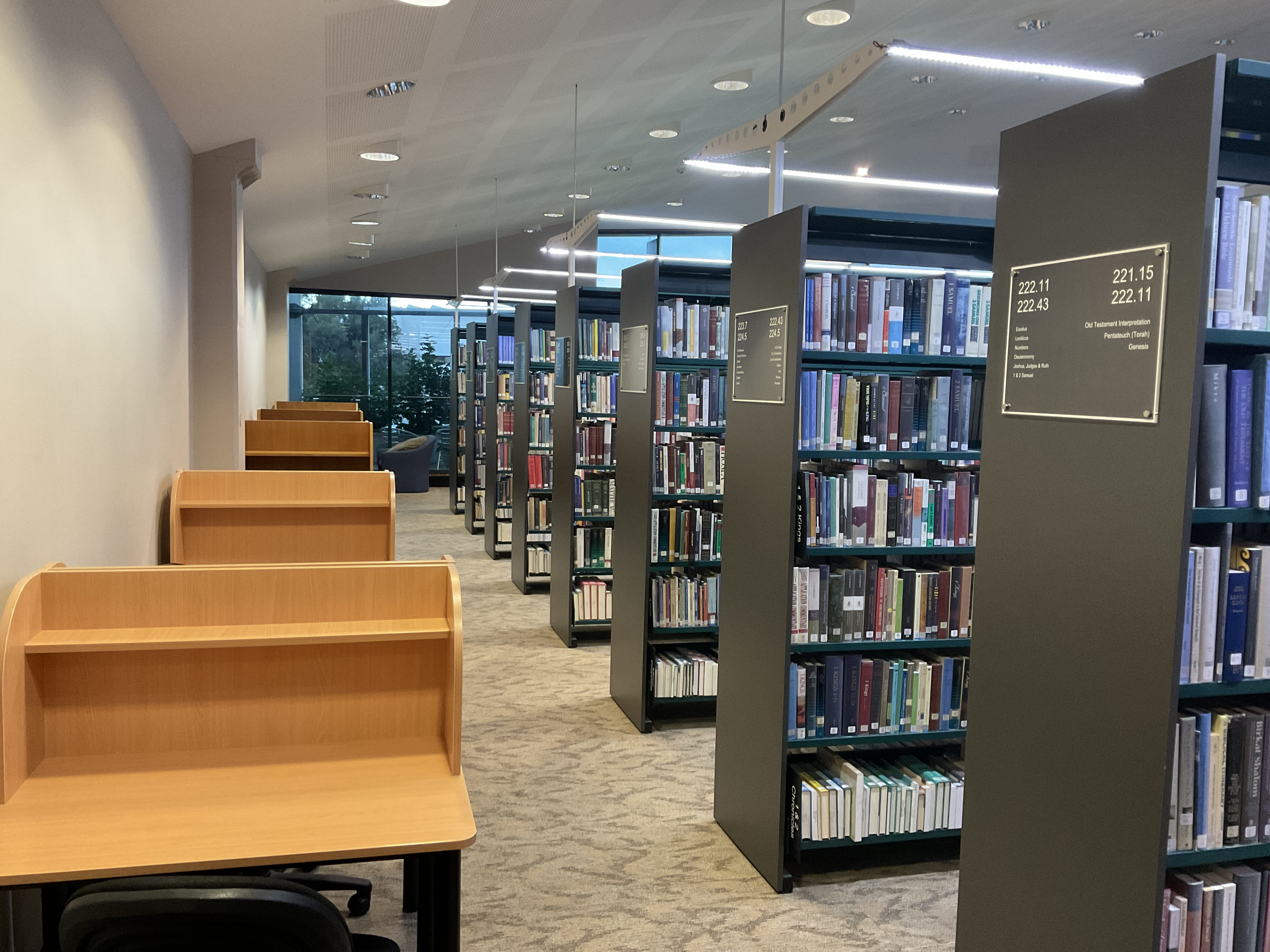
Library study spaces

== Principles ==
- 1998–2002: Allan Chappel
- 2003–2024: Donald West
- 2025–present: Daniel Cole

== Notable people ==
=== Faculty and Staff ===
Notable past faculty includes Tony Nichols, who served as Dean of Students and Biblical Studies Lecturer at Trinity after his retirement as Bishop of North West Australia.

=== Alumni ===
- Bishop James Kwang, Bishop of the Chinese Methodist Church in Australia, Perth
- Lachlan Edwards, Dean of the Cathedral of the Holy Cross, Geraldton.
