= Tony Nichols =

Australian Anglican bishop

The Right Reverend Tony Nichols
- Bishop of North West Australia
- Church: Anglican Church of Australia
- Province: Province of Western Australia
- Diocese: Diocese of North West Australia
- Installed: 1992
- Term ended: 2003
- Predecessor: Ged Muston
- Successor: David Mulready

Orders
- Ordination: 1963 (as priest)

Personal details
- Born: Anthony Howard Nichols; 29 March 1938
- Died: 24 August 2019 (aged 81)
- Denomination: Anglicanism
- Spouse: Judith

Anthony Howard Nichols (29 March 1938 – 24 August 2019) was an Australian Anglican bishop.

Nichols obtained academic qualifications from the Universities of Sydney, London, Sheffield and Macquarie University. He was a Latin and history teacher until his ordination to the priesthood in 1963. He had curacies at St Paul's Chatswood and St Bede's Drummoyne. He was a lecturer in Biblical Studies at Moore College, Sydney from 1968 to 1981 and Dean of the Faculty of Theology at Satya Wacana Christian University until 1987. A further academic appointment at St Andrew's Hall, Melbourne (a Church Mission Society training college) was followed by his ordination to the episcopate as the fifth Bishop of North West Australia in 1992, a position he held until 2003.

After retiring as Bishop of North West Australia, he was Dean of Students and a lecturer in Biblical Studies at Trinity Theological College in Perth and later worked as an Assistant Minister at Dalkeith Anglican Church.

Nichols was married to Judith. His son-in-law, Darrell Parker, became Bishop of North West Australia in 2023.

Nichols died on 24 August 2019, aged 81.

Anglican Communion titles
Preceded by Ged Muston	Bishop of North West Australia; 1992–2003	Succeeded by David Mulready
