= Lazenby (disambiguation) =

Lazenby is a place near Middlesbrough in the borough of Redcar and Cleveland in North Yorkshire, England.

Lazenby may also refer to:

- Lazenby, a place near Northallerton in the parish of Danby Wiske with Lazenby in North Yorkshire, England
- Lazenby (surname), a surname
- 18965 Lazenby, a main-belt asteroid
- Lazenby (Rave Master), a character in the manga series Rave Master

== See also ==
- Lasenby, a surname
