= Anglican Bishop of North West Australia =

Bishop of North West Australia
- Bishopric

anglican
- Coat of arms of the Diocese
- Incumbent: Darrell Parker since 15 February 2023
- Style: The Right Reverend

Location
- Country: Australia
- Ecclesiastical province: Western Australia

Information
- First holder: Gerard Trower
- Denomination: Anglicanism
- Established: 1910
- Diocese: North West Australia
- Cathedral: Cathedral of the Holy Cross, Geraldton

Website
- Diocese of North West Australia

The Bishop of North West Australia is the diocesan bishop of the Anglican Diocese of North West Australia.

== List of Bishops of North West Australia ==
Bishops of Perth including North West Australia (until 1906)
No	From	Until	Incumbent	Notes
1	1857	1875	Mathew Hale	Translated to Brisbane.
2	1876	1893	Henry Parry	Died in office.
3	1894	1914	Charles Riley	Became Archbishop of Perth.
Bishop of Bunbury including North West Australia (until 1910)
1	1904	1917	Frederick Goldsmith	Previously Dean of Perth; resigned and returned to England.
Bishops of North West Australia
1	1910	1927	Gerard Trower	Translated from Nyasaland.
2	1928	1965	John Frewer	Previously a canon of the Diocese of Bunbury.
3	1965	1981	Howell Witt	Translated to Bathurst.
4	1981	1992	Ged Muston	Previously an assistant bishop in the Diocese of Melbourne.
5	1992	2003	Tony Nichols	
6	2003	2011	David Mulready	
7	2012	2022	Gary Nelson	Installed 26 May 2012. Retired 15 May 2022.
8	2023	Present	Darrell Parker	Installed on 15 February 2023. Formerly Vicar of St Paul's, Tamworth, New South Wales.
