= List of State Register of Heritage Places in the Shire of Broome =

List of heritage sites in the Kimberley region of Western Australia

The State Register of Heritage Places is maintained by the Heritage Council of Western Australia. As of 2026, 145 places are heritage-listed in the Shire of Broome,^{[N1]} of which 53 are on the State Register of Heritage Places.^{[N2]}

== List ==
The Western Australian State Register of Heritage Places, as of 2026, lists the following 53 state registered places within the Shire of Broome:

| Place name | Place # | Street number | Street name | Suburb or town | Co-ordinates | Notes & former names | Photo |
|---|---|---|---|---|---|---|---|
| Matso's Store & Captain Gregory's House | 290 | 29 | Hamersley Street | Broome | 17.961946°S 122.24066°E | Union Bank (former), Streeter's No.2 Store, Monsoon Gallery | |
| Chinatown Conservation Area | 291 | | Frederick/Chapple/Short Streets | Broome | 17.952289°S 122.244173°E | Includes Aboriginal Site - Undanda | |
| Uniting Church, Broome | 292 | 11 | Anne Street | Broome | 17.962303°S 122.236591°E | Brady Memorial Hall | |
| Sun Picture Gardens | 293 | 8 | Carnarvon Street | Broome | 17.95344°S 122.24307°E | Sun Picture Theatre, Dry Goods Store | |
| Old Police Lockup & Boab Tree | 294 | 22 | Carnarvon Street | Broome | 17.955974°S 122.242515°E | Pilgrim Music | |
| Roebuck Bay Hotel | 295 | 30 | Dampier Terrace | Broome | 17.954864°S 122.244247°E | The 'Roey' | |
| Broome Court House | 296 | 8 | Hamersley Street | Broome | 17.95695°S 122.24033°E | Public Works Department, Cable Station, Cable House | |
| Anglican Church of the Annunciation | 297 | 21 | Hamersley Street | Broome | 17.9604°S 122.2409°E | Pro Cathedral of the Annunciation, The Little White Church | |
| Broome Bowling Club | 298 | 78 & 80 | Herbert Street | Broome | 17.963637°S 122.233136°E | Broome Coastal Wireless Station, OTC Building, AWA Communications staff quarters | |
| Pa Norman's House, Broome | 299 | 47 | Walcott Street | Broome | 17.96315°S 122.235656°E | Pa (Captain Hughes) Norman's Residence (former) | |
| Kennedy's Store | 300 | 9 | Napier Terrace | Broome | 17.955897°S 122.243482°E | Archie Martins | |
| Broome Cemetery - Japanese/Chinese/Muslim Section | 301 | | Port Drive | Broome | 17.957994°S 122.22302°E | | |
| Broome Pioneer Cemetery | 302 | 87 | Robinson Street | Broome | 17.970068°S 122.236379°E | Seafarer's Cemetery, Seamen's Cemetery | |
| Streeter & Male Group of Stores | 304 | 4 | Short Street | Broome | 17.968297°S 122.236536°E | | |
| Wallal Downs Station Group | 305 | 56 | Great Northern Highway | Eighty Mile Beach | 19.779652°S 120.641031°E | | |
| Lombadina Mission | 690 | | Lombadina | Dampier Peninsula | 16.515678°S 122.892842°E | | |
| Hanoe's Cottage | 2668 | 6 | Carnarvon Street entry Short Street | Broome | 17.953211°S 122.242923°E | | |
| Dampier Memorial | 2669 | 1 | Anne Street | Broome | 17.963058°S 122.23884°E | | |
| McDaniel Homestead | 2910 | 22 | Weld Street | Broome | 17.958138°S 122.238937°E | Blick House | |
| Maurice Lyon's House | 2913 | 17 | Anne Street | Broome | 17.962171°S 122.235843°E | | |
| Broome War Memorial, Bedford Memorial Park | 3593 | bounded by | Weld, Anne & Hamersley Streets | Broome | 17.962964°S 122.23886°E | | |
| Beagle Bay Mission Church | 3630 | | Beagle Bay | Dampier Peninsula | 16.980750°S 122.666051°E | Sacred Heart Church | |
| Streeter's Jetty | 4553 | 1 | Dampier Terrace | Broome | 17.95338°S 122.245526°E | Streeter and Male Jetty | |
| Cottage | 4848 | 3 | Carnarvon Street | Broome | ^{[?]} | Demolished 29 December 2004 | |
| Kinney's Store | 4850 | 25 | Carnarvon Street | Broome | 17.953948°S 122.243765°E | Ellie's Store | |
| Morgan's Camp | 4851 | 622, 16, 18 | Chapple Street | Broome | 17.949739°S 122.244056°E | Pearler's Camp | |
| Broome Pearls, Pearl Shop and Warehouse | 4853 | 29 | Dampier Terrace | Broome | 17.954864°S 122.24477°E | | |
| House, 57 Dampier Terrace | 4854 | 44 | Dampier Terrace | Broome | 17.956275°S 122.24393°E | Goode Durrant & Murray Showroom, Old Divers' Quarters, Old Pearlers' House | |
| Bourne & Inglis Store (former) | 4858 | 30 | Hamersley Street | Broome | 17.964171°S 122.237525°E | Paspaley Pearls Storage | |
| Flying Boat Wreckage Site | 4859 | | Roebuck Bay | Broome | 17.984713°S 122.24652°E | Catalina Wrecks | |
| Sailmakers' Shed (former), Broome | 5250 | 71 | Robinson Street | Broome | 17.968297°S 122.236536°E | HMAS Broome - Naval Cadets Training Unit, PWD Storage, Water Corp Depot | |
| St John of God Convent (former), Broome | 5307 | 11 | Barker Street | Broome | 17.958961°S 122.238412°E | Centacare | |
| Community Health Services | 5368 | 12 | Anne Street | Broome | 17.961461°S 122.236079°E | Broome Hospital Nurses' Quarters, Commonwealth Health Laboratory | |
| Cape Leveque Lighthouse | 7198 | L 100 & 3001 | Broome-Cape Leveque Road | Dampier Peninsula | 16.3947°S 122.92797°E | | |
| Male Sheds and Jetty | 8782 | 1 | Dampier Terrace | Broome | 17.951134°S 122.245391°E | Male Boat Sheds and Jetty | |
| Napier Terrace Cottages | 14007 | 3 | Napier Terrace | Broome | 17.955939°S 122.243888°E | Joybelle's Ladies Wear | |
| Broome Primary School Music Room | 15730 | 38 | Weld Street | Broome | 17.960656°S 122.238018°E | Broome Special School, Broome Junior High School | |
| Bob's Shoe Store | 15876 | 2b/30 | Carnarvon Street | Broome | ^{[?]} | formerly part of T.B. Ellies' store | |
| Anastasia's Pearl Gallery | 15877 | | Carnarvon Street | Broome | ^{[?]} | formerley part of T.B.Ellies stores | |
| Ah Ming's Store & Residence (former) | 15878 | 14 | Carnarvon Street | Broome | 17.953992°S 122.242968°E | Mr Kwok Cheung Yee, Dampier's Chest | |
| Old Tang Wei Cafe & Residence | 15879 | 16 | Carnarvon Street | Broome | 17.954171°S 122.242933°E | | |
| Tack's Store (former) | 15880 | 12 | Carnarvon Street | Broome | 17.95338°S 122.245526°E | Terri's Travel | |
| Shekki Shed Gallery | 15881 | 10 | Carnarvon Street | Broome | 17.953612°S 122.243153°E | | |
| Offices | 15882 | 58 | Carnarvon Street | Broome | ^{[?]} | | |
| Offices | 16828 | 41 | Carnarvon Street | Broome | 17.956158°S 122.243083°E | | |
| Commemoratives | 16848 | 15 & 27 | Dampier Terrace | Broome | 17.954345°S 122.243337°E | | |
| Shiba Lane (site) | 16849 | | Napier Terrace | Broome | 17.956002°S 122.243392°E | Sheba Lane Cafe | |
| Blooms Cafe Restaurant | 16877 | 12 | Carnarvon Street | Broome | 17.953769°S 122.243011°E | | |
| Lyons Tate Office | 16878 | 10 | Carnarvon Street | Broome | 17.953702°S 122.243136°E | Akim's Bakery (former) | |
| Bull Pen Shelter Shed and Archaeological Deposits | 19855 | 13 | Hamersley Street | Broome | 17.958142°S 122.241244°E | Bull Pen (Broome Prison), Broome Gaol, Native Cell, Broome Regional Prison | |
| Sheba Lane Cafe | 23977 | 5 | Napier Terrace | Broome | 17.955866°S 122.243852°E | Annelies Restaurant, Ibasco's hairdresser, Castaways | |
| Sub-Collector's Residence (former), Broome | 26925 | 69 | Robinson Street | Broome | 17.968029°S 122.236172°E | Customs Residence (former), Broome | |
| Customs House and Sub-Collector's Residence, Broome | 27015 | 67-69 | Robinson Street | Broome | 17.968031°S 122.236362°E | | |

== Notes ==
- ^[N1]A search for Broome LGA returns 361 hits, of which 215 are for the Broomehill-Tambellup LGA, 145 for Broome LGA and one for Wyndham-East Kimberley LGA
- ^[N2]A search for Broome LGA returns 58 hits, of which five are for the Broomehill-Tambellup LGA and 53 for Broome LGA
- ^[?]No coordinates specified by Inherit database
