= Lazenby (surname) =

Lazenby is a surname. Notable people with the surname include:

- Alec Lazenby (born 1927), academic
- George Lazenby (born 1939), actor
- George Lazenby (cabinetmaker) (1807–1895)
- Roland Lazenby, American sportswriter and educator
- Simon Lazenby, TV presenter and lead presenter of Formula One for Sky Sports
- Tracy Lazenby (born 1959), former English professional rugby player
- William Lazenby (died c. 1888), English publisher of pornography
