= Bishop of North West Australia =

Bishop of North West Australia may refer to:

- Anglican Bishop of North West Australia
- Bishop of the Roman Catholic Diocese of Broome
- Bishop of the Roman Catholic Diocese of Geraldton
