= Cathedral of the Holy Cross, Geraldton =

Church in Western Australia

Cathedral of the Holy Cross
- Cathedral Church of the Holy Cross, Geraldton
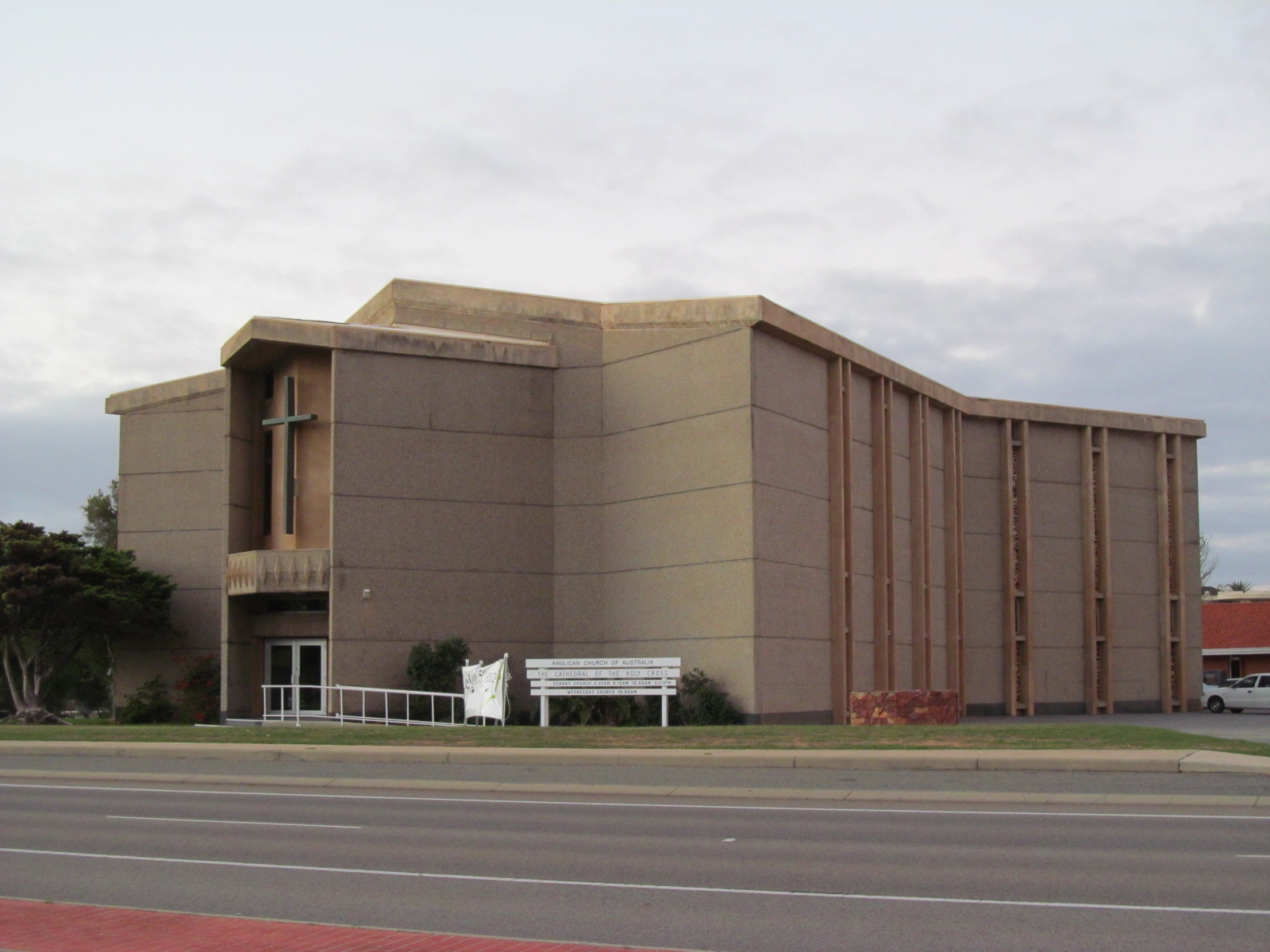
- Cathedral of the Holy Cross
- 28°46′44″S 114°36′53″E
- Location: Geraldton, Western Australia
- Address: 101 Cathedral Ave, Geraldton WA 6530
- Country: Australia
- Denomination: Anglican Church of Australia
- Churchmanship: Low church, Evangelical
- Website: Geraldton Anglicans

History
- Status: Cathedral
- Consecrated: 8 March 1964

Architecture
- Functional status: Active
- Heritage designation: State Register of Heritage Places
- Designated: 25 June 2004
- Architect(s): Ean McDonald & Edwin Whitaker
- Architectural type: Cathedral
- Style: Post-War Ecclesiastical
- Years built: 1963-1964

Administration
- Province: Western Australia
- Diocese: North West Australia

Clergy
- Bishop: Darrell Parker
- Dean: Lachlan Edwards

Western Australia Heritage Register
- Official name: Anglican Cathedral of the Holy Cross
- Type: State Registered Place
- Criteria: 11.1., 11.2., 11.4., 12.1., 12.2., 12.3, 12.4., 12.5.
- Designated: 25 June 2004
- Reference no.: 13227

The Cathedral of the Holy Cross, Geraldton is a heritage-listed Anglican Cathedral in Geraldton, Western Australia. Consecrated in 1964, it is in active use, and is the cathedral church of the Anglican Diocese of North West Australia.

== History ==
When the Anglican Diocese of North West Australia was established in 1910, Broome was designated as the See town, with Geraldton still remaining part of the Diocese of Perth. Initial plans were to construct a cathedral in Broome, with the Anglican Church of the Annunciation serving as the pro-cathedral until a permanent cathedral could be built.

However, in 1928, Geraldton and its surrounding territories were transferred from the Diocese of Perth to the North West. Subsequently, the diocesan headquarters were moved from Broome to Geraldton in 1935. Later, following the formalisation of the diocesan boundaries by the WA Parliament through the Church of England (Northern Diocese) Act in 1961, and the first synod of the diocese, Geraldton replaced Broome as the diocesan See town.

=== Construction ===
In 1960–1961, plans were undertaken to establish a new cathedral in Geraldton. Architects Ean McDonald and Edwin Whitaker from Perth were commissioned for the design, and the contract for the construction was awarded to the Geraldton Building Company in 1962. The total cost of the project was approximately £80,000, including furnishings.

== Description ==
The cathedral is a rare and "...excellent example of the Post-War Ecclesiastical style of architecture featuring an unorthodox plan form, impressive monumentality, simple and functional finishings and decorative stained glass windows."

Additionally, the cathedral incorporates four stones from English churches: a stone from Westminster Abbey (1065), a stone from the Canterbury Cathedral (1070), a stone from the Lincoln Cathedral (1092), and marble from the reredos of St Paul's Cathedral (1697).

=== Stained Glass ===
The cathedral "is renowned for having one of the largest areas of stained glass windows in Australia." The windows were designed by Carl Edwards in London, and constructed locally in Western Australia by Gowers & Brown. It features seven windows each on the north and south side of the nave, and one window on the eastern wall of its upstairs chapel.

The seven windows on the north side of the cathedral depict the events of Christmas, Epiphany, the Crucifixion, Easter, Ascension, Pentecost and the Trinity.

The seven windows on the south side of the cathedral depict significant biblical and church history figures. Biblical figures depicted include Abraham, Moses, Isaiah, John the Baptist, Stephen and the apostle Paul. Figures from church history include Saint Alban, Augustine of Canterbury, and Saint Boniface; as well as figures important to the Anglican tradition including Thomas Cranmer, Richard Hooker, and George Herbert.

The east window located within the chapel is based on Genesis 1:1-3, depicting the creation of the heavens and the earth.

== Deans ==
The following individuals have served as Deans of the Cathedral of the Holy Cross:

No	Name	Start	End	Notes
1	Leslie Wilson	1964	1965	
2	Gerard Dickinson	1966	1969	
3	Brian Kyme	1969	1974	Later Assistant Bishop of Perth (1982–1999).
4	Eric Kerr	1975	1985	
5	Alan Lewis	1985	1989	
6	Dennis Reynolds	1989	1992	
7	Dennis Warburton	1992	1995	
8	Kenneth Rogers	1995	2002	
9	Jeremy Rice	2006	2014	
10	Peter Grice	2015	2020	Afterwards Bishop of Rockhampton (2021).
11	Lachlan Edwards	2022	Present	Previously Rector of Christ Church, Lavender Bay.

== Gallery ==
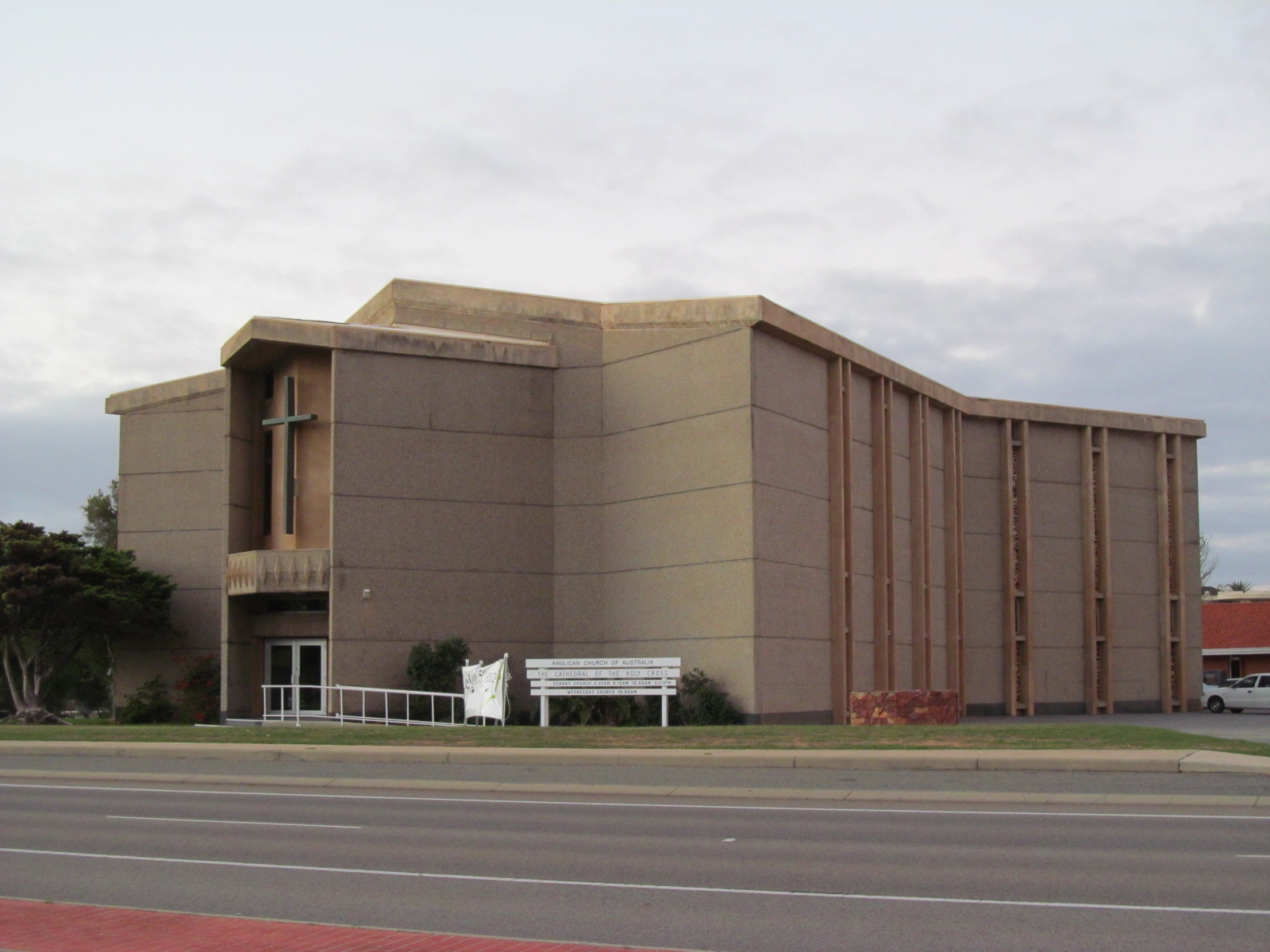
Front view of the cathedral.

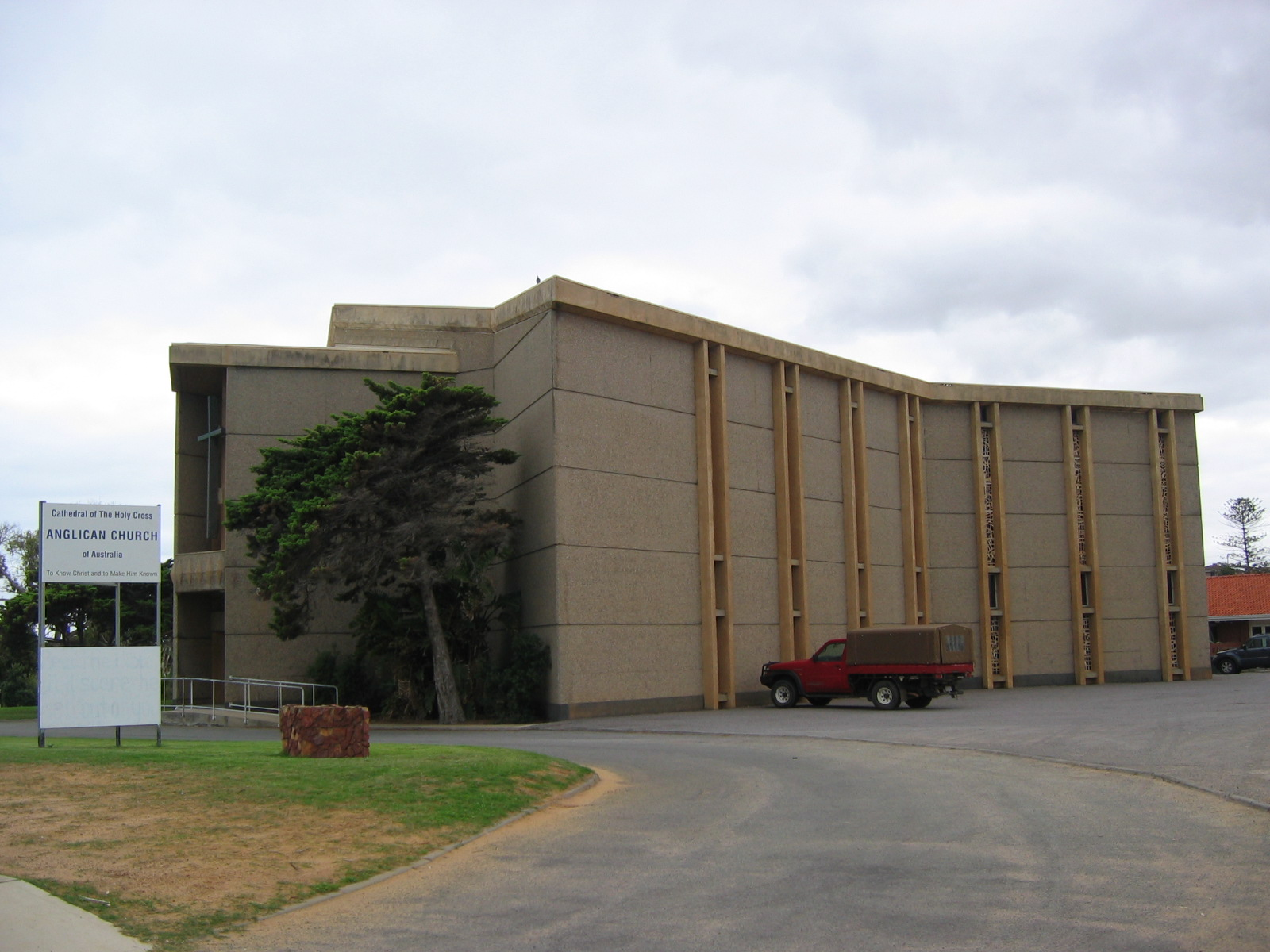
Southern side of the cathedral.

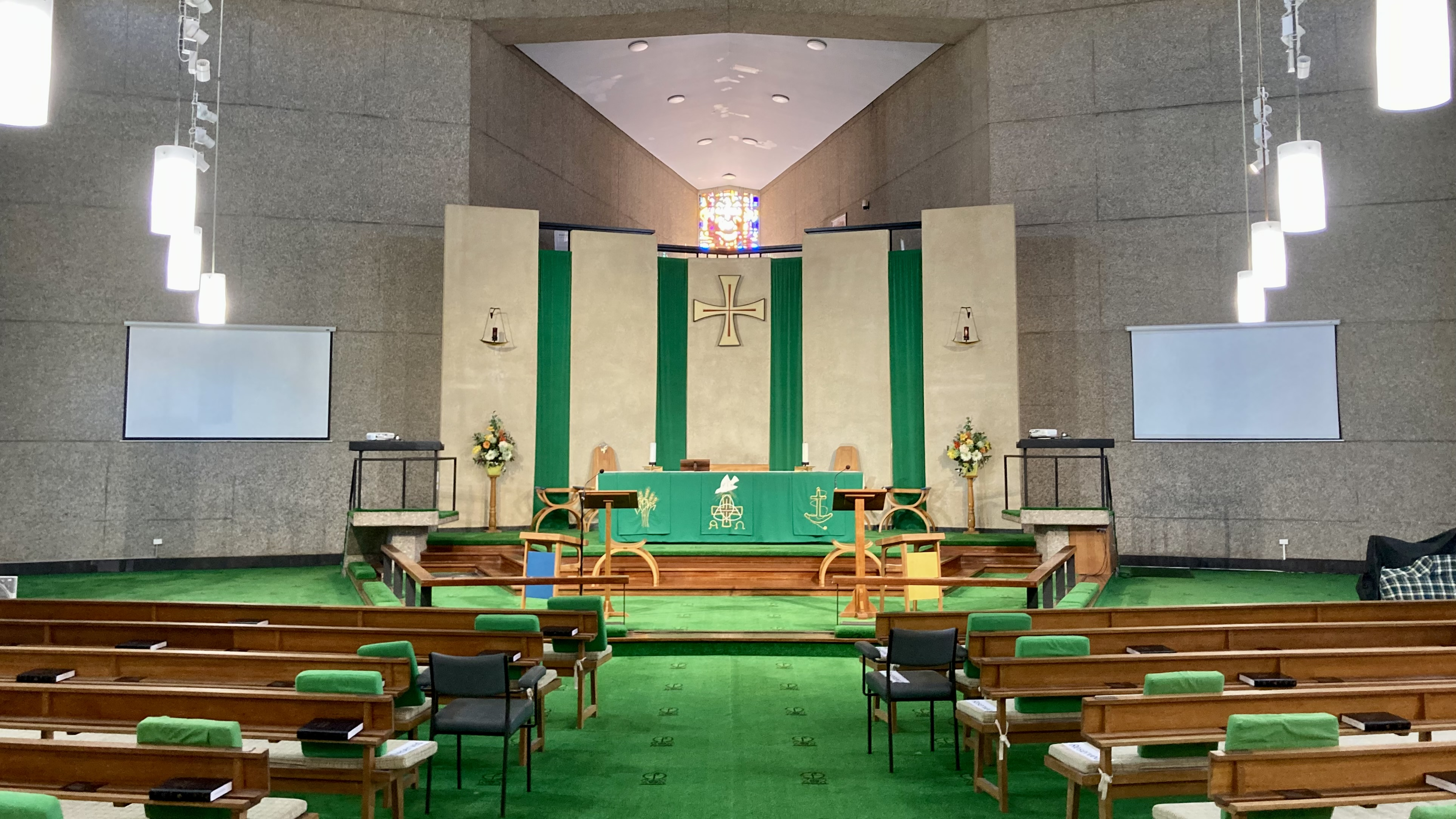
View from within the Nave facing East towards the Sanctuary.

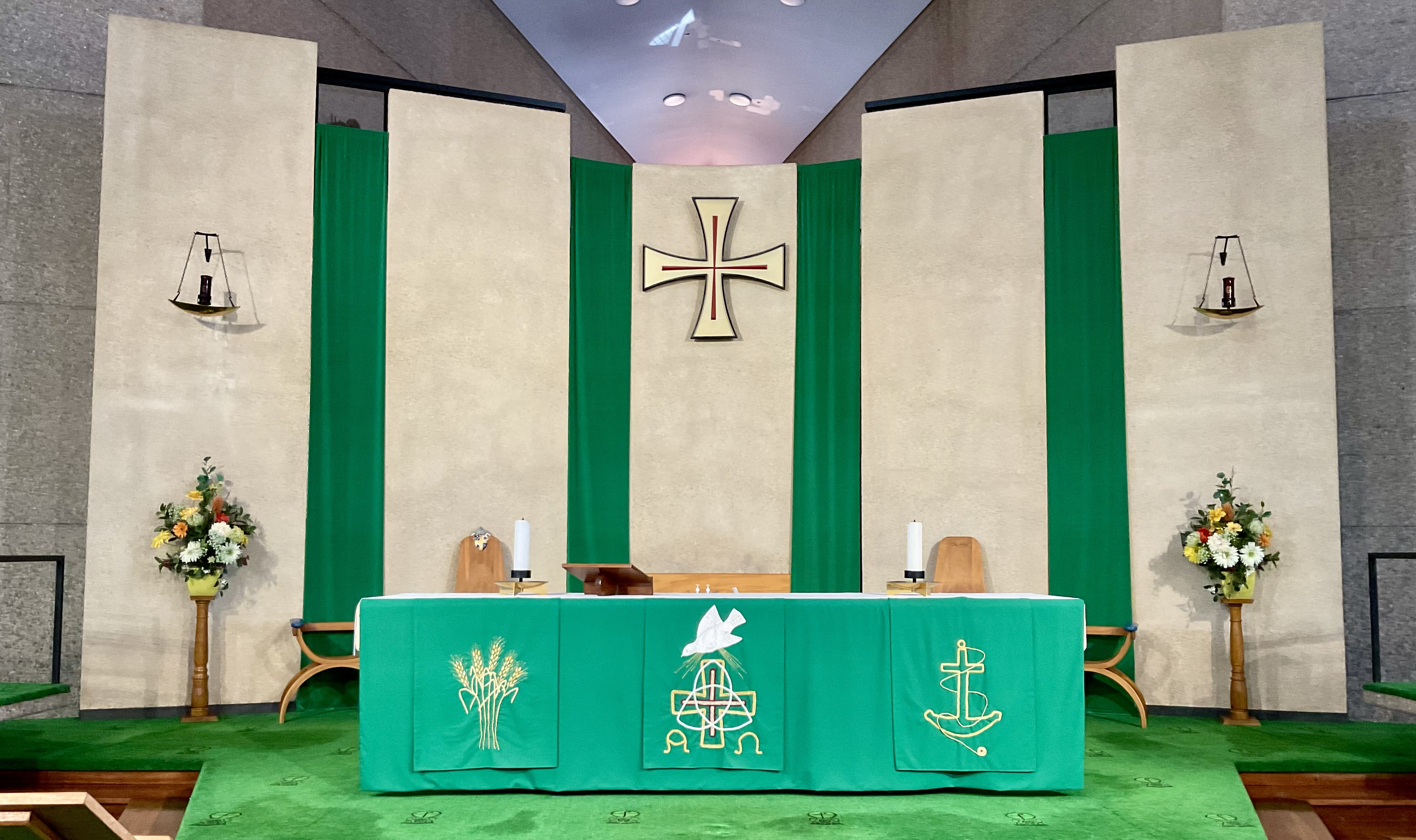
Sanctuary and communion table (decorated in Green for Ordinary Time).

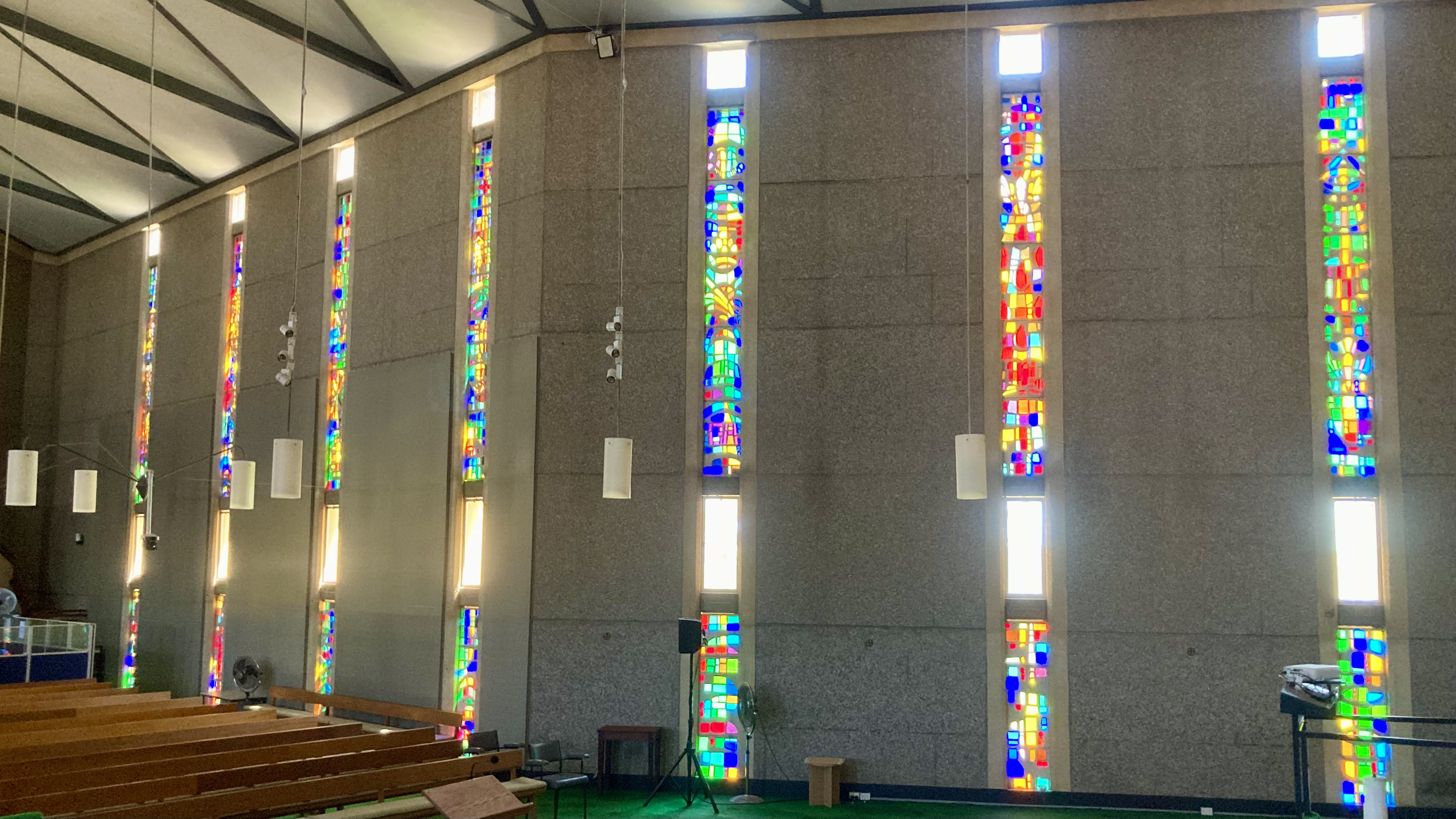
Northern wall with stained glass windows.

== See also ==
- Anglican Diocese of North West Australia
- Anglican Church of the Annunciation, Broome
- List of Anglican churches in Western Australia
