= David Mulready =

Australian Anglican bishop

The Right Reverend David Mulready
- Bishop of North West Australia
- Church: Anglican Church of Australia
- Diocese: North West Australia
- In office: 2003–2011
- Predecessor: Tony Nichols
- Successor: Gary Nelson
- Previous posts: Rector of St John's, Parramatta

Orders
- Consecration: 1 February 2004

Personal details
- Born: 13 September 1947 (age 79) Sydney, Australia
- Education: Newington College; Moore Theological College; Melbourne College of Divinity

David Gray Mulready (born 13 September 1947) is an Australian Anglican bishop and a former incumbent of the diocesan see of North West Australia, the largest diocese in geographical size in the Anglican Church of Australia, covering approximately a quarter of the Australian continent.

== Early life ==
Mulready was born in Sydney, the son of Norman Benson Mulready and Edna Faith Osborne. He grew up on the Northern Beaches in Curl Curl, New South Wales and attended Newington College (1960–1964). He became an airline trainee with Qantas before studying at Moore Theological College and the Melbourne College of Divinity. He holds a Licenciate of Theology and a Diploma of Religious Education.

== Ministry ==
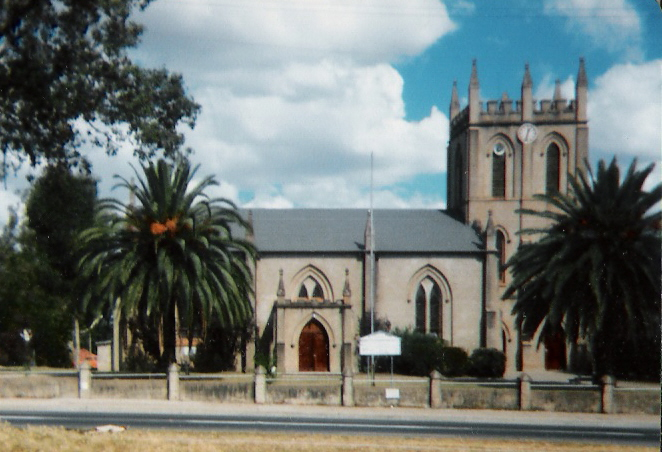
Mulready was Rector of St Stephen's Church, Penrith, from 1993 to 2000

Mulready's ordained ministry began in the Diocese of Sydney and he then served 15 years in the Diocese of Armidale. He worked in rural parish ministry in New South Wales and was posted to Tambar Springs (1974–1977), Walgett (1977–1981), Manilla (1981–1985) and Gunnedah (1985–1989). Mulready was the NSW State Secretary of the Bush Church Aid Society from 1989, after which he moved St Stephen's Church, Penrith (1993–2000). He then served as Rector of St John's, Parramatta (2000–2004) until he was elected Bishop of North-West Australia. Mulready was consecrated as bishop in February 2004. He retired in 2011.

== Family life ==
Mulready married Maureen Jane Lawrie in 1972 and is the father of two adult sons and a daughter.

Anglican Communion titles
Preceded by Tony Nichols	Bishop of North West Australia; 2003–2011	Succeeded by Gary Nelson
