= John Frewer =

Australian bishop (1883–1974)

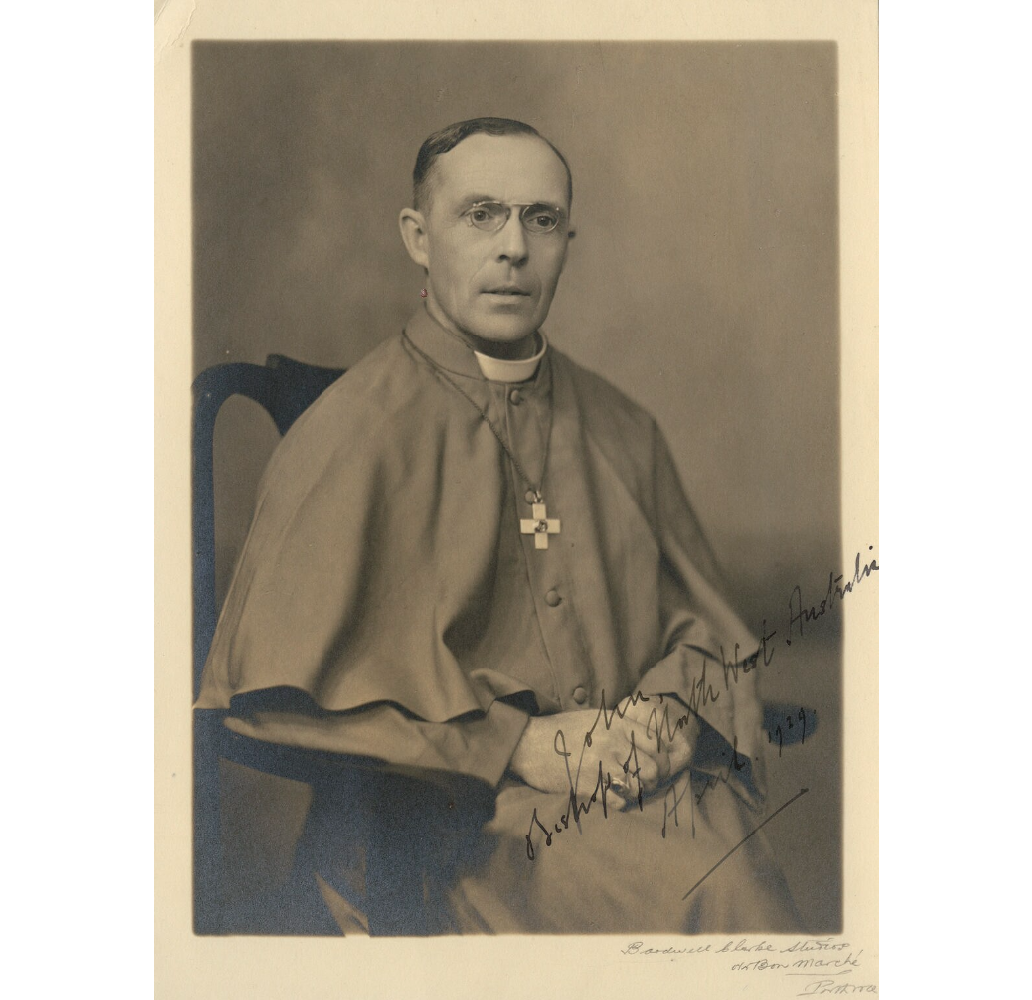

John Frewer CBE (1 November 1883 – 7 December 1974) was an Anglican bishop in Australia.

Frewer was born in Fulletby, Lincolnshire. He was educated at The King's School, Canterbury and Lincoln Theological College. He was ordained priest in 1909 and, after being a curate in Boston, Lincolnshire, he emigrated to Australia where he became domestic chaplain to the Bishop of Bunbury — eventually becoming a canon of the diocese. A member of the Brotherhood of St Boniface, he was their warden from 1919 until his ordination to the episcopate.

Frewer served as second Bishop of North West Australia from 1929 to 1965. He retired to Perth, Western Australia and died on 7 December 1974 at Mount Lawley, Perth, and was cremated; his ashes were placed in the Cathedral of the Holy Cross, Geraldton.

Anglican Communion titles
Preceded by Gerard Trower	Bishop of North West Australia; 1928–1965	Succeeded by Howell Witt
