= Ged Muston =

Australian Anglican bishop

Gerald Bruce "Ged" Muston (19 January 1927–10 January 2017) was an Australian Anglican bishop, who served as the Bishop of North West Australia from 1981 to 1992.

Muston was born in Sydney and educated at Moore Theological College. After his ordination in 1951 he had a position with the Church Missionary Society before becoming the rector of Tweed Heads, Rural Dean of Essendon and then Archdeacon of the Northern Territory before his ordination to the episcopate. He was an assistant bishop in the Diocese of Melbourne before becoming the Bishop of North West Australia.

Muston died in Perth on 10 January 2017.

Anglican Communion titles
Preceded by Howell Witt	Bishop of North West Australia; 1981–1992	Succeeded by Tony Nichols
