= Anglican Diocese of North West Australia =

Diocese of the Anglican Church of Australia

Diocese of North West Australia
- Coat of arms

Location
- Country: Australia
- Territory: Mid West; Gascoyne; Kimberley; Pilbara
- Ecclesiastical province: Western Australia
- Metropolitan: Archbishop of Perth
- Headquarters: 101 Cathedral Avenue; Geraldton WA 6530
- Coordinates: 28°46′44.1″S 114°36′52.6″E

Information
- Denomination: Anglican
- Established: 1910
- Cathedral: Cathedral of the Holy Cross, Geraldton
- Language: English

Current leadership
- Parent church: Anglican Church of Australia
- Bishop: Darrell Parker
- Dean: Lachlan Edwards; (since 2022)

Website
- Anglican Diocese of North West Australia
- Logo of the Diocese

The Anglican Diocese of North West Australia (known as the Anglican Diocese of Northern Australia until 1961) is a diocese of the Anglican Church of Australia, founded in 1910. It is situated in the northern part of the state of Western Australia.

As part of the Province of Western Australia, the diocese covers those parts of the state north of Perth including Geraldton, Karratha, Broome and Kununurra, and is geographically the largest Anglican diocese in Australia and the largest land-based diocese in the world. It has 18 parishes and three Mission to Seafarers’ ministries; its cathedral church is the Cathedral of the Holy Cross, Geraldton.

The incumbent bishop of the diocese is Darrell Parker, formerly vicar of St Paul's Tamworth. He was elected as the 8th bishop in September 2022, replacing Gary Nelson, who retired on 15 May 2022. Parker was consecrated in St Andrew's Cathedral, Sydney on 3 February 2023 and installed as bishop in the diocesan cathedral on 15 February 2023.

== History ==
The Anglican ministry in Western Australia has belonged to a series of dioceses, changing over time as Australia was colonised. In 1829, when the Swan River Colony was established, episcopal supervision was provided by the Diocese of Calcutta. This changed in 1836 to the newly formed Diocese of Australia, and then again in 1847 to the Diocese of Adelaide. It was only in 1856 that the ministry in Western Australia became independent, in the form of the Diocese of Perth.

This state of affairs continued until the start of the 20th century, when facing the difficulties of administrating such a large area, a report was published in 1903 saying:

it seems probable that ultimately Western Australia will contain four dioceses. A Missionary Diocese in the North, a Diocese of Perth, a Diocese of Kalgoorlie, and a South-Western Diocese.

In 1904, the Diocese of Bunbury was created; it assumed oversight of the North West in 1906. Then, in 1910, after the raising of £10,000, equivalent to A$1.56 million in 2022 (the minimum amount required for the endowment of a bishopric), the Diocese of Northern Australia was created.

The diocese's first bishop was Gerald Trower, who was enthroned in 1910 at St George's Church, Carnarvon, by Bishop Riley of Perth. Broome was the original seat of the diocese, from 1910 to 1965, with the Church of the Annunciation the pro-cathedral.

When the diocese was established, its southern most boundary extended down only as far south as Denham, in Shark Bay. In 1928, in an effort to provide the struggling diocese with more a stable base of operations, the boundaries between the North West, Perth, and Kalgoorlie dioceses were redrawn. The territories of Northampton, Geraldton, Greenough, and Mullewa-Yalgoo were granted from the Diocese of Perth, with Mount Magnet, Cue, Meekatharra, Wiluna and Sandstone from the Dioceses of Kalgoorlie.

The diocese became known by its present name in 1961.

== Structure ==
Geographically, the diocese is one of the largest Anglican dioceses in the world (the Diocese of the Arctic is the largest), covering 2 million square kilometres (0.77 million square miles) of Western Australia, the majority of which is above the 26th parallel of latitude.

The population of the area is about 150,000 people.

The diocese has 18 parishes and three Mission to Seafarers' ministries and the cathedral church of the diocese is the Cathedral of the Holy Cross, Geraldton, saying:

due to the fluid nature of our region, we're proud to be a 'missionary' diocese. We journey with everyone who comes and goes as part of work or tourism, and see a congregation turnover rate of around 100% every two years. Our region is dependent on support by individuals, parishes, dioceses, and Christian organisations across Australia who are committed to gospel ministry in small, remote, and isolated towns and communities in North West Australia.

== Cathedral ==
The cathedral church of the diocese is the Cathedral of the Holy Cross, Geraldton located in Cathedral Avenue, Geraldton.

The cathedral building was built in 1964 to a design by architects McDonald and Whitaker. It has a star shaped footprint and is said to resemble Coventry Cathedral in England. Internally, the cathedral has extensive stained glass and an organ built by Allen Organ Company.

The following individuals have served as Deans of the Cathedral of the Holy Cross:

| No | Name | Start | End | Notes |
|---|---|---|---|---|
| 1 | Leslie Wilson | 1964 | 1965 | |
| 2 | Gerard Dickinson | 1966 | 1969 | |
| 3 | Brian Kyme | 1969 | 1974 | Later Assistant Bishop of Perth (1982–1999). |
| 4 | Eric Kerr | 1975 | 1985 | |
| 5 | Alan Lewis | 1985 | 1989 | |
| 6 | Dennis Reynolds | 1989 | 1992 | |
| 7 | Dennis Warburton | 1992 | 1995 | |
| 8 | Kenneth Rogers | 1995 | 2002 | |
| 9 | Jeremy Rice | 2006 | 2014 | |
| 10 | Peter Grice | 2015 | 2020 | Afterwards Bishop of Rockhampton (2021). |
| 11 | Lachlan Edwards | 2022 | Present | Previously Rector of Christ Church, Lavender Bay. |

== List of bishops ==
=== Diocesan bishops ===
Bishops of Perth including North West Australia (until 1906)
| No | From | Until | Incumbent | Notes |
|---|---|---|---|---|
| 1 | 1857 | 1875 | Mathew Hale | Translated to Brisbane. |
| 2 | 1876 | 1893 | Henry Parry | Died in office. |
| 3 | 1894 | 1914 | Charles Riley | Became Archbishop of Perth. |
Bishop of Bunbury including North West Australia (until 1910)
| 1 | 1904 | 1917 | Frederick Goldsmith | Previously Dean of Perth; resigned and returned to England. |
Bishops of North West Australia
| 1 | 1910 | 1927 | Gerard Trower | Translated from Nyasaland. |
| 2 | 1928 | 1965 | John Frewer | Previously a canon of the Diocese of Bunbury. |
| 3 | 1965 | 1981 | Howell Witt | Translated to Bathurst. |
| 4 | 1981 | 1992 | Ged Muston | Previously an assistant bishop in the Diocese of Melbourne. |
| 5 | 1992 | 2003 | Tony Nichols | |
| 6 | 2003 | 2011 | David Mulready | |
| 7 | 2012 | 2022 | Gary Nelson | Installed 26 May 2012. Retired 15 May 2022. |
| 8 | 2023 | Present | Darrell Parker | Installed on 15 February 2023. Formerly Vicar of St Paul's, Tamworth, New South Wales. |

=== Assistant bishops ===
Bernard Buckland was Regional Bishop for The Kimberleys (assistant bishop) until his retirement on 14 March 1997.

== Churchmanship ==
The diocese is noted for its low church conservative Evangelical stance; no women serve as priests.

== Anglican realignment ==
The Diocese of North West Australia was the second in the Anglican Church of Australia, after the Anglican Diocese of Sydney, to recognize the Anglican Church in North America as a "member church of the Anglican Communion, in full communion with Diocese of North West Australia", according to a motion passed in October 2014.

== See also ==
- Anglican Diocese of Sydney
- Anglican Diocese of Tasmania
- Anglican Diocese of Armidale
- Anglican Pacifist Fellowship
- Church Missionary Society
- Anglicare
- Evangelical Anglicanism
- Low church
- Calvinism
- Fellowship of Confessing Anglicans
- GAFCON
