= Lasenby =

Lasenby is a surname. Notable people with the surname include:

- Jack Lasenby (1931–2019), New Zealand writer
- Joan Lasenby, British applied mathematician
- Paul Lasenby (born 1975), English cyclist

== See also ==
- Arthur Lasenby Liberty (1843–1917), British businessman
- Lazenby (disambiguation)
