= Gary Nelson (bishop) =

Australian Anglican bishop (born 1952)

The Right Reverend Gary Nelson
- Bishop of North West Australia
- Church: Anglican Church of Australia
- Province: Province of Western Australia
- Diocese: Diocese of North West Australia
- Installed: 26 May 2012
- Term ended: 15 May 2022
- Predecessor: David Mulready
- Successor: Darrell Parker

Orders
- Ordination: 1983 (as priest)
- Consecration: 14 April 2012 (St Andrew's Cathedral, Sydney) by Roger Herft

Personal details
- Born: Gary Neville Nelson; 15 May 1952 (age 74)
- Denomination: Anglicanism
- Spouse: Christine
- Education: University of Sydney; University of New South Wales; Moore Theological College

Gary Neville Nelson (born 15 May 1952) is an Australian Anglican bishop who served as Bishop of North West Australia (the largest diocese in geographical size in the Anglican Church of Australia, covering approximately a quarter of the Australian continent) from 26 May 2012 to 15 May 2022.

== Early life ==
He grew up in Western Sydney and trained as a teacher at Sydney University. He spent two years with his wife in Papua New Guinea as missionary teachers.

== Ministry ==
He was assistant curate in Dapto and later rector of Panania.

Nelson served as Director of External Studies at Moore Theological College from 2006 until his appointment as Bishop of North West Australia in 2012.

Nelson stated that in the event that same-sex marriage was legalised in Australia, if he believes that religious freedom is not adequately protected, he will refuse to register any marriages.

Nelson retired from the role of bishop on 15 May 2022, on reaching the retirement age of 70 years.

Anglican Communion titles
Preceded by David Mulready	Bishop of North West Australia; 2012–2022	Succeeded by Darrell Parker
