= List of State Register of Heritage Places in the City of Karratha =

The State Register of Heritage Places is maintained by the Heritage Council of Western Australia. As of 2026, 122 places are heritage-listed in the City of Karratha, of which 30 are on the State Register of Heritage Places.

== List ==
The Western Australian State Register of Heritage Places, as of 2026, lists the following 30 state registered places within the City of Karratha:

| Place name | Place # | Location | Suburb or town | Co-ordinates | Built | State registered | Notes | Photo |
|---|---|---|---|---|---|---|---|---|
| Cossack Town Site Precinct | 3239 | | Cossack | 20°40′48″S 117°11′24″E | 1870 | 21 April 2006 | Also referred to as Tien Tsin, Port Walcott and Butcher's Inlet; Western Australia's first pearling port, established in 1863 and a staging post during the gold rushes of the 1880s | |
| Cossack School (Ruins) | 3230 | 47 Perseverance Street | Cossack | 20°40′50″S 117°11′06″E | 1896 | 24 March 1992 | A typical government building of the late 1800s | |
| Cossack Cemetery | 3232 | Lots 422-423 Settlers Beach Road | Cossack | 20°40′27″S 117°11′35″E | | 24 March 1992 | An historically cemetery which includes a Japanese section | |
| Customs House & Bond Store | 2345 | Lot 442 Pearl Street | Cossack | 20°40′44″S 117°11′20″E | 1895 | 24 March 1992 | Designed by George Temple-Poole, built of local field stone; Became "The Strand" cafe in 1927, later used as a munitions store and a holiday house | |
| Galbraith's Store | 2344 | Lot 444 Pearl Street | Cossack | 20°40′40″S 117°11′16″E | 1890 | 24 March 1992 | A large stone warehouse-store, re-roofed with corrugated metal sheeting | |
| Jarman Island Lighthouse & Quarters | 2337 | Jarman Island | Cossack | 20°39′31″S 117°13′02″E | 1888 | 12 May 2000 | Consists of the lighthouse and the ruined keepers quarters | |
| Jarman Island Lighthouse | 25070 | Jarman Island | Cossack | 20°39′28″S 117°13′03″E | | | Part of Jarman Island Lighthouse & Quarters Precinct (2337); A typical of cast iron towers of the late nineteenth century | |
| Jarman Island Quarters | 25071 | | Cossack | 20°39′31″S 117°13′02″E | | | Part of Jarman Island Lighthouse & Quarters Precinct (2337); Designed by George Temple-Poole, now a ruin | |
| Land Backed Wharf | 3231 | Lot 446 Cossack Road | Cossack | 20°40′47″S 117°11′20″E | 1894 | 24 March 1992 | Constructed of stone | |
| The Old Court House | 2346 | Lots 106-107 Pearl Street | Cossack | 20°40′41″S 117°11′18″E | 1885 | 24 March 1992 | A stone building with a metal roof and large masonry piers supporting a verandah on all four sides | |
| Police Quarters, Lockup & Service Buildings | 3229 | between Perseverance Street & Cossack Road | Cossack | 20°40′43″S 117°11′21″E | 1890 | 24 March 1992 | Complex consists of a single storey building constructed of stone with metal roof, the Police Quarters, Lockup, Cookhouse and toilets | |
| Cookhouse | 4018 | Perseverance Street | Cossack | 20°40′43″S 117°11′21″E | 1898 | | Part of Police Quarters, Lockup & Service Buildings Precinct (3229) | |
| Three Toilets | 4019 | Perseverance Street | Cossack | 20°40′43″S 117°11′21″E | 1898 | | Part of Police Quarters, Lockup & Service Buildings Precinct (3229) | |
| Post and Telegraph Office | 2347 | Corner Pearl & Perseverance Street | Cossack | 20°40′43.1″S 117°11′19.7″E | 1884 | 24 March 1992 | The oldest building in town, two-storeyed, with a metal roof and was constructed from local shell limestone | |
| Kitchen | 4016 | Corner Pearl Street & The Strand | Cossack | 20°40′43″S 117°11′20″E | 1884 | | Part of Post and Telegraph Office Precinct (2347) | |
| Service Building | 4017 | Corner Pearl Street & The Strand | Cossack | 20°40′43″S 117°11′20″E | 1884 | | Part of Post and Telegraph Office Precinct (2347) | |
| Registrar's Office and Residence | 3233 | Pearl Street | Cossack | 20°40′45″S 117°11′19″E | 1895 | 24 March 1992 | Also referred to as North-West Mercantile Store and Office (former) | |
| Mercantile Store (ruins) | 8675 | | Cossack | 20°40′45″S 117°11′19″E | 1895 | | Part of Registrar's Office and Residence Precinct (3233); Also referred to as North West Mercantile Store | |
| Cooya Pooya Station | 3376 | 35 km South of Roebourne | Cooya Pooya | 21°02′02″S 117°08′20″E | 1882 | 2 September 1998 | Also referred to as Cooapooey, Lockyer Station and Table Hill Station; Homestead with stone walls, surrounding verandahs, an example of North-West vernacular architecture; The freestone shearers’ kitchen building is an exceptional example of stone construction | |
| Roebourne Police Station, Gaol & Court House Precinct | 2319 | Bounded by Queen, Hampton & Victoria Street and Carnarvon Terrace | Roebourne | 20°46′40″S 117°08′40″E | 1886 | 20 October 1995 | A rare example of a complex where a police station, court house and gaol are contained upon the one site | |
| Roebourne Courthouse | 25072 | Lot 785 Queen Street | Roebourne | 20°46′42″S 117°08′38″E | 1886 | | Part of Roebourne Police Station, Gaol & Court House Precinct (2319); The oldest functioning court house in Western Australia | |
| Roebourne Gaol | 25074 | 786 Carnarvon Terrace | Roebourne | 20°46′43″S 117°08′40″E | 1896 | | Part of Roebourne Police Station, Gaol & Court House Precinct (2319) | |
| Roebourne Police Station (1896) | 25073 | Lot 785 Queen Street | Roebourne | 20°46′40″S 117°08′43″E | 1896 | | Part of Roebourne Police Station, Gaol & Court House Precinct (2319) | |
| Dalgety House | 13254 | 48 Roe Street | Roebourne | 20°46′30″S 117°08′47″E | 1892 | 11 August 2009 | A single-storey timber framed, corrugated iron clad residence in the North-West vernacular style; Associated with pastoral and agricultural company Dalgety & Co. | |
| Holy Trinity Anglican Church | 2332 | Hampton Street | Roebourne | 20°46′49″S 117°08′39″E | 1895 | 29 September 1998 | Built in vernacular style, with Victorian Romanesque elements; Oldest church in the Pilbara district and the only stone church in the region | |
| Roebourne Hospital Group | 2339 | 51-61 Hampton Street | Roebourne | 20°46′35″S 117°08′38″E | 1887 | 30 June 2014 | Also referred to as West Pilbara Health Service; The second purpose-built public hospital to be constructed in Western Australia; The first, and one of the few surviving, Bungalow Hospitals in Western Australia; One of George Temple-Poole's earliest design works | |
| Mount Welcome House | 2343 | 64 Hampton Road | Roebourne | 20°46′41″S 117°08′35″E | 1864 | 31 October 1998 | A good example of North-West vernacular architecture | |
| Roebourne Primary School & Quarters (former) | 2341 | 54 Hampton Street | Roebourne | 20°46′34″S 117°08′35″E | 1891 | 30 August 2002 | Also referred to as Yaadina Babies and Children's Centre; The first school opened in northern Western Australia and the oldest extant school building in the region | |
| Roebourne Post Office | 2334 | 69 Sholl Street | Roebourne | 20°46′34″S 117°08′43″E | 1887 | 2 September 1998 | An early work of George Temple-Poole | |
| De Grey - Mullewa Stock Route No. 9701 | 5113 | Through Woodenooka & Tallering Peak from Mullewa | | | 1870 | 7 December 2022 | Also referred to as De Gray Mullewa Stock Route; A 1,500 kilometre stock route from Mullewa to just east of the De Grey River, near Port Hedland | |
