= George Lazenby (cabinetmaker) =

Western Australian pioneer (1807–1895)

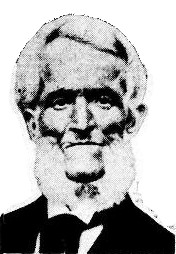
- 1930 reprint of an earlier photo.
- Born: October 1807; Spalding, Lincolnshire, United Kingdom
- Died: June 13, 1895 (aged 87–88); Perth, Western Australia
- Occupation(s): Cabinetmaker, Methodist preacher, public servant
- Children: Hannah Boyd Hall (née Lazenby); Jane Wesley Rowe (née Lazenby)

George Lazenby (October 1807 – June 9, 1895) was an early settler of Western Australia, known for his cabinetmaking business and for being a Methodist preacher. A native of Spaldington in the north of England, he visited the Swan River Colony on his brother's ship in 1831 (travelling to benefit his health) and emigrated there soon after, arriving on the Cygnet in January 1833. He was superintendent of the first sunday school in the Colony. In the 1860s he built a house at Cardup, and established a flour mill and brick works—the latter continued in operation until the 1990s.

His elder daughter (of ten children) Hannah Boyd Lazenby married William Shakespeare Hall on 2 November 1868, and his younger daughter Jane Wesley Lazenby married Samuel John Rowe (son of Sub-Inspector of Police Thomas Rowe) on 21 January 1883; one of their sons was J. P. Durack. Another daughter married W. T. King.

Lazenby died in June 1895 at his residence in Lake Street, Perth, and he was buried in the East Perth Cemeteries on 13 June.
