= Roland Lazenby =

American sportswriter and educator

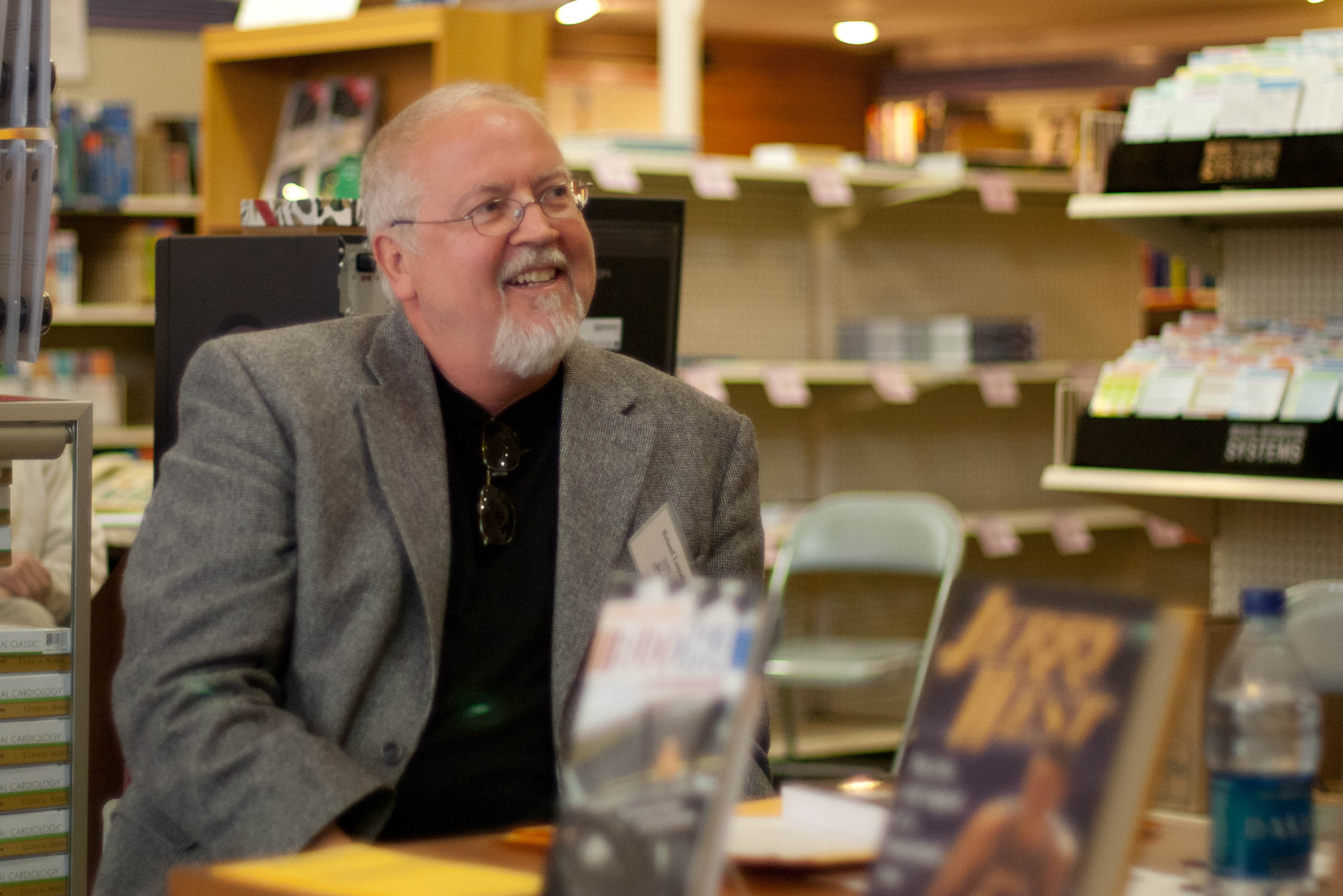
Lazenby in 2010.

Roland Lazenby is an American sportswriter and educator.

== Biography ==
Lazenby has written more than five dozen nonfiction books, mainly about basketball and American football. He has also contributed articles to magazines and newspapers.

Lazenby's book Bull Run! was named Sports Book of the Year for 1997 by the Independent Publishers Association.

His book, Michael Jordan. The Life, was named Sports Book of the Year 2015 in the Polish Sports Book Awards (Sportowa Książka Roku).

Lazenby studied at Virginia Military Institute and Hollins University, and has been a member of Virginia Tech's Department of Communication and Radford University's School of Communication. A group of students from his media writing class compiled the book April 16th: Virginia Tech Remembers (2007), an account of the Virginia Tech massacre. Lazenby served as editor.

In 2005, Lazenby and Andrew Mager created Planet Blacksburg, a student organization focused on new media, journalism, and publishing.

In April 2017, Lazenby redefined the term "coaching tree" - expanding it to include anyone who has ever played under said coach.

In October 2023, Lazenby's newest biography, Magic: The Life of Earvin "Magic" Johnson was published by Celadon Books.

== Written works ==
- Fifty Years of the Final Four: Golden Moments of the NCAA basketball tournament (1987)
- The Lakers: A Basketball Journey (1993)
- Bull Run! The Story of the 1995-96 Chicago Bulls (1996)
- Blood on the Horns: The Long Strange Ride of Michael Jordan's Chicago Bulls (1998)
- Mad Game, The NBA Education of Kobe Bryant (2000)
- Mindgames: Phil Jackson's Long Strange Journey (2001)
- Johnny Unitas: The Best There Ever Was (2002)
- Tom Brady: Sudden Glory (2002)
- The Show: The Inside Story of the Spectacular Los Angeles Lakers in the Words of Those Who Lived It (2004)
- Jerry West: The Life and Legend of a Basketball Icon (2010)
- Michael Jordan: The Life (2014)
- Showboat: The Life of Kobe Bryant (2016)
- Magic: The Life of Earvin "Magic" Johnson (2023)
