= Anglican Church of the Annunciation, Broome =

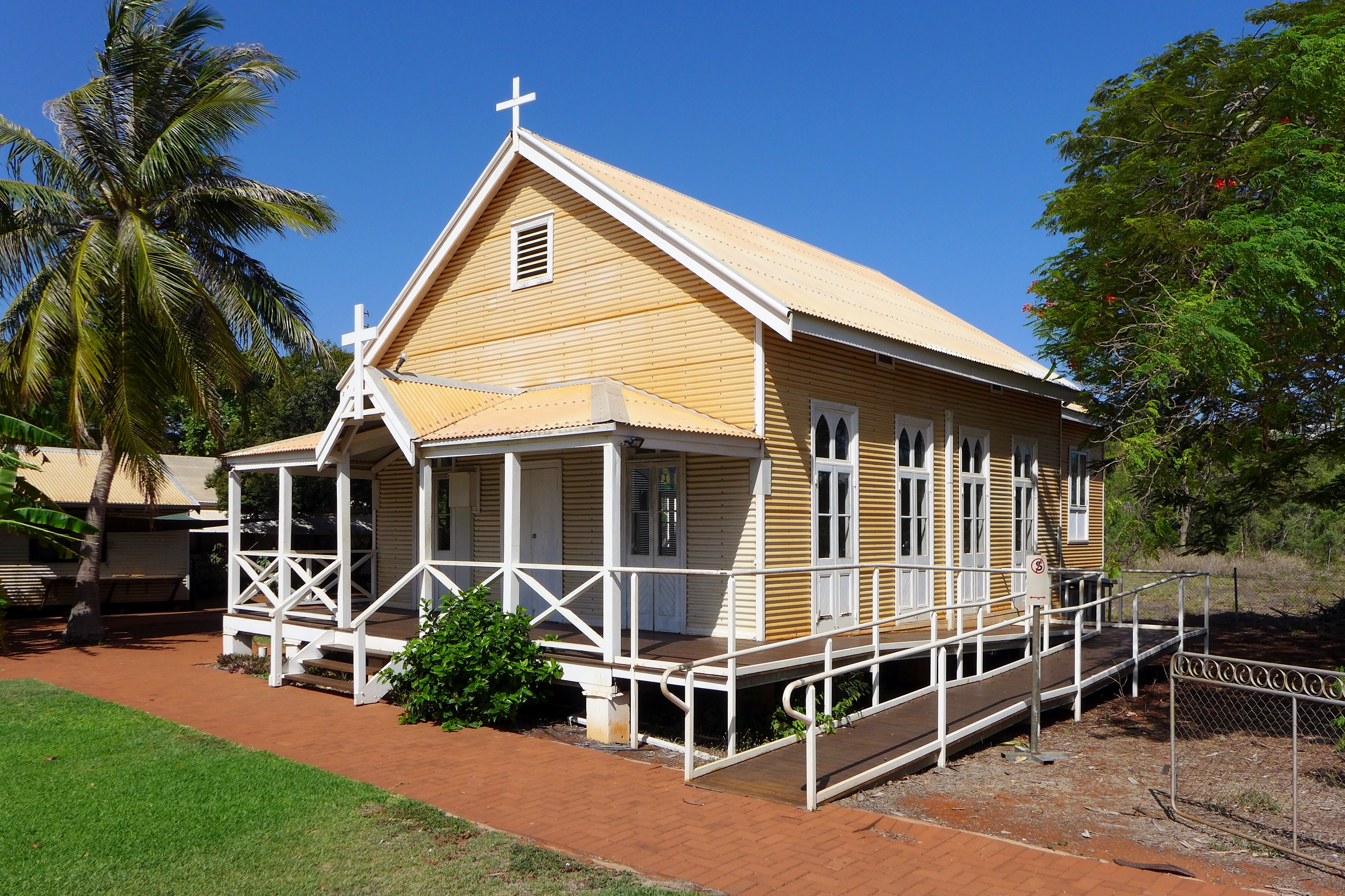
- The church in 2019
- Anglican Church of the Annunciation, Broome
- 17°57′38″S 122°14′27″E
- Location: 21 Hamersley Street, Broome, Western Australia
- Country: Australia
- Denomination: Anglican Church of Australia
- Previous denomination: Church of England
- Website: Broome Anglican Church

History
- Status: Church
- Founded: 12 April 1903
- Consecrated: 12 June 1903

Architecture
- Functional status: Active
- Style: Federation Carpenter Gothic
- Years built: 1903
- Construction cost: £300+

Administration
- Province: Western Australia
- Diocese: North West Australia
- Parish: Broome

Western Australia Heritage Register
- Official name: Anglican Church of the Annunciation
- Type: State Registered Place
- Criteria: 11.1., 11.2., 11.4., 12.2., 12.3, 12.4., 12.5.
- Designated: 2 September 1997
- Reference no.: 297

The Anglican Church of the Annunciation is a historic church in Broome, Western Australia. Also known as the Pro Cathedral of the Annunciation and The Little White Church, the wood and corrugated iron structure was opened in 1903, and has been continually used as a church.

== Description ==
The church is a single-storey building with a timber frame and corrugated iron cladding. The gable roof is also made from corrugated iron. There is a verandah at the front, and the building is raised up from the ground, sitting on concrete stumps. The rectory is located to the north, adjacent to the building. The bell tower is located south of the church, as of 2019; previously it was behind the church to the north.

== History ==
Broome was established in 1883, and initially only had infrequent Anglican services from the Roebourne parish. In the early 1900s, the rise of Broome's pearling industry started an economic boom, and as a result an Anglican church was needed to serve the town. The community began organising and fundraising in 1902, and decided on the name, Church of the Annunciation, at a special general meeting of the parishioners of the newly constituted parochial district of Broome. More than £300 was raised in three months, and by December tenders had been accepted to build the church, with building materials sourced from Fremantle. The church opened the next year on Easter Day, 12 April 1903, and was consecrated on 12 June by Bishop Riley.

Broome became the seat of the North West Diocese in 1910, which made the Church of the Annunciation the pro-cathedral. In 1965, with Broome's population decreasing, the diocese moved its headquarters to Geraldton, with the church assigned to the Derby parish.

The church has survived various cyclones, the 1944 Japanese attack on Broome, and the low points of Broome's boom-and-bust cycle. Repairs were made several times since the 1970s. French doors were replaced with hopper windows in 1973; the walls, roof and ceiling were repaired in 1976; likewise the belfry in 1985; and further work on the ceiling and floors in 1990. The latest repairs in 2019 involved replacing termite-damaged exterior panels, relocating the bell tower, and heritage restorations, including painting the building its original white colour, from which it derived the colloquial name The Little White Church.

The church was given a permanent entry on the Register of the National Estate on 18 April 1989, listed on the State Register of Heritage Places on 2 September 1997, and added to the Shire of Broome Municipal Inventory on 28 August 2014.

=== Church bell ===
The church has a 250-kilogram (550 lb) bronze bell in its bell tower. It was cast in 1902 by John Taylor and Company, well-known founders in Loughborough, England, who also cast the 16,800 kilograms (37,000 lb) Great Paul bell for St Paul's Cathedral in London, the largest bell in Britain from 1881 to 2012. It arrived in 1902, donated by Siebe Gorman of Siebe Gorman and Co, a successful manufacturer and supplier for the pearl-diving industry. Their rival, Heinke and Co, donated the church's "magnificent organ". The impressive, expensive gifts are evidence of the wealth in Broome at the time. The bell's origin was rediscovered by a carpenter working on the 2019 renovation and relocation of the bell tower.
