= Westminster Presbyterian Church of Australia =

Westminster Presbyterian Church
- Abbreviation: WPC
- Classification: Protestant
- Orientation: Calvinism
- Theology: Reformed Evangelical
- Governance: Presbyterian
- Origin: 1970; Perth

The Westminster Presbyterian Church is a small but growing Presbyterian denomination in Australia. It is based in Western Australia, New South Wales and Queensland, and has one congregation in the Australian Capital Territory.

== History ==
The Westminster Presbyterian Church grew from informal Bible study meetings organized in Perth in 1970 by Rev David Cross, who had been sent to Western Australia by World Presbyterian Missions, the mission arm of the Reformed Presbyterian Church, Evangelical Synod in the United States, to work among Aboriginal people in the country town of Brookton. When that work did not progress as expected, David Cross came to Perth and commenced work among the people of that city at the request of local Presbyterians who were unhappy with developments in their own denomination.

The original Bible study work quickly grew into the first established church of a new denomination, which initially moved between several suburbs in the north-east of Perth before settling on a permanent home in the suburb of Maida Vale under the leadership of Rev Derek Jones. In 1976 a second congregation commenced in the suburb of Bull Creek, this time under the personal leadership of David Cross, and in time this congregation grew to become the largest in the denomination. In 1979, Rev Peter Adamson commenced a third congregation in the south-eastern suburb of Kelmscott. In the meantime, the original work of David Cross at Brookton bore some results in that the Aboriginal congregation he had worked with organized themselves as Calvary Presbyterian Church and joined the emerging denomination.

Support for the new denomination by World Presbyterian Missions continued throughout the 1970s as David Cross worked under their auspices. In 1981 their involvement was expanded through the provision of a second worker, Rev Oliver Claassen, who commenced the first congregation outside Western Australia, at Redbank Plains, a suburb of Ipswich, Queensland. In 1982 overseas support was taken over by Mission to the World, the mission arm of the Presbyterian Church in America, with the merger of the RPCES into the larger denomination.

In May 2019, the 23rd National Assembly met in Armadale, Western Australia, and was attended by over 30 delegates representing churches in Queensland, Western Australia, New South Wales and the ACT, as well as delegates from a growing partnership with Westminster Presbyterian Church Myanmar.

== Theology ==
The church describes itself as confessional, Reformed and Presbyterian.

The Bible is the supreme standard of the denomination, and is regarded as the only infallible rule of faith and life. The Westminster Confession of Faith is accepted as expressing the system of doctrine taught in the Bible and is the subordinate standard of the denomination. The form of the Westminster Confession of Faith adhered to is that adopted by the Orthodox Presbyterian Church and the Presbyterian Church in America.

== See also ==
- List of Presbyterian and Reformed denominations in Australia
- Presbyterian church governance
