= Darrell Parker =

Australian Anglican bishop (born 1952)

The Right Reverend Darrell Parker
- Bishop of North West Australia
- Church: Anglican Church of Australia
- Province: Province of Western Australia
- Diocese: Diocese of North West Australia
- Installed: 15 February 2023
- Predecessor: Gary Nelson

Orders
- Consecration: 3 February 2023 (St Andrew's Cathedral, Sydney) by Kanishka Raffel

Personal details
- Born: Darrell Maurice Parker
- Denomination: Anglicanism
- Spouse: Elizabeth
- Education: Moore Theological College

Darrell Maurice Parker is an Australian Anglican bishop who has served as Bishop of North West Australia (the largest diocese in geographical size in the Anglican Church of Australia, covering approximately a quarter of the Australian continent) since 15 February 2023.

Parker grew up in southern New South Wales, and studied at Moore Theological College. Prior to his consecration as bishop, Parker served for 25 years in the Anglican Diocese of Armidale, serving in the parishes of Walcha, Boggabilla, Tenterfield, and the St Mark’s Chapel at the University of New England. His final role prior to being appointed bishop was serving six years as Vicar of West Tamworth. He was also appointed Archdeacon of the MacIntyre, New England, and the Peel within the diocese.

Parker was consecrated as bishop on 3 February 2023 by Archbishop of Sydney Kanishka Raffel, and installed as Bishop of North West Australia on 15 February 2023.

Parker is married to Elizabeth and has four children.

Anglican Communion titles
Preceded by Gary Nelson	Bishop of North West Australia; 2023–	Incumbent
