= Howell Witt =

Australian Anglican bishop (1920–1998)

Howell Arthur John Witt (12 July 1920 – 8 July 1998) was an Australian Anglican bishop for over 25 years who served two very different dioceses. During his time as Bishop of North West Australia, he published his memoir, entitled Bush Bishop. and Witt’s End in 1981. He subsequently served as Bishop of Bathurst from 1981 to 1989.

Witt was born in Newport, Wales, where his father worked as a docker. He was educated at Leeds University and the College of the Resurrection in Mirfield. Ordained deacon in 1944 and priest in 1945, after curacies at Usk (1944–48) and St George', Camberwell (1948–49) he emigrated to Australia where he became chaplain at the Woomera Rocket Station, South Australia (1949–54). While at Woomera, Howell gave the first performance of his drag act, "the Dowager Duchess of Dingo Creek". After this, he was rector of St Mary Magdalene's Adelaide (1954–57) and then Elizabeth (1957–65).

A hugely colourful character, in 1965 he was ordained to the episcopate as Anglican Bishop of North West Australia and was often featured in the media. He was later translated to serve as Bishop of Bathurst from 1981 to 1989 and in that role was reported to be "bumbling, inappropriate, and adventurous to the end".

Anglican Communion titles
Preceded by John Frewer	Bishop of North West Australia; 1965–1981	Succeeded by Ged Muston
Preceded by Ken Leslie	7th Bishop of Bathurst; 1981–1989	Succeeded by Bruce Wilson
