= William Shakespeare Hall =

Pioneer settler of the Swan River Colony

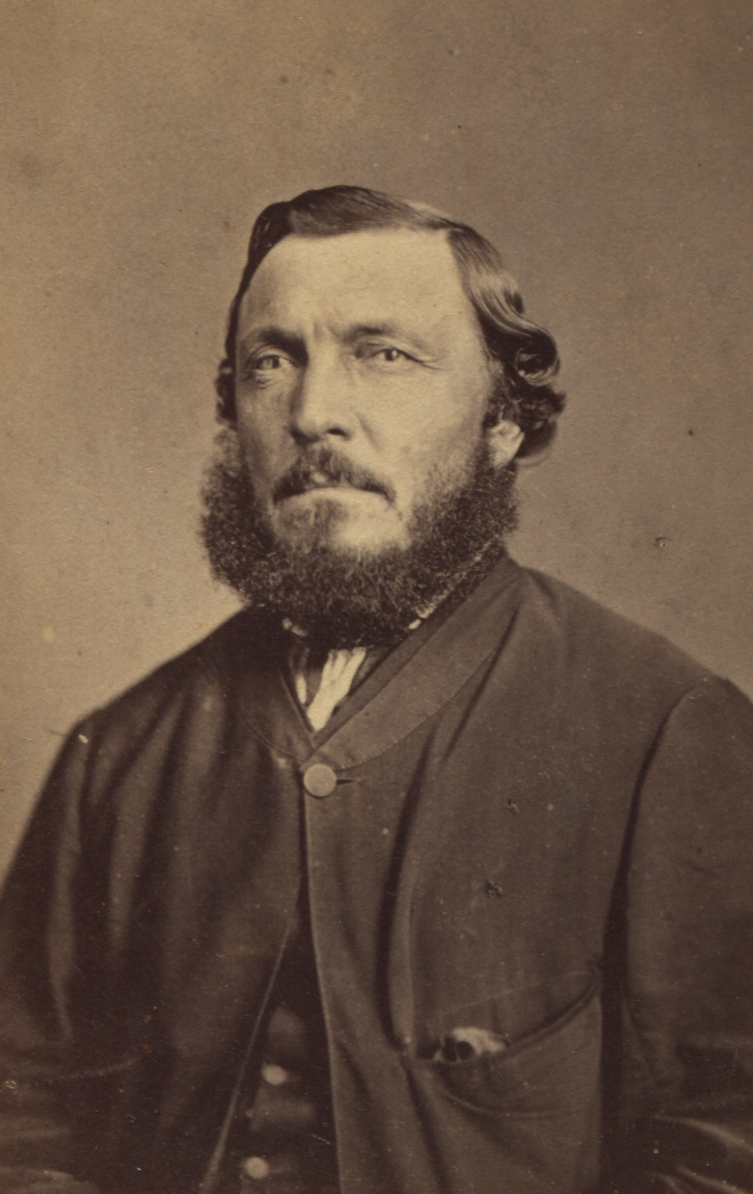
- Born: 25 December 1825; Lambeth, England
- Died: February 11, 1895 (aged 69); Cossack, Western Australia
- Resting place: Cossack, Western Australia
- Occupations: pastoralist, pearler
- Known for: early settler, pastoralist, development of North West of Western Australia
- Partner: Hannah Boyd Lazenby (1849–1911)
- Children: 5

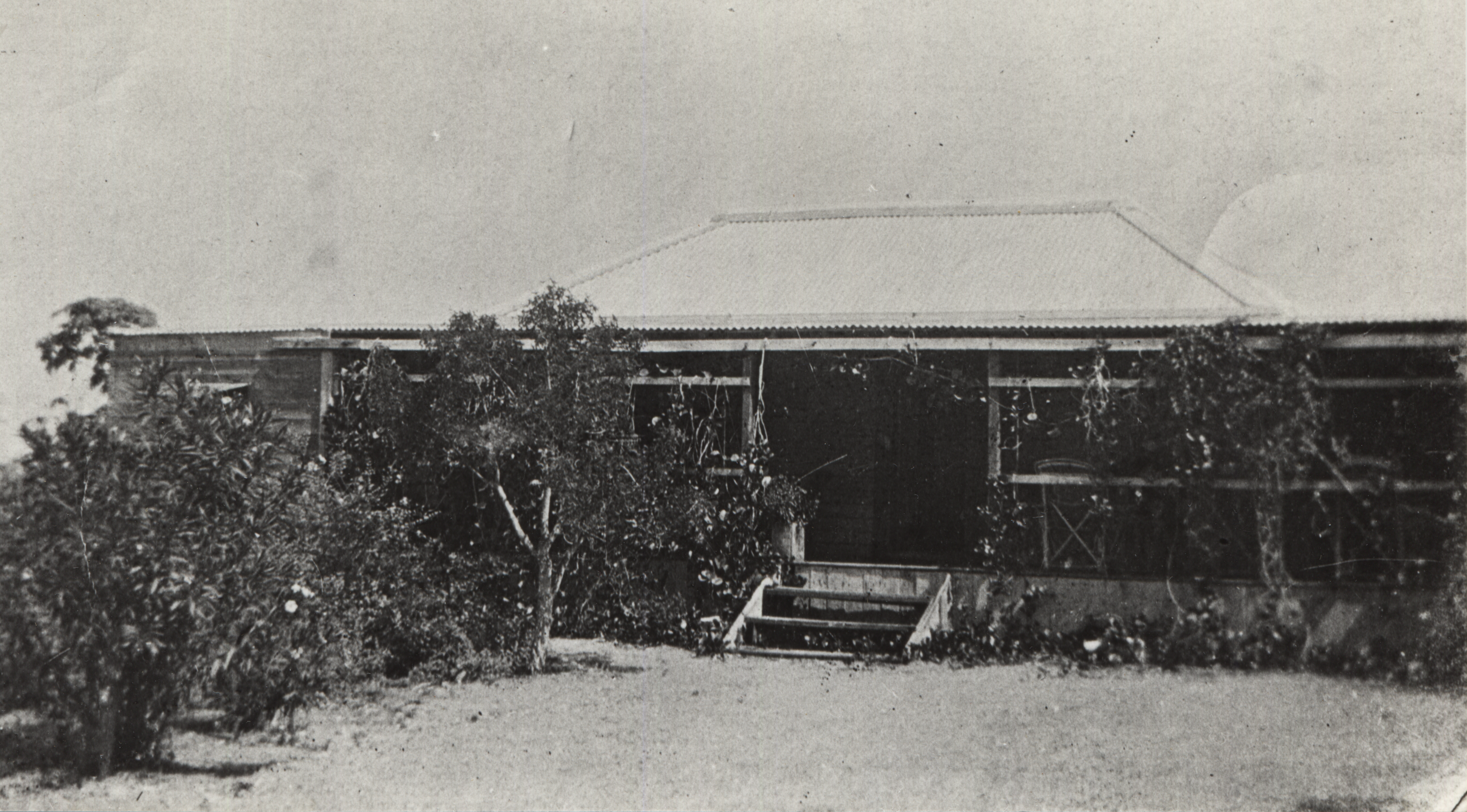
The Hall family house at Cossack.

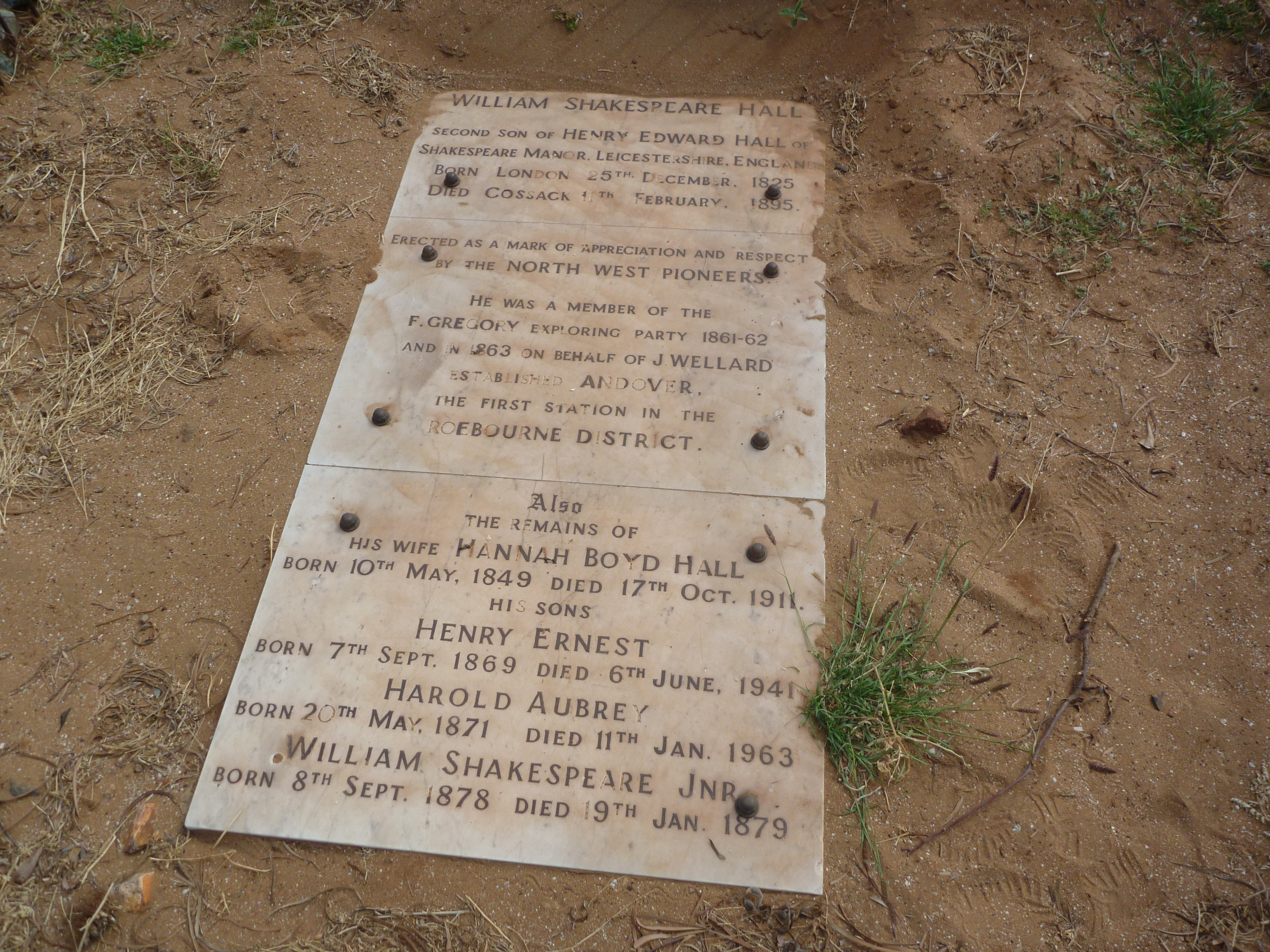
Hall's gravestone in Cossack Cemetery—note reference to Andover

William Shakespeare Hall (1825–1895) was a pioneer settler of the Swan River Colony and a well-known justice of the peace, explorer, pastoralist, and pearler. He was also known by some as 'the father of the north'.

He was born in London to Henry Edward and Sarah Theodosia. When the family sold Shackerstone Manor he emigrated with his parents and five siblings to Western Australia. They arrived in Fremantle in February 1830 on board Protector.

The family received two land grants—of 16,594 acres (6,715 ha) and 200 acres (81 ha)—at Mandurah and the locality of Hall's Head is named after them, though their attempt at developing the land was a failure. They built a house, Halls Cottage, on the smaller parcel of land and as of 2014 this was believed to be the only extant settler's building in the Mandurah area. While in the Murray district, Hall became known for building relationships with the local indigenous people, including learning their language, a characteristic that would later be instilled in his son Aubrey.

In 1835 it became apparent that the land around Mandurah was not suitable for the type of farming that they wished to undertake, so the large-holding was sold and the family moved to Perth in 1836 where Hall attended John Burdett Wittenoom's nascent grammar school. At this point his father returned to England to sell the family estate at Shackerstone, returning with Hall's elder brother. Farmland was then purchased at Wongong, to the east of Fremantle, and Hall lived here and farmed until 1852, when at the age of 27 he went to the Victorian goldfields.

He returned to Western Australia eight years later, and soon after joined Francis Thomas Gregory's expedition exploring the north-west in 1861. After this he returned to Wongong, but before long left again: in 1863 he took up the first sheep station, John Wellard's Andover, in the Roebourne district. Here, he again demonstrated cordial relations with the indigenous people, notably 'King Mulangom'. He remained there as manager of the station for two years, before returning to Perth. But again he didn't stay long, as he was offered the position of manager of the Roebuck Bay Company, and so moved north to that location. Here he was appointed to be the government's Justice of the Peace for that region. The Roebuck Bay settlement not being a success, the whole company moved to Roebourne and the port of Cossack. Hall resigned his justice-ship in 1867, but his letter of resignation went down when the ship Emma was wrecked and it is not known if he ever rectified this.

Also in 1867 (in March and April) he travelled in the area of the Yule River.

On 2 June 1868 he arrived in Fremantle on the cutter Albert, which was carrying a cargo of wool and perl shell, and on 2 November that year he married Hannah Lazenby (daughter of George Lazenby) in Cardup and took her back to live in Cossack. He gave up trying to farm, and turned instead to shopkeeping for a short time, before the pearling industry began to develop in the region and he put to sea with a crew of 'Malay' pearl divers. With this he was successful, but when he soon gave up the ships and stayed ashore as a pearl trader, he was less so, and before long was back buying ships—this time with indigenous crew members.

He suffered a heart attack while swimming in Cossack Creek and drowned. A tombstone at his grave in Cossack was erected 'as a mark of appreciation and respect by the North West Pioneers'.
