= Brian Kyme =

Australian Anglican bishop (1935–2020)

The Right Reverend Brian Kyme
- Assistant bishop, Anglican Diocese of Perth
- Church: Anglican Church of Australia
- Diocese: Perth
- In office: 1982–1999

Orders
- Ordination: 1958 (as deacon); 1960 (as priest)
- Consecration: 1 May 1982 by Peter Carnley

Personal details
- Born: 22 June 1935
- Died: 16 April 2020 (aged 84) Perth, Western Australia
- Denomination: Anglican
- Spouse: Doreen
- Children: 2
- Education: Ridley College, Melbourne

Brian Robert Kyme (22 June 1935 – 16 April 2020) was an Australian Anglican bishop, National Director of the Australian Board of Missions, and author.

Kyme trained for the priesthood at Ridley College, Melbourne and was ordained in 1958. Later he studied at Edith Cowan University. He served curacies in Malvern and Morwell. He was the Incumbent at St Matthew's Church, Ashburton from 1963 to 1969 and Dean of Geraldton from 1969 to 1974. He was then at Claremont, Western Australia from 1974 and Archdeacon of Stirling, WA from 1977. In 1982 he became Assistant Bishop of Perth, serving until 1999.

From 1993 to 2000 he served as National Director of the Australian Board of Missions.

Kyme died on 16 April 2020 from cancer.

== Bibliography ==
Bishop Kyme wrote a number of books on history of Anglican church organisations and schools.

- Do this in remembrance of me!: a communion handbook for the reflective Christian, 1985 with Brian Haig
- Grit & grace: the story of the Anglican Board of Mission - Australia, 2013, with Jan Carroll
- John Septimus Roe: the man and the school named in his honour, 2010
- Six archbishops and their ordinands: a study of the leadership provided by successive Archbishops of Perth in their recruitment and formation of clergy in Western Australia, 1914-2005 [thesis], 2005
- The Wollaston legacy, 2007, with Edward Doncaster and Jan Carroll
