= Province of Western Australia =

Ecclesiastical province of the Anglican Church of Australia

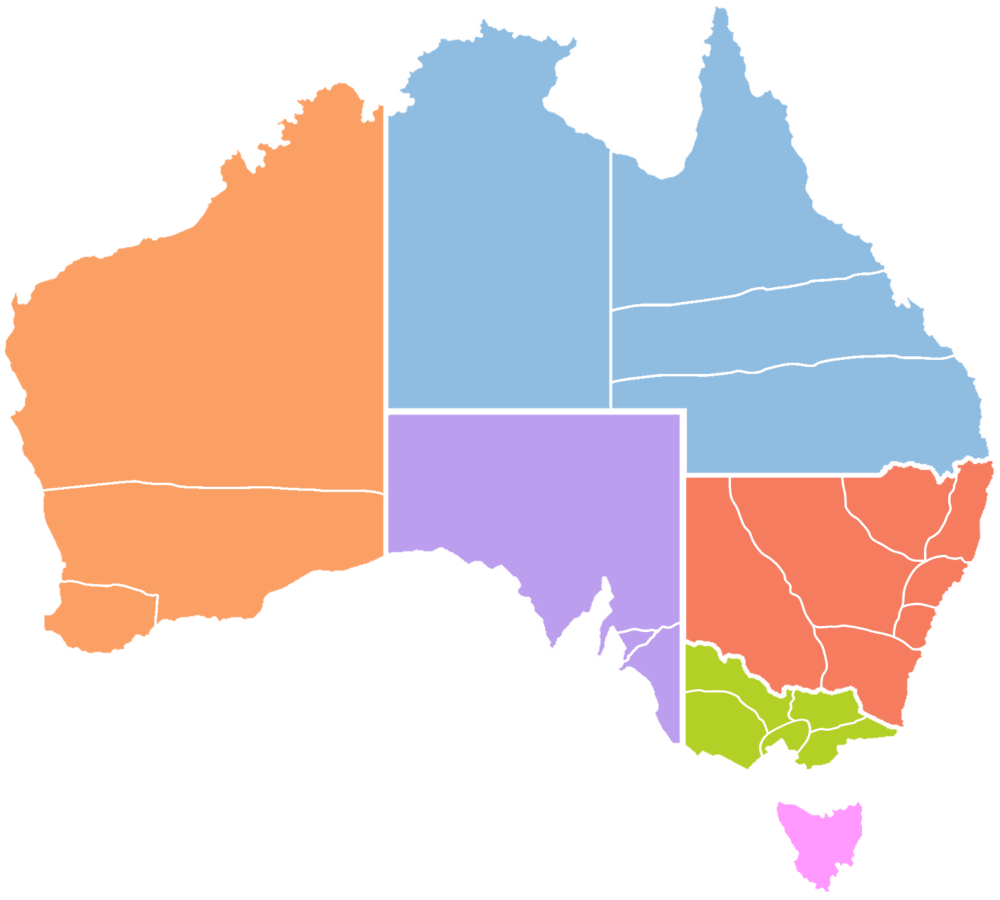
- Location of the Province (depicted in orange) in Australia
- Church: Anglican Church of Australia
- Metropolitan bishop: Archbishop of Perth
- Cathedral: St George's Cathedral, Perth
- Dioceses: Three

The Province of Western Australia is an ecclesiastical province of the Anglican Church of Australia, the boundaries of which are those of the state of Western Australia.

The province consists of three dioceses: Bunbury, North West Australia and Perth. The first provincial synod was called in 1914, and the province was officially constituted in 1915.

There was a magazine until 1939.

The diocesan Bishop of Perth is ex officio metropolitan bishop of the province and therefore also an archbishop. The current (2018) metropolitan of the province is the Most Revd Kay Goldsworthy, Archbishop of Perth.
