= Anglican Bishop of Armidale =

Bishop of Armidale
- Bishopric

anglican
- Coat of arms of the Diocese
- Incumbent: Rod Chiswell since 27 February 2021
- Style: The Right Reverend

Location
- Country: Australia
- Ecclesiastical province: New South Wales

Information
- First holder: Collinson Sawyer
- Denomination: Anglicanism
- Established: 1863
- Diocese: Armidale
- Cathedral: St Peter's Cathedral Armidale

Website
- Diocese of Armidale

The Bishop of Armidale is the diocesan bishop of the Anglican Diocese of Armidale, Australia. The diocese was established in 1863 as the Diocese of Grafton and Armidale. Thus, its diocesan bishop was known as the Bishop of Grafton and Armidale, until the eastern part of the diocese was formed into the new Diocese of Grafton in 1914.

== List of Bishops of Armidale ==
Bishops of Grafton and Armidale
No	From	Until	Incumbent	Notes
1	1867	1868	Collinson Sawyer	Drowned in the River Clarence before his enthronement.
2	1869	1893	James Turner	
3	1894	1901	Arthur Green	Translated to Ballarat.
4	1901	1914	Henry Cooper	Remained in post as Bishop of Armidale.
Bishops of Armidale
1	1914	1916	Henry Cooper	Previously Bishop of Grafton and Armidale.
2	1916	1929	Wentworth Wentworth-Sheilds	
3	1929	1964	John Moyes	
4	1965	1976	Clive Kerle	Previously bishop coadjutor in Sydney since 1956.
5	1976	1999	Peter Chiswell	
6	2000	2012	Peter Brain	
7	2012	2021	Rick Lewers	Consecrated and installed May 2012.
8	2021	present	Rod Chiswell	Consecrated and installed 27 February 2021.
