= Anglican Diocese of Armidale =

Diocese of the Anglican Church of Australia

Diocese of Armidale
- Coat of arms

Location
- Country: Australia
- Ecclesiastical province: New South Wales
- Metropolitan: Archbishop of Sydney
- Coordinates: 30°S 150°E

Statistics
- Churches: 34

Information
- Denomination: Anglicanism
- Established: 1863
- Cathedral: St Peter's Cathedral Armidale

Current leadership
- Bishop: Rod Chiswell

Website
- Diocese of Armidale
- Logo of the Diocese

The Anglican Diocese of Armidale is a diocese of the Anglican Church of Australia located in the state of New South Wales. As the Diocese of Grafton and Armidale, it was created (from the Diocese of Newcastle) by letters patent in 1863. When the Anglican Diocese of Grafton was split off in 1914, the remaining portion was renamed Armidale, retaining its legal continuity and its incumbent bishop.

Once relatively Anglo-Catholic in its liturgical and theological leanings, since the mid-20th century the diocese has leant more towards the Diocese of Sydney and its particular form of Reformed Calvinist Evangelical teaching and liturgy. The diocese is theologically conservative and holds to the traditional Anglican beliefs on human sexuality, disapproving same-sex unions.

The diocese includes the regional cities of Tamworth and Armidale and the towns of Glen Innes, Tenterfield, Inverell, Moree, Gunnedah and Narrabri.

On 12 December 2020, the synod of the diocese elected Rod Chiswell, vicar of South Tamworth, as the 8th Bishop of Armidale. Chiswell was installed on 27 February 2021.

== Cathedral ==
The cathedral church of the diocese is St Peter's Cathedral in Armidale. It was consecrated for worship in 1875. The cathedral was designed by the Canadian architect John Horbury Hunt who also designed the University of New England. The foundation stone was laid by James F. Turner, Bishop of Grafton and Armidale.

== Schools ==
The Diocese of Armidale has three affiliated independent Anglican schools:

- The Armidale School (TAS), founded 1894
- New England Girls' School (NEGS), Armidale, founded 1895
- Calrossy Anglican School, Tamworth, incorporating Calrossy Anglican School for Girls (founded 1919), William Cowper Anglican Boys High School and William Cowper Primary School

== Linked diocese ==
Following a 2004 synod visit by Edward Muhima, Bishop of North Kigezi in Uganda, there has been a forging of a support link between the two dioceses. The Diocese of North Kigezi is in the South West of Uganda, with its office in Rukunjiri.

== Ordination of women ==
The Diocese of Armidale has licensed deaconesses to lead parishes and teach congregations, ordained women as deacons since 1989 and ordained two women as priests. Some leading advocates for women's ordination have been associated with the diocese.

Early in their ministries in the 1970s two deaconesses from the Sydney diocese served the Armidale diocese through leading parishes and teaching congregations; Maureen Cripps and Jacinth Myles. Maureen Cripps was made a deaconess in the 1960s in Sydney and was placed as Deaconess-in-Charge of the parish of Tingha in Armidale from 1971 to 1973. She was ordained as deacon in Sydney in 1989 and appointed to a position in the diocese of Sydney that was seen as a precursor to the Archdeacon for Women's Ministries. From 1974 to 1980 Jacinth Myles was recruited by Clive Kerle to Parish Assistant at St Peter's Cathedral, Armidale. Myles led services, preached to the cathedral congregation, led adult and children's Bible study groups and took baptisms and funerals. She was supported by the bishop, dean and archdeacon to attend the Sydney Diocesan College of Preachers. In 1989 she was ordained as deacon in Sydney and later became Assistant Minister for Sydney parishes where she led services, preached and acted as rector.

The Movement for the Ordination of Women (MOW) and advocates for women's ordination were active in Armidale. Two Armidale convenors of MOW were Margaret Ann Franklin, sociologist at the University of New England and later Ruth Sturmey Jones. Franklin wrote about her efforts to honour the 11 women deacons who were prevented from being ordained priests in St Saviour's Cathedral Goulburn in February 1992, by praying for them and placing eleven red roses in St Paul's cathedral and St Mary's church, with the help of Barbara Field, another MOW member. Franklin also edited two books about women and their experience in the church. Other advocates for women's ordination have been the long-serving Chancellor of the diocese, Keith Mason, former member and legal advisor for MOW and president of the Appellate Tribunal and Kevin Giles, chaplain at St Mark's chapel, University of New England, Armidale 1975–1980 who wrote books and articles from that time advocating for the ordination of women.

The first woman ordained as a deacon in the Armidale diocese was Jennifer (Jenni) Thompson (later Weekes) in 1989. After serving as a deacon in Armidale and other dioceses, she was ordained priest in the Northern Territory in 2010 and became Priest-in-Charge of a parish.

In order to ordain the chaplains of New England Girls School (NEGS) as priests for the girls at the school, Armidale twice temporarily adopted the General Synod's Law of the Church of England Clarification Canon 1992 which repeals any inherited law of the Church of England preventing the ordination of women as priests. Julie McKay (Cook) was ordained deacon then priest in 1996 and was chaplain of NEGS from 1996–2002. Rebecca Eastment, NEGS chaplain 2003–05 and 2014–15, was ordained deacon in 2002 then as priest in 2003. These priests were restricted to serving at the school.

== List of bishops ==
Bishops of Grafton and Armidale
No	From	Until	Incumbent	Notes
1	1867	1868	Collinson Sawyer	Drowned in the River Clarence before his enthronement.
2	1869	1893	James Turner	
3	1894	1901	Arthur Green	Translated to Ballarat.
4	1901	1914	Henry Cooper	Remained in post as Bishop of Armidale.
Bishops of Armidale
1	1914	1916	Henry Cooper	Previously Bishop of Grafton and Armidale.
2	1916	1929	Wentworth Wentworth-Sheilds	
3	1929	1964	John Moyes	
4	1965	1976	Clive Kerle	Previously bishop coadjutor in Sydney since 1956.
5	1976	1999	Peter Chiswell	
6	2000	2012	Peter Brain	
7	2012	2021	Rick Lewers	Consecrated and installed May 2012.
8	2021	present	Rod Chiswell	Consecrated and installed 27 February 2021.

== See also ==
- Anglican Pacifist Fellowship
- Church Missionary Society
- Anglicare
- Evangelical Anglicanism
- Low church
- Calvinism
- Fellowship of Confessing Anglicans
- GAFCON
- Ordination of women in the Anglican communion
