= Grade II listed buildings in Southampton: D–L =

In total there are 317 listed buildings in the city of Southampton, of which 14 are Grade I, 20 are Grade II* and the remainder Grade II.

In England, a building or structure is defined as "listed" when it is placed on a statutory register of buildings of "special architectural or historic interest" by the Secretary of State for Culture, Media and Sport, a Government department, in accordance with the Planning (Listed Buildings and Conservation Areas) Act 1990. English Heritage, a non-departmental public body, acts as an agency of this department to administer the process and advise the department on relevant issues. There are three grades of listing status. The Grade II designation is the lowest, and is used for "nationally important buildings of special interest". Grade II* is used for "particularly important buildings of more than special interest", while Grade I (defined as being of "exceptional interest" and greater than national importance), is the highest of the three grades.

This list summarises 42 Grade II-listed buildings and structures whose names begin with D to L. Numbered buildings with no individual name are listed by the name of the street on which they stand.

== Listed buildings ==
Name	Photograph	Date	Location^{[A]}	Description^{[B]}	Link to Historic England database^{[C]}	Link to British Listed Buildings database^{[D]}
Dart House		late 19th century	SU4267310993; 50.8968°N 1.3946°W	Originally built for the London and South Western Railway, this three-storeyed yellow stock brick building has a central pediment with the initials L.S.W.R. The building has a brick parapet concealing the roof and pilasters between the windows, and a moulded band between the ground and first floors. The main section has seven sash windows at second and first floor levels with a central porch under a pediment on the ground floor. To the left is a one-bay section set back, with two windows at each of the upper floors and a prominent door up a flight of steps. The property was occupied by the Dart Container Line as offices and is now converted into apartments, known as "Maritime Chambers".		
The Deanery walls		mediaeval	SU4261011579; 50.9021°N 1.3954°W	Situated opposite St. Mary's Church, these sections of Mediaeval stone rubble wall (about 9 ft in height) are all that remains of the former deanery. In 2008, the site behind the walls, now apartment blocks, was excavated by archaeologists. Most of the finds were of Mid-Saxon date (AD 650-850) associated with the former town of Hamwic.		
1 to 3 Denzil Avenue		ca. 1840	SU4244512954; 50.9145°N 1.3976°W	This is a terrace of three three-storeyed white rendered houses with rusticated ground floors. No. 2, at the centre, has its second and first floor elevation slightly recessed with engaged Corinthian columns. All three properties have single sash windows at each floor and cast iron balconettes on the first floor, with those on Nos. 1 and 3 more elaborate. Nos. 2 and 3 have round-headed doorcases. The door to No. 1 is on the side of the building. Although similar in style, the adjacent terrace, Nos. 4 to 6, is not listed.		
Director Generals' Building	Director Generals' Building	1840	SU4207112959; 50.9146°N 1.4029°W	Originally called "Avenue House", this substantial house on the corner of The Avenue and Rockstone Place, was one of the last buildings designed by Samuel Toomer. The property was first let to Thomas Leader Harman, a local Liberal politician and proprietor of the Hampshire Independent weekly newspaper. During Harman's occupancy, the house was assessed at 41 windows and four male servants lived in. After Harman left in 1843, other tenants followed until the property was acquired by the Ordnance Survey in 1865, and renamed "Ordnance House", to accommodate the Director-General. The property is three-storeys, built of yellow brick and has full height pilasters at each corner with a dentilled cornice. There are four sash windows at each floor on The Avenue elevation and three on the Rockstone Place elevation. The ground floor windows are round-headed with arched recessed heads, and shell tympana decoration. The main door is at the centre of the Rockstone Place elevation; the stone doorcase has a shallow moulded cornice hood on brackets and pilasters over a round-headed keyed door opening. The property is now occupied as offices by a firm of solicitors. By the door is a blue plaque in memory of Major General Sir Henry James, Director-General of the Ordnance Survey who live here until his death in 1877.		
Duke of Wellington	Duke of Wellington	13th and 15th century	SU4188311200; 50.8988°N 1.4058°W	Situated in Bugle Street, the foundations and cellar of this public house are the remains of a house built circa 1220 by Benedict Ace, one of the first mayors of Southampton. In 1338, the house was seriously damaged during the French raid on the town. In about 1494, the building was converted into a public house by the brewer Rowland Johnson who named it the "Bere House". By 1771, the pub had been named the "Shipwrights Arms" with the present name being adopted after the Battle of Waterloo in 1815. The building was again damaged during the blitz of 1940 with the top floor being completely destroyed, but was restored in 1962/63. The main building is three storeys with exposed square framed timber-framing with plaster infill on a stone base. Each floor oversails the one below it. The first-floor windows are 18th-century, although the ground floor has a modern bar front.		
Eagle Warehouse	Eagle Warehouse	1903	SU4190811125; 50.8981°N 1.4054°W	This Art Nouveau style warehouse, also known as 88 & 90 French Street, was designed by Francis William Wade and, since 1983, has been used by the City Council to house its archaeological collection. The building is four storeys high, with a basement, and is built of red brick with stone dressings. Above the central window on the top floor is a crow-stepped parapet surmounted by an eagle. The three third floor windows are flanked by stone columns. The second floor windows have three lights and cambered heads. They are separated from the windows on the first floor by a panel decorated with Art Nouveau flowers and heart emblems, the numbers 19 and 03, and the letters M and W. The ground floor windows have cambered arches, with a pedimented doorcase inserted into the central window and a carriage entrance on the left with curbing stones. On the southern elevation of the building is painted "May & Wade, Export Grocers, Shipping Contractors".		
Eastgate House	Eastgate House	mid 19th century	SU4202610940; 50.8964°N 1.4038°W	The former Eastgate Printing Works, situated on Town Quay, was converted into offices and luxury apartments in 2008. The building is four storeys high, white rendered with the ground floor facade being grooved to represent masonry. The Town Quay elevation has a total of six windows on each of the top three floors, grouped two to the right, three in the centre and one to the left. Most of the windows on the first and second floors have cambered heads and there is a bay window at the left of the first floor. On the ground floor, there is a former coach entrance. The Winkle Street elevation incorporates a section of the Southampton town walls.		
Ferry House	Ferry House	ca. 1870	SU4272910988; 50.8968°N 1.3938°W	Described as "a good example of Victorian functional design", this building was built as the Docks Board Office and was later used as offices by the Southern Railway. Built of yellow brick on a T-shaped plan at the entrance to Ocean Village it comprises two main blocks, each two storeys high. The western block has six windows on the western elevation and three on each of the northern and southern; the eastern block (at right angles) has five windows on the Canute Road elevation. There are projecting porches on three sides, built later than the original structure. Internally, the property is described as "a very unaltered example of a custom built Victorian office block" with its high-ceilinged rooms and open stairwell with some good joinery and decorative ironwork retained. Formerly the "Cock and Bottle", it is now a J D Wetherspoon pub, named after The Admiral Sir Lucius Curtis.		
Fleming Arms	Fleming Arms	early 18th century	SU4404216052; 50.9422°N 1.3745°W	This public house stands on the banks of Monks Brook and was named after the family of Sir Thomas Fleming. The property is two storeys high built of colour-washed brick. The main elevation has three dormer windows with a pair of windows on the first floor flanking a large square central panel, with moulded stone surround, on which is the Fleming coat of arms. On the ground floor, there are two three-light casement windows with segmental heads. The central door, has a Roman Doric porch. The pub has various extensions to the rear and a single-storey wing on the eastern side also having a Doric porch. The pub was previously owned by George Gale and Co. but is now owned by the Greene King Brewery and operated under the Hungry Horse branding.		
Four Post Hill drinking trough	Four Post Hill drinking trough	1888	SU4113412277; 50.9084°N 1.4161°W	Situated at the junction of Shirley Road and Millbrook Road East, this is a granite drinking trough which is supported on two cylindrical granite legs. At the rear, there is a stone pillar surmounted by a ball finial and the date, 1888. On the face of the pillar, there is a lion's head mask moulding with the inscription "Thou preservest man and beast".		
French Street – Registry Office east end wall	Registry Office east end wall	mediaeval	SU4190611092; 50.8978°N 1.4055°W	This is the rear wall of the Register Office on the French Street facade. It was built of stone and incorporates a reproduction perpendicular window. The remainder of the former County buildings is not of particular architectural interest. The building was occupied for many years by King Edward VI School until 1894.		
French Street – Vaults under Nos 46 and 48		13th and 15th century	SU4191911207; 50.8988°N 1.4053°W	Scheduled as an ancient monument, these two tunnel vaults are situated below a modern block of apartments. The north one is rubble-faced and possibly late-13th- or early-14th-century. The south one is ashlar-faced and probably 15th-century.		
French Street – Wall to East of Mission Hall		mediaeval	SU4193611060; 50.8975°N 1.4050°W	Situated in the grounds of St. John's Infant School, this mediaeval stone wall, about 2 to 4 feet in height, is probably the remains of the Church of St. John.		
Geddes Warehouse	Geddes Warehouse	1866	SU4193910989; 50.8968°N 1.4050°W	Situated on Town Quay, this prominent red brick building is one of the few remaining Victorian warehouses in Southampton. The building has two sections, the western one of six storeys and the eastern of five storeys. Each section has a central gable on which there were originally hoists to raise goods to the upper floors. The original warehouse doors on the gable sections have now been replaced with white French windows with balconettes at each floor. Each floor has six other windows on the western section and four on the eastern; these are metal casements with cambered architraves. The western elevation is similar in style with a gable end and windows flanking the central section. In the apex of the gable is the inscription: "1866, D. Geddes, Surveyor - H.W. Bull, Builder". The property was built as a baggage warehouse for Donald Geddes, who was surveyor to the Harbour Board. In 1979 the City Council bought the property and it is now leased to "Ennio's" restaurant.		
God's House Tower	God's House Tower	ca. 1300	SU4208810932; 50.8963°N 1.4029°W	Situated at the south-east corner of the town walls, this is a late-13th-century gatehouse with a 15th-century gallery and tower. It was erected to defend the sluices into the moat and later served as the town gaol before becoming home to the Museum of Archaeology. The gatehouse and tower are built of stone "rubble" and are two or three storeys high. The arched gateway had a double portcullis, the grooves of which are still visible. The windows are described as "trefoil or cinquefoil headed lights". Under the main tower, the filled in arches of the tidal moat and sluices are visible on both the southern and northern flanks.		
Gordon Monument	Gordon Monument	1885	SU4229811047; 50.8974°N 1.3999°W	Situated in Queen's Park, this memorial to General Charles Gordon was erected in October 1885, nine months after his death. The "light and elegant structure" comprises a stone base on which there are four polished red Aberdeen granite columns, about twenty feet high. The columns are surmounted by carved capitals supporting a cross. The pedestal bears the arms of the Gordon clan and of the borough of Southampton, and also Gordon’s name in Chinese. Around the base is an inscription referring to Gordon as a soldier, philanthropist and administrator; the inscription mentions those parts of the world in which he served, and closes with a quotation from his last letter to his sisters: — "I am quite happy, thank God! and, like Lawrence, I have tried to do my duty."		
The Grapes	The Grapes Public House Oxford Street Southampton	early 19th century	SU4244411111; 50.8979°N 1.3978°W	This public house on Oxford Street is situated close to Southampton Docks and was popular with both dockworkers and crew. It was here that the three Slade brothers had been drinking in April 1912 when they missed the departure of the ill-fated Titanic, their route to the ship having been blocked by a train. The pub is now owned by Coastal Inns & Taverns. It is a three storey yellow brick building with an attic floor above the parapet. At each floor there are three windows, with the centre ones being blank. On the centre of the first floor, there is an ornamental wrought iron overthrow bearing the name of the public house, behind which is a picture of the Titanic. The ground floor bar frontage with three doors is late-19th-century.		
3 Grosvenor Square	No3 Grosvenor Square	ca. 1835	SU4168912522; 50.9107°N 1.4084°W	Originally known as "Oak Villa" and later occupied by The Gregg School, this two-storeyed detached house in painted stucco stands just off Grosvenor Square in an "unfortunate setting" very close to other, later buildings. Together with Nos. 4 and 5 (see below) they are all that are left of eight or nine houses forming part of a scheme which was never completed. It has a large semi-circular bow in the centre the whole height of the building divided by pilasters with panelled pilasters at the corners of the house. It has stringcourses between the floors and a cornice carried round the bow, which has three windows, and a single window each side of the bow.		
4 Grosvenor Square	4 Grosvenor Square	ca. 1835	SU4177212615; 50.9115°N 1.4072°W	Described as "dignified and attractive", this property and its neighbour stand on the north side of the refurbished Grosvenor Square. No. 4 was originally called "The Latimers" and is now "Latimer House". This is a two-storey white stucco house, now occupied as offices and apartments. It has a large semi-circular bow in the centre the whole height of the building divided by pilasters, and is generally similar to No.3. The main door is in the centre of the bow on the ground floor and is approached by three stone steps following the line of the bow. The door has a fanlight over and panelled reveals.		
5 Grosvenor Square	No5 Grosvenor Square	ca. 1835	SU4180612619; 50.9115°N 1.4067°W	This property was shown as "Grosvenor Villa" on the 1870 map. It is similar in design to No.4, with the full height central bow, but the ground floor windows are taller than those of No 4. The property has a Tuscan portico to the side elevation.		
Harbour House	Harbour House	1925	SU4199410897; 50.8961°N 1.4043°W	The former harbour office lies on the approaches to the Town Quay; it was built in 1925, in Edwardian Baroque style, to replace an earlier building from the 19th century, to the designs of E. Cooper Poole, the Borough Engineer. Constructed of red brick with artificial stone trimmings, it is two storeys high, with a central tower with a cupola surmounted by an iron weathervane featuring a ship surmounting a globe, with the motto: "Janua Maris" ("Gateway to the Sea"). The octagonal tower has clocks on four faces and elaborate console brackets. The Town Quay frontage has a cornice and projecting central pediment with six columns. Above the entrance door, there is a balustrade on the first floor. The four windows are now blank; the windows and doorcase have Gibbs surrounds. In 2001, the property was sold to developers; at this time the council's archaeological department recorded the building’s condition before it was refurbished as a casino and restaurant. They reported that "the internal arrangements and decoration are much as built. It was richly decorated, and included moulded plaster panels of famous ships and sea battles. Some of the fittings came from the liner Majestic". The casino is now owned by the Genting Group and trades as "Maxim’s Casino".		
4 to 10 Henstead Road	Norfolk Terrace Henstead Rd Southampton	early 19th century	SU4181612676; 50.9120°N 1.4066°W	Known as "Norfolk Terrace", this is a terrace of four two-storey stuccoed houses, with a modern attic storey having been added to Nos. 6 and 8. Each house has a single first floor sash window with a moulded architrave and flanked by pilasters. The ground floor is rusticated with a single window and a simple doorcase with a rectangular fanlight. The name of the terrace is moulded onto the parapet.		
12 to 20 Henstead Road	York Terrace Henstead Rd Southampton	early 19th century	SU4179012675; 50.9120°N 1.4069°W	Known as "York Terrace", this is a terrace of five three-storey stuccoed houses. Each house has a single sash window on the second and first floors, with a moulded architrave, and pilasters between each property. The ground floor is rusticated with a single window and a simple doorcase with a rectangular fanlight. The name of the terrace is moulded onto a raised band in the centre of the parapet.		
6 High Street		mid 19th century	SU4201411579; 50.9022°N 1.4039°W	Situated close to the Bargate, this is a three-storeyed shop which has the roof concealed behind a high parapet, in which there are three panels. Beneath the parapet is a moulded cornice and flanking pilasters running through the two upper floors which are decorated with swag moulding. The second floor windows are set in moulded architraves with aprons beneath. The first floor windows are taller with keystones and pediments on console brackets. The shop front is modern.		
56 High Street	56 High Street	ca. 1890	SU4204511216; 50.8989°N 1.4037°W	This ornate, Flemish style building is situated between the Red Lion inn and the former head Post Office. The building is four storeys high, with the roof concealed by an elaborate curved pediment over a wide bracketed cornice. On the second and first floors there is a three light canted bay. The shop-front is modern. The facade is heavily decorated with circlets of various fruits, including pineapples, bananas and grapes, reflecting its original use as offices for a firm of fruit importers. The property is occupied by a Balti House takeaway.		
123 & 124 High Street		ca. 1870	SU4200611252; 50.8992°N 1.4040°W	Now occupied by an Italian restaurant, this three storey redbrick building has a steeply pitched slate roof with two false dormer windows. It has four false columns surmounted by small turrets. There are eight double round-arched windows on the second floor and eight mullioned, transom windows on the first floor; the ground floor front is modern. To the left of the building, there is doorcase to first-floor offices with a panel with the moulded inscription, "Market Chambers". The building was originally a fish market and the ground floor interior retains ceramic panels depicting marine subjects: sailing boats, Neptune, Venus and dolphins.		
High Street – Two lamp standards outside the Dolphin Hotel		late 19th century	SU4202511342; 50.9000°N 1.4037°W	These two cast-iron lamp standards stand opposite the central former carriage entrance to the Dolphin Hotel. Standing on a square plinth, they comprise a fluted column surmounted by a lantern with pyramidal tops and ball finials.		
High Street – vaults to Nos 90 and 91		ca. 1300	SU4198711026; 50.8972°N 1.4043°W	Adjacent to Quilters Vault, the vault under No. 90 dates from the early 14th century, constructed of coursed rubble with quarried ashlars at the south-east and north-west corners. In the north wall there is a single light window of ashlar construction. The floor is made of limestone flags. The cellar under No. 91 is later, made of coursed rubble with occasional brick patching; it has a single window in the north-east corner.		
High Street – vault to No 94		14th century	SU4199311049; 50.8974°N 1.4042°W	This vault was originally a warehouse storing wines and commodities. The bays are divided by plain-chamfered ashlar elliptical ribs. At the east end, the last bay is divided into an entrance lobby and a window recess covered by plain barrel vaults. At the west end is a four-centred door and square-headed window. In the south wall, there is a fireplace and an original window. In 1939, the vault was used as the coal cellar for a sweet shop which stood above it. During the Second World War, the vault was converted into an air-raid shelter; during the blitz, the house above was destroyed by a bomb, blocking the exits and fracturing the water main in the High Street. The vault filled with water resulting in many deaths.		
Hollybrook Cemetery – Entrance gates and gate piers	Hollybrook Cemetery - Entrance gates and gate piers	ca. 1910	SU4005015106; 50.9340°N 1.4314°W	Opposite Southampton General Hospital in Tremona Road, the gates to Hollybrook Cemetery are built of coursed rubble with ashlar dressings. The arched vehicle entrance has dripmoulding ending in corbels with a stepped parapet above bearing the Southampton Civic Shield. The two flanking piers are in three stages, the lowest square and the upper two octagonal, and are surmounted by statues of angels. On each side are pedestrian entrances flanked by square piers with gabled caps.		
Holy Rood Chambers		ca. 1870	SU4200411266; 50.8993°N 1.4040°W	This Gothic-style property is situated opposite Holyrood Church. Built of red brick and terracotta with orange stone dressings in the style of Alfred Waterhouse. Three storeys high, with a large central gable flanked by dormers with wooden bargeboards. The end gables are crow-stepped surmounted by tall clustered chimney stacks. The High Street facade has ornate bays on either side extending over the first and second floors. Between the bays there are two windows on each floor, with traceried panels separating each floor. The ground floor has the original stone shop-front with three segmental moulded arches separated by granite columns surmounted by stone lions supporting shields.		
Holy Saviour Church, Bitterne	Holy Saviour Church	1852	SU4520312911; 50.9139°N 1.3584°W	In the centre of Bitterne, the 120 ft spire of this church is a local landmark. Designed in the neo-decorated style by Southampton architect, George Guillaume (c.1808 – 1868), the church is built of coursed rubble with a slate roof. Internally, there is no division between the nave and the chancel; either side of the nave are aisles to the north and south. On the north, there is a three-storeyed tower with a broach spire. The clock in the tower was donated by Sir Steuert MacNaghten, of Bitterne Manor. The church has some fine stained glass including, in the north window of the chancel, a figure of Christ as Salvator Mundi by Morris & Co.		
Holy Trinity Church, Millbrook	Holy Trinity Church, Millbrook	1873–1880	SU3852013082; 50.9159°N 1.4534°W	Millbrook Parish Church replaced the former St. Nicholas church (on the corner of Regents Park Road) which had fallen into disrepair. The church was designed by Henry Woodyer and built of Purbeck stone. The church consists of a chancel with aisles, a tall nave with clerestory, and a stone tower with a 150 ft. high spire. The spire contains four bells, three of which were hung in 1897 as part of the Diamond Jubilee Memorial. The church has many stained glass windows, probably by Clayton and Bell.		
Holy Trinity Church, Weston	Holy Trinity Church, Weston	1865	SU4469910215; 50.8897°N 1.3659°W	The Weston parish church was built on land donated by Thomas Chamberlayne. Holy Trinity was designed by local architect Alfred Bedborough based on St. Matthew’s at Landscove in South Devon (designed by John Loughborough Pearson), where the first incumbent, the Reverend William Preston Hulton, had previously been curate. The church is in a neo-decorated style and is built of coursed rubble with a slate roof. It has a nave and chancel, a gabled porch to the north and a north aisle with flanking tower and spire.		
Houndwell Park drinking fountain	Houndwell Park drinking fountain	1859	SU4214911771; 50.9039°N 1.4019°W	This was the first public drinking fountain installed in Southampton. It was erected at the instigation of the local Unitarian Church minister, Edmund Kell, and funded by a wealthy benefactor, Charles Pierre Melly from Liverpool. Kell provided the fountain in an attempt to curb "the town's drunkenness and disorder" by providing an alternative source of refreshment other than alcohol. Originally installed at the corner of Marsh Lane, East Street and St Mary Street, the fountain was disconnected from the water supply in 1939 and relocated in 1959 to make way for road improvements. The fountain comprises a tapering square pillar of rusticated ashlar with pediments on all four sides, surmounted by a ball finial. There are stone seats at the base on all four sides and two small iron lions' head masks on one face.		
The Junction Inn		mid 19th century	SU4309413644; 50.9207°N 1.3883°W	This public house stands on the corner of Priory Road and Adelaide Road, near St. Denys railway station which is at the junction between the London to Weymouth mainline and the Portsmouth line. It was built on an L-shape plan, although a single-storey bar addition was later built in the angle. The southern front has three sash windows on the first floor, beneath a parapet concealing the slate hipped roof. On the ground floor, there is a large canted bay window on the left and a central round-headed doorway with canopy; to the right, there is an elliptically arched bar window with foiled tracery. The triangular single-storey corner section has a balustrade on the flat roof. The arched windows continue through and into the eastern front and another single-storey extension with a balustrade. Many of the interior fittings remained, including an elaborate bar back and curved counter and fireplace. The pub was severely damaged in a fire in February 2012.		
King George V Graving Dock	RMS Queen Elizabeth in King George V dry dock	1933–1934	SU3935412388; 50.9096°N 1.4416°W	Designed by F.E. Wentworth-Shields, at the time of construction this was the largest graving dock in the world, a status it retained for nearly thirty years. It was taken out of service in 2005 and is now used as a "wet dock". The dock is 1,200 ft. long, 135 ft. wide and over 50 ft. deep and was capable of holding 58,000,000 gallons of water. It has vertical sides with stepped "altars" at the base; at 200 ft. intervals, there are vertical buttresses projecting from the sides of the dock to prevent the bilge keels of vessels striking the base of the walls.		
King George V Graving Dock – pumping station	King George V dry dock pumping station	1933–1934	SU3934112241; 50.9083°N 1.4418°W	This is a rectangular block building, with a half-hipped roof, built of red brick with stone dressing in the "inter-war classical revival style suggesting a temple". The building has a stone cornice and a second stone band above the windows, which are separated by brick pilasters. The original west bay, which housed an office, has been demolished. Internally, the pumphouse walls are lined with cream and green tiles on the lower part. A wooden staircase leads to a mezzanine balcony with a wooden balustrade. In the main, southern part of the building, there are the four pumps which pumped water out of the dock.		
Lankesters Vault		ca. 1300	SU4200211346; 50.9001°N 1.4041°W	This long vault has crossed ribs and windows to the street. Probably built to store wine, it was used during the Second World War as an air-raid shelter. The property above was destroyed during the Blitz, but the occupants of the vault survived. It is now used for temporary art installations.		
Lansdowne House		late 18th century	SU4191811469; 50.9012°N 1.4053°W	This three-storey brick building stands in Castle Lane, opposite the former County Court. It was built for Gorges Foyle, Esq. from whom it was purchased by the Marquess of Lansdowne in 1805. Following Lansdowne's death, his widow Mary Arabelle lived in the house until about 1818. It remained in the family until 1834, since when it has been used as offices, mainly until recently for solicitors. Built of plum coloured brick, the property has grey brick stringcourses between the floors and above the second floor windows, serving as a cornice. Above the cornice is a stucco parapet concealing the roof. The property has six sash windows on each of the upper floors; on the ground floor, the door is left of centre with a doorcase of engaged Doric columns and a broken pediment over a semi-circular fanlight. Above the door, there is an original fire insurance plaque. In the early twentieth century, the adjacent property was used as offices for Randall, Sloper & Co., mineral water manufacturers. Traces of their name are still visible on the moulding above the ground floor windows.		
6 Little Oak Road		ca. 1830	SU4172315947; 50.9415°N 1.4075°W	This thatched cottage is situated close to the junction of Winchester Road and The Avenue, but is not clearly visible from the highway. Built in the "Cottage orné" style, it is mainly two storeys high and built of painted brick. The main, eastern elevation has fretted bargeboards and double pointed-head casement windows to the first floor. On the ground floor, there is a pair of four-light canted bay windows with thatched roofs and gothic heads separated by a round-headed doorcase under a thatched porch, which is probably a later addition. There is a later single-storey extension to the right built in similar style. The western elevation is plainer, with three casement windows to the first floor and a projecting porch with half-columns.		
77 London Road	77 London Road	ca. 1830	SU4203912763; 50.9128°N 1.4034°W	This building, originally No. 1 Carlton Crescent, stands at the junction with London Road. The building is three storeys high in white stucco; parts of the ground floor are rusticated. A cornice conceals the roof; beneath the cornice is a blocking course. The Carlton Crescent elevation has three windows at each floor, with a lower two window wing at an angle to the left. The ground floor windows have round-headed openings. On London Road, there is a three-window segmental bow on the first floor with a balcony above. The main entrance door is on the corner of the building with three arcaded plate glass windows on each side. On the London Road elevation, there is a small single-storey extension with a round-headed window. The property, which formed the lead into Carlton Crescent was occupied by a branch of National Westminster Bank; it is now occupied by Richer Sounds.		

=== Notes ===
- ^{A} Location is given first as a grid reference, based on the British national grid reference system (or OSGB36) of the Ordnance Survey; and second as World Geodetic System 84coordinates, used by the Global Positioning System.
- ^{B} Unless otherwise stated, the descriptions are based on those on the Historic England database.
- ^{C} The Historic England database is the official listing and includes a description of the property, the reasons for designation, the date of listing and an extract from the Ordnance Survey map at a scale of 1:2500 pinpointing the exact location of the building.
- ^{D} The British Listed Buildings database also includes the details of the property from the Historic England database, together with links to Google/street view, Ordnance Survey and Bing maps/birds eye view.
