= William Boyd Carpenter =

English Anglican bishop (1841–1918)

The Right Reverend William Boyd Carpenter KCVO
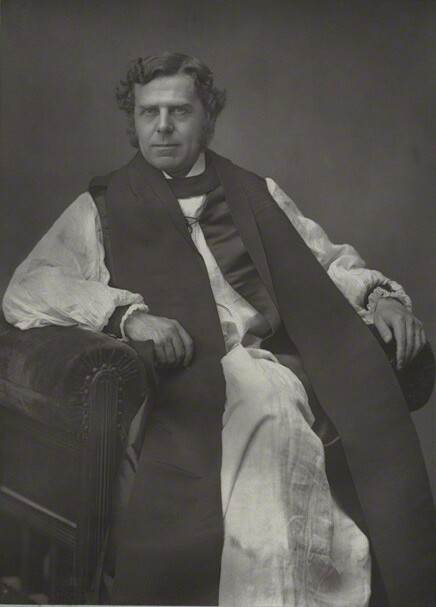
- Boyd Carpenter in 1889
- Born: 26 March 1841; Liverpool, England
- Died: 26 October 1918 (aged 77); Westminster, England
- Occupation: Anglican cleric
- Years active: 1878–1918
- Spouses: Harriet Charlotte Peers; Annie Maude Gardner
- Parents: Henry Carpenter; Hester Boyd
- Relatives: Archibald Boyd (uncle); Sir Archibald Boyd-Carpenter (son); Francis Wentworth-Sheilds (son-in-law); The Lord Boyd-Carpenter (grandson); Sir Thomas Boyd-Carpenter (great-grandson); The Viscountess Hailsham (great-granddaughter); William Boyd-Carpenter (son); Sir Henry Boyd-Carpenter (great-grandson); Stephen Oliver, composer (great-grandson); John William Oliver (great-great-grandson)

William Boyd Carpenter KCVO (26 March 1841 – 26 October 1918) was an English cleric in the Church of England who became Bishop of Ripon and Royal Chaplain to Queen Victoria.

== Background ==
William Boyd Carpenter was the second son of Henry Carpenter, perpetual curate of St Michael's Church, Aigburth, Liverpool, who married (marriage licence 1837 in Derry) Hester Boyd, of Derry, sister of Archibald Boyd, Dean of Exeter.

Carpenter was the uncle of Mrs Henry Williams of Moor Park House, Beckwithshaw, North Yorkshire. In 1897 he consecrated St Michaels and All Angels Church at Beckwithshaw, after she and her husband had funded its construction.

He was an advocate for the poor and against the caste system in India, stating during a religious lecture at the University of Oxford that "we must show fierce scorn against the hateful laws of caste and proclaim the natural equality of all men".

== Education and career ==
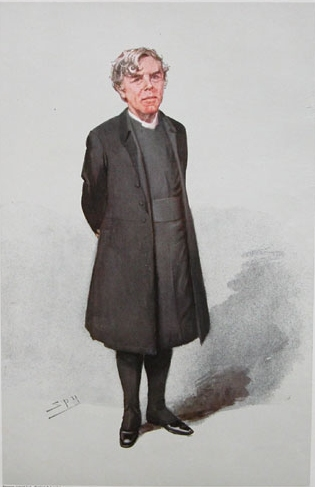
"A man Right Reverend and Well-Beloved"; Boyd Carpenter as caricatured by Spy (Leslie Ward) in Vanity Fair, March 1906

Educated at the Liverpool Institute, before going up to St Catharine's College, Cambridge, Boyd Carpenter was appointed Hulsean Lecturer at Cambridge in 1878. He held several curacies, was Vicar of Christ Church, Lancaster Gate, from 1879 to 1884, Canon of Windsor in 1882–84, and after 1884 Bishop of Ripon. In 1887 he was appointed Bampton Lecturer at Oxford, and in 1895 Pastoral Lecturer on Theology at Cambridge. In June 1901, he received an honorary doctorate of Divinity from the University of Glasgow. During his time in Ripon, he moved from his original evangelical leanings to a broad church outlook.

In 1904 and 1913 he visited the United States and delivered the Noble lectures at Harvard. He was Chaplain-in-Ordinary to Queen Victoria, Edward VII, and George V. He resigned his see in 1911 on the grounds of ill-health and became a Canon and Sub-Dean of Westminster.

Boyd Carpenter served as Clerk of the Closet from 1903 to 1918.

== Publications ==
His publications include:

- Commentary on Revelation (1879)
- Permanent Elements of Religion (Bampton lectures, 1889)
- Popular History of the Church of England (1900)
- Witness to the Influence of Christ (1905)
- Some Pages of my Life (1911)
- Life's Tangled Thread (1912)
- The Apology of Experience (1913)
- The Burning Bush and Other Sermons. (1893)

== Family ==
In 1864 Carpenter married his first wife, Harriet Charlotte Peers, daughter of the Rev. J. W. Peers, of Chislehampton. They had four sons and four daughters, including:

- Henry John Boyd-Carpenter (1865–1923), colonial official in Egypt, where he was Chief Inspector to the Ministry of Public Instruction, then Inspector General of Schools; who married in Epperstone on 16 December 1902 Ethel Ley, daughter of Sir Francis Ley, 1st Baronet, of Epperstone Manor, Nottinghamshire.
- William Boyd-Carpenter (1869–1954).
- Annie Boyd-Carpenter (1870-1927) married Francis Wentworth-Sheilds, Bishop of Armidale.
- Sir Archibald Boyd Boyd-Carpenter (1873–1937), Conservative MP, father of John Archibald Boyd-Carpenter, Baron Boyd-Carpenter (1908–1998), also a Conservative MP.

Harriet died in January 1877 and in 1883 Carpenter married secondly, Annie Maude, daughter of publisher W. W. Gardner, with whom he had a son and three daughters.

The composer Stephen Oliver (1950–1992), through his mother (Charlotte) Hester Girdlestone born 1911, granddaughter of Carpenter), and his nephew, the comedian John Oliver (b. 1977), are descendants.

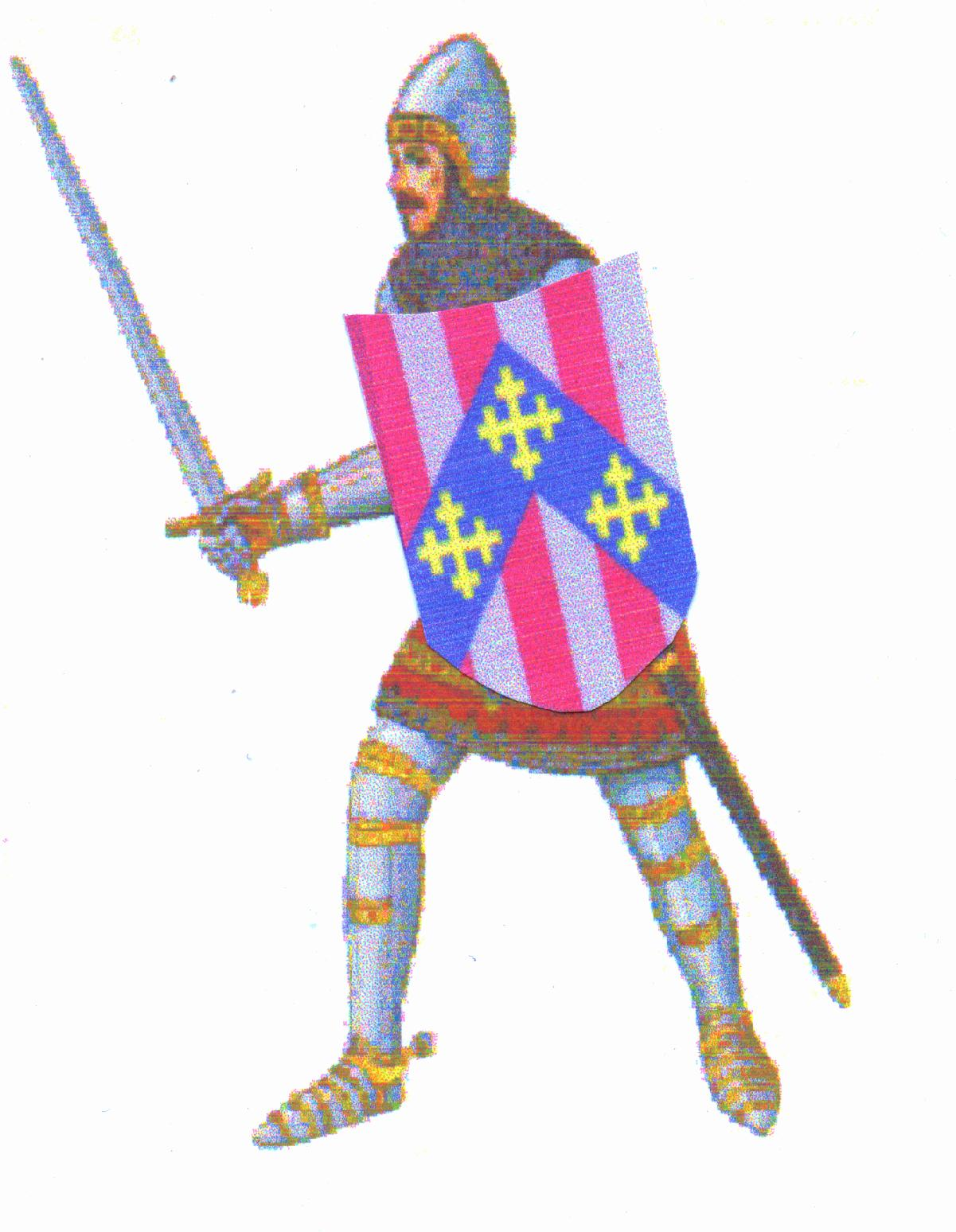
A medieval knight sporting an early example of the Carpenter arms

== Sources ==
Religious titles
Preceded by Robert Bickersteth	Bishop of Ripon; 1884–1912	Succeeded by Thomas Wortley Drury
