= Florence Green (headmistress) =

Australian headmistress (1862–1926)

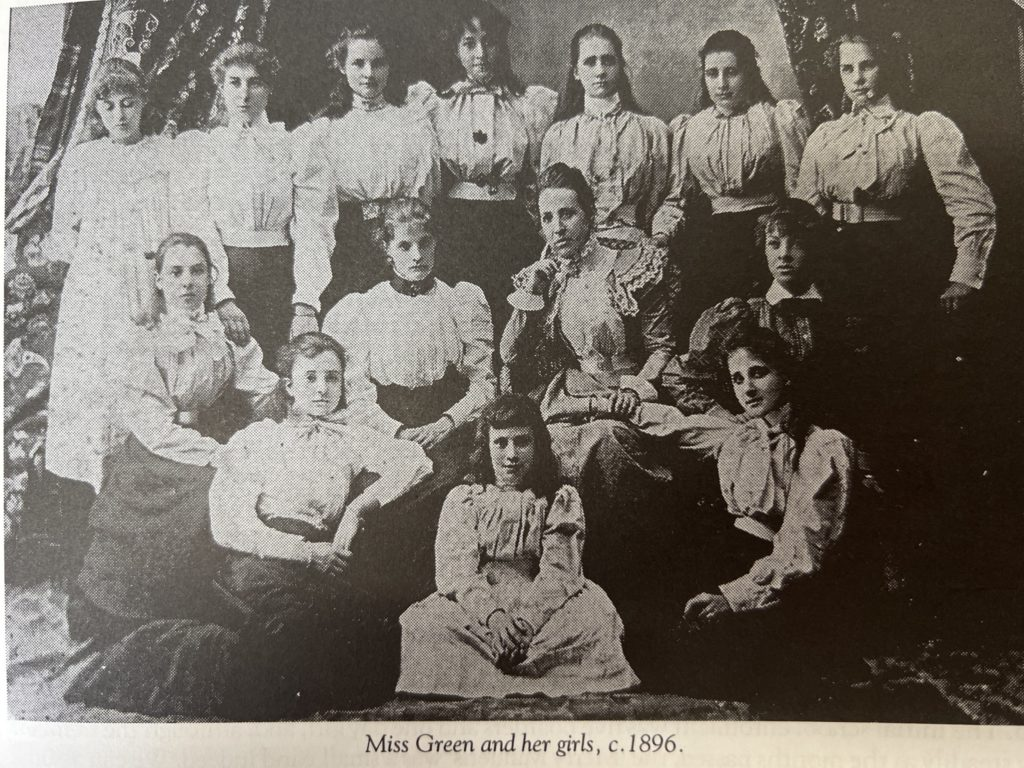
- Born: Florence Emily Green; 12 April 1862; Oamaru, New Zealand
- Died: 5 April 1926 (aged 63); Murrumbeena, Victoria, Australia
- Education: Australian College of Theology
- Known for: Founder of New England Girls' School
- Relatives: Arthur Green (brother)

Florence Emily Green (12 April 1862 – 5 April 1926) was an Australian headmistress. She was the founding headmistress at the New England Girls' School in New South Wales.

== Life ==
Green was born in 1862 in Oamaru, New Zealand. Her parents were Eliza Green (née Dutton) and her husband, the Reverend Samuel Dutton Green. Her elder brother Arthur Vincent Green had been born in 1857. They were brought up in Adelaide, Wales and Scotland. Her younger brother was educated at Trinity College, Melbourne and ordained in 1880, but she was educated at home and at a private school in Melbourne. She then attended the Australian College of Theology where she achieved first-class honours.

Green paid for the education of Ethel Florence Lindesay Richardson. In Richardson's coming of age novel, The Getting of Wisdom, written under the pen name of Henry Handel Richardson, Green was depicted as Miss Isabella, and Arthur as her brother, the Rev Mr Shepherd. Richardson is said to have described Green "maliciously but accurately".

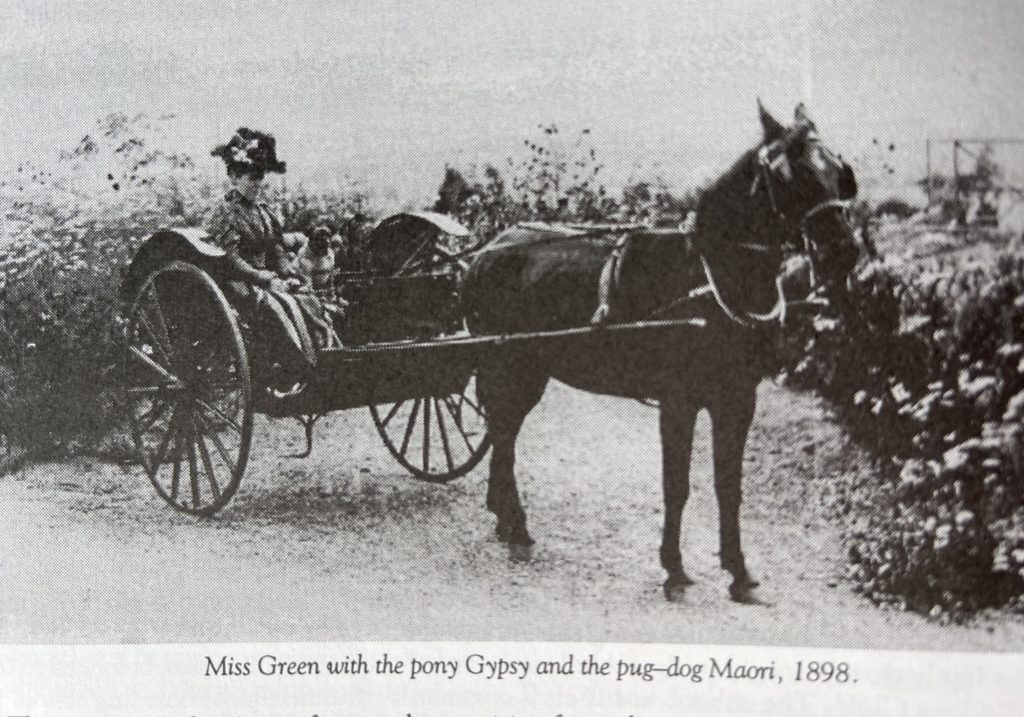
Miss Green and her pony in 1898

Green was a serial founder of schools for girls. She was the founding headmistress of the New England Girls' School in 1895. Another sister, Agnes, was a religious in the Community of St. Denys in Warminster.

After going overseas in 1908, Green returned to Australia in 1910, becoming the temporary head of the new Firbank Girls' Grammar School. She was unwell and she stepped down in the following year.

== Death and legacy ==
Green died in 1926 in Murrumbeena of Parkinson's disease. In 1927, the foundation stone of the Florence Green Memorial Chapel at New England Girls' School was laid. It was opened by John Moyes, the Bishop of Armidale, on 29 September 1936. Its external walls are of blue brick and its internals are of oak.
