= Kerle =

Kerle is a surname. Notable people with the surname include:

- Brian Kerle (born 1945), Australian basketball player and coach
- Clive Kerle (1915–1997), Australian Anglican bishop
- Gaspard Kerle, alias of Johann Caspar Kerll (1627–1693), German composer and organist
- Matthew Kerle, Australian politician
