= Peter Chiswell =

Peter Chiswell may refer to:

- Peter Chiswell (bishop) (1934–2013)
- Peter Chiswell (British Army officer) (1930–2025)
