= Sea trial =

Testing phase of newly-constructed watercraft

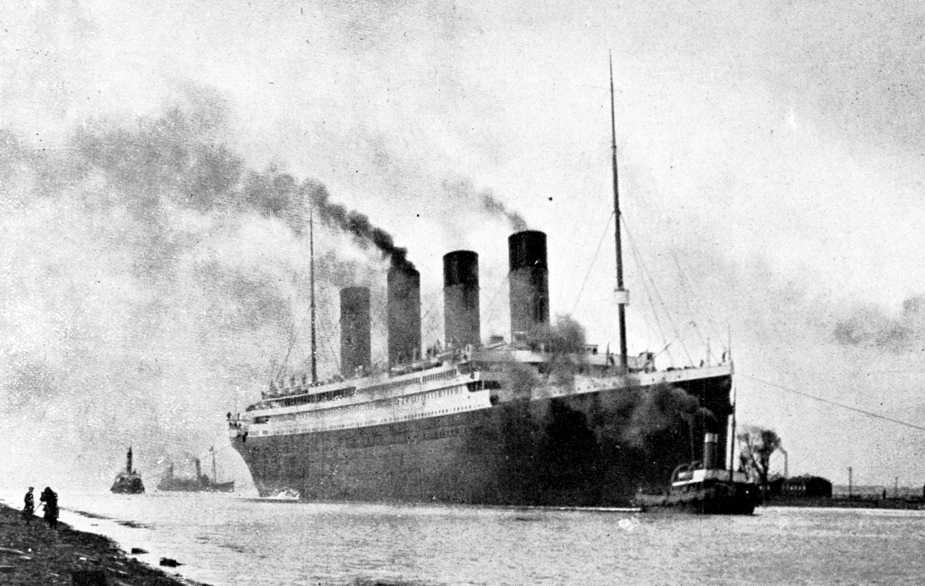
Titanic departing Belfast during her sea trials

A sea trial or trial trip is the testing phase of a watercraft (including boats, ships, and submarines). It is also referred to as a "shakedown cruise" by many naval personnel. It is usually the last phase of construction and takes place on open water, and it can last from a few hours to many days.

Sea trials are conducted to measure a vessel's performance and general seaworthiness. Testing of a vessel's speed, maneuverability, equipment and safety features are usually conducted. Usually in attendance are technical representatives from the builder (and from builders of major systems), governing and certification officials, and representatives of the owners. Successful sea trials subsequently lead to a vessel's certification for commissioning and acceptance by its owner.

Although sea trials are commonly thought to be conducted only on new-built vessels (referred by shipbuilders as 'builders trials'), they are regularly conducted on commissioned vessels as well. In new vessels, they are used to determine conformance to construction specifications. On commissioned vessels, they are generally used to confirm the impact of any modifications.

Sea trials can also refer to a short test trip undertaken by a prospective buyer of a new or used vessel as one determining factor in whether to purchase the vessel.

== Typical trials ==
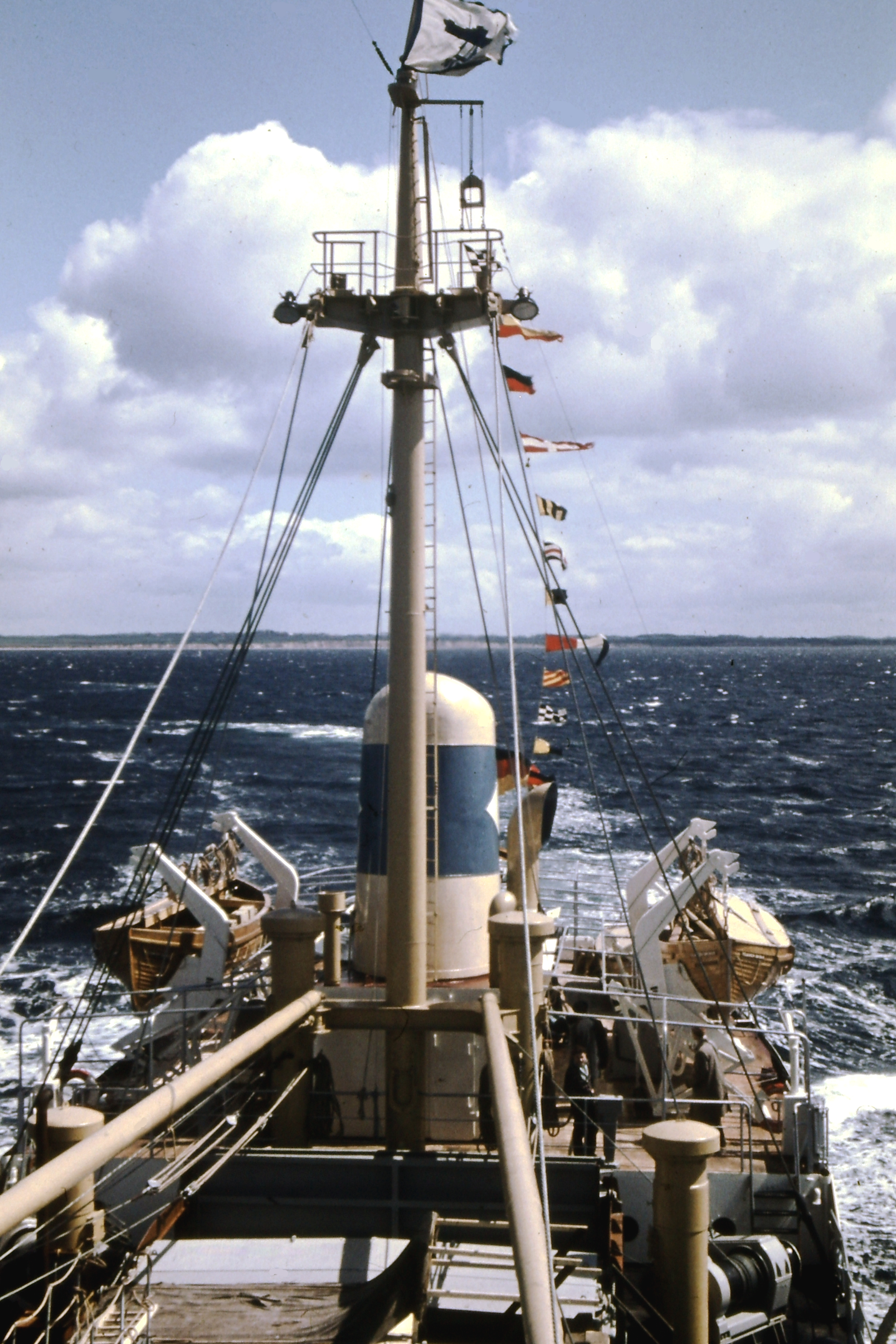
Nobiskrug new ship Sabine Howaldt on sea trials in the Kiel Fjord in May 1958

Sea trials are fairly standardized using technical bulletins published by ITTC, SNAME, BMT, regulatory agencies or the owners. They involve demonstrations and tests of the ship's systems and performance.

=== Speed trial ===
In a speed trial the vessel is ballasted or loaded to a predetermined draft and the propulsion machinery is set to the contracted maximum service setting, usually some percentage of the machinery's maximum continuous rating (ex: 90% MCR). The ship's heading is adjusted to have the wind and tide as close to bow-on as possible. The vessel is allowed to come to speed and the speed is continuously recorded using differential GPS. The trial will be executed with different speeds including service (design) and maximum speed. The ship is then turned through 180° and the procedure is followed again. This reduces the impact of wind and tide. The final "Trials Speed" is determined by averaging all of the measured speeds during each of the runs. This process may be repeated in various sea states.

=== Crash stop ===
To test a crash stop, the vessel is ballasted or loaded to a predetermined draft and the propulsion machinery is set to the contracted maximum service setting, usually some percentage of the machinery's maximum continuous rating. The trial begins once the order to "Execute Crash Stop" is given. At this point the propulsion machinery is set to full-astern and the helm is put hard-over to either port or starboard. The speed, position and heading are continuously recorded using differential GPS. The final time to stop (i.e.: ship speed is 0 knots) track line, drift (distance traveled perpendicular to the original course) and advance (distance traveled along the original course line) are all calculated. The trial may be repeated at various starting speeds.

=== Endurance ===
During endurance trials the vessel is ballasted or loaded to a predetermined draft and the propulsion machinery is set to the contracted maximum service setting, usually some percentage of the machinery's maximum continuous rating. The fuel flow, exhaust and cooling water temperatures and ship's speed are all recorded.

=== Maneuvering trials ===
Maneuvering trials involve a number of trials to determine the maneuverability and directional stability of the ship may be conducted. These include a direct and reverse spiral manoeuvres, zig-zag, and lateral thruster use.

=== Seakeeping ===
Seakeeping trials were originally used exclusively for passenger ships, but are now used in a variety of vessels. They involve measurements of ship motions in various sea states, followed by a series of analyses to determine comfort levels, likelihood of sea sickness and hull damage. Trials are usually protracted in nature due to the unpredictability of finding the correct sea state, and the need to conduct the trials at various headings and speeds.

== Noteworthy sea trials ==
- RMS Lusitania – While steaming at high speeds, severe vibration was noted at the stern during her sea trials. This prompted her builder, John Brown & Company, to reinforce that area before acceptance by Cunard.
- SS Normandie – During sea trials, vibration was noted at the ship's stern. The stern was reinforced, accepted by her owners Compagnie Générale Transatlantique, and continued onto her maiden voyage. The vibration was severe enough to necessitate relocating Tourist Class passengers and some crew members with cabins near the affected area. The problem was subsequently resolved by changing her propellers to four-bladed ones from the original three-bladed ones.
- RMS Queen Elizabeth – At the start of World War II, it was decided that Queen Elizabeth was so vital to the war effort that she must not have her movements tracked by German spies operating in the Clydebank area. Therefore, an elaborate ruse was fabricated involving her sailing to Southampton to complete her fitting out. Another factor prompting Queen Elizabeth's departure was the necessity to clear the fitting out berth at the shipyard for the battleship HMS Duke of York, which was in need of its final fitting-out. Only the berth at John Brown could accommodate the King George V-class battleship's needs.
  One major factor that limited the ship's secret departure date was that there were only two spring tides that year that would see the water level high enough for Queen Elizabeth to leave the Clydebank shipyard, and German intelligence were aware of this fact. A minimal crew of four hundred were assigned for the trip; most were transferred from Aquitania for a short coastal voyage to Southampton. Parts were shipped to Southampton, and preparations were made to move the ship into the King George V graving dock when she arrived. The names of Brown's shipyard employees were booked to local hotels in Southampton to give a false trail of information and Captain John Townley was appointed as her first master. Townley had previously commanded Aquitania on one voyage, and several of Cunard's smaller vessels before that. Townley and his hastily signed on crew of four hundred Cunard personnel were told by a company representative before they left to pack for a voyage where they could be away from home for up to six months.
  By the beginning of March 1940, Queen Elizabeth was ready for her secret voyage. The Cunard colours were painted over with battleship grey, and on the morning of 3 March, Queen Elizabeth quietly left her moorings in the Clyde and proceeded out of the river to sail further down the coast, where she was met by the King's Messenger, who presented sealed orders directly to the captain. While waiting for the Messenger, the ship was refuelled; adjustments to the ship's compass and some final testing of equipment were also carried out before she sailed to her secret destination.
  Captain Townley discovered that he was to take the ship directly to New York in the then neutral United States without stopping, or even slowing to drop off the Southampton harbour pilot who had embarked on at Clydebank, and to maintain strict radio silence. Later that day, at the time when she was due to arrive at Southampton, the city was bombed by the Luftwaffe. After a zigzagged crossing taking six days to avoid German U-boats, Queen Elizabeth had still crossed the Atlantic at an average speed of 26 knots. In New York she found herself moored alongside both Queen Mary and the French Line's Normandie, the only time all three of the world's largest liners were berthed together. Captain Townley received two telegrams on his arrival, one from his wife congratulating him and the other from Queen Elizabeth thanking him for the vessel's safe delivery. The ship was then secured so that no one could board her without prior permission, including port officials.
- RMS Queen Mary 2 – Her trials were conducted over two periods, September 25–29, 2003 and November 7–11, 2003, each lasting four days at sea, shuttling between the islands of Belle-Ile and L'ile d'Yeu off the French coast. On board for each set of trials were 450 people, including engineers, technicians, owner and insurance company representatives, and crew.
- USS Thresher (SSN-593) – Lost during deep sea diving tests on April 10, 1963.
