= Wentworth Wentworth-Sheilds =

- Born: Wentworth Francis Sheilds; 2 April 1867; Lewisham, London
- Died: 13 September 1944 (aged 77); London, England
- Spouse: Annie Carpenter (1902–1927)
- Parent(s): Francis Webb Sheilds, Adelaide Baker
- Relatives: Francis Wentworth-Sheilds (brother); William Boyd Carpenter (father-in-law)

The Rt. Rev. Wentworth Francis Wentworth-Sheilds (also spelt Shields; 2 April 1867 – 13 September 1944) was an Anglican bishop in the first half of the 20th century.

He was born in 1867, the eldest of two sons of engineer Francis Webb Sheilds and Adelaide Baker. Francis Wentworth-Sheilds was his younger brother. The family added the surname Wentworth in 1877. He was educated at St Paul's School in London and London University. Ordained in 1899, he began his ordained ministry with curacies at St John the Baptist's Plumstead and St George's, Bloomsbury, England.

Shortly after his marriage in April 1902, he sailed to Australia where he was initially Precentor of St Saviour's Cathedral, Goulburn and then Archdeacon of Wagga Wagga. Later he was Warden of Bishop's College, Goulburn, then Rector of St James', King Street, Sydney (1910–16) and then, later, the second Bishop of Armidale, a post he held for 13 years (1916-1929).

On his return to England he was Warden of St Deiniol's Library, Hawarden. He died on 12 September 1944.

== Family ==
He married at the Palace chapel, Ripon, on 3 April 1902, Annie Carpenter, the daughter of William Boyd Carpenter, Bishop of Ripon, who officiated during the ceremony.

Anglican Communion titles
Preceded by Henry Edward Cooper	Bishop of Armidale; 1916– 1929	Succeeded by John Stoward Moyes
