= Arthur Green (bishop) =

Australian Anglican bishop

Arthur Vincent Green (12 May 1857 – 24 September 1944) was an Anglican bishop in the late 19th and early 20th centuries, who founded two theological colleges.

== Life ==
Green was born in Albury, Surrey on 12 May 1857. His parents were Eliza (born Dutton) and her husband Rev. Samuel Dutton Green. His younger sister and supporter Florence was born in 1862. They were brought up in Adelaide, Wales and Scotland and educated at Trinity College, Melbourne. He was ordained in 1880 and his first posts were curacies at St Andrew's Church, Brighton, and St Peter's, Eastern Hill, Melbourne. He then held incumbencies at Holy Trinity, Maldon and St Paul's, Geelong. His next post was as Archdeacon of Ballarat. In 1894 he was ordained to the episcopate as the Bishop of Grafton and Armidale. In 1898 he founded St John's College, Armidale and was the first Warden.

In 1900 he was translated to Ballarat. In 1903 he founded St Aidan's Theological College and made a start on work on Christ Church Cathedral. He retired as bishop in 1915. From 1920 he was a lecturer in theology at his old college.

His sister Florence paid for the education of a young Henry Handel Richardson; in Richardson's coming of age novel The Getting of Wisdom Florence was depicted as Miss Isabella, and Arthur as her brother, the Rev Mr Shepherd. She was the founding headmistress of the New England Girls' School. Another sister, Agnes, was a religious in the Community of St. Denys in Warminster.

He died on 24 September 1944, aged 87.
