= Francis Webb Sheilds =

Anglo-Irish civil engineer

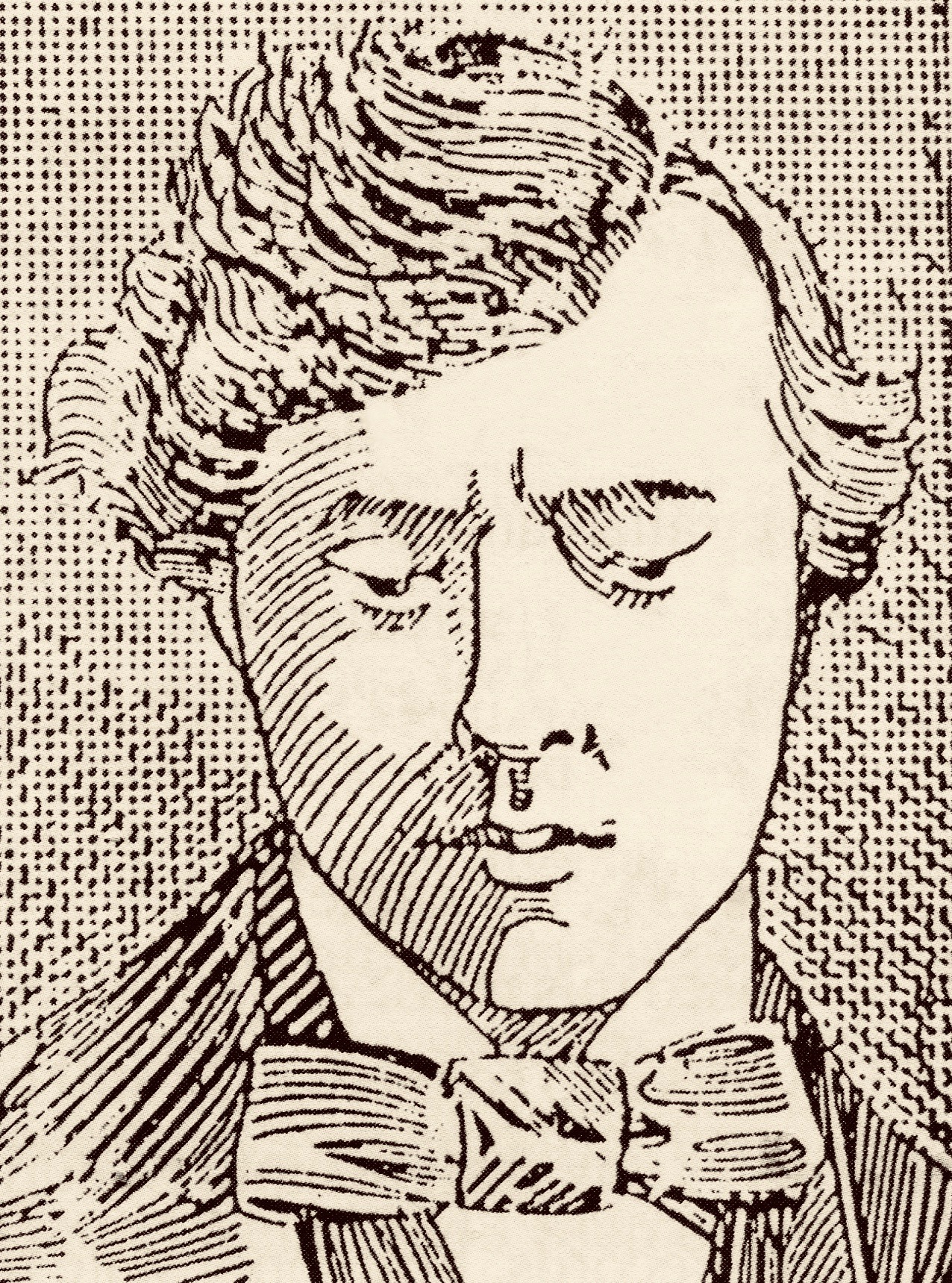
- Born: 8 October 1820; Ireland
- Died: 18 January 1906 (aged 85); Southampton
- Other names: Francis Webb Wentworth-Sheilds
- Occupation: Civil engineer
- Known for: Sydney Railway Company
- Spouse: Adelaide Baker (m.1860)
- Children: Wentworth Wentworth-Sheilds; Francis Wentworth-Sheilds
- Parent(s): Rev. Wentworth Sheilds; Isabella Plunkett
- Relatives: John Gore Sheilds (brother)

Francis Webb Wentworth-Sheilds (born Sheilds; 8 October 1820 – 18 January 1906) was an Anglo-Irish civil engineer on the Sydney Railway Company during its construction but before its opening.

In Great Britain and Ireland, Sheilds worked on a number of railway projects, including the then 4 ft 8 1/2 in (1,435 mm) Dublin and Kingstown Railway. He considered himself to be a born railway engineer.

== City Surveyor ==
Sheilds was the Sydney City Surveyor in 1843 for a few years where he worked on water works. He resigned in 1849 in order to take up a post with the Sydney Railway Company.

== Sydney Railway Company engineer ==
Sheilds is mainly remembered because he persuaded the company to adopt the 5 ft 3 in (1600 mm) rail gauge rather than the English gauge of 4 ft 8 1/2 in (1435 mm), which became known as "standard gauge". Sheilds had worked as an engineer on railways in Ireland, which had adopted 5 ft 3 in (1600 mm). His proposal was backed by the British Board of Trade and agreed to by all Australian colonies.

Sheilds resigned in 1850 when his pay was cut due to the company's financial difficulties. His replacement, Scotsman James Wallace, urged the company's directors to change the track gauge to the 4 ft 8 1/2 in (1435 mm), and the New South Wales government concurred. However, the construction of 5 ft 3 in (1600 mm) broad gauge lines had already started in Victoria and South Australia, and the necessary rolling stock had been ordered from Britain. The two colonies strongly protested about the change and declined to follow suit on the grounds of cost.

The overturning by New South Wales of the original gauge decision is the origin of the huge problems caused by breaks of gauge between 5 ft 3 in (1600 mm) and 4 ft 8 1/2 in (1435 mm) railways in Australia. To add to the predicament, most other Australian colonies, including parts of South Australia, later adopted the cheaper narrow gauge of 3 ft 6 in (1067 mm). Tasmania's first railway was constructed with a 5 ft 3 in (1600 mm) gauge, but it was converted to 3 ft 6 in (1067 mm) in 1888.

== See also ==
- Rail gauge in Australia
