= Rick Lewers =

Australian bishop (born 1957/58)

The Right Reverend Rick Lewers
- Bishop of Armidale
- Church: Anglican Church of Australia
- Diocese: Armidale
- In office: 29 May 2012–30 January 2021
- Predecessor: Peter Brain
- Successor: Rod Chiswell

Orders
- Consecration: 25 May 2012 by Peter Jensen

Personal details
- Born: 1957 or 1958 (age 67–68)
- Denomination: Anglican
- Spouse: Janene
- Children: 3
- Education: Sydney Missionary and Bible College; Moore Theological College

Richard Alexander Lewers (born 1957 or 1958) is an Australian bishop in the Anglican Church of Australia, who served as the Bishop of Armidale from 29 May 2012 to 30 January 2021.

== Early life and parish ministry ==
Lewers grew up in the Sutherland Shire and originally worked in banking. He studied for ministry at Sydney Missionary and Bible College and Moore Theological College. After his ordination, he served a curacy in the late 1980s at Liverpool, and then moved to the Anglican Diocese of Canberra and Goulburn for 11 years, eventually serving as Rector of St Matthew's, Wanniassa. While in Canberra, Lewers served as sports chaplain to the Canberra Cosmos FC and the ACT Brumbies.

Lewers then returned to the Anglican Diocese of Sydney, working for the Diocese's Department of Evangelism and then serving as the rector of Engadine Anglican Church, a position which he held until his election as bishop.

== Episcopal ministry ==
In November 2011, Lewers was appointed as the new Bishop of Armidale, succeeding Peter Brain who had served for the previous 11 years and who had retired in April that year. He was consecrated bishop in St Andrew's Cathedral, Sydney on 25 May 2012 by Archbishop of Sydney Peter Jensen, and installed as Bishop of Armidale in St Peter's Cathedral, Armidale on 29 May 2012.

As Bishop, Lewers wrote a column in the local news, the Armidale Express, called "Faith Matters".

Lewers announced his intention to resign as Bishop on 21 July 2020 to take up a Rector's position at Shoalhaven Heads, New South Wales, with the resignation to take effect from 30 January 2021.

== Personal life ==
Lewers is married to Janene, and has 3 adult children.

Anglican Communion titles
Preceded by Peter Brain	Bishop of Armidale; 2012–2021	Succeeded by Rod Chiswell
