= New England Girls' School =

NEGS

Location
- 13–83 Uralla Road, Armidale, New South Wales 2350; Australia
- Coordinates: 30.520296°S 151.6427641°E

Information
- Type: independent, comprehensive, single-sex secondary, co-ed early learning, primary, secondary, day, boarding school
- Motto: Latin: Quodcumque Facitis Ex Animo Operamini (Whatsoever you do, do it heartily)
- Denomination: Anglican
- Established: 1895; 131 years ago
- Founder: Florence Emily Green
- Chairman: John Cassidy
- Principal: Liz van Genderen
- Colours: Navy blue, scarlet and sky blue
- Affiliations: Association of Independent Schools of New South Wales; Junior School Heads Association of Australia; Australian Boarding Schools' Association; Alliance of Girls' Schools Australasia; Association of Heads of Independent Girls' Schools
- Website: www.negs.nsw.edu.au

New England Girls' School (NEGS) is an independent Anglican school in Armidale, Northern NSW for both junior boys and girls and for Senior girls. It is a boarding school.

Established in 1895 by Florence Emily Green, NEGS is a non-selective school, and caters for approximately 310 students from pre-preparatory (4 years old) to Year 12 (18 years old), including 140 boarders from Years 5 to 12.

NEGS is affiliated with the Association of Independent Schools of New South Wales (AIS NSW), the Junior School Heads Association of Australia (JSHAA), the Australian Boarding Schools' Association (ABSA), the Alliance of Girls' Schools Australasia (AGSA), and is an affiliate member of the Association of Heads of Independent Girls' Schools (AHIGS). NEGS Limited in its capacity as Trustee administers the school on behalf of the Anglican Diocese of Armidale.

== History ==
NEGS was founded in 1895 by Florence Emily Green, a deeply religious educator from Oamaru, New Zealand. The aim of the school was to provide an all-round education for girls, with a strong emphasis on Christian values, to prepare students for the challenges of the new century. The school's first building was named 'Akaroa', and contained a large classroom, an office and boarding facilities. Today the building is the school's administration centre, with the original classroom now used for meetings and functions, and named the 'W.H. Lee Room' after the school's architect.

Under Miss Green's guidance NEGS became one of the largest girls' boarding schools in Australia. In 1907, NEGS was purchased by the Anglican diocese and a school Council was appointed. Miss Green subsequently moved to Victoria in 1908 to act as caretaker headmistress to Firbank Church of England Girls' Grammar School, in Brighton.

NEGS' first brick building, later known as "Northern and Southern", was opened in 1911. This building contained an assembly hall, gymnasium and boarding facilities.

In 1936 the Florence Green Memorial chapel was opened by John Moyes, the Bishop of Armidale in 1936. Its external walls are of blue brick and its internals are of oak.

During the principalship of Anna Abbott from 1990 to 2000, the International Baccalaureate was introduced, the Music program was expanded, and an ordained woman appointed to be the school's chaplain.

== Principals ==
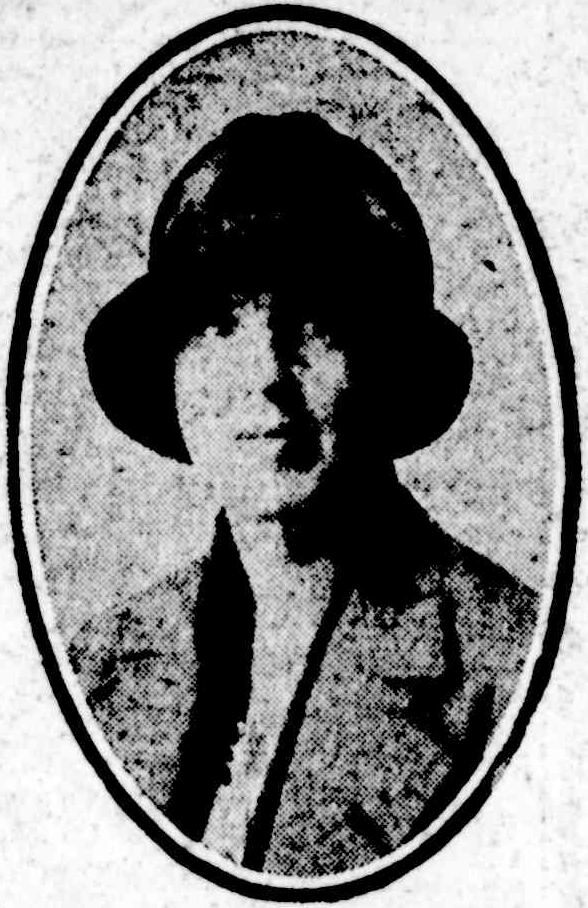
Nona Dumolo

Period	Details
1895–1907	Florence Green, Founder
1907	May Bird
1907–1913	Margaret Murray
1913–1917	Clarinda Murray
1918–1925	Juliet Lyon
1925–1939	Nona Dumolo
1939–1959	Ethel Colebrook
1959–1969	Loyalty Howard
1969–1972	Yvonne Grubb
1973–1989	Jan Milburn
1990–2000	Anna Abbott
2000–2004	Helen Trebilcock
2004	Denise Thomas, Interim Principal
2004–2006	Rebecca Ling
2007–2009	Mark Harrison
2009–2011	Ian Downs
2012	Peter Hodge
2013–2016	Clive Logan
2016–2020	Mary-Anne Evans
2020	Mark Flynn, Acting Principal
2021–2022	Kathy Bishop
2022–current	Liz van Genderen

== Campus ==
NEGS is situated on over 50 hectares (124 acres) of landscaped gardens and parkland, in a rural environment. The school is located in the city of Armidale, situated midway between Sydney and Brisbane on the New England Tablelands of New South Wales.

Some notable current facilities of the school include:

- The NEGS Multi-Purpose Centre (MPC) with gymnasium facilities
- The Aytoun Young Resource Centre
- Arts and Crafts complex
- All-weather tennis courts
- Several sports ovals
- Indoor and outdoor netball and basketball courts
- International standard synthetic hockey field
- Indoor and outdoor Equestrian arenas
- Equestrian cross-country course
- Polocrosse field
- Computer laboratory
- Library
- Four Boarding Houses
- Health Centre
- Chapel of St Michael and All Angels

== Badge ==
The New England Girls' School badge was designed shortly after the opening of the school, and is highly symbolic. The badge colours of scarlet and sky were chosen by Miss Green to be the official school colours. The shield of the badge is surmounted by the Bishop's mitre symbolising the power of the Holy Spirit, and the authority of the Church. On the shield itself, three figures are depicted:

- The seated lady is Charity or Mother Love.
- The dove is Hope, while the olive branch represents Peace.
- The open Bible on the Cross represents Faith.

All three together are drawn from the final verse of the school Bible reading:

So faith, hope and love abide, these three; but the greatest of these is love.

— 1 Corinthians 13:1–13

Beneath the shield is the school motto, Quodcumque facitis ex animo operamini, based on Colossians 3:23, which may be translated as "Whatsoever you do, do it heartily".

== Coursework ==
All pupils at NEGS follow the NSW academic curriculum, completing numeracy and literacy tests in junior school, and the NSW Higher School Certificate in year twelve. Senior school students are also tested in all of their subjects at the middle and end of each academic year, allowing classes in English and Mathematics to be streamed according to ability.

In the coeducational junior school, students study English, Mathematics, HSIE, PDHPE and technology with their classroom teachers. They also learn languages (German, French or Latin), Music, Drama and Art from specialist teachers in the senior school.

Girls in the senior school have the opportunity to develop their interests through taking additional study units and their class choices. Girls select a language to learn in year eight, two elective subjects in year nine (choosing from Art, Music, Drama, French, Japanese or Design and Technology) and may change one of these subjects at the beginning of year ten. In years eleven and twelve classes are also offered at Vocational Education Training (VET), the Armidale Combined Schools Program and the Open High School to allow girls to further pursue their interests and prepare for tertiary education and their chosen careers.

== Boarding ==
NEGS has four boarding houses – Kirkwood, Dickens, White and Saumarez – to accommodate its many boarders. Boarders from years five to ten share a room with girls from their own year group, and all girls in years eleven and twelve have their own private room. In year twelve, girls move into Saumarez House. The senior boarding house allows girls to concentrate on their studies without the distraction of younger years and gives the girls more freedom with later bedtimes and more opportunities to visit town. Throughout their time at NEGS most girls will experience boarding in some way, either as a full boarder, part-time boarder or a casual stay. Boarding enhances the community feeling of the school and is a fun and friendly experience.

== Notable alumnae ==
Alumnae of NEGS are known as Old Girls and may elect to join the schools alumni association, the NEGS Old Girls' Union (NEGSOGU). Some notable NEGS Old Girls include:

- Ursula Hope McConnel – anthropologist
- Dame Bridget Margaret Ogilvie AC, DBE – scientist; visiting professor at the University College London
- Molly Taylor – racing driver
- Barbara Mary Vernon – playwright
- Judith Wright – Australian poet and author

== See also ==
- List of non-government schools in New South Wales
- List of boarding schools in Australia
- Board of Studies
