= Rod Chiswell =

Australian Anglican bishop and former civil engineer who is the Bishop of Armidale

The Right Reverend Rod Chiswell
- Bishop of Armidale
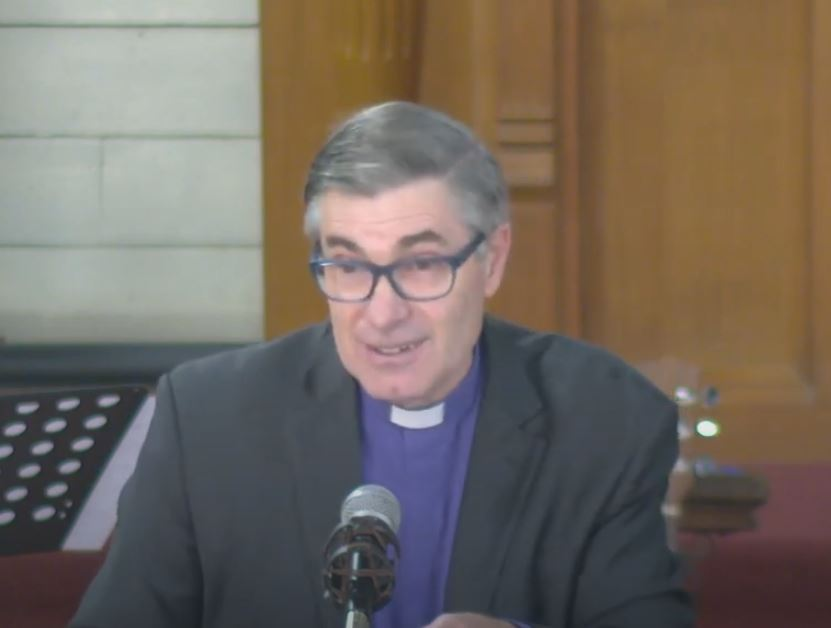
- Chiswell preaching in Narrabri in 2023.
- Church: Anglican Church of Australia
- Province: Province of New South Wales
- Diocese: Armidale
- Other posts: Rector of St Peter's, South Tamworth (2008–2020)

Personal details
- Born: Rodney James Chiswell Bingara, New South Wales, Australia
- Denomination: Anglicanism
- Parents: Peter and Betty Chiswell
- Spouse: Jenni
- Children: 2
- Education: University of New South Wales (civil engineering); Moore Theological College (theology)

Rodney James Chiswell is an Australian Anglican bishop and former civil engineer who has served as the Bishop of Armidale since 27 February 2021, a position which his father, Peter Chiswell, also held. He previously served as rector of St Peter's, South Tamworth, in the Diocese of Armidale from 2008 to 2020.

== Early life, education and parish ministry ==
Chiswell was born in Bingara to Peter and Betty Chiswell, as the youngest of three children. He spent the early years of his life in Gunnedah and was converted to Christianity at age eight, and attended high school in Armidale. After finishing school, Chiswell attended the University of New South Wales where he completed a Bachelor of Civil Engineering but also undertook ministry under the leadership of Philip Jensen. After graduation, Chiswell worked as a civil engineer, building roads and bridges with Moree Plains Shire for five years.

Chiswell returned to Sydney to study theology at Moore Theological College where he completed a Bachelor of Theology. He then spent the next 25 years serving in a number of parishes in the Armidale diocese - as vicar of Mungindi for seven years, vicar of Walcha for five years and vicar of South Tamworth for 13 years from 2008, a position which he held until his appointment to the episcopate.

== Episcopal ministry ==
On 12 December 2020, Chiswell was appointed as next Bishop of Armidale, succeeding Rick Lewers who had retired earlier in 2020. The diocese reported that Chiswell was selected in part because he understood the challenges facing a rural diocese, including the recruitment of clergy, support of clergy and their families, and the training of laypeople. Chiswell was consecrated as bishop and installed as Bishop of Armidale by the Archbishop of Sydney, Glenn Davies, at St Peter's Cathedral, Armidale, on 27 February 2021.

== Personal life ==
Chiswell is married to Jenni and has two children.

== Controversies ==
In July 2021, Chiswell advised two members of St Mary’s Anglican Church in West Armidale who were in a same sex marriage and involved in parish leadership that they would need to end their marriage to remain in a leadership role at the church. “Involvement in positions of ministry or other leadership … is conditional upon agreeing to the Faithfulness in Service code,” Chiswell said in a statement. Some parishioners, including the two men, left the parish.
