= Peter Brain =

Australian bishop

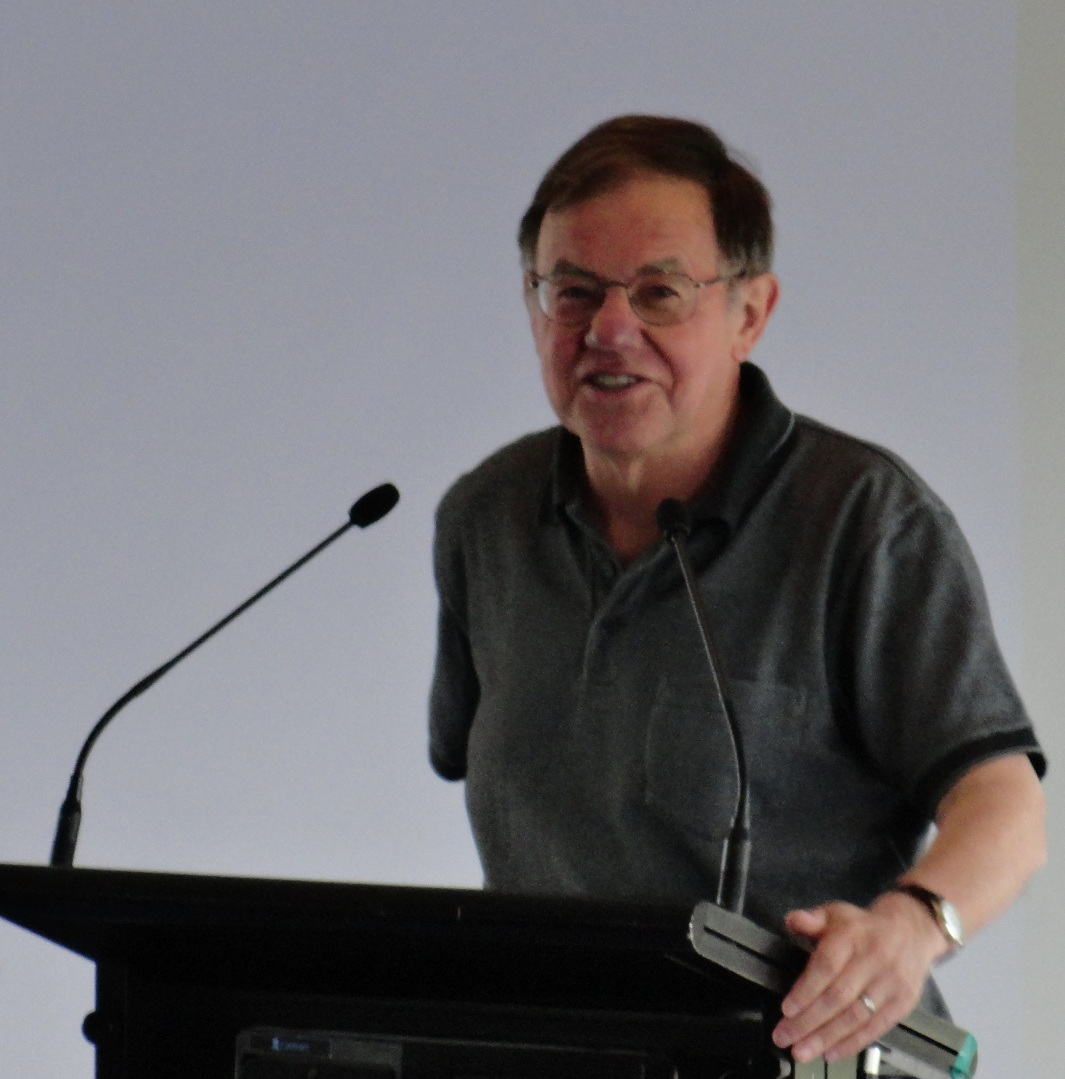
Brain in 2011

Peter Robert Brain (born 2 April 1947) is a retired bishop in the Anglican Church of Australia. He was Bishop of Armidale from 2000 until April 2012.

Brain was educated at North Sydney Technical High School.

Brain studied at Moore Theological College and was formerly rector of the Wanneroo parish in Western Australia. There he gained a reputation for encouraging his fellow clergy. He was also parish priest of St Luke's Maddington in Western Australia for many years.

The Armidale diocese has the reputation of having the highest proportion of Evangelical clergy of any Anglican diocese in the world (even higher, proportionally, than the Sydney diocese, which may be the largest Evangelical diocese in terms of total population).

Brain obtained a Doctor of Ministry degree from Fuller Theological Seminary. His doctoral work led him to write Going the Distance: How to Stay Fit for A Lifetime of Ministry, which achieved a "highly commended" in the 2004 Australian Christian Book of the Year awards.

Brain is married to Christine Brain with four children, including Matt Brain the current Bishop of Bendigo.

Anglican Communion titles
Preceded by Peter Chiswell	Bishop of Armidale; 2000–2012	Succeeded by Rick Lewers
