= James Turner (bishop) =

James Francis Turner (1829 – 27 April 1893) was a British clergyman and architect who served as the second Bishop of Grafton and Armidale in Australia.

== Early life and education ==
Turner was born in Yarmouth, Norfolk in 1829, the son of Lord Justice Sir George James Turner and Louisa Jones. He was educated at Charterhouse School, then apprenticed for four years in an architect's office.

In 1848 he matriculated at Durham University, where he graduated BA in 1851, licence in theology 1852, and MA in 1853. He was ordained deacon in 1852, and priest in 1853, by Edward Maltby.

== Clerical career ==
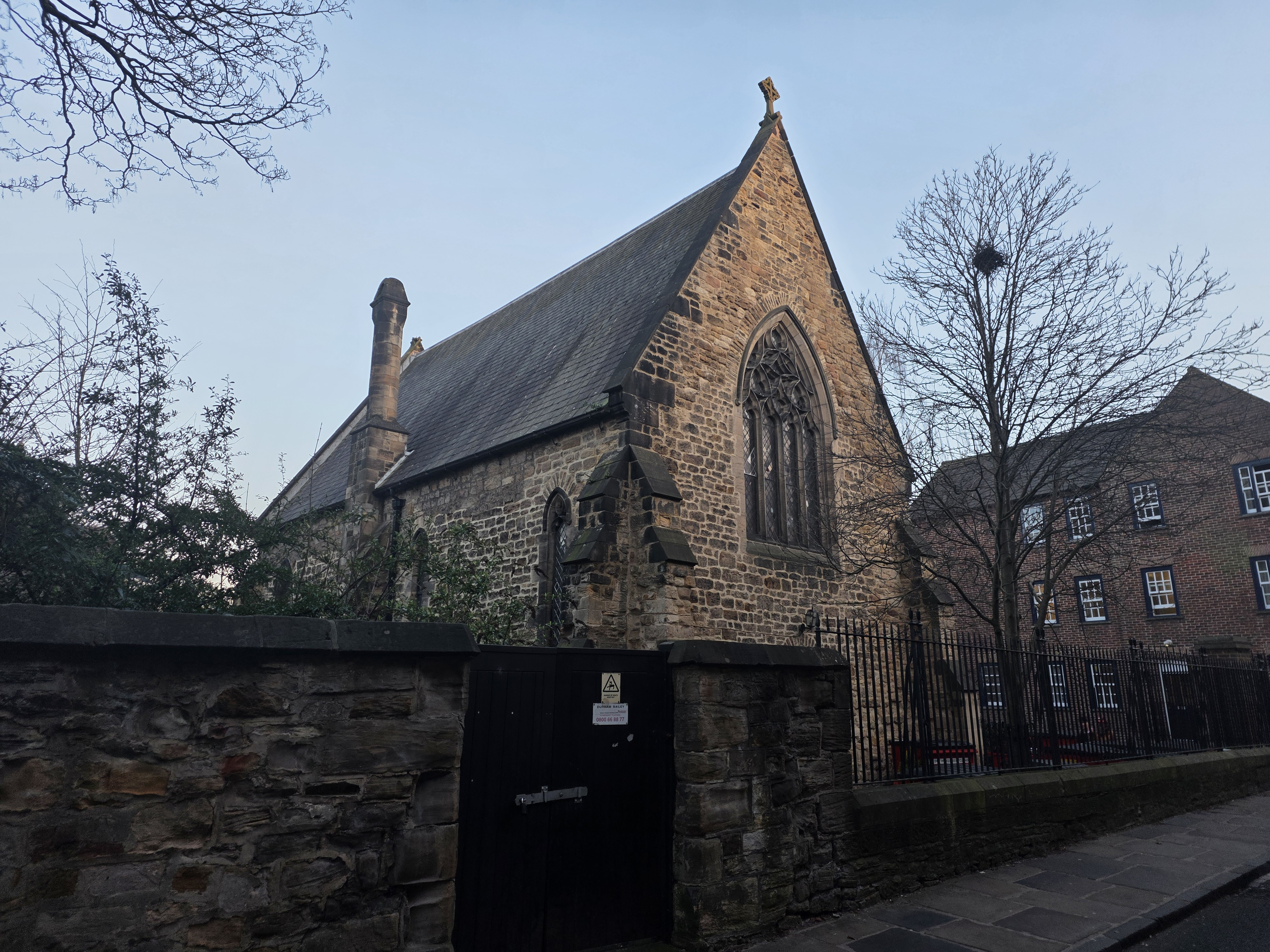
Chapel of Hatfield College, Durham, designed by Turner

From 1852-54, Turner was chaplain of Bishop Cosin's Hall in the University of Durham, where he also designed the chapel of Hatfield Hall.

He was curate of Walton, Somerset from 1857, then rector of North Tidworth from 1858, as well as rural dean of Amesbury from 1868.

He was appointed Bishop of Grafton and Armidale after the first appointed bishop, Collinson Sawyer, drowned shortly after taking up the office. He was consecrated a bishop on 24 February 1869 in Westminster Abbey, by Archibald Campbell Tait Archbishop of Canterbury, George Selwyn Bishop of New Zealand, and six other prelates. He was vice-president of the English Church Union, an Anglo-Catholic group.

In late 1892, he resigned his post due to illness; on his way back to England, he died in Rome, aged 64, and is buried in the Protestant Cemetery, Rome.

== Notes ==
Anglican Communion titles
Preceded by William Collinson Sawyer	Bishop of Grafton and Armidale; 1869–1893	Succeeded by Arthur Vincent Green
