= King George V Graving Dock =

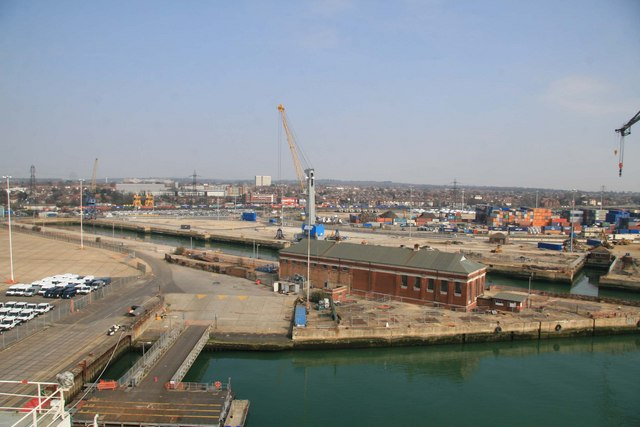

- Location within Southampton
- Former names: No. 7 Dry Dock

General information
- Type: Dock
- Architectural style: Concrete
- Location: Southampton Docks
- Coordinates: 50°54′35″N 1°26′30″W
- Construction started: 1933
- Completed: 1934
- Inaugurated: 26 July 1933
- Cost: > £2,000,000
- Owner: Associated British Ports

Design and construction
- Architect: Francis Wentworth-Shields
- Main contractor: John Mowlem & Company & Edmund Nuttall Sons & Company

King George V Graving Dock, also known as No. 7 Dry Dock, is a former dry dock situated in Southampton's Western Docks. It was designed by F.E. Wentworth-Shields and constructed by John Mowlem & Company and Edmund Nuttall Sons & Company. It was formally opened by King George V and Queen Mary on 26 July 1933 although the final construction work was only complete the following year. At the time of construction it was the largest graving dock in the world, a status it retained for nearly thirty years. In 2005, the caisson gates and keel blocks were removed, converting the dock to a permanent wet dock.

== Construction and design ==
The dock was built as part of the westward expansion of Southampton Docks, then owned by the Southern Railway. There had previously been several dry docks in the port, each larger than its predecessor, but a larger dock was needed to accommodate the new passenger liners which were coming into service, including RMS Queen Mary (1,019 ft (311 m)) and RMS Queen Elizabeth (1,031 ft (314 m)). The new dock cost more than £2,000,000 to construct.

The design of dry docks had evolved to mirror developments in ship design. Until the end of the 19th century most ships had curved hulls, so dry docks were built with curved or semi-circular cross-sections, with steps (known as "altars") built in to support the wooden props which held the hull of the vessel in place. By the 1930s, ships were built with near-vertical sides; this was reflected in the design of the new dock which has steep sides with a restricted number of stepped altars, at the base of the walls. High-level altars were not required as the large ships could dock on three lines of blocks without the need for shoring.

The new dock was designed by F.E. Wentworth-Shields and constructed by John Mowlem & Company and Edmund Nuttall Sons & Company. The dock took two years to build and required the removal of two million tons of earth. The dock was built virtually entirely of concrete, with granite dressings for the sills and caisson stops, the flights of steps leading to the floor and the coping of the walls at the entrance. The dock is 1,200 ft (366 m) long, 135 ft (41 m) wide and over 50 ft (15 m) deep and was capable of holding 58,000,000 imp gal (264,000,000 L; 70,000,000 US gal) of water. The floor of the dock is 25 ft (8 m) thick at the centre line, tapering to 17.5 ft (5.3 m) thick at the sides. The dock was provided with bollards at regular intervals on either side with others set into the dock walls. The caisson door, which weighed 4,000 long tons (4,100 t), slid sideways into a chamber at the right (east) of the entrance from the River Test. At 200 ft (61 m) intervals, there are vertical buttresses projecting from the sides of the dock; these prevented the bilge keels of vessels striking the base of the walls. The faces of the piers were protected to a depth of 10 ft (3.0 m) below the top with elm fenders.

The adjacent pump house held four pumps which could empty the dock in just over four hours.

=== Pumping station ===
The pumping station, at the western side of the dock, was also probably designed by F.E. Wentworth-Shields. It is a rectangular block building, with a half-hipped roof, built of red brick with stone dressing in the "inter-war classical revival style suggesting a temple". The building has a stone cornice and a second stone band above the windows, which are separated by brick pilasters. The original west bay, which housed an office, has been demolished.

Internally, the pumphouse walls are lined with cream and green tiles on the lower part. A wooden staircase leads to a mezzanine balcony with a wooden balustrade. In the main, southern part of the building, there are the four pumps which pumped water out of the dock.

As well as a Pumping station the building also served as an electric substation.

== Opening ==
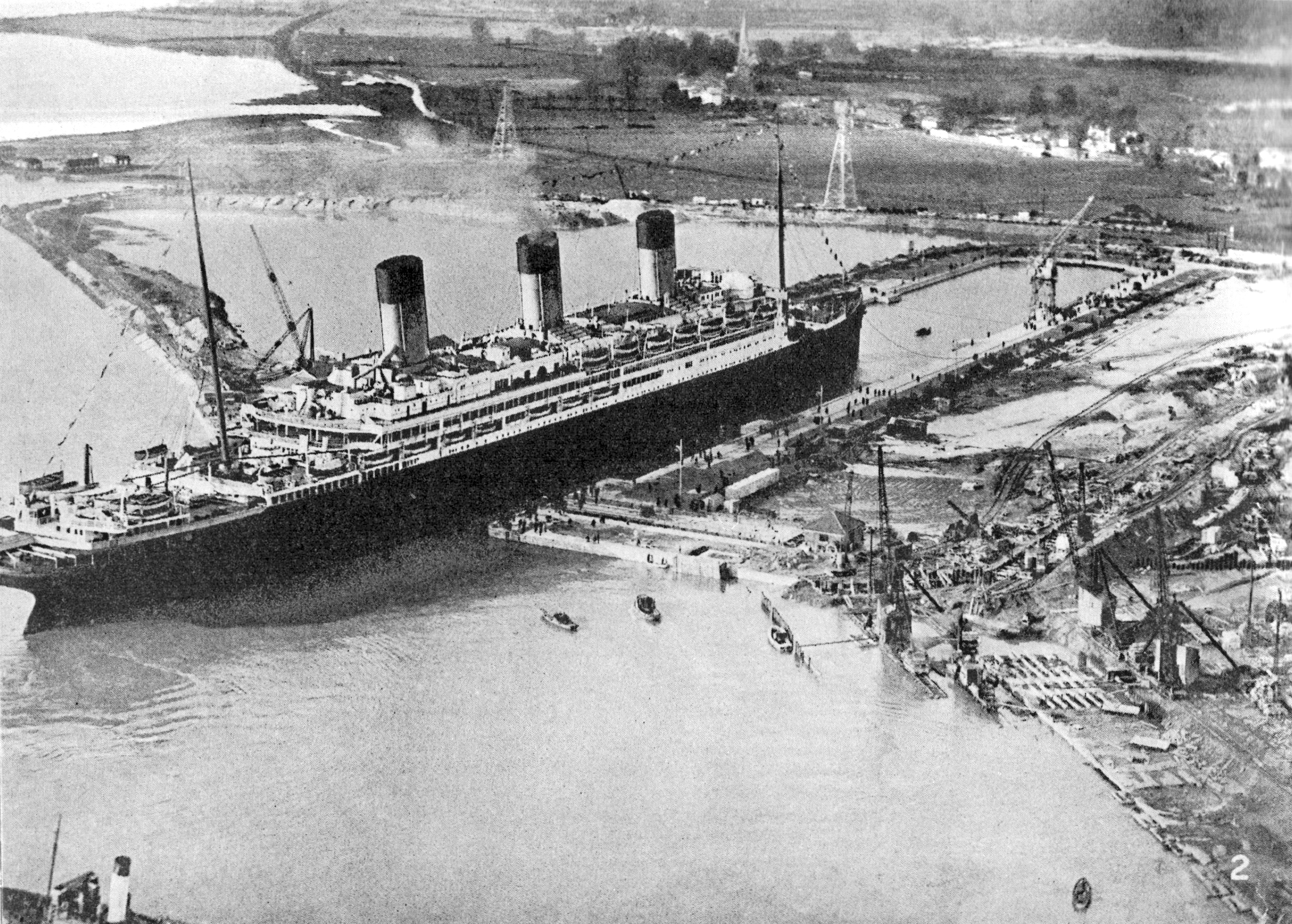
Majestic entering the dock shortly after opening.

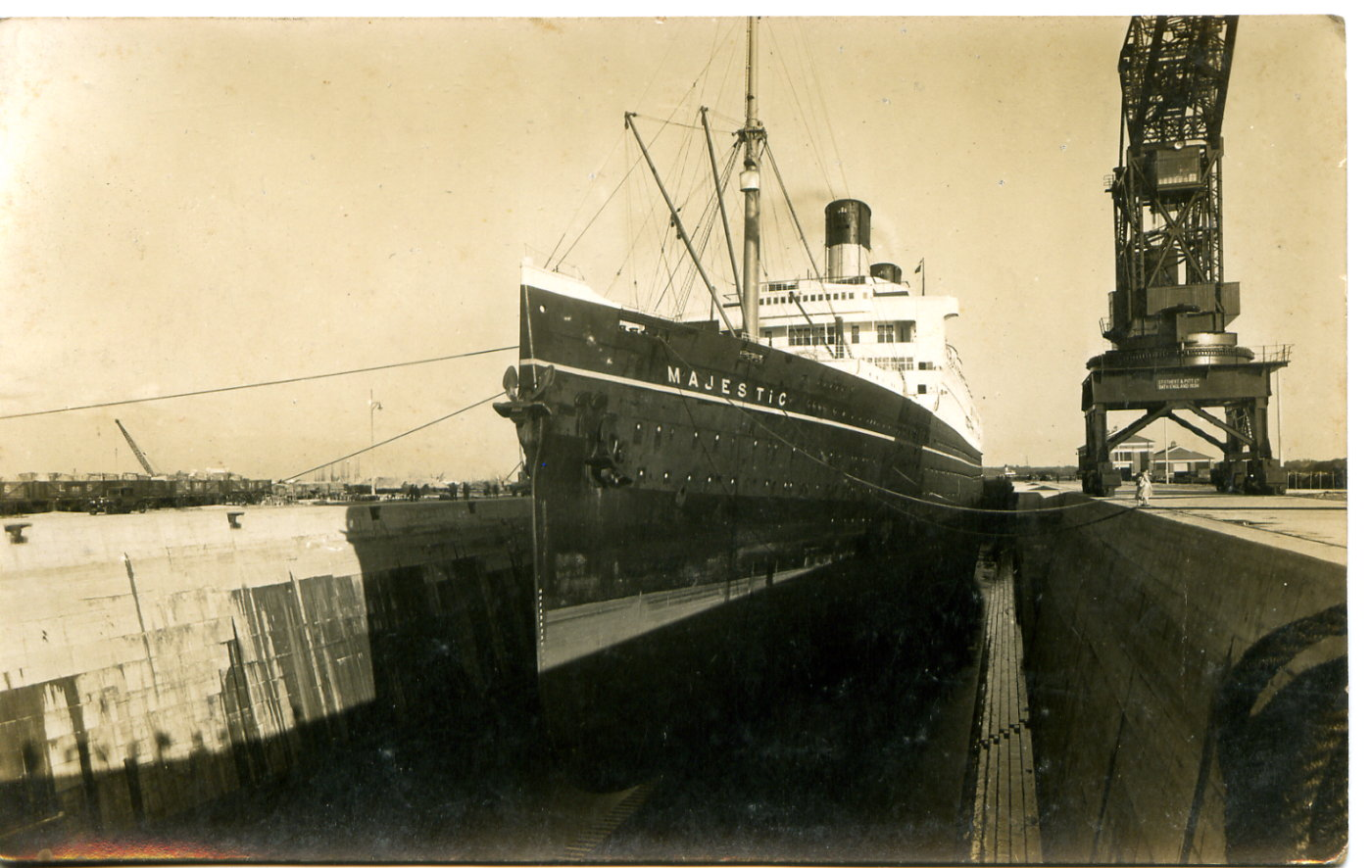
RMS Majestic in King George V dry dock

The dock was opened on 26 July 1933 when the Royal Yacht Victoria and Albert, with King George V and Queen Mary on board, broke a red, white and blue ribbon stretched across the entrance as she sailed into the incomplete dock. During the naming ceremony, Queen Mary emptied a cup of "Empire" wine into the dock.

The first ship to use the dock was White Star's Majestic in 1934.

== World War II ==
In the spring of 1942, the dock was used for training the commandos who were to take part in the raid on the French port of St. Nazaire. The King George V dock was very similar in design and construction to the Normandie dry dock at St. Nazaire, thus enabling the commandos to familiarise themselves with the construction of the dock. The men practised descending the stairs of the pumping chamber in the dark and setting explosives against the pump mechanism; they also practised climbing inside the hollow caisson to set explosives and setting charges against the gate winding machinery. In the raid itself, the obsolete destroyer HMS Campbeltown was rammed into the Normandie dock gates and exploded, while the commandos destroyed the dock machinery.

In 1944, the dock was engaged in the building of Bombardon breakwaters which were to be used as temporary floating breakwaters to protect the Mulberry harbours during the Allied invasion of Normandy.

== Decline and closure ==
In 2005, Associated British Ports agreed to terminate the lease on the dock to the then operators, ship repairers A&P Group, following which the caisson gates and keel blocks were removed, converting the dock to a permanent wet dock. The dock was then used in conjunction with the bulk-handling terminal at Berths 107 to 109, operated by Solent Stevedores.

In April 2012, there was a large fire in scrap metal stored at the dock, which resulted in a large cloud of smoke over the city for several days. A few weeks later, there was another incident at the dock when firefighters were called to attend a pile of wood chips which were releasing steam vapour.

== Listed building ==
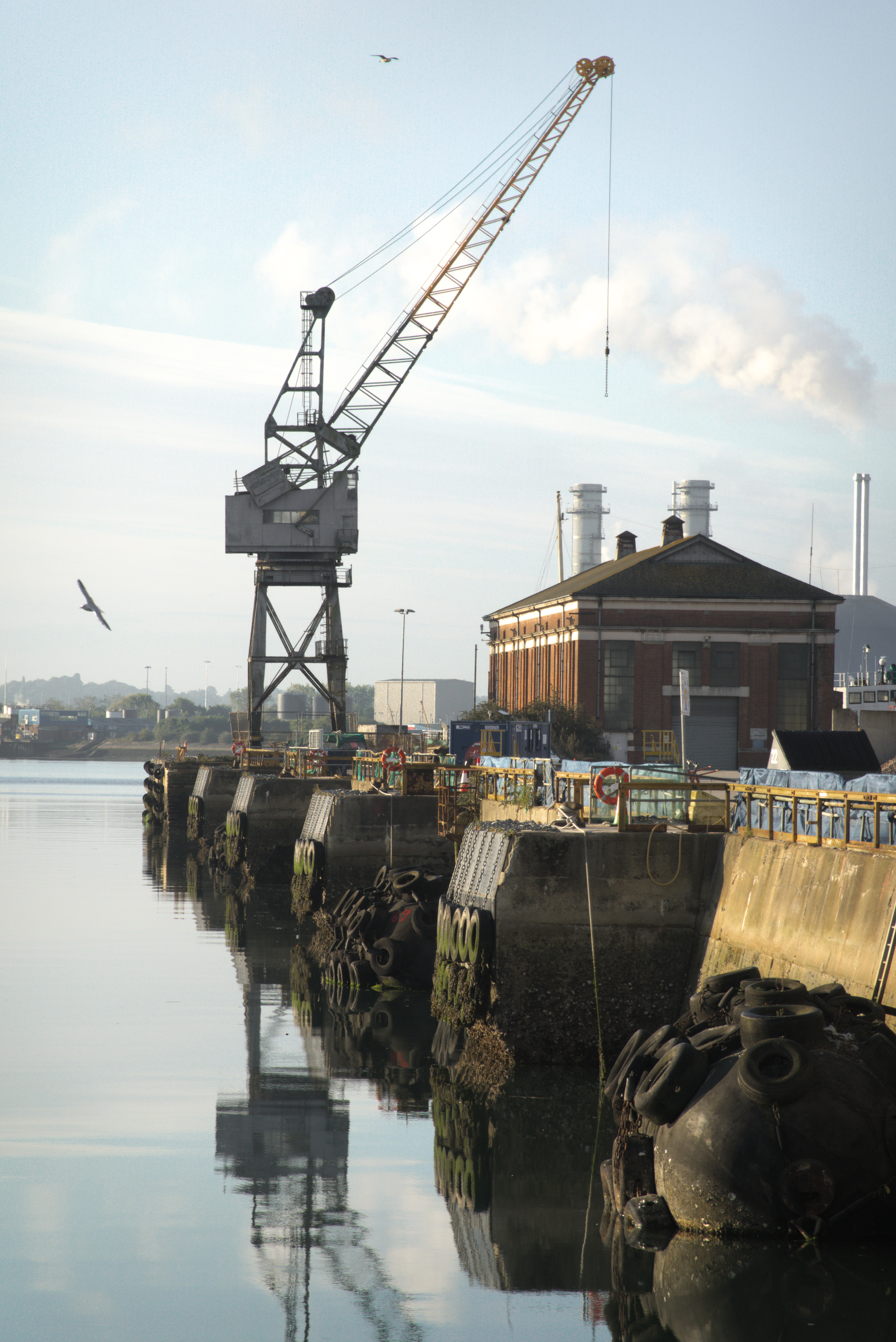
2024: No.7 Pumping Station, Quay Crane, and Fenders

In June 2006, despite the gates having been removed, the dock and the adjacent pump house were both granted Grade II listed building status. In the listing for the dock, English Heritage summarised its historical importance:

King George V Graving Dock has special historic interest both locally and nationally as a rare survival from the heyday of the transatlantic liner era. It has special architectural interest as a good example of the evolution of dock design as it stood in the mid-20th century, innovative in its construction. The dock has associations with great ships and events important in British history, and was the most significant dry dock in one of Britain's leading ports.

Of the pump house, they said:

The inter-war classical style is impressive and temple-like, and the interior is exceptional for its survival of fixtures and fittings. Although there have been some alterations to the periphery of the building, its function is amply illustrated by the surviving features and its architectural presence offsets the largely below-ground dock.
