= Collinson Sawyer =

Australian bishop (1831–1868)

The Right Reverend William Collinson Sawyer
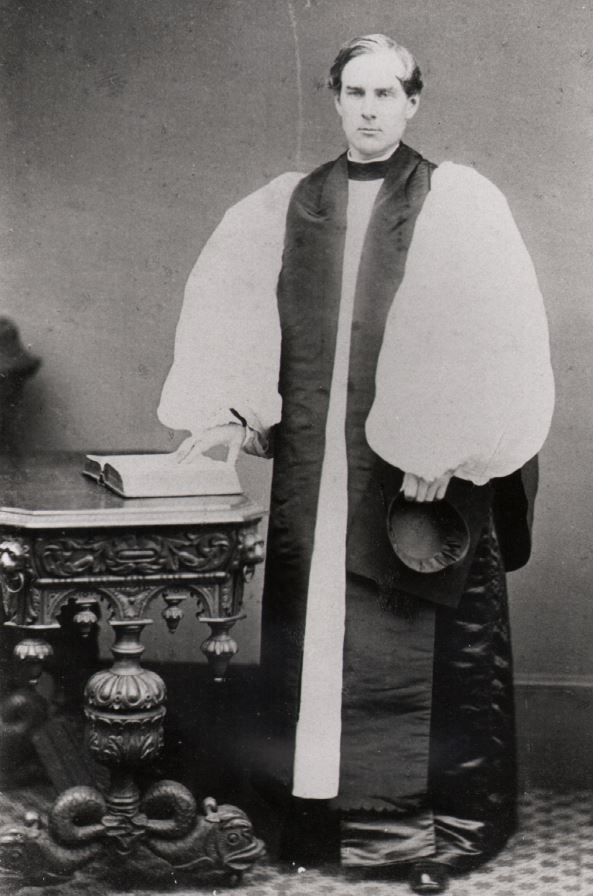
- William Collinson Sawyer
- Title: Bishop of Grafton and Armidale

Personal life
- Born: 30 August 1831 Hedon, East Riding of Yorkshire, England
- Died: 15 March 1868 (aged 36) New South Wales

Religious life
- Religion: Anglican
- Consecration: 2 February 1867

Senior posting

William Collinson Sawyer (1831 – 15 March 1868) was a colonial Anglican bishop in the third quarter of the nineteenth century.

== Education ==
He was born in 1831 and educated at Abingdon School, from 1845 to 1850 and Oriel College, Oxford.

== Career ==
After some years as the Vicar of Tunbridge Wells, he was appointed the inaugural Bishop of Grafton and Armidale in Australia on 30 January 1867 and consecrated to the episcopate at Canterbury Cathedral on the Feast of the Purification (2 February 1867), by Charles Longley, Archbishop of Canterbury. Around three months over taking charge of the diocese, he died by drowning when his boat was upset in the Clarence River on Sunday 15 March 1868.

== See also ==
- List of Old Abingdonians

Religious titles
New diocese	Bishop of Grafton and Armidale; 1867– 1868	Succeeded by James Turner
