= Community of St. Denys =

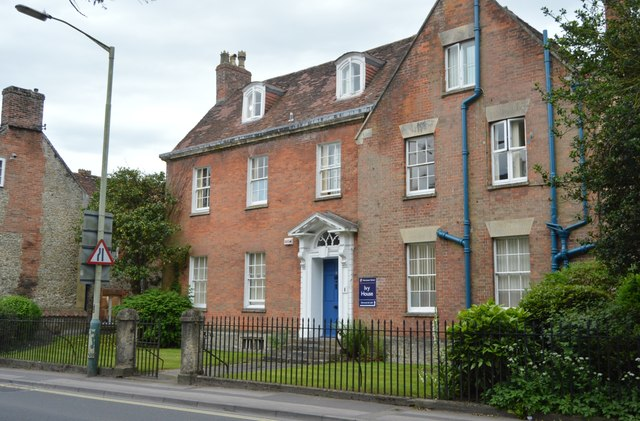
Ivy House, Warminster, run by the order as a retreat, 1973–2014

The Community of St Denys (CSD) was an Anglican religious order of nuns founded in 1879, under the jurisdiction of the Diocese of Salisbury of the Church of England. The community was established to engage in domestic and foreign missionary work, and latterly was engaged in adult education, parish ministry, spiritual guidance, and leading retreats.

The order was founded by Sir James Erasmus Philipps, 12th Baronet, vicar of St Denys' Church, Warminster from 1859 to 1897. The order was under the patronage of Dionysius the Areopagite.

From 1890 the nuns ran St Monica's School for Girls, which had a boarding house in an 18th-century building on Vicarage Street. The school merged with Lord Weymouth's Grammar School in 1973 to form Warminster School; there was also an Orphanage of Pity until 1959. In 1994, the address of the convent was given as Vicarage Street.

Ivy House on Church Street, another 18th-century house used by the girls' school, was operated as a retreat until 2014 when it was sold to Warminster School. The former convent had already been bought by the school in 1996.

Around 2007, the order was described as a dispersed community. Until 1973 a satellite community of three sisters worked in the parish of Chiswick, London, occupying a small cottage opposite St Nicholas Church which is still named St Denys' House.

In 2019, the sole surviving sister in vows – Frances Ann – was living in a retirement home in Salisbury. There were also eight oblates and five fellowship members. Frances Ann died in June 2024.

There is a registered charity of the same name, governed by a board of trustees and with an address in Warminster, Wiltshire. The charity gives away the surplus income from its investments in the form of grants to suitable projects, which in 2018–2019 totalled £130,000.
