= Clive Kerle =

Australian bishop (1915–1997)

Ronald Clive Kerle (28 December 1915 – 5 April 1997) was an Australian Anglican bishop.

Kerle was educated at the University of Sydney and ordained in 1939. His first positions were curacies at St Paul's Sydney and St Anne's Ryde. He then held incumbencies in Kangaroo Valley and Port Kembla. Later he was General Secretary of the New South Wales branch of the Church Missionary Society and then Archdeacon of Cumberland. From 1956 to 1965 he was Bishop Co-adjutor of Sydney when he became Bishop of Armidale, a position he held for 11 years. His final position until his retirement in 1982 was as Rector of St Swithun's Pymble.

Anglican Communion titles
Preceded by John Moyes	Bishop of Armidale; 1965– 1976	Succeeded by Peter Chiswell
