= St Peter's Cathedral, Armidale =

- Anglican Cathedral Church of St Peter Apostle and Martyr; St Peter's Anglican Cathedral; St Peter, Apostle & Martyr Cathedral
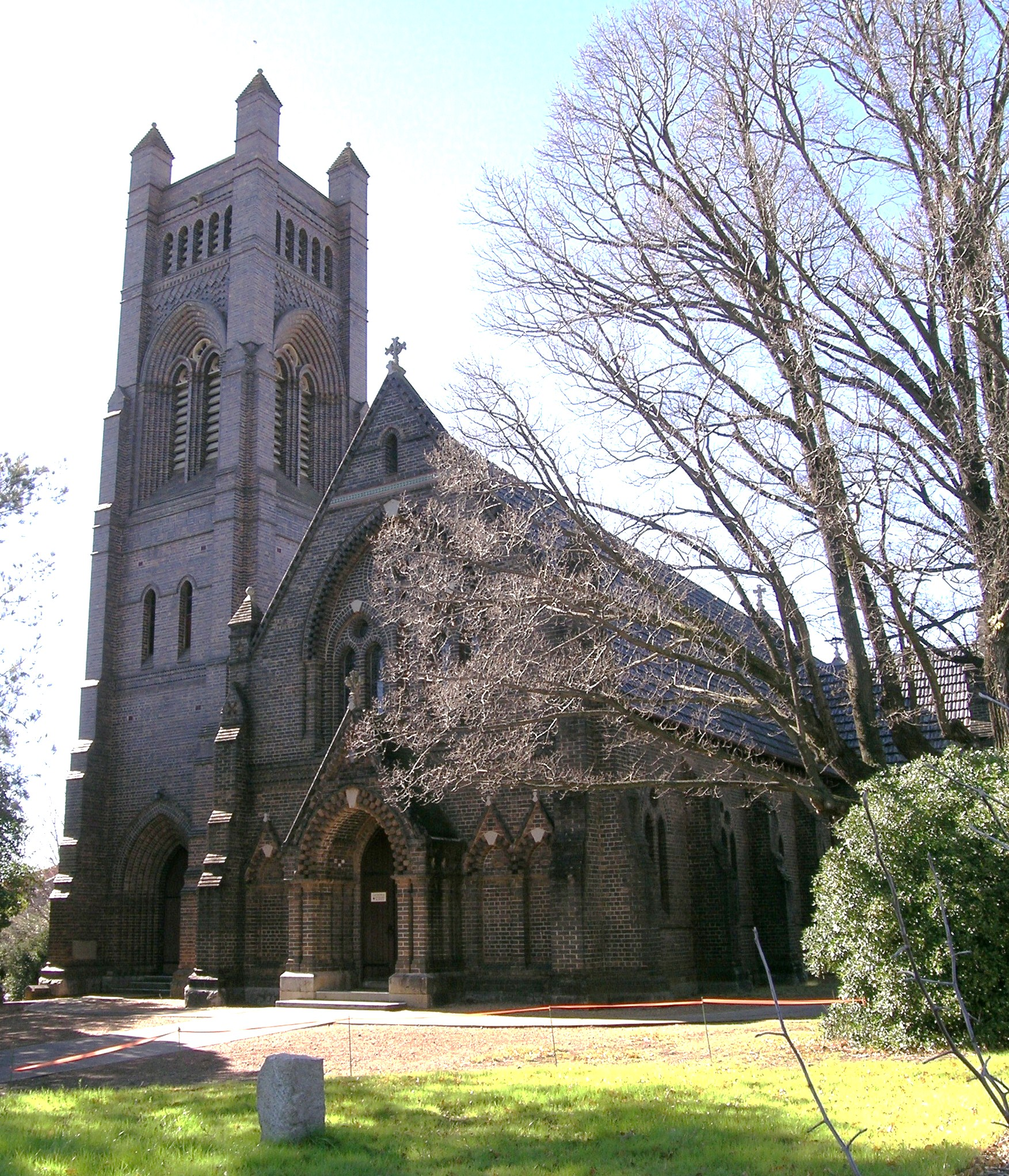
- St Peter's Cathedral, pictured in 2008

- Location in New South Wales
- 30°30′54″S 151°39′57″E
- Location: 122 Rusden Street, Armidale, Armidale Regional Council, New South Wales
- Country: Australia
- Denomination: Anglican
- Website: stpetersarmidale.org.au

History
- Status: Cathedral
- Founded: 1845
- Founder: James Francis Turner
- Dedication: Saint Peter the Apostle
- Consecrated: 1875 by James Francis Turner

Architecture
- Functional status: Active
- Architects: John Horbury Hunt; James Francis Turner
- Architectural type: Victorian Academic Gothic
- Years built: 1871–1938

Specifications
- Materials: Armidale blue brick; Uralla granite

Administration
- Diocese: Armidale

Clergy
- Dean: Chris Brennan

New South Wales Heritage Register
- Official name: Anglican Cathedral Church of St Peter Apostle and Martyr Precinct; St Peter's Anglican Cathedral; St Peter; Apostle & Martyr Cathedral
- Type: State heritage (built)
- Designated: 12 March 2014
- Reference no.: 1924
- Type: Cathedral
- Category: Religion

St Peter's Cathedral is an Anglican cathedral with heritage-listed building and grounds at 122 Rusden Street, Armidale, Armidale Regional Council, New South Wales, Australia. It is the mother church of the Anglican Diocese of Armidale. and the seat of the Anglican Bishop of Armidale. The cathedral was designed by John Horbury Hunt and Bishop James Francis Turner and built from 1871 to 1938. It is also known as the Anglican Cathedral Church of St Peter Apostle and Martyr. It was added to the New South Wales State Heritage Register on 12 March 2014.

St Peter's is located between the town hall and Central Park and diagonally opposite the Roman Catholic Church's Cathedral of St Mary and St Joseph.

== History ==
Religion and the establishment of places of worship have played an important role in the colonial expansion and settlement of New South Wales. As the boundaries of the colony expanded and settlers pushed into previously unestablished areas, the government ensured religion followed to cater for the spiritual education and morality of the settlers.

As for the Northern Tablelands region, European settlement came as early as 1832 as pastoralists searched beyond the colonial boundaries for new land on which to run their stock. At this time, the early settlers of the district were in fact illegal squatters who only gained colonial approval to work the land in 1836 with the passing of legislation recognizing the pastoralist's rights to graze (but not own) the land (for an annual fee of ten pounds).

Religion soon followed the pastoralists into the newly declared township of Armidale (established in the late 1840s) with the first formal Christian service being held in 1845 by Bishop William Broughton, on his first and only visit to Armidale. Regarded as a suitable regional centre for religious and educational services, Broughton also announced during the visit the construction of St Peter's Anglican Church, the first church for the region.

Located on the site of the existing cathedral, the small timber church was opened for worship by 1850. As the population of the Northern Tablelands district expanded, the Anglican Diocese of Grafton and Armidale (one of the first outside of Sydney or Newcastle) was established in 1863.

Following the sudden passing of the first bishop for the diocese, the Reverend James Francis Turner was appointed as bishop and arrived in the parish in 1869. Bishop Turner was to maintain this post, leading the diocese, for 23 years.

Soon after arriving, it became apparent that St Peter's Church (although it had previously been extended) was unfit to accommodate the needs of the growing congregation. Being well informed on church architecture, having trained for four years at an architecture office in England before turning to theology, Turner recognised that an architect was required to address the pressing issues. Turner soon engaged John Horbury Hunt, a young (32 years) but reputable architect who, having arrived in Australia in 1863, has previously worked as assistant architect to Edmund Blacket, the Anglican diocesan architect and former colonial architect to New South Wales. Hunt also designed Booloominbah and Trevenna at the University of New England and cathedrals in the adjoining dioceses of Newcastle and Grafton.

After quickly determining that extending the existing church was unrealistic, Hunt faced the specific challenge of designing a cathedral that was suited to its setting and to the needs of the congregation as opposed to the more traditional church architecture modelled on the existing churches of England and Europe.

Hunt's original concept and alternative design, both stone and in the Anglo-French style, were largely in keeping with traditional church architecture of the period. Bishop Turner rejected both of these designs. With his limited experience but keen interest, Turner worked closely with Hunt to jointly design a cathedral that was "unlike no other (sic) Gothic building that existed in Australia in the 1870s".

Hunt was a prominent early exponent of the Arts and Crafts architectural style in Australia and had an existing interest in the decorative potential of using expressed but unadorned materials and Turner encouraged this departure from the traditional form of church buildings. Brick was selected and, although generally considered a common material used due to economic necessity rather than choice, Hunt devised a concept that skilfully incorporated intricate, elaborate and imaginative layering of patterned courses with a flying buttress, arching, toothing and moulded brickwork.

Although a small-scale cathedral, Hunt's design for the Anglican cathedral deliberately complicated rather than simplified the space and detailing. Again, the outcome was in direct contrast to the traditional architecture of the period.

From the outset, the cathedral was going to be a challenge to construct. Local contractors were engaged and, following Hunt's meticulously detailed directions, the cathedral was completed in 1875 and opened for worship.

Set on a generously landscaped corner site, the cathedral was built of locally sourced "Armidale Blue" brick from Saumarez, New England granite from Uralla and timber from the district. A landmark building in the Armidale township, the newly opened cathedral attracted a congregation of several hundred. Much of the fit-out and furnishing of the cathedral was designed by Bishop Turner and built to his specifications in England before being shipped to Australia and, as the railway to Armidale had not yet been developed, it is likely the furniture was received in Sydney or Newcastle before being transported over land to Armidale.

Although the cathedral was open for worship from 1875, allegedly "Bishop Turner would not allow it to be consecrated until 1886, when a 'worthy' pulpit and 'complete' flooring had been installed".

In 1896, the Hunter Pipe Organ (constructed in 1895 by Messrs A. Hunter & Son in England) was installed. It replaced an earlier organ installed by George Fincham and Sons in 1878.

Although Hunt's final design for the site incorporated a baptistry, chapel, extension of the sanctuary and central roof lantern dome, most plans remained unfulfilled due to the constrained financial position of the diocese. However, to Hunt's original designs, the deanery was completed in 1892 and the vestry and chapter house in 1910 - both in the same "Armidale Blue" brick as the cathedral.

Hunt designed four different versions of the deanery building and the last, and most modest design, was constructed on the site of the original parsonage.

Finally, the belltower was constructed in 1938 when local builder G. F. Nott offered to supply the bricks free of charge. Although the "Armidale Blue" brick had long since been exhausted, a similar brick was used to match the existing cathedral. At this time, Hunt's original 1872 timber bell tower was demolished and the existing bell ('Maud') rehung in the new tower.

The Hunter pipe organ underwent major repair works in 1978 due to water damage from overflowing roof drainage. It then underwent major restorations in 1996, with the pipe work thoroughly overhauled, cleaned and repaired, missing pipes replaced, an improvement in the tonal condition, soundboards repaired, keyboards reconditioned, and casework repaired and repolished. It received a full service in 2008.

== Description ==
The cathedral precinct was reported to be in very good condition upon an inspection on 18 April 2013.

=== Grounds ===
The cathedral and deanery building are centrally sited on a large corner block facing Central Park and two other streets. Broadly the grounds are grassed with mature trees.

Three rare and choice trees in the grounds are Mediterranean strawberry trees (Arbutus andrachnoides), with bright cinnamon red smooth bark: two near the main front door on the cathedral's west; one on the northern side nearer the rectory.

=== Cathedral ===
The Anglican Cathedral Church of St Peter Apostle and Martyr may not be the largest cathedral but it is one of John Horbury Hunt's finest works. Built in the Victorian Academic Gothic style, distinctly different from his more common Anglo-French designs, the cathedral was a collaborative and successful early experiment in the use of expressed common brick rather than the more traditional stone material.

This delicate but complex small-scale cathedral was completed in 1875 and demonstrates Hunt's architectural style in its imaginative design and complicated but skilfully used pointing, layered courses, patterned decorations and arches and toothed lancet windows.

A broad and low proportioned building, the cathedral is finished with custom-made furnishings and ornaments designed by Bishop Turner, built and shipped from England.

=== Deanery ===
The cathedral is complemented by the 1892 deanery building, designed by Hunt and constructed in the same Armidale Blue brick. With its arched windows and gable roof (once slate but now tile), the two-storey deanery building uses the same materials and architectural design points as the cathedral.

When the cathedral was finished in 1938 with the construction of the square tower built to Hun'ts design, the Armidale Blue brick had been exhausted by this time and a similar material was used.

In addition to the deanery, the historic Anglican cathedral precinct also includes the St Peters Church Hall, Diocesan Registry, bookshop and surrounding landscaping and fencing.

== Heritage listing ==
The Anglican Cathedral Church of St Peter Apostle and Martyr Precinct is of state heritage significance as the first cathedral constructed in the regional colonial outpost of Armidale to serve the religious needs of the expanding settlement and population. The cathedral would also become the centre for the Diocese of Armidale and Grafton (created in 1863, this was one of the first dioceses to be established outside of Sydney or Newcastle). Today, the cathedral continues to be the centre of the Anglican Diocese of Armidale.

Built and opened for worship in 1875, the cathedral was a collaborative design by the prominent architect John Horbury Hunt and Bishop James Francis Turner. The cathedral design used expressed and unadorned brick (a common and under appreciated material at the time) to create layers of patterned courses with a single flying buttress, arching, toothing and moulded brickwork. The final achievement was an intricate, elaborate and imaginative building that was distinctly different from the traditional church form and character of the period.

While not a large building, the cathedral was the first significant brick church construction of John Horbury Hunt and is regarded as being one of his finest works. The design deliberately complicated rather than simplified the space and detailing and by celebrating the structural and decorative nature of brickwork, Hunt and Turner created a building that was "unlike no other (sic) Gothic building that existed in Australia in the 1870s".

The cathedral is complemented by the 1892 deanery building, also designed by Hunt using the same materials and designs. This is one of the few Hunt-designed church residences in NSW.

This regional cathedral precinct is also significant as it demonstrates the religious requirements of the district and holds important and ongoing social significance for the community and Anglican congregation of Armidale and the wider Northern Tablelands district.

Anglican Cathedral Church of St Peter Apostle and Martyr Precinct was listed on the New South Wales State Heritage Register on 12 March 2014 having satisfied the following criteria.

The place is important in demonstrating the course, or pattern, of cultural or natural history in New South Wales.

The Anglican Cathedral Church of St Peter Apostle and Martyr Precinct is of state heritage significance as the first cathedral for the regional colonial outpost of Armidale. On the site of the very first Anglican church for the region (1850), the cathedral was constructed in 1871-75 to serve the religious needs of the growing community and to serve as the centre for the Diocese of Armidale and Grafton. The diocese had formed in 1863 and was one of the first to be established outside of the colonial settlements of Sydney and Newcastle.

The place has a strong or special association with a person, or group of persons, of importance of cultural or natural history of New South Wales's history.

The Anglican Cathedral Church of St Peter Apostle and Martyr Precinctis of state heritage significance for its association with Bishop James Francis Turner and John Horbury Hunt.

Bishop Turner was the second bishop appointed for the Anglican Diocese of Grafton and Armidale but was the first bishop to have a significant influence on the operation of the Armidale parish. Turner was well informed about church architecture and, having had his own architectural training as a youth, he worked closely with the architect John Horbury Hunt to jointly design a cathedral that was unlike any other Gothic structure in Australia at the time and a distinct departure from the form and character of traditional church architecture for the period. Bishop Turner was also responsible for custom-designing much of the furnishings for the cathedral which were built to his specifications in England before being transported to Australia.

While not a large building, this cathedral is the first significant brick church construction of John Horbury Hunt and is regarded as being one of his finest works. Hunt was a prominent early exponent of the Arts and Crafts architectural style in Australia and his use of expressed common brick, by choice rather than economic necessity, was unique for the time. The intricate and elaborate detail of the cathedral design, and his celebration of the structural and decorative nature of brickwork, has become a defining characteristic of Hunt's architectural career.

Hunt was also responsible for the design of the deanery building within the precinct which was completed in 1892 and used the same materials and architectural design features as the cathedral.

The collaboration between Hunt and Turner was an intellectual and professional relationship that was to become a long lasting and fruitful partnership. In Turner, Hunt found his ideal client and patron who would encourage his artistic freedom and creative expression. Following the construction of the cathedral, John Horbury Hunt went on to design a number of Armidale's most noted buildings.

The place is important in demonstrating aesthetic characteristics and/or a high degree of creative or technical achievement in New South Wales.

The Anglican Cathedral Church of St Peter Apostle and Martyr Precinct is of state heritage significance for its aesthetic value.

Jointly designed by John Horbury Hunt and Bishop Turner, the architecture of the cathedral was a distinct departure from the traditional form and character of church architecture for the period and the outcome was a building that was "unlike no other (sic) Gothic building that existed in Australia in the 1870s".

Hunt's use of expressed and unadorned common brick, by choice rather than economic necessity, was unique at the time and the final construction celebrates the structural and decorative nature of brickwork by the skilful incorporation of intricate, elaborate and imaginative layering of patterned courses with a single flying buttress, arching, toothing and moulded brickwork.

While not a large building, this cathedral is regarded as being one of John Horbury Hunt's finest works.

The cathedral is complemented by the 1892 deanery building, also designed by John Horbury Hunt using the same Armidale Blue brick material and architectural design features. This is one of the few Hunt-designed church residences in NSW.

The place has strong or special association with a particular community or cultural group in New South Wales for social, cultural or spiritual reasons.

The Anglican Cathedral Church of St Peter Apostle and Martyr Precinct is of state heritage significance for its social value to the community and congregation of Armidale and the wider Northern Tablelands district.

From its settlement in the 1830s, Armidale was regarded in the colony as a suitable centre for the provision of religious services to the expanding and wide-reaching population.

The central position of the cathedral in the Armidale township, in conjunction with the adjacent Catholic Cathedral of St Mary and St Joseph and St Pauls Presbyterian Church, forms a landmark religious precinct that has significance and value to the community.

The place has potential to yield information that will contribute to an understanding of the cultural or natural history of New South Wales.

Sited on a previously undeveloped portion of land, there is potential for further investigation of the cathedral precinct site to reveal evidence of Aboriginal occupation of the Armidale region prior to the arrival of European settlers in the 1830s.

This potential for investigation would be relevant across the Armidale district.

The place possesses uncommon, rare or endangered aspects of the cultural or natural history of New South Wales.

Although the Anglican Cathedral Church of St Peter Apostle and Martyr precinct may not be a rare example of its type in NSW, the cathedral is a unique building due to the intricate and imaginative use of expressed unadorned brick to create a building of layered patterned courses with a flying buttress, arching, toothing and moulded brickwork.

The place is important in demonstrating the principal characteristics of a class of cultural or natural places/environments in New South Wales.

The Anglican Cathedral Church of St Peter Apostle and Martyr precinct is of state heritage significance as a representative example of a cathedral and public building designed by the prominent architect, John Horbury Hunt. A fine and unique example, the cathedral was a distinct departure from the traditional form and character of church architecture of the period and was a catalyst for later architectural use of common materials (particularly brick) in more decorative forms.

== Deans of Armidale ==
- 1946-1948 John Bell (subsequently Dean of St George's Cathedral, Perth, 1953-1959)
- 1949–1960 Matthew Kenneth Jones
- 1960-1969 Evan William Wetherell
- 1970-1977 Peter Frederick Newall
- 1978-1988 James Evans HOLBECK
- 2002–2014 Stephen Williams
- 2015–present: Chris Brennan

== See also ==
- List of Anglican cathedrals in Australia
