= Peter Chiswell (bishop) =

Australian Anglican bishop

Peter Chiswell (18 February 1934 – 6 December 2013) was a bishop of the Anglican Church of Australia. He was the Bishop of Armidale, in northern New South Wales, from 1976 to 1999.

Chiswell was educated at the University of New South Wales and ordained in 1959. He began his ordained ministry as a curate at Quirindi, New South Wales. He then held incumbencies in Bingara and Gunnedah. From 1971 to 1976 he was Archdeacon of Tamworth when he was ordained to the episcopate. He was a dedicated bushwalker and environmentalist. On 15 March 2012 the newly constructed hall at Calrossy Anglican School Boys Campus was named the Bishop Peter Chiswell Hall in recognition of his part in the school's history.

Chiswell was married to Betty and had three children. His youngest child, Rodney (Rod) Chiswell, was installed as Bishop of Armidale in 2021.

Anglican Communion titles
| Preceded by Ronald Clive Kerle | Bishop of Armidale; 1976– 1999 | Succeeded by Peter Robert Brain |
