= Henry Cooper (bishop) =

Australian Anglican bishop

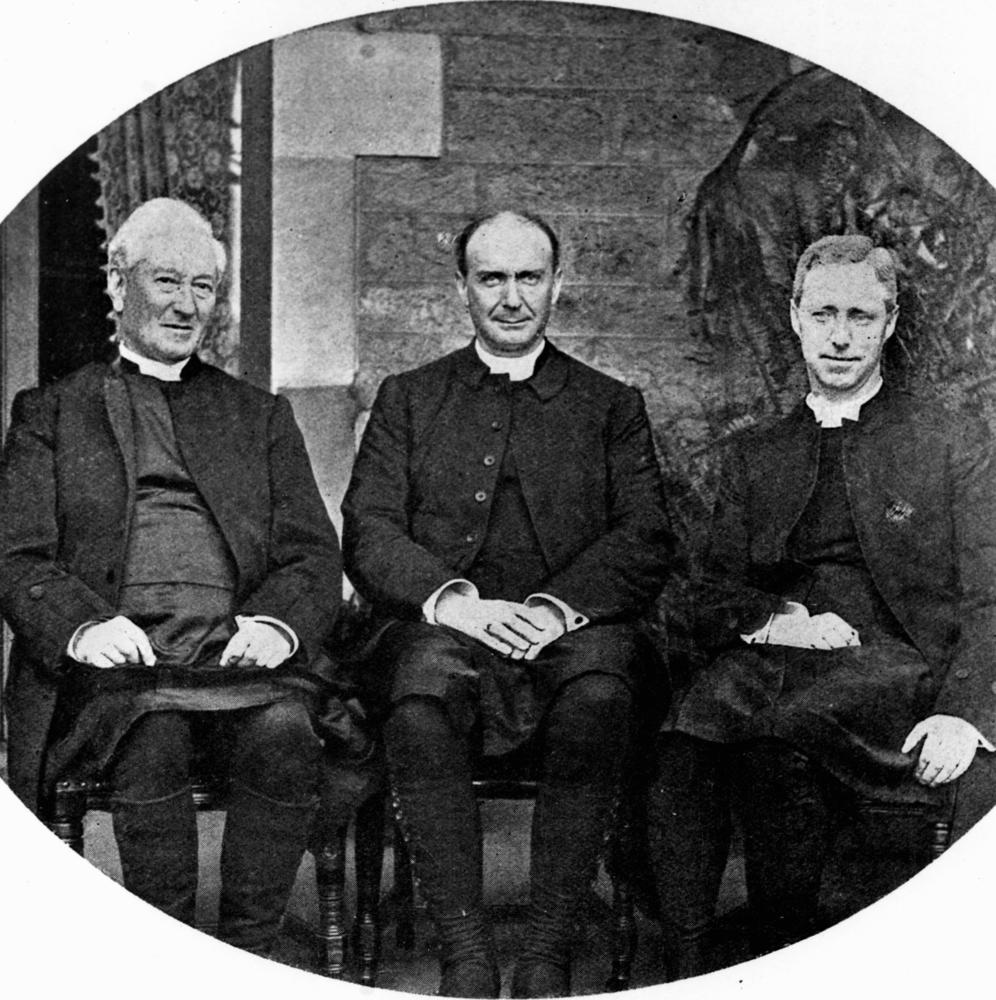
Consecration of Dr. G. D. Halford as Bishop of Rockhampton, 1909. Left to right: Bishop Henry Cooper (Grafton), Archbishop St. Clair Donaldson (Brisbane), and Bishop George Halford.

Henry Edward Cooper (15 October 1845 – 1 July 1916) was an Anglican bishop in Australia.

He was born on 15 October 1845, educated at Trinity College, Dublin and ordained in 1872. He was Vicar of Hamilton, Victoria then Archdeacon of Ballarat. In 1895 he was created Bishop Coadjutor of Ballarat. In 1901 he became fourth Bishop of Grafton and Armidale, then, in 1914, first Bishop of Armidale following the division of the diocese. Cooper died on 1 July 1916.
