= John Moyes (bishop) =

Australian Anglican bishop and author

John Stoward Moyes CMG (25 July 1884 – 29 January 1972) was an Australian Anglican bishop and author.

== History ==
Moyes was born in Koolunga, a son of John Moyes (died 1927), headmaster of Port Pirie and Thebarton high schools, and his wife Ellen Jane Moyes, née Stoward (died 1898). He was educated at St Peter's College, Adelaide and the University of Adelaide. Ordained in 1908 he began his career with curacies at St Paul's, Port Pirie and St Mary's, Lewisham. Next he held incumbencies at St Cuthbert's Prospect and St Bartholomew's Norwood during which time he became Archdeacon of Adelaide. In 1929 he was appointed Bishop of Armidale, a post he held for 35 years.

== Social issues ==
Moyes was a proponent of the social gospel, having been influenced by his observation of extremes of wealth and poverty during his tenure at Lewisham.

Moyes was a prominent opponent of the 1950 Act of Parliament and the 1951 referendum to ban the Communist Party of Australia. Advocating for the "no" case, Moyes said:

For the Australian government to develop an order that is even a faint resemblance to the police state of totalitarian countries, with its hunting for victims, is to give communism its first victory, for we shall be adopting its methods, and using Satan to cast out Satan.

Moyes was also a prominent opponent of the Vietnam War.

== Family ==
Moyes married Helen Margaret Butler (1882–1970) in 1909. She was a daughter of Richard Butler, Premier of South Australia.

- Helena Margaret Moyes (1910–2001)
- Guy Stoward Moyes (1915–2004)
- Peter Morton Moyes (1917–2007)
- Philip Richard Moyes (1918– )
- Monica Mary Moyes (1924– )

His wife died in 1970 and the following year he remarried to Mary Scott Pentreath (née Holland). His brother, Morton Henry Moyes, was a member of Douglas Mawson's Antarctic expedition and the rescue of Shackleton; another brother, Johnny Moyes, was an international cricketer and journalist.

Anglican Communion titles
Preceded by Wentworth Francis Wentworth-Sheilds	Bishop of Armidale; 1929– 1964	Succeeded by Ronald Clive Kerle
