= Francis Wentworth-Sheilds =

British civil engineer (1869–1959)

- Born: Francis Ernest Sheilds; 16 November 1869; London, United Kingdom
- Died: 10 May 1959 (aged 89); Southampton, Hampshire, England
- Engineering career
- Discipline: Civil
- Institutions: Institution of Civil Engineers (president)

Francis Ernest Wentworth-Sheilds OBE (also spelt Shields; 16 November 1869 – 10 May 1959) was a British civil engineer.

Francis Ernest Sheilds was born in London in 1869, the younger son of engineer Francis Webb Sheilds. Rev. Wentworth Wentworth-Sheilds was his elder brother. The family added the surname Wentworth in 1877. He was educated at St Paul's School in London and Owens College, Manchester.

He was appointed to be a Major of the Territorial Army's Engineer and Railway Staff Corps, an unpaid, volunteer unit which provides technical expertise to the British Army, on 28 March 1925. He served as president of the Institution of Civil Engineers for the November 1944 to November 1945 session. Wentworth-Shields was an Officer of the Order of the British Empire. He died in 1959 in Southampton.

== Bibliography ==
- Watson, Garth (1988), The Civils, Thomas Telford Ltd, ISBN 0-7277-0392-7

Professional and academic associations
Preceded by David Anderson	President of the Institution of Civil Engineers; November 1944 – November 1945	Succeeded by Peirson Frank
