= Bishop's House, Perth =

Bishop's House
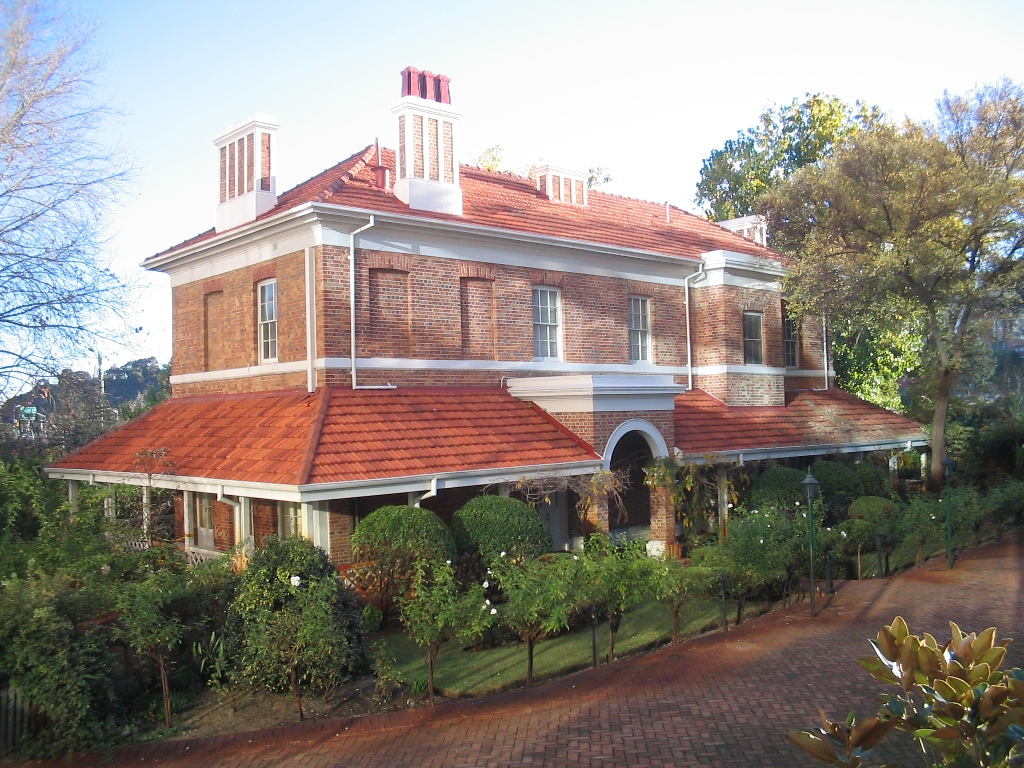
- Bishop's House, Perth

- Location within Perth

General information
- Type: Heritage-listed building
- Location: Perth, Western Australia
- Coordinates: 31.954192°S 115.851390°E

Western Australia Heritage Register
- Type: State Registered Place
- Designated: 5 January 2001
- Reference no.: 2093

Bishop's House is a heritage-listed former residence of the Anglican Bishop of Western Australia at 78 Mounts Bay Road, Perth, Western Australia.

== History ==
Bishop’s House is situated between St Georges Terrace and Mounts Bay Road, on the eastern side of Spring Street.

Bishop's House is a two-storey residence constructed in a Victorian Georgian style of architecture, in 1859, for Mathew Blagden Hale, the first Anglican Bishop of Western Australia. Bishop's House is situated on land known as the Bishop's See, located between St Georges Terrace, and Mount and Spring Streets at the western end of the Perth central business district.

In 1856, Bishop Hale, an independently wealthy clergyman, purchased five allotments on St Georges Terrace to build a residence for himself and his family. Hale favoured this location because of the large grounds and natural spring that flowed all year round, and that there was a house and stables. The land was purchased from Edward Hamersley and Alfred Hillman Senior (Assistant Surveyor General). In 1858, Hale arranged for the construction of his residence by ticket-of-leave men. In December that year, Hale and his family travelled to England, not returning until April 1860. Bishop's House was completed, at Hale's personal expense, for a cost £2,486, equivalent to A$298,579 in 2022, whilst the family was away overseas. The existing house on the site was utilised as a kitchen, and the stables as laundry and kitchen outhouses.

Hale planted ornamental trees in the front garden, and laid out the fruit garden at the rear. He also had the garden wall constructed at the rear of the property.

In 1860, Hale had a small cottage built adjacent to Bishop's House at a cost of £360. This was used as lodgings for visiting clergymen from the country and was known as Clergy House or Bishop's Cottage.

In 1872, Hale built another house on the Bishop's See site, near the corner of Spring and Mount Streets, to house and educate Aboriginal children. This two-storey building was known as Hale House. In 1875 Hale handed all his Perth properties over to the Perth Diocesan Trust and left Western Australia to take up his appointment as Bishop of Brisbane.

Bishop's House was then occupied by his successor, Henry Hutton Parry in 1876. Parry however found the upkeep of the residence beyond his means and moved his family into Bishop's Cottage, with Judge Hensman leasing Bishop's House. Hutton died whilst still in office in November 1893.

The next bishop to occupy Bishop's House was Charles Owen Leaver Riley who arrived to take up his post in 1895. Bishop's House was renovated and repaired for his occupancy. In 1904, Riley enlarged Bishop's House with funds from a public appeal within the Church. Following his death in 1929, Bishop's House was occupied by his successor, Henry Frewen Le Fanu. In 1930, renovations were carried out to Bishop's House for Le Fanu's occupancy.

Following Le Fanu's death in September 1946, succeeding archbishops choose not to occupy Bishop's House as their residence. In 1959, it was leased by Legacy Australia as their Perth headquarters, and became known as Legacy House.

In 1974, Bishop's House was used to accommodate the Anglican Health and Welfare Services (Anglicare) until the service was relocated to the Sambell Centre in Colin Street, West Perth.

In 1982, the Perth Diocesan Trust leased the site to St George's Investments, later known as Australian City Properties (ACP), owned by English entrepreneur Lord Alistair McAlpine (1942–2014), who used the residence as home and as an office. As part of the lease conditions, Bishop's House and its gardens were renovated and restored by architects Oldham Boas Ednie-Brown in 1984. Writing on the venture in his 1999 memoir, McAlpine wrote:

just across the road from the Bishop's See development, the jewel in my family company's crown. The Bishop's See development was on about four acres [1.6 ha] of near-derelict land on which sat several old buildings. I had these buildings, which included the particularly fine Bishop's House, restored, and a large area of land became an important West [sic] Australian garden. A multistorey office building occupied the balance of the site.

== Current uses ==
In 1999, the Multiplex Property Trust and the Hawaiian Property Group bought the heritage-listed residence as part of the overall Bishop's See site. The companies subsequently built two (a nine-storey and a larger twenty-seven-storey) modern office towers next to Bishop's House.

In November 2010, the building was converted into a multi-level restaurant, Lamont's Bishop's House, run by Kate Lamont.

== Heritage value ==
Bishop's House was classified by the National Trust (WA) on 11 May 1998 and listed on the City of Perth's Municipal Inventory, which was adopted 13 March 2001. It was permanently entered on to the State Register of Heritage Places on 5 January 2001 by the Heritage Council of Western Australia.
