= Bishop of the Eastern Region =

Bishop of (the) East(ern) (Region) may refer to:

- Bishop of the Eastern Region, an assistant bishop in the Anglican Diocese of Melbourne
- Bishop of the Eastern and Rural Region, an assistant bishop in the Anglican Diocese of Perth
