= Archbishop of Perth =

Archbishop of Perth may refer to:

- Anglican Archbishop of Perth
- Catholic Archbishop of Perth
