= Le Fanu House =

Heritage listed building in Cottesloe, Western Australia

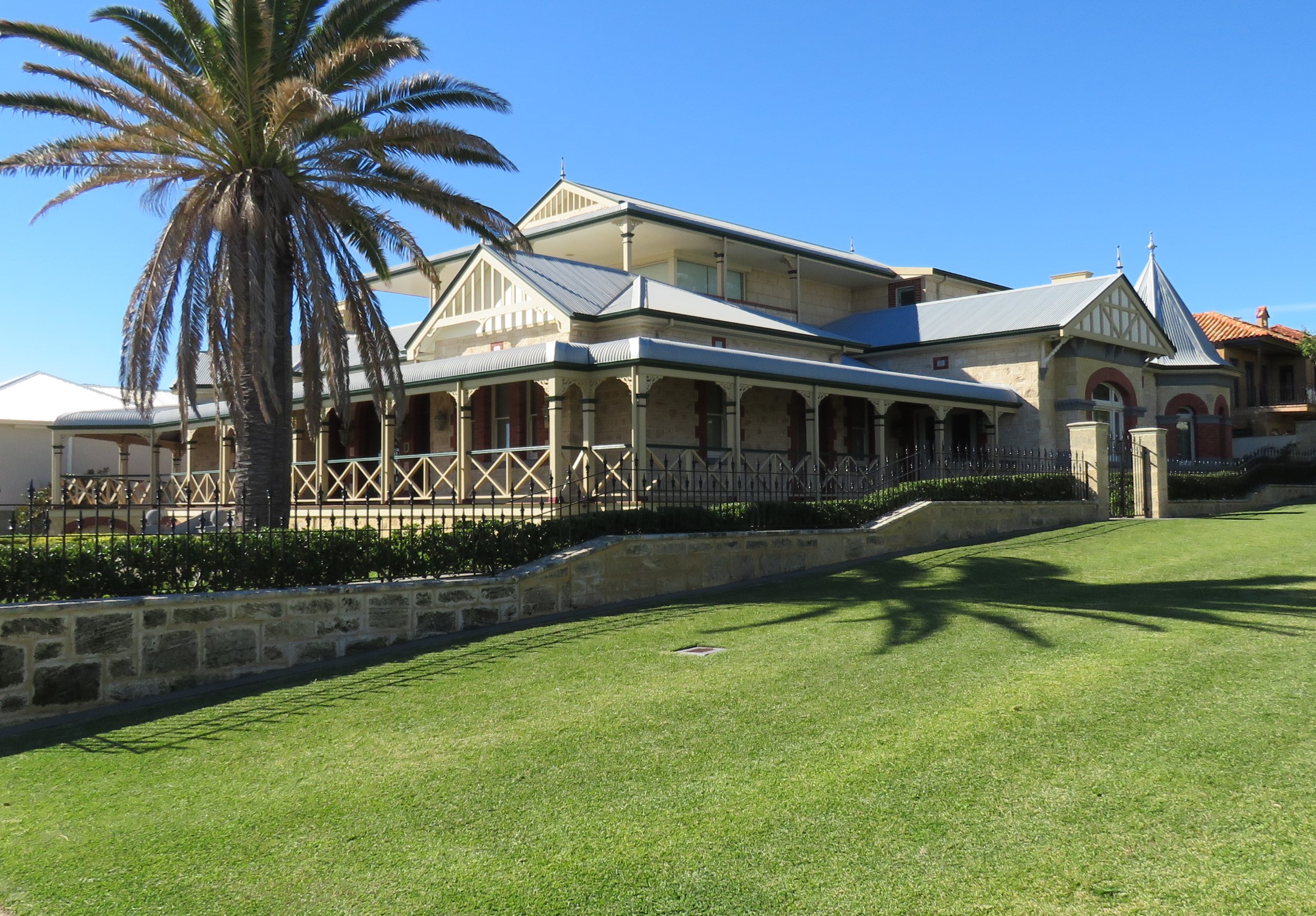
- Le Fanu House in May 2021
- Interactive map of the Le Fanu House area
- Former names: Banksia

General information
- Architectural style: Federation Queen Anne
- Location: 2 Salvado Street, Cottesloe, Western Australia, Australia
- Coordinates: 32.0050°S 115.7524°E
- Completed: 1893
- Renovated: 2011
- Owner: Henry Diggins Holmes

Western Australia Heritage Register
- Type: State Registered Place
- Designated: 7 January 2000
- Reference no.: 3306

Le Fanu House is a large Federation Queen Anne style single-storey home located in Salvado Street, Cottesloe, Western Australia. It was built around 1893, and is regarded as an example of a grand beachside home.

== History ==
Banksia (later Le Fanu) was built as a private residence for Henry Diggins Holmes, his wife Marion and their three children, at the corner of Salvado Road and Marine Parade, close to the dunes of Cottesloe Beach. Holmes was appointed General Manager of the Bank of Western Australia in 1890.

In 1898 and 1900, substantial additions and alterations designed by architect Percy William Harrison were undertaken and it was sold in 1945 to the Perth Diocesan Trustees and renamed after then Archbishop of Perth, Henry Frewen Le Fanu. It became a private residence again in 1973, when the property was purchased by Mrs Fenwick (now Mrs Drake-Brockman).

A story in Post Newspapers in January 2008 described the house as "crumbling into ruins". The 17-room house "is probably the most expensive chunk of real estate in Cottesloe – but it has serious complications", the story said. "It has the highest possible heritage listing – and presents an expensive challenge for any new owner because it cannot be demolished." The house had an asbestos roof, rotten roof timbers, crumbling bricks and collapsing limestone walls.

In August 2008, the house was listed for sale by the owners, Francis Margaret Drake-Brockman, for a reputed asking price of A$10 million, equivalent to A$13.9 million in 2022. In 2009, Steve Wyatt, co-founder of Mineral Resources, purchased Le Fanu for A$4.25 million, equivalent to A$5.8 million in 2022.

In September 2010, the Town of Cottesloe granted approval for owners S. Wyatt and S. Gibson to undertake extensive alterations and additions to the 17-room house, at an estimated cost of A$6 million, equivalent to A$7.9 million in 2022, to enable it to be restored for residential use. The proposed renovations include the demolition of four rooms, a northern verandah enclosed after World War II and a post World War II ablution block, the construction of an underground car park beneath the demolition area, and the restoration of the ballroom, dining room and study, with the kitchen being partially demolished and adapted as a guest suite. A large self-contained house will be built behind the existing dwelling. The works are being undertaken by Zorzi Builders, under the supervision of heritage architects, Hocking Planning and Architecture.

In 2022, mining magnate Andrew Forrest purchased the house from Wyatt.

== Architecture ==
According to Aussie Heritage, the house was originally known as Banksia, was built as the private residence of Henry Diggins Holmes and his wife Marion, and described as:

a large residence of dressed limestone, now roofed in asbestos. Gables on all four sides have Tudor details. On south-east is a bay window with conical turret topped with elegant finial. Surrounding verandahs supported on simple square timber posts. Garden enclosed by limestone wall. There is a lower floor on north side.

The house is categorised as being in Federation Style, with a Queen Anne turret, in an otherwise Romanesque form.

== Heritage value ==
Le Fanu House was classified by the National Trust of Australia (WA) on 12 May 1975 and permanently listed on the Register of the National Estate on 28 September 1982. The building(s) were also included on the Town of Cottesloe's Municipal Inventory on 30 September 1995 and were permanently listed on the State Register of Heritage Places on 7 January 2000 by the Heritage Council of Western Australia.

== See also ==
- Henry Le Fanu
