= St Andrew's Rectory, Toogoolawah =

1925 house in Queensland, Australia

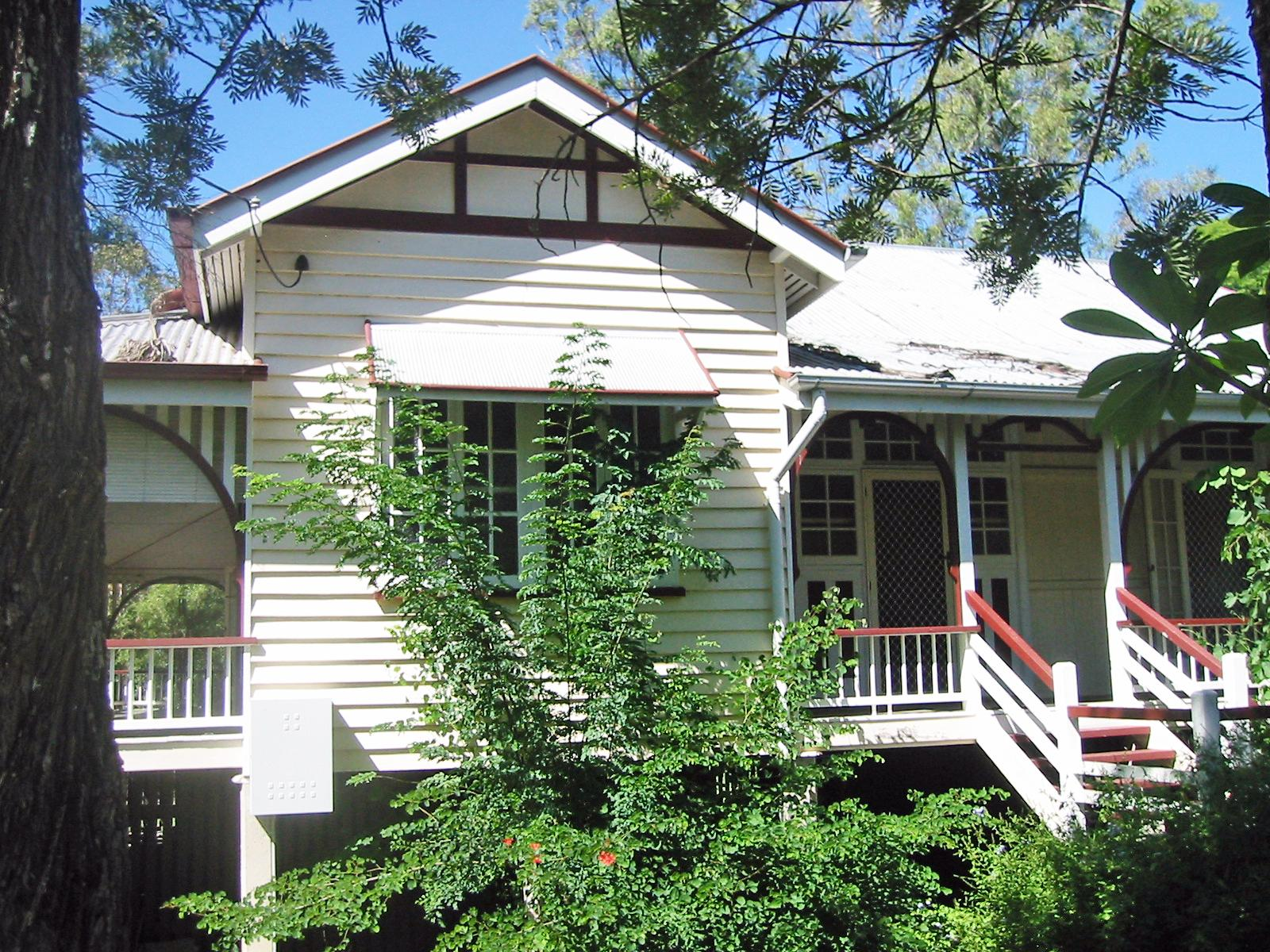
- St. Andrew's Anglican Rectory, 2012

- Location within Queensland Location within Australia
- 27.0904°S 152.376°E
- Location: Mangerton Street, Toogoolawah, Somerset Region, Queensland, Australia

History
- Design period: 1919–1930s (interwar period)
- Built: 1925

Queensland Heritage Register
- Official name: St Andrew's Rectory
- Type: state heritage (built, landscape)
- Designated: 21 October 1992
- Reference no.: 600501
- Significant period: 1920s (fabric, historical)
- Significant components: residential accommodation – rectory, garden/grounds

St Andrew's Rectory is a heritage-listed detached house at Mangerton Street, Toogoolawah, Somerset Region, Queensland, Australia. It was built in 1925 by a local builder AD Menzies. It was added to the Queensland Heritage Register on 21 October 1992.

== History ==
This single-storeyed weatherboard house was constructed in 1925 as the rectory for St Andrew's Anglican Church in Toogoolawah.

The Parish of Toogoolawah had been created in 1917, following division of the Esk parish into two, and reflected the population expansion which accompanied the success of Nestle's Toogoolawah condensed milk factory during the First World War.

In 1920, Mary McConnel of Cressbrook Station, who in 1911 had donated the land on which St Andrews Church was subsequently erected, gave the parish a further two allotments in Mangerton Street, between the Church and the St Andrew's Church Hall, on which to build a rectory.

In 1924, the parish asked for plans and specifications for a rectory to be prepared by the local builders, probably contractor AD Menzies, who erected many of the buildings in Toogoolawah until the mid-1920s. Work began in January 1925, and the house was completed in late May that year, at a cost of £1,008.

The Anglican parishes of Esk and Toogoolawah were amalgamated as the Brisbane Valley parish in 1928, and the rector has resided since at Toogoolawah rather than at Esk.

== Description ==
This single-storeyed timber building is set amongst mature trees, including some large palms, and the grounds form the southern part of the St Andrew's Church precinct and the northwestern boundary to McConnel Park.

The building has verandahs on the north and west elevations and sits on concrete stumps with a semi-enclosed space beneath. The exterior is clad in weatherboard with timber battens between the exterior stumps.

The wide verandahs have decorative timber valance and balustrades, with a deep and low railing which forms a seat. Entry is from the west via a quarter-turn stair with landing. The front door has decorative glass sidelights, fanlight and upper panel and opens into a foyer. A narrow study opens off the west verandah and has a gabled street elevation. This gable is repeated on the eastern elevation over the kitchen.

Internally, walls are single skin VJ boards, and French doors with fanlights open onto the verandahs. Ceilings are boarded and a decorative lancet shaped, timber arch valance is located between the foyer and lounge. Window hoods are corrugated iron with timber brackets.

A driveway from the north runs behind the church and church hall to the rectory.

== Heritage listing ==
St Andrew's Rectory was listed on the Queensland Heritage Register on 21 October 1992 having satisfied the following criteria:

The place is important in demonstrating the evolution or pattern of Queensland's history.

St Andrew's Rectory, erected in 1925, is significant historically in illustrating the consolidation of the Anglican Church in Toogoolawah.

The place is important in demonstrating the principal characteristics of a particular class of cultural places.

It is important in demonstrating the principal characteristics of an intact 1920s weatherboard Queensland house, and is a good example of its type.

The place is important because of its aesthetic significance.

It exhibits aesthetic characteristics valued by the community, including the aesthetic contribution of building and grounds to the Toogoolawah townscape, and the aesthetic quality of the timber verandahs.

The place has a strong or special association with a particular community or cultural group for social, cultural or spiritual reasons.

St Andrew's Rectory has a strong association with the Toogoolawah community, being an integral part of an historic, visually cohesive and picturesque precinct comprising St Andrew's church, church hall, and rectory and adjacent McConnel Park (featuring the Toogoolawah War Memorial).

The place has a special association with the life or work of a particular person, group or organisation of importance in Queensland's history.

St Andrew's Rectory has a special association with the McConnel family and their contribution to the development of social and community life in Toogoolawah.

== See also ==
- St Andrew's Church, Toogoolawah
- St Andrew's Church Hall, Toogoolawah
