= Bishop of Perth =

The Bishop of Perth may refer to:

- Anglican Bishop of Perth, precursor title of the Anglican Archbishop of Perth
- Catholic Bishop of Perth, precursor title of the Roman Catholic Archbishop of Perth
