= St Andrew's Church Hall, Toogoolawah =

St Andrew's Church Hall
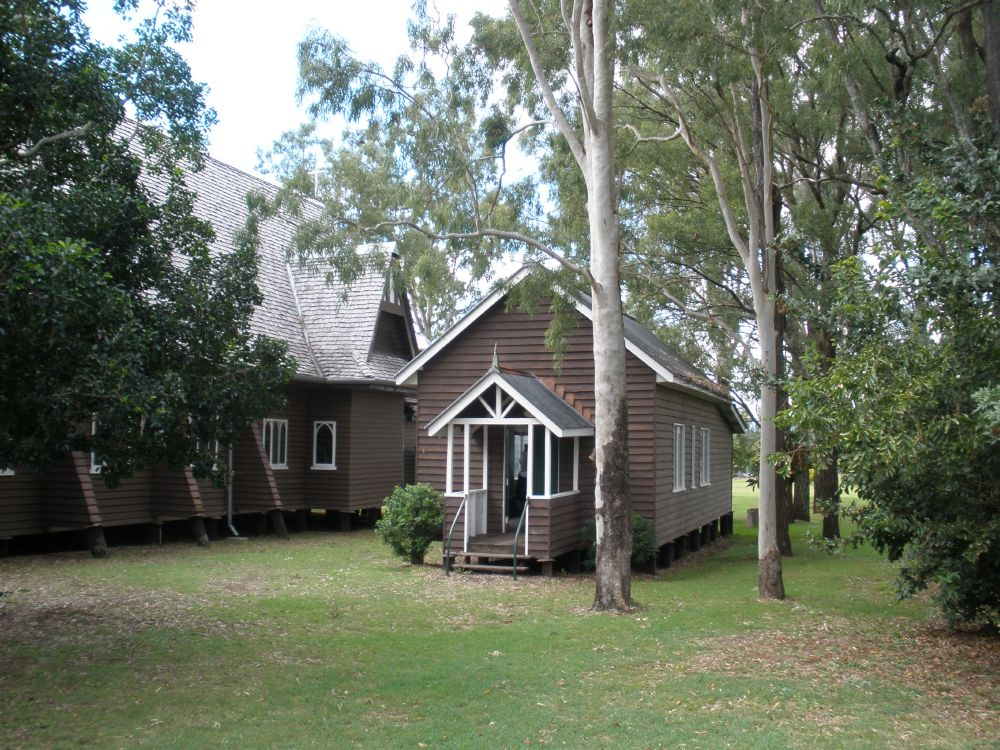
- St Andrew's Church Hall, 2009

- Location within Queensland Location within Australia
- 27.0901°S 152.376°E
- Location: Mangerton Street, Toogoolawah, Somerset Region, Queensland, Australia

History
- Design period: 1900–1914 (early 20th century)
- Built: 1906

Queensland Heritage Register
- Official name: St Andrew's Church Hall
- Type: state heritage (built)
- Designated: 21 October 1992
- Reference no.: 600500
- Significant period: 1906 (fabric); 1906–1912, 1920 (historical)
- Significant components: trees/plantings
- Builders: A D Menzies

St Andrew's Church Hall is a heritage-listed church hall at Mangerton Street, Toogoolawah, Somerset Region, Queensland, Australia. It was built in 1906 by A D Menzies. It was added to the Queensland Heritage Register on 21 October 1992.

== History ==
This small weatherboard hall was erected in 1906 for the Anglican congregation in Toogoolawah, on land in Mangerton Street owned by Mary Elizabeth McConnel of Cressbrook. This site is now the vacant block to the south of the rectory, the hall having been moved to its present location beside the church.

The town of Cressbrook Creek (later Toogoolawah) was founded when Mary McConnel's husband, JH McConnel, subdivided a large section of the Cressbrook estate in the late 1890s, and established a condensed milk factory on Cressbrook Creek in 1898. The town expanded when the Brisbane Valley railway line was completed in 1904 providing a connection to Ipswich.

It is believed Mary McConnel paid for the construction of the hall. Probably the builder was AD Menzies, who erected most of the buildings in Toogoolawah until the mid-1920s.

The hall was opened by the Archbishop in September 1906, and Anglican services were held there until St Andrew's Church was erected in 1911–1912. Subsequently, the building became the Sunday School hall, and in 1920 the church purchased from Mrs McConnel both the hall and the site, for the sum of £100.

The building has been moved since to its present location beside the church, and has undergone a number of alterations.

== Description ==
This single-storeyed timber building is set amongst mature trees on a corner site forming the northwestern boundary to McConnel Park. St Andrew's Church is located on the northern side of the building and St Andrew's rectory and its grounds are to the south.

The building has a corrugated iron gabled roof with a skillion roof to the rear kitchenette and a gabled roof to the front porch. The exterior is dark painted weatherboard, matching St Andrew's Church, and sits on timber stumps.

The front porch has a solid weatherboard balustrade and a decorative timber front gable with a metal finial. The windows now have glass louvres and the timber trim is painted white.

Internal walls and ceiling are lined with fibrous cement sheeting.

== Heritage listing ==
St Andrew's Church Hall was listed on the Queensland Heritage Register on 21 October 1992 having satisfied the following criteria.

The place is important in demonstrating the evolution or pattern of Queensland's history.

St Andrew's Church Hall, erected in 1906, is significant historically in illustrating the establishment of the Anglican Church in Toogoolawah.

The place is important because of its aesthetic significance.

It exhibits aesthetic characteristics valued by the community, in particular the aesthetic contribution of building and grounds to the Toogoolawah townscape.

The place has a strong or special association with a particular community or cultural group for social, cultural or spiritual reasons.

The place has a strong association with the Toogoolawah community, being an integral part of an historic, visually cohesive and picturesque precinct comprising St Andrew's church, church hall, and rectory and adjacent McConnel Park (containing the Toogoolawah War Memorial).

The place has a special association with the life or work of a particular person, group or organisation of importance in Queensland's history.

St Andrew's Church Hall has a special association with the McConnel family and their contribution to the development of social and religious life in Toogoolawah.

== See also ==
- St Andrew's Church, Toogoolawah
- St Andrew's Rectory, Toogoolawah
