= Robert Moline =

Australian bishop (1889–1979)

The Most Reverend Robert Moline MC
- Archbishop of Perth
- Church: Church of England
- Province: Western Australia
- Diocese: Perth
- In office: 1947–1962
- Predecessor: Henry Le Fanu
- Successor: George Appleton
- Other post: Metropolitan of Western Australia (ex officio)
- Previous posts: Vicar of St Paul's Knightsbridge; (1940–1947); Rector of North Cadbury then of Poplar; Archdeacon of North Queensland; (1927–1929); Warden of the Bush Brotherhood, North Queensland; (1925–1927)

Orders
- Ordination: 30 May 1920 (as deacon); 22 May 1921 (as priest)
- Consecration: 25 April 1947 by Geoffrey Fisher

Personal details
- Born: Robert William Haines Moline; 20 October 1889 Sudbury, Suffolk, England
- Died: 8 August 1979 (aged 89) Coulsdon, Greater London, England
- Denomination: Anglican
- Spouse: Mirabel Mathilde, née Parker (m. 1929)
- Education: The King's School, Canterbury
- Alma mater: Emmanuel College, Cambridge

Robert William Haines Moline MC (20 October 1889 – 8 August 1979) was an Anglican bishop.

Moline was born at Sudbury, Suffolk (where his father was Rector) and educated at The King's School, Canterbury and Emmanuel College, Cambridge. Decorated for World War I service with the Rifle Brigade, he was made deacon on Trinity Sunday 1920 (30 May) and ordained priest the following Trinity Sunday (22 May 1921), both times by Arthur Winnington-Ingram, Bishop of London, at St Paul's Cathedral. He began his ministry with a curacy at St Matthew's, Bethnal Green after which he joined the Brotherhood of St Barnabas in North Queensland. He was its Warden from 1925 to 1927 and was the Archdeacon of the area until 1929. Returning to England he was Rector of North Cadbury then of Poplar. From 1940 until 1947 he was Vicar of St Paul's Knightsbridge when he became Archbishop of Perth, a position he held until his retirement in 1962. He was consecrated a bishop on 25 April 1947, by Geoffrey Fisher, Archbishop of Canterbury, at Westminster Abbey; he died at Coulsdon, Greater London.

Anglican Communion titles
Preceded by Henry Le Fanu	Archbishops of Perth; 1947–1962	Succeeded by George Appleton
