= Kate Lamont =

Australian cook, political aspirant and author (born 1962)

Kate Lamont AM
- Born: 13 October 1962 (age 63); Perth, Western Australia
- Occupations: Cook, political aspirant, author, businesswoman.
- Writing career
- Genre: Cooking

Kate Lamont AM (born 13 October 1962) is an Australian cook, political aspirant and author.

== Career ==
Lamont has hospitality interest in the Swan Valley, Margaret River and a bottle shop and bar in Cottesloe, Western Australia. as well as Lamont's Bishops House in Perth, Western Australia.

== Empire Beer Group Limited ==
In October 2006, Lamont was an inaugural Director of the Empire Beer Group Limited, which ran pubs, brewed beers. Lamont featured in its public prospectus which aimed to raise $10,000,000 AU by way of the issue of shares at an issue price of $0.35 each.

By December 2007 the stock was trading at $0.16, by July 2008 the stock was trading at $0.05 and by 9 February it was trading at $0.03, a $9 million reduction on the original $10 million raised capital.

On 18 March 2009, Kate Lamont resigned as a non-executive director of Empire.

== Political Appointments, Connections and Candidacy ==
=== Labor Party Appointments ===
Lamont was appointed as a board member of Tourism WA Board of Commissioners in 2004, by the Gallop Labor Government and Chairman of Tourism WA by then Labor Tourism Minister Mark McGowan and the WA Labor Government from 1 September 2006 for a 5-year term.

Lamont was appointed as a board member of Tourism Australia by the Rudd Labor Government and in July 2010 was appointed Deputy Chair of Tourism Australia by Federal Labor Minister Martin Ferguson

=== Liberal Party Candidate ===
In April 2012 WA Premier Colin Barnett confirmed that he had discussed pre-selection for the Liberal Party for the State Seat of Churchlands with Lamont and his media advisor Dixie Marshall and subsequently sought an extension of the nomination period to allow the nomination to occur. A story in the West Australian on 3 May 2012 suggested the nomination was causing a revolt in Liberal ranks with Party sources questioning how close Lamont was to Labor State and Federal Figures.

== Books and media ==
- Family, Food and Friends (2000) ISBN 1-86368-293-7
- A Year in the Kitchen with Kate Lamont (2004) ISBN 978-1-920731-34-2
- Celebrating (2007) ISBN 978-1-921361-00-5
- Wine and Food (2009) ISBN 978-1-921401-33-6
