= Inverness, Toogoolawah =

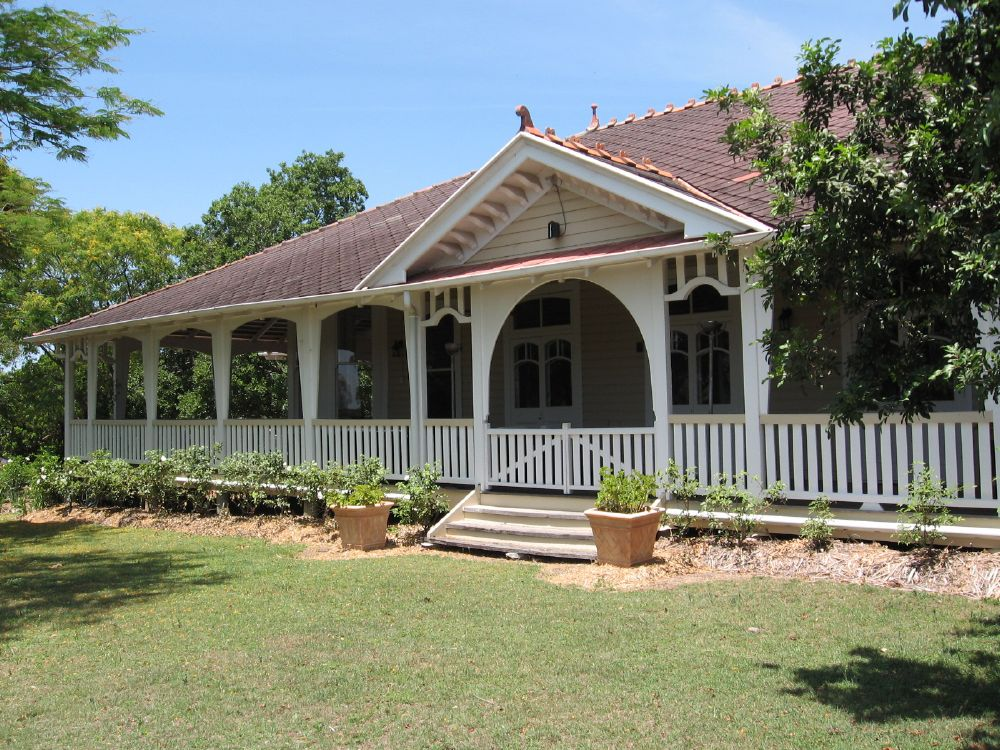
- Inverness, 2007

- Location within Queensland Location within Australia
- 27.0887°S 152.3718°E
- Location: 58 Fulham Street, Toogoolawah, Somerset Region, Queensland, Australia

History
- Design period: 1914–1919 (World War I)
- Built: 1917

Site notes
- Architect: John Henry Burley
- Architectural style: Arts & Crafts

Queensland Heritage Register
- Official name: Inverness
- Type: state heritage (built, landscape)
- Designated: 21 October 1992
- Reference no.: 600498
- Significant period: 1917–1931 (fabric, historical)
- Significant components: cellar, staircase/stairs – divided, garden/grounds, driveway, residential accommodation – manager's house/quarters, lead light/s
- Builders: D A Menzies

Inverness is a heritage-listed detached house at 58 Fulham Street, Toogoolawah, Somerset Region, Queensland, Australia. It was designed by John Henry Burley and built in 1917 by D A Menzies. It was added to the Queensland Heritage Register on 21 October 1992.

== History ==
Inverness was erected in 1917 for the Nestle & Anglo-Swiss Condensed Milk Company Limited, as the manager's residence associated with their Toogoolawah condensed milk factory.

The enterprise had been established in 1898 by the McConnel family on part of their Cressbrook estate, and was known as the Cressbrook Dairy Company's Condensed Milk Factory. An early manager's residence of timber and iron was erected adjacent to the factory about the same time.

The village of Cressbrook grew around the factory. With the arrival of the railway linking the town to Ipswich in 1904, the town expanded and was renamed Toogoolawah.

In 1907 the Nestle & Anglo-Swiss Condensed Milk Company bought out the Cressbrook Dairy Company, comprising the condensed milk factory and at least eight Cressbrook farms. At the time, Queensland was the only place in the world in which Nestle invested in company-owned farms. The factory was expanded and the number of employees doubled.

Production rose during the First World War, and in 1917 a more prestigious company residence, Inverness, was erected on part of Nestle's Bellambi Farm, on the hill adjacent to the township. The large home reflected the manager's status in a prosperous factory town.

It was designed by Brisbane architect John Henry Burley. His use of asbestos cement roofing tiles and interior wall sheeting was amongst the earliest application of these products in Queensland.

The builder was local contractor DA Menzies, who erected most of the buildings constructed in Toogoolawah until the mid-1920s.

The residence was occupied in 1917 by Archibald C Munro, manager of the factory from 1909 to 1931, and his family. The Munros named the house Inverness, after the district in Scotland from which AC Munro's father had emigrated. They employed a permanent gardener, cook and housemaid.

Nestle closed the bulk of the factory in 1929, retaining some secondary production until December 1930. The farms were sold, and the population of Toogoolawah halved. The Munros left the manager's residence in 1931.

During the Second World War, Nestle stored their Brisbane records in the old factory, and female staff were accommodated at Inverness. In 1948 the house was sold. It remains a private residence on just over 4.8 hectares (12 acres).

The factory was destroyed by fire in 1951, and the site was sold in 1956.

== Description ==
Inverness is a large, single-storeyed timber house, situated on the hill top above Toogoolawah. The building shows influences of stylistic trends popular around Federation in the treatment of decorative elements.

The hipped roof has projecting gables above the front entrance, side verandah entrance and billiards room. The roof features decorative eaves and gables with diamond patterned asbestos (Durabestos) shingles and decorative terra-cotta ridges and finials. The two chimneys are tapered and rendered.

The building sits on timber stumps. Verandahs are situated on the eastern, northern and western elevations with tapered timber brackets and valances and vertical timber paling balustrading. Corners are treated differently, with verandah posts being closer together and the timber valance consisting of open vertical railing.

The main entrance is approached from a circular drive to a double staircase and symmetrical entrance porch. The entrance features floral motif leadlight panels in the door and fanlight.

Internal walls are clad in asbestos cement with timber cover strips, the patterns of which vary from room to room. Service rooms are clad in VJ boards.

Internal doors feature fanlights above, and rooms open onto the verandahs via French doors. Rooms to the rear of the building have double-hung sash windows with window hoods of timber and Durabestos shingles.

The entrance hall features a fireplace with timber surrounds and a decorative screen to the rear. Fireplaces also feature in the dining room and bedrooms one and two. A wall between the entrance hall and drawing room has been removed, and the kitchen layout has been altered.

A laundry structure with a skillion roof is attached to the rear of the building with a brick cellar under the kitchen area.

== Heritage listing ==
Inverness was listed on the Queensland Heritage Register on 21 October 1992 having satisfied the following criteria.

The place is important in demonstrating the evolution or pattern of Queensland's history.

Inverness at Toogoolawah is important in demonstrating the pattern of Queensland's history, being evidence of the important connection between the multi-national Nestle & Anglo-Swiss Condensed Milk Company and the town of Toogoolawah, pre-1930.

The place is important in demonstrating the principal characteristics of a particular class of cultural places.

It is important in demonstrating the principal characteristics of a large, highly intact 1910s Queensland residence, with Arts and Crafts influences, and incorporating an early use of fibrous-cement products in a Queensland residence.

It is significant as an impressive example of the domestic work of Brisbane architect JH Burley, who demonstrated considerable skill in combining a variety of eclectic stylistic elements into an integrated whole.

The place is important because of its aesthetic significance.

The place exhibits aesthetic characteristics valued by the community, including its landmark quality in the townscape of Toogoolawah, and its size, detailing and siting, reflecting the factory manager's status and role in the community.

The place has a special association with the life or work of a particular person, group or organisation of importance in Queensland's history.

(Criterion under review)
