= Kate Wilmot =

Australian Anglican bishop

The Right Reverend Kate Wilmot
- Assistant Bishop of Perth
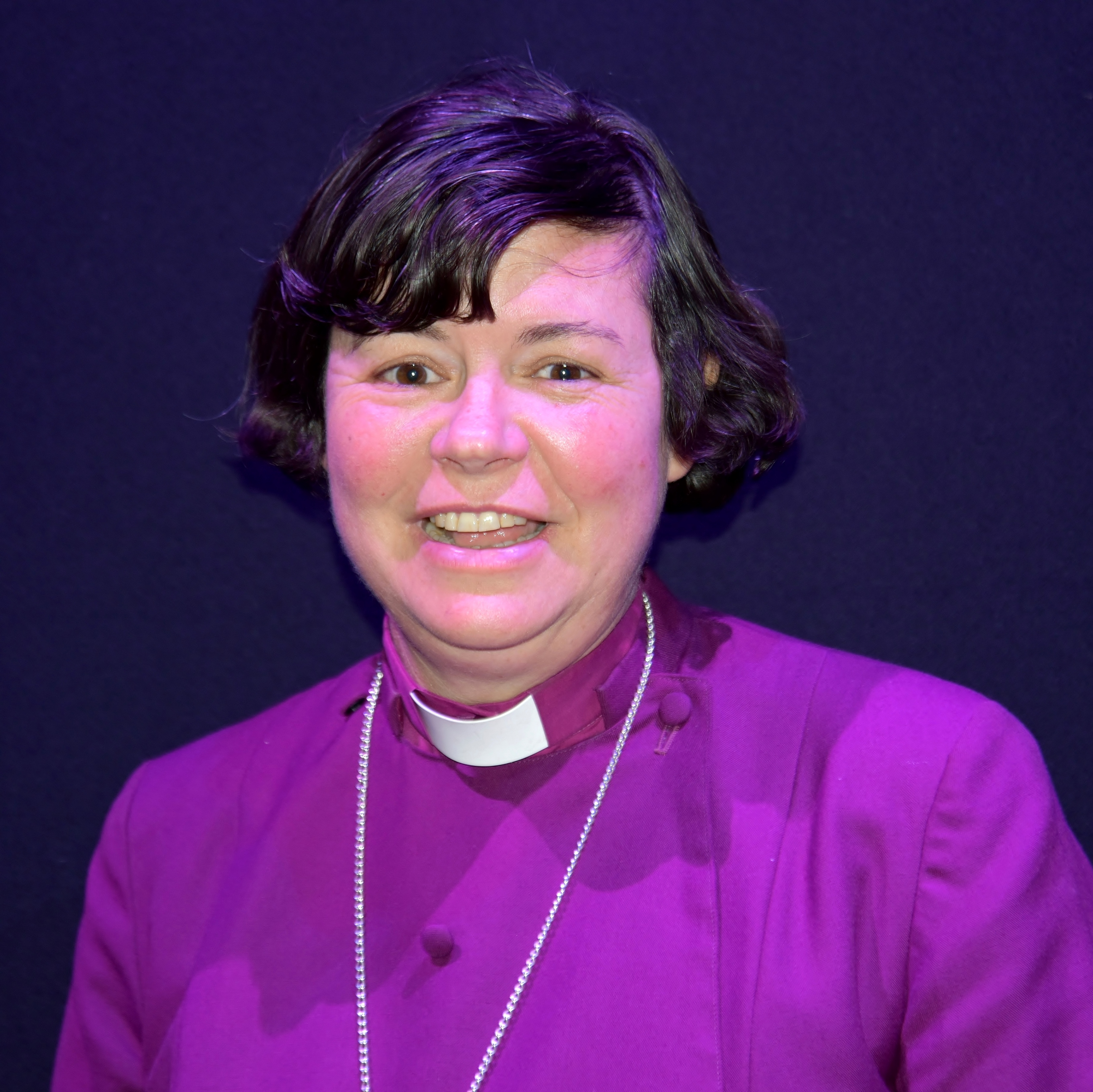
- Wilmot in 2019
- Church: Anglican Church of Australia
- Diocese: Diocese of Perth
- In office: August 2015 – present
- Predecessor: Kay Goldsworthy
- Other post: Priest

Orders
- Ordination: 2000
- Consecration: 2015 by Roger Herft

Personal details
- Born: Katherine Ann Wilmot
- Denomination: Anglican
- Education: Bachelor of Arts, University of Western Australia; Bachelor of Divinity, Murdoch University

Katherine Ann Wilmot (born 1968) is an Anglican bishop in Australia. She was consecrated in August 2015 to serve as an assistant bishop in the Anglican Diocese of Perth.

== Personal life and previous career ==
Wilmot was born in Darwin, Northern Territory, and obtained a Bachelor of Arts at the University of Western Australia in 1992. She worked as a computer typesetter before her ordination.

== Ministry ==
Wilmot obtained a Bachelor of Divinity degree at Murdoch University in 1999. She was ordained a deacon in 1999 and became an assistant curate at St John's church, Northam, from 1999 to 2001. She was ordained priest in February 2000 and subsequently became priest-in-charge of the parishes of Ballajura (2001-2009) and rector at St Augustine of Canterbury Church, Bayswater, Western Australia (2009-2015). During that time she was also an Army Reserve chaplain from 2004 to 2016, area dean of the Mirrabooka Deanery (2007-09) and a canon of St George’s Cathedral, Perth (2008-2015).

In 2015 she was consecrated bishop by the then Archbishop of Perth, Roger Herft. She is an assistant bishop in the Diocese of Perth and assistant bishop with episcopal oversight of the South: Yonga (formerly Armadale), Gwaya (formerly Cockburn), Wagyl (formerly Melville) and Marli (formerly Perth and Victoria Park) deaneries.

From 2016-2018 she was administrator of the Diocese of Perth while the diocese was without an archbishop when Herft stood down then retired. In 2018 she presided at the service for the installation of Kay Goldsworthy as Archbishop of Perth.
