= Michael Challen =

Anglican bishop

Michael Boyd Challen (born 27 May 1932) is a retired Australian Anglican bishop, active in the second half of the 20th century.

Challen was born in 1932 and attended Mentone Primary School and Mordialloc-Chelsea High. He graduated from the University of Melbourne in 1955; and entered Ridley College, Melbourne to train for the priesthood. He was ordained deacon in 1957 and priest in 1958. After a curacy in Essendon he was Director of the Melbourne Diocesan Centre from 1963 to 1969. Moving to Perth he became a missionary in the outback and in 1976 became Archdeacon of the country regions of Western Australia. The following year he became Assistant Bishop of Perth, serving until 1991. He was then Executive Director of the Brotherhood of St Laurence until 1999.

In retirement, Challen was criticized by a 2012 inquiry into the institutional sexual abuse of boys in the care of Anglican residential homes for his role in allowing an offender to resign rather than reporting the matter to police. Challen's failure to act at this time was later cited as a critical factor in enabling the offender to go on to a long period of sexual offending as a junior cricket coach.

On 2 September 2026, the Governor-General of the Commonwealth of Australia terminated the appointment as a Member of the Order of Australia made to Mr Michael Boyd Challen.
