= St Andrew's Church, Toogoolawah =

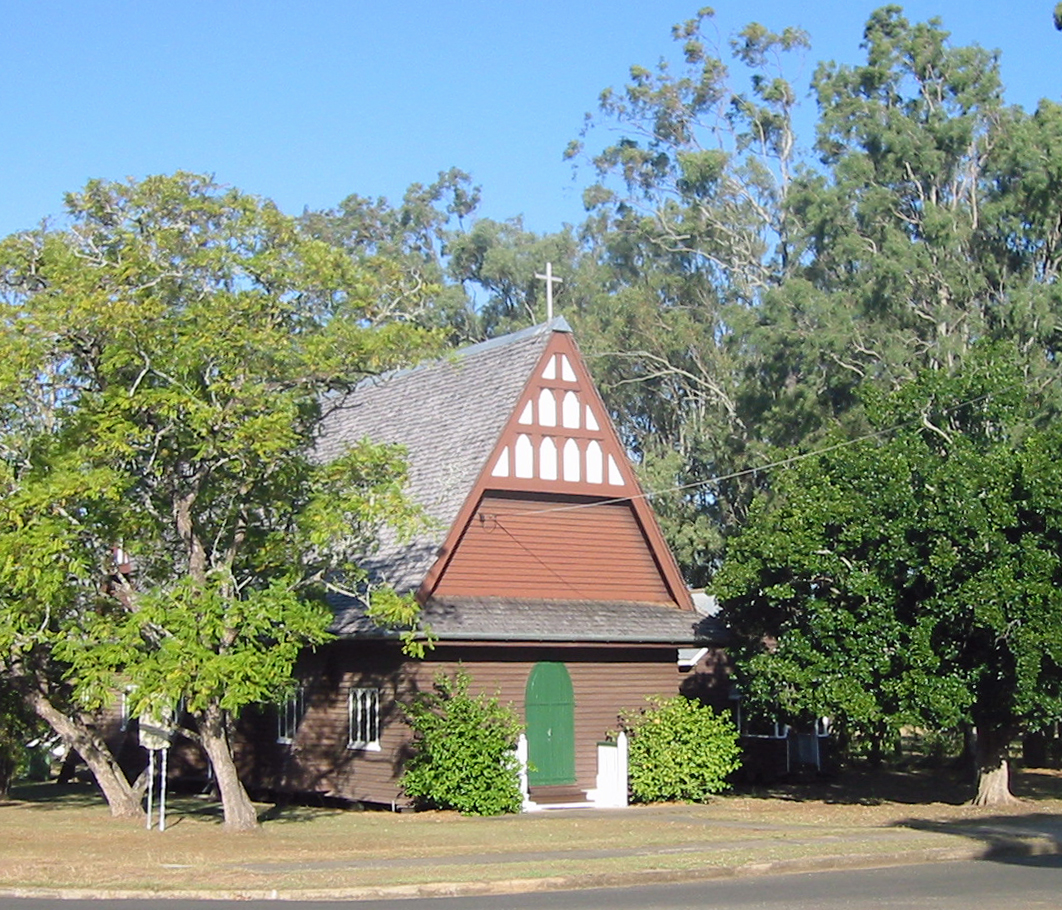
- St. Andrew's Anglican Church

- Location within Queensland
- 27.0899°S 152.376°E
- Location: 2 Mangerton Street, Toogoolawah, Somerset Region, Queensland, Australia

History
- Design period: 1900–1914 (early 20th century)
- Built: 1911–1930

Site notes
- Architect: Robin Dods

Queensland Heritage Register
- Official name: St Andrew's Church
- Type: state heritage (built)
- Designated: 21 October 1992
- Reference no.: 600502
- Significant period: 1911–1912, 1930 (fabric)
- Significant components: stained glass window/s, pipe organ, furniture/fittings
- Builders: Donald Alexander Menzies

St Andrew's Church is a heritage-listed Anglican church at 2 Mangerton Street, Toogoolawah, Somerset Region, Queensland, Australia. It was designed by Robin Dods and built from 1911 to 1912 by local builder Donald Alexander Menzies at a cost of £839. It was added to the Queensland Heritage Register on 21 October 1992.

When first constructed, it featured a shingle roof, a hand carved altar and a choir stall screen and was described at the time as "a welcome advance in the church architecture of this district". The Anglican Church Chronicle reported that "The treatment is original and effective and proves that the possibilities in connection with the architecture of wooden buildings are wider in extent than is commonly supposed".

== History ==
St Andrew's Church was constructed in 1911–1912 for the Anglican congregation in Toogoolawah, on land donated in 1911 by Mary Elizabeth McConnel of Cressbrook. The McConnel family were personal friends of Archbishop of Brisbane St Clair Donaldson.

The town of Cressbrook Creek (later Toogoolawah) was founded when her husband, JH McConnel, subdivided a large section of the Cressbrook estate in the late 1890s and established a condensed milk factory on Cressbrook Creek in 1898. The town expanded when the rail connection to Ipswich was completed in 1904, and again after the purchase of the factory by the Nestlé & Anglo-Swiss Condensed Milk Company Ltd in 1907.

Prior to the construction of the church, services at Cressbrook Creek had been conducted at the Union Church, and then in the Anglican hall built by the McConnels in 1906.

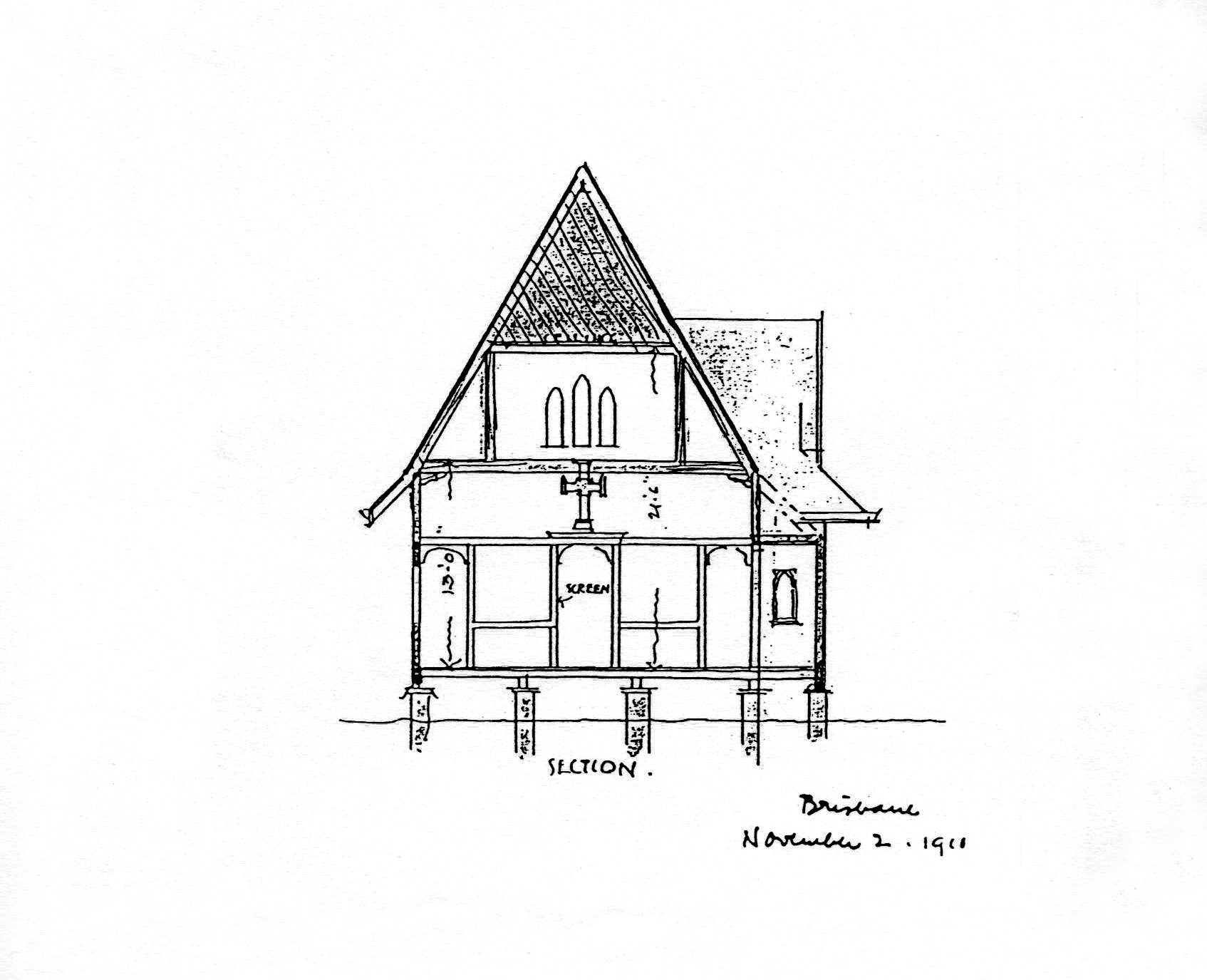
Robin Dods' architectural drawing of St Andrew's Anglican Church, Toogoolawah

Brisbane diocesan architect Robin Smith Dods prepared the designs for the church in 1908. He was well known to the McConnels, having designed in 1901 the Victoria Chapel at Cressbrook station.

St Andrews was erected in 1911–1912 by local contractor DA Menzies, who constructed most of the buildings in Toogoolawah until the mid-1920s. The contract price was £839. It was completed in January 1912. St Andrew's was dedicated by Archbishop Donaldson on 12 May 1912.

The original building had no buttresses. In February 1913 it was reported that, "St Andrew's Anglican Church was severely strained and put out of plumb by a very severe windstorm last week-end. The roof and superstructure only appear to have suffered." Garden fetes raised money, and tenders for repairs were called in April 1913. By August it was reported that these repairs included buttressing the church, and these buttresses have been a feature of this church since that time.

In 1925 the St Andrew's Rectory was built for £1008 by a local contractor, and it was formally opened and blessed by Bishop Henry Le Fanu on 10 July 1925.

The original split cedar shingles were replaced in 1966 with sawn shingles of local iron bark and crow's ash.

The original stables beside the church were removed in 1978 to relocate the Anglican Church Hall there.

The Church received the baptismal font from Archbishop Donaldson's private chapel at Bishopsbourne as a gift before its dedication, and now has many stained glass windows. St Andrew's Anglican Church, Toogoolawah, celebrated a hundred years of service on 12 May 2012, where Rob Nolan, Assistant Bishop of the Diocese of Brisbane and Bishop of the Western Region, conducted the centenary service.

== Description ==
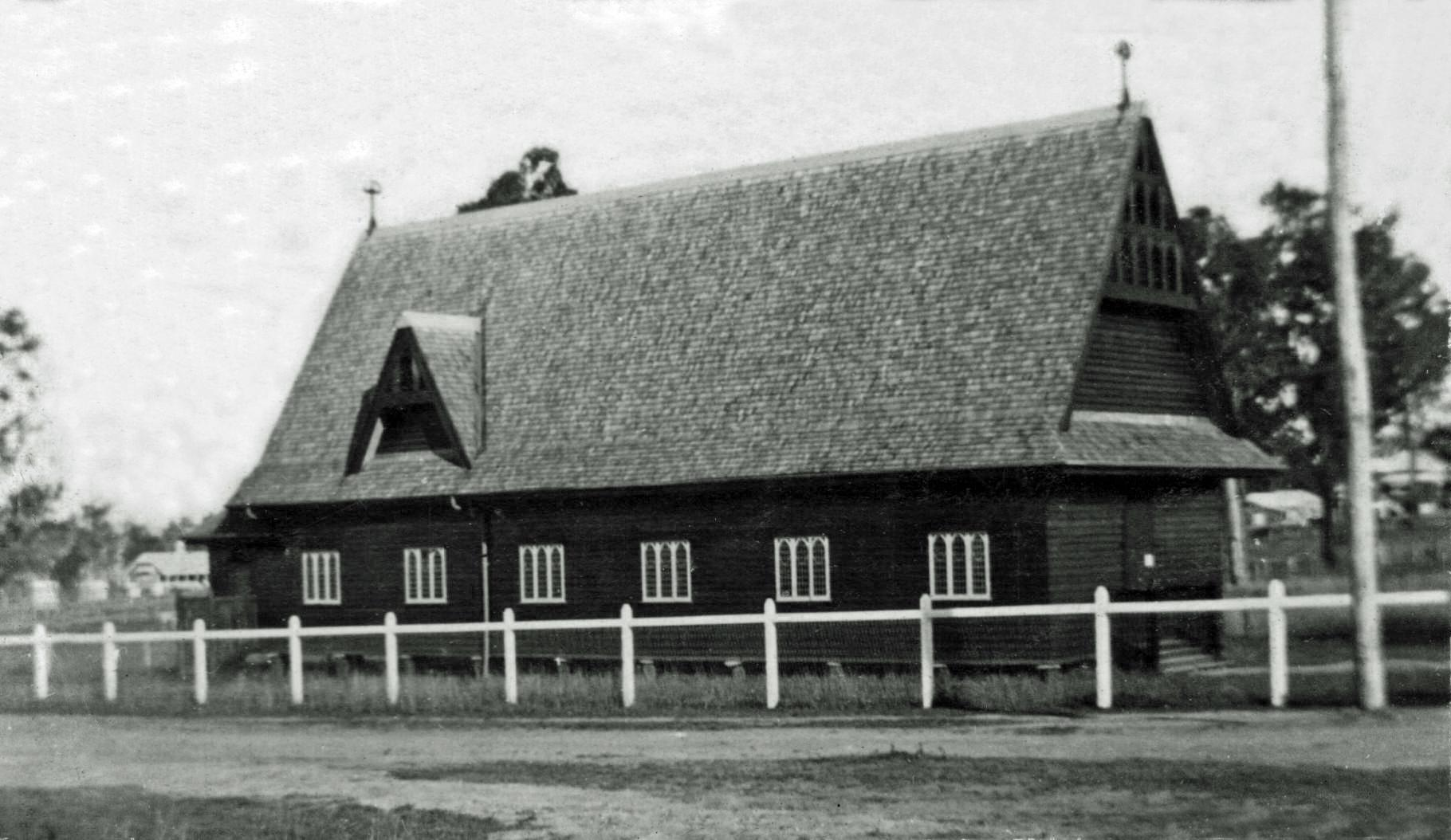
St Andrew's Anglican Church, Toogoolawah, without buttresses, 1912

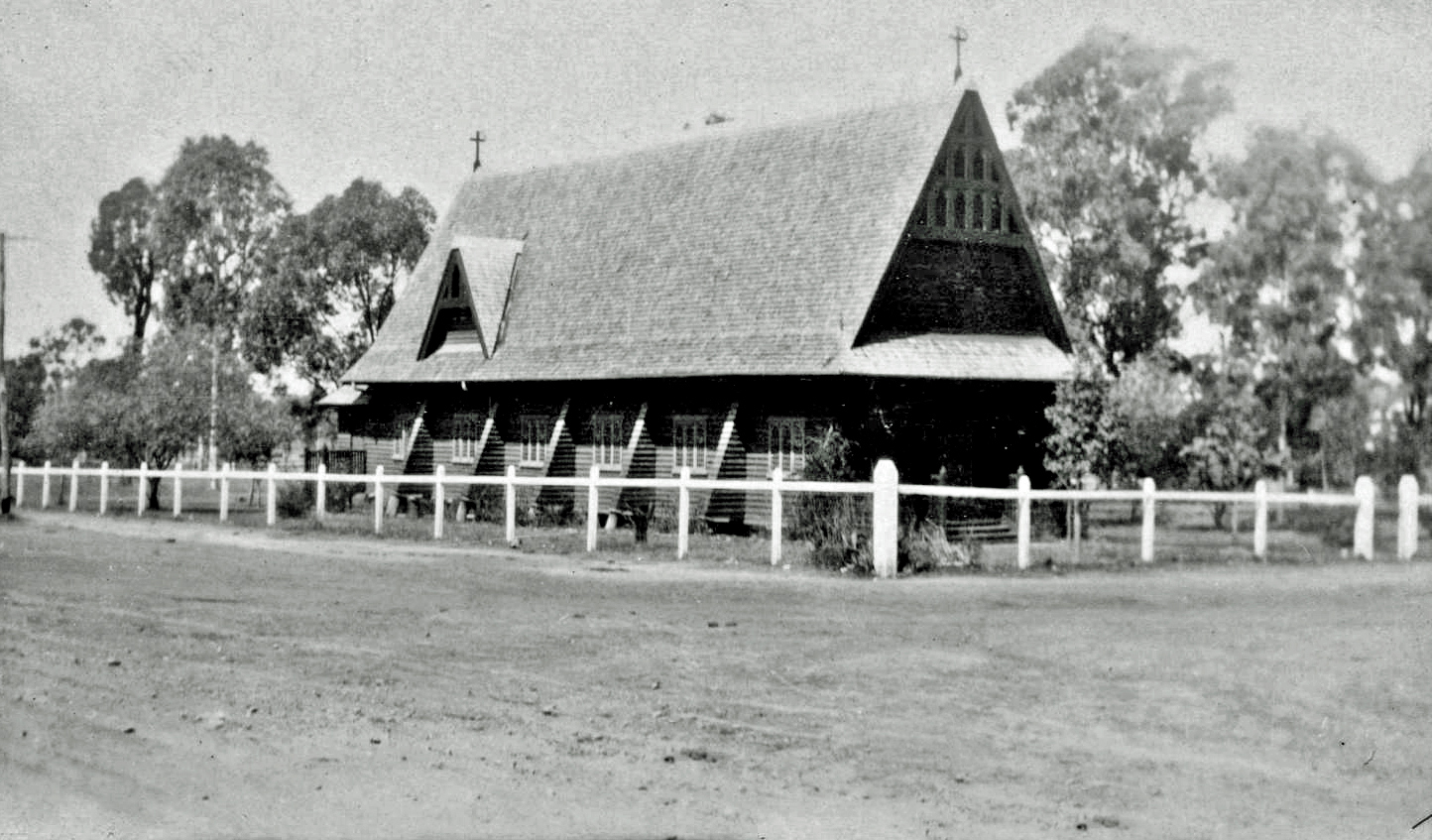
New buttresses for St Andrew's Anglican Church, Toogoolawah 1913

This timber church is set amongst mature trees on a corner site forming the northwestern boundary to McConnel Park. The church hall is located on the southern side of the building with the rectory further to the south. The building shows influences of stylistic trends popular around Federation.

The steep-pitch gable roof is clad with timber shingles and features projecting gables suggestive of a transept. The eaves slope at a lesser pitch to the main roof and carry across the gable fronts. The gables feature a dark timber grid pattern on a white background and have a cross above at the east and west end. The rear vestry has a hipped shingle roof.

The building is clad in dark painted weatherboards and sits on timber stumps. The building features timber buttresses which were added later. Internally, the buttress members are bolted to the tie beam and truss posts.

The rectangular plan has a projecting transept to the south. The floor is raised in the sanctuary, pulpit, and altar with a post-and-beam timber screen which forms two side aisles leading to the vestry. Queen-post trusses form the roof with a horizontal boarded ceiling under the collar beam which rakes away to the cornice. The ceiling features square latticed vents, and the projecting transept houses the organ and has a flat ceiling with two curved timber brackets.

Internal timber is unpainted. A carved timber cross and the organ pipes are positioned above the tie-beam in front of the transept. Internal walls are of vertically jointed boards and window units consist of three timber framed lancets with pale green leadlight glazing, some of which have stained glass inserts.

Pointed arches form the western door and vestry doors, and the highly intact interior contains original pews, some altar furniture and storage cupboards.

A round stone baptismal font is positioned at the western end of the nave and fluorescent lighting has been attached to the underside of the tie-beams. The internal walls and ceiling of the vestry are lined with fibro panels with timber cover strips.

The grounds include a number of mature trees, mainly to the south and south east of the church, screening the view from McConnel Park (which contains the Toogoolawah War Memorial).

== Heritage listing ==
St Andrew's Church was listed on the Queensland Heritage Register on 21 October 1992, having satisfied the following criteria.

The place is important in demonstrating the evolution or pattern of Queensland's history.

St Andrews' Church at Toogoolawah, erected in 1911–12, is significant historically in illustrating the establishment of the Anglican Church in Toogoolawah.

The place is important in demonstrating the principal characteristics of a particular class of cultural places.

It is a very fine example of a timber church distinguished by its scale, form and materials, and an excellent example of the ecclesiastical work of Brisbane architect Robin Smith Dods.

The place is important because of its aesthetic significance.

St Andrew's Church has a strong association with the Toogoolawah community, being an integral part of a historic, visually cohesive and picturesque precinct comprising St Andrew's church, church hall, and rectory and adjacent McConnel Park.

The place has a strong or special association with a particular community or cultural group for social, cultural or spiritual reasons.

St Andrew's Church has a strong association with the Toogoolawah community, being an integral part of an historic, visually cohesive and picturesque precinct comprising St Andrew's church, church hall, and rectory and adjacent McConnel Park.

The place has a special association with the life or work of a particular person, group or organisation of importance in Queensland's history.

The place has a special association with the McConnel family and their contribution to the establishment of the Anglican church in Toogoolawah.

== See also ==
- St Andrew's Church Hall, Toogoolawah
- St Andrew's Rectory, Toogoolawah
