= Toogoolawah =

- Town
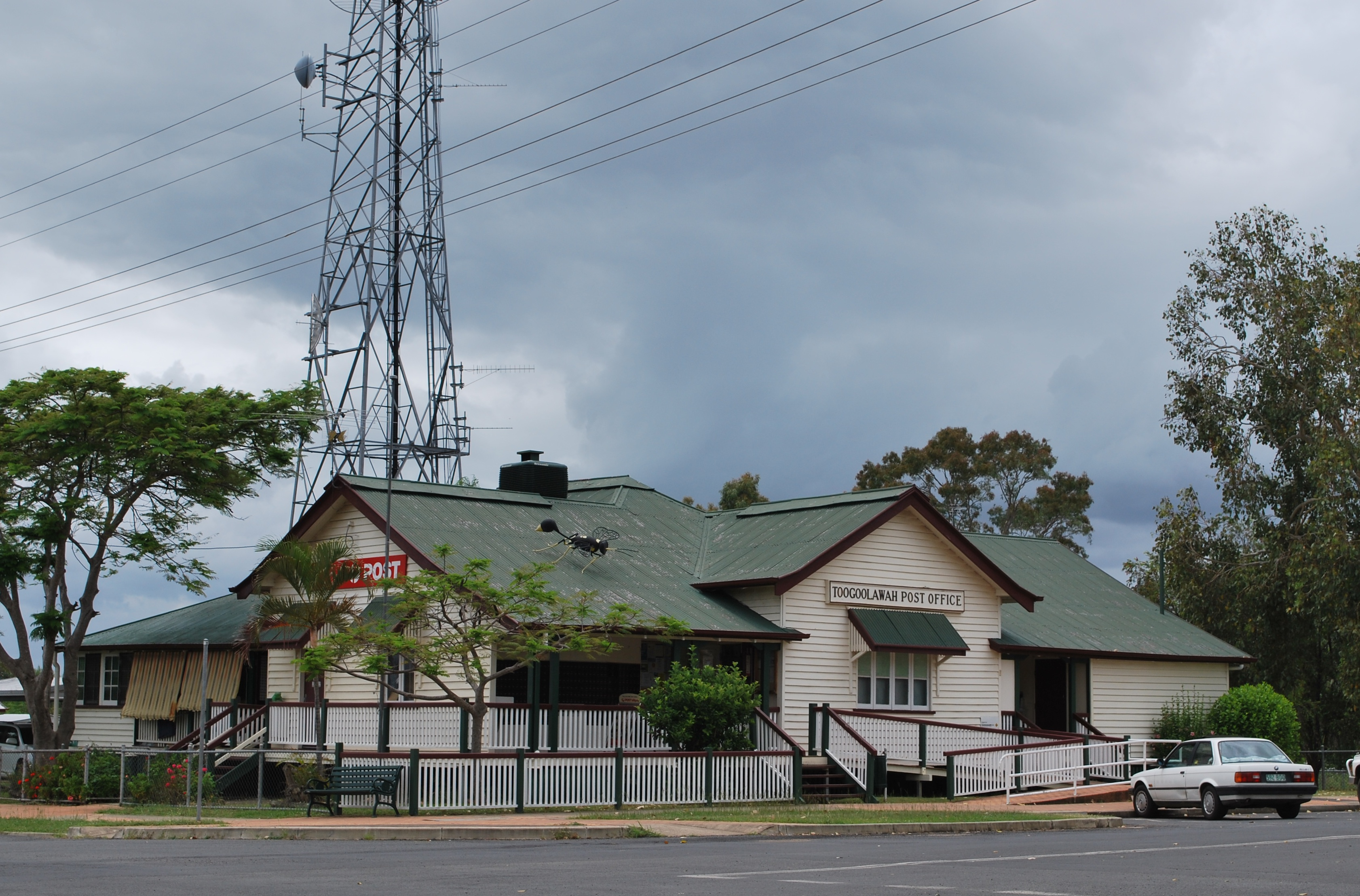
- Post office

- Interactive map of Toogoolawah
- Coordinates: 27.0852°S 152.3758°E
- Country: Australia
- State: Queensland
- LGA: Somerset Region
- Location: 18 km (11 mi) N of Esk; 82 km (51 mi) N of Ipswich; 106 km (66 mi) NW of Brisbane

Government
  - State electorate: Nanango
  - Federal division: Blair

Area
  - Total: 43.4 km^{2} (16.8 sq mi)

Population
  - Total: 1,200 (2021 census)
  - Density: 27.6/km^{2} (71.6/sq mi)
- Time zone: UTC+10:00 (AEST)
- Postcode: 4313
- County: Cavendish
- Parish: Biarra
Localities around Toogoolawah
| Ivory Creek | Braemore | Cressbrook |
| Ivory Creek | Toogoolawah | Mount Beppo |
| Biarra | Ottaba | Mount Beppo |

Toogoolawah (/tuːˈɡuːləwə/ too-GOO-lə-wə) is a rural town and locality in the Somerset Region, Queensland, Australia. In the 2021 census, Toogoolawah had a population of 1,200 people.

== Naming ==
The district was originally known as Cressbrook after the Cressbrook Station operated by James Henry McConnel. The town took its present name Toogoolawah from its former railway station, which was named in November 1903 using the name Tugulawah proposed by McConnel, the name of the McConnel's residence at Bulimba, Brisbane (now known as Bulimba House). The name is believed to be a Yuggera word meaning a crescent shape, which may refer to the Brisbane River as it rounds Bulimba Point.

== History ==
Cressbrook Provisional School was operating in 1881 but closed in 1882 due to low student numbers; its opening date is unknown.

Toogoolawah Provisional School opened on 30 May 1905. On 1 January 1909, it became Toogoolawah State School. A secondary department was added on 28 January 1975 until a separate high school opened on 25 January 1988.

On Monday 10 September 1906, St Andrew's Anglican Church Hall was opened in Toogoolwah by Archbishop St Clair Donaldson. On Sunday 12 May 1912, St Andrew's Anglican Church was dedicated by Archbishop St Clair Donaldson.

In November 1926, a fire, starting at the jewelry shop, had swept through the main street of the town. The newspaper reported the fire claimed 9 businesses and had destroyed the Exchange Hotel before the wind changed direction and subsequent rain from thunderstorms extinguished the last of the fire.

A condensed milk factory was built shortly after the railway station was opened. The factory was closed in 1929, after Nestlé moved all its condensed milk production to Victoria, resulting in the town's population decreasing by half.

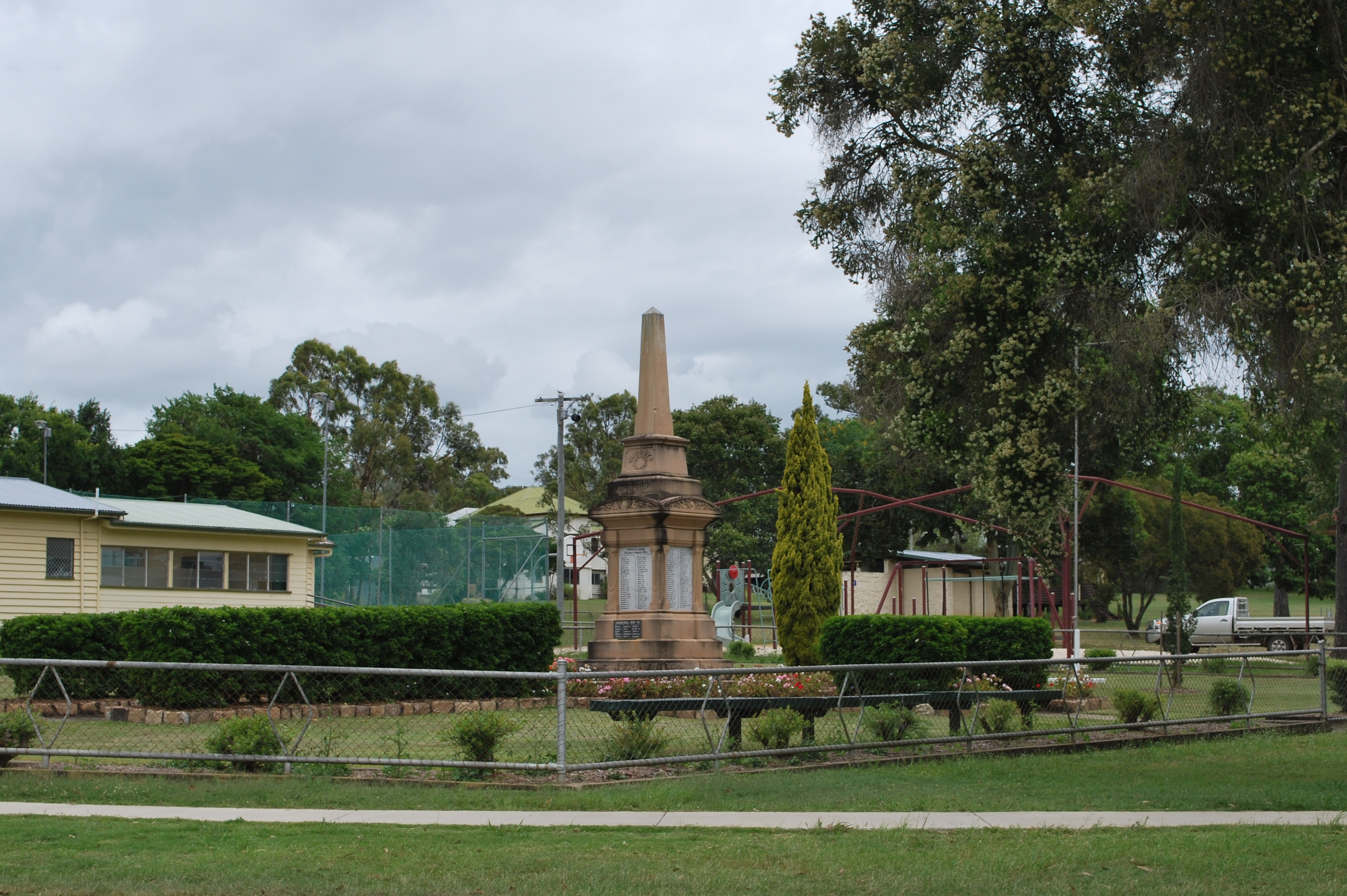
Toogoolawah War Memorial, 2010

The Toogoolawah War Memorial commemorates those who served in World War I. Unlike most war memorials that were erected after the war, the Toogoolawah memorial was unveiled during the war on 31 March 1917 by the Rev. Chaplain Merrington.

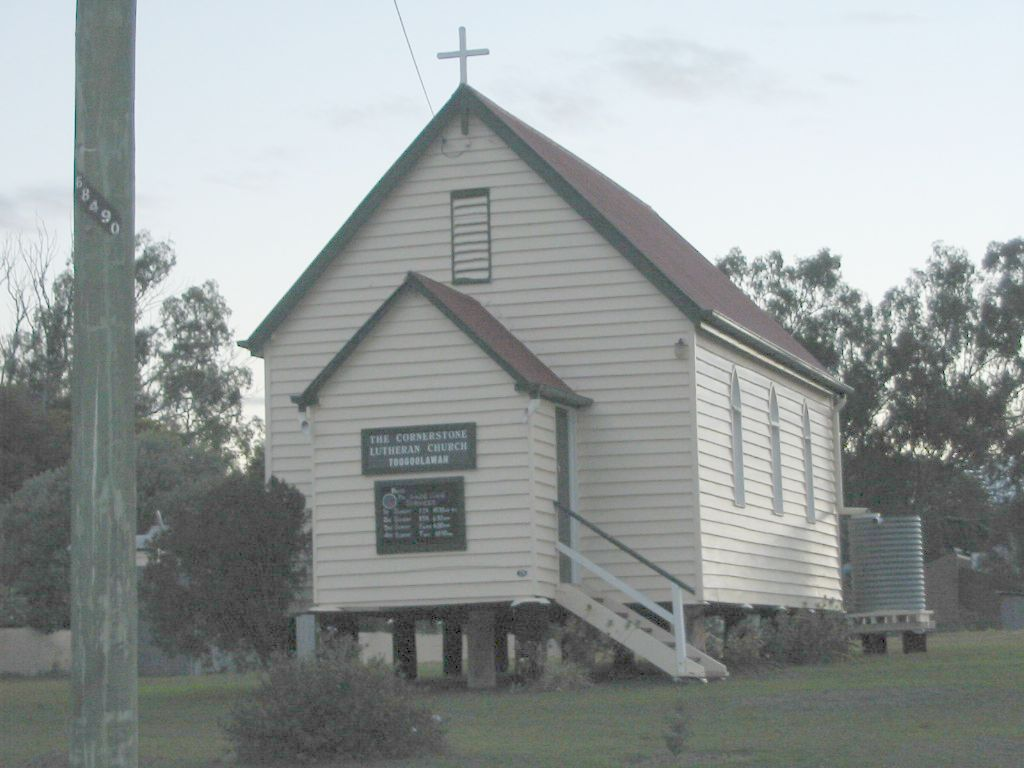
Cornerstone Lutheran Church, 2005

On 20 October 1940, a church building was relocated to Toogoolawah to reopen in Gardner Street North as the Cornerstone Lutheran Church (27.08794°S 152.37923°E). It was formerly the Bethlehem Lutheran Church in Jeebropilly, which opened on 20 April 1898, closing circa 1938.

On the 15th of September 1951 a large fire destroyed the main factory building of the defunct condensery factory which had been previously repurposed as war time storage and a facility for power generation.

Toogoolawah State High School opened on 25 January 1988, replacing the secondary department attached to Toogoolawah State School.

Toogoolawah Library had a major refurbishment in 2006.

Toogoolawah was partially cut off by flooding as a result of the 2010–2011 Queensland floods.

== Demographics ==
In the 2011 census, the locality of Toogoolawah had a population of 1,162 people.

In the 2016 census, the locality of Toogoolawah had a population of 1,279 people.

In the 2021 census, the locality of Toogoolawah had a population of 1,200 people.

== Heritage listings ==
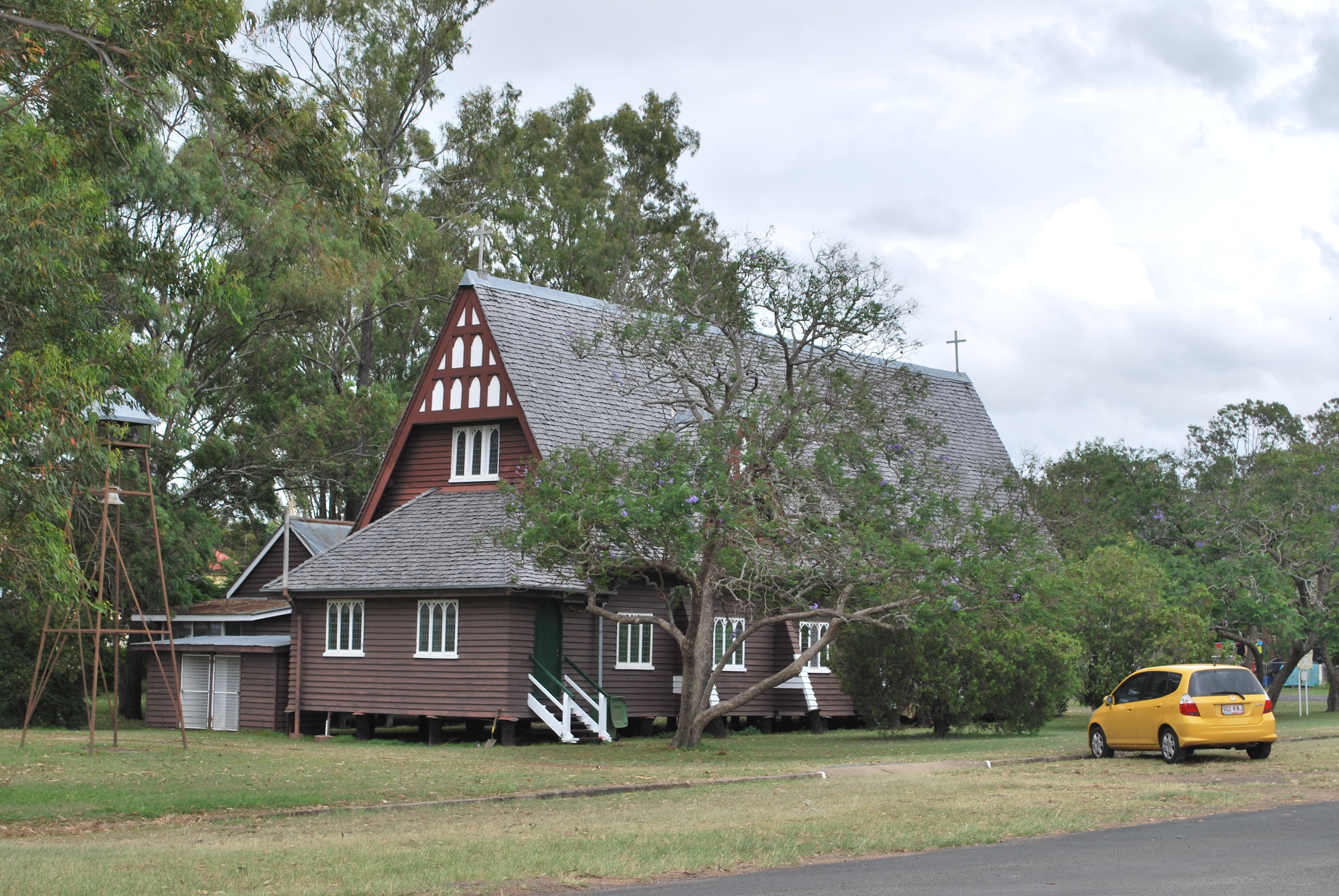
St Andrew's Anglican Church, built in 1912 in the Federation Arts and Crafts style

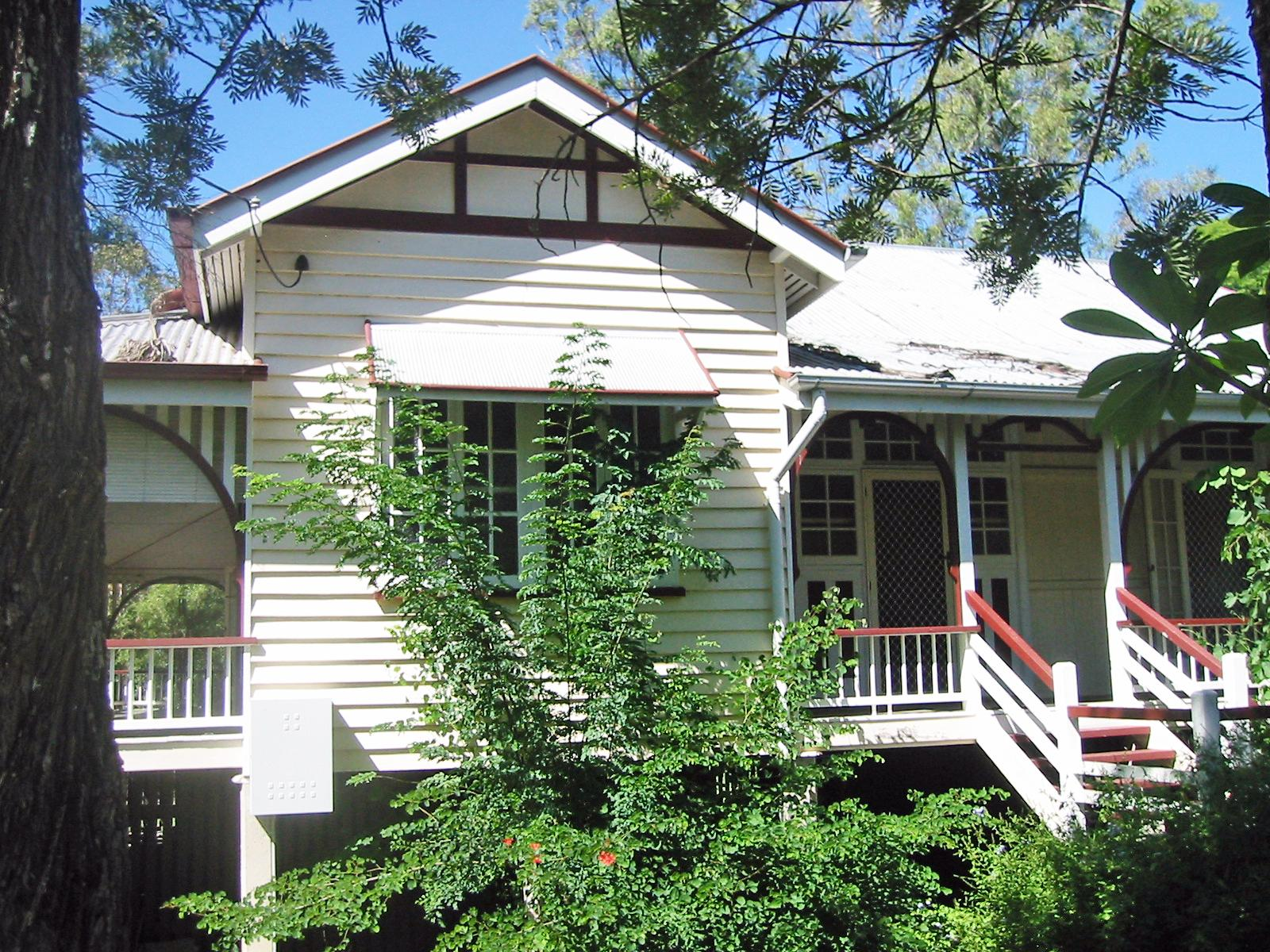
St Andrew's Rectory

Toogoolawah has a number of heritage-listed sites, including:

- Toogoolawah War Memorial, Gunyah Street (27.0906°S 152.3771°E)
- Inverness (house), 58 Fulham Street (27.0887°S 152.3718°E)
- St Andrew's Church, 2 Mangerton Street (27.0899°S 152.376°E)
- St Andrew's Church Hall, Mangerton Street (27.0901°S 152.376°E)
- St Andrew's Rectory, Mangerton Street (27.0904°S 152.376°E)

== Amenities ==
The Somerset Regional Council operate a public library at Gunyah Street.

== Education ==
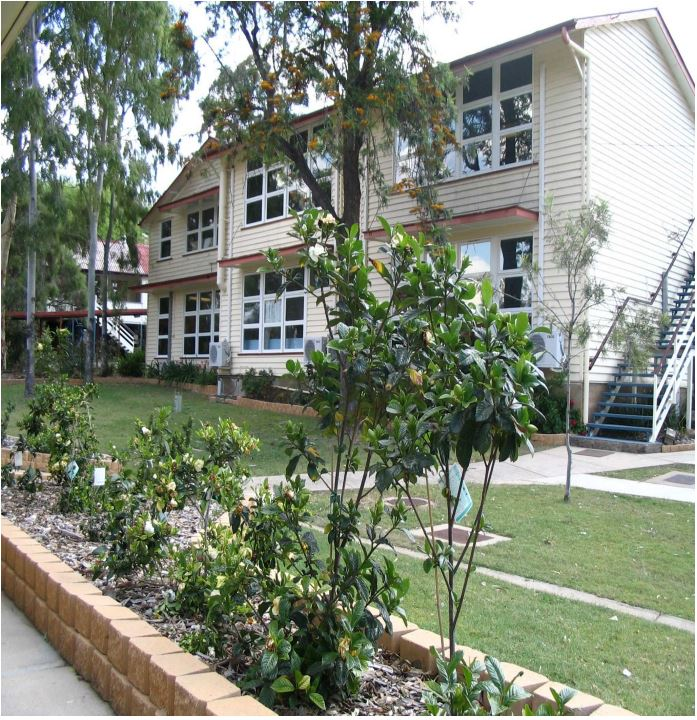
Toogoolawah State School, 2011

Toogoolawah State School is a government primary (Early Childhood to Year 6) school for boys and girls at Gardner Street (27.0917°S 152.3792°E). In 2017, the school had an enrolment of 171 students with 16 teachers (12 full-time equivalent) and 11 non-teaching staff (7 full-time equivalent).

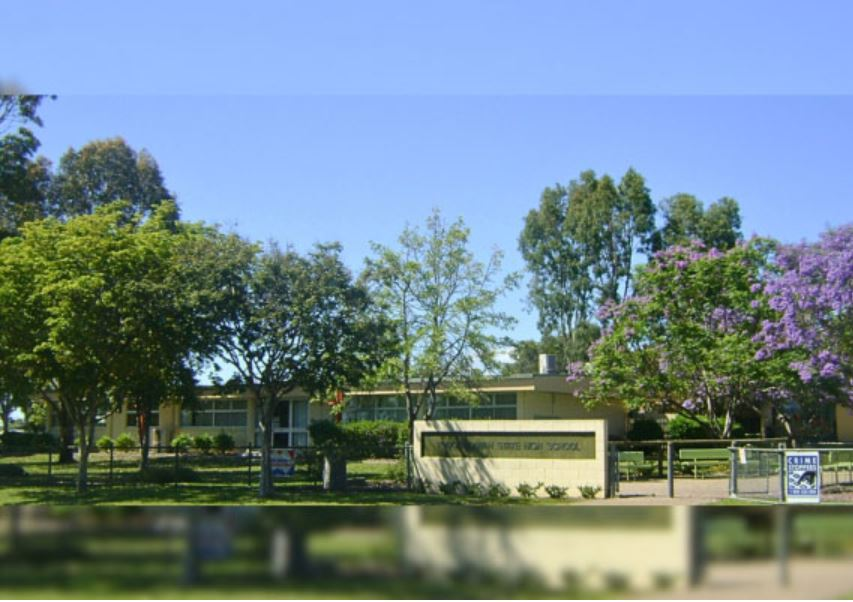
Toogoolawah State High School, 2025

Toogoolawah State High School is a government secondary (7–12) school for boys and girls at 76 Old Mount Beppo Road (27.1026°S 152.3883°E). In 2017, the school had an enrolment of 267 students with 33 teachers (29 full-time equivalent) and 22 non-teaching staff (14 full-time equivalent). Brisbane Valley Cluster Special Education Program is a primary and secondary (Early Childhood to Year 12) special education program at Toogoolawah State High School at 76 Old Mount Beppo Road (27.1026°S 152.3883°E).

== Attractions ==
Toogoolawah is home to a fun-jumping and tandem skydiving centre.

== In popular culture ==
Toogoolawah featured on the third season of The Mole in 2002.

== Notable people ==
- Frederick Lancelot Nott, dairy farmer of Toogoolawah and Member of the Queensland Legislative Assembly for the Electoral district of Stanley
