= George Appleton =

Anglican bishop and writer

The Most Reverend George Appleton CMG, MBE
- Archbishop in Jerusalem
- Church: Anglican Communion
- Province: Jerusalem and the Middle East
- Diocese: Jerusalem
- In office: 1969–1974
- Predecessor: Campbell MacInnes
- Successor: Robert Stopford
- Previous posts: Archbishop of Perth; (1963–1969); Archdeacon of London, Examining Chaplain to the Bishop of London and Canon Residentiary of St Paul's Cathedral; (1962–1963)

Orders
- Ordination: 1925 (as deacon) by Arthur Winnington-Ingram; 1926 (as priest) by William Perrin
- Consecration: 24 June 1963 by Michael Ramsey

Personal details
- Born: 20 February 1902 Windsor, Berkshire, England
- Died: 28 August 1993 (aged 91)
- Denomination: Anglicanism
- Parents: Thomas George Appleton; Lily, née Cock
- Spouse: Marjorie (Madge) (m. 1929; died 1980)
- Children: 3
- Education: Selwyn College, Cambridge; St Augustine's College, Canterbury
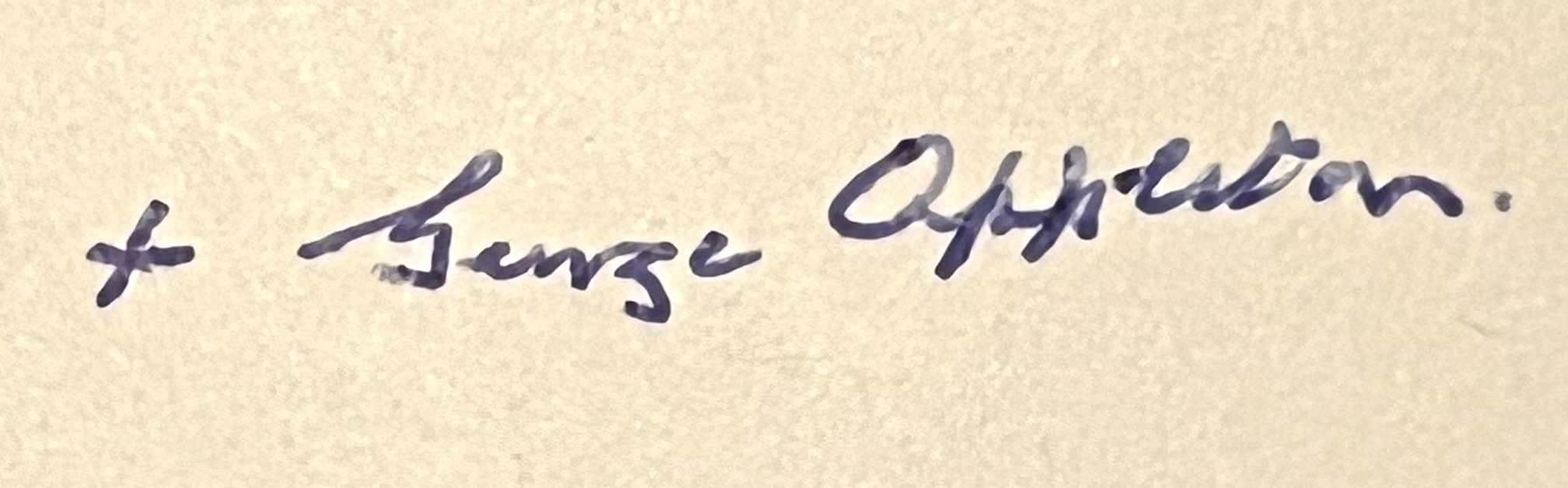
- Signature

George Frederick Appleton, CMG, MBE (20 February 1902 – 28 August 1993) was an Anglican bishop in the third quarter of the twentieth century and a writer.

== Life ==
Born in Windsor, Berkshire to Thomas George Appleton and Lily Cock, Appleton was educated at Selwyn College, Cambridge, where he gained his B.A. in 1924, followed by his M.A. in 1929. Meanwhile, he trained at St Augustine's College, Canterbury, subsequently he was ordained a deacon in 1925 and a priest at St Dunstan's, Stepney, the Stepney parish church, in 1926.

After the curacy, Appleton spent the next 20 years in Burma as a SPG missionary, ending this part of his ministry as Archdeacon of Rangoon before returning to England. He was next vicar of Headstone then rector of St Botolph's Aldgate.

He described the war-time experience of the Anglican Church in Burma in a 1946 booklet for SPG, The War and After: Burma. Before the Europeans left Burma in the face of the invading Japanese, Appleton put into place plans for Holy Communion once stores of wafers and wine had run out: local congregations would use boiled rice and tea or water or coconut milk as the elements.

In 1962, he became Archdeacon of London and a canon of St Paul's Cathedral and a year later Anglican Archbishop of Perth, Australia. In 1969 he was translated to Jerusalem. He retired in 1974, and thereafter served as Assistant Curate at St Michael, Cornhill in the Diocese of London.

A prominent writer, he was awarded the Buber-Rosenzweig Medal by the Council of Christians and Jews in 1975.

== Personal life ==
Appleton was married to Marjorie (Madge) in Holy Trinity Cathedral, Yangon (then Rangoon) in 1929. The couple had three children, Margaret, Timothy and Rachel. His wife died on 16 April 1980. He died on 28 August 1993.

== Works ==
- Glad Encounter. SPCK Publishing, 1978. ISBN 0281036071
- Daily prayer and praise. Westminster Press, 1978. ISBN 0664242510.
- Glimpses of Faith. Mowbray, 1982. ISBN 0264667883
- Prayers from a Troubled Heart. Fortress Pr, 1983. ISBN 0800617118.
- George Appleton (1984). The Quiet Heart: Prayers and meditations for each day of the year. Fortress Press. ISBN 978-0-8006-1789-9.
- Entry into Life: Gospel Of Death. Darton, Longman Todd, 1985. ISBN 0232516006
- The Heart of the Bible. HarperCollins, 1986. ISBN 0-00-626797-1
- Journey for a Soul. 1986, ASIN B000S5KMS2.
- Jerusalem Prayers for the World Today. SPCK Publishing, 1986. ISBN 0281027757.
- Understanding The Psalms. Continuum International Pub., 1988. ISBN 0264669231.
- George Appleton (1989). Hour of Glory: Meditations on the Passion. Augsburg. ISBN 978-0-8066-2438-9.
- Unfinished: George Appleton Remembers and Reflects. HarperCollins, 1990. ISBN 0-00-215379-3.
- George Appleton, ed. (2009). The Oxford Book of Prayer. Oxford: OUP. ISBN 978-0-19-956123-0. (first published by OUP 1985 ISBN 0-19-213222-9)

Anglican Communion titles
Preceded by Oswin Gibbs-Smith	Archdeacon of London; 1962–1963	Succeeded by Martin Sullivan
Preceded by Robert Moline	Archbishop of Perth; 1963–1969	Succeeded by Geoffrey Sambell
Preceded by Campbell MacInnes	Archbishop of Jerusalem; 1969–1974	Succeeded by Robert Stopford
