= Charles Riley =

Australian bishop

The Most Reverend Charles Riley
- Bishop and Archbishop of Perth
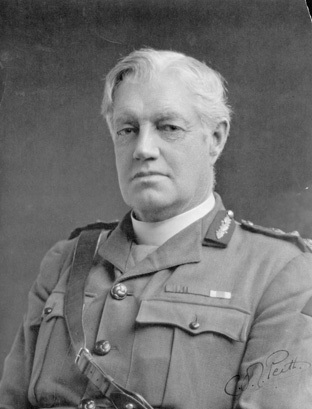
- Charles O L Riley; Chaplain General of the Australian Military Forces (1914–1918)
- Church: Church of England
- Province: Western Australia
- Diocese: Perth
- In office: 1894–1914 (as Bishop); 1914–1929 (as Archbishop)
- Predecessor: Henry Parry
- Successor: Henry Le Fanu
- Other post: Metropolitan of Western Australia (ex officio)
- Previous posts: Vicar of St Paul's Church, Preston, Lancashire; (1885–1894)

Orders
- Ordination: 1878 (as deacon); 1879 (as priest)
- Consecration: 18 October 1894

Personal details
- Born: Charles Owen Leaver Riley; 26 May 1854 Birmingham, Warwickshire, England
- Died: 23 June 1929 (aged 75) Perth, Western Australia
- Denomination: Anglican
- Parents: Lawrence William Riley; Emma, née Shaw
- Spouse: Elizabeth Merriman (m. 1886)
- Children: 6, including; Charles Lawrence Riley; Basil Riley
- Education: Heversham Grammar School; Owen's College, Manchester
- Alma mater: Caius College, Cambridge
- Military career
- Allegiance: Western Australia; Australia
- Branch: Western Australian Defence Force; Commonwealth Military Forces; Australian Military Forces
- Service years: 1895–1918
- Rank: Senior chaplain to the Western Australian Defence Force; (from 1901 part of the Commonwealth Military Forces); (1895–1914); Chaplain General of the Australian Military Forces; (1914–1918)

Charles Owen Leaver Riley (26 May 1854 – 23 June 1929) was the first Anglican Archbishop of Perth, Western Australia.

== Early years ==
Riley was born in Birmingham, Warwickshire, England, the eldest child of the Reverend Lawrence William Riley, the vicar of St Cross, Knutsford, England, and his wife Emma, née Shaw. Riley was educated at Heversham Grammar School and Owen's College, Manchester, and Caius College, Cambridge. He obtained his B.A. in 1878, his M.A. in 1881, and received an honorary D.D. in 1894. In 1878 he was ordained as a deacon in 1878, and in 1879 he was ordained as a priest. He was curate at East Bierley, Yorkshire from 1878 to 1880, Bradford from 1880 to 1882, and Lancaster from 1882 to 1885. He became vicar of St Paul's, Preston, in 1885, a position he held for nine years.

== Archbishop of Perth ==
In 1894 Riley was appointed Bishop of Perth.

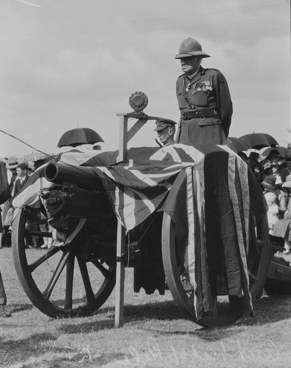
Archbishop Riley addressing a crowd as 'Chaplain-General to the AIF'

Riley arrived in Western Australia on 3 February 1895. He led the church's efforts to take over Guildford Grammar School, but frequently came into conflict with Percy Henn, the school's headmaster. He was also noted for his close association with Sir John Winthrop Hackett in working for the establishment of the University of Western Australia. He became senior chaplain of the Australian Military Forces in Western Australia and chaplain-general in 1913. Riley toured the UK, France & Egypt for 3½ months in late 1916 early 1917 enquiring into the administration of each theatre's Chaplain's Dept, returning to Australia in February 1917.

== Personal life ==
Riley married Elizabeth Merriman on 7 January 1886; subsequently they had three daughters and three sons. One of his sons, Charles Lawrence Riley (born 1888) became the Bishop of Bendigo in Victoria.

Riley was active in freemasonry, in both English and Australian jurisdictions. In 1897 in the United Grand Lodge of England he was granted the honorific rank of Past Grand Chaplain in recognition of his services to English Freemasonry, as part of a series of similar honorary promotions intended to mark the diamond jubilee of Queen Victoria. In Australian Freemasonry he is particularly notable as the longest serving Grand Master of the Western Australian Grand Lodge. He held this position from 1904 until his death, with the exception of a three-year term (1917–1920) by Sir William Ellison-Macartney.

Anglican Communion titles
| Preceded by Henry Parry | Anglican Bishop of Perth; 1894 – 1914 | Succeeded by himself as Anglican Archbishop of Perth |
| Preceded by himself as Anglican Bishop of Perth | Anglican Archbishop of Perth; 1914 – 1929 | Succeeded by Henry Le Fanu |
Academic offices
| Preceded by Sir John Winthrop Hackett | Chancellor of the University of Western Australia; 1916 – 1922 | Succeeded by Athelstan Saw |
