= Anglican Diocese of Perth =

Diocese of the Anglican Church of Australia

Diocese of Perth
- Coat of arms

Location
- Country: Australia
- Territory: Perth metropolitan area; Goldfields-Esperance; (Southern part); Wheatbelt
- Ecclesiastical province: Western Australia
- Metropolitan: Archbishop of Perth
- Headquarters: Church House; Level 5; 3 Pier Street; Perth WA 6000
- Coordinates: 31.9558°S 115.8613°E

Information
- Denomination: Anglicanism
- Rite: Book of Common Prayer; An Australian Prayer Book; A Prayer Book for Australia
- Established: 11 January 1856
- Cathedral: St George's Cathedral, Perth
- Language: English

Current leadership
- Parent church: Anglican Church of Australia
- Archbishop: Kay Goldsworthy; (since February 2018)
- Assistant bishops: Kate Wilmot; Gnamma Archdeaconry (since August 2015); Hans Christiansen; Wirrin Archdeaconry (since February 2024); David Bassett; Kundaam Archdeaconry (since February 2024)
- Dean: Chris Chataway; (since February 2020)

Website
- Diocese of Perth
- Logo of the Diocese

The Anglican Diocese of Perth is one of the 23 dioceses of the Anglican Church of Australia. The constitution of the Diocese of Perth was passed and adopted in 1872 at the first synod held in Western Australia. In 1914, the Province of Western Australia was created and the diocesan bishop of Perth became ex officio metropolitan bishop of the new province and therefore also an archbishop.

The diocese incorporates the southern part of the state of Western Australia and includes the Christmas and Cocos Islands. The other dioceses in the Anglican Province of Western Australia are the Diocese of Bunbury and the Diocese of North West Australia.

The cathedral church of the diocese is St George's Cathedral, Perth.

== History ==
The diocese is one of the 23 dioceses of the Anglican Church of Australia. The constitution of the diocese adopted in 1872 at the first synod held in Western Australia. In 1914, the Province of Western Australia was created and the diocesan bishop of Perth became ex officio metropolitan bishop of the new province and therefore also an archbishop.

The diocese incorporates the southern part of the state of Western Australia and includes the Christmas and Cocos Islands. It absorbed the Diocese of Kalgoorlie in 1972. The other dioceses in the Anglican Province of Western Australia are the Diocese of Bunbury and the Diocese of North West Australia.

Wollaston College is authorised by the Archbishop of Perth as the principal provider for theological education in the Diocese. It offers degree-level programs through its partnership with the University of Divinity.

== Churchmanship ==
The diocese has traditionally had a variety of churchmanship and in recent years has largely moved toward a more liberal and moderate Catholic style. There are, however, parishes and clergy representative of all the main Anglican traditions.

On 10 February 2018, Kay Goldsworthy became the first female archbishop in the Anglican Communion on her installation to the archdiocese.

== Administrative history ==
The Perth diocese, like all Australian dioceses, has had administrative procedures dealt with by the diocesan trustees. A range of other sub-committees of the diocese handle broader issues. The trustees were known in earlier times as the Trustees of Church Property.

The relationship of the church and government is not just from the proximity of the cathedral to government house. The land ownership and provision of favourable conditions for the diocese has occurred since establishment of the colony. The Diocesan Trustees and Diocesan Council are regularly observed to deal with significant land and building projects in the history of Perth.

In 1866, there were two archdeaconries: James Brown was Archdeacon of Perth and H. B. Thornhill of Geraldton.

== Issues ==
In the early 2000s the diocese had a large group of Anglo-Catholics from the parish of St Patricks Mt Lawley under the leadership of the then parish priest and high-ranking member of the diocesan clergy, Harry Entwistle, leave to join with another community of the Traditional Anglican Communion which later entered into the Catholic Church as a community of the Personal Ordinariate of Our Lady of the Southern Cross, St Ninians and St Chads based in Mt Lawley. The Personal Ordinariates were created for Anglicans to enter into the Catholic Church and retain many elements of Anglican worship and spirituality, while accepting all doctrines of the Catholic Church. The group cited persecution and on going doctrinal issues for their leaving.

In 2013 the synod voted to recognise diversity of sexuality within the diocese, note many Anglicans support registration of same-sex civil unions, and acknowledge legal recognition of committed same-sex unions could co-exist with legal recognition of heterosexual marriage. Archbishop Roger Herft vetoed the motion, saying that "what we have in the Diocese of course is a number of people in same-sex relationships amongst the clergy and amongst the laity and we have always said that people of all forms of sexuality and orientation are welcome." In a statement on human sexuality, Archbishop Herft confirmed that "there are gay and lesbian clergy serving in the priesthood. They are licensed by me and are honoured and respected as priests..." In April 2016, a priest in St Andrew's Church within the diocese blessed a same-sex couple's relationship. In 2022, Archbishop Kay Goldsworthy ordained as deacon a man in a same-sex civil partnership and appointed as precentor to the cathedral another man in a same-sex civil union.

== List of Bishops and Archbishops of Perth ==
=== Diocesan bishops and archbishops ===
Bishops of Perth
No	From	Until	Incumbent	Notes
1	1857	1875	Mathew Hale	Translated to Brisbane.
2	1876	1893	Henry Parry	Died in office.
3	1894	1914	Charles Riley	Became Archbishop of Perth.
Archbishops of Perth
1	1914	1929	Charles Riley	Previously Bishop of Perth; died in office.
2	1929	1946	Henry Le Fanu	Previously coadjutor bishop in Brisbane; elected Primate of Australia in 1935; died in office.
3	1947	1962	Robert Moline MC	
4	1963	1969	George Appleton CMG, MBE	Translated to Jerusalem.
5	1969	1980	Geoffrey Sambell CMG	Previously coadjutor bishop in Melbourne; died in office.
6	1981	2004	Peter Carnley AC	Elected Primate of Australia in 1999.
7	2005	2017	Roger Herft AM	Previously Bishop of Waikato and then of Newcastle.
8	2018	present	Kay Goldsworthy AO	Previously Assistant Bishop of Perth and then Bishop of Gippsland.

=== Assistant bishops ===
Assistant bishops of Perth
From	Until	Incumbent	Notes
1957	1963	Robert Freeth, Assistant Bishop of Perth	
1964	aft. 1977	Brian Macdonald, bishop coadjutor	Thomas Brian Macdonald; previously Dean of Perth (1959–1961) and Archdeacon of Perth, 1961 to 1967
1972	1978	Alfred Holland, Assistant Bishop of Perth	Translated to Newcastle
1974	1975	Denis Bryant, Assistant Bishop of Perth	Archdeacon of Northam; former Bishop of Kalgoorlie
1978	1999	Michael Challen, Assistant Bishop of Perth	Previously archdeacon.
1979	1981/2	Vernon Cornish, Assistant Bishop of Perth	see Bishop of Tasmania § Vernon Cornish
1982	1993	Brian Kyme, Assistant Bishop of Perth	
1988	1992	Ben Wright, Assistant Bishop of Perth, Goldfields Country Region	Subsequently, Bishop of Bendigo 1992–1993
1991	2006	David Murray, Bishop of the Southern Region	
1995	1998	Philip Huggins, regional bishop	Became Bishop of Grafton
1998	2005	Brian Farran, Assistant Bishop of Perth, Goldfields Country Region	Became Bishop of the Northern Region; translated to Newcastle.
1998	2003	Gerald Beaumont, Assistant Bishop of Perth, Goldfields Country Region	Subsequently, Vicar of St John's, Camberwell, VIC
2004	2006	Tom Wilmot, Assistant Bishop of Perth, Goldfields Country Region	Translated between regions
2007	2016	Tom Wilmot, Assistant Bishop of Perth, Eastern and Rural Region	Translated between regions
2006	2008	Mark Burton, Bishop of the Northern Region	Became Dean of St Paul's Cathedral, Melbourne
2008	2015	Kay Goldsworthy, Assistant Bishop of Perth	Became Bishop of Gippsland 2015–2017; elected Archbishop of Perth, August 2017.
2014	2022	Jeremy James, Assistant Bishop of Perth	Translated to Willochra
2015	current	Kate Wilmot, Assistant Bishop of Perth	Also Bishop of the Gnamma Archdeaconry
2024	current	Hans Christiansen, Assistant Bishop of Perth	Also Bishop of the Wirra Archdeaconry
2024	current	David Bassett, Assistant Bishop of Perth	Also Bishop of the Kundaam Archdeaconry

== See also ==
- St George's Cathedral, Perth
- St Bartholomew's Church
- Coogee Hotel, Western Australia, used as an orphanage by the Anglican Diocese of Perth
