= Toogoolawah War Memorial =

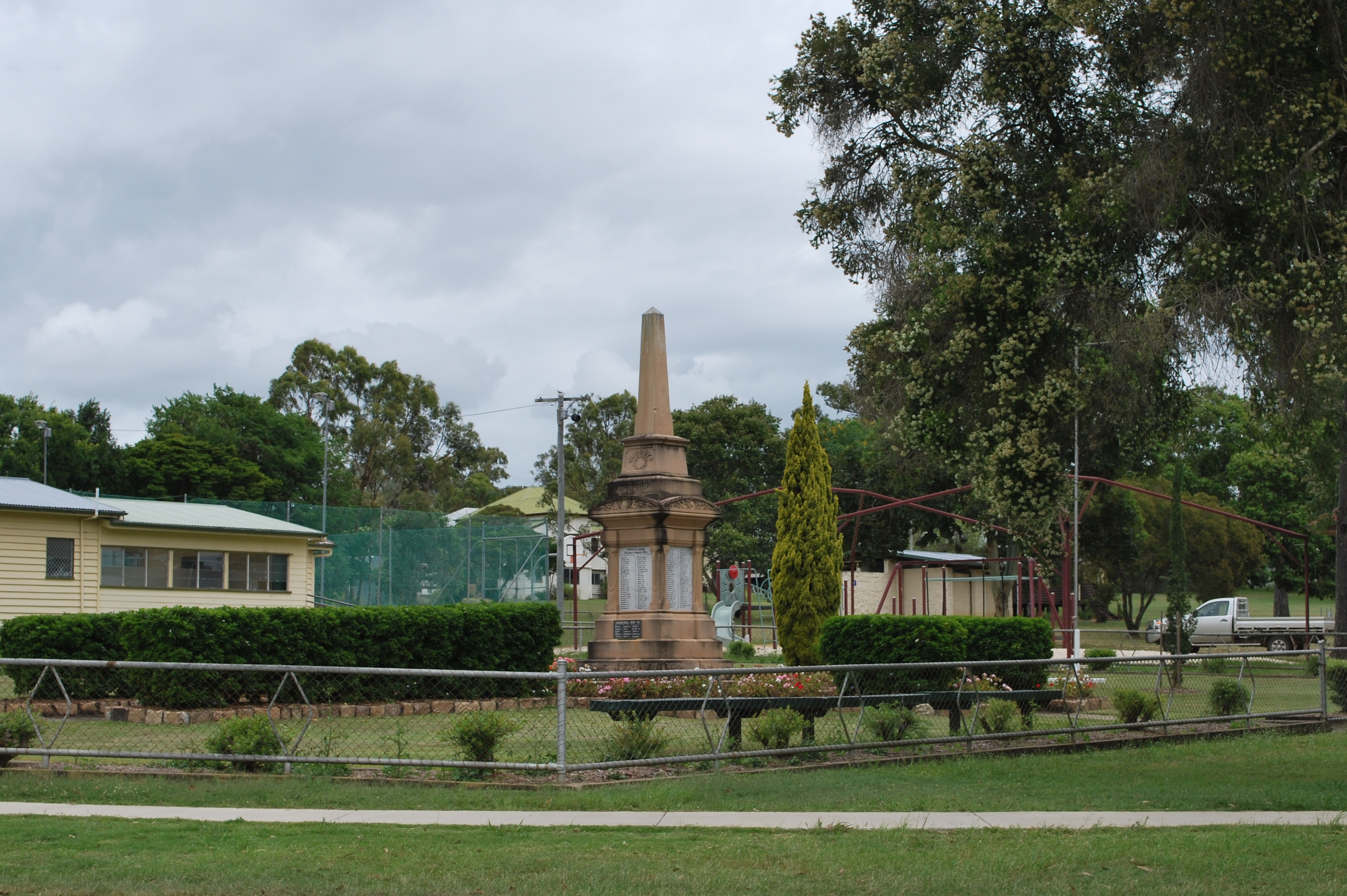
- Toogoolawah War Memorial, 2010

- Location within Queensland Location within Australia
- 27.0906°S 152.3771°E
- Location: Cressbrook Street, Toogoolawah, Somerset Region, Queensland, Australia

History
- Design period: 1900; 126 years ago – 1914; 112 years ago (early 20th century)
- Built: c.1906; 120 years ago – 1988; 38 years ago

Queensland Heritage Register
- Official name: McConnell Park & Toogoolawah War Memorial
- Type: state heritage (built, landscape)
- Designated: 21 October 1992
- Reference no.: 600499
- Significant period: 1906–(social); 1906–1988 (historical); 1906–1930 (fabric)
- Significant components: trees/plantings, pathway/walkway, library – building, memorial – obelisk, cricket pitch, bandstand/rotunda, memorial – cairn, time capsule, park / green space, bench/seat, tennis court, flagpole/flagstaff
- Builders: Frank Williams & Co

Toogoolawah War Memorial is a heritage-listed memorial within McConnel Park at Cressbrook Street, Toogoolawah, Somerset Region, Queensland, Australia. The park was built c. 1906 by Frank Williams & Co. It is also known as McConnel Park. It was added to the Queensland Heritage Register on 21 October 1992.

== History ==
The site was established as a public park and recreational facility c.1906, on land donated by James Henry McConnel of Cressbrook.

James' father, David Cannon McConnel, was the first European to settle in the Brisbane Valley, taking up the Cressbrook run in 1841. In the late 1890s, JH McConnel established a condensed milk factory on Cressbrook Creek, and subdivided a large part of the run into dairy farms and the township of Cressbrook Creek (later Toogoolawah). Such private town subdivisions were not unusual in Queensland; other towns originating in this manner include Beaudesert, Nambour and Childers.

The McConnel family was deeply involved in the economic and social development of Toogoolawah, encouraging cultural, religious, sporting recreational and economic activity. They employed a contractor to build homes for their farmers; donated land for church purposes; and promoted a variety of district clubs, organisations and societies. Their establishment of a recreational facility in the centre of town remains testimony to the family's genuine concern for community welfare.

In 1919 a brass band was formed in Toogoolawah, and about this time a small bandstand, understood to have been provided by the McConnel family, was erected in the recreational ground. By 1924 the park also contained a tennis court and a public shower, water for which was supplied from a public well and windmill on the site. A cricket pitch was laid down c.1930, and a Guide hut and Scout den were erected in the 1970s.

The property was placed under trusteeship in 1926, and the Esk Shire Council became the trustees in 1940.

The First World War stone memorial was commissioned by the citizens of Toogoolawah in 1916. It was crafted by Ipswich monumental masons Frank Williams & Co., who later supplied most of the First World War memorials in the district. The memorial, which cost £300, was unveiled on 31 March 1917 by Rev Chaplain Merrington. It was the second such memorial erected in Queensland, and the first outside a cemetery.

Originally the memorial enclosure was separated from the rest of the park by a picket fence. Gardens were laid out by 1921, and on Anzac Day that year a First World War gun was unveiled beside the memorial.

A metal plate, honouring 15 local citizens who gave their lives in the Second World War, was attached to the memorial in 1955. In 1988 two additional plaques were attached commemorating those who had served in post-1945 conflicts.

A cairn containing a time-capsule was placed in the park for the 1988 bi-centenary.

== Description ==
McConnel Park is a 2.7-hectare (6.7-acre) site fronting Cressbrook Street to the east and Gunyah Street to the north, St Andrews Anglican Church precinct to the west and residential to the south.

Access is via a bitumen drive from the western end of Gunyah Street which encircles the sportsground around to the south west. A row of trees lines the drive to the east and the entrance is between square gateposts. Next to these is a single-storeyed weatherboard library with a corrugated iron skillion roof. Two park benches with cast iron supports which contain the letters McCP are located here.

The south east corner contains a First World War memorial, bandstand, pioneer memorial, barbecue, tennis courts and children's play equipment.

The First World War memorial stands in a fenced enclosure fronting Cressbrook Street. It consists of a sandstone pedestal and obelisk standing on a stepped base of concrete and rock faced sandstone. Recessed into each side of the pedestal are First World War marble honour rolls.

The entablature has egg and dart carving and the gable above features leaf carving. The east side of the base to the obelisk has a wreath with the words OUR BOYS HONOUR. Metal plaques have been added in remembrance of those who served in Korea, Malaya, Borneo and Vietnam.

The memorial is surrounded by concrete paths with garden borders which lead from the north and east entrances. Two mature pencil pines border the east entrance with one at the north. A metal flagpole and two small pencil pines are situated on the west side and the perimeter has a low metal framed wire mesh fence.

The octagonal timber bandstand sits on timber stumps and has a corrugated iron pitched roof with a central metal finial. The building features decorative timber brackets and valance with a perimeter seat against the railing. Access is via timber stairs to the north and the ceiling has plywood sheeting with timber cover strips.

The Pioneer Memorial is a low square structure with sloping sides which is clad with slate tiles. It sits on a square slate tiled base and also contains a time capsule.

To the south of the sportsground there is a concrete block public toilet with a skillion roof and a single-storeyed weatherboard Guide hut with timber stumps and a gabled roof.

The Scout hut is located in the south west and consists of a single- storeyed slab-on-ground building with fibrous cement sheeting and a corrugated iron gabled roof.

The sportsground contains a cricket pitch and mature trees to the perimeter.

== Heritage listing ==
Toogoolawah War Memorial was listed on the Queensland Heritage Register on 21 October 1992 having satisfied the following criteria.

The place is important in demonstrating the evolution or pattern of Queensland's history.

Toogoolawah War Memorial is important in demonstrating the pattern of Queensland's history, in particular the evolution of the town of Toogoolawah.

The Toogoolawah War Memorial is important in demonstrating the pattern of Queensland's history as evidence of a widespread social movement expressing Australian patriotism and nationalism of the First World War period.

The place is important in demonstrating the principal characteristics of a particular class of cultural places.

The Toogoolawah War Memorial is important in demonstrating the principal characteristics of a class of commemorative structures erected as an enduring record of a major historical event.

The place is important because of its aesthetic significance.

Toogoolawah War Memorial is important in exhibiting a range of aesthetic characteristics valued by the local community and those interested in commemorative structure design, in particular:

- the aesthetic quality and craftsmanship of the First World War memorial, bandstand and cast iron seating
- the landmark quality of the memorial and the townscape contribution of the site

The place has a strong or special association with a particular community or cultural group for social, cultural or spiritual reasons.

The Toogoolawah War Memorial has a strong association with the local community as evidence of the local impact of a major historical event.

The place has a special association with the life or work of a particular person, group or organisation of importance in Queensland's history.

The Toogoolawah War Memorial has a strong association with the McConnel family.
