= Gerald Beaumont =

Australian Anglican bishop

Gerald Edward Beaumont
- Other posts: Vicar of St John's Camberwell, Victoria
- Previous post: Assistant Bishop in the Diocese of Perth (1998–2003)

Orders
- Ordination: 1969

Personal details
- Born: February 18, 1940 Australia
- Died: July 10, 2024 (aged 84) Australia
- Denomination: Anglican
- Education: Australian College of Theology

Gerald Edward Beaumont (18 February 1940 – 10 July 2024) was an Australian Anglican bishop.

Beaumont studied theology with the Australian College of Theology and was ordained in 1969. His first post was at St Andrew's Brighton, Victoria. He then served at West Geelong, Mooroolbark, Hawksburn and East Melbourne. He was an assistant bishop in the Diocese of Perth, responsible for the Goldfields Country Region, from 1998 to 2003. Afterwards he was vicar of St John's Camberwell, Victoria.

== Ecclesiastical Roles ==
=== Assistant Bishop in the Diocese of Perth (1998–2003) ===
Beaumont served as Assistant Bishop, responsible for the Goldfields Country Region, which covered an area of approximately 330,000 square kilometers. During his tenure, he highlighted the challenges of ministering in such a large and sparsely populated area, advising his successor to focus on maintaining steady leadership and continuous learning.

=== Vicar of St John's Camberwell, Victoria ===
After his episcopal service, Beaumont served as the vicar of St John's Camberwell, where he continued his pastoral duties and supported the spiritual life of the community.
