= Henry Le Fanu =

Australian bishop (1870–1946)

The Most Reverend Henry Le Fanu
- Archbishop of Perth
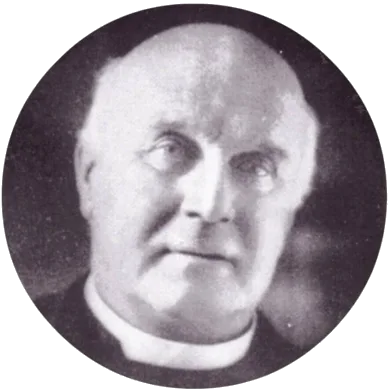
- Church: Church of England
- Province: Western Australia
- Diocese: Perth
- In office: 1929–1946
- Predecessor: Charles Riley
- Successor: Robert Moline
- Other posts: Metropolitan of Western Australia; (ex officio); Primate of Australia; (1935–1946)
- Previous posts: Coadjutor Bishop of Brisbane; (1915–1929); Canon Residentiary and Archdeacon of St John's Cathedral, Brisbane; (1904–1915)

Orders
- Ordination: 1894 (as deacon); 1895 (as priest)
- Consecration: 21 September 1915 by St Clair Donaldson

Personal details
- Born: Henry Frewen Le Fanu; 1 April 1870 Dublin, Ireland
- Died: 9 September 1946 (aged 76) Perth, Western Australia
- Denomination: Anglican
- Parents: William Richard Le Fanu; Henrietta Victorine, née Barrington
- Spouse: Mary (Margery) Annette Ingle née Dredge (m. 1904; died 1926); Winifred Maud Whiteley (m. 1941)
- Children: 3 sons, 3 daughters
- Education: Haileybury College
- Alma mater: Keble College, Oxford; Wells Theological College

Henry Frewen Le Fanu (1 April 1870 – 9 September 1946) was an Anglican bishop in Australia.

== Early life ==
Le Fanu was born in Dublin, Ireland. He was educated at Haileybury, Keble College, Oxford and Wells Theological College.

== Religious life ==
Le Fanu was ordained in 1894, he began his ecclesiastical career as a curate in Poplar, London. From 1899 to 1901 he was Chaplain to the Bishop of Rochester after which he held a similar post at Guy's Hospital. Emigrating to Australia he was successively Canon Residentiary and Archdeacon of St John's Cathedral, Brisbane (1904–1915), Coadjutor Bishop of Brisbane (1915–1929), Archbishop of Perth and Primate of Australia. He was consecrated a bishop on 21 September 1915 at the cathedral by St Clair Donaldson, Archbishop of Brisbane, and appointed a Sub-Prelate of the Order of St John of Jerusalem. In 1936 he received the Lambeth degree of Doctor of Divinity conferred by the Archbishop of Canterbury.

== Legacy ==
His former house in Cottesloe, Western Australia is named after him.

Anglican Communion titles
Preceded by Charles Riley	Archbishop of Perth; 1929–1946	Succeeded by Robert Moline
Preceded by John Wright	Primate of Australia; 1935–1946	Succeeded by Howard Mowll
