= Anglican Archbishop of Perth =

Anglican archibishop of Perth, Western Australia

Archbishop of Perth
- Archbishopric

anglican
- Coat of arms of the Diocese
- Incumbent: Kay Goldsworthy since 10 February 2018
- Style: The Most Reverend

Location
- Country: Australia
- Ecclesiastical province: Western Australia
- Residence: Perth

Information
- First holder: Mathew Hale
- Denomination: Anglicanism
- Established: Bishopric in 1857; Archbishopric in 1914
- Diocese: Perth
- Cathedral: St George's Cathedral, Perth

Website
- Diocese of Perth

The Archbishop of Perth is the diocesan bishop of the Anglican Diocese of Perth, Anglican Church of Australia and ex officio metropolitan bishop of the ecclesiastical Province of Western Australia.

== List of Bishops and Archbishops of Perth ==
Bishops of Perth
No	From	Until	Incumbent	Notes
1	1857	1875	Mathew Hale	Translated to Brisbane.
2	1876	1893	Henry Parry	Died in office.
3	1894	1914	Charles Riley	Became Archbishop of Perth.
Archbishops of Perth
1	1914	1929	Charles Riley	Previously Bishop of Perth; died in office.
2	1929	1946	Henry Le Fanu	Previously coadjutor bishop in Brisbane; elected Primate of Australia in 1935; died in office.
3	1947	1962	Robert Moline MC	
4	1963	1969	George Appleton CMG, MBE	Translated to Jerusalem.
5	1969	1980	Geoffrey Sambell CMG	Previously coadjutor bishop in Melbourne; died in office.
6	1981	2004	Peter Carnley AC	Elected Primate of Australia in 1999.
7	2005	2017	Roger Herft AM	Previously Bishop of Waikato and then of Newcastle.
8	2018	present	Kay Goldsworthy AO	Previously Assistant Bishop of Perth and then Bishop of Gippsland.

== See also ==
- Archdiocese of Perth, the Latin Church metropolitan archdiocese of the Catholic Church in Australia
