= McCall =

McCall comes from the Gaelic surname of Scottish origin, which means "son of the battle chief". The McCall family was born on the Scottish west coast among the ancient Dalriadan clans.

Notable people with this surname include:

- Andy McCall (footballer, born 1911) (1911–1979), Scottish footballer and manager
- Andy McCall (footballer, born 1925) (1925–2014), Scottish footballer, father of Stuart McCall
- Annie McCall (1859–1949), English doctor
- Anthony McCall (born 1946), British artist
- Archie McCall (1867–1936), Scottish footballer
- Bruce McCall (1935–2023), Canadian author
- Carl McCall (born 1935), American politician
- Christina McCall (1935–2005), Canadian political writer
- Daniel T. McCall Jr. (1909–2000), justice of the Supreme Court of Alabama
- David McCall (bishop) (1940–2021), Australian Anglican bishop, husband of Marion
- Davina McCall (born 1967), British television presenter
- Don McCall (1944–2025), American football player
- Duke Kimbrough McCall (1914–2013), U.S. religious leader
- Duncan McCall (1769–1832), Canadian politician
- Edward McCall (1790–1853), U.S. Navy officer
- Frederick McCall (1896–1949), Canadian aviator, World War I ace, businessman
- George A. McCall (1802–1868), U.S. Army general and amateur naturalist
- Glenn McCall (1954–2025), American politician
- Grayson McCall (born 2000), American football player
- Guadalupe Garcia McCall, Mexican-American poet and novelist
- Helen McCall (1899–1956), Canadian photographer
- Henry McCall (1895–1980), Royal Navy officer
- Henry McCall (baseball) (1907–1998), American baseball player
- Henry Strong McCall (1819–1893), American lawyer and writer
- Ian McCall (footballer) (born 1965), Scottish footballer
- J. P. McCall, songwriting pseudonym of Peter Dawson (bass-baritone)
- Jack McCall (1850s–1877), U.S. outlaw
- James McCall (footballer) (1865–1925), Scottish footballer
- James McCall (politician) (1774–1856), American merchant and politician from New York
- James McCall (veterinary surgeon) (1834–1915), founder and the first principal of Glasgow Veterinary College
- John E. McCall (1859–1920), judge and politician from Tennessee
- John T. McCall (1863–1950), New York politician
- Kevin McCall (born 1985), American rapper
- Louis A. McCall Sr. (1951–1997), American singer, songwriter, drummer and co-founder of the funk/R&B band Con Funk Shun
- Macklin McCall, Canadian politician
- Marion McCall (born 1943), Australian pilot, wife of David
- Marquan McCall (born 1999), American football player
- Mary C. McCall Jr. (1904–1986), American screenwriter
- Matt McCall (racing driver) (born 1981), American stock car racing driver and crew chief
- Oliver McCall (born 1965), U.S. boxer
- Patrick Joseph McCall (1861–1919), Irish songwriter (also known as P. J. McCall)
- Phil McCall (1925–2002), Scottish actor
- Robert McCall (disambiguation), multiple people
- Robin McCall (born 1964), American stock car racing driver
- Roz McCall (born 1969), Scottish politician
- Samuel W. McCall (1851–1923), U.S. politician
- Shelagh McCall, Scottish lawyer
- Steve McCall (born 1960), English footballer
- Stuart McCall (born 1964), Scottish footballer
- Tahjere McCall (born 1994), American basketball player
- Ted McCall (1901–1975), Canadian journalist and comic strip writer
- Thomas McCall (disambiguation), several people
- Tom McCall (1913–1983), U.S. politician
- William McCall (disambiguation), several people
- Willie McCall (footballer, born 1898) (1898–1966), Scottish footballer
- Willie McCall (footballer born 1920) (1920–1985), Scottish footballer

Fictional characters include:

- the title character of Cash McCall, a 1960 film starring James Garner
- Robert McCall, star of The Equalizer, a 1980s American television series; The Equalizer, a 2014 film loosely based on the television series; The Equalizer 2, a 2018 sequel; and The Equalizer, a 2020 television series
- Scott McCall, protagonist of the television series Teen Wolf
- Sgt. Dee Dee McCall, co-star of the 1980s detective television series Hunter

== See also ==
- George Russell MacCall (1918–2008), American tennis player
- Henry MacCall (1845–1921), British Army officer
- William Maccall (1812–1888), Scottish writer and minister
- MacColl
