= Anglican Bishop of Willochra =

Bishop of Willochra
- Bishopric

anglican
- Coat of arms of the Diocese
- Incumbent: Jeremy James
- Style: The Right Reverend

Location
- Country: Australia
- Ecclesiastical province: South Australia
- Residence: Bishop's House, Gladstone

Information
- First holder: Gilbert White
- Denomination: Anglicanism
- Established: 1915
- Diocese: Willochra
- Cathedral: Cathedral of Ss Peter and Paul, Port Pirie

Website
- Diocese of Willochra

The Bishop of Willochra is the diocesan bishop of the Anglican Diocese of Willochra, Australia.

On 29 October 2022, the diocese elected Jeremy James, formerly assistant bishop in the Anglican Diocese of Perth, as its next bishop, replacing John Stead who had retired on 2 July 2022. Bishop Jeremy James was installed on 25 February 2023.

== List of Bishops of Willochra ==
Bishops of Willochra
No	From	Until	Incumbent	Notes
1	1915	1925	Gilbert White	Translated from Carpentaria.
2	1926	1958	Richard Thomas	Previously Archdeacon of North Queensland; died in office.
3	1958	1969	Tom Jones	
4	1970	1987	Bruce Rosier AM	Previously an assistant bishop in Perth.
5	1987	2000	David McCall	Translated to Bunbury.
6	2000	2011	Garry Weatherill	Previously Archdeacon of Willochra; translated to Ballarat.
7	2012	2022	John Stead	Previously Assistant Bishop of Bathurst, based in Dubbo; installed 30 June 2012; retired 2 July 2022.
8	2023		Jeremy James	Previously Assistant Bishop of Perth (2014–2022).
