= Anglican Bishop of Ballarat =

Bishop of Ballarat
- Bishopric

anglican
- Coat of arms of the diocese
- Incumbent: Garry Weatherill since 5 November 2011
- Style: The Right Reverend

Location
- Country: Australia
- Ecclesiastical province: Victoria

Information
- First holder: Samuel Thornton
- Denomination: Anglicanism
- Established: 1875
- Diocese: Ballarat
- Cathedral: Cathedral of Christ the King, Ballarat

Website
- ballaratanglican.org.au

The Bishop of Ballarat is the diocesan bishop of the Anglican Diocese of Ballarat, Australia.

== List of bishops ==
Bishops of Ballarat
No	From	Until	Incumbent	Notes
1	1875	1900	Samuel Thornton	Returned to England and became an honorary assistant bishop in Manchester.
2	1901	1915	Arthur Green	Translated from Grafton and Armidale.
3	1917	1927	Maxwell Maxwell-Gumbleton	Returned to England and became an honorary assistant bishop in Ipswich; later Bishop of Dunwich.
4	1927	1935	Philip Crick	Translated from Rockhampton.
5	1936	1960	William Johnson	Previously Dean of Newcastle.
6	1961	1975	William Hardie	Previously Dean of Newcastle.
7	1975	1993	John Hazlewood	Previously Dean of Perth.
8	1994	2003	David Silk	Previously Archdeacon of Leicester; returned to England and became an honorary assistant bishop in the Diocese of Exeter and, subsequently, a Roman Catholic priest.
9	2003	2010	Michael Hough	Previously Bishop of the New Guinea Islands (1996–1998), Bishop of Port Moresby (1998–2001)
10	2011	present	Garry Weatherill	Translated from Willochra.
