= Garry Weatherill =

Australian Anglican bishop (born 1956)

The Right Reverend Garry Weatherill
- Bishop of Ballarat
- Weatherill in 2026
- Church: Anglican Church of Australia
- Province: Victoria
- Diocese: Ballarat
- In office: Since 2011
- Predecessor: Michael Hough
- Previous post: Bishop of Willochra (2000–2011)

Orders
- Ordination: 1987

Personal details
- Born: October 3, 1956
- Education: University of Adelaide; Flinders University; St Barnabas Theological College

Garry John Weatherill (born 3 October 1956) is an Australian Anglican bishop. He is the current Anglican Bishop of Ballarat in the province of Victoria. He was previously the sixth Bishop of Willochra (2000–2011).

Weatherill was educated at the University of Adelaide and Flinders University. He worked as a teacher for several years before entering St Barnabas Theological College in 1983. He was ordained in 1987, and began his ordained ministry as a curate at St Jude's Church, Brighton, South Australia, after which he was an assistant at St Peter's Cathedral, Adelaide, until 1990. He was then rector of Semaphore which later incorporated the parish of Port Adelaide. He was then a ministry development officer in the Diocese of Willochra, resident in Crystal Brook. He had been archdeacon in the diocese before his election as bishop and subsequent ordination to the episcopate in 2000.

It was announced in 2011 that Weatherill had been elected as the next Bishop of Ballarat. He was installed on 5 November 2011.

Weatherill has shown his support for social welfare and community-based charities such as Anglicare, telling its annual meeting in 2017 that "I think that model of doing things small and local is something that the rest of social organisations in Australia sometimes need to recapture.". He declared his support for same-sex marriage in the Australian government plebiscite of 2017. Weatherill has also made a public apology on behalf of the Diocese of Ballarat for abuse reported by past students of Ballarat and Queen's Anglican Grammar School within the diocese.

Anglican Communion titles
Preceded by David McCall	Bishop of Willochra; 2000–2011	Succeeded by John Stead
Preceded by Michael Hough	Bishop of Ballarat; 2011–present	Incumbent
