= Church hall =

Space in a church building for community use

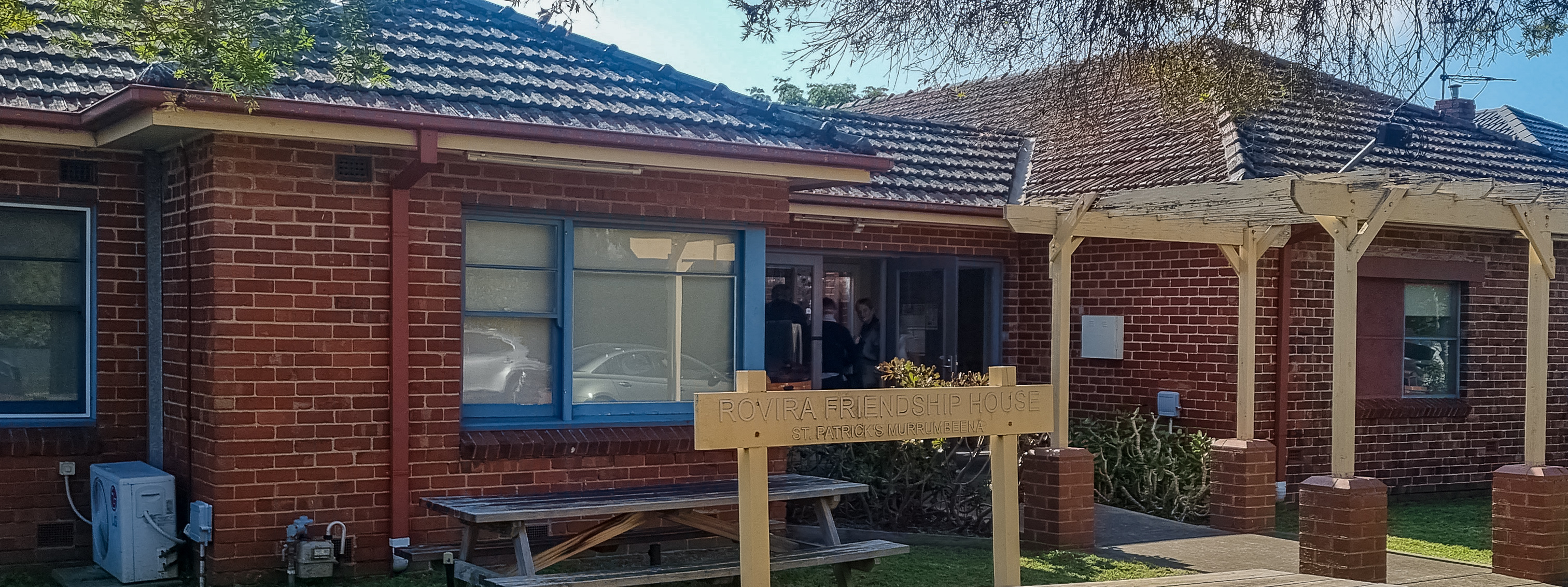
Rovira Friendship House in Victoria, Australia is owned by the Catholic Church and used for events.

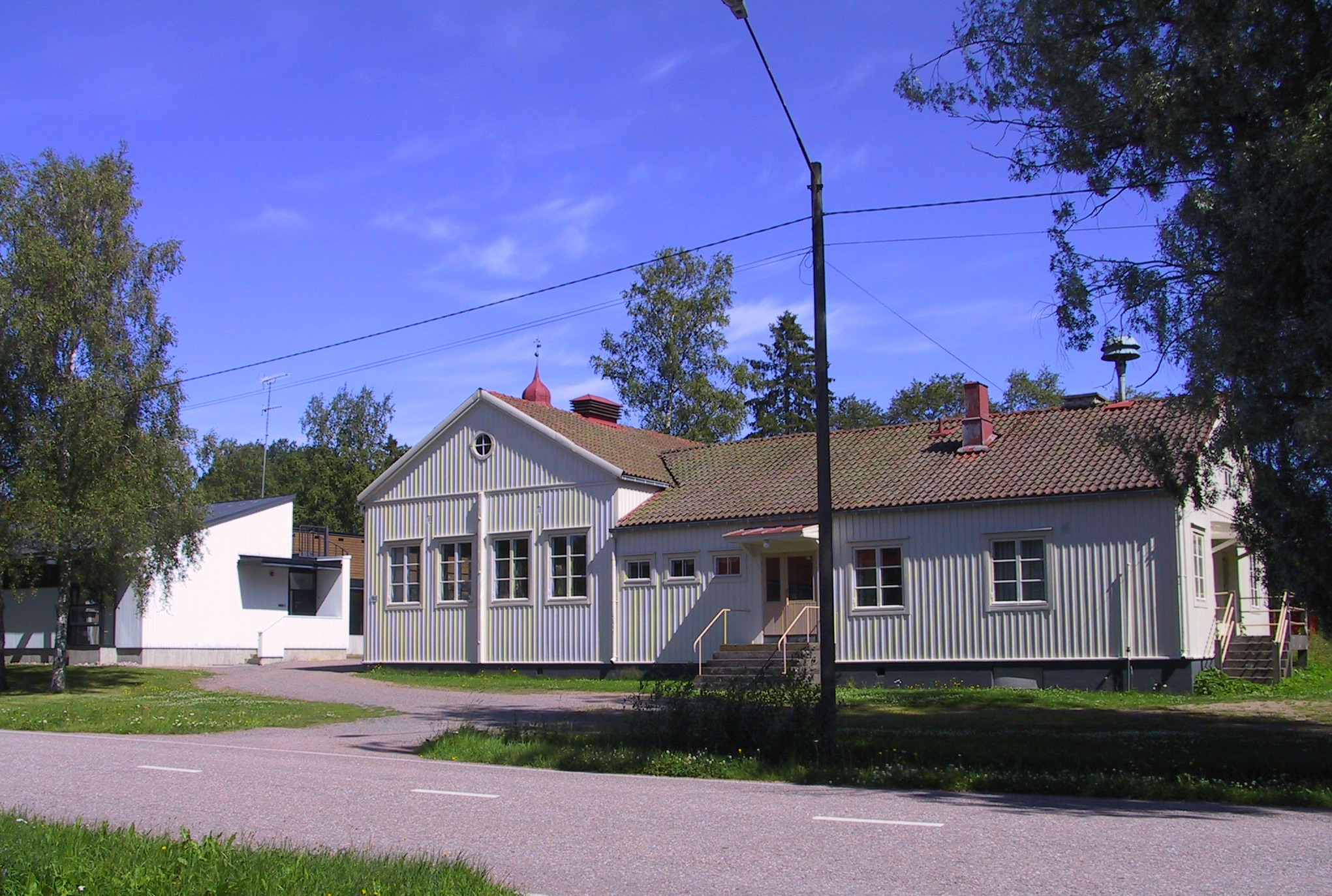
Pöytyä church hall in Finland during a 2008 July day.

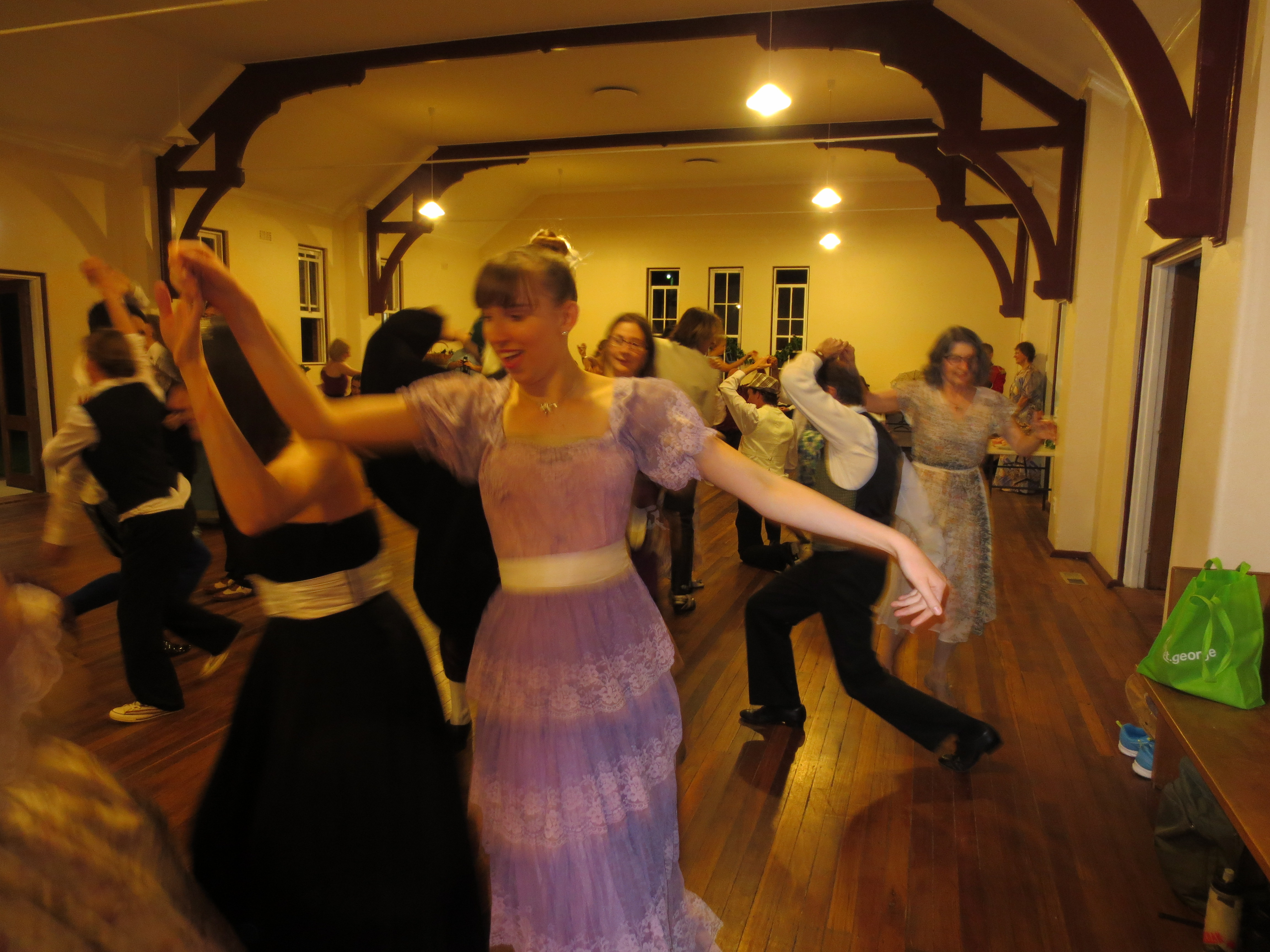
The All Saints Church hall in Canberra, Australia being used for a community dance in November 2015.

A church hall or parish hall is a room or building associated with a church, generally for community and charitable use. In smaller and village communities, it is often a separate building near the church, while on more restricted urban sites it may be in the basement or a wing of the main church building. Activities in the hall are not necessarily religious, but parts of local community life, similar to an assembly hall.

== See also ==
- Chapter house
- Community centre
- Fellowship hall
- Hall church
- Rectory
- Refectory
- Village hall
