= Bishop of Ballarat =

Bishop of Ballarat may refer to:

- Anglican Bishop of Ballarat
- Roman Catholic Bishop of Ballarat
