= Diocese of Albany =

Diocese of Albany may refer to:

- Roman Catholic Diocese of Albany, New York, United States
- Episcopal Diocese of Albany, New York, United States

== See also ==
- Diocese of Albano, a suburbicarian see of the Roman Catholic Church in Italy
- Warwick Bastian, assistant bishop in the Anglican Diocese of Bunbury, Australia, (1968-1979) with the title Bishop of Albany
