= Anglican Diocese of Bunbury =

Diocese of the Anglican Church of Australia

Diocese of Bunbury
- Coat of arms

Location
- Country: Australia
- Territory: South West; Great Southern; Peel
- Ecclesiastical province: Western Australia
- Metropolitan: Archbishop of Perth
- Headquarters: 7 Oakley Street; Bunbury WA 6230
- Coordinates: 33°19′53″S 115°38′16″E

Information
- Denomination: Anglicanism
- Rite: Book of Common Prayer; An Australian Prayer Book; A Prayer Book for Australia
- Established: 1904
- Cathedral: St Boniface Cathedral, Bunbury
- Language: English

Current leadership
- Parent church: Anglican Church of Australia
- Bishop: Ian Coutts; (since November 2018)
- Dean: Darryl Cotton; (since 2016)

Website
- Diocese of Bunbury

The Anglican Diocese of Bunbury is a diocese of the Anglican Church of Australia which was founded in 1904 and covers the south of the State of Western Australia. Together with Perth and North West Australia, it is one of the three diocese of the Province of Western Australia. The diocese's cathedral since 1962 is St Boniface Cathedral in Bunbury. The current Bishop of Bunbury, since 3 November 2018, is Ian Coutts.

== Cathedral ==
The cathedral church of the diocese is Saint Boniface Cathedral in Bunbury. The cathedral is of brick construction in a modernist style with a prominent clock tower at the east end crowning the sanctuary. The foundation stone was laid in 1961 and the cathedral was consecrated on 14 October 1962. Prior to 1962, the diocese was based at St Paul's Pro-Cathedral, which was constructed in 1866 on the site of an earlier church. St Paul's, previously only a parish church, had been named a pro-cathedral in 1903 in preparation for Bunbury gaining diocesan status the following year. It was demolished in 1963. However, the rectory still survives as the Bunbury Women's Club.

== Bishops of Bunbury ==
=== Diocesan bishops ===
Bishops of Bunbury
No	From	Until	Incumbent	Notes
1	1904	1917	Frederick Goldsmith	Previously Dean of Perth; resigned and returned to England.
2	1917	1937	Cecil Wilson	Translated from Melanesia; retired.
3	1938	1950	Leslie Knight	Died in office.
4	1951	1957	Donald Redding	Returned to parish ministry.
5	1957	1977	Ralph Hawkins	Retired.
6	1977	1983	Stanley Goldsworthy	Previously Archdeacon of Wangaratta; returned to parish ministry.
7	1984	2000	Hamish Jamieson	Translated from Carpentaria.
8	2000	2010	David McCall	Translated from Willochra.
9	2010	2017	Allan Ewing	Previously an assistant bishop in Canberra and Goulburn.
10	2018	present	Ian Coutts	Installed 3 November 2018.

=== Assistant bishops ===
From 1968 to 1979, Warwick Bastian was coadjutor bishop, with the title Bishop of Albany.

== Coat of arms ==
Granted by the College of Arms in 1953, the coat of arms of the diocese is:

Argent two Swords in saltire points upwards proper hilts and pomels Or on a Chief per pale Azure and Gules four Estoiles in cross of the first and a three masted Ship in full sail also proper.

== See also ==
- St Boniface's Church, Bunbury England
- Saint Boniface Cathedral, Winnipeg
