= Bishop of Port Pirie =

Bishop of Port Pirie may refer to:

- Anglican Bishop of Willochra
- Bishop of the Roman Catholic Diocese of Port Pirie
