= McAll =

McAll is a surname. Notable people with the surname include:

- Barney McAll (born 1966), Australian jazz musician and composer
- John McAll (born 1960), Australian musician
- Kate McAll, British radio director
- Robert Whitaker McAll (1821–1893), English Congregationalist minister

== See also ==
- McCall
