= Tom Jones (bishop) =

Anglican bishop in Australia (1903–1972)

Thomas Edward Jones (7 March 1903 – 16 May 1972) was an Anglican bishop in Australia.

Jones was educated at Ridley College. He was ordained in 1928 and began his ministry as a curate of Moreland and was then the priest in charge of Boggabilla until 1932. He then began a long period of service to the Bush Church Aid Society. In 1958 he was appointed the Bishop of Willochra, a post he held until 1969.

Anglican Communion titles
Preceded by Richard Thomas	Bishop of Willochra; 1958 –1969	Succeeded by Bruce Rosier
