= Bruce Rosier =

Australian bishop (1928–2019)

Stanley Bruce Rosier AM (18 November 1928 – 28 February 2019) was a bishop in the Anglican Church of Australia.

Rosier was educated at the University of Western Australia, and Christ Church, Oxford as a Rhodes Scholar. He trained for ordination at Westcott House, Cambridge and was ordained deacon in 1954 and priest in 1955 and began his ministry with a curacy at Ecclesall, after which he was the Rector of Wyalkatchem from 1957. He was then the Rector of Kellerberrin and, from 1967, an assistant bishop in the Diocese of Perth. In 1970 he was appointed Bishop of Willochra, a post he held until 1987. He was then the Rector of St Oswald's Parkside in Adelaide until his retirement in 1994. He died in hospital in Adelaide on 28 February 2019, and a Requiem Eucharist was held on Ash Wednesday at St Peter's Cathedral.

Anglican Communion titles
Preceded by Tom Jones	Bishop of Willochra; 1970–1987	Succeeded by David McCall
