= St John's Anglican Church, Albany =

Oldest consecrated church in Western Australia

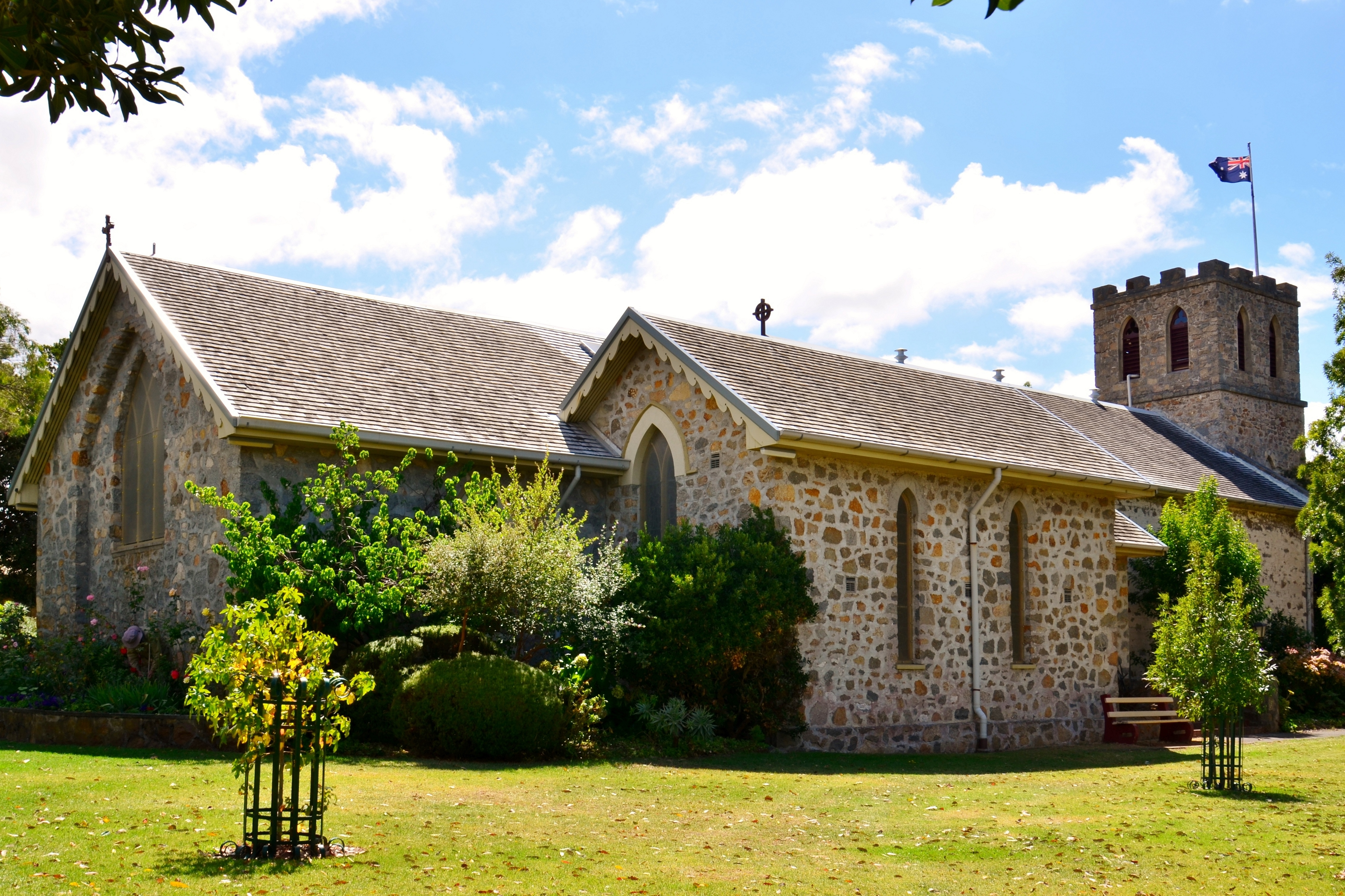
- The church in 2018
- St John's Anglican Church, Albany
- 35°01′32″S 117°53′0″E
- Location: York Street, Albany, Western Australia
- Country: Australia
- Denomination: Anglican
- Website: anglicanchurchalbany.org.au

History
- Status: Church
- Founded: 1841
- Dedication: St John the Evangelist
- Consecrated: 25 October 1848

Architecture
- Functional status: Active
- Years built: 1841–44

Specifications
- Materials: Stone, shingles

Administration
- Province: Western Australia
- Diocese: Bunbury
- Parish: Albany

Clergy
- Priest: Rev Karen Cave

Western Australia Heritage Register
- Official name: St John's Church
- Type: State Registered Place
- Designated: 9 February 1996
- Part of: St John's Church Group (3514)
- Reference no.: 71

St John's Anglican Church, also known as St John the Evangelist Anglican Church, is a heritage-listed Anglican church on York Street in Albany, Western Australia. The church is the oldest consecrated church in Western Australia, consecrated in October 1848.

== History ==
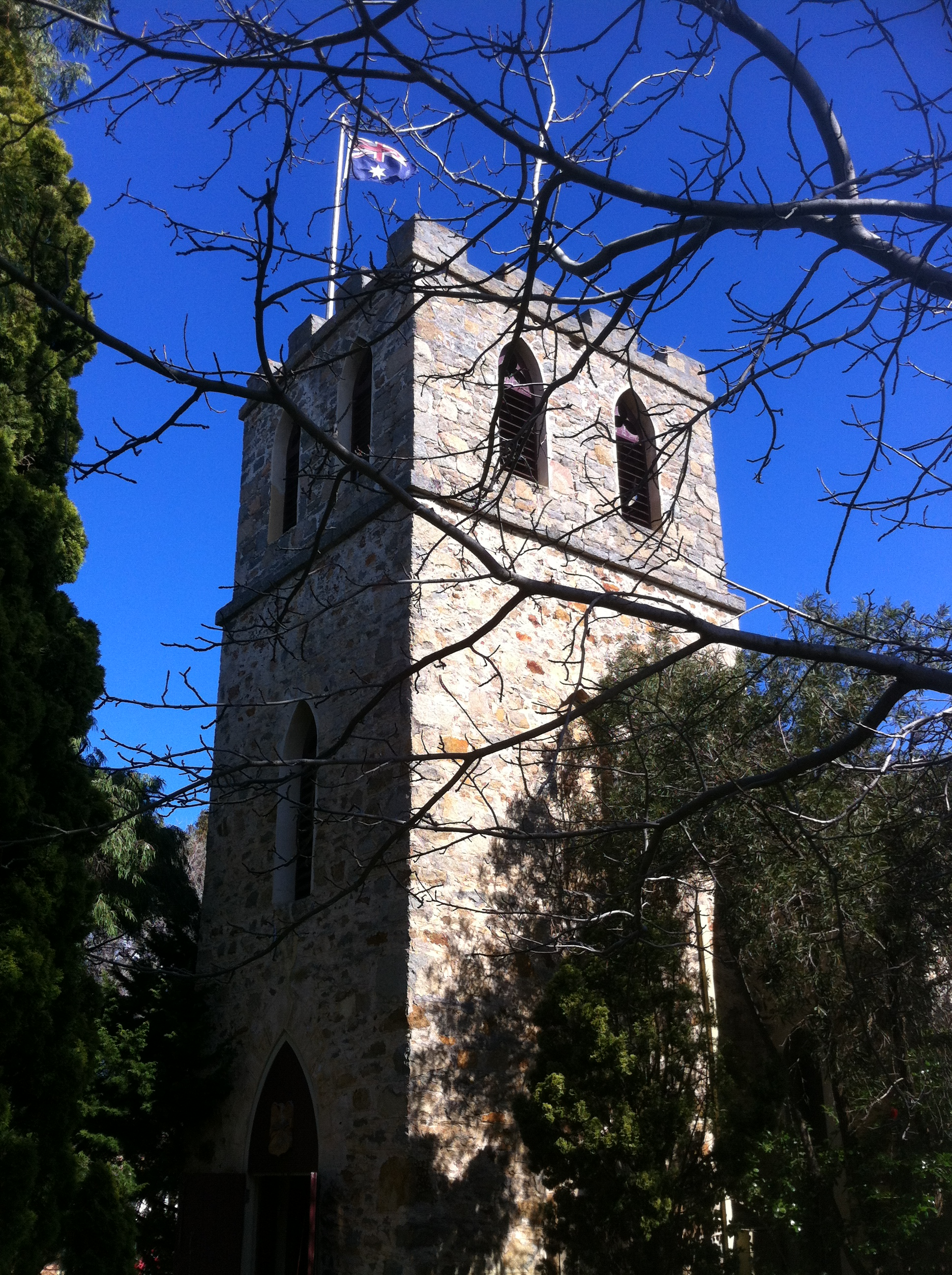
The tower in 2015

The church was built by the people of the town, with construction commencing in 1841 and completed in 1844. The church was consecrated on 25 October 1848 by Augustus Short, Bishop of Adelaide, who introduced John Ramsden Wollaston as its clergyman. At this time the church would have been able to accommodate the entire population of the town, 170 people.

Construction of the rectory commenced in 1850 and was completed the same year. Originally it was a single story stone building, however a second storey was added in 1875. A second rectory was built behind the original one in 1980.

The first recorded Anzac dawn service was held by the church in 1930.

The church, rectory, hall and peppermint trees were listed on the register of the National Trust in 1978.

From 1968 to 1979 Warwick Bastian was the coadjutor bishop of Bunbury, with the title Bishop of Albany. During that time, he based himself at St John's.

Canon Edward Argyl was appointed as the parish priest in 2011 until his death in 2015.

== Description ==
The church is a stone building with gabled roofs covered in shingles. The aisle of the church is made from 22-centimetre (9 in) thick blocks that had been made in England. The stone walls are 540 millimetres (21 in) thick and the building also has stone foundations; the stone was thought to be quarried from nearby Mount Melville and Mount Clarence. The walls are so thick that no buttresses are required. The original building is now the nave of the present church, with the gallery behind built in 1852. The tower and porch were completed in 1853. The tower is topped with battlements on the parapet.

== See also ==
- List of Anglican churches in Western Australia
- List of places on the State Register of Heritage Places in the City of Albany
