= Hamish Jamieson =

Australian retired Anglican bishop

Hamish Thomas Umphelby Jamieson was an Australian Anglican bishop.

== Early life ==
Hamish Jamieson was born on 15 February 1932 and educated at Sydney Church of England Grammar School, St Michael's House (Society of the Sacred Mission), Crafers, South Australia, and the University of New England (Australia).

== Religious life ==
Jamieson was ordained in 1956. He was a member of the Bush Brotherhood of the Good Shepherd from 1957 to 1962 when he became rector of Darwin, a post he held for five years. He was then a Royal Australian Navy chaplain until 1974 when he became the Bishop of Carpentaria (covering the north of Queensland and all of the Northern Territory) with his consecration as a bishop on 1 November at St John's Cathedral (Brisbane)).

A decade later he was translated to Bunbury, retiring in 2000.

== Death ==
Jamieson died on Monday 27 November 2023. The funeral was held at St Boniface Cathedral, Bunbury in Bunbury on 20 December 2023.

Anglican Communion titles
Preceded by Eric Hawkey	Bishop of Carpentaria; 1974–1984	Succeeded by Tony Hall-Matthews
Preceded by Stanley Goldsworthy	Bishop of Bunbury; 1984–2000	Succeeded by David McCall
