= Bishop of Bunbury =

Bishop of Bunbury may refer to:

- Anglican Bishop of Bunbury, part of the Province of Western Australia, Western Australia
- Bishop of Bunbury (Roman Catholic), in the Archdiocese of Perth, Western Australia
