= Ralph Hawkins =

Ralph Hawkins may refer to:

- Ralph Hawkins (American football) (1934–2004), former American football coach
- Ralph Hawkins (bishop) (1911–1987), Anglican Bishop of Bunbury, 1957–1977
