= Marion McCall =

Australian pilot

Marion Carmel McCall OAM (née le Breton) (born 1943) is an Australian pilot, notable for winning the international Dawn-to-Dusk Flying Competition, the first Australian woman to do so, and the first Australian to win the competition three times.

== Background ==
Born in 1943 in Mornington, Victoria, McCall studied teaching at Melbourne Teachers’ College and the Melbourne Conservatorium of Music at Melbourne University. Following graduation, she taught singing for two years with the Victorian Education Department Board. McCall was poised to take up a position as an announcer with ABC Radio in Melbourne but through her association with Wangaratta Cathedral, McCall met, and married in 1969, the bishop’s son, David McCall. They had five children together.

McCall has published several books of poetry and short stories, including Nullarbor West, a compilation of poems inspired by her life in Western Australia, where she lived between 2000 and 2010 while her husband served as Bishop of the Anglican Diocese of Bunbury.

On her husband’s retirement in 2010 they returned to Adelaide, where they had lived prior to their posting to Bunbury and before that the Anglican Diocese of Willochra. She remains an active member of the Anglican Church, currently serving as the Diocesan President of the Mothers' Union of the Anglican Diocese of Adelaide, and as President of Australian Church Women from 2012 to 2014.

== Aviation ==
At 48, McCall decided to learn to fly in order to help her husband reduce the amount of time he spent travelling across a diocese that takes in over 90 percent of the state. The cost of a pilot’s license was paid by the ‘Wings over Willochra’ campaign, in which each parishioner bought a $10 “share” in McCall. After seven months of training, at the end of 1992, she was issued her licence.

In 2004, to celebrate the Bunbury Diocese turning 100, McCall entered the Dawn to Dusk Challenge, an international perpetual flying contest established in 1964 by HRH Prince Philip. Flying her single engine Cessna 172, McCall (accompanied by her husband as navigator) won, becoming the first Australian woman, and fourth woman overall, to win in the contest’s 40-year history. McCall was also awarded the Tiger Medal for the longest distance flown in a day: 12 hours and 48 minutes, involving 10 stops, and only three minutes behind schedule. She went on to win the Duke of Edinburgh Cup again in 2007 and 2012/2013, the Half Dawn to Dusk once, and the Tiger Medal a second time.

McCall is a member of the Australian Women Pilots’ Association, which was founded by pioneering Australian aviator Nancy Bird Walton. McCall donated a scholarship in her name to the Australian Women's Pilots Association to financially assist Aboriginal/Torres Strait Islander women to train as pilots.

== Honours ==
In 2011 McCall was awarded an OAM for service to aviation and the Australian Women Pilots’ Association, and the Nancy Bird Trophy for the most noteworthy contribution to aviation by a woman in Australasia. In 2019 she was included in the South Australian Women's Honour Roll.

== In the media ==
McCall and her husband featured in a 1997 episode of the ABC Television program Australian Story, titled 'A Wing and a Prayer'.

McCall's piloting adventures form the subject of a chapter in Kathy Mexted’s 2020 book, Australian Women Pilots: Amazing true stories of women in the air.
