= Alfred Deakin High School =

Location
- Deakin, Australian Capital Territory; Australia; 35.324°S 149.095°E

Information
- Motto: Care and Quality
- Established: 1989
- Key people: Brian Downton (Principal)
- Grades: 7–10
- Enrollment: Approx. 960
- Website: http://www.adhs.act.edu.au

Alfred Deakin High School is a government secondary school in Deakin, Australian Capital Territory, covering years 7 to 10 in the Territory's education system. It is named after the second Australian Prime Minister, Alfred Deakin.

== History ==
Two separate schools in the area, Deakin High School in Deakin and Woden Valley High School in Mawson, opened on 2 February 1966 and 1 February 1968 for $1.1 million respectively. In 1989, the two were amalgamated on the Deakin site and the name Alfred Deakin High School was chosen.

Since 1989 the school building has undergone considerable refurbishment, including the acquisition of modern kitchens and technology, including information technology and photography areas. During 1991 the school gymnasium was completed at a cost of AU$1.8 million and officially opened on 26 July 1991 by Bill Wood. In more recent times special purpose rooms for dance and drama, computing, multi-media and problem solving in mathematics have been added. In early 1999 major refurbishments were completed in the science area and similar improvements to teaching spaces in Technology were completed in 2000. During 2007 and 2009 the school undertook upgrades which included new toilets, new carpeting and an update to the gym. The upgrades were part of the Rudd government's Education revolution. The school is a "bring your own device" school and was one of the public schools in the ACT to embrace Google Apps for Education. On 9 June 2017, Yvette Berry, the ACT Education minister opened a refurbished kitchen. In September 2020, it was reported that the school had dealt with lead paint contamination and it was discovered in August 2020 during construction work on the school hall, becoming the third school in the ACT to do so since the July school holidays.

== Weekend education ==
The Canberra Japanese Supplementary School Inc., a Japanese weekend educational programme, holds its classes at Alfred Deakin High, while the school offices are in Yarralumla. It was established on 1 August 1988.

The ACT German Language School also holds classes at Alfred Deakin High on Saturday mornings from 9:00am until 11:30am.

== Notable alumni ==
- Perin Davey, politician
- Ezra Getzler, mathematician
- Sue Geh, women's basketball player
- Liv Hewson, actor
- Michael O'Connor, rugby union and rugby league international
- John Stead, Anglican bishop

== See also ==
- List of schools in the Australian Capital Territory
