= Julius Lewis =

Australian priest

Julius Lewis was an Anglican priest in the last decades of the 19th century and the first two of the 20th in Australia.

Ordained in 1884 he began his career with curacies at Hamilton, Victoria, and Portland. In 1881, he became vicar of Maryborough then archdeacon of Tamworth, New South Wales, and then Armidale. His final appointment was as Dean of Ballarat in 1914, a post he held until his death in 1920.
