= Stanley Goldsworthy =

Arthur Stanley Goldsworthy (18 February 1926 – 16 November 2014) was an Australian Anglican bishop. He was the sixth Bishop of Bunbury in the Anglican Church of Australia from 1977 to 1983.

Goldsworthy was educated at Dandenong High School and St Columb's Hall, Wangaratta. He was ordained in 1952. His first position was a curacy in Wodonga, after which he was priest in charge of Bethanga. He then held incumbencies at Chiltern, Kensington, Melbourne and Yarrawonga. He was appointed as Archdeacon of Shepparton and then of Wangaratta before his ordination to the episcopate. After retirement from the see, he held incumbencies in Hendra, Gilgandra and Meningie (Diocese of The Murray) before retirement from ministry in 1992. He died in McLaren Vale on 16 November 2014 and was buried in the churchyard of St Philip & St James' Church, Old Noarlunga.

Anglican Communion titles
Preceded by Ralph Hawkins	Bishop of Bunbury; 1977-1983	Succeeded by Hamish Jamieson
