= William Johnson (bishop) =

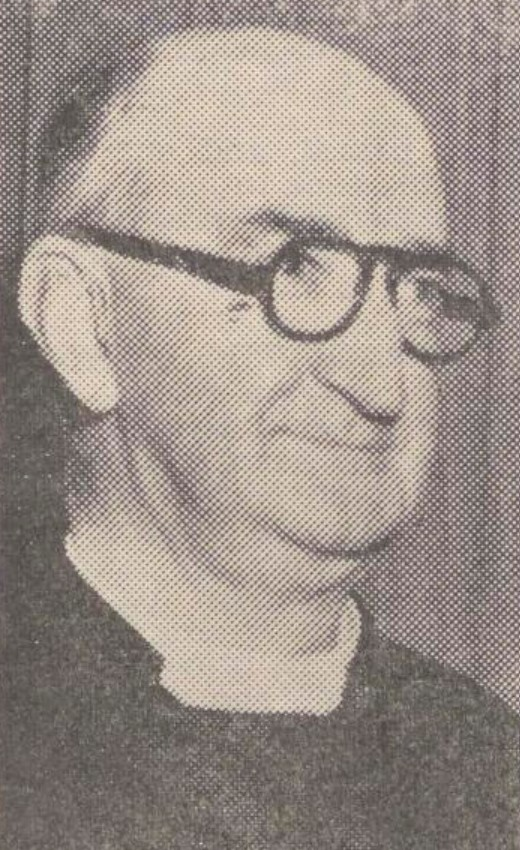

William Herbert Johnson (12 May 1889–15 July 1960) was the 5th Anglican Bishop of Ballarat in Australia.

Johnson was born in Brighton, South Australia, on 12 May 1889. He was educated at St Peter's College, Adelaide, the University of Adelaide and St John's Theological College, Melbourne. He was ordained in 1914 and his first ministry position was as a curate at Holy Trinity, Kew, in Melbourne. After World War I service as a chaplain to the AIF he was the rector of St Cuthbert's Prospect, South Australia, where he remained until his appointment as the Dean of Newcastle. In 1936 he was ordained to the episcopate and was in post at his death on 15 July 1960.

Anglican Communion titles
Preceded by Philip Charles Thurlow Crick	Bishop of Ballarat; 1936–1960	Succeeded by William Hardie
