= Richard Thomas (bishop) =

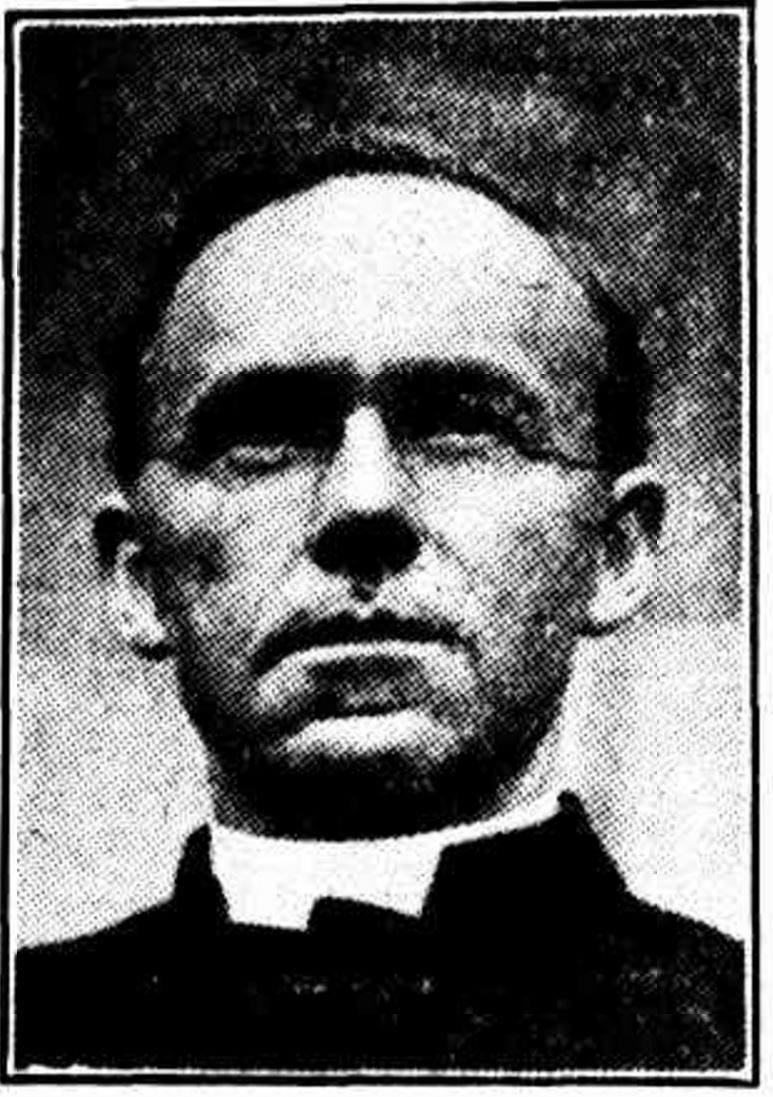
Richard Thomas, Anglican Bishop of Willochra, 1926

Richard Thomas (1880–1958) was an Anglican priest in Australia. He was the second Bishop of Willochra.

== Early life ==
Thomas was born on 24 October 1880 at Lydney, Gloucestershire, England, the son of railway clerk Daniel Thomas, and his wife Jane, (née Griffiths). He was educated at Monmouth Grammar School.

== Religious life ==
Thomas was ordained in 1909. He began his career with a curacy at St John Baptist, Coventry after which he emigrated to Australia to become a Bush Brother. From 1923 to 1925 he was Archdeacon of North Queensland before his ordination to the episcopate of Willochra.

== Later life ==
On 16 April 1958, while in England to attend the Lambeth Conference, Thomas died at Grays Thurrock, Essex. He was buried at Cowbridge, Glamorgan, Wales.

Anglican Communion titles
Preceded by Gilbert White	Bishop of Willochra; 1926–1958	Succeeded by Tom Jones
