= John Stead (bishop) =

Australian-English Anglican bishop (born 1956)

The Right Reverend John Stead
- Bishop of Willochra
- Church: Anglican Church of Australia
- Diocese: Willochra
- Installed: 30 June 2012
- Term ended: 2 July 2022
- Predecessor: Garry Weatherill
- Other posts: Assistant Bishop, Diocese of Bathurst (2009–2012)

Orders
- Ordination: 1995 (deacon); 1996 (priest)
- Consecration: 29 August 2009

Personal details
- Born: 11 March 1956 (age 70) Bexleyheath, Kent, England
- Denomination: Anglican
- Spouse: Jan
- Children: 2 sons
- Education: St Mark's National Theological Centre

John Stead (born 11 March 1956) is an Australian-English Anglican bishop who served as the Bishop of Willochra from 30 June 2012 to 2 July 2022.

== Career ==
English born, he grew up in Canberra, attending Deakin High School. He received a Bachelor of Education from the University of Canberra in 1979 and worked as a school teacher. In 1996, he was awarded a Bachelor's degree in Theology from the Sydney College of Divinity and was made a deacon in 1995 and a priest the following year. He was awarded a Master of Ministry from the School of Theology at Charles Sturt University in 2022 with a focus on Pastoral (Professional) Supervision.

Stead served as a priest in the Diocese of Canberra and Goulburn and was collated as an Archdeacon and installed as Rector of the Parish of St John's Wagga Wagga in 2004. In 2009 he was consecrated Assistant bishop of the Diocese of Bathurst and was based in Dubbo, and in 2012 was enthroned as Bishop of Willochra. He retired as Bishop on 2 July 2022. Stead then became a locum at All Saints, Ainslie.

== Personal life ==
Stead is married to Jan and they have two adult sons.

Anglican Communion titles
Preceded by Garry Weatherill	Bishop of Willochra; 2012–2022	Succeeded by Jeremy James
