= Allan Ewing =

The Right Reverend Allan Ewing
- Bishop of Bunbury
- Church: Anglican Church of Australia
- Diocese: Bunbury (2010–2017)
- In office: 10 July 2010 to 2017
- Predecessor: David McCall
- Successor: Ian Coutts
- Other posts: Assistant bishop, Diocese of Canberra & Goulburn (2004–2009)

Orders
- Ordination: 1988 (as priest)
- Consecration: 2 February 2004

Personal details
- Born: 1951 (age 74–75) England
- Denomination: Anglican
- Spouse: Tricia
- Children: 2
- Education: St Mark's National Theological Centre

Allan Bowers Ewing (born 1951) is a retired Australian Anglican bishop who served as the Anglican Bishop of Bunbury from 2010 to 2017, and prior to that as an assistant bishop in the Anglican Diocese of Canberra and Goulburn from 2004 to 2009.

Born in England in 1951, he was formerly an accountant. He was ordained as deacon in the Diocese of Canberra and Goulburn in 1987 and priest the following year. Ewing served in Holbrook, and Batemans Bay prior to becoming Archdeacon of North Canberra and Rector of St John's Canberra. On 2 February 2004 he was consecrated as Assistant bishop in the Diocese of Canberra and Goulburn, and was based in Wagga Wagga. He was enthroned as the ninth Bishop of Bunbury in the Cathedral Church of St Boniface on 10 July 2010.

Anglican Communion titles
Preceded by David McCall	Bishop of Bunbury; 2010–2017	Succeeded by Ian Coutts
