= Donald Redding =

Donald Llewellyn Redding, MBE was the fourth Anglican Bishop of Bunbury from 1951 to 1957.

Redding was born on 11 July 1898 and educated at the City of London School and St Barnabas' Theological College, North Adelaide. He was ordained in 1922.

His first post was a curacy at Christ Church, Mount Gambier after which he was Priest in Charge of St Peter's Church, Robe. He later held incumbencies at St John's Church, Maitland, St Mary's Church, Burra and St Barnabas' Church, Clare before returning as an archdeacon.

In 1949, Redding became Vicar of St Andrew's Church, Brighton before being ordained to the episcopate. After this he was vicar of St Mary's Church, South Camberwell and then finally a Coadjutor Bishop in the Anglican Diocese of Melbourne.

Redding died on 15 October 1969.

Anglican Communion titles
Preceded by Leslie Knight	Bishop of Bunbury; 1951-1957	Succeeded by Ralph Hawkins
