= List of State Register of Heritage Places in the City of Bunbury =

The State Register of Heritage Places is maintained by the Heritage Council of Western Australia. As of 2026, 358 places are heritage-listed in the City of Bunbury, of which 46 are on the State Register of Heritage Places.

== List ==
The Western Australian State Register of Heritage Places, as of 2026, lists the following 46 state registered places within the City of Bunbury:

Place name	Place #	Street number	Street name	Suburb or town	Co-ordinates	Notes & former names	Photo
Paisley Centre	330	1	Arthur Street	Bunbury	33.326408°S 115.639470°E	Bunbury Arts Gallery / Art Centre, Bunbury Boys School (former)	
Bunbury Railway Station (former)	331	2	Camody Place	Bunbury	33.32427°S 115.63849°E	Station & Bus Terminal, Tourist Bureau, The Old Station, Bunbury Railway	
Myrniong	332	50	Beach Road	Bunbury	33.336185°S 115.632426°E	Myrniong House	
King Cottage	339	77	Forrest Avenue	Bunbury	33.341281°S 115.649000°E	Lamorna, Local History Museum	
Leschenault Homestead	344	Lot 963	Estuary Drive	Vittoria	33.329689°S 115.668931°E	Heritage roses, Trees: Olives, Camphor laurel, Oaks	
Catholic Cathedral Precinct, Bunbury	345	Lot 300	Money Street	Bunbury	33.328947°S 115.637092°E	St Patrick's Church, Presbytery	
St Patrick's Anglican Church (former) & War Memorial, Rathmines	348	74	Austral Parade	East Bunbury	33.331816°S 115.661398°E	Church of Christ, Greek Orthodox Church Services	
Bunbury Court House site & current Court House	352	3	Stephen Street	Bunbury	33.326329°S 115.637339°E		
Bunbury Municipal Offices (former)	353	3	Stephen Street	Bunbury	33.326686°S 115.636022°E	Bunbury Court House	
Prince of Wales Hotel	354	41	Stephen Street	Bunbury	33.326433°S 115.638453°E		
The Residency, Bunbury	355	55	Stirling Street	Bunbury	33.327447°S 115.643353°E		
House at 84 Stirling Street	359	84	Stirling Street	Bunbury	33.326850°S 115.646611°E		
House at 10 Turner Street	366	10	Turner Street	Bunbury	33.328111°S 115.635781°E		
Grand Central Hotel	369	83	Victoria Street	Bunbury	33.323705°S 115.636616°E	Moreton Bay Fig Tree	
Solicitor's Rooms (former), Bunbury	370	99	Victoria Street	Bunbury	33.324098°S 115.636623°E	Apex/Lotteries House, Citizens Advice Bureau, Stanley, Money & Walker Solicitors Office	
WA Bank (former), Bunbury	371	101	Victoria Street	Bunbury	33.324219°S 115.636631°E	Bank of New South Wales (NSW), Lotteries House, Bunbury District Employment Office	
Lyric Theatre (former)	374	73–77	Victoria Street	Bunbury	33.323415°S 115.636679°E	Goldfields Theatre, Webster's Dance Hall, Bill Brown's Furniture Store	
Cronshaw's Store	375	103–107	Victoria Street	Bunbury	33.324550°S 115.636600°E	Smith's Buildings, Smith's Drapery	
Rose Hotel & Sample Room, Bunbury	376	27 & 29	Wellington Street	Bunbury	33.324477°S 115.637836°E	Rose Hotel	
Bunbury Post Office & Bonded Store (former)	378	Lot 500	Stephen Street	Bunbury	33.326402°S 115.635800°E	Police Office, Bunbury Court House Annexe, SES, Post & Telegraph Office, Police Qtrs, Regional	
Convent of Mercy Group (former)	379	68	Wittenoom Street	Bunbury	33.324974°S 115.635184°E	Convent of Mercy & School St Patricks Convent, Bunbury Regional Art Gallery Sacred Heart HS	
Masonic Hall, Bunbury	380	74	Wittenoom Street	Bunbury	33.325789°S 115.635323°E	Freemasons Hall, Wellington Lodge	
Forrest Homestead	381	Lot 91	South Western Highway	Picton – now Wollaston	33.353073°S 115.684602°E	Olive Trees & Mill Farm, The Old Place	
Picton Inn Hotel	382		Kaeshagen Street off Vittoria Road	Picton – now Wollaston	33.349161°S 115.676478°E	Lawrence's Wayside Inn, Morgan's Inn, Morgan's Wayside Inn, Old Picto	
St Mark's Anglican Church	383		Charterhouse Road	Picton – now Wollaston	33.344436°S 115.666535°E	St. Mark's Anglican Church & former Graveyard, Old Picton Church, St Mark the Evangelist	
Post Box, Kings Cottage	2535	77	Forrest Avenue	Bunbury	33.341448°S 115.648986°E	Letter Receiver VR 1897	
Boarding House (former)	2921	155–159	Stirling Street	Bunbury	33.328179°S 115.653191°E	Three Dwellings	
CBH Grain Silos (former), Bunbury	2999		The Strand / Ommanney Street	Bunbury	33.319164°S 115.638915°E	Co-operative Bulk Handling Silos	
Clifton Residence, Rathmines	3285	9	Shenton Street	Rathmines, Bunbury	33.332105°S 115.661692°E	Leston	
Bunbury Timber Jetty	3402	Lot 1036	Jetty Road	Bunbury	33.309902°S 115.643597°E	Outer Harbour Jetty, demolished in 2012	
Bunbury Council Chambers	3642	2	Stephen Street	Bunbury	33.325915°S 115.636006°E	Mayoral Suite & Function Room, Bunbury Municipal Chambers	
Moreton Bay Fig Tree & Charterhouse site	4353		Charterhouse Street	Picton – now Wollaston	33.344837°S 115.667287°E	Various remnant vegetation	
Commonwealth Bank (former), Bunbury	4575	149	Victoria Street	Bunbury	33.32427°S 115.63849°E	Telecom Building, Parliamentary Party Offices	
Bunbury Senior High School	5613	10	Haig Crescent	Bunbury	33.326361°S 115.636661°E	Bunbury High School	
St Boniface Anglican Cathedral	5667	29–33	Parkfield Street	Bunbury	33.331468°S 115.637859°E	Calvary Wayside Shrine & Memorial Lawn	
Forrest's Leschenault Water Mill & Mill Race – Site	5676		South Western Highway on Preston River	Picton	33.352416°S 115.683818°E		
Lady Mitchell Memorial Child Health Centre, Bunbury	5682	2	Prosser Street	Bunbury	33.337921°S 115.640790°E	Lady Mitchell Memorial Infant Health Centre, Bunbury Child Health Centre	
Anzac Park, Bunbury	5700	Corner	Stirling & Parkfield Streets	Bunbury	33.327369°S 115.637031°E	Garden of Peace, Bunbury War Memorial & Anzac Park	
Red Mill Store	5710	59–61	Stirling Street	Bunbury	33.327424°S 115.643969°E	Edward Crossley's Ironmongery & Builders' Supply, Chadd & Whitty's Store	
Rose Hotel Bottle Shop & Sample Room	5739	31	Wellington Street	Bunbury	33.324477°S 115.637836°E		
Bunbury Women's Club	7166	19	Prinsep Street	Bunbury	33.325468°S 115.638054°E	Anglican Deanery (former), Anglican Rectory (former)	
St Patrick's Roman Catholic Cathedral	18392	18	Parkfield Street	Bunbury	33.328933°S 115.637045°E	Original building severely damaged and demolished in 2005	
St Patrick's Roman Catholic Parish House	18393			Bunbury	^{[?]}	Original building severely damaged and demolished in 2005	
War Memorial	18397			Bunbury	^{[?]}	part of St Patrick's Anglican Church (former) & War Memorial, Rathmines (348)	
Bishopscourt	18565	15	Cross Street	Bunbury	33.332169°S 115.638331°E		
St Boniface Anglican Cathedral & Bishopscourt	18566	31 & 33	Parkfield Street	Bunbury	33.331468°S 115.637859°E		

=== Notes ===
- ^[?]No coordinates specified by Inherit database
