= William Hardie (bishop of Ballarat) =

Australian clergyman (1904–1980)

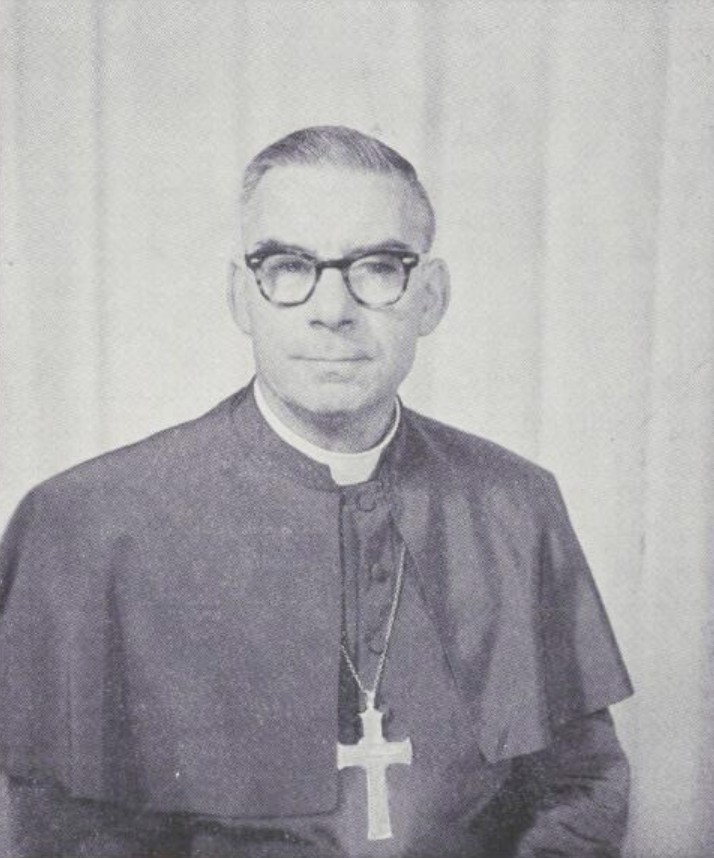
William Auchterlonie Hardie

William Auchterlonie Hardie was the sixth Anglican Bishop of Ballarat from 1961 to 1975.

Hardie was born on 14 October 1904. He was educated at the University of Queensland and ordained in 1931. Hardie married Katherine Elizabeth ("Betty") Weeks, daughter of William Charles and Alice Maude Weeks, at Holy Trinity Church, Fortitude Valley, Brisbane, on 18 June 1932. His first ministry position was as a curate at Holy Trinity, Fortitude Valley, Brisbane, after which he was chaplain at the Southport School before becoming the rector of Holy Trinity, Woolloongabba, Queensland. He was then appointed Warden of St John's College, Brisbane, after which he was Archdeacon of Moreton and then Dean of Newcastle where he remained until being appointed to the episcopate. He was consecrated a bishop on 2 February 1961 at St Paul's Cathedral, Melbourne. He died on 31 January 1980.

Anglican Communion titles
| Preceded by William Johnson | Bishop of Ballarat; 1961 – 1975 | Succeeded by John Hazlewood |
