= William Tucker (priest) =

Anglican priest (1856 – 1934)

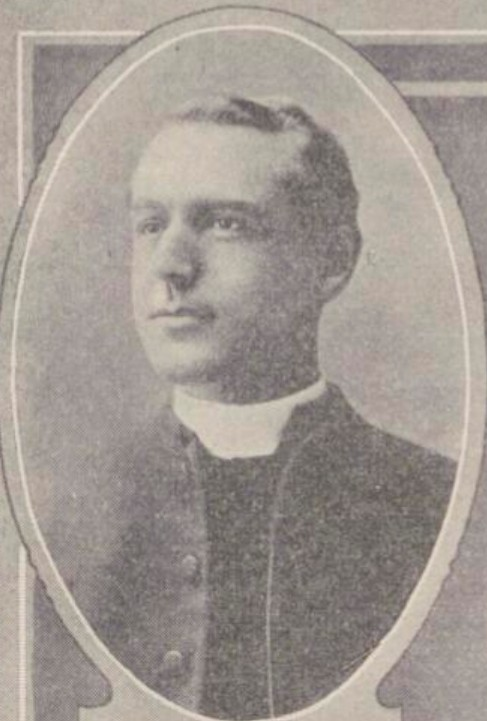

William Frederic Tucker (3 January 1856 – 15 October 1934) was an Anglican priest in the last decades of the 19th century and the first part of the 20th century.

Tucker was born in New Cross and educated at St John's College, Cambridge. He was ordained in 1881 and became the vicar of Townsville in 1887 and then Archdeacon of Ballarat in 1898 before becoming the Dean of Ballarat in 1921. He served on the Council of Trinity College (University of Melbourne) from 1919.
