= Bunbury Women's Club =

Historic property in Bunbury, Western Australia

- Motto with a spade and the Chinese character for "west", representing bridge and mahjong

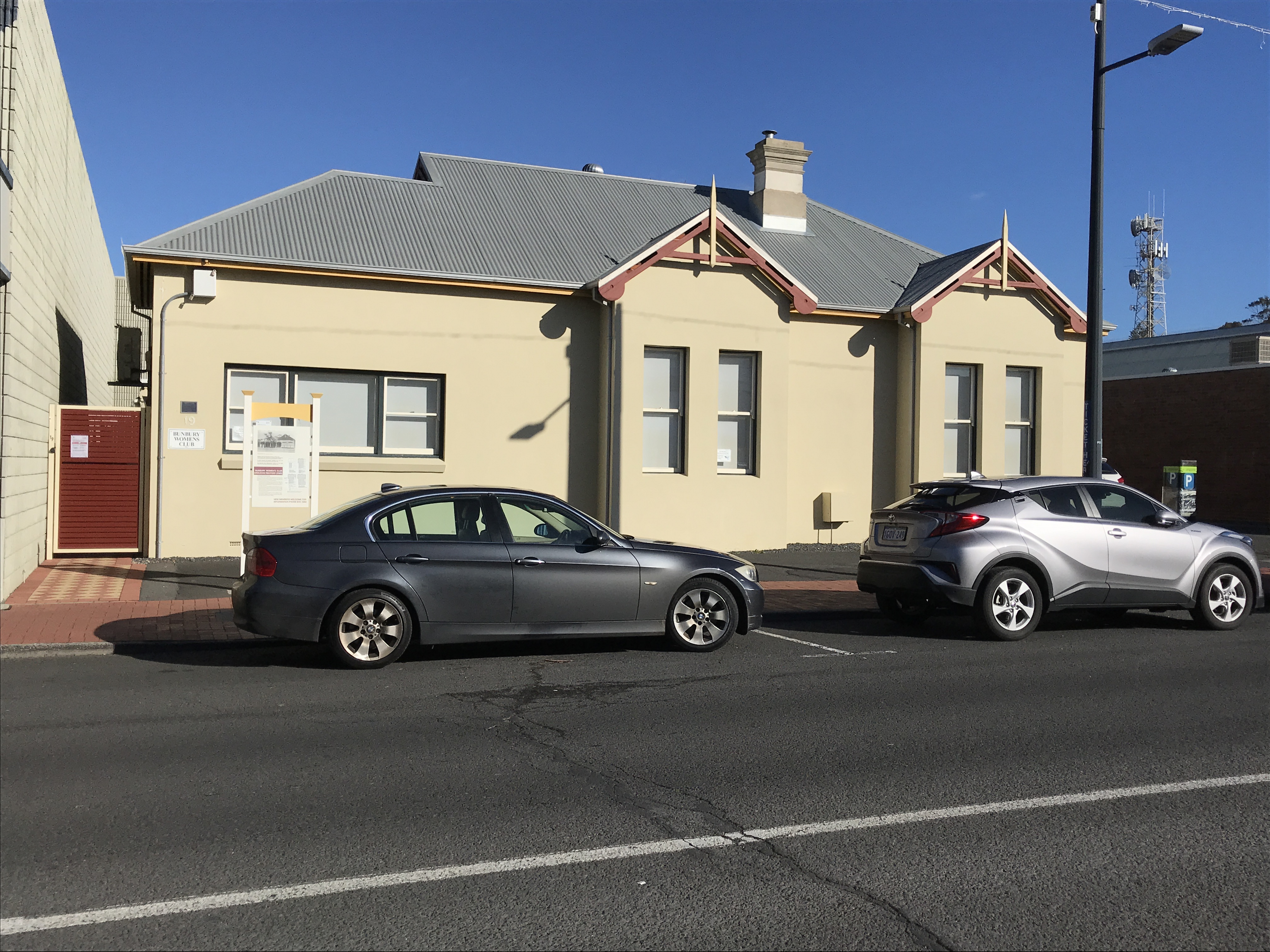
- The clubhouse next to Stirling Centre in 2022

- Location within Western Australia
- Abbreviation: BWC
- Formation: 1955
- Location: 19 Prinsep Street, Bunbury, Western Australia 6230, Australia
- Coordinates: 33°19′32″S 115°38′17″E
- Region served: Greater Bunbury
- Website: Facebook page
- Formerly called: Anglican Rectory, Anglican Deanery

Western Australia Heritage Register
- Designated: 12 October 2012 (Interim); 15 January 2013 (Permanent)
- Reference no.: 07166
- Built: 1853, 1889, 1910
- Architect: Eustace Cohen (1910)
- Architectural style: Federation Arts and Crafts

The Bunbury Women's Club occupies a former Anglican building in Bunbury, Western Australia. The State Register of Heritage Places lists the historic women's club.

== History ==
The Anglican church built a rectory on the site in 1853. In 1889, the church converted that building to a deanery. After serving as a chaplain to 300 convicts, Reverend Joseph Winters lived in the residence as he served as the chaplain in Bunbury from 1864 to 1889 and again from 1889 to 1893. He is credited with initiating the fundraising and building of St Paul's Anglican Church on nearby Victoria Street. As the area continued to grow, the church established the Anglican Diocese of Bunbury in 1904 and significantly expanded the building in 1910. The church decided to sell the structure in 1954 due to water damage.

The Bunbury Women's Club began in 1955, led by a female relative of Reverend Withers. While the group originally rented the former rectory, they purchased the building in 1957 for £A 5,250, equivalent to A$186,290 in 2022. The organisation originally limited membership to 250, which created a waitlist, and focused on crafts, concerts, and cocktail parties. Today, the club is open to all interested women and emphasises recreation, especially playing bridge and mahjong games.

Western Australia's State Register of Heritage Places listed the building on an interim basis in 2012, which became permanent the following year. Lotterywest then began funding conservation work on the structure. In 2016, the building began plans to join the Bunbury's Heritage Trail, part of the Western Australian Heritage Trails Network.

== Architecture ==
The Federation Arts and Crafts style building consists of the original 1853 rectory which prominent Perth architect Eustace Cohen substantially expanded and redesigned in 1910. Cohen, in partnership with Joseph Eales, was responsible for the design of many ecclesiastical buildings in Western Australia.

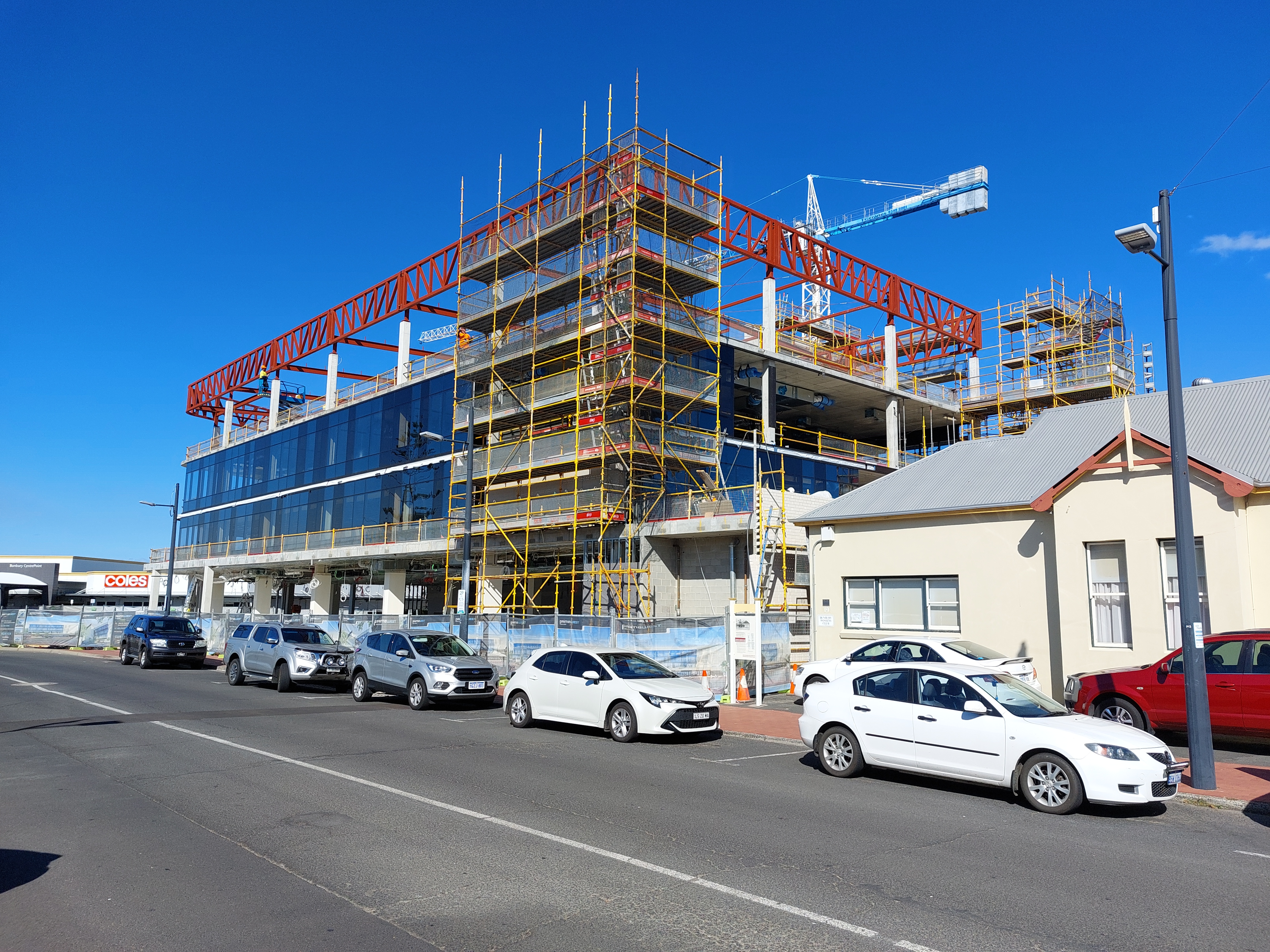
Construction of adjacent Bunbury Service Centre in 2022

The clubhouse is one storey painted rendered brick building with a corrugated iron roof. The asymmetrical facade contains two prominent gables above two projecting bays, each with twin double hung sash windows. The interior contains a number of details original to the 1910 expansion. These include timber bay windows, timber doors, and lath and plaster ceilings with roses.

While the building provides continuity, the architectural context shifted dramatically with the growth of the city centre. The domestic scale of the clubhouse originally matched the residential character of area but the building now sits within a very dense central business district in the City of Bunbury. In 1972, after the women declined an offer of $45,000, equivalent to A$521,000 in 2022, to sell the building, Boan's Department Store built the Stirling Centre immediately next door. In 2022, a four-storey government office building for Services Australia replaced the shopping centre, but was set back further from the women's club to improve visibility.

== See also ==
- Karrakatta Club, Perth
- List of State Register of Heritage Places in the City of Bunbury
