= David McCall (bishop) =

Australian Anglican prelate (1940–2021)

The Right Reverend David McCall
- Bishop of Bunbury; Bishop of Willochra
- Church: Anglican Church of Australia
- Province: Province of Western Australia (2000 to 2010); Province of South Australia (1987 to 2000)
- Diocese: Bunbury (2000 to 2010); Willochra (1987 to 2000)
- In office: 2000 to 2010 (Bunbury); 1987 to 2000 (Willochra)
- Predecessor: Hamish Jamieson (Bunbury); Bruce Rosier (Willochra)
- Successor: Allan Ewing (Bunbury); Garry Weatherill (Willochra)

Orders
- Ordination: 1963 (as priest)
- Consecration: 1 November 1987

Personal details
- Born: William David Hair McCall; 29 February 1940 Australia
- Died: 7 May 2021 (aged 81) Adelaide
- Denomination: Anglicanism
- Parents: Theodore McCall (father)
- Spouse: Marion Carmel McCall

William David Hair McCall (29 February 1940 - 7 May 2021) was an Australian Anglican bishop.

McCall was born into a prominent family. His grandfather was John McCall, Agent-General for Tasmania, and his father, Theodore Bruce McCall, an Anglican bishop. He was educated at Launceston Church Grammar School, Sydney Grammar School. He studied for the priesthood at St Michael's House in Crafers, South Australia and was ordained in 1963.

He served curacies at St Alban's Griffith and St Peter's Broken Hill. He was then priest-in-charge of Barellan-Weethalle, Rector of St John's Corowa and (his last post before ordination to the episcopate) the incumbent of St George's, Goodwood. On 1 November 1987, he was consecrated a bishop, and served as Bishop of Willochra until in 2000 he was translated to the Diocese of Bunbury.

== Ordination of women ==
When he was a priest in the Adelaide diocese (1978-1987), McCall opposed the ordination of women to the priesthood and then as the new Bishop of Willochra he signed the 1988 Ash Wednesday declaration, a statement made at the Lambeth bishops' conference rejecting the ordination of women as bishops, priests and deacons. He said later that he supported the ordination of women as deacons only. He did not see the ordination of women as priests as a matter of faith but wanted it to be a decision of the whole church. He gradually came to accept and support the ordination of women through a number of events over the years. He was shocked at what he called the heretical statement of a fellow priest that God was male and therefore priests must be male.

McCall wrote "There is an appropriate balance of gender with the God-bearer being a woman (that was the only possibility) and the incarnate God being male. Both male and female are thus honoured by God and both genders play an essential role in the work of salvation. But the heart of the incarnation was not that Jesus was male, but that he was human." He said that on reflection he decided that "The only ground for ordination is that a person is called by God."

When the synod of the Diocese of Willochra voted to ordain women, McCall found himself in agreement and began to ordain women as priests. In 1997 he ordained Letitia "Letty" Allen and Doris Erica "Sal" Tatchell in 1999 and appointed Lesley "Yvonne" McLean (made priest in Melbourne) as District Priest for Eyre. Later, as Bishop of Bunbury in 2001 at the 12th General Synod of the Anglican Church of Australia, he seconded the motion of Muriel Porter to put a bill to the synod removing all the legal obstacles to the consecration of women to the episcopate (women bishops).

== Personal life ==
He was married to Marion Carmel McCall, who is a pilot; their eldest son, Theo D. McCall (also a priest), is chaplain of St Peter's College, Adelaide, and an adjunct lecturer at St Barnabas' College and Charles Sturt University.

McCall died in 2021, aged 81.

Anglican Communion titles
Preceded by Bruce Rosier	Bishop of Willochra; 1987–2000	Succeeded by Garry Weatherill
Preceded by Hamish Jamieson	Bishop of Bunbury; 2000–2010	Succeeded by Allan Ewing
