= Jeremy James (bishop) =

The Right Reverend Jeremy James tssf
- Bishop of Willochra
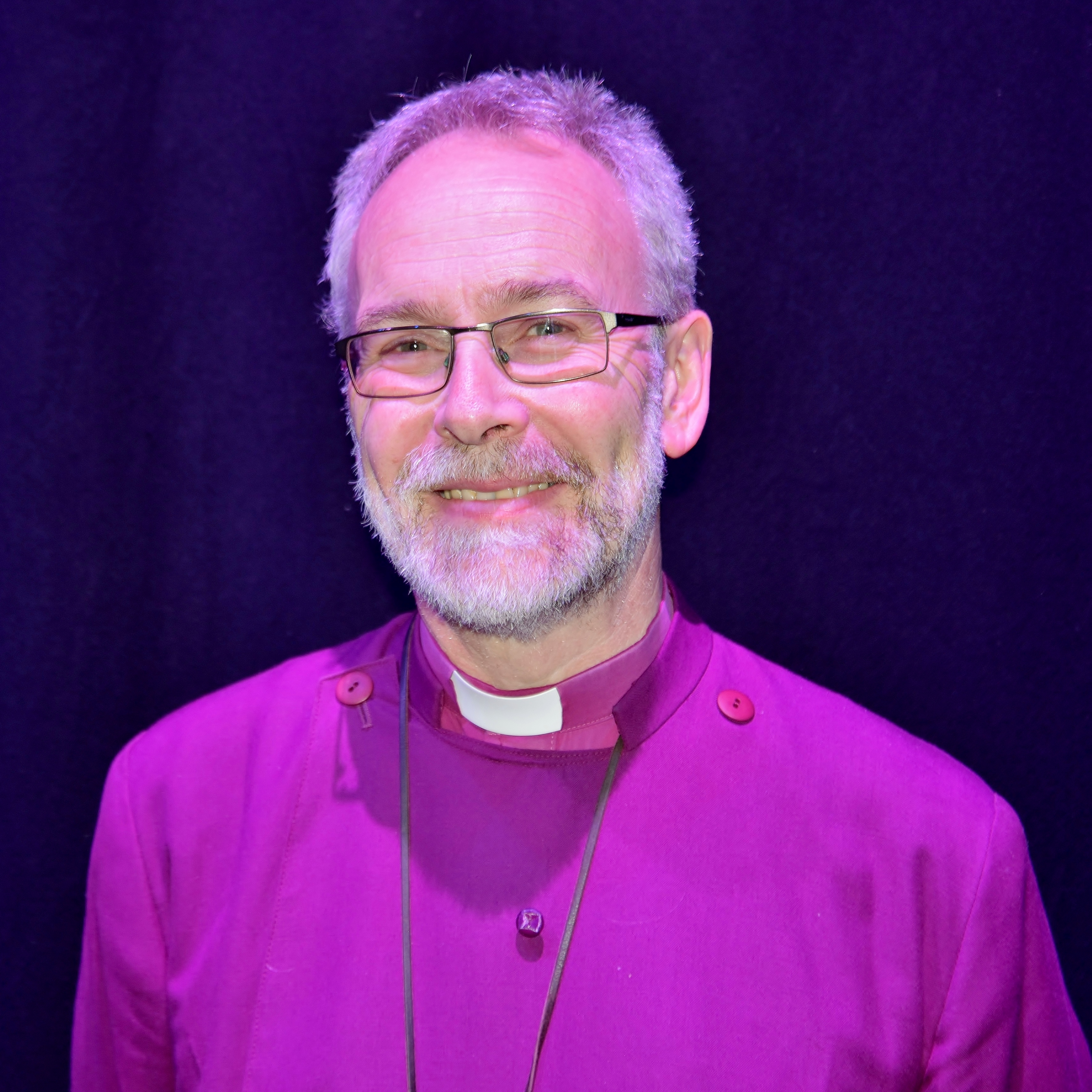
- James in 2019
- Church: Anglican Church of Australia
- Diocese: Diocese of Willochra
- In office: 25 February 2023 – present
- Predecessor: John Stead
- Other post: Assistant Bishop of Perth (2014–2022)

Orders
- Consecration: 6 August 2014

Personal details
- Born: Sidmouth, Dorset, United Kingdom
- Denomination: Anglicanism
- Spouse: Lynne (died 2020)

Jeremy Noel Robert James is a British-born Anglican bishop in Australia. He has served as the Bishop of Willochra since 25 February 2023. He previously served from 6 August 2014 to 2022 as an assistant bishop in the Anglican Diocese of Perth.

== Early life, education and early ministry ==
James was born in Sidmouth, Devon in the United Kingdom. He studied at Sherborne School in Dorset and obtained a Bachelor of Arts in Theology from Oxford University.

On 4 January 1986 James migrated to Western Australia, initially to serve at Port Hedland as student chaplain for the Mission to Seafarers. After two years, he was sponsored by the Anglican Diocese of North West Australia and ordained by Archbishop Peter Carnley in June 1988.

He served as assistant curate at Northam for two years, before moving to the Parish of East Avon, centred on the wheatbelt communities of Cunderdin, Meckering, Tammin and Quairading. After further study in the United Kingdom, he served at Yanchep; Quinns, Mindarie and Butler; and then Dianella which was his final appointment before being appointed to the episcopate.

James is a Tertiary in the Society of Saint Francis.

== Episcopal ministry ==
On 6 August 2014, James was consecrated as Assistant Bishop in the Diocese of Perth. As assistant bishop, he has Episcopal Oversight of the Claremont, Coastal, Joondalup, Swan, Avon and Goldfields Deaneries.

On 29 October 2022, James was elected as the next Bishop of Willochra. He provided a statement at the time that he had a "deep love for rural and remote country people, and I have a strong sense of calling to them", and that "the challenges they face, spiritual, mental, financial and physical" were "the whole people of God to be lived with and in that place comes God's strength and encouragement". He was installed on 25 February 2023.

Anglican Communion titles
Preceded by John Stead	Bishop of Willochra; 2023–	Incumbent
