= St Boniface Cathedral, Bunbury =

Church in Bunbury, Western Australia

- Cathedral Church of St Boniface
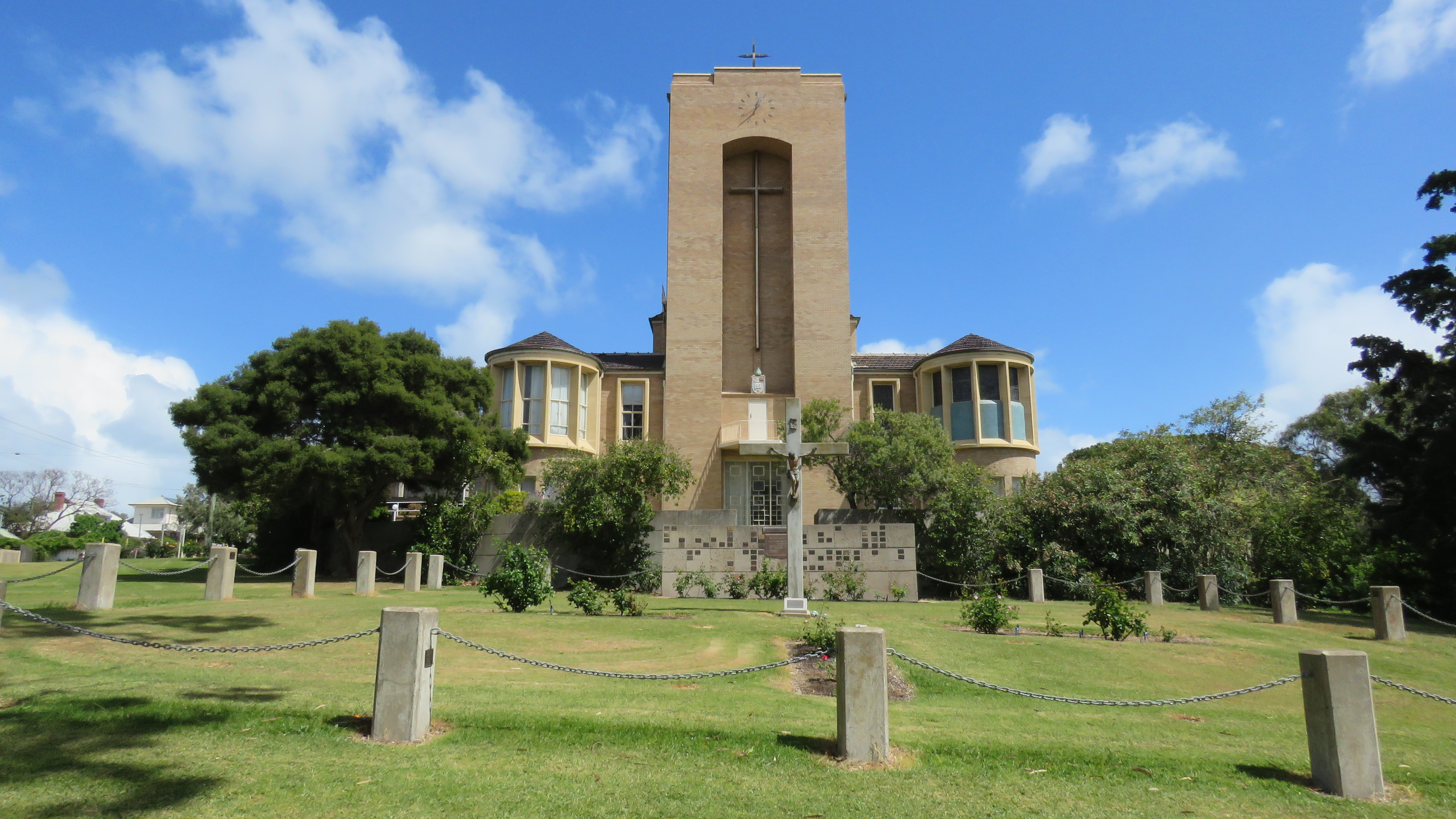
- The cathedral in 2023
- St Boniface Cathedral, Bunbury
- 33°19′53″S 115°38′16″E
- Location: Bunbury, Western Australia
- Address: 33 Parkfield Street, Bunbury WA 6230
- Country: Australia
- Denomination: Anglican Church of Australia
- Website: bunburycathedral.org.au

History
- Status: Cathedral
- Dedication: Saint Boniface
- Consecrated: 14 October 1962

Architecture
- Functional status: Active
- Heritage designation: State Register of Heritage Places
- Designated: 15 April 2003
- Previous cathedrals: St Paul's Pro-Cathedral, Bunbury
- Architects: Louis Williams; Robert Blatchford
- Architectural type: Cathedral
- Style: Post-War Ecclesiastical
- Years built: 1961–1962
- Completed: November 1962
- Construction cost: £91,116

Specifications
- Materials: Yellow face brick, Terracotta tiles

Administration
- Province: Western Australia
- Diocese: Bunbury
- Parish: Bunbury

Clergy
- Bishop: Ian Coutts
- Dean: Darryl Cotton

Western Australia Heritage Register
- Official name: St Boniface Anglican Cathedral
- Type: State Registered Place
- Criteria: 11.1., 11.2., 11.3., 11.4., 12.1., 12.2., 12.3, 12.4., 12.5.
- Designated: 15 April 2003
- Reference no.: 05667

St Boniface Cathedral is an Anglican cathedral in Bunbury, a coastal city in the south west region of Western Australia. It was consecrated in 1962.

== Location ==
The cathedral is the focal point of a precinct of ecclesiastical buildings on Brent Tor, an elevated location south of central Bunbury. One of the city's highest sites, the precinct also includes Bishopscourt (residence of the Bishop of Bunbury), a Calvary Wayside Shrine and Memorial Lawn, and the Walker Memorial Hall and Church Offices, as well as the Archdeacon's Residence, Deanery, and Former Deanery.

== Description ==
The cathedral is built of double yellow face brickwork. It has a parapeted clock tower, an undercroft crypt, stained glass memorial windows, and a gabled terracotta tiled roof.

Architecturally, the cathedral has been described as "... an outstanding example of the Post-War Ecclesiastical style ...", and as "modern Gothic".

According to the Assessment Documentation prepared by the Heritage Council of Western Australia for the cathedral's and Bishopscourt's joint inclusion in the State Register of Heritage Places as a Parent Place or Precinct, the cathedral was and is:

"... the first Anglican cathedral erected in a regional area [of Western Australia], ... the first Anglican cathedral built and consecrated [in the State] in the 20th century, and the only war memorial cathedral erected in Western Australia. It is one of only four cathedrals in regional areas of this State, one of the two such cathedrals in the Post-War Ecclesiastical design style, and the only one that follows the traditional rectangular cruciform plan of church design."

Amongst the materials used in the cathedral's construction were 410,000 standard bricks, 8,000 special bricks, 75,000 roof tiles, and 700 LT (710 t) of concrete. A total of 24,000 ft (7,300 m) of blackbutt (Note: Blackbutt is a common name for wood from several species of Eucalyptus, and it is unclear which this one is.) timber was required to complete the nave ceiling; the floor parquetry is fashioned from 200 sq yd (170 m^{2}) of the same timber.

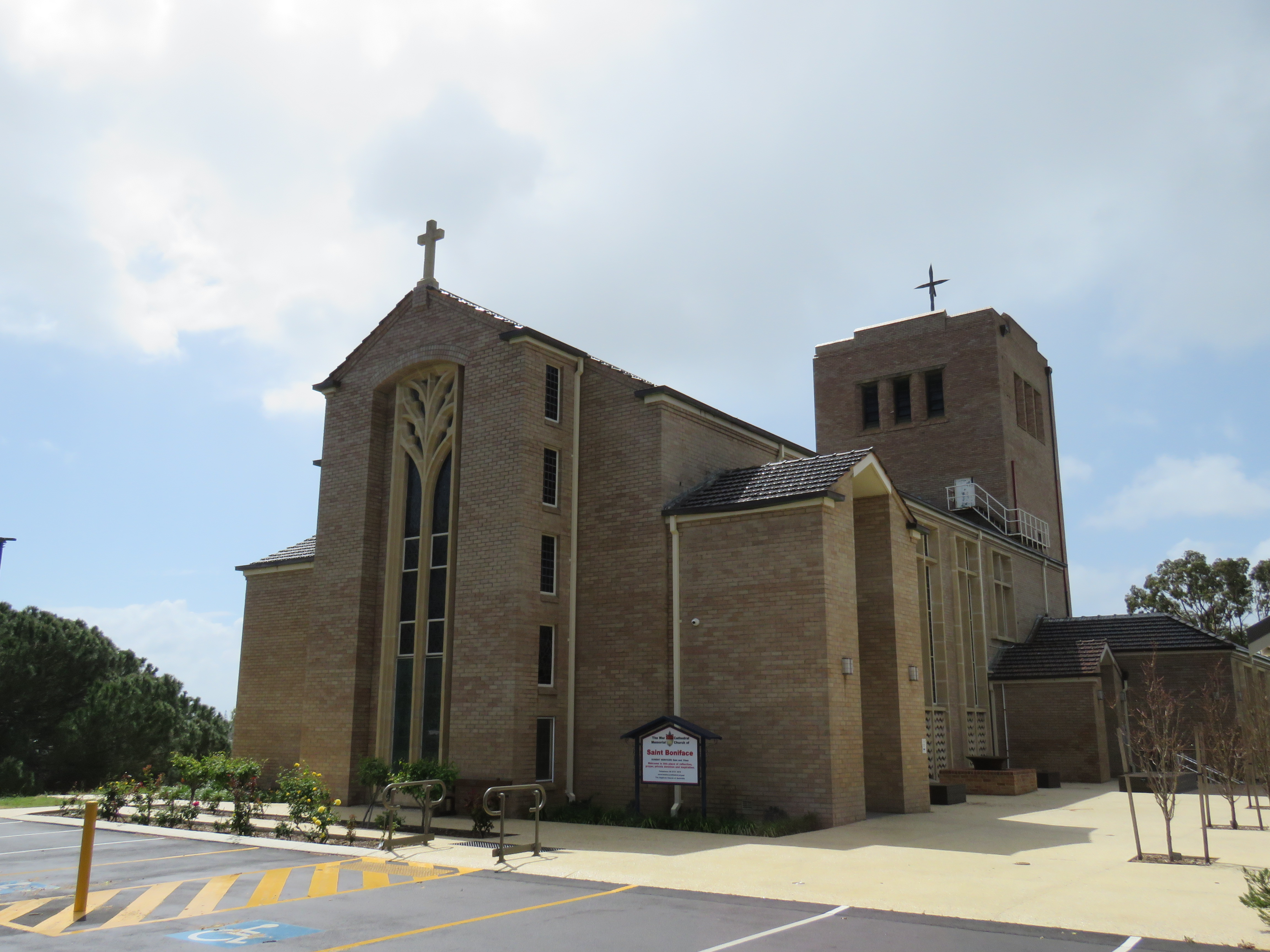
The cathedral from the south west

The western elevation of the cathedral is in the form of a brick gable. Projecting from its centre is a full height gabled bay, with a cross at the apex. In the middle of the projection, recessed into its alcove, is a stained glass window, also full height; it is decorated with stone tracery in the form of the tree of life.

On the south side of the western elevation is a south-facing double height main entrance porch framed by a pair of wide brick piers, and gabled. The main entrance itself is a pair of ledge and braced doors beneath a tall highlight window recessed into the porch.

At its eastern end, on both sides of the tower, the cathedral descends one level, to a wide semi-circular terrace with a concrete retaining wall. From there, a set of stairs leads down further to the Memorial Lawn at natural ground level.

== See also ==
- Bunbury Cathedral Grammar School
- List of Anglican churches in Western Australia
- List of State Register of Heritage Places in the City of Bunbury
