= Leslie Knight =

New Zealand bishop

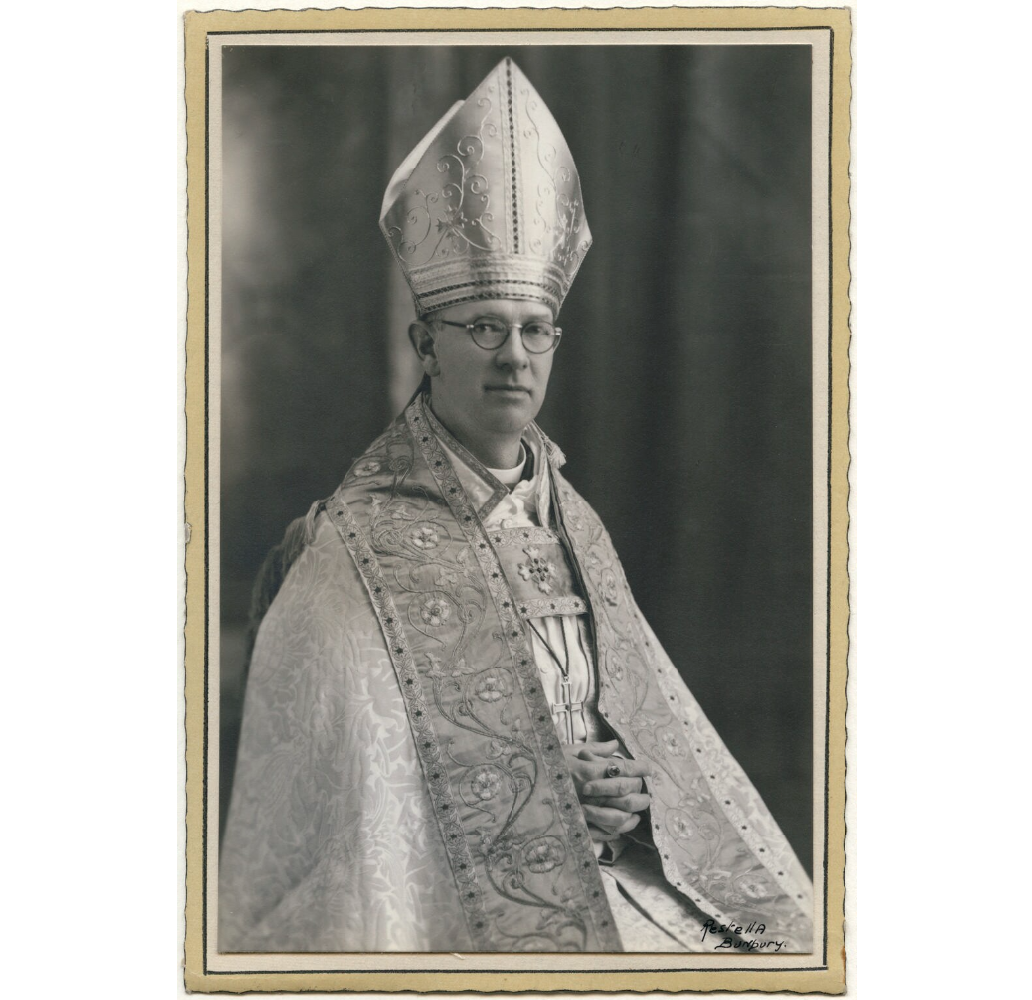

Leslie Albert Knight was the third Anglican Bishop of Bunbury from 1938 to 1950

Knight as born on 4 August 1890 and educated at Christchurch Boys' High School and the University of New Zealand; and ordained in 1915 His first post was a curacy at Fendalton and then as a chaplain to the NZEF in France. At the end of World War I he was vicar of Leithfield then Kaiapoi. Next he was rector and chaplain of St Saviour's Boys’ Orphanage, Timaru. His last appointment before ordination to the episcopate was as warden of St Barnabas' Theological College, Adelaide. He died on 31 December 1950. His wife was President of the Mothers’ Union Commonwealth Council.

Anglican Communion titles
Preceded by Cecil Wilson	Bishop of Bunbury; 1938-1950	Succeeded by Donald Redding
