= Robert McCall =

Robert McCall may refer to:

- Robert McCall (figure skater) (1958–1991), Canadian ice dancer
- Robert McCall (barrister) (1849–1934), Irish lawyer
- Robert McCall, a fictional Defense Intelligence Agency operative in The Equalizer franchise, portrayed by Denzel Washington and Edward Woodward.
- Robert McCall (artist) (1919–2010), created many space artworks for NASA and 2001: A Space Odyssey
