= Thomas McCall =

Thomas McCall may refer to:

- Thomas McCall (inventor) (1834–1904), Scottish cartwright and bicycle inventor
- Thomas McCall (umpire) (born 1951), New Zealand cricket umpire
- Thomas E. McCall (1916–1965), U.S. Army soldier and Medal of Honor recipient
- Thomas J. McCall (1935–1981), member of the Pennsylvania House of Representatives
- Tom McCall (1913–1983), American politician and journalist from Oregon
- Tom McCall (Georgia politician), member of the Georgia House of Representatives
- Tommy McCall, Scottish footballer
- Thomas John McCall, the alter ego of the fictional superhero Badrock, who appears in comic books published by Image Comics.
