= Ralph Hawkins (bishop) =

Fifth Anglican Bishop of Bunbury

Ralph Gordon Hawkins CMG was the fifth Anglican Bishop of Bunbury from 1957 to 1977.

Hawkins was born in Newfoundland, Canada in 1911 and educated at University Memorial College in St John's and Durham University. He was ordained in 1936. His first post was a curacy at St Anne's Brislington, after which he was rector of Morawa and then of Wembley-Floreat Park. From 1943 he was a wartime chaplain in the RAAF then Rector of St Hilda's North Perth. In 1957 he became Archdeacon of Perth and Bishop of Bunbury, posts he held for 20 years. He died in July 1987.

Anglican Communion titles
Preceded by Donald Redding	Bishop of Bunbury; 1957-1977	Succeeded by Stanley Goldsworthy
