= All Saints Anglican Church, Canberra =

All Saints Church
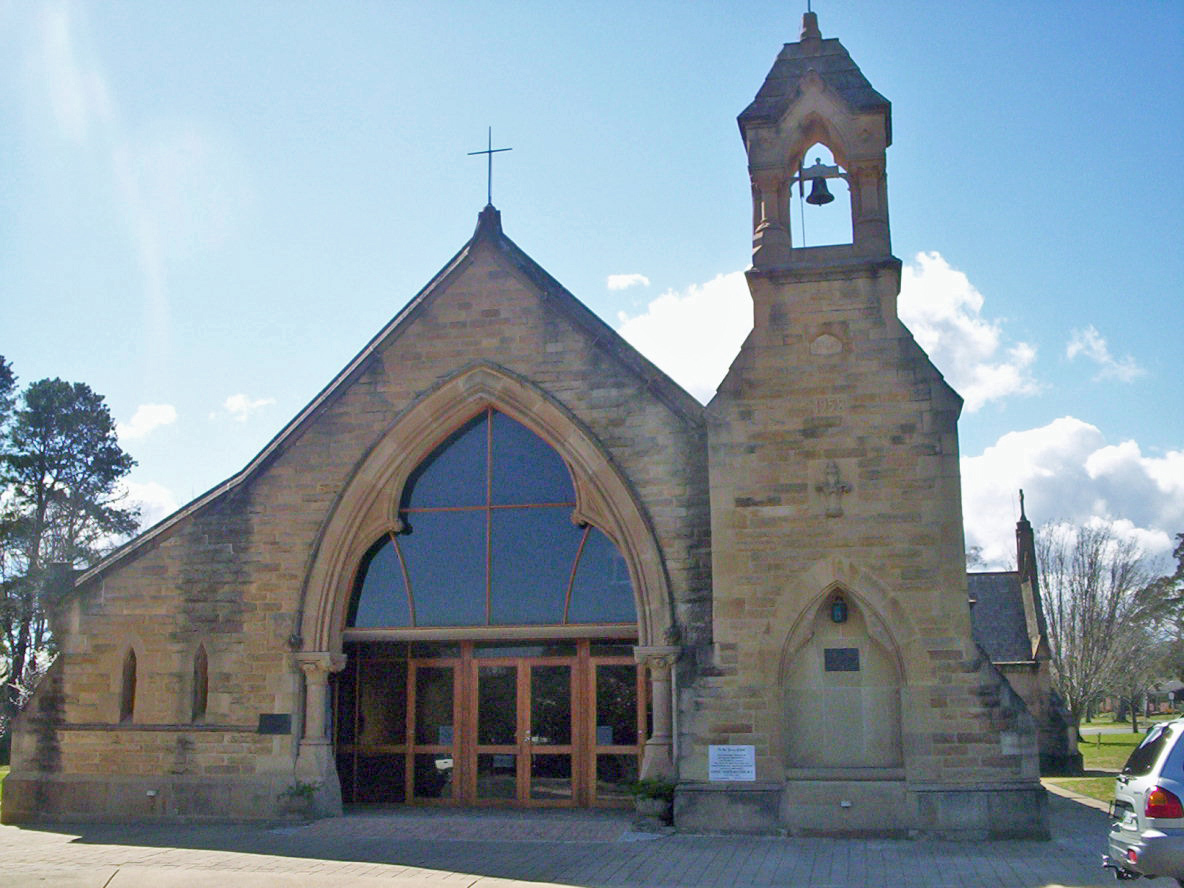
- All Saints Church with the bell tower moved to the opposite side when it was rebuilt

- Location in the Australian Capital Territory
- 35°15′53″S 149°8′22″E
- Location: Ainslie, Australian Capital Territory
- Country: Australia
- Denomination: Anglican
- Website: allsaintsainslie.org.au

History
- Status: Church
- Founded: 1958

Architecture
- Functional status: Active
- Architect: James Barnet
- Architectural type: Church

Specifications
- Materials: Sydney sandstone

Administration
- Diocese: Canberra and Goulburn

Clergy
- Rector: John Stead (Locum)

All Saints Church is an Australian Anglican Church in the Canberra suburb of Ainslie. The church is in the Anglican Diocese of Canberra and Goulburn. The parish holds to a liberal Anglo-Catholic style of churchmanship and theology.

== Description ==
The original building (designed by the Colonial Architect, James Barnet) started as the First Mortuary station in Rookwood Cemetery, Sydney, as noted on a plaque on the church:

"The stonework of this church was originally used to build the first mortuary station on the branch railway to the necropolis rookwood near Sydney. This plaque was presented by the Australian Railway Historical Society to commemorate the old station which was in use from 1868 to 1948."

The railway line went underneath the main arch in the building, where the aisle is in the present church. The side aisles are where the platforms for the station were located. Coffins would be taken out on the railway line to the cemetery for burial. The roof of the building burned down in a fire. The Ainslie parish bought the stonework for £A100, and the stonework was transported to Canberra in 1957 where the current roof was built and work undertaken to turn it into the present church. In the process, the bell tower was moved from the left side of the entrance to the right.

There are two stained-glass windows from England. The east window is from St Clement's, Attercliffe, in Sheffield. There is a second, smaller, window from St Margaret's Bagendon in Gloucestershire.

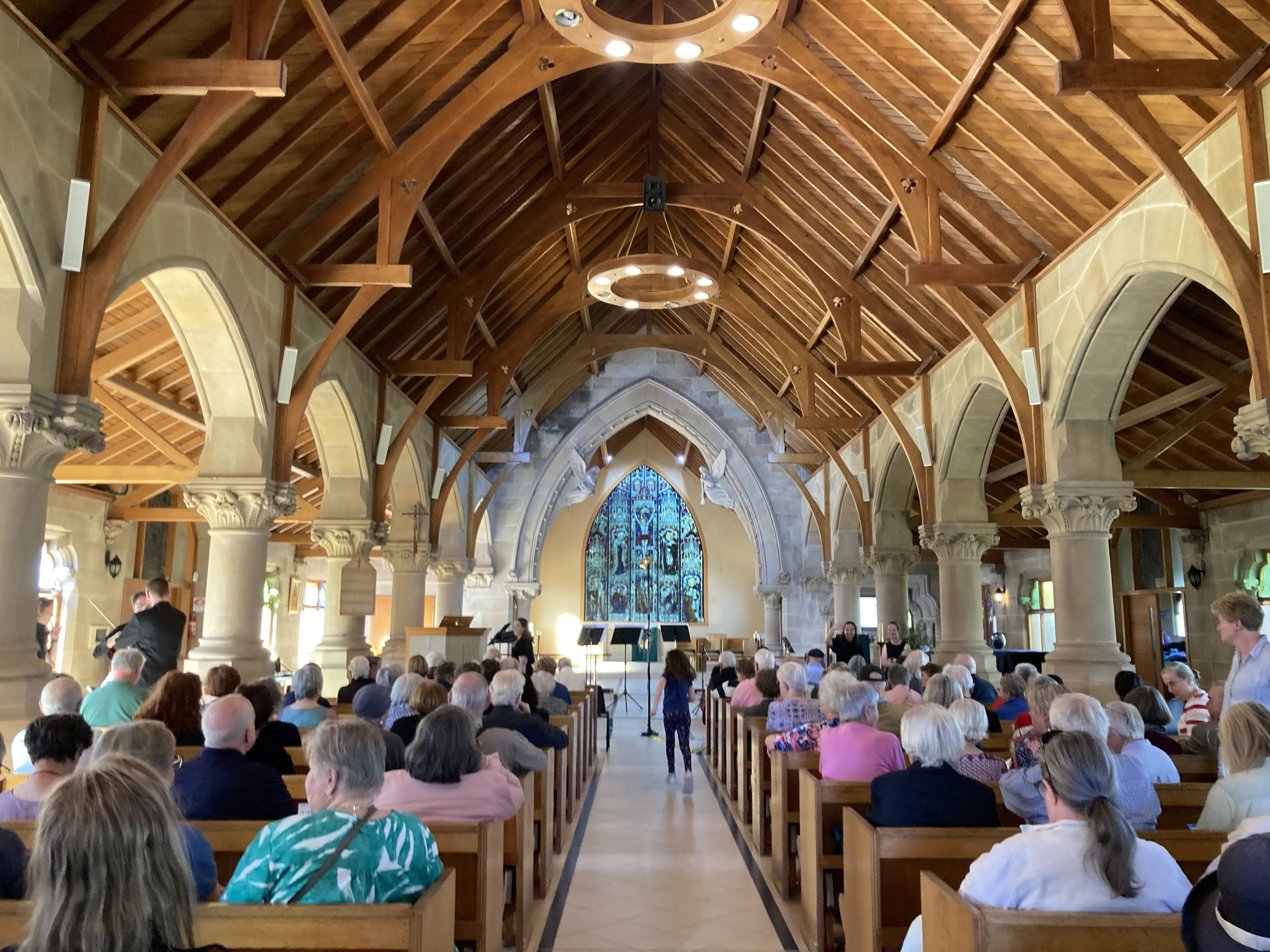
The interior of the church in 2023

The church bell was originally on a Shay locomotive owned by the Commonwealth Oil Corporation that ran on the former Wolgan Valley Railway in the Blue Mountains, before being dismantled in 1925. The bell was presented to the church by the Australian Railway Historical Society in 1958.

A stone on the church was set by the High Commissioner for the United Kingdom, Lord Carrington, to mark the blessing of the church on 1 June 1958.

The church contains a rare 1857 Bishop and Starr pipe organ, installed in 1989–90 after being transferred from Wealdstone Baptist Church in Harrow, England.

All Saints maintains a traditional choir, with a weekly sung Solemn Eucharist and a monthly Evensong from April to September.

At the east end of the church is a garden and columbarium. The church has several stained glass windows, and gargoyle sculptures on the outside of the building. On the inside stonework are two carved angels. It has two side chapels located on opposite sides of the chancel, one dedicated to the Virgin Mary and the other after Gethsemane.

== Heritage list ==
The church was added to the Australian Capital Territory Heritage Register on 14 September 2000.

== Rectors ==
- Edward Gilbert Buckle, 1959-62. Buckle was later the Assistant Bishop of Auckland.
- Francis Robert Woodwell, 1963-66. Woodwell was later Archdeacon of Tumut.
- Neville James Chynoweth, 1966-71. Chynoweth was later Bishop of Gippsland.
- James Lewis Tregea, 1971-80.
- Ronald Earl Moon, 1980-87. Moon was later Dean of Goulburn.
- Dennis Arnold Vanderwolf, 1987-98. Vanderwolf was later Dean of Darwin.
- Anthony John Parkes, 1998-2004. Parkes was later Bishop of Wangaratta.
- Sarah Anne Macneil, 2004-09. Macneil was later Bishop of Grafton.
- Michael Faragher, 2009-14.
- Lynda McMinn, 2015-2023.
- John Stead, 2023–2024.
- Alipate Tuineau, 2024-present.

== Gallery ==
The Mortuary Station in Rookwood Cemetery c. 1865

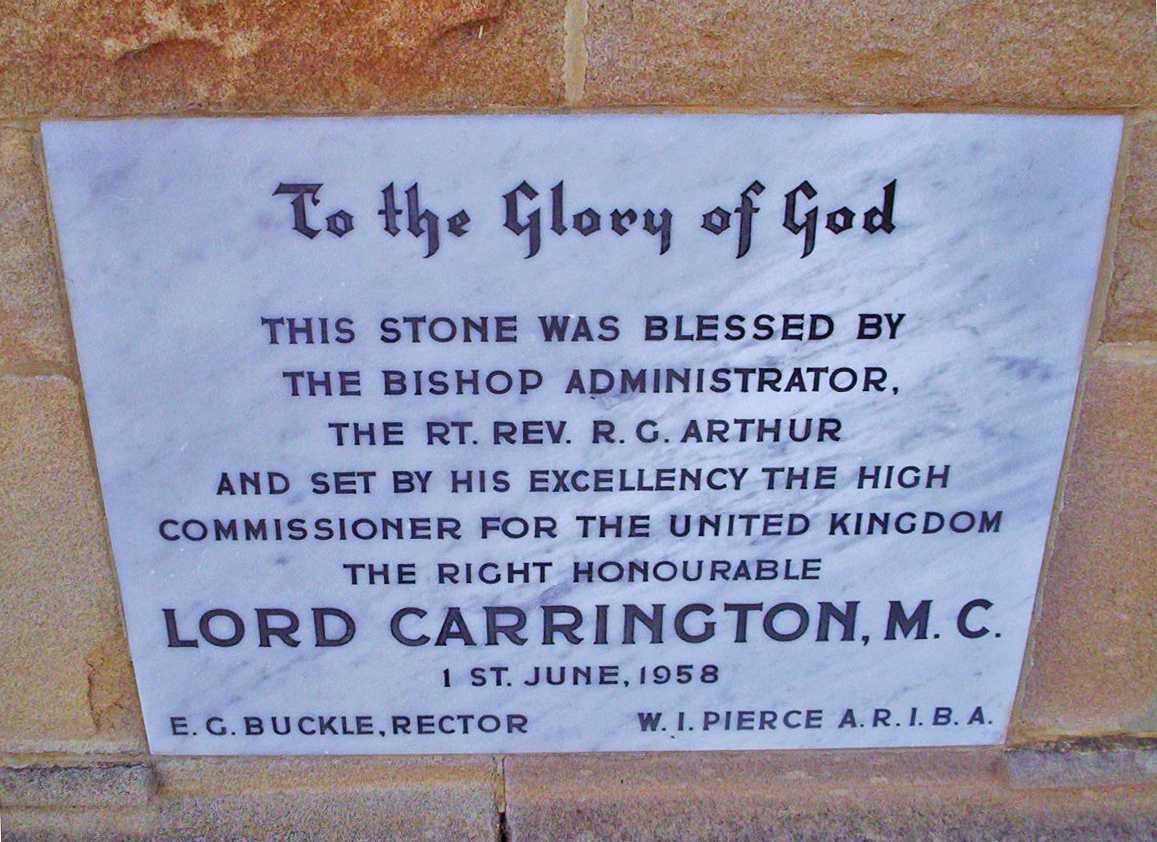
Stone set on the blessing of the church in 1958

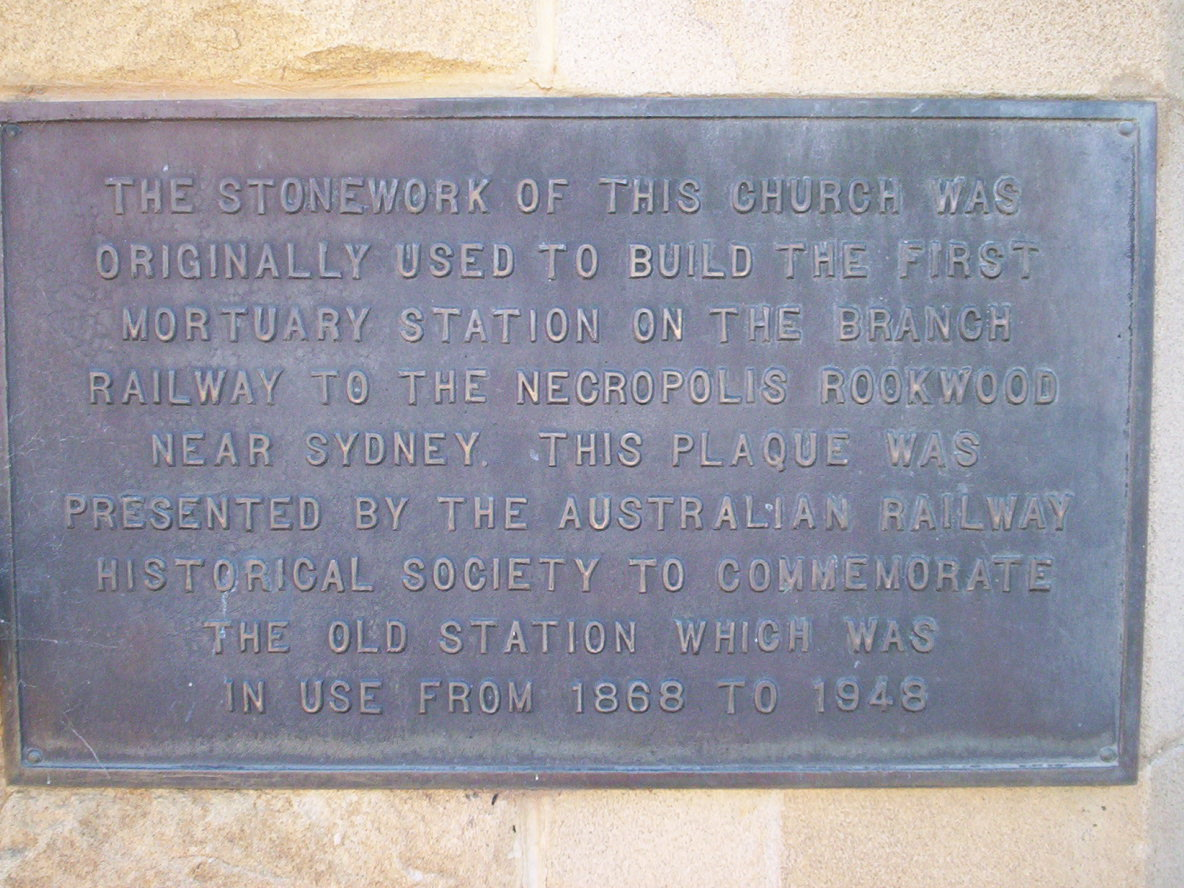
Plaque on the church

== See also ==
- List of Anglican church buildings in Australia
- Australian non-residential architectural styles
