= Anglican Bishop of Bunbury =

Bishop of Bunbury
- Bishopric

anglican
- Coat of arms of the Diocese
- Incumbent: Ian Coutts since 3 November 2018
- Style: The Right Reverend

Location
- Country: Australia
- Ecclesiastical province: Western Australia

Information
- First holder: Frederick Goldsmith
- Denomination: Anglicanism
- Established: 1904
- Diocese: Bunbury
- Cathedral: St Boniface's Cathedral, Bunbury

Website
- Diocese of Bunbury

The Bishop of Bunbury is the diocesan bishop of the Anglican Diocese of Bunbury, Australia.

== List of Bishops of Bunbury ==
Bishops of Bunbury
No	From	Until	Incumbent	Notes
1	1904	1917	Frederick Goldsmith	Previously Dean of Perth; resigned and returned to England.
2	1917	1937	Cecil Wilson	Translated from Melanesia; retired.
3	1938	1950	Leslie Knight	Died in office.
4	1951	1957	Donald Redding	Returned to parish ministry.
5	1957	1977	Ralph Hawkins	Retired.
6	1977	1983	Stanley Goldsworthy	Previously Archdeacon of Wangaratta; returned to parish ministry.
7	1984	2000	Hamish Jamieson	Translated from Carpentaria.
8	2000	2010	David McCall	Translated from Willochra.
9	2010	2017	Allan Ewing	Previously an assistant bishop in Canberra and Goulburn.
10	2018	present	Ian Coutts	Installed 3 November 2018.
