= William McCall =

William, Willie, or Bill McCall may refer to:

- William McCall (actor) (1870–1938), American film actor
- William McCall (politician) (1908–1968), Australian politician
- William Frank McCall Jr. (1916–1991), architect
- Willie McCall (footballer, born 1898) (1898–1966), Scottish footballer
- Willie McCall (footballer, born 1920) (1920–1985), Scottish footballer
- Bill McCall (baseball) (1898–1943), American Negro league baseball player
- Bill McCall (trade unionist) (1929–2021), Scottish trade union leader
