= Frederick Goldsmith =

Bishop of Bunbury; British Anglican bishop

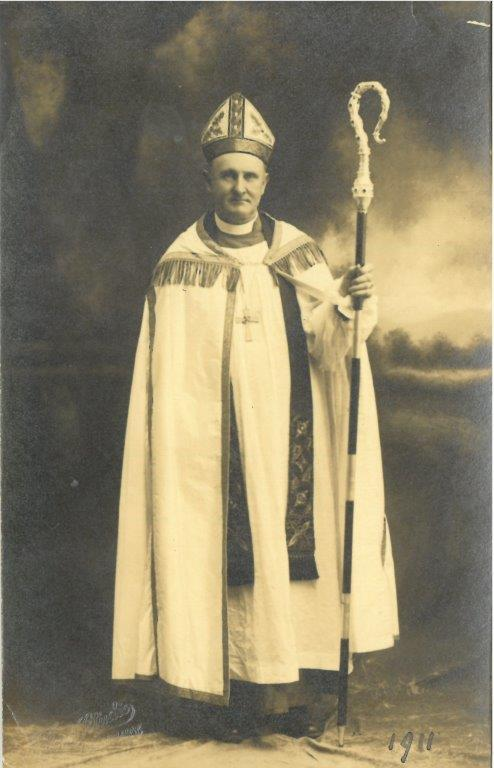
Goldsmith in 1911

Frederick Goldsmith (1853 – 7 July 1932) was the inaugural Bishop of Bunbury from 1904 to 1917.

Born in 1853 and an 1876 graduate of St John's College, Oxford, Goldmith was Private chaplain to Spencer Maryon-Wilson, of Charlton House, then Vicar of Halling, Kent. He was Dean of Perth, Western Australia from 1888 until 1904 when he was appointed to the episcopate. Resigning in 1917 and returning to the UK, he was Rural Dean of Hampstead until his retirement in 1921. Having become a Doctor of Divinity (DD), he died on 7 July 1932.

Anglican Communion titles
New office	Bishop of Bunbury; 1904–1917	Succeeded by Cecil Wilson
