= Samuel Thornton (bishop) =

British Anglican bishop (1835–1917)

Samuel Thornton (1835–1917) was an Anglican bishop in the late quarter of the 19th century and the start of the 20th.

Thornton was born in London on 16 April 1835 and educated at Merchant Taylors' School and Queen's College, Oxford. He was ordained in 1859 and after a spell at the London Diocesan Home Mission became Vicar of St Jude's, Whitechapel. From 1864 to 1875 he was Rector of St George's, Birmingham. In 1875 he was appointed Bishop of Ballarat, a post he held until 1900. On his return to England he became Vicar of Blackburn and an Assistant Bishop in the Diocese of Manchester. He became a notable proponent of British Israelism. He died on 25 November 1917.

== Notes ==
Anglican Communion titles
Preceded by Inaugural appointment	Bishop of Ballarat; 1875 – 1900	Succeeded by Arthur Vincent Green
