= Anglican Diocese of Ballarat =

Diocese of the Anglican Church of Australia

Diocese of Ballarat
- Coat of arms

Location
- Ecclesiastical province: Victoria
- Archdeaconries: Archdeaconry of Ballarat; Archdeaconry for Mission and Evangelism with Responsibility for the South West Region
- Coordinates: 37°33′49″S 143°51′28″E

Statistics
- Parishes: 24
- Churches: 81

Information
- Denomination: Anglican
- Cathedral: Cathedral of Christ the King, Ballarat

Current leadership
- Parent church: Anglican Church of Australia
- Bishop: Garry Weatherill

Website
- ballaratanglican.org.au

The Diocese of Ballarat is a diocese of the Anglican Church of Australia, which was created out of the Diocese of Melbourne in 1875. It is situated in the Ballarat region of the state of Victoria, Australia and covers the south-west region of the state. The diocesan cathedral is the Cathedral of Christ the King in Ballarat. Garry Weatherill, formerly the Bishop of Willochra between 2000 and 2011, was installed as the 10th Bishop of Ballarat on 5 November 2011.

== History ==
The Diocese of Ballarat was created (in virtue of the power given by Act 18 Vic. No. 45) by an Act of the Church Assembly of the Diocese of Melbourne (then coextensive with Victoria), on 30 October 1873. The inaugural bishop Samuel Thornton was consecrated on 1 May 1875 by A. C. Tait, Archbishop of Canterbury, in Westminster Abbey. The Diocese began its active existence on the day of his enthronement at Ballarat in Christ Church Pro-Cathedral on 11 August 1875.

Ballarat is one of five dioceses of the Anglican Church of Australia in the ecclesiastical Province of Victoria.

== Cathedral ==
The Cathedral of Christ the King in Ballarat is the cathedral church of the diocese.

The date of the first Anglican service in Ballarat is problematic. Undoubtedly it occurred soon after the discovery of gold late in August 1851. A history of St Paul's Bakery Hill contends that it was on 12 October 1851, when an open-air service conducted by the Revd J. Cheyne from Burnbank was held in a tent. It was a musical service, with hymns accompanied by violin and flute, and was so well received that an evening service was held by lamplight. Ballarat historian W. B. Withers is vague on early details, saying the Anglicans followed on the heels of the Wesleyans. Spielvogel records that it was the Revd William Sim and the Revd A. Morrison who held a service in a tent in November 1851 not far from the present site of St Paul's Bakery Hill. Yet another Anglican source plumps for the Revd Charles Perks of St Peter's, Eastern Hill who visited and officiated at an outdoor service under the escarpment later overlooked by Christ Church.

Following the survey of the township of Ballarat, a large block of land in Lydiard Street South was set aside for church purposes. There was little building activity until 1854, when the Revd James R.H. Thackeray was appointed in July. In September 1854 collections were taken up for a fund to build a "church and parsonage", services in August being held in the court house. Thackeray's first church was in a tent and in October 1854 a school began in the tent, with William Barton as schoolmaster. There were as many as 80 children crammed into the tent and, in March 1855, Thackeray allowed the school to be transferred to Bakery Hill.

Early in October 1854, Henry Bowyer Lane, government architect at the Ballarat Camp, called tenders for the "Erection of a Church in the Township of Ballarat", according to plans to be seen at his office. Building began in 1854 after £250 had been subscribed, and a ceremony was held to lay the foundation stone. But building proceeded slowly and Thackeray was dismissed in August 1855 when he could not account for the money subscribed for the building fund and even tried to sell off the Creswick church. (Spooner, p. 18; Moore, p. 127; Star, 22 September 1855) The Revd John Potter came to Ballarat from Ballan and, with the support of James Stewart and Adam Augustus Lynn, was able to open a temporary chapel building in Armstrong Street on 16 September 1855. A report in the Ballarat Times on 15 September 1856 noted that "a school house and place of worship will be provided as soon as possible". According to Spielvogel, this was ready by October 1855.

An article in The Ballarat Star on 16 July 1856 describes a meeting to form a Church of England Association in Ballarat. John Potter was in charge and noted that he has been in Ballarat "for twelve months". He also noted that "a small attempt only has been made to procure a building suitable for Divine Worship". The basalt church, designed by Lane in 1854, was finally completed in 1857 by Backhouse and Reynolds of Geelong as contractors for a price of £2,000. It was dedicated on 13 September 1857. The same contractors and architects were responsible for the nearby Lydiard Street Wesleyan Church, built of stone in 1858 for £5000. Christ Church was built of basalt quarried at Bond Street, Ballarat, and measured 76 feet by 36 feet, with cedar furnishings supplied by a Mr Helpin of Geelong. From the 1850s, the choir was important, with a paid choir at least from 1859.

The women of the parish took on the task of sewing the table linens and soft furnishings for the church, led by Loftus Lynn, wife of Ballarat's first solicitor. Adam Loftus Lynn was a leading member of the early church, and he imported a house which was constructed on the site of the Ballarat Club. They had a total of 11 children, who also contributed much to the social activity of the church. Lynn's Chambers in Lydiard Street, opposite the church, commemorates the Lynn family. An article on architecture in the Ballarat Star in 1862 mentions "there has been some talk of building a tower and otherwise enlarging Christ Church, erected some years ago in the early English style of architecture, but the efforts of the congregation seem to have ceased for the present". The congregation asked the Melbourne architect Leonard Terry, who had designed the banks in Lydiard Street, to undertake additions to the existing building in 1867.

In 1868 the sanctuary and transepts were built by Edward James at a cost of £1,792 and in September that year the western half of the church (now cathedral) hall was opened as a school hall. A great celebration for the church came on 11 August 1875, when Samuel Thornton was installed as the first bishop of the new Diocese of Ballarat.

Henry Caselli, who arrived in Ballarat in 1855, and became a member of the Christ Church community, was at some point appointed diocesan architect. He designed many churches around Ballarat and always gave half his services gratuitously, as well as being a generous donor to building funds. His 20-year-old daughter Georgiana was buried from Christ Church in 1866.

Early in 1882, Caselli and Figgis called tenders for the bishop's registry, council chambers and other facilities for Christ Church. At the time of Caselli's death in 1885, he held a prominent position as a leader of Christ Church, and was accorded a farewell by the bishop on 5 March 1885. From the arrival of Bishop Thornton, there were dreams of building a fine cathedral which would have a frontage onto Dana Street. With this in mind the old vicarage, which dated from 1854 to 1855, was demolished and the present deanery built. A public meeting was held at the Alfred Hall on 10 September 1886 to launch the idea of the cathedral. The diocese conducted a design competition, and of the 24 entries received from leading Victorian architects, the design of Tappin, Gilbert and Dennehy was accepted in early 1887, and a fund was opened for the building, which soon amounted to £1710.

The original plan had been to build the cathedral over the existing church, but there were so many difficulties to the plan that it was decided to begin on a new site on the corner of Dana and Lydiard Streets. The new deanery was completed on 26 April 1888. There was a ceremonial laying of the foundation stone of the cathedral on 30 November 1888, when the Governor, Sir Henry Loch, came to do the honours. John Manifold laid £500 on the stone as a donation to the building fund. But the Depression of the 1890s made money scarce, and the failure of a number of banks saw significant losses suffered by members of the diocese. Many parishioners felt that Christ Church was perfectly adequate as a cathedral, especially when the architect William Tappin estimated that the cathedral would cost £50,000 to build, exclusive of the tower and spire.

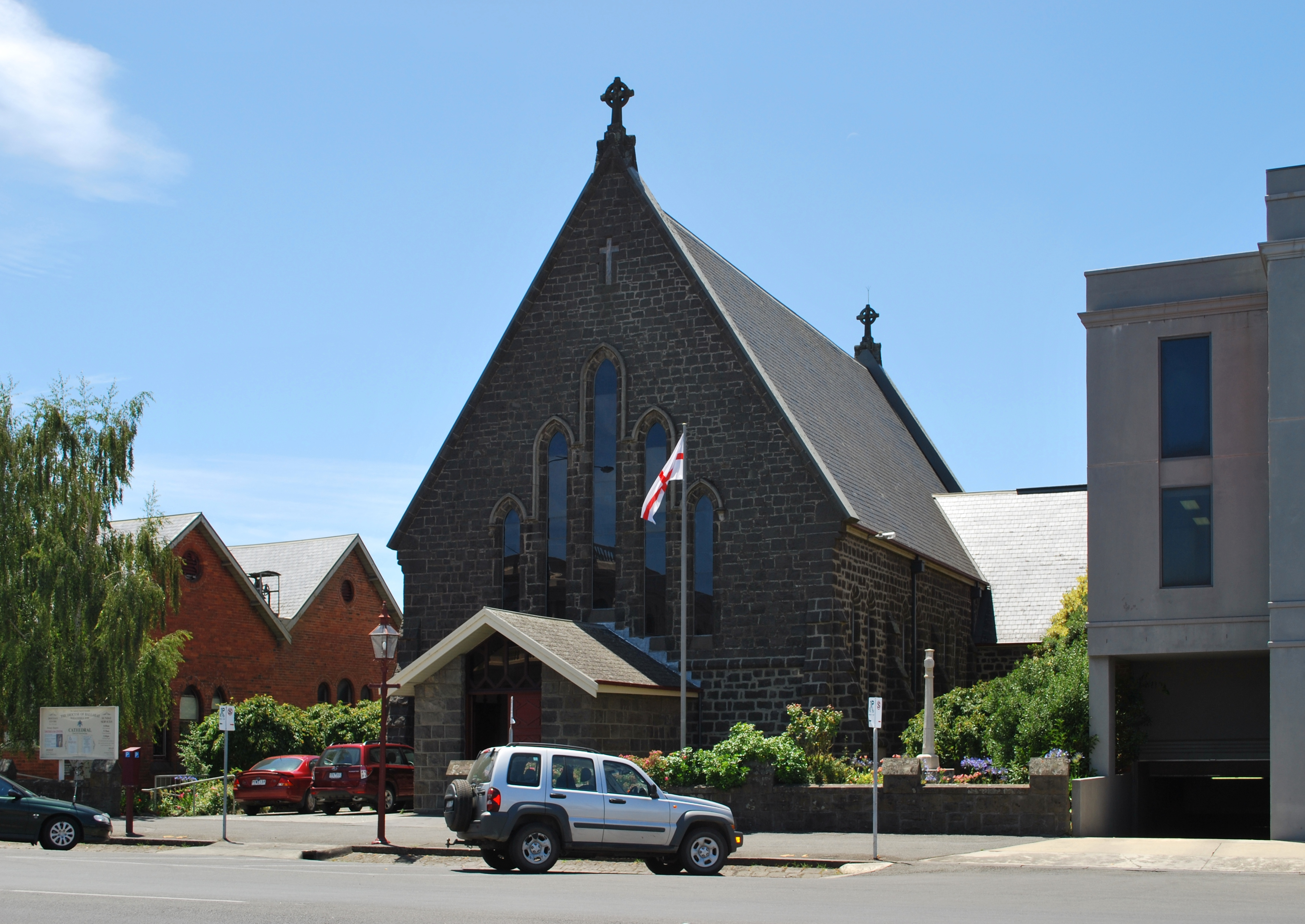
Cathedral of Christ the King, Ballarat

Work finally began in 1903, when a tender of £3,624 was accepted for completion of the diocesan offices. New plans were submitted by the architectural firm of Smart, Tappin and Peebles, with work resuming between 1903 and 1908, before it finally stalled. Bluestone for the chapter house was quarried at Redan, and Waurn Ponds stone was used for the doors, arches and traceries. When funds ran out in 1904, and no support was forthcoming from England, the grand cathedral plan was abandoned. The portion of the plan that was erected was called the Manifold Chapter House in 1908, when the first Synod was held in the building in November 1908. It was dedicated on 10 November 1908, at a cost of £12,000.

William Thomson Manifold (1861-1922), a pastoralist from Purrumbete near Camperdown, was a generous benefactor to the Anglican diocese. He was educated at Geelong Church of England Grammar School and Jesus College, Cambridge. He supported Anglican and local institutions, making considerable donations, often with his brothers. The Church of England cathedral and chapter house in Ballarat, Queen's College and Ballarat Grammar School benefited from their generosity. Manifold was vicar's warden of St Paul's, Camperdown, a member of the synod and of the bishop's council.

As time passed, improvements were made to the pro-cathedral, each improvement making the dream of the great cathedral recede even further. In 1923 Bishop Maxwell Maxwell-Gumbleton decided that Christ Church should be remodelled to conform as far as its design would allow, as a cathedral church. The chancel was extended into the nave, and its floor raised. Screens were placed across the transept arches and a throne of blackwood was placed on the south side of the chancel. In 1929 a new organ was installed.

At the end of the 1930s the church was further improved by the erection of a reredos and paneling to the east. A gift from the Friends of Canterbury Cathedral came in 1935, when a stone replica of an 8th-century cross from the cathedral was presented to Ballarat and set into the arch (left hand side) near the altar. The Friends of Canterbury Cathedral made similar gifts to all the other cathedrals in Australia.

In 1972, the front porch was added, and the baptistery moved to the west end of the nave. A major development came in 1989 when the diocesan centre was added, the architect being John Vernon. In 1993 the choir and organ gallery was added. In 2004 a new pipe organ was installed.

In the 1980s, the diocese sold the old cathedral site (the chapter house) and it was used as a disco, called Hot Gossip, for about a decade from June 1988. It was later called The Chapel Nightclub. In 2007, the old chapter house became a residential apartment.

The history of Ballarat diocese was written by John Spooner. Entitled The Golden See, it was published in 1989 and covers the period from the beginning of the colony of Victoria in 1834 until 1975.

On 13 November 2025 a local man entered the church with a jerry can and set fire to part of the church, destroying the altar, a lectern and antique furniture. The multiple fires were quickly extinguished by church staff. Police estimated the damage to be around $75,000.

=== Deans of Ballarat ===
- 2022–present: Michael Davies
- 2014–2020: Chris Chataway
- 2009–2011: Graeme Perkins
- 2005–2008: Geoffrey Tisdall
- 1999–2004: Jeffery T. Gunn
- 1987–1998: William Ernest Edebohls
- 1984–1987: Neville Allan Connell
- 1979–1983: Kenneth Gordon Beer
- 1972–1979: William Wynn Devonshire
- 1967–1972: Samuel Douglas Bartholomeusz
- 1958–1967: Francis Charles Blake Moyle
- 1954–1958: Roger Sinclair Correll
- 1951–1953: John Alexander Munro
- 1921–1934: William Frederic Tucker
- 1914–1920: Julius Lewis
- 1897–1914: Nathaniel Lindon Parkyn
- 1894–1897: John Francis Stretch

== Assistant bishops ==
Graham Walden was an assistant bishop of the diocese in 1988.

== Archdeaconries ==
Archdeaconries and archdeacons of the diocese have included:

Archdeacons of the Loddon

- 3 March 1885 – 1894: John Allnutt, incumbent of St Stephen's Portland
