= Warwick Bastian =

Anglican bishop of Albany

Warwick Shaw Bastian (4 December 1914 – 4 October 1979) was an Anglican bishop in Australia. He was the assistant bishop of the Diocese of Bunbury (with the title bishop of Albany) from 1968 to 1979.

== Early life ==
Bastian was born in 1914 in Subiaco, Western Australia, to Thomas Albert Bastian and his wife Florence Gertrude (née Shaw). Prior to ordination, he was secretary at the Big Bell Gold Mine in Cue, Western Australia (1935-1939).

== Clerical career ==
Bastian trained for ordination at St Barnabas College, Adelaide, obtaining the ThL from the Australian College of Theology in 1943. He was ordained deacon in 1943 and priest in 1944. He served his curacy at St Mark's, Bencubbin (1943-1944) and was then successively priest-in-charge of St John's, Kununoppin (1944-1946), curate at St John's, Fremantle (1946-1948), rector of Holy Trinity, York (1948-1954), priest-in-charge of St Thomas of Canterbury, Wyallagee (1954-1956), priest-in-charge of Kensington (1956-1957), and diocesan registrar of the Diocese of Perth (1959-1962). Overlapping with some of these appointments, he was also chaplain to the Archbishop of Perth, Robert Moline (1951-1962). He was then appointed as canon residentiary and sub-dean of St Boniface Cathedral in Bunbury and also archdeacon of Albany (1963-1966). His last appointment before elevation to the episcopate was as archdeacon of Bunbury (1966-1968).

In 1968, he was consecrated coadjutor bishop of Bunbury, with the title Bishop of Albany, in St Boniface Cathedral. His see was St John's, Albany. He retired in 1979, shortly before his death. To date (2022), Bastian is the only appointment of a bishop of Albany.

== Personal life ==
Bastian was unmarried. He died in 1979, aged 64, and was cremated at Karrakatta. His archives are held in the J S Battye Library.
