= Ian Coutts (bishop) =

Ian Alexander Coutts (born 1956) has been Anglican Bishop of Bunbury in Western Australia since 2018.

He was educated at the University of Warwick (BA, 1977), Jesus College, Oxford (MSc, 1980), King's College London and Charles Sturt University, Sydney (PhD, 2015). He and his wife moved to Australia in 2011. They have two daughters.

Anglican Communion titles
Preceded by Allan Ewing	Bishop of Bunbury; 2018–present	Incumbent
