= Anglican Diocese of Willochra =

Diocese of the Anglican Church of Australia

Coordinates: 33°16′04″S 138°21′25″E

Diocese of Willochra
- Coat of arms

Location
- Country: Australia
- Territory: Most of South Australia, ie: Mid North; Yorke Peninsula; Eyre Peninsula; Far North
- Ecclesiastical province: South Australia
- Metropolitan: Archbishop of Adelaide

Information
- Denomination: Anglican
- Established: 1915
- Cathedral: Cathedral of Ss Peter and Paul, Port Pirie
- Language: English

Current leadership
- Parent church: Anglican Church of Australia
- Bishop: Jeremy James; (since 2023)
- Metropolitan Archbishop: Geoffrey Smith; (since 2017)
- Dean: Mark Hawkes; (since 2021)

Website
- Diocese of Willochra

The Diocese of Willochra is a diocese of the Anglican Church of Australia. It is situated in the northern and western parts of the state of South Australia, Australia. As part of the Province of South Australia it covers the Eyre Peninsula, Yorke Peninsula and the towns of Coober Pedy, Port Augusta and Minlaton. The diocesan cathedral is Saints Peter and Paul Cathedral in Port Pirie. The diocese was founded in 1915, with Gilbert White installed as the first bishop. On 29 October 2022, the diocese elected Jeremy James, then assistant bishop in the Anglican Diocese of Perth, as its next bishop, replacing John Stead who retired on 2 July 2022. James was installed on 25 February 2023.

== History ==
The diocese covers over 90% of the state, mainly in northern and western South Australia. The diocese is made up of thirteen parishes and five ministry districts comprising 80 small congregations. It was created from the Diocese of Adelaide in 1915.

== Cathedral ==
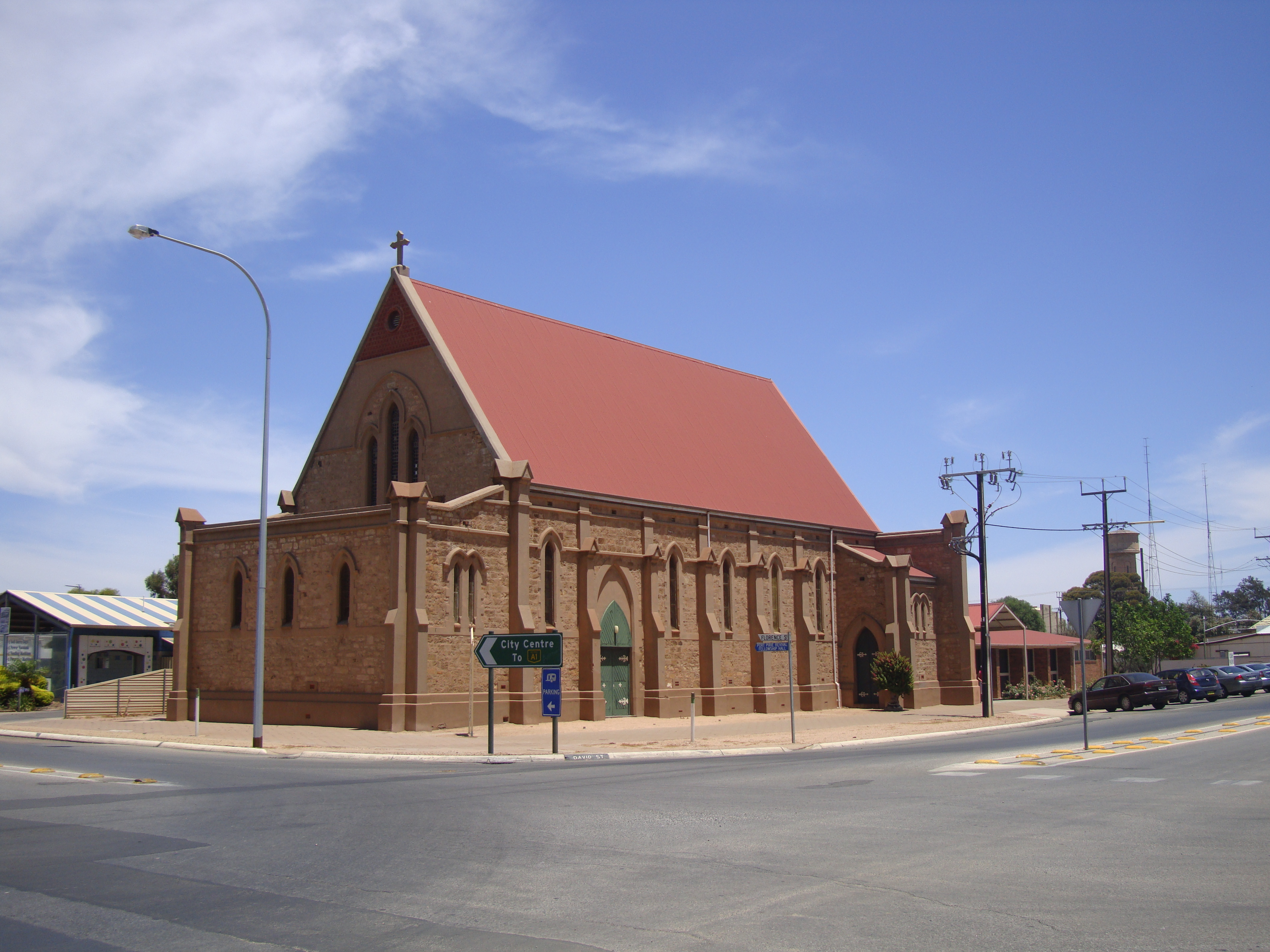
Cathedral of St Peter and St Paul

The cathedral church of the diocese is the Cathedral of Saints Peter and Paul in Port Pirie. The cathedral building was built in 1899 as a parish church and was consecrated as cathedral on 29 June 1999.

The building is constructed of dressed stone and corrugated iron roof and is furnished internally in minimalist but slightly high church style.

== Deans of Willochra ==
- 1999–2006: Peter Garland
- 2010–2015: David Amery
- 2016–2020: Mary Lewis
- 2021–present: Mark Hawkes
