= Michael Hough (bishop) =

Michael George Hough is a retired Australian Anglican bishop who served in the Anglican Church of Australia and the Anglican Church of Papua New Guinea. He had previously been a Franciscan priest in the Roman Catholic Church.

Hough was principal of Newton Theological College in Popondetta from 1993 to 1996. He then served as the Bishop of the New Guinea Islands from 1996 to 1998, Bishop of Port Moresby from 1998 to 2001 and Bishop of Ballarat from 2004 to 2010. In June 2010 he announced his decision to step down later in the year. He subsequently returned to parish ministry before retiring in 2019.

Anglican Communion titles
Preceded by Bevan Meredith	Bishop of the New Guinea Islands; 1996–1998	Succeeded by Allan Migi
Preceded by Isaac Gadebo	Bishop of Port Moresby; 1998–2001	Succeeded by Peter Fox
Preceded by David Silk	Bishop of Ballarat; 2003–2010	Succeeded by Garry Weatherill
