= Ss Peter and Paul Cathedral, Dogura =

Anglican cathedral in Dogura, Papua New Guinea

Saints Peter and Paul Cathedral
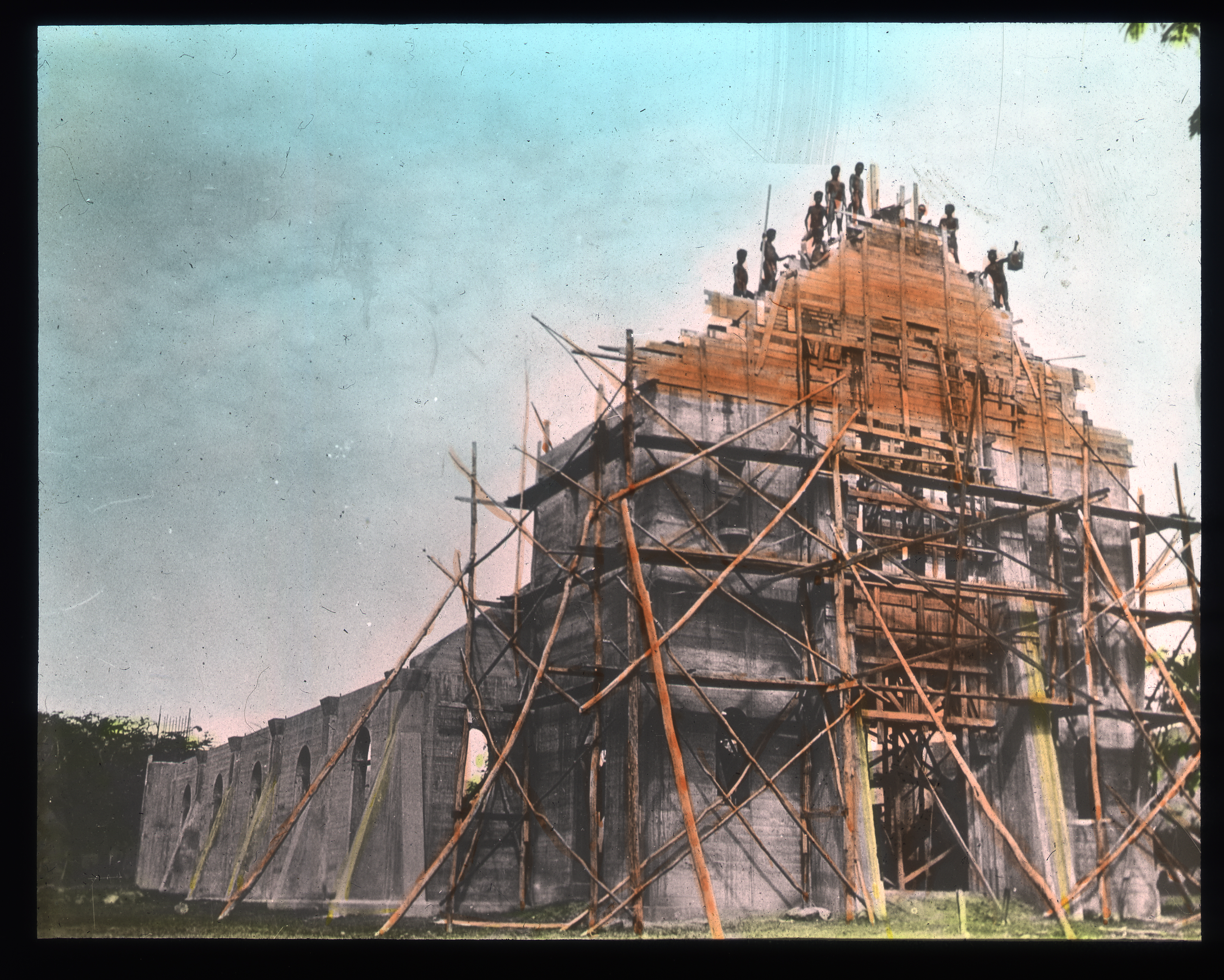
- Dogura Cathedral under construction in the 1930s
- Saints Peter and Paul Cathedral
- 10.091793°S 150.080567°E
- Location: Wedau, Milne Bay
- Country: Papua New Guinea
- Denomination: Anglican Church of Papua New Guinea

History
- Founder: Henry Newton
- Dedicated: 29 October 1939

Architecture
- Architect: Leslie Wilkinson
- Style: Romanesque Revival
- Years built: 1934–1939

Administration
- Diocese: Dogura

Clergy
- Bishop: John Alfred Dubabagi

Ss Peter and Paul Cathedral is an Anglican cathedral in Dogura, Papua New Guinea. It was consecrated in 1939, just after the outbreak of World War II. It is the seat of the Bishop of Dogura in the Anglican Church of Papua New Guinea. The Dogura diocese consists of Milne Bay Province. The cathedral is the Anglican Church of Papua New Guinea's only traditional European-style cathedral of substantial size and built of masonry. It was designed by Leslie Wilkinson and built between 1934 and 1939.

== History ==
=== History of the Dogura mission ===
In 1883 the Government of the Colony of Queensland annexed the south-eastern quarter of the island of New Guinea, which became the Territory of Papua. In 1890 the Administrator of the Territory of Papua, William MacGregor, brokered a 'comity of missions' agreement between the different Christian denominations, whereby each denomination would restrict its missionary activity to a particular area. The Church of England was given responsibility for the north-east coast of Papua from Cape Ducie to Mitre Rock, near the border with German New Guinea. The comity of missions was still in place at the time that Philip Strong was appointed bishop in 1936, although by then it was showing signs of fracture.

In 1891 two Anglican priests, the Rev Albert Maclaren and the Rev Copland King, founded the New Guinea Mission. On 10 August 1891 Maclaren and King walked ashore at the beach at Kaieta, near the village of Wedau. 60 metres above Wedau rose the Dogura plateau, a former tribal battleground, and it was here that the two priests established the Dogura mission. A small bush chapel was built. Maclaren fell ill and died in December, but King persevered. On Easter Day 1896 the first converts were baptised. This was the prompt for the creation of the Diocese of British New Guinea, and in 1898 Montagu Stone-Wigg was enthroned in Dogura as the first bishop.

When the bush chapel was replaced by a more permanent structure, it was discovered that one of the corner posts had taken root. That corner post is now a giant Modawa tree, and still stands in the cathedral complex. When the then Archbishop of Canterbury, George Carey, visited in 1991 for the Mission's centenary, he planted a sapling from the tree in Popondetta, the location of the Anglican Newton Theological College. The pro-cathedral, as it became after the creation of the diocese in 1898, was built of 'native materials' in ten days.

The mission station also included a college for mixed-race children (St Agnes', in nearby Doubina), a school (St Paul's), and a hospital (St Barnabas's); there is a nearby teachers' training college (St Aidan's).

=== Design and construction ===
A permanent cathedral was first proposed in 1932 by the then Bishop of New Guinea, Henry Newton, as an expression of emergent unity. The original design was by Leslie Wilkinson, Professor of Architecture at the University of Sydney, but was found to be too ambitious, and had to be considerably modified. The modified plan was prepared and executed by Robert Jones, a lay worker at the mission who was subsequently ordained in 1940.

The foundation stone was laid in 1934. The cathedral contains 20,000 tons of material, all of which was carried up the 220ft plateau by Papuan volunteer workers. No workers lost their lives in the construction of the cathedral.

At the time of its construction, the cathedral was the largest building in the territories of Papua & New Guinea. It is 170ft long and 50 ft wide, and longer than the Anglican cathedrals in Sydney or Melbourne. At the transepts, the width is 70 ft. The cathedral is designed in a 'Norman-Romanesque' style, with round windows and Norman arches. It has two transeptal towers, named for the double dedication of Peter and Paul, as well as to each of the two founders of the mission, Maclaren and King. The height of the cathedral is 40ft; the towers reach 64 ft.

=== Consecration and the cathedral in the life of its congregation ===
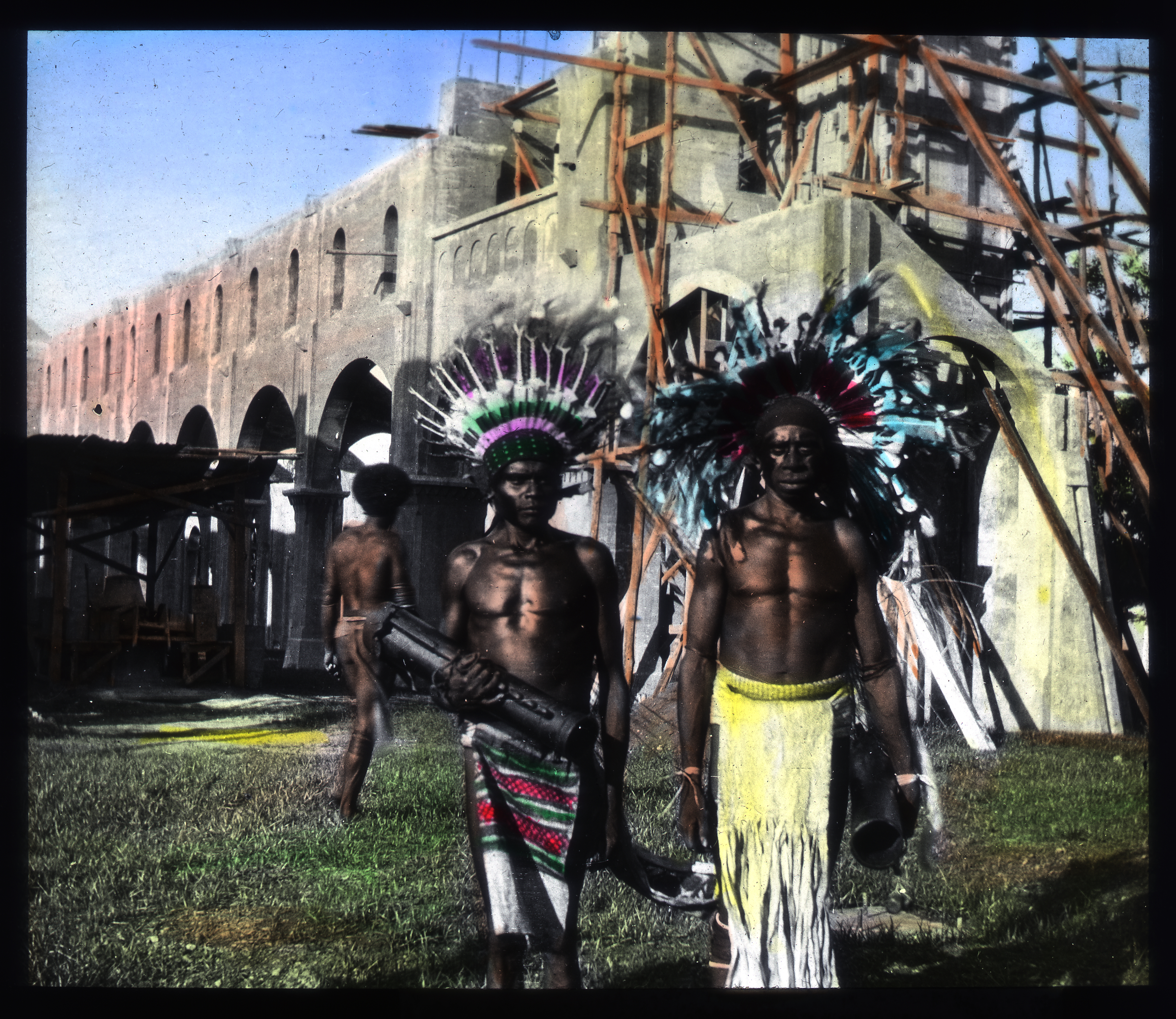
Papuans outside the cathedral during its construction in the 1930s.

The cathedral was consecrated on 29 October 1939 by William Wand, the Archbishop of Brisbane, the Diocese of New Guinea then forming part of the Province of Queensland. Wand had taught himself a little Wedauan in advance of the visit. As the diocesan boat, the Maclaren King, arrived at Wedau, the assembly of Papuans on the beach sang the hymn Now Thank We All Our God. Wand pronounced a blessing as he stepped ashore, in Wedauan, prompting three cheers from the assembled crowd.

The jubilee took place in 1941, and was celebrated on the feast of St Laurence, 10 August, with Holy Communion at 6 and 7 am, followed by Mattins at 10 am, and then the ordination of two Papuan priests.

David Hand, aged just 31, was consecrated bishop in the cathedral in 1950, to become coadjutor bishop of the then Diocese of New Guinea: this was the first episcopal consecration held at Dogura. The noted Papuan linguist, the Rev Dr Arthur Capell, was made an Honorary Canon of the cathedral in 1956.

=== Disrepair ===
The cathedral was restored in the early 1970s. Since at least 2017, the Cathedral has been suffering from white ant and termite infestation.

== Architecture ==
=== Features ===
There are no pews: the congregation sits and kneels on the floor. There are other local features. In 1939 the incense was from gum from trees, the oil in the sanctuary lamps was from coconuts, and the charcoal from mangrove wood.

At the time of the consecration there were four windows: St George in the Baptistry; St Paul in the Chapel of the Resurrection; the Resurrection in the same chapel; and a circular window of the Nativity in the Lady Chapel. The installation of the other windows was delayed by the European war, but were subsequently installed: a window of St Laurence (being the feast day on which Maclaren and King landed at Wedau) and a window of St Peter. Other features installed by 1940 included a bronze sanctuary lamp, standard candlesticks made of Australian blackwood given by St Peter's, Eastern Hill, and a tabernacle for reservation of the Blessed Sacrament.

A number of Anglican clergy and lay workers were murdered by the invading Japanese in WWII, north of Dogura in 1942. Two of those were in Gona; a third, Fr James Benson, narrowly escaped death, but was presumed killed, until he stumbled out of the jungle in 1945. As a memorial to all of those who died at the hands of the Japanese, known as the Martyrs of New Guinea, Benson painted a mural on the east end of the Sanctuary of the cathedral. Benson's mural collapsed in 2017, and is stored on the floor, awaiting funding for restoration.

== Depictions ==
- In 1946 the Australian stained glass artist Napier Waller created a New Guinea Martyrs Memorial Window for St Peter's, Eastern Hill in Melbourne. The uppermost panel depicts Dogura cathedral on the day of its consecration.
- To commemorate the centenary of the Anglican Church in Papua New Guinea in 1991, the PNG post office issued three stamps. The 21 toea stamp depicts Dogura cathedral.

== Sub-Deans and Deans ==
Initially the incumbent was the Sub-Dean (the Bishop being the Dean); since 1968 the incumbent has been the Dean.

- John Dewhurst Bodger, 1940-50 Bodger was a member of the Legislative Council for the Territory of Papua (the predecessor of the Legislative Council of Papua and New Guinea) from 1940.
- Harold Ernest Palmer, 1950-54
- John Wallace Chisholm, 1954-64. Subsequently Bishop of Melanesia, 1967-75 and briefly Archbishop of Melanesia, 1975.
- Ian Robert Lovell, 1965-69.
- Wallace Kibikibi, 1969-
- Rhynold Ewaruba Sanana, 1974-77. Sanana was concurrently an Assistant Bishop of New Guinea 1976-77 and subsequently Bishop of Dogura, 1977-90.
- ?
- Faithful Arewa, c 2020
