= Anglican Church of Papua New Guinea =

Province of the Anglican Communion

- Arms
- Classification: Protestant
- Orientation: Anglican
- Scripture: Holy Bible
- Theology: Anglican doctrine
- Polity: Episcopal
- Primate: Nathan Ingen (acting)
- Language: English and Pidgin
- Headquarters: Lae, Morobe Province
- Territory: Papua New Guinea
- Origin: 27 February 1977; Dogura Cathedral
- Members: c. 230,000
- Official website: acpng.org.pg

The Anglican Church of Papua New Guinea is a province of the Anglican Communion. It was created in 1977 when the Province of Papua New Guinea became independent from the Province of Queensland in the Church of England in Australia (officially renamed the Anglican Church of Australia in 1981) following Papua New Guinea's independence in 1975.

== History ==
=== Founding ===
Britain assumed sovereignty over southeast New Guinea in 1888 and the General Synod of the Church of England in Australia (now the Anglican Church of Australia) then resolved that "the recent annexation of portion of New Guinea imposes direct obligation upon the Church to provide for the spiritual welfare both of the natives and the settlers." In 1889, A. A. Maclaren was appointed the first Anglican missionary to the region and in 1890 visited with Copland King. They purchased land at Samarai for a mission station but Maclaren died at the end of 1891 and King withdrew to Australia; in 1892 King returned to Dogura and built a mission house and two South Sea Islands teachers joined him in 1893 and were placed at Taupota and Awaiama; in 1894 a teacher was placed at Boiani. In 1898 Montagu John Stone-Wigg was appointed Bishop of New Guinea and spent ten years there, establishing stations at Wanigela and Mukawa on Collingwood Bay in 1898 and Mamba at the mouth of the Mambare River in 1899: by 1901 there were eleven stations along the coast of north Papua (in what are now Northern (Oro) and Milne Bay Provinces) and Anglican influence had extended along 480 kilometres (480,000 m) of the coast.

Ss Peter and Paul Cathedral in Dogura, Milne Bay Province, is the largest Anglican church in Papua New Guinea. It seats 800, was consecrated in 1939 three years before the outbreak of war in the South Pacific and survived the traumatic Japanese occupation of Papua New Guinea during World War II.

=== Second World War and recovery ===
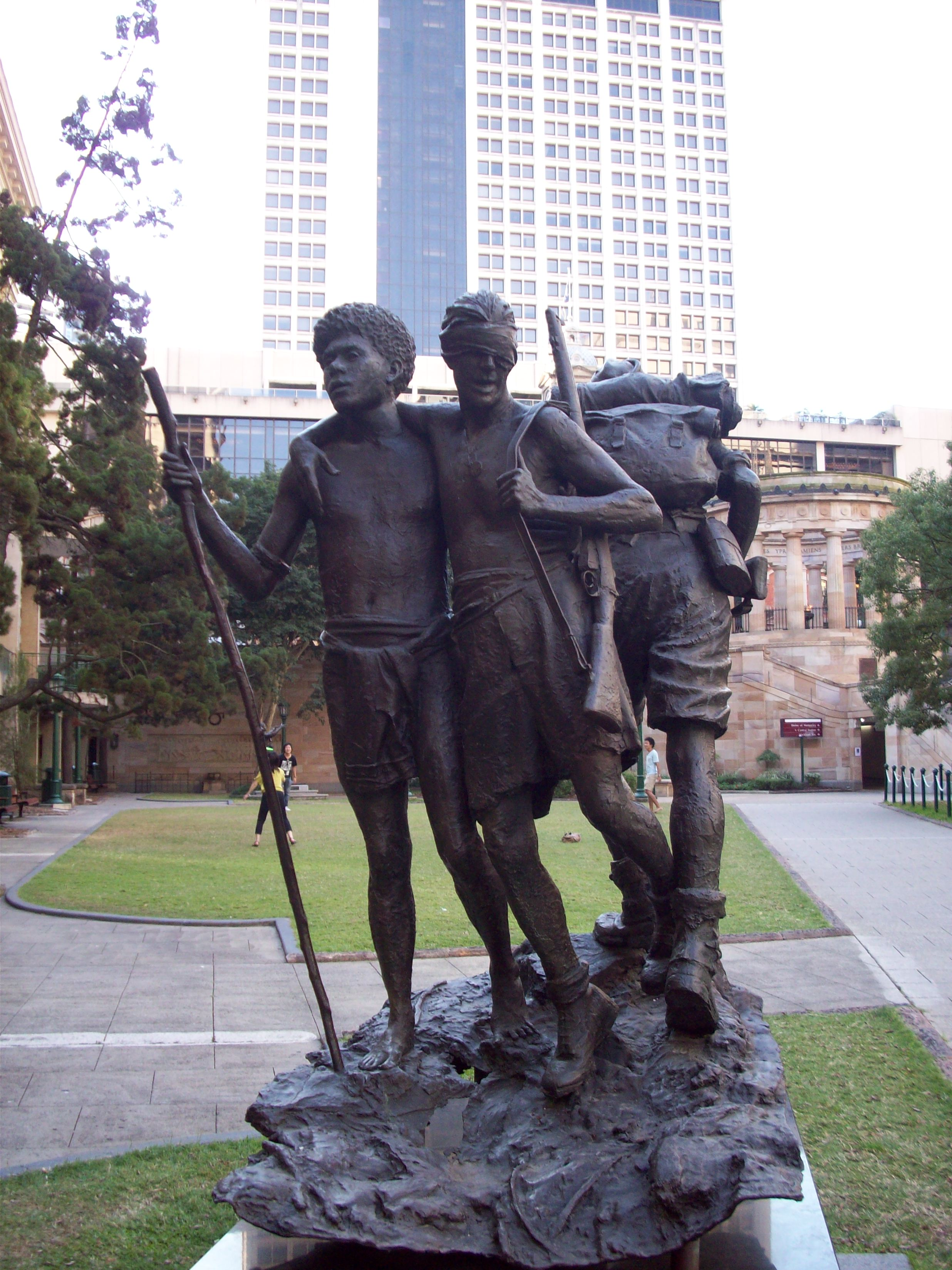
Statue in Brisbane, Australia of Raphael Aimbari, an Oro man, leading a blinded Australian soldier during the New Guinea Campaign

The Japanese had put ashore troops in Papua near Gona by July 1942 with a view to taking Lae and Salamaua. The Japanese did not harass or occupy Dogura mission itself and services continued in the cathedral throughout the war, with congregations amply enlarged by visitors from the Australian and American armed forces. However, the Anglican Church elsewhere fared less well. In Anglican terminology the Martyrs of New Guinea were eight Anglican clergy, teachers and medical missionaries killed by the Japanese in 1942, the Anglican Bishop of New Guinea (then still a diocese of the ecclesiastical Province of Queensland) Philip Strong (Bishop from 1936 to 1962) having instructed Anglican missionaries to remain at their posts despite the Japanese invasion. Three hundred thirty-three church workers of various denominations were killed during the Japanese occupation of New Guinea.

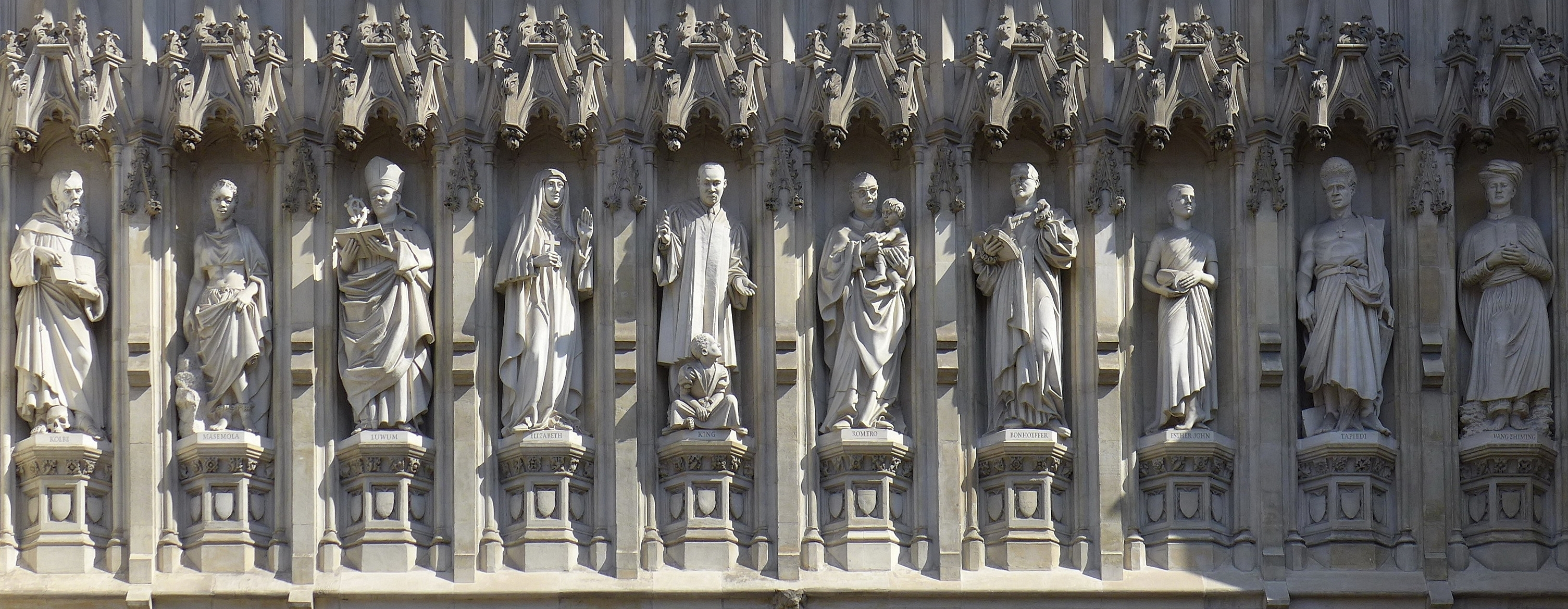
The 20th-century Christian martyrs, Westminster Abbey

A statue of Lucian Tapiedi, the one indigenous Papuan among the Anglican martyrs of New Guinea, is installed among the niches with other 20th-century Christian martyrs, over the west door of Westminster Abbey in London. The statue of Lucian Tapiedi stands second from right.

The Martyrs of Papua New Guinea are remembered in the Church of England with a commemoration on 2 September.

Postwar recovery was hindered by the 21 January 1951 eruption of Mount Lamington, which devastated Higatura, which contained the Martyrs' School and the main mission centre, where a diocesan synod was in progress — both were destroyed — and Sangara, the Northern District Headquarters, where everyone was killed.

Martyrs' School was subsequently re-established at Popondetta, where its eponym for obvious reasons came generally to refer to the hundreds of victims of the Mount Lamington eruption who died precisely because they were involved in church work at the time of the eruption.

=== Present ===
Since it was historically part of the ecclesiastical province of Queensland, the Anglican Board of Mission - Australia (ABM-A; previously the Australian Board of Missions) has provided ongoing personnel and material support to the church. Today that support takes the form of funding for theological training, ministry, evangelism and building the church's capacity for community development and enhanced provision of vital social services such as education and health, including HIV/AIDS.

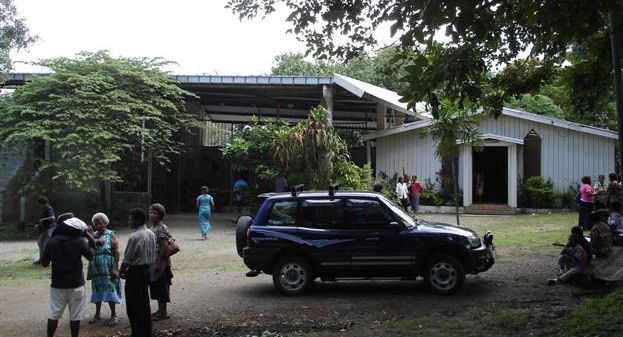
St Martin's Church, Boroko, Port Moresby

The Anglican mission was not well funded in years past and it did not compare favourably with other Christian denominations in Papua New Guinea in terms of health and education services. Roman Catholic, Lutheran, Congregational and Methodist missions elsewhere in the country established plantations and other commercial enterprises by way of funding mission activities and were able to recruit Polynesian mission staff from elsewhere in the South Pacific. The Anglican mission, centred in Oro and Milne Bay, which were in early years less amenable to commercial enterprise and without a substantial mission presence elsewhere in the South Pacific, lacked these resources and depended on mission funds and personnel in Australia and England.

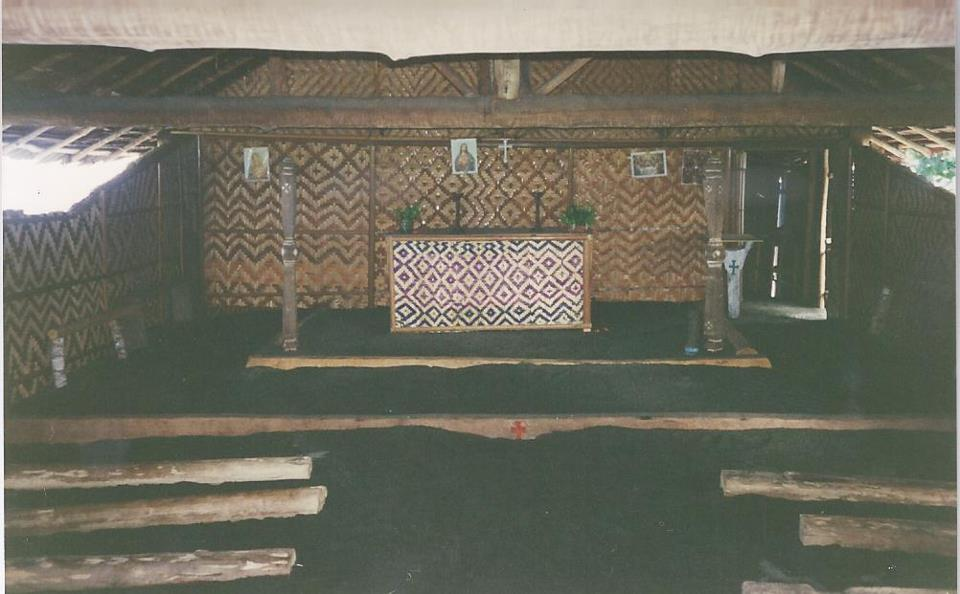
Coastal village Anglican church in Oro (Northern) Province

There are two church-affiliated high schools, Martyrs' Memorial School in Popondetta, Northern (Oro) and Province and Holy Name School in Dogura, Milne Bay Province, and numerous primary schools in Northern and Milne Bay Provinces.

The church operates Newton Theological College, a theological seminary for the training of clergy in Popondetta and, in co-operation with the Evangelical Lutheran Church of Papua New Guinea and the Gutnius Lutheran Church (i.e. Lutheran Church, Missouri Synod), Balob Teachers' College in Lae.

== Membership ==
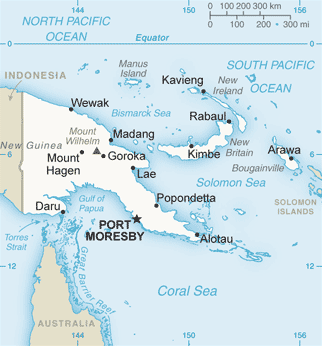
Papua New Guinea

In accordance with early concordats among European missionaries by which they agreed not to engage in undue competition with each other, Anglican missionary activity was largely confined to the Northern and Milne Bay Districts of Papua; the Oro (Northern) Province remains the only civil province of Papua New Guinea of which a majority of the population are Anglican.

There are pockets of Anglicans in the Western Highlands (and James Ayong, Archbishop of Aipo-Rongo — Mount Hagen — was the former primate), in the western extremity of West New Britain and of course, significantly, in Port Moresby where the core constituency of Oro and Wedau people is supplemented by foreign residents of the city.

== Australian bishops ==
Prior to 1977, when Papua New Guinea was a diocese of the (Church of England in Australia) Queensland Province, the bishops of New Guinea included:

- Montagu John Stone-Wigg, (1898–1908)
- Gerald Sharp, (1910–1921)
- Henry Newton, (1922–1936)
- Sir Philip Strong, (1936–1962)
- David Hand, (1963–1977; Hand had previously been Strong's coadjutor since 1950). As diocesan bishop, Hand had assistant bishops: George Ambo (from 1960 onwards), John Chisholm (1964–1967), Bevan Meredith (consecrated 26 February 1967), Henry Kendall (consecrated 24 February 1968), Jeremy Ashton (consecrated 2 May 1976) and Rhynold Sanana (consecrated 9 May 1976).

At the creation of the independent province in 1977, the one Diocese of New Guinea was divided in five; Hand became Bishop of Port Moresby and also became the first archbishop.

== Archbishops ==
The first archbishop and Primate of Papua New Guinea was David Hand, the last Australian bishop. Succeeding primates also retained their diocesan sees until the consecration of Joseph Kopapa, who was primate from 2010 to 2012. Before his election to the primacy, Kopapa was Bishop of Popondota — but, prior to the primatial election, it was decided that the primate would have no diocesan responsibilities and would take on a solely national role. The last archbishop, Archbishop Migi, was acting diocesan bishop of the islands during a vacancy in See. after Archbishop Migi's resignation in May 2020 due to ill health (and later died in October 2020.). Senior Bishop Nathan Ingen became Primate (Acting) on 11 May, 2022 till present.

- 1977 – 1983 (ret.): David Hand, Bishop of Port Moresby
- 1983 – 1989 (ret.): George Ambo, Bishop of Popondetta
- 1989 – 1995 (ret.): Bevan Meredith, Bishop of the New Guinea Islands (1977–ret.)
- 1996 – 2009 (ret.): James Ayong, Bishop of Aipo-Rongo (1995–2009)
- 2010 – 2012 (ret.): Joseph Kopapa (non-diocesan)
- 2013 – 2017 (ret.): Clyde Igara (non-diocesan)
- 2017 – 2020 (ret.): Allan Migi (non-diocesan; caretaker Bishop of the New Guinea Islands)
- 2022 –present: Nathan Ingen (Acting Primate; Bishop of Aipo Rongo Diocese)

== Diocesan structure ==
The Archbishop of Papua New Guinea is both metropolitan and primate. The polity of the Anglican Church of Papua New Guinea is episcopalian, as with all Anglican churches. The church maintains a system of geographical parishes organised into dioceses. There are five dioceses, each headed by a bishop.

There are no metropolitical dioceses as such and the primate and Archbishop of Papua New Guinea may be any one of the five diocesan bishops, who concurrently retains his designation as bishop of his diocese. (Unlike in some other Anglican provinces, all clergy and bishops are male.)

The dioceses are:

=== Diocese of Port Moresby ===
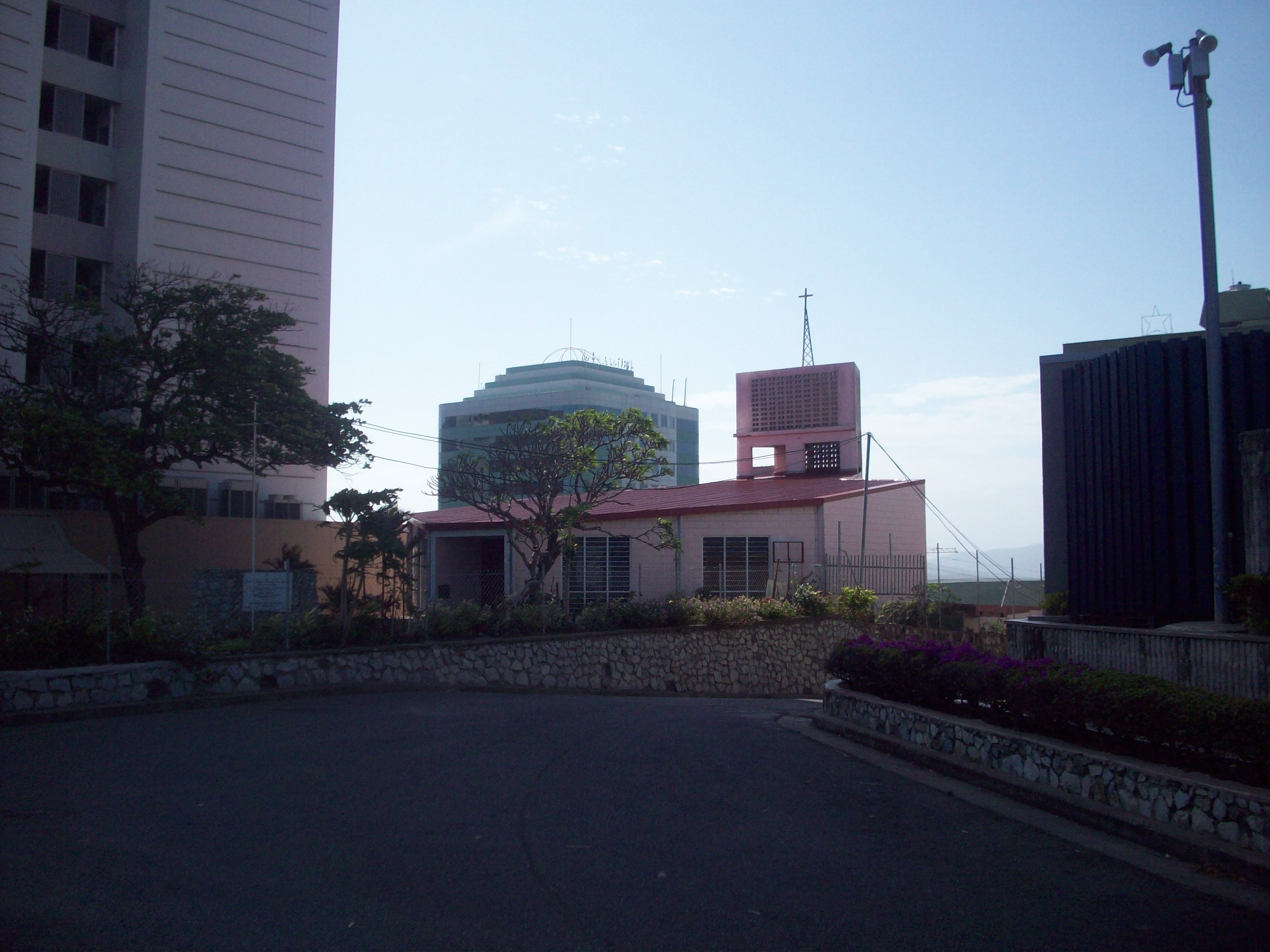
St John's Cathedral, Port Moresby, 2013

The Diocese of Port Moresby (initially called the Diocese of Southern Papua) includes the entirety of Papua (i.e. the former British New Guinea, the southeastern quarter of the island of New Guinea) apart from Milne Bay and Northern (Oro) provinces. Her cathedral is at St John's, Port Moresby

Bishops:

- 1977–1983: David Hand (Archbishop; diocese aka "Southern Papua")
- 1983–1997: Isaac Gadebo (elected May 1983)
- 1998–2001: Michael Hough
- 2002–2006: Peter Fox
- 2007–2014: Peter Ramsden (consecrated 25 March 2007)
- 2015–10 August 2019: Denny Guka (consecrated 24 May 2015 at St Martin's, Boroko; removed from Holy Orders 10 August 2019)
- 2024–present: Wilfred Kekea (Bishop Elect; yet to be consecrated)

=== Diocese of Popondota ===
The Diocese of Popondota has its see at the Cathedral of the Resurrection, Popondetta; its territory is the Northern (Oro) Province.

Bishops:

- 1977–1989: George Ambo (since 1977) — first indigenous Papua New Guinean bishop (assistant bishop of New Guinea, 1960–1977; Archbishop, 1983–1989)
- 1990–?: Walter Siba
- 1995–1 June 2002: Reuben Tariambari
- 2003–2005: Roger Jupp (elected 31 December 2002)
- 2006–2010: Joe Kopapa (elected 10 October 2005)
- 2010–present: Lindsley Ihove

=== Diocese of Dogura ===
Milne Bay Province makes up the Dogura diocese; Dogura itself is the location of the Cathedral of Ss Peter and Paul, the Anglican Church of Papua New Guinea's only traditional European-style cathedral of substantial size and built of masonry, which was consecrated on 29 October 1939.

Bishops:

- 1977–1990: Rhynold Sanana
- ?-1992 Blake Kerina
- 1992–2009: Tevita Talanoa
- 2010–2013: Mervin Clyde Igara
- 2014–2023: Tennyson Bogar
- 2024–present: John Dubabagi

=== Diocese of Aipo Rongo ===
The diocese has its see city in Mount Hagen, Western Highlands Province.

Bishops:

- 1977–1986: Jeremy Ashton
  - 10 August 1980 – ?: Blake Kerina, assistant bishop
- 1987–1995: Paul Richardson
- 1995–2009: James Ayong (archbishop, 1996 onwards)
- 25 April 2010–present: Nathan Ingen (acting Archbishop since 2022)

=== Diocese of the New Guinea Islands ===
The diocese's see city was formerly in Rabaul, though since Rabaul's destruction by volcanic eruption in 1992 the de facto see city has become Kokopo, ENB.

Now the Diocese is currently located at Kimbe, West New Britain Province

Bishops:

- 1977–1995: Bevan Meredith (archbishop, 1990 onwards)
- 1996–1998: Michael Hough
- 2000–2020: Allan Migi (archbishop and caretaker diocesan bishop from 2017–2020)
- 2021–present: Reginald Makele

== Worship and liturgy ==
Liturgical translations into local languages, such as Wedau, Ubir, Mukawa and Binandere, were an early part of the first missionaries' work. Today, a local variant of the Book of Common Prayer is used in the simplified English of the Good News Bible and with similar illustrations. A conundrum for the church has been the question of an appropriate common liturgical language in the Papua New Guinean environment of radical, even extreme, multiculturalism. New Guinea Pidgin is an official language of the country and is spoken and understood by more Papua New Guineans than any other, but it is little known in the Anglican heartland of Oro and Milne Bay Provinces. An anglophone Anglican Church of Papua New Guinea hymn book was published in the early 1980s which contains a strictly limited number of hymns from a variety of traditions.

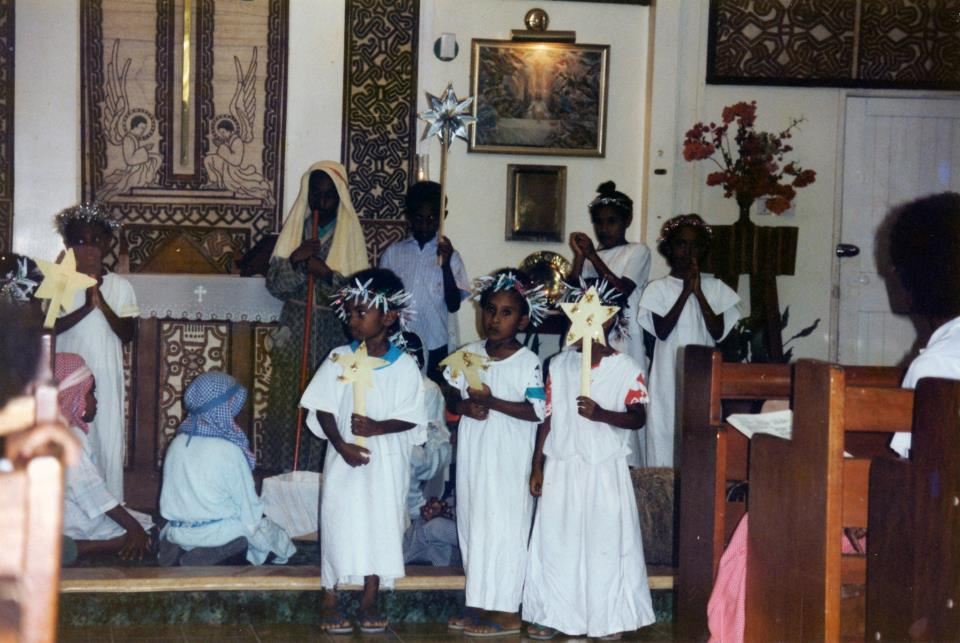
Christmas pageant in a Port Moresby Anglican church mid-1990s

The churchmanship of the province, as demonstrated by the Papua New Guinea Prayer Book, is Anglo-Catholic: the normative Sunday service is the Eucharist, commonly referred to as "Mass"; Mattins is virtually unknown; clergy are addressed as "Father" (there are no women clergy). Religious orders — the Melanesian Brothers and the Anglican Franciscans — play a considerable role in the life of the church. Oro tapa cloth is a characteristic feature of church decoration and liturgical vestments, as befits a denomination substantially characterised by Oro people, and church festivals are often marked by congregants appearing in traditional Oro dress, with Oro drumming and singing.

== Ecumenical relations ==
The Anglican Church of Papua New Guinea participates in the Melanesian Council of Churches and despite the obviously closer social and religious ties of overseas Anglicans with overseas equivalents of the United Church maintains especially close ties with the Evangelical Lutheran and Roman Catholic churches.

With both the Lutherans and Roman Catholics the Anglican Church of Papua New Guinea has entered into formal mutual recognition of baptism and Anglican Papua New Guineans seeking membership in the Roman Catholic Church therefore not submit to conditional baptism as in some other parts of the world. However, unlike the Roman Catholics, the Anglican Church of Papua New Guinea practises open communion and as in many other national Anglican bodies worldwide, baptised Christians of other traditions — typically spouses of Anglican Papua New Guineans, but also foreign residents of Papua New Guinea — are welcome to participate fully in the life of the church, including communicating at Mass, without being required to obtain episcopal confirmation.
