= Peter Fox (bishop) =

British priest (born 1952)

The Right Reverend Peter Fox
- Honorary Assistant Bishop
- Diocese: Diocese of Leicester
- Installed: August 2019
- Other posts: Bishop of Port Moresby (Papua New Guinea; 2002–2006); Priest-in-Charge and Vicar of the Lakenham Group (2006–2018); Honorary assistant bishop, Diocese of Norwich (2006–2018)

Orders
- Ordination: 1975 (deacon); 1976 (priest)
- Consecration: 24 February 2002

Personal details
- Born: 1952 (age 73–74)
- Denomination: Anglican
- Spouse: Angie
- Children: 3
- Education: King's College London

Peter John Fox (born 1952) is a British priest in the Church of England who served as Bishop of Port Moresby in the Anglican Church of Papua New Guinea from 2002 to 2006, as an honorary assistant bishop in the Diocese of Norwich between 2006 and 2018, and since August 2019 an honorary assistant bishop in the Diocese of Leicester.

== Biography ==
Fox attended King's College London, becoming an Associate (AKC) in 1974 and spending his fourth and final year of ministerial training at St Augustine's College, Canterbury. He was then ordained a deacon at Petertide (29 June) 1975 by Maurice Wood, Bishop of Norwich, at Norwich Cathedral and a priest the following Petertide (27 June 1976) by Aubrey Aitken, Bishop of Lynn, at the same cathedral. He served his title (curacy) at Wymondham, Norfolk until 1979, when he went as a missionary priest to Papua New Guinea, where he served as Rector of Gerehu from 1980 and additionally as Diocesan Secretary for the Diocese of Port Moresby from 1984.

He returned to the UK in 1985, taking a group of rural Norfolk parishes: East and West Rudham, Syderstone, Bagthorpe, Barmer, Tatterford, Tattersett and Houghton (Note: Fox's immediate predecessor as priest-in-charge of the Coxford parishes was David Hand, former Archbishop of Papua New Guinea, who had grown up in Tatterford and served these parishes after resigning his archiepiscopate, 1983–1985.) (which became the Coxford Group in 1988); until 1989. He then moved to Devon and became Team Rector of Lynton, Barbrook, Countisbury, Lynmouth, Brendon, Martinhoe and Parracombe until 1995, serving additionally as Rural Dean of Shirwell from 1992. From Devon he moved to Oxfordshire, where he was Priest-in-Charge at Harpsden-cum-Bolney, serving concurrently as General Secretary of the Melanesian Mission. He was elected to become Bishop of Port Moresby, in the Anglican Church of Papua New Guinea, in September 2001.

Fox was consecrated and installed on 24 February 2002; he served until 2006. That year, he returned to Britain, becoming Priest-in-Charge of the Lakenham Group of churches (North Lakenham and Tuckswood; becoming Vicar in 2007) and (additionally) an honorary assistant bishop in the Diocese of Norwich. In 2019 Bishop Martyn Snow appointed him an honorary assistant bishop in the Diocese of Leicester.

== Notes ==
Anglican Communion titles
Preceded by Michael Hough	Bishop of Port Moresby; 2002–2006	Succeeded by Peter Ramsden
