= Bevan Meredith =

Former Anglican bishop in Papua New Guinea

The Most Reverend Bevan Meredith
- Archbishop of Papua New Guinea
- Church: Anglican Church of Papua New Guinea
- See: New Guinea Islands (1977–1995)
- In office: 1990–1995
- Other post: Assistant Bishop of New Guinea (1967–1977)

Orders
- Ordination: 1961 deacon, 1962 priest by Philip Strong
- Consecration: 1967

Personal details
- Born: 14 August 1927 Alstonville, New South Wales, Australia
- Died: 17 December 2019 (aged 92) Brisbane, Australia

Bevan Stanley Meredith (14 August 1927 – 17 December 2019) was an Anglican clergyman in Australia and Papua New Guinea who was Bishop of the New Guinea Islands (1977–1995) and Archbishop of Papua New Guinea (1990–1995).

== Early life ==
Meredith was born in 1927, the son of Stanley Meredith, who was a teacher, and his wife Edith (née Witchard).

He was educated at Towalbyn Public School in Uralba and Ballina High School. In 1945 the family moved to Mango Hill in Queensland. Initially working on the family farm, he then became a clerk at the City Electric Light Company. Meredith then became a teacher, initially at a small Anglican school called St Christopher's in Brookfield, which had been established by Fr Robert Bates, Rector of All Saints, Wickham Terrace, Brisbane.

From 1948 he taught at the Slade School in Warwick, before moving to Papua & New Guinea in 1954 to teach at the Martyrs School in Popondetta. This was only three years after the Mount Lamington volcanic eruption which destroyed the school, and at the time it was still being rebuilt.

== Career ==
Meredith trained for ordination at St Francis' Theological College, Brisbane and was ordained deacon in 1961 and priest in 1962. He served a short curacy at St Thomas', Toowong in the Diocese of Brisbane from 1961 to 1962 and then returned to Papua & New Guinea as a missionary in the Papuan Peninsula from 1962 to 1966. He was then Archdeacon of New Guinea from 1966 to 1967.

He was consecrated a bishop in 1967 and became an assistant bishop of New Guinea, as well as being Archdeacon of the New Guinea Islands. In 1968 he was appointed an Australian Army chaplain (Papua & New Guinea then being an Australian territory).

As late as 1970, Meredith was still finding communities of Papuans in the Highlands for whom Christianity was novel, and he was the first to baptise any of them. In 1977 he became Bishop of the New Guinea Islands, and in 1990 additionally Archbishop of Papua New Guinea. He survived the volcanic eruption in Rabaul in 1994, and retired in 1995. Meredith was a Franciscan tertiary.

== Personal life ==
In retirement Meredith lived in Brisbane. He died in 2019, aged 92, and his funeral was at St John's Cathedral in Brisbane. He was unmarried. His sister Marion married the Rt Rev George Tung Yep.

Anglican Communion titles
Preceded by George Ambo	Archbishop of Papua New Guinea; 1990–1995	Succeeded by James Ayong
