= Newton Theological College =

Anglican theological college in Papua New Guinea

Newton Theological College is a Papua New Guinean educational institution in Popondetta, Papua New Guinea. It trains candidates for ordination in the Anglican Church of Papua New Guinea.

== History ==
Anglican mission activity commenced in the Territory of Papua in 1891. Theological training was taking place in Dogura at least as early as 1918.

Originally located in Dogura, the base of the New Guinea Mission and the seat of the Bishop of New Guinea, Ss Peter and Paul Cathedral, Dogura, the college moved to Popondetta some years after the Mount Lamington volcanic eruption in 1951 as part of the rebuilding efforts. It was still located in Dogura in 1970.

In 1972 there was a proposal to relocate the college to near to the University of Papua New Guinea in Port Moresby. The proposal was still under active consideration in 1975. Instead it moved to Popondetta in 1981.

The college was originally named St Aidan's Theological College (along with the teacher training college, subsequently moved to Lae). It was separated from the teacher training college and renamed after the Rt Rev Henry Newton after his death in 1947.

Until 1977 the Anglican Church of Papua New Guinea was the Diocese of New Guinea (renamed the Diocese of Papua New Guinea in 1971) and part of the Province of Queensland in what was then called the Church of England in Australia.

The college is supported financially by ABM-Australia.

== Notable staff ==
- James Ayong, Principal, later Archbishop of Papua New Guinea
- Eric Lefroy Cassidy (formerly CA), Warden 1952-70
- Sister Margaret Dewey SSM
- Jeffrey Driver, acting Principal following retirement as Archbishop of Adelaide
- Robin Gill, theologian
- Michael Hough, Principal 1993-96, later Bishop of New Guinea Islands, Port Moresby, and Ballarat
- Roger Jupp, Principal 2000-2003, later Bishop of Popondetta
- Joseph Kopapa, acting Principal, 1999, later Bishop of Popondetta and Archbishop of Papua New Guinea
- Paul Richardson, Principal, later Bishop of Wangaratta
- Walter Siba, Principal, later Bishop of Ysabel

== Notable alumni ==
- George Ambo, first Papuan to be an Anglican bishop
- James Ayong, Archbishop of Papua New Guinea
- Clyde Igara, Archbishop of Papua New Guinea
- Rhynold Sanana, Bishop of Dogura
