= Nathan Ingen =

Papuan Anglican bishop

The Right Reverend Nathan Ingen
- Bishop of Aipo Rongo
- Church: Anglican Church of Papua New Guinea
- Diocese: Aipo Rongo
- In office: 2010–present
- Predecessor: James Ayong

Nathan Ingen is a Papuan Anglican bishop. Since 2010, he has been bishop of the Diocese of Aipo Rongo in the Anglican Church of Papua New Guinea, and since 2020, as the senior diocesan bishop he has served as interim primate of the church.

== Acting primacy ==
Ingen became acting primate on 11 May 2020, when Allan Migi stepped down due to ill health. In response to the COVID-19 pandemic, he urged all Papuan Anglicans to get vaccinated.

Within the Anglican Communion, Ingen has attended the 2008 and 2022 Lambeth Conferences convened by the Archbishop of Canterbury; However, in 2024 he declined to attend the Primates' Meeting, instead visiting churches in the Anglican Diocese of Sydney, where a priest described his diocese as being "in fellowship with Gafcon global Anglicans."

== See also ==
- Anglican Church of Papua New Guinea

Anglican Communion titles
Preceded by James Ayong	Anglican Bishop of Aipo Rongo; 2010–present	Incumbent
