= Roger Jupp =

British Anglican bishop (born 1956)

The Right Reverend Roger Jupp SSC
- Vicar of St. Laurence's Church, Long Eaton
- Church: Church of England
- Province: Canterbury
- Diocese: Derby
- Other posts: Bishop of Popondota (2002-05)

Orders
- Ordination: 1980 (deacon); 1981 (priest)
- Consecration: 23 February 2003

Personal details
- Born: Roger Alan Jupp; 1956 (age 69–70) London, UK
- Spouse: Sue Cheetham
- Education: University of Oxford

Roger Alan Jupp SSC (born 1956) is a British Anglican bishop. He was the Bishop of Popondota from 2003 to 2005. He returned to parish ministry because of ill-health.

== Early life ==
Jupp was born in London and brought up in Blackheath. He was educated at Haberdashers' Aske's Hatcham Boys' Grammar School (1968–74), St Edmund Hall, Oxford (BA Theology 1978, MA 1982), St Mary's University, Twickenham (PGCE 1996), and Chichester Theological College (1979-80). Since his time at the University of Oxford he has been interested in the history of the Church of England in the nineteenth century.

Between Oxford and commencing his training for ordination he worked as a nursing auxiliary at St Christopher's Hospice in Sydenham.

== Ordained ministry ==
He was ordained deacon in 1980 and priest in 1981 and served as assistant curate of Newbold with Dunston (1980–83), Cowley St John (1983–85) and Islington St James with St Philip (1985–86).

He was Vicar of Lower Beeding (1986–90) and domestic chaplain to the Area Bishop of Horsham, Ivor Colin Docker (1986–91). He then became Vicar of Burgess Hill St John (1990–93) and Team Rector of Burgess Hill St John with St Edward (1993–94).

Due to the Church of England's decision to ordain women to the priesthood, Jupp spent the years 1994-97 in the Roman Catholic Church, training as a teacher at Saint Mary's College, University of Surrey (1995–96). He returned to the Church of England in 1997, receiving permission to officiate in the Diocese of Chichester and becoming assistant curate of Aldwick (1998-2000).

His friendship with the Most Reverend James Ayong, Archbishop of Papua New Guinea, led to Jupp's appointment as Principal of Newton Theological College, Popondetta, Oro Province, Papua New Guinea in 2000.

Throughout his stipendiary ministry he had been a member of the Ecumenical Society of the Blessed Virgin Mary (and a member of its council), the Society of the Holy Cross, the Church Union and the Confraternity of the Blessed Sacrament.

=== Episcopal ministry ===
In 2003, Jupp was elected Bishop of Popondota. On 23 February 2003, he was consecrated a bishop in Resurrection Cathedral, Papua New Guinea. The following year he was diagnosed with a serious heart condition requiring a triple bypass and ill health forced his resignation in 2005.

In 2005, Jupp returned to the Diocese of Chichester, and served as Priest-in-Charge of Christ Church, St Leonards-on-Sea. He was made Rector of the parish in 2006. He was also made an Honorary Assistant Bishop between 2005 and 2012. From 2012 until 2018, he was Vicar of St. Laurence's Church, Long Eaton and Priest-in-Charge of Holy Trinity Church, Ilkeston; both in the Diocese of Derby. The Bishop of Derby did not however grant him a position as Honorary Assistant Bishop. He took early retirement in November 2018 on health grounds.

Jupp was also the Superior-General of the Confraternity of the Blessed Sacrament, a post he held for eight years, and was also a member of the Council of Bishops of The Society until he retired in 2018.
