= Denny Guka =

Former Anglican bishop in Papua New Guinea

- Former Bishop of Port Moresby
- Church: Anglican Church of Papua New Guinea
- Diocese: Port Moresby
- In office: 24 May 2015–10 August 2019
- Other posts: Anglican Chaplain, University of Papua New Guinea (until 2015)

Orders
- Consecration: 24 May 2015 by Clyde Igara
- Laicized: 10 August 2019

Personal details
- Born: 1961 or 1962 (age 64–65) Ambasi, Oro Province, Papua New Guinea
- Denomination: Anglican
- Spouse: Marinda Guka
- Children: 4

Denny Bray Guka (born 1961 or 1962) is a former Anglican Papua New Guinean priest and bishop who served as Bishop of Port Moresby in the Anglican Church of Papua New Guinea from 24 May 2015 to 10 August 2019. On 10 August 2019 he was removed from holy orders by the Church's House of Bishops after being found guilty of misconduct by the Church Provincial Court of the Anglican Church of Papua New Guinea.

Anglican Communion titles
Preceded by Peter Ramsden	Bishop of Port Moresby; 2015–2019	Succeeded by TBC
