= Akikaze massacre =

1943 massacre by the Japanese navy on board the destroyer Akikaze

- Part of the Pacific War and hell ships
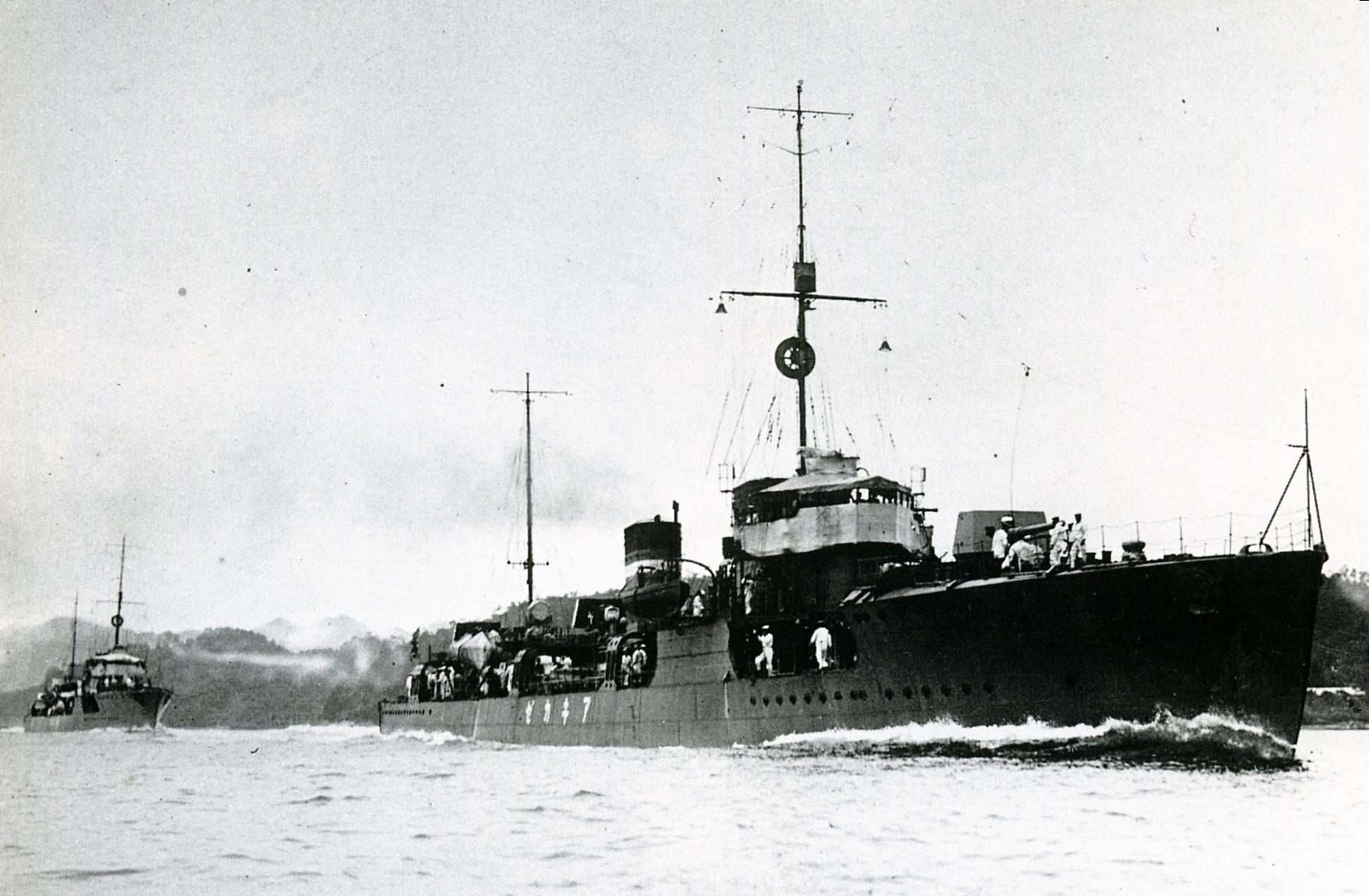
- The destroyer Akikaze departing Yokosuka, 1923
- Location: Japanese destroyer Akikaze, at the Bismarck Archipelago
- Date: March 18, 1943
- Attack type: Mass murder
- Deaths: ~60 (including 3 infants)
- Victims: Civilians, mostly Germans
- Perpetrators: Imperial Japanese Navy: Crew and officers of the destroyer Akikaze; 2nd Lt. Cmdr. Tsurukichi Sabe; Vice admiral Gunichi Mikawa; Vice admiral Shinzō Ōnishi

The Akikaze massacre, was a war crime committed by the Imperial Japanese Navy on March 18, 1943, during the Pacific War.

The massacre took place on board the Minekaze-class destroyer Akikaze, in the waters of the Bismarck Archipelago, approximately 60 civilians were killed. Most of the victims were Catholic and Protestant clergy and missionaries, mostly of German nationality, who served in northeastern New Guinea and the Admiralty Islands, their servants and dependents were also murdered, including three infants. Bishop Josef Lörks, Apostolic Vicar of Central New Guinea was among the massacred.

== Background ==
Before World War I, the northeastern part of New Guinea was part of the colonial possessions of the German Empire. Under the Treaty of Versailles, Australia assumed sovereignty over these areas; they constituted the mandate territory of Australian New Guinea. Nevertheless, many German missionaries remained on the island, who tried to convert the indigenous population to Christianity and at the same time spread hygiene and provide health care to the native people. Wewak was the seat of the Roman Catholic Apostolic Vicariate of Central New Guinea. During World War II, the German priest, Bishop Josef Lörks, served as the Apostolic Vicar there.

In January 1943, Wewak was occupied by Japanese troops. Shortly thereafter, the occupiers gathered all the Catholic missionaries and moved them to the area of the Saint John mission, which was located on the nearby island of Kairiru. Even though the German missionaries were citizens of allied Nazi Germany, the civil occupational administration established by the Imperial Navy (minsei-bu) considered them neutral citizens. They were allowed to move freely around the island.

Nine months earlier, the Japanese had established a small outpost at Lorengau on Manus Island. A group of Protestant missionaries and their helpers, numbering about 20 people, lived there. Like on Wewak, the Japanese initially considered the missionaries to be neutral and allowed them to move freely around the island. The local Japanese commandant, Petty Officer Harukichi Ichinose was very friendly to the missionaries, often inviting them for dinner and sake at his residence.

The reasons why the Japanese finally decided to murder the missionaries are not entirely clear. In 1943, the Japanese navy was suffering heavy losses in the waters around New Guinea, the Bismarck Archipelago, and the Solomon Islands. Most notably in early March 1943, the Japanese suffered a serious defeat in the Battle of the Bismarck Sea. After the war, Vice Admiral Gunichi Mikawa testified that there was a widespread belief among 8th Fleet officers that white missionaries and natives friendly to them were behind these defeats and were allegedly informing the Allies about the movements of Japanese units using hidden radios. According to historian Mark Felton, this narrative was prepared by Tokkeitai to justify atrocities. Heavy losses for the Japanese Navy were a consequence of the breaking of Japanese codes by American signals intelligence. That these codes had been broken by Allied codebreakers was a fact not known by the Japanese.

Some authors speculate that the massacre was caused by Japanese suspicions that some missionaries and natives they were friendly with were helping Allied pilots hiding in Wewak after being shot down. Bruce Gamble points out that at least two of the Verbites serving in Wewak were US citizens, and the massacre occurred a few days after a Japanese patrol unsuccessfully searched Vokeo Island for hiding pilots. Yuki Tanaka theorized that initially the Japanese intended to use the missionaries' good relations with the local population and their knowledge of the area for their military purposes, but when they were refused, they were perceived as a threat.

== Massacre ==
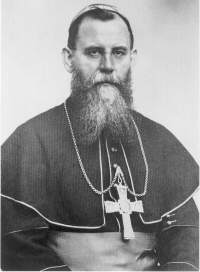
Bishop Josef Lörks, one of the victims of the massacre on board Akikaze

In mid-March 1943, the Minekaze-class destroyer Akikaze arrived at Wewak, bringing supplies of food and medicine for the local garrison. It then departed for Kairiru Island. On March 17, before noon, Akikaze picked up 42 people at Kairiru, including Bishop Lörks. In addition to German clergy and nuns, this group included two monks – US citizens, at least one Papuan girl, several Chinese who worked as the missionaries' servants, and two Chinese infants (orphans or children of Wewak storekeeper Ning Hee), who were cared for by the nuns. These civilians were being evacuated due to the construction of a seaplane base on Kairiru.

Initially, the missionaries, their charges and servants were treated very well. The destroyer's commander, 2nd Lt. Cmdr. Tsurukichi Sabe gave them a separate cabin near the stern. Passengers were provided with sufficient water and food, and the ship's doctor provided assistance to those suffering from seasickness.

The same day, Akikaze went to Lorengau, where in the late afternoon a further 20 people embarked, including 6 missionaries from Liebenzell Evangelical Mission, three other nuns, three other priests, a European infant, a plantation owner named Carl Muster, plantation overseer Peter Mathies, two Chinese, and four Malays. As in the case of the group from Wewak, most of the passengers were of German nationality, although the group from Lorengau also included one Hungarian missionary, Mária Molnár. Commander Sabe initially intended to place them in the same cabin as the Wewak group, but at the request of Petty Officer Ichinose, who personally escorted the missionaries aboard, he agreed to provide them with a separate cabin near the bow.

On March 18, around 11:00, Akikaze anchored in the roadstead of the port of Kavieng in New Ireland. Shortly thereafter, a rowboat arrived with a messenger who brought a sealed order from 8th Fleet headquarters intended exclusively for the destroyer's commander. Having read it, Sabe ordered Akikaze to weigh anchor and set course for Rabaul. He then called all officers to a meeting and reported that the 8th Fleet command had ordered him to "dispose of" all civilians on board. Witnesses recalled that the commander was visibly shocked by the content of the order, describing it as "regrettable", but nevertheless he immediately began to execute it. The order did not explain why these unarmed civilians were to be executed. Passengers from the aft cabin were moved to the bow cabin, justified by the need to carry out alleged cleaning works. At the same time, the ship's carpenters built a makeshift scaffold at the stern, which was to be used as an execution site. To ensure that the victims would not be aware of the purpose of this structure until the very end, a white cloth was spread at the stern, thus creating a kind of curtain. Straw mats were placed around the scaffold to absorb blood and facilitate subsequent cleaning of the deck. These preparations were finished in about an hour.

The execution was meticulously planned. The victims were called one by one to the bridge, where, through an interpreter, they were asked for their name, age and nationality, trying to create the impression that the purpose was merely to verify their identity. Two sailors then escorted the victim to the aft blindfolded. After reaching the scaffold, the victim was tied with ropes to both wrists and then pulled up, making them hang with their arms raised above their head in a pose resembling crucifixion. When the victim reached the appropriate height, a four-person firing squad commanded by Sub-Lieutenant Takeo Terada, opened fire with a light machine gun and rifles. When the execution began, the destroyer accelerated to a high speed of 24 knots (44 km/h; 28 mph), the screams and sounds of gunshots were drowned out by noise of the engine and winds. At the same time, the force of the winds and bullets pushed the hanging bodies over the sea, which made their subsequent removal easier and prevented blood from dripping onto the deck. When the victim was dead, the body was untied and thrown overboard.

The execution of approximately 60 victims took nearly three hours. Men were murdered first, followed by women. Three babies were snatched from the nuns by Japanese sailors and thrown overboard. After the execution, the deck was washed and the wooden structure was dismantled. Then, Japanese officers performed a short Shinto ceremony in honor of the civilians they murdered. During the ceremony, Commander Sabe ordered his subordinates to take an oath to keep the execution absolutely secret.

On the same day, around 10 pm, Akikaze entered the port of Rabaul. Sub-lieutenant Yajirō Kai, who was assigned to the Akikaze crew at Wewak as a translator, testified after the war that he and Commander Sabe went to the 8th Fleet headquarters, where they were received by Lieutenant Shigetoku Kami. The two filed an execution report, Kami then ordered them to keep the events secret. He also ordered Sabe to secretly get rid of all the items that remained after the executions.

== Aftermath ==
The massacre of the missionaries was followed by an attempt to eradicate Christianity from the occupied New Guinea. Shortly after the clergy were deported from Wewak, Japanese soldiers thoroughly destroyed nearly 90% of the plantations they ran, along with the churches and health centers located there. They also murdered many Papuan converts to Christianity, along with non-Christian Papuans.

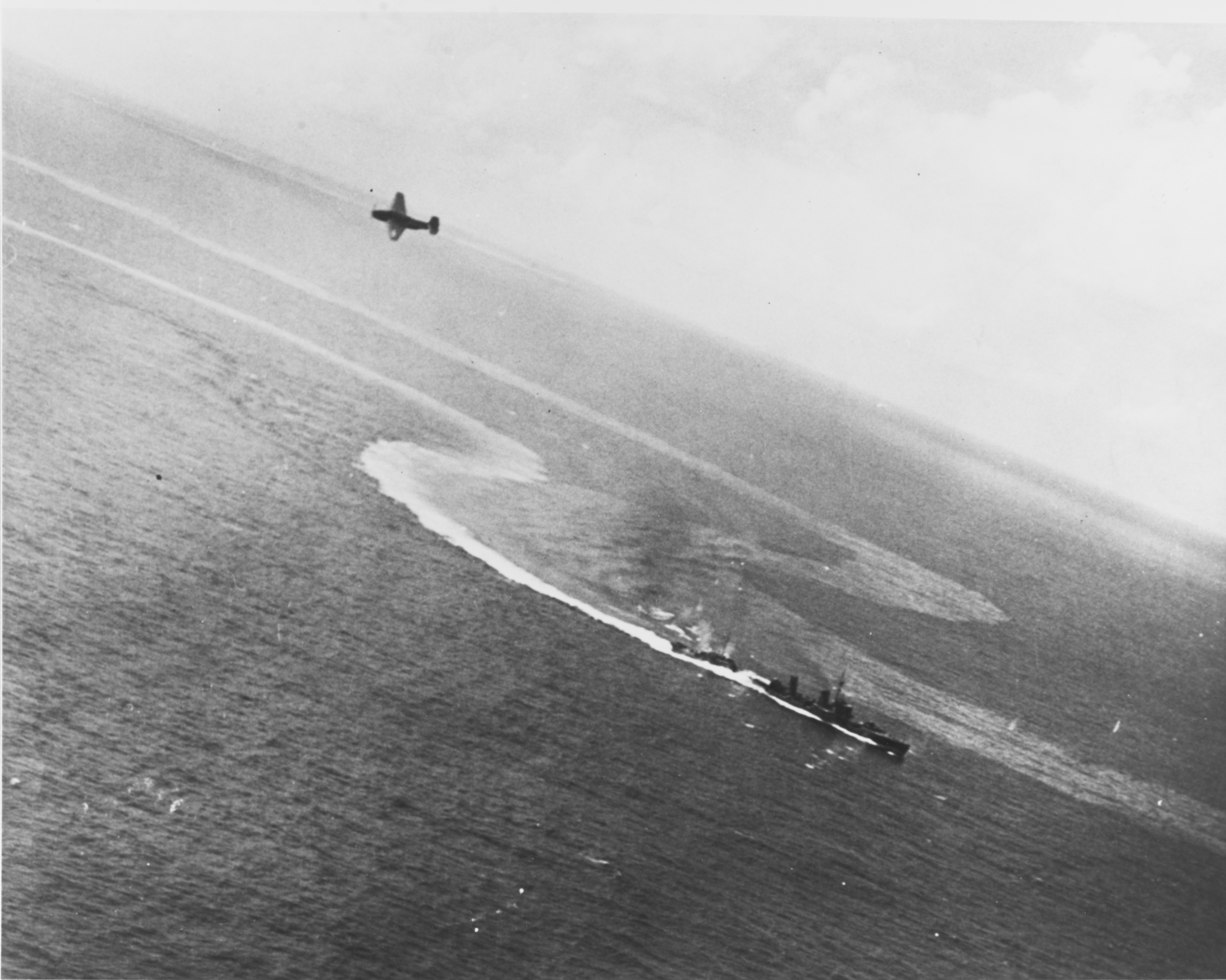
Akikaze maneuvering while under air attack off Truk, 17 February 1944

Sabe died on August 2, 1943, when Akikaze was attacked and damaged by American aircraft; sub-lieutenant Takeo Terada was also killed in the same attack. On 3 November 1944, the submarine USS Pintado fired a spread of torpedoes at the aircraft carrier Jun'yō, but Akikaze intercepted them to save the carrier. Akikaze was sunk, taking her entire crew of 205 men with her.

Akikaze is considered as one of the Japanese "hell ships".

== Post-war investigation ==
After the war, Australian investigators tried to determine the fate of several dozen civilians of European origin who fell into the hands of the Japanese after the fall of New Ireland. Analyzing the movements of Japanese ships and warships that traveled between Kavieng and Rabaul during the war, they interrogated several sailors from the crew of Akikaze. During interrogations in December 1946, they admitted that in March 1943 a group of Europeans had been murdered on board the destroyer. Between January and April 1947, the Australians found and interrogated more sailors from Akikaze. Their testimonies allowed for a relatively accurate reconstruction of the course of the war crime.

Lieutenant Shigetoku Kami of the 8th Fleet was the only staff officer whose name appeared in the testimony of Japanese witnesses. However, Australian investigators suspected that the order to murder over 60 civilians could not have been given by such a low-ranking officer. Therefore, the commander of the 8th Fleet at the time, Vice Admiral Gunichi Mikawa, was interrogated. Mikawa and his chief of staff Vice Admiral Shinzō Ōnishi both vehemently denied any responsibility for the massacre. They initially claimed that Akikaze had never been part of the 8th Fleet, however, that would have made it impossible for Kami to issue the orders even if he did so without permission. They later claimed it was Lieutenant Kami – perhaps in collaboration with another staff officer who was in charge of civilian affairs – Commander Norisaka Andō – who independently ordered the execution of the missionaries and informed about it only after the fact. The motive supposedly because of suspicions that the missionaries were informing the Allies about the movements of Japanese ships. Mikawa claimed that he was shocked when he learned of the massacre from Kami, but was unable to investigate further as he was ordered back to Tokyo for a new assignment.

Due to navy procedures in force during the war, it was unlikely that communication officers of the 8th Fleet would agree to encrypt and deliver Kami's order to the commander of Akikaze, if it did not bear the countersignatures of Mikawa and Ōnishi. Kami, Andō, the head of communications of the 8th Fleet Cmdr. Torao Mori and staff cipher officer Sub-Lieutenant Maeda Minoru could not confirm nor deny the admirals' version of events, because they had all died during the war. In the opinion of Captain Albert Klestadt, an Australian member of the investigation, even if the admirals' claims were true, they had to accept command responsibility for being unable to prevent war crimes committed by subordinates.

Ultimately, the Australians did not bring any charges in the Akikaze massacre. This was probably due to the fact that the main suspects died during the war and there were no Australians among the victims. In addition, most of the civilians killed were German, and since Germany was allied with Japan they were technically not "victims of war crimes" as defined in the Australian War Crimes Act of 1945. Due to the fact that the murdered included US citizens, the Australians handed over the investigation to the American authorities in July 1947. However, the Americans did not take any further action. Neither Admiral Mikawa nor Admiral Ōnishi were prosecuted for the Akikaze massacre, they both lived to be over 90, dying in the 1980s.

== See also ==
- Martyrs of New Guinea
