= David Hand =

David Hand may refer to:

- David Hand (bishop) (1918–2006), first Anglican Archbishop of Papua New Guinea
- David Hand (statistician) (born 1950), British statistician
- David Hand (animator) (1900–1986), animator and animation filmmaker
