= Joe Kopapa =

Papuan New Guinean Anglican bishop

The Most Reverend Joseph Kopapa
- Primate emeritus of Papua New Guinea
- Church: Anglican Church of Papua New Guinea
- See: Port Moresby
- In office: 2010–2012
- Previous post: Bishop of Popondata

Orders
- Ordination: 1990
- Consecration: 2006 by James Ayong

Personal details
- Born: 9 September 1947 (age 78) Sinei, Tufi district, Oro Province

Joseph Kifau Kopapa (born Sinei, Tufi district, Oro Province, 9 September 1947) is a retired Papuan New Guinean Anglican bishop. He was Bishop of the Diocese of Popondota, from 2006 to 2010, and Archbishop and Primate of the Anglican Church of Papua New Guinea, from 2010 to 2012, when he resigned. He is married to Wasita and the couple has five children, three male and two female.

== Early life and professional career ==
He was born in Lefume village, Tufi district, in Oro Province. He did primary school at Sinei, and secondary school at Sogeri (1962–1965). Afterwards, he studied at Vudal Agricultural College in East New Britain Province, where he received a Diploma in Tropical Agriculture, in 1968. He worked for the Department of Agriculture, from 1969 to 1985, where he was Extension Officer, Lecturer, Director of Agricultural Education and Human Resource Development, and also Deputy Secretary. He won a Postgraduate Diploma and a MSc. in Agricultural Extension and Rural Sociology, from the University of Reading, in England, during this time.

== Ecclesiastical career ==
Kopapa did a course of Theological Training at St Stephen's House, in Oxford, England, from 1987 to 1989, when he was awarded a GME. He moved back to Papua New Guinea, where he was ordained an Anglican priest, in 1990. He would serve as an assisting priest at St. John's Cathedral, in Port Moresby, for one year. He moved to Lae afterwards, becoming Rector of Taraka Parish and Chaplain to the University of Technology. He was transferred to the Diocese of Popondota at late 1995, where he served at Holy Family Parish, in Sangara, for one year, and as Rector of Waseta Parish, for two years. He joined Newton Theological College, in 1999, where he was Lecturer, Deputy Principal and Acting Principal, until 2002. He became Chaplain at Martyrs' Memorial School the same year. He was elected Bishop of the Diocese of Popondota in October 2005, and his enthronement took place in January 2006.

He was elected Archbishop and Primate of the Anglican Church of Papua New Guinea at the Provincial Council Meeting, in Port Moresby, on 11 June 2010. Before the primatial election, it was decided that the new primate would have no diocesan responsibility and would solely take on a national role. He resigned in December 2012.

Anglican Communion titles
| Preceded by James Ayong | Primate of the Anglican Church of Papua New Guinea; 2010–2012 | Succeeded by Clyde Igara |
