= George Ambo =

Papua New Guinean Anglican bishop

The Most Reverend Sir George Ambo
- Archbishop of Papua New Guinea
- Church: Anglican Church of Papua New Guinea
- See: Popondetta (1977–1989)
- In office: 1983–1989
- Other post: Assistant Bishop of New Guinea (1960–1977)

Orders
- Ordination: 1958
- Consecration: 1960

Personal details
- Born: 25 November 1922 near Gona
- Died: 6 July 2008 (aged 85) Popondetta

Sir George Ambo KBE (November 25, 1922 – July 6, 2008), originally named Ambo Arukaba after his father and grandfather, was a Papua New Guinean Anglican bishop. He was the first South Pacific native to become a bishop, in 1960. He was also known for his role in a "cargo cult" in the months prior to his death.

== Early life ==
He was born among the Somboba people, one of seven children (with five sisters and a brother), the son of the clan's specially trained and initiated master of traditional dances. He learnt to dance in turn, and "had become a leader of the dance [...] before he started school", which he did in 1934, at an Anglican mission school. He was baptised and given the name "George" the following year.

He subsequently became a teacher at All Souls school in Gona, then, in February 1942, attended St Aidan’s College at Dogura in Milne Bay, to train to become a "teacher-evangelist". In July 1942, the Second World War came to Papua in the form of a Japanese invasion. The college remained open, despite being close to the fighting, and Ambo remained there throughout the war. In 1945, he returned to Gona, his home village, as a parish teacher. In the latter capacity, he taught the people of Gona to maintain most of their customs, including traditional dances and what he called "good traditional stories", but also to embrace Christianity and reject their "belief in witchcraft and sorcery". He taught the stories of the Bible through "traditional dancing, singing, drumming and miming".

== Ministry ==
He married in 1946, and, in 1949, was transferred to Eiwo in the Kokoda hills. In 1952, he began training as a deacon at Newton Theological College at Dogura, and was ordained deacon in 1955, then priest in 1958. In 1959, he was registered by the government as a teacher and was posted to the mission in Boianai. To spread his teachings and reach the people of the area, "scattered through the rugged southern reaches of the Owen Stanley mountain range, Ambo often swam storm-swollen rivers in his shorts".

On October 28, 1960, he was consecrated as the first Papuan bishop and the first native bishop in the South Pacific, at St John’s Cathedral in Brisbane, Australia. He served as an assistant bishop of the (Australian) Diocese of New Guinea until 1977, when that diocese was split in five and the independent Anglican Church of Papua New Guinea erected; Ambo took the new See of Popondetta. Due to his services, he was awarded an OBE in 1978 and a knighthood (KBE) in 1988, becoming Sir George. He became the second archbishop of New Guinea in 1983 (remaining also Bishop of Popondetta throughout), succeeding David Hand, and retired six years later, in 1989, at 65 years old, the age of retirement for Papuan bishops.

== Cargo cult controversy and excommunication ==
In 2007, he was excommunicated after setting a cargo cult with a former Anglican mother superior, Sister Cora (or Kora). They founded a religious movement which they called the Puwo Gawe Ministry, meaning "come and see" in the Ewage language, in reference to the spirits of the dead allegedly bringing "large quantities of goods" to their relatives, and in reference to the Gospel according to St John, chapter 1 verse 39. Sister Cora was reported as the founder of the movement, which Sir George joined at her invitation. The Puwo Gawe Ministry described itself as Christian, and criticised the Anglican clergy for "not doing enough pastoral visits". The movement was a success; it was reported that "[t]he ancestral worship and belief that dead relatives would return with money and cargo is drawing followers right across [the Northern] province and huge guesthouses are built in preparation for the return of dead relatives. [...] [The] Puwo Gawe Ministry has taken Northern Province by storm". It was also described, along with other cult movements in the Northern Province, as being "a major concern both to the Anglican Church and to the provincial and national governments".

Following Ambo's death in 2008. the Anglican Church of Papua New Guinea reported that he had reconciled with the church, asking for forgiveness, confessing and receiving absolution before his death. The church released the following statement:

The late Father had started this ministry 'Puwo Gave Ministry (PGM)' ... to help Anglicans who had drifted away from the Church. This very good intention had been abused by his fellowship, mainly PGM Co-ordinators, who used the good name and reputation of this great man for their own ends to spread false messages and teaching such as 'Cargo Cult', in order to gain for themselves money and popularity. The late Father was not aware that these followers of his were misrepresenting him and using him for their own selfish ends.

It called upon the Puwo Gave Ministry's leaders to "say sorry to God for misrepresenting the late Father through their private confessions and return to work with their parish priests and congregations", so as to enable a reconciliation of the province's Anglicans.

== See also ==
- History of Papua New Guinea
