= Peter Ramsden =

Peter Ramsden may refer to:

- Peter Ramsden (rugby league) (1934–2002)
- Peter Ramsden (bishop)
