= Lucian Tapiedi =

Papua New Guinea martyr

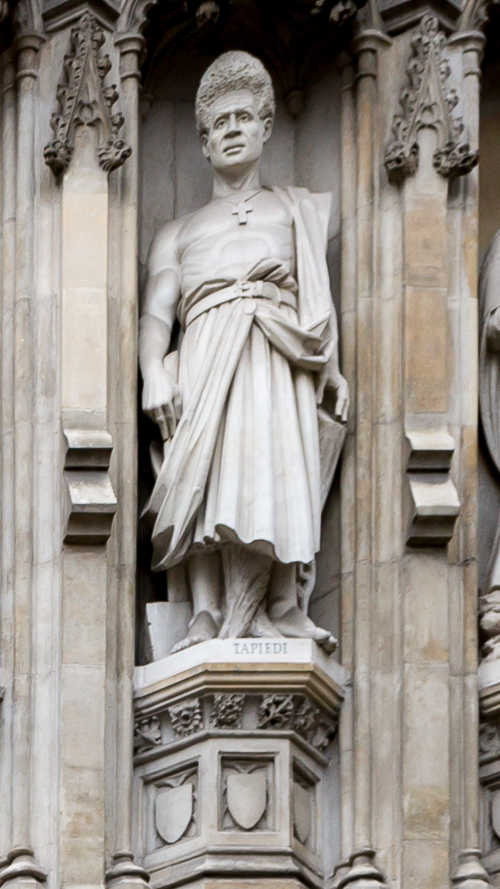
The statue of Lucian Tapiedi, by Tim Crawley, at Westminster Abbey, London

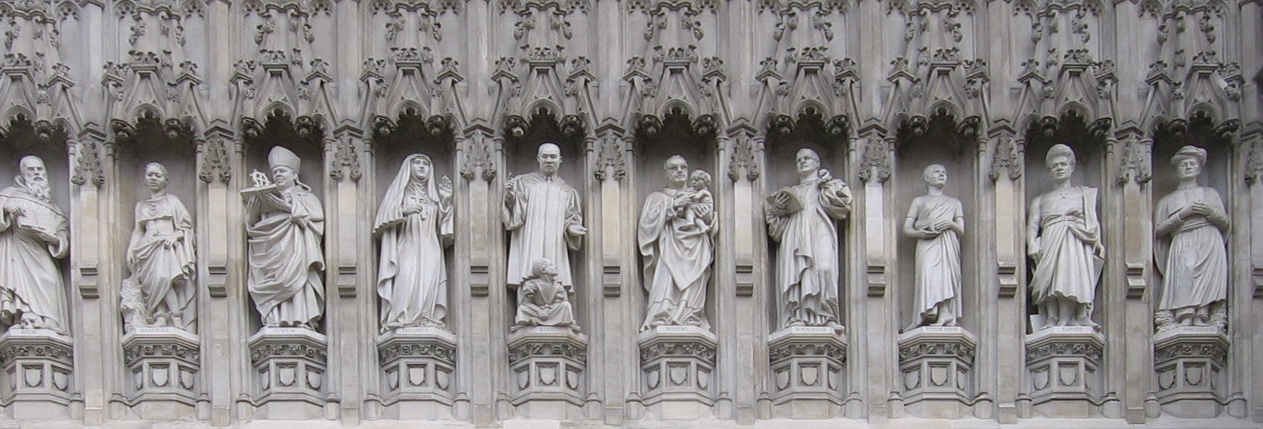
The 20th Century Martyrs above the west entrance of Westminster Abbey. The statue of Tapiedi is second from right.

Lucian Tapiedi (c. 1921 – 1942) was a Papuan Anglican teacher who was one of the Martyrs of New Guinea. The Martyrs were eight Anglican clergy, teachers, and medical missionaries killed by the Japanese in 1942 (a total of 333 church workers of all denominations were killed during the invasion).

== Early life ==
Tapiedi was born around 1921, "the nephew of a suspected sorcerer of Taupota village in Milne Bay district", on the north coast of Papua, and was educated at mission schools, where he was influenced by Nita Inman, the schoolteacher, and the Reverend Edwin Nuagoro, a Papuan priest. In 1939, he entered St Aidan's Teacher Training College at Dogura and in 1941 he became part of the staff at Sangara as a teacher and evangelist.

== Death ==
On 4 January 1942 the Japanese initiated the invasion of Papua New Guinea with the Battle of Rabaul. The Anglican Bishop of New Guinea (then a diocese of the ecclesiastical Province of Queensland), Philip Strong, instructed most Anglican missionaries to remain at their posts despite the likely danger:

If we all left, it would take years for the Church to recover from our betrayal of our trust. If we remain — and even if the worst came to the worst and we were all to perish in remaining — the Church would not perish, for there would have been no breach of trust in its walls, but its foundations and structure would have received added strength for the future building by our faithfulness unto death.

Tapiedi and 10 others, evading the Japanese, came to a village inhabited by the Orokaiva people, and found themselves escorted away by men of that tribe. A man named Hivijapa killed Tapiedi with an axe near a stream by Kurumbo village. The remainder of the group perished soon after; six of them were beheaded by the Japanese on Buna beach. Another source says Tapiedi was "axed to death by the natives after he had returned to retrieve the station records box and some money."

== Legacy ==
His killer, taking the name Hivijapa Lucian, later converted to Christianity. He built a church dedicated to the memory of his victim, which grew to a diocesan center. However, the original building at Higatury was destroyed when Mount Lamington erupted on 21 January 1951 during a diocesan meeting, with considerable loss of life, so the church and center were rebuilt at Popondetta. Another church taking Lucian Tapiedi as its patronal saint is St Lucian's Six Mile in the Six Mile settlement of Port Moresby, north of Jacksons International Airport.

Tapiedi's grave is at Sangara station.

In 1998 a statue of Tapiedi was installed with nine other 20th-century Christian martyrs over the west door of Westminster Abbey in London. In attendance were members of Tapiedi's family, along with the Archbishop of Canterbury and Queen Elizabeth II.

== Veneration ==
The Martyrs of New Guinea are honored with memorial and feast days on the calendars of many churches including the Anglican Communion.
