= St Peter's Church, Eastern Hill =

Church in Melbourne, Australia

Coordinates: 37.8101°S 144.9752°E

St Peter's Church
- St Peter's Eastern Hill
- St Peter's Church tower
- St Peter's Church
- Address: Corner of Albert and Gisborne Streets, East Melbourne, Victoria
- Country: Australia
- Denomination: Anglican
- Churchmanship: Anglo-Catholic
- Website: stpeters.org.au

History
- Status: Church
- Founded: 18 June 1846
- Founder: Charles La Trobe

Architecture
- Functional status: Active
- Architectural type: Church
- Years built: 1846 – 1876

Administration
- Diocese: Melbourne

Clergy
- Vicar: Michael Bowie

St Peter's Church, Eastern Hill, is an Australian Anglican church located on the corner of Albert and Gisborne Streets, East Melbourne, Victoria. Part of the Diocese of Melbourne, the administration of the parish dates from 1847 when letters patent of Queen Victoria declaring the city status of Melbourne were read on the steps of St Peter's in 1848. The church is in the Anglo-Catholic tradition.

St Peter's central position in Melbourne means it is able to extend a number of ministries from the parish. The church is the location of a breakfast program for Melbourne's inner-city homeless, a social enterprise coffee cart and a bookstore supplying local Anglican books, church resources and gifts.

== Location ==
The church is located on the corner of Albert and Gisborne streets on the eastern hill of Melbourne and, on one side, is opposite St Patrick's Cathedral, the Roman Catholic cathedral. On the other side it is opposite the Eastern Hill Fire Station. Although the church is located close to the city centre it draws parishioners and visitors from all over Melbourne and internationally.

== History ==
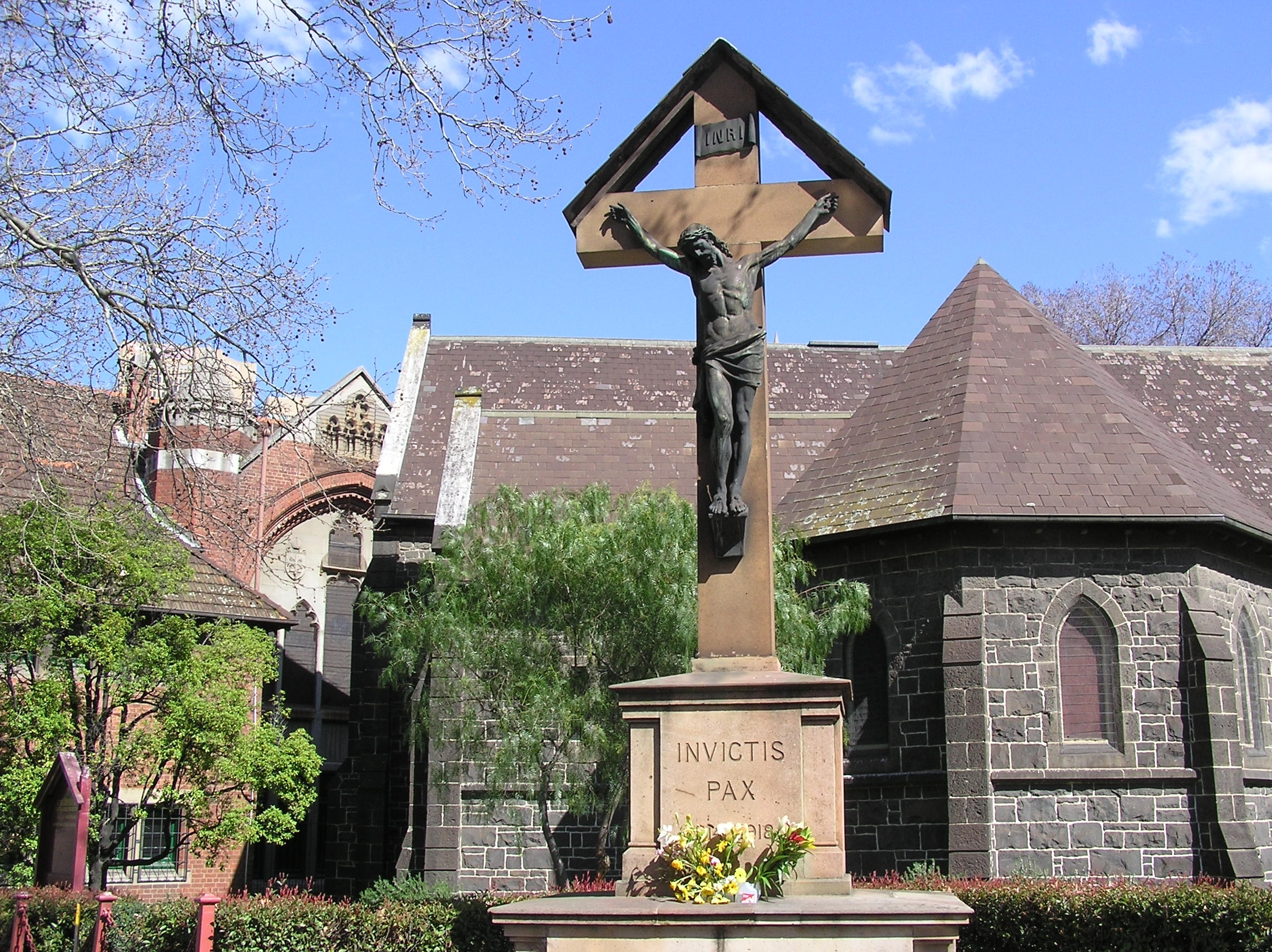
St Peter's Church and cross

St Peter's is the oldest Anglican church standing on its original site in the inner city area. The foundation stone was laid by Charles La Trobe on 18 June 1846. The building was first used for services in 1847 even though the first part was not completed until 1848. During the gold rush years, around 400 baptisms and a similar number of weddings took place each year. The building was extended in 1854 to bring its seating capacity up to 1050, much of this space was in galleries that were removed in 1896. The last extensions to the building took place in 1876. The first vicarage (1849) and school buildings stood on land subsequently purchased by the state parliament in 1884, following which the present vicarage and a new school building (now Keble House) were built.

Under Henry Handfield, the longest-serving of the 19th-century vicars (vicar 1854-1900), St Peter's developed a reputation for good choral music and increasing involvement in social outreach in the inner city, especially when the Sisters of the Holy Name commenced working within the parish boundaries in the 1880s. At this time St Peter's profile was that of a very restrained high church tradition, established mainly through teaching in sermons. The opera singer Nellie Melba had organ lessons at the church as a schoolgirl. The novelist Henry Handel Richardson worshipped at St Peter's and fictionalised this part of her life in an episode in The Getting of Wisdom.

In 1900, Ernest Selwyn Hughes (vicar 1900-26) stamped the parish with an explicit Anglo-Catholic identity, introducing a High Mass as the main Sunday liturgy along with vestments and incense. His mild Christian Socialism was developed by his successor, Farnham Edward Maynard (1926–64), who emphasised a sometimes radical message through publications and radio broadcasts. At his instigation the Brotherhood of St Laurence, then a small religious community, came to work in the Fitzroy part of the parish in 1933 and has developed in different ways to contribute to Melbourne's social conscience. The Catholic and inclusive attitudes of Hughes and Maynard has continued to influence the parish to the present.

The church has a stained-glass window that feature aspects of the Catholic revival up to the early 20th century. One of three panels shows Marian Hughes who was the first woman to take religious vows since the Reformation. She is shown giving her vows to Edward Pusey. Another window, by Napier Waller, commemorates the Martyrs of New Guinea.

== List of vicars ==
A marriage register from St Peter's Eastern Hill, Melbourne, records Henry Hewett Paulet Handfield as the vicar in 1854.

- 1848–1851 Daniel Newman
- 1851–1852 Thomas Hart-Davies
- 1852–1852 David Wood
- 1853–1900 Henry Hewett Paulet Handfield
- 1900–1926 Ernest Selwyn Hughes
- 1926–1964 Farnham Edward Maynard
- 1964–1979 Geoffrey James Taylor
- 1980–1989 John Bayton
- 1990–1998 Ralph David Farrer
- 1998–2010 John Cameron Davis
- 2012–2021 John Hugh Kempster
- 2022–present Michael Nicholas Roderick Bowie

== Music ==
St Peter's is known for the quality of its music. The Choir of St Peter's Eastern Hill, formerly conducted by Andrew Raiskums, is a volunteer mixed choir which leads the church's liturgical music every Sunday as well as for weekday feasts.

The choir's main commitment is at the 11 am High Mass each Sunday. A cantor also sings at the 9.30 am Mass which has a specific family focus. Evensong, at 5.00 pm on Sundays, features a wide variety of musical styles from simple plainsong services to the Evensong repertoire of the English tradition.

There is a certain bias in the choir's repertoire towards music of the Renaissance and Baroque periods such as Dufay, Palestrina, Victoria, Byrd, Monteverdi, Gesualdo, Handel and Bach. The choir also performs many of the Mass settings of Mozart and Haydn, as well as works from the Romantic and modern periods, including those by Schubert, Howells, Fauré, Pärt and Britten. Contemporary works, including house compositions and commissions from Australian composers such as Terpstra, Pearson and Hodgson, are also in the choir's repertoire.

Plainsong forms a major part of the sung Ordinary of the Mass and of the office of Evensong and Benediction; it is an integral part of St Peter's life and liturgical witness.

== See also ==
- List of Anglo-Catholic churches
