= Philip Strong =

Australian Archbishop (1899–1983)

The Most Reverend Sir Philip Warrington Strong KBE CMG CStJ
- Archbishop of Brisbane; Primate of Australia
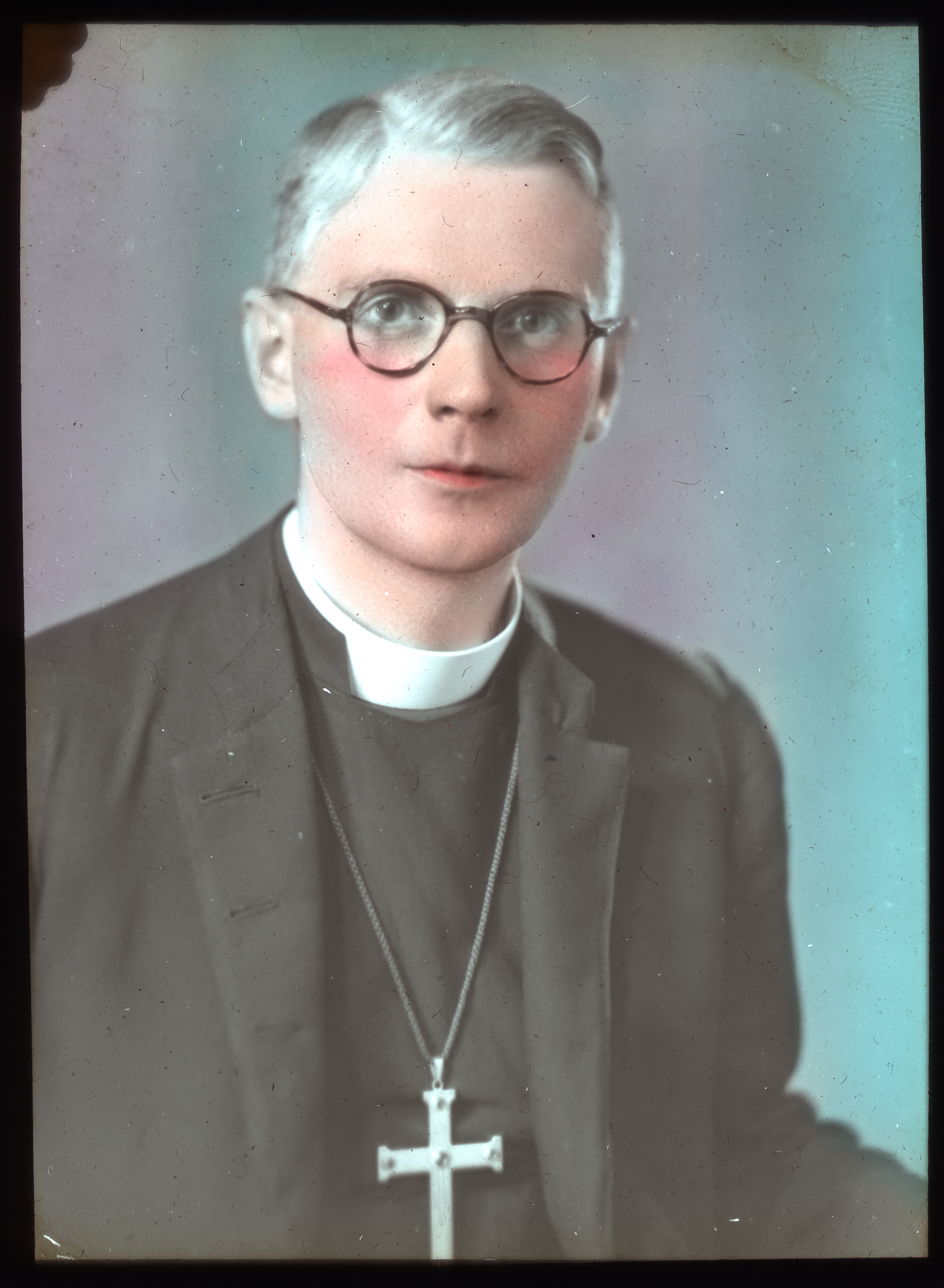
- Strong as bishop of New Guinea
- Church: Anglican Church of Australia
- Province: Queensland
- Diocese: Brisbane
- In office: 1963–1970
- Predecessor: Reginald Halse
- Successor: Felix Arnott
- Other posts: Anglican Primate of Australia (1966–1971); Bishop of New Guinea (1936–1962)

Orders
- Ordination: 1923
- Consecration: 28 October 1936 by Cosmo Gordon Lang

Personal details
- Born: 11 July 1899 Sutton on the Hill, Derbyshire, England
- Died: 6 July 1983 (aged 83) Wangaratta, Victoria
- Education: King's School, Worcester
- Alma mater: Selwyn College, Cambridge

Both the subject and his father sometimes used Warrington Strong as a surname.

Sir Philip Nigel Warrington Strong KBE CMG CStJ (11 July 1899 – 6 July 1983) served as the fourth Bishop of New Guinea from 1936 to 1962 and the fifth Anglican Archbishop of Brisbane from 1962 to 1970, also serving as primate of the Church of England in Australia (now called the Anglican Church of Australia) from 1966.

== Early life ==
Strong was born in Sutton on the Hill in Derbyshire, the son of the Rev Warrington Strong and Rosamond Wingfield Digby (who was the sister of John Wingfield Digby MP). He was educated at the King's School, Worcester (where he was apparently nicknamed "The Bishop") and at Selwyn College, Cambridge. During World War I he served in France with the Royal Engineers and was commissioned as an officer in July 1918. Ordained in 1923, he initially served as a vicar in impoverished industrial parishes in Leeds and at St Ignatius, Hendon, Sunderland.

== Bishop of New Guinea ==
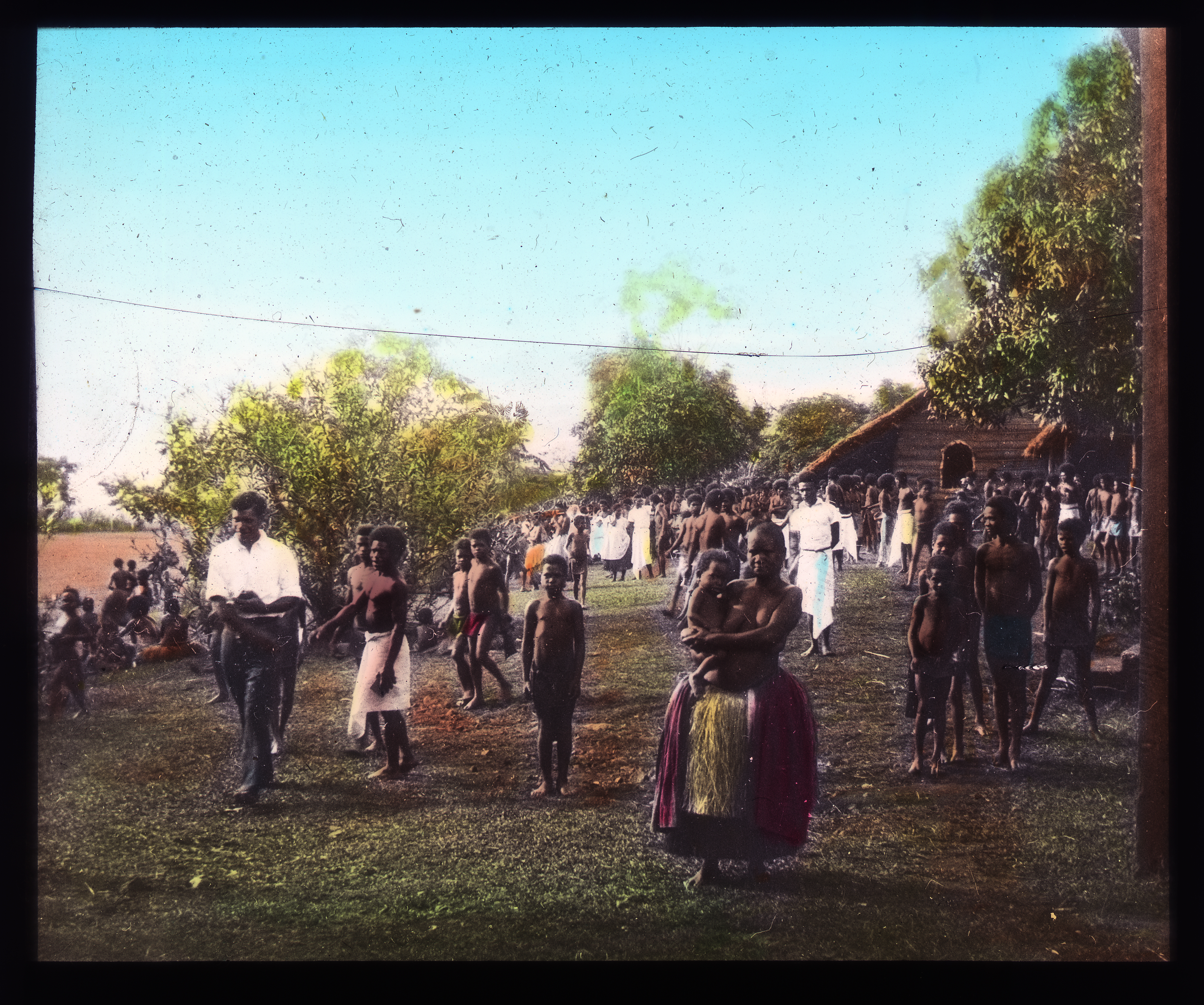
People coming out of church at Bishop Strong’s enthronement, Dogura

He was consecrated a bishop on the Feast of St Simon and St Jude 1936 (28 October), at St Paul's Cathedral (London, UK) by Cosmo Lang, Archbishop of Canterbury.

Following his move to Australasia, Strong served as Bishop of New Guinea between 1936 and 1962, remaining in that post throughout World War II and gaining much respect for his steadfastness during the Japanese invasion of that area. It was Strong who issued the call to Anglican clergy and staff to remain in post during the War. A number of them were killed during the War by the Japanese and, in some cases, Papuans; twelve of them were later honoured as the Martyrs of New Guinea. Strong announced in 1947, following a synod of the New Guinea church, that 2 September would be kept as New Guinea Martyrs' Day each year. A statue of one of the twelve, Lucian Tapiedi, is included in the group of 20th-century martyrs over the west door of Westminster Abbey in London.

In 1948 Strong invited the Rev Alf Clint to come to Gona to become a co-operative adviser. Clint walked from village to village organizing Christian co-operatives.

Strong also served in the Legislative Council of Papua and New Guinea from 1955 after being appointed to replace Frank George Lewis.

== Archbishop ==
During his time as Archbishop of Brisbane, although a religious conservative, Strong was an advocate of co-operation between different Christian denominations. Following the disappearance and presumed death of the Australian prime minister, Harold Holt, in 1967, Strong delivered the eulogy at his memorial service at St Paul's Cathedral, Melbourne.

== Retirement ==
In retirement, Strong lived in the Cathedral Close in Wangaratta.

He returned to Papua New Guinea for the independence celebrations in 1975. He attended an ecumenical service on 14 September, two days before the act of independence, at which the inaugural Prime Minister of PNG, Michael Somare made an Act of Dedication: "We, as your chosen leaders, dedicate ourselves and the people of Papua New Guinea to God in Christian life and service". Strong recorded in his Christmas letter to his friends that year his "hope … that New Guinea may become a truly Christian country, perhaps the first such in the world".

He died in Wangaratta in 1983, aged 83.

Church of England titles
Preceded by Henry Newton	Bishop of New Guinea; 1936–1962	Succeeded by David Hand
Anglican Communion titles
Preceded by Reginald Halse	Archbishop of Brisbane; 1963–1970	Succeeded by Felix Arnott
Preceded by Hugh Gough	Primate of Australia; 1966–1971	Succeeded by Frank Woods
