= Buna Bay =

Bay and port

Buna Bay is a bay and port on the southeast coast of Papua New Guinea. An important shipping port, it was developed for the purpose of transporting agricultural products overseas. The Sangara plantations of coffee, rubber and sugar were traditionally transported cargo to Buna Bay and sent it overseas thence, particularly from the late 1920s.
