= Walter Siba =

Walter Siba, was the third Anglican Bishop of Ysabel, one of the nine dioceses that make up the Anglican Church of Melanesia. He served from 1995 to 1999. he was previously principal of Newton Theological College in Popondetta, Papua New Guinea.
