= Clyde Igara =

Papua New Guinean Anglican archbishop (born 1951)

The Most Reverend Clyde Igara
- Former Primate of Papua New Guinea
- Church: Anglican Church of Papua New Guinea
- In office: 2013-2017
- Previous post: Bishop of Dogura (2010–2013)

Orders
- Ordination: 1997
- Consecration: 28 June 2010 by Joseph Kopapa

Personal details
- Born: 1951 (age 74–75)

Mervin Clyde Igara (born 1951) is a retired Papua New Guinean Anglican archbishop. He was Primate and Archbishop of the Anglican Church of Papua New Guinea from 2013 to 2017. He is married to Miriam and they have five children and five grandchildren.

== Ecclesiastical career ==
Igara attended Martyrs Memorial School. He later achieved a degree in electrical engineering from Unitech, Lae. He worked afterwards as director of engineering and technical services with the National Broadcasting Commission.

He studied for the ministry at Newton Theological College, from 1992 to 1996, graduating with a diploma in theology. He was ordained a deacon in 1996, serving one year at Wamira, near Kaieta, in 1997. Igara was ordained a priest at Ss Peter and Paul Cathedral, Dogura in October 1997. He was a parish priest at Boianai from 1998 to 1999 and at Alotau from 2000 to 2009. In 2000, he was appointed vicar general for the same period.

He became the first native bishop of the Diocese of Dogura, on 28 June 2010, which he was until his appointment to be the primate and archbishop of the Anglican Church of Papua New Guinea at the provincial council held at 14 June 2013. After the retirement of his predecessor, Joseph Kopapa, in December 2012, the positions had been vacant. Igara's installation took place at 20 June 2013.

Anglican Communion titles
Preceded by Joseph Kopapa	Primate of the Anglican Church of Papua New Guinea; 2013–2017	Succeeded by Allan Rirme Migi
