= David Hand (bishop) =

Papua New Guinean clergyman

The Most Reverend Chief David Hand KBE GCL
- Primate of Papua New Guinea, Bishop of Port Moresby
- Church: Anglican Church of Papua New Guinea
- See: Port Moresby
- In office: 1977–1983
- Previous post: Bishop of Papua New Guinea

Orders
- Ordination: 1943
- Consecration: 1950

Personal details
- Born: 11 May 1918 Clermont, Queensland, Australia
- Died: 6 April 2006 (aged 87) Port Moresby, Papua New Guinea

The Most Reverend Geoffrey David Hand KBE GCL (11 May 1918 – 6 April 2006) was an Australian-born Papua New Guinean Anglican bishop. He was the first Archbishop of the Anglican Church of Papua New Guinea.

== Childhood and education ==
Hand was born a British subject in 1918 in Clermont, Queensland, Australia, where his English father, the Reverend William Thomas Hand, was the rector of Clermont. He had two older brothers, Peter and Eustace, both of whom also became priests. When he was four, the family returned to England, with his father taking up a country parish in Tatterford, Norfolk. Hand grew up there and was educated at Gresham's School, Holt, where he was an organ scholar, from 1932 to 1937, and then at Oriel College, Oxford, from 1938 to 1941, where he received a BA degree in history. An Anglo-Catholic, he then trained for ordination into the Church of England at Cuddesdon, from 1941 to 1942.

== Career ==
Ordained a deacon in 1942, Hand became a curate at Heckmondwike in Yorkshire in the north of England and was ordained a priest in 1943. He stayed at Heckmondwike until 1946, when he decided to move to Papua New Guinea, inspired by the life and death of the Reverend Vivian Redlich, a missionary killed there by the Japanese during the Second World War.

Hand arrived in Papua New Guinea in 1946 and spent sixty of his eighty-seven years there. When was consecrated bishop (to serve as coadjutor bishop of New Guinea) on 29 June 1950 at Ss Peter and Paul Cathedral, Dogura, he was the youngest bishop in the Anglican Communion, aged 32.

Known as Percy to friends, Hand never married, remaining a celibate missionary in the tradition of the Oxford Movement, like Trevor Huddleston. He was usually seen as an eccentric, whose usual outfit consisted of a loose shirt, shorts, "sensible shoes" and a wooden cross. He told an Australian journalist in 1972 that "The secret of life in the tropics is Johnson's Baby Powder, lots of it." He could dress more grandly for solemn occasions. During a visit to Papua New Guinea, Prince Philip, Duke of Edinburgh took him for a Roman Catholic bishop. Hand said that he was "Church of England", but Philip asked: "Are you sure?"

Hand was one of the few bishops of the modern world who had walked through equatorial jungle and climbed mountains to find people who had never before had contact with the outside world. In pursuit of publicity to gain support for his diocese, he employed a press officer, Susan Young, who smoked cheroots and flew a plane.

== Independence ==
When Papua New Guinea became independent in September 1975 (British and German New Guinea both having been administered by Australia from 1905 and 1914 respectively), Hand was the first European to apply for citizenship. In 1977 he became the first Archbishop of the Anglican Church of Papua New Guinea. He received several honours, including a knighthood from Queen Elizabeth, the highest rank (Grand Companion) in Papua New Guinea's Order of the Logohu and the title of Chief of the Orokaiva people.

Hand ended his time as archbishop in 1983 at the retirement age of 65 and was succeeded by George Ambo. He then spent two years as the parish priest of his childhood village of Tatterford in Norfolk, where he was still remembered. However, he missed Papua New Guinea and returned, settling in Port Moresby where he wrote his memoirs (and a newspaper column) and headed the local censorship board. When he died in Port Moresby in 2006, he was buried at the Cathedral of the Resurrection, Popondetta. His funeral was delayed, as his coffin was found to be too big for his grave.

== Ministry positions ==
- Ordained deacon 1942
- Curate at Heckmondwike in Yorkshire 1942–1946
- Priest 1943
- Missioner, Diocese of New Guinea 1946–1950
- Priest-in-charge, Sefoa 1947–1948
- Priest-in-charge, Sangara 1948–1950
- Archdeacon of North New Guinea 1950–1965
- Bishop Coadjutor of New Guinea 1950–1963
- Bishop of New Guinea 1963–1975
- Bishop of Papua New Guinea 1975–1977
- Bishop of Port Moresby 1977–1983
- Archbishop of Papua New Guinea 1977–1983
- Priest-in-charge, East with West Rudham, Houghton next Harpley, Syderstone, Tatterford and Tattersett 1983–1985

== Honours ==
- Commander of the Order of the British Empire, 1975
- Knight Commander of the Order of the British Empire, 1984
- Grand Companion of the Order of the Logohu, 2005
- Chief of the Orokaiva people of Oro Province

== Autobiography ==
- Modawa: Papua New Guinea and Me 1946–2002, by Archbishop David Hand (Salpress, Port Moresby, 2002)

== Notes ==
Anglican Communion titles
Preceded by new title	Primate of the Anglican Church of Papua New Guinea; 1977–1983	Succeeded by George Ambo
