= Tatterford =

Village in Norfolk, England

Coordinates: 52.82019°N 0.7687°E

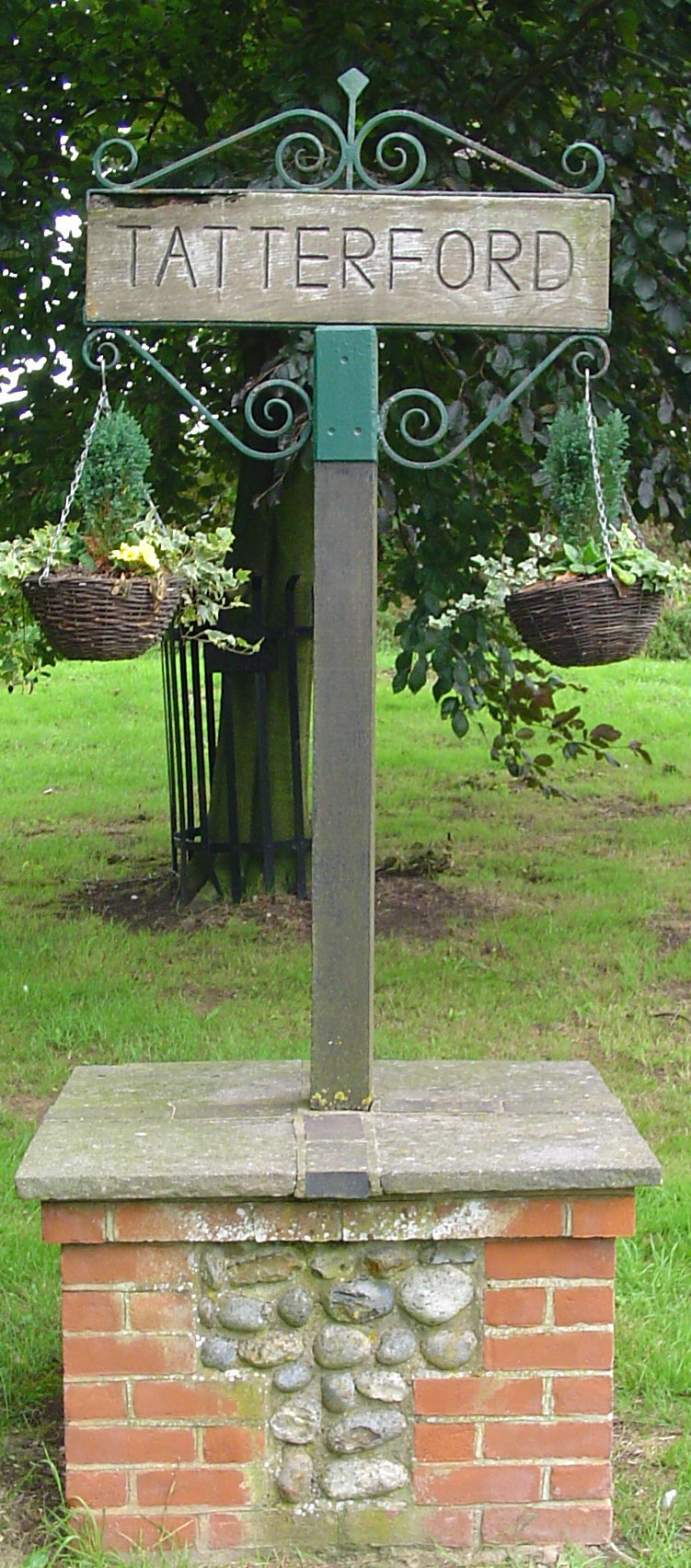
- The Village sign Tatterford, Norfolk

- Location within Norfolk
- OS grid reference: TF890270
  - London: 112 miles (180 km)
- Civil parish: Tattersett
- District: North Norfolk
- Shire county: Norfolk
- Region: East
- Country: England
- Sovereign state: United Kingdom
- Post town: FAKENHAM
- Postcode district: NR21
- Dialling code: 01485
- Police: Norfolk
- Fire: Norfolk
- Ambulance: East of England
- UK Parliament: North Norfolk

Tatterford is a village and former civil parish, now in the parish of Tattersett, in the North Norfolk district, in the county of Norfolk, England. The village is 4.8 miles south west of the town of Fakenham, 30.3 miles north west of Norwich and 112 miles north north east of London. The nearest railway station is at Sheringham for the Bittern Line which runs between Sheringham, Cromer and Norwich. The nearest airport is Norwich International Airport. In 1931 the parish had a population of 66.

== History ==
The villages name means 'Tathere's ford'.

Tatterford has an entry in the Domesday Book of 1086. In the great book Tatterford is recorded by the names Taterforda, the main landholder being Humphrey de Bohun. The survey also mentions that there were two mills. On 1 April 1935 the parish was abolished and merged with Tattersett.

== The parish church of Saint Margaret ==
The parish church of Saint Margaret was built by William Lightly in 1862 as a chapel of ease to the parish church of All Saints at Tattersett. The church was built on the site of an earlier church from the Norman period. The church's east window was designed by Moira Forsyth and was installed in 1951.

== Notable people ==
- David Hand - Archbishop of Papua New Guinea
