= Bruce Gamble (author) =

- Education: Pennsylvania State University
- Occupations: Writer, Historian, and U.S. Military Veteran
- Writing career
- Subjects: World War II, Pacific
- Notable awards: Admiral Arthur W. Radford Award, Gold Medal from the Military Writer's Society of America, Editor's Choice Award from Stone and Stone Second World War Books, and Florida Book Award
- Website: brucegamble.com

Bruce Gamble is an American historian, author, and United States Military veteran. As a historian, Gamble specializes in World War II in the Pacific and has written seven books on this particular topic.

== Early life and education ==
Gamble was born on December 7, the anniversary of the Attack on Pearl Harbor. He grew up in Central Pennsylvania. Gamble comes from a family of military aviators. His father was a B-29 pilot in the Pacific and his uncle was a B-17 navigator in New Guinea.

Gamble graduated from Pennsylvania State University in 1980 with a degree in pre-law. Following his graduation, Gamble attended Aviation Officer Candidate School, and was commissioned at Pensacola, Florida. In 1982, he was "winged" as a Naval Flight Officer specializing in Overwater Jet Navigation.

== Career ==
Gamble spent eight years in naval aviation during the Cold War, where he specialized in electronic warfare. For three years he flew as a navigator on EA-3B Skywarriors, logging nearly 1,000 hours. He was deployed aboard aircraft carriers in the Pacific and Indian Oceans. Following this, Gamble returned to Pensacola, where he instructed student naval flight officers in T-47 Citation II jets for two years. In 1988, he was diagnosed with a malignant spinal cord tumor. After undergoing surgery, he medically retired and began using a wheelchair. Gamble has now been cancer-free for more than 35 years.

Gamble began volunteering at the National Museum of Naval Aviation after his retirement at the age of 30. He also worked part-time for the Naval Aviation Museum Foundation as the staff historian. During his time there, he collected interviews with aviators and wrote numerous articles for their magazine, Foundations.

Gamble embarked on a career as a freelance writer. His first book, The Black Sheep, was published in 1998. His books focus on World War II, specifically in the Pacific region. Three of Gamble's books center on VMA-214, also known as the "Black Sheep" squadron of World War II. Gamble wrote a biography on Pappy Boyington, a United States Marine Corps fighter ace. He is also the author of the popular Rabaul trilogy series. Gamble's books have acquired praise from Publishers Weekly and Booklist.

He has been a featured historian in various documentaries produced by History Channel, Fox News Channel, PBS, and Pritzker Military Museum & Library.

In 2023 Gamble created https://www.youtube.com/channel/UC1uoGKTzzRLx7eIYV9rjRcA, a YouTube channel dedicated to presenting accurate, authentic digital documentaries about a wide variety of military aviation topics. As of 2026, Skywarrior Media videos have amassed more than 1.3 million views collectively.

Gamble is a lifetime member of the Naval Aviation Museum Foundation and Paralyzed Veterans of America.

== Awards ==
Gamble's book, Fortress Rabaul, won the Gold Medal from the Military Writers Society of America and the "Editor's Choice Award" from Stone & Stone Second World War Books.

In 2010, he received the Admiral Arthur W. Radford award for excellence in naval aviation history and literature, presented by the Naval Aviation Museum Foundation.

In 2013, he won a Florida Book Award.

== Published work ==
- Gamble, Bruce (2018). Kangaroo Squadron: American Courage in the Darkest Days of World War II. Da Capo Press. ISBN 978-0306903120.
- Gamble, Bruce (2014). Invasion Rabaul: The Epic Story of Lark Force, the Forgotten Garrison, January-July 1942. Zenith Press. ISBN 978-0760345917.
- Gamble, Bruce (2013). Target: Rabaul: The Allied Siege of Japan's Most Infamous Stronghold, March 1943-August 1945. Zenith Press. ISBN 978-0760344071.
- Gamble, Bruce (2012). Swashbucklers and Black Sheep: A Pictorial History of Marine Fighting Squadron 214 in World War II. Zenith Press. ISBN 978-0760342503.
- Gamble, Bruce (2010). Fortress Rabaul: The Battle for the Southwest Pacific, January 1942-April 1943. Zenith Press. ISBN 978-0760345597.
- Gamble, Bruce (2000). Black Sheep One: The Life of Gregory "Pappy" Boyington. Presidio Press. ISBN 978-0891418016.
- Gamble, Bruce (1998). The Black Sheep: The Definitive Account of Marine Fighting Squadron 214 in World War II. Presidio Press. ISBN 978-0891418252.
