= Peter Ramsden (bishop) =

Former Anglican bishop in Papua New Guinea

The Right Reverend Peter Ramsden
- Honorary Assistant Bishop
- Diocese: Diocese of Carlisle
- Installed: 2015
- Other posts: Bishop of Port Moresby (Papua New Guinea; 2007–2014)

Orders
- Ordination: 1977 (deacon), 1978 (priest)
- Consecration: 2007 by James Aiyong

Personal details
- Born: 1951 (age 74–75)
- Denomination: Anglican
- Spouse: Susan Ramsden
- Children: 2

Peter Stockton Ramsden (born 1951) is a retired British bishop in the Church of England who was the Bishop of Port Moresby in the Anglican Church of Papua New Guinea from 2007 to 2014 and is currently, since 2015, an honorary assistant bishop in the Diocese of Carlisle.

Ramsden attended Birkenhead School and University College London, graduating BSc in 1974. He trained for ordination at the College of the Resurrection, Mirfield, and was ordained deacon in 1977 and priest in 1978.

Ramsden served his title at St Michael and All Angels' Church, Houghton-le-Spring (1977–80) and a second curacy at All Saints and St Mary with St Martin, South Shields, (1980–83). He then served in Papua New Guinea, in the Diocese of Aipo Rongo (1983–90), returning to England to be priest-in-charge of St Mary the Virgin, Micklefield (1990–93), and again in Papua New Guinea (1993–96). He returned to England once more, as Vicar of St Bartholomew's Church, Long Benton, (1996–2007), before being announced in 2006 as the next Bishop of Port Moresby, in succession to Peter Fox.

Ramsden retired in 2014 and the following year was appointed an honorary assistant bishop in the Diocese of Carlisle.

Anglican Communion titles
Preceded by Peter Fox	Bishop of Port Moresby; 2007–2014	Succeeded by Denny Guka
