= Allan Migi =

Papua New Guinean bishop (1960–2020)

The Most Reverend Allan Rirme Migi
- Former Primate of Papua New Guinea
- Church: Anglican Church of Papua New Guinea
- See: Lae
- In office: 3 September 2017–11 May 2020
- Predecessor: Clyde Igara
- Previous post: Bishop of the New Guinea Islands (2000–2017)

Orders
- Ordination: 1990 (as priest)
- Consecration: 2000

Personal details
- Born: 1960 Gasmata
- Died: 22 October 2020 (aged 59–60) Gasmata

Allan Rirme Migi (1960 – 22 October 2020) was a Papua New Guinean bishop who served as archbishop and primate of the Anglican Church of Papua New Guinea from 3 September 2017 to 11 May 2020. He had previously served as Bishop of the New Guinea Islands between 2000 and 2017.

Migi was consecrated Bishop of the Diocese of New Guinea Islands in 2000. The senior bishop of his province, he was elected by the Provincial Council of five members in July 2017, to replace Clyde Igara as the 7th archbishop and primate of the Anglican Church of Papua New Guinea. His enthronement took place at All Souls Church, in Lae, on 3 September 2017. His leadership was based in Lae, in the Morobe Province, since November 2017. He also oversaw the Diocese of Aipo Rongo. Anglican bishops from the Church of England, the Anglican Church of Australia, the Anglican Church of Aotearoa, New Zealand and Polynesia, and the Anglican Church of Melanesia, attended his enthronement.

Migi resigned on 11 May 2020 due to ill health. He died on 22 October 2020 at his home village, Gasmata, in West New Britain Province from COVID-19.

Anglican Communion titles
Preceded by Clyde Igara	Primate of the Anglican Church of Papua New Guinea; 2017–2020	Succeeded by TBC
