= Sangara, Papua New Guinea =

Sangara
- Location within Papua New Guinea
- Coordinates: 8°49′23″S 148°6′7″E
- Country: Papua New Guinea
- Province: Oro (Northern)
- District: Sohe District
- LLG: Higatura Rural LLG
- Time zone: UTC+10 (AEST)
- Climate: Af

Sangara is a settlement in south-eastern Papua New Guinea. It is located to the east of Kokoda.

== History ==
During the Second World War the area saw fighting between the Japanese forces and the allies (primarily Australians). Missionaries were once active in the area and a mission station was established in Sangara. In 1948, Martyrs Memorial School for boys was established in Sangara, named in honour of 11 Anglican missionaries.

== Economy ==
The Sangara also constitute a tribe in the area. They are known for setting up markets along the road to Buna Bay to Yodda Goldfield and trading taro with tobacco and glass bottles.

Sangara is a notable area of coffee production, lying in the foothills. 18 commercial coffee plantations were established in 1926, paving the way for commercial production from 1928. Louis Austen, a retired sea-captain, once managed a government coffee plantation near Sangara. Historically there were also major rubber plantations in the area; the rubber was transported to the port at Buna Bay and then shipped overseas. Sangara was also an important location for the sugar industry in the country. In 1928 a group of Cairns-based investors founded the Sangara Sugar Estates, Ltd., and proposed the payment of capital worth £500,000 to promote sugar production in Papua New Guinea. The company was reported to have applied for some 8100 hectares of land. The sugar industry in Sangara though was reportedly not as successful as the rubber industry and some of the plantations were later converted to produce rubber.

== See also ==
- Kokoda Track campaign
- Lucian Tapiedi
