= James Ayong =

The Right Reverend James Ayong
- Bishop of Aipo-Rongo and Archbishop of Papua New Guinea
- Church: Anglican
- See: Aipo-Rongo
- In office: 1995–2009 (Aipo Rongo); 1996–2009 (archbishop)
- Predecessor: Bevan Meredith (as archbishop)
- Successor: Joe Kopapa (as archbishop)

Orders
- Ordination: 1984
- Consecration: 1995

Personal details
- Born: 1944 Kumbun, West New Britain, Territory of New Guinea
- Died: 5 April 2018 Kimbe, West New Britain, Papua New Guinea

James Simon Ayong (born in a cave in Kumbun, West New Britain in 1944 – 5 April 2018) was the Anglican Archbishop of Papua New Guinea from 19 June 1996 to 2009.

He was the first prelate in the church of Papua New Guinea to come from elsewhere in the country than the eastern Papuan heartland of the country's Anglican Church. Ayong served as a parish priest in rural and metropolitan Papua New Guinea and, unusually among indigenous Papua New Guinean clergy, studied overseas, in England. At the time of his birth Australian New Guinea (the northern half of eastern New Guinea and the New Guinea Islands) was under occupation by the forces of Japan during World War II and Japanese forces and Papuan tribesman sympathetic to the Japanese cause had recently executed the Martyrs of New Guinea.

== Education ==
In 1982, James Ayong earned his diploma in Theology from Newton College, in Papua New Guinea. He would earn a Bachelor of Theology from Martin Luther Seminary, in Lae. Martin Luther Seminary is a joint clergy-training venture of the Evangelical Lutheran Church of Papua New Guinea and the Gutnius Lutheran Church of Papua New Guinea. He earned his Master of Arts degree from Chichester Theological College, in England, in 1994.

== Career ==
- Local Government Officer
- Purchasing Officer and Radio Operator for the Anglican Diocesan Office in Lae, 1976–1980
- Ordination training at Newton College, 1980–1982
- Assistant priest, Lae, 1982–1987
- Lecturer in Old Testament Studies and Theology, Newton College, 1987–1989
- Principal, Newton College, 1989–1993
- Chichester Theological College, England, 1993–1994
- Parish Priest of St. Mary's Parish Gerehu, 1994–1995
- Bishop of Aipo Rongo, 1995-2009
- Archbishop of Papua New Guinea 1996-2009

== Death ==
Ayong died in Kimbe hospital on 5 April 2018.

== See also ==
- Anglican Church of Papua New Guinea

Anglican Communion titles
Preceded by Bevan Meredith	Primate of the Anglican Church of Papua New Guinea; 1996–2009	Succeeded by Joe Kopapa
