= Dogura, Papua New Guinea =

Mission station in Papua New Guinea and seat of the Bishop of Dogura

Dogura
- Location within Papua New Guinea
- Coordinates: 10°6′S 150°5′E
- Country: Papua New Guinea
- Province: Milne Bay Province
- District: Alotau District
- LLG: Alotau Urban LLG
- Time zone: UTC+10 (AEST)
- Climate: Af

Dogura is a mission station in Milne Bay Province, in the south-east of Papua New Guinea. It is located on the northern shore of Milne Bay. The town is located within Alotau Urban LLG.

Its Cathedral of Ss Peter & Paul is the episcopal see of the Diocese of Dogura, in the Anglican Church of Papua New Guinea. The cathedral was consecrated in 1939, and, at the time, was the largest building in the then Territory of Papua and Territory of New Guinea. The mission station complex also includes a hospital (St Barnabas's).

== Climate ==
Dogura has a tropical rainforest climate (Af) with heavy rainfall year-round.
