= Popondetta =

Popondetta Popondota
- Town
- Satellite view

- Location in Papua New Guinea
- Coordinates: 8°45′56″S 148°14′05″E
- Country: Papua New Guinea
- Province: Oro Province
- District: Ijivitari District
- LLG: Popondetta Urban
- Elevation: 279 ft (85 m)

Population (2013)
  - Town: 49,244
  - Urban: 65,000~
- Time zone: UTC+10 (AEST)
- Main languages: Orokaiva, Tok Pisin, English
- Climate: Af

Popondetta (sometimes spelled Popondota) is the capital of Oro (Northern) Province in Papua New Guinea.

In 1951 the city became the focus of relief efforts after nearby Mount Lamington erupted and killed 4,000 people.

Popondetta is near to Buna on the Northern Papua coast and is not far from the beginning of the Kokoda Track, made famous during World War II.

This area of New Guinea is home to the endangered Queen Alexandra's birdwing, the world's largest butterfly.

== Climate ==
Popondetta has a tropical rainforest climate (Köppen Af) with heavy rainfall year-round.

Climate data for Popondetta
Month	Jan	Feb	Mar	Apr	May	Jun	Jul	Aug	Sep	Oct	Nov	Dec	Year
Mean daily maximum °C (°F)	31.8 (89.2)	31.7 (89.1)	31.2 (88.2)	31.0 (87.8)	30.4 (86.7)	29.9 (85.8)	29.6 (85.3)	30.0 (86.0)	30.4 (86.7)	30.8 (87.4)	31.3 (88.3)	31.5 (88.7)	30.8 (87.4)
Daily mean °C (°F)	27.0 (80.6)	26.8 (80.2)	26.6 (79.9)	26.4 (79.5)	26.0 (78.8)	25.5 (77.9)	25.0 (77.0)	25.3 (77.5)	25.7 (78.3)	26.0 (78.8)	26.4 (79.5)	26.7 (80.1)	26.1 (79.0)
Mean daily minimum °C (°F)	22.2 (72.0)	22.0 (71.6)	22.1 (71.8)	21.8 (71.2)	21.7 (71.1)	21.1 (70.0)	20.5 (68.9)	20.7 (69.3)	21.1 (70.0)	21.3 (70.3)	21.6 (70.9)	21.9 (71.4)	21.5 (70.7)
Average rainfall mm (inches)	313 (12.3)	285 (11.2)	285 (11.2)	248 (9.8)	201 (7.9)	120 (4.7)	100 (3.9)	110 (4.3)	165 (6.5)	203 (8.0)	305 (12.0)	365 (14.4)	2,700 (106.2)

== Education ==
Newton Theological College is located in Popondetta. Papua New Guinea University of Natural Resources and Environment is located in the Sohe District.
