= John Matthews =

John Matthews may refer to:

== Politics ==
- John Matthews (Australian politician) (1928–2019), New South Wales politician
- John Matthews (physician) (1755–1826), physician and poet, MP for Herefordshire, 1803–1806
- John Ernest Matthews (1840s–1930), British politician
- John H. Matthews (known as Jack, 1888–1956), Canadian politician
- John Matthews (South African politician), South African politician and Little Rivonia Trialist
- John Matthews (Upper Canada politician) (c. 1763–1832), English-born politician in Upper Canada
- John W. Matthews Jr. (born 1940), member of the South Carolina Senate

== Sports ==
- John Matthews (American football) (born 1986), American NFL wide-receiver
- John Matthews (footballer) (born 1955), English Association footballer
- John Matthews (English cricketer) (1847–1912), English cricketer
- John Matthews (Scottish cricketer) (1921–2009), Scottish cricketer and physician
- John Albert Mathews (born 1951), American Olympic rower
- John Matthews (wrestler) (born 1951), American Olympic wrestler
- John Matthews (rugby union) (1920–2004), English rugby union player

== Others ==
- John Matthews (bishop) (1900–1978), Australian Anglican bishop
- John Matthews (soda water manufacturer) (1808–1870), English American inventor
- John A. Matthews (1876–1966), Montana Supreme Court judge
- John C. Matthews (1841–1927), Union Army soldier and Medal of Honor recipient
- John Hobson Matthews (1858–1914), Roman Catholic historian, archivist and solicitor
- John Matthews (engineer) (1930–2025), British agricultural engineer
- John Matthews (historian) (born 1940), British historian
- John and Caitlin Matthews (born 1948), British writer and mythologist with his wife Caitlin
- John Matthews, artistically also known as Ricardo Autobahn (born 1978), British DJ, songwriter and musician
- John Matthews (died 1798), British sailor

== See also ==
- John Mathews (disambiguation)
- Jack Matthews (disambiguation)
- John Mathew (disambiguation)
