= Poey Passi =

One of the first two Torres Strait Islanders to become an Anglican priest

Poey Passi (1888 – 2 April 1958) was one of the first two Torres Strait Islanders to be ordained a priest in the Anglican Church of Australia (then called the Church of England in Queensland, Australia) in 1925.

== Early life ==
Passi was the son of the last of the Zogire, a priestly caste which combined pagan priestly powers with a chieftain's authority, also known as the Mamoose.

== Clerical career ==
In the days of the London Missionary Society's management of the missions in the Torres Strait, Passi was a lay teacher.

He trained for ordination at St Paul's Theological College, Moa. He was ordained deacon in 1919 by the Bishop of Carpentaria, the Rt Rev Henry Newton, and priest in 1925, by his successor the Rt Rev Stephen Davies. He was ordained along with Joseph Lui, and the two were the first two Torres Strait Islanders to be ordained priest in what is now known as the Anglican Church of Australia. The first Aborigine to be ordained a deacon was James Noble in 1925; it was not until 1970 that an Aborigine, Patrick Brisbane, was ordained priest.

Passi was a missionary in the Torres Strait 1919–1925 (initially as a curate to the Rev John Done at Boigu), Chaplain at the Lockhart River Mission 1925–1927, and Missionary on Murray Island 1927–1931. Subsequent appointments were as Assistant Priest to the Torres Strait Mission on Saibai Island 1931–1933, Missionary Yam Island 1933–1939, Missionary Badu Island 1939–1941, Missionary in the Torres Strait 1941–1952, Priest in Charge Murray Island 1942–1952 and Priest in Charge Torres Strait 1952–1954. In 1926 it was reported that Passi and Lui did not wear the western clerical collar, but instead wore a native costume of calico and singlet.

Passi was credited by his congregations as having the power of healing and clairvoyance. During the Torres Strait Island company boat strike of 1936, Passi put a curse on Eseli Peter for strike-breaking activity.

== Personal life ==
A nephew, the Rev Dave Passi, was one of the plaintiffs in the landmark native title case Mabo v Queensland (No 2).

Passi married Alice Namok; they had five daughters. In retirement, Passi lived with a daughter on Murray Island. He died in 1958, aged 70. His funeral service was held at Quetta Cathedral, and he was interred in the Thursday Island Cemetery, his biretta and stole being placed on the coffin. In 1966 his mortal remains were reinterred in the sanctuary of the newly built church on Murray Island. In 1979 a stained glass window depicting St Bartholomew was installed in Quetta Cathedral as a memorial to Passi.
