= Patrick Brisbane =

First Aboriginal Australian to become an Anglican priest

Patrick Brisbane (1926 – 8 November 1974) was the first Aboriginal Australian to be ordained a priest in the Anglican Church of Australia (then called the Church of England in Australia) in 1970.

== Early life ==
Brisbane was born in 1926 in the tribal bushland of the Atampaya people, but brought up at Injinoo (then called Cowal Creek) when members of his tribe settled there. Brisbane was educated at Cowal Creek to Year 5 Standard. For 15 years he was a pearl diver.

== Clerical career ==
Brisbane had felt a calling to ordination since his schooldays. He trained for ordination at St Paul's Theological College, Moa. He was ordained deacon in 1969 and priest in 1970, by the Bishop of Carpentaria, the Rt Rev Eric Hawkey. Alan Gill, the religious affairs correspondent of The Sydney Morning Herald, described Brisbane's ordination as a priest as "perhaps the most momentous - if least reported - event in Australian Anglican history". Brisbane's importance to Australian Anglican history has been little recognised, but it was sufficiently significant that the Queensland Minister for Aboriginal and Island Affairs, Nev Hewitt, attended the ordination. The first Aboriginal Australian to be ordained a deacon in the Anglican Church had been the Rev James Noble in 1925, but Noble never proceeded on to ordination as a priest. The first Torres Strait Islanders to be ordained priests in the Anglican Church were the Rev Joseph Lui and the Rev Poey Passi in 1925.

Brisbane was a curate at St Michael's Church at Agenehambo, near Popondetta, in Papua New Guinea, 1969–70, and then Curate at Lockhart River from 1971. The former Bishop of Carpentaria, the Rt Rev Tony Hall-Matthews, credits Brisbane with having taught him much about Aboriginal culture at Normanton. Brisbane then returned to his community at Injinoo, where he was Priest in Charge.

== Personal life ==
Brisbane was married to Tuam, and had two children. He died in 1974, and was buried in the church at Injinoo. When that building was replaced by a new church in 1977, his remains were translated to it. A new tombstone was installed in 1992.
