= John Mathews =

John Mathews may refer to:

- John Mathews (American pioneer) (died 1757), settler of the Shenandoah Valley, Virginia
- John Mathews (clerk) (1768–1849), American surveyor, politician and lawyer
- John Mathews (lawyer) (1744–1802), Governor of South Carolina in 1782 and 1783
- John Mathews (cricketer) (1884–1962), English cricketer active from 1903 to 1930 who played for Sussex
- John Mathews (theologian) (born 1952), New Testament scholar
- John Mathews (professor) (born 1946), Australian professor of competitive dynamics and global strategy
- John Albert Mathews (born 1951), American competitive rower
- J. E. Mathews, American silent film director working in Australia
- John Mathews (judge) (1892–1955), American lawyer, legislator, and judge
- John Mathews Jr. (died 1988), American legislator
- John Allen Mathews (?–1861), American frontiersman and Confederate officer
- John Joseph Mathews (1894–1979), Osage Nation leader
- John Hopper Mathews (1926–2015), Osage Nation academic and child actor
- John Hobson Mathews (1858–1914), Roman Catholic historian, archivist and solicitor
- John David Mathews, Pennsylvania State University professor

== See also ==
- John Matthews (disambiguation)
- John Mathew (disambiguation)
