= Bishop's College =

Bishops College or Bishop's College may refer to:

- Bishop's College, Calcutta, est. 1820
- Bishops College (Newfoundland) in St. John's, Newfoundland, Canada
- Bishop's College (Sri Lanka) in Colombo, Sri Lanka
- Bishop's University in Quebec, Canada est. 1843, formerly known as the University of Bishop's College
- Bishop's College School in Lennoxville, Quebec, Canada est. 1836
- Diocesan College (more commonly known as Bishops College) in Cape Town, South Africa
- Bishops' College, Cheshunt, a former Anglican theological college
- Bishop's College, Thursday Island, a former Anglican theological college in Queensland, Australia
