= Viajes Clásicos =

Spanish-language book series

Viajes Clásicos (“Classic Travels”) is a Spanish-language book series with Spanish original texts and translations of famous travel accounts that was published by the Calpe publishing house from 1921 into the 1940s. The volumes were edited and annotated under the direction of J. Dantín Cereceda.

Juan Dantín Cereceda (es) (1881–1943) was a Spanish geographer. He is considered the person who introduced the school of regional geography in Spain and one of the renewers of Spanish geography through his studies on the Iberian Peninsula and of the Spanish world.

Volume 23 for example is the report about the first voyage around the globe of Pigafetta.

== Volumes ==
- 1/2. Speke (J. H.): Diario del descubrimiento de las fuentes del Nilo.
- 3/4. Bougainville (L. A. de): Viaje alrededor del mundo.
- 5/6. Bernier (F.): Viaje al Gran Mogol, Indostán y Cachemira. (archive.org)
- 7. La Condamine (C. de): Viaje a la América meridional.
- 8. Matthews (J.): Viaje a Sierra Leona, en la costa de África.
- 9/10. Darwin (C): Diario del viaje de un naturalista alrededor del mundo.
- 11/12/13. Cook (J.): Relación de su primer viaje alrededor del mundo.
- 14/15/16. Cook (J.): Viaje hacia el Polo Sur y alrededor del mundo.
- 17. Núñez Cabeza de Vaca (Álvar): Naufragios y Comentarios de...
- 18. Fernández de Navarrete (M.): Viajes de Cristóbal Colón. Un volumen, con un mapa del derrotero de los cuatro viajes del inmortal navegante.
- 19/20. Hernán Cortés: Cartas de relación de la conquista de Méjico. (archive.org: I, II)
- 21/22. López de Gomara: Historia general de las Indias.
- 23. Pigafetta: Primer viaje en torno del Globo. (archive.org)
- 24. Cieza de León (Pedro), La crónica del Perú.
- 25. Fernández de Navarrete (M.), Viajes de los españoles por la costa de Paria. (archive.org)
- 26. Fernández de Navarrete (M.), Viajes de Américo Vespucio.
- 27/28. Azara (Félix de), Viajes por la América Meridional.
- 29/30. Bernal Díaz del Castillo, Historia verdadera de la conquista de la Nueva España.
- 31/32/33. Fray Pedro de Aguado, Primera parte de la recopilación historial resolutoria de Santa Marta y Nuevo Reino de Granada de las Indias del Mar Océano.
- 34. Marco Polo, El Millón.

Further planned volumes (“en prensa”, i.e. “in press”) were, according to the publisher:

Ross (John), Narración de un segundo viaje en basca del paso del Noroeste; Mungo Park, Viajes por las regiones interiores de África; Dumont D'Urville, Viaje alrededor del mundo; Camerón, A través del África. Schweinfurth, En el corazón de África; Burton (R.), Aventuras en el Dahomey; Clavijo (Rui González de), Vida y hazañas del Gran Tamorián; Bonneville (B. L. E.), Las Montañas Rocosas; Hernández (Luis), Relación de Omagua y El Dorado; Clapperton, Viaje al África central; Wood Rogers, Viaje alrededor del mundo; La Perouse, Viaje alrededor del mundo; Carver (Jonathan), Viajes por el interior de América septentrional (1766-1768); Caillié (Renato), Diario de un viaje a Tnmbuctu y a Yenne, en el África central; Dampier (Guillermo), Nuevo viaje alrededor del mundo (1697).

== See also ==
- Categoría:Colecciones literarias de España – in Spanish
