= St Paul's Theological College, Moa =

Former Anglican theological college in Australia

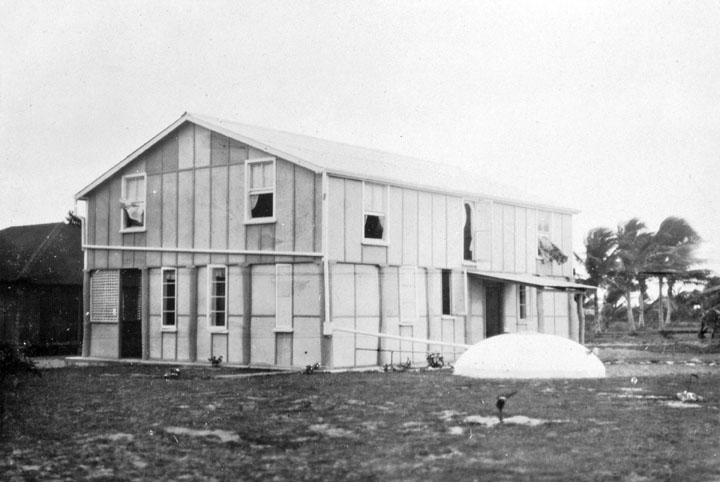
The 1933 rebuilt college, under construction in 1931

St Paul's Theological College was an Australian educational institution on Moa Island, Queensland, established in 1917, alternating between Moa Island and Thursday Island. It trained Indigenous candidates for ordination in the Anglican Church of Australia (called the Church of England in Australia until 1981).

== Origins ==
Christian missions to the Torres Strait Islands were begun by the London Missionary Society in 1872. The LMS handed over responsibility for the missions to the Church of England in Australia in 1915. One of the consequences of that transfer was a decision to establish a theological college for the training of native clergy. This took effect by the expansion of the school established by the Anglican Deaconess Florence Buchanan who served on Moa Island from 1908 to 1911. The establishment of the theological college was driven by its first principal, Fr Geoffrey Luscombe.

== History ==
The theological college opened in 1917, named St Paul's, on Moa Island. The original college building was a simple structure, constructed of coconut leaf and grass, with its floor raised above the ground. A larger version was built by the students in 1920, which was dedicated by the Bishop, Henry Newton, that year. The first students to be ordained deacon were Joseph Lui and Poey Passi in 1919. They were also the first Torres Strait Islanders to be ordained priest, in 1925. The college was rebuilt again in 1933.

The college closed during WWII; after the War it reopened in 1948 on Thursday Island. A new college building was erected on Moa Island and dedicated in 1959. The college closed in 1969, and local candidates were sent to mainland Australia or to Newton Theological College in Papua New Guinea for training instead. The college reopened on Thursday Island in 1989 with the Very Rev Gayai Hankin resigning as Dean of Quetta Cathedral to become the first principal. (Hankin later became a Bishop of the Church of the Torres Strait, a member of the continuing Anglican Traditional Anglican Communion.) It was still in existence in 2009.

== Principals ==
- The Rev Geoffrey Archibald Luscombe, 1917–1921.
- The Rev Junius Wilfred Schomberg, 1921–1936.
- The Rev Guy Henry Darke, 1936–1938.
- The Rev Godfrey Gilbert, 1938–1942.
- The Rev Alexander Peter Bruce Bennie, 1946-1952 (concurrent with being Sub-Dean of Quetta Cathedral).
- The Ven Cyril Graham Brown, 1953–1959.
- The Rev Peter Jowett Hand (later Br Peter SSF) (brother of the Most Rev David Hand), 1959–1969.

== Notable alumni ==
- The Rev Patrick Brisbane, the first Australian Aborigine to be ordained priest in 1970.
- The Rt Rev Kiwami Dai, the first Torres Strait Islander to be consecrated a bishop, in 1986, as assistant bishop in the Diocese of Carpentaria.
- The Rev Joseph Lui, one of the first two Torres Strait Islanders to be ordained deacon in 1919 and priest in 1925.
- The Rev Poey Passi, one of the first two Torres Strait Islanders to be ordained deacon in 1919 and priest in 1925.
