= Bishop's College, Thursday Island =

Former Anglican theological college in Australia

The Bishop's College was a short-lived Australian educational institution on Thursday Island, Queensland, established in 1900. It trained candidates for ordination in the Anglican Church of Australia (which, at the time, was called the Church of England in Australia), specifically for the Diocese of Carpentaria. It should not be confused with St Paul's Theological College, Moa, established in 1917 on nearby Moa Island but which for some of its history was located on Thursday Island: St Paul's was established for native students, while Bishop's College was established for white students.

== History ==
The Diocese of Carpentaria was established in 1900, and Gilbert White was installed as its first bishop. White immediately set about establishing a theological college; Earl Beauchamp, the then Governor of New South Wales, provided an initial endowment for three students for three years. In 1903 he extended the endowment for a further three years.

The Primate, Dr Saumarez Smith, visited the college in 1904, at which point there were "a number" of students. The college closed in 1907, although the Cable Clerical Index describes the Rev John Jones (who was the Sub-Dean at Quetta Cathedral until 1910) as being Tutor at the college from 1905 to 1910.
