= Yuhanon =

Yuhanon is a surname and a given name. Notable people with the name include:

- Yuhanon Chrysostamos, Metropolitan of Niranam Diocese of Malankara Orthodox Syrian Church in India
- Yuhanon Mar Dimithrios (born 1952), New Testament scholar, Metropolitan of the Indian, Orthodox Church
- Philoxenos Yuhanon Dolabani (1885–1969), the Syriac Orthodox Metropolitan of Mardin, Turkey and its environs
- Yuhanon Meletius, the metropolitan bishop of the Malankara Orthodox Syrian Church's Thrissur Diocese in India
- Yuhanon Policarpos, Metropolitan of Angamaly Diocese of Malankara Orthodox Syrian Church
- Yuhanon Qashisho (1918–2001), Assyrian author and poet
- Yuhanon Thevodoros, the metropolitan of Kottarakkara Punalur Diocese of the Malankara Orthodox Syrian Church
- Militos Yuhanon, Syriac Orthodox bishop in Malankara
- Philoxenos Yuhanon (1941–2015), Syriac Orthodox bishop
