= Joseph Lui =

One of the first two Torres Strait Islanders to become an Anglican priest

Joseph Lui (died 17 May 1941) was one of the first two Torres Strait Islanders to be ordained a priest in the Anglican Church of Australia (then called the Church of England in Australia) in 1925.

== Early life ==
Lui was the son of Lui Lifu (also known as Getano Lui of Lifu), a Pacific Islander from Lifou Island in the Loyalty Islands who moved to the Torres Strait and married a Murray Island woman. His father was a teacher with the London Missionary Society, sometimes described as a pastor. Prior to ordination, Lui was the helmsman on the mission lugger the Torres Herald I. He was also an interpreter for the mission, as he understood all the dialects of the Torres Strait Islands.

== Clerical career ==
He trained for ordination at St Paul's Theological College, Moa. He was ordained deacon in 1919 by the Bishop of Carpentaria, the Rt Rev Henry Newton, and priest in 1925, by his successor Rt Rev Stephen Davies. He was ordained along with Poey Passi, and the two were the first two Torres Strait Islanders to be ordained priest in the Anglican Church of Australia. In 1926 it was reported that Passi and Lui did not wear the western clerical collar, but instead wore a native costume of calico and singlet. The first Aborigine to be ordained a deacon was James Noble in 1925; it was not until 1970 that an Aborigine, Patrick Brisbane, was ordained priest.

From 1919 to 1931 Lui was Curate at Dauan and Saibai, including periods as Temporary Chaplain at the Mitchell River Mission (1925–1926) and Curate in Charge at Darnley and Stephens Island (1926). From 1931 he was Priest in Charge of Murray Island.

== Personal life ==
Lui died in 1941 on Thursday Island. He was buried in the Lady Chapel of St Paul's Church, Moa Island.
