= St Paul's Theological College =

Several institutions are known as St Paul's Theological College:

- College of the Transfiguration, an Anglican theological college in Grahamstown, Eastern Cape, which incorporated the former St Paul's Theological College, Grahamstown
- St Paul's Theological College, Mauritius, a former Anglican theological college in Mauritius
- St Paul's Theological College, Moa, a former Anglican theological college in the Torres Strait Islands, Australia

See also:

- St Paul's Theological Centre, an Anglican theological centre in London
