= Hawkey =

Hawkey is a surname. Notable people with the surname include:

- Raymond Hawkey
- Renn Hawkey
- Christian Hawkey
- Eric Hawkey

== See also ==
- hawkey, a high-level API for the libsolv library
