= Jack Matthews =

Jack Matthews or Mathews may refer to:

- Jack Matthews (rugby union) (1920–2012), Welsh rugby player
- Jack Matthews (author) (1925–2013), American author
- Jack Mathews (actor), alternative name of Canadian guitarist and actor Jack (J.D.) Nicholsen from the Leslie Spit Treeo
- Jack Mathews (footballer) (1914–1994), Australian rules footballer
- Jack Matthews, character in Our American Cousin
- John H. Matthews (1888–1956), known as Jack, politician
- Jack Matthews (Big Brother contestant), contestant of Big Brother 21 (US)
- Jack Mathews (hurdler) (born c. 1936s), 1955 NCAA 220 yards hurdles runner-up for the Iowa Hawkeyes track and field team. Iowa Hawkeye Hall of Fame

== See also ==
- John Matthews (disambiguation)
