= John Hudson (bishop) =

Australian bishop (1904–1981)

Wilfrid John Hudson CBE, AKC, (12 June 1904 – 16 February 1981) was the fourth Bishop of Carpentaria.

He was born on 12 June 1904, educated at Brighton College and trained for the priesthood at King's College London and ordained in 1932 After a curacy at St Barnabas, Pimlico he went to Australia where he was Principal of the Brotherhood of the Good Shepherd in Dubbo and Examining Chaplain to the Bishop of Bathurst. Returning to England he was Curate of All Saints, Woodham then Rector of Letchworth until his appointment to the episcopate. He was consecrated a bishop on 21 September 1950 by Reginald Halse, Archbishop of Brisbane, to serve as diocesan Bishop of Carpentaria. After ten years in northern Australia he became bishop coadjutor of Brisbane, until his retirement in 1973. He died on 16 February 1981.

Religious titles
Preceded by Stephen Harris Davies	Bishop of Carpentaria; 1950–1960	Succeeded by Seering John Matthews
