= Henry Newton (bishop) =

English Anglican colonial bishop

The Right Reverend Henry Newton
- Bishop of New Guinea
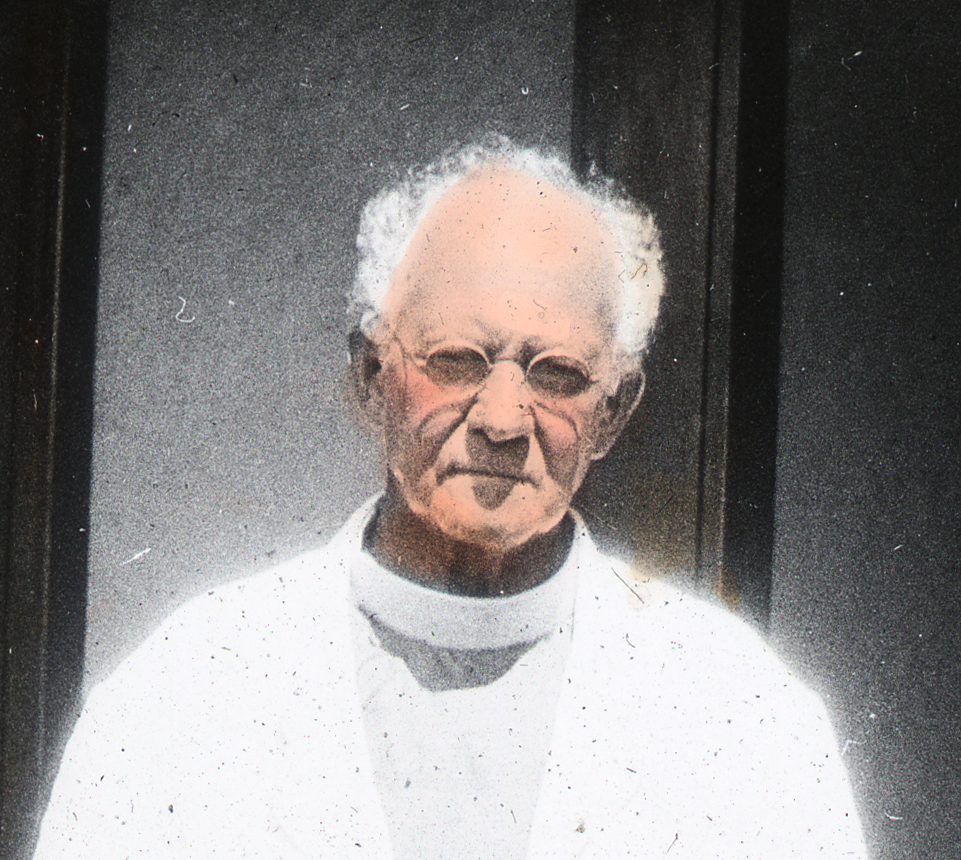
- Bishop Newton c. 1936 (colorised)
- Church: Church of England in Australia
- Diocese: New Guinea
- In office: 1922–1936
- Predecessor: Gerald Sharp
- Successor: Philip Strong
- Other posts: Bishop of Carpentaria, 1915–1922

Orders
- Ordination: 1891
- Consecration: 1915

Personal details
- Born: 5 January 1866 Buckland, Victoria
- Died: September 25, 1947 (aged 81)
- Education: St. Paul's College, Sydney; Merton College, Oxford

Henry Newton (5 January 1866 – 25 September 1947) was an Anglican colonial bishop who served two Southern Hemisphere dioceses in the first half of the 20th century.

== Early life ==
Newton was born Henry Wilkinson, the son of Thomas Wilkinson and his wife Anne (née Magney), in Buckland, near Beechworth, Victoria. In 1876 he was adopted by the Rev. Frederick Robert Newton, and subsequently took his surname.

== Clerical career ==
He was educated at St. Paul's College, Sydney and Merton College, Oxford. Ordained in 1891, after a curacy at St John's, Hackney he returned to the Antipodes where he became priest at St Agnes's Church, Esk, Queensland, and then a missionary in New Guinea. From 1915 to 1922 he was the second Bishop of Carpentaria. During his term as bishop, St Paul's Theological College, Moa, was opened for native students to train for ordination, and in 1919 he ordained the first two Torres Strait Islanders to become deacons, Poey Passi and Joseph Lui. Translated to New Guinea in 1922, he retired in 1936.

== Honours ==
In 1935, he was awarded the King George V Silver Jubilee Medal. He was one of six recipients from the region. After his death, Newton Theological College was renamed in his honour.

Religious titles
Preceded by Gilbert White	Bishop of Carpentaria; 1915–1922	Succeeded by Stephen Davies
Preceded by Gerald Sharp	Bishop of New Guinea; 1922–1936	Succeeded by Philip Strong
