= Stephen Davies (bishop) =

Australian bishop (1883–1961)

Stephen Harris Davies (1881–1961) was the third Anglican Bishop of Carpentaria based on Thursday Island. Queensland, Australia.

== Early life ==
Davies was born in 1883 and educated at St. John's School, Leatherhead, and Emmanuel College, Cambridge.

== Religious life ==
Davies was ordained in 1909. After a curacy at St Matthew's, Holbeck he emigrated to Australia where he joined the Bush Brotherhood of St Paul in Charleville, Queensland, serving as its head until his ordination to the episcopate. In 1925 he ordained the first two Torres Strait Islanders to become priests, Poey Passi and Joseph Lui.

== Later life ==
Davies retired in 1949 and died on 29 November 1961. There is a memorial to him at St Michael, Waters Upton.

Religious titles
Preceded by Henry Newton	Bishop of Carpentaria; 1922–1949	Succeeded by Wilfrid John Hudson
