= Frederick Robert Newton =

Anglican minister and schoolmaster

Frederick Robert Newton (1841–1926) was an Anglican minister and schoolmaster.

== Biography ==
Frederick Newton was born in Nailsea, England, to Robert and Elizabeth Newton in 1841. He was educated in Neuwied, Germany, and first came to Sydney, Australia, in 1858. He taught mathematics in Eaglesfield, and in 1871 opened a Church of England Grammar School in Grafton with Rev. Josiah Spencer. In 1875 he opened a private boys school in Wollongbar. He worked as a minister in Casino, and was made deacon in 1876 and ordained in 1877, becoming the first incumbent of the new parish. He often worked without remuneration, traveling to different congregations scattered about the area. In 1878, he started another boys school in Lismore. From 1885 to 1893 Newton served as curate in a number of places. He continued serving the church and finally served as vicar in Nimbin before his retirement.

Although he remained unmarried until his death, he legally adopted the orphaned children of another cleric who had died, and took charge of the welfare and education of the three sons of Albert Dhalke, who had been murdered, as well as finding them employment. One of his adopted sons, Henry Newton, was educated in England and ordained to work with Frederick Newton in the Esk parish in Queensland; eventually becoming bishop of Carpentaria in 1915 and of New Guinea in 1922, and would write a booklet about the life of his adopted father with Robert L. Dawson.

Newton retired to Wollongbar where his brother lived, and died on April 23, 1926, at the age of 84.
