= Florence Griffiths Buchanan =

Australian missionary and teacher (1861–1913)

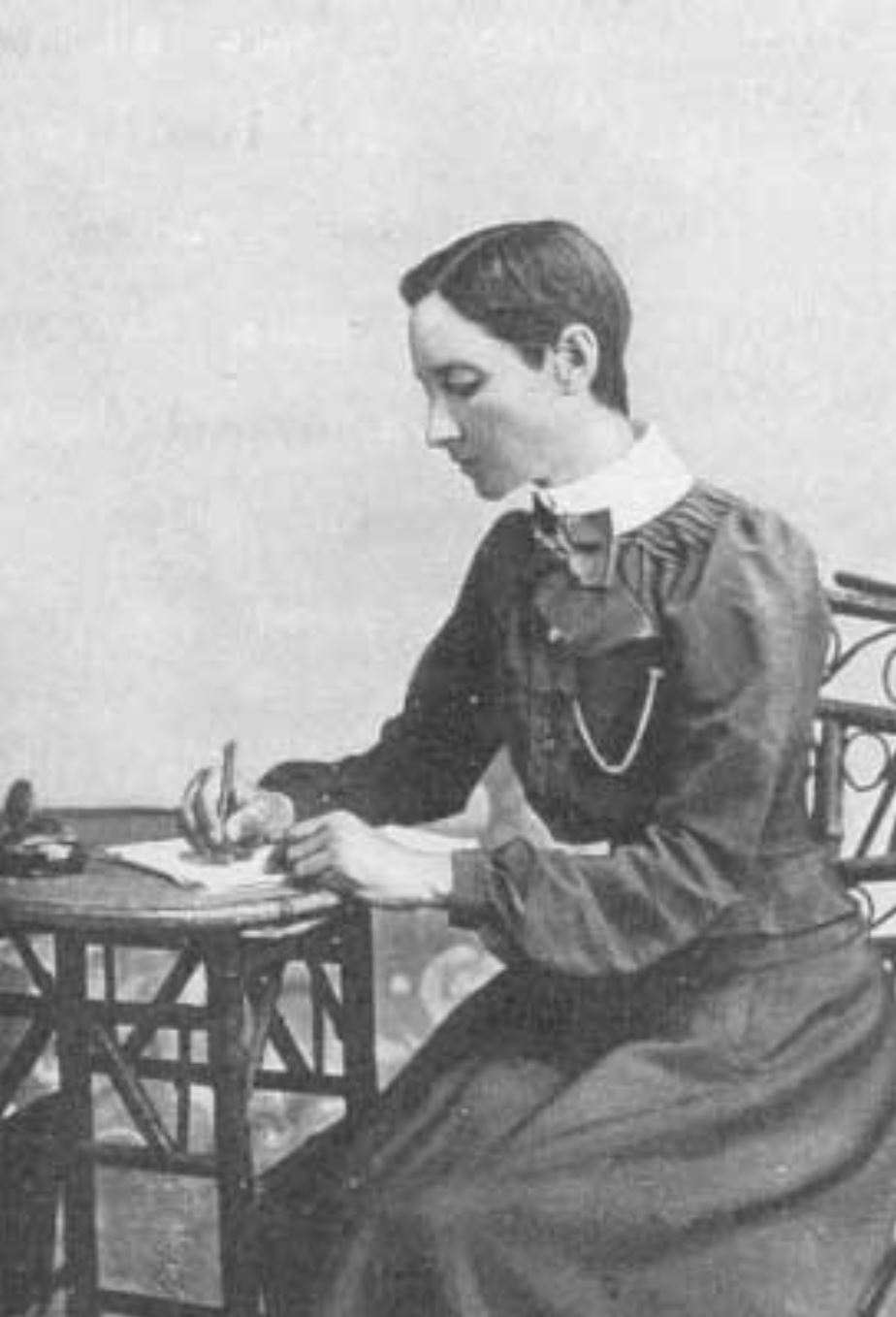
Deaconess Florence Griffiths Buchanan (1861–1913)

Florence Griffiths Buchanan (1861–1913) was a teacher and missionary in Queensland, Australia. She was known for her work and advocacy for the Melanesian and other Asian people.

== Biography ==
Buchanan was left permanently crippled after a riding accident in 1888.

After moving to Townsville to assist Anglican Bishop, Christopher George Barlow (1858–1915) in his diocese for two years, Buchanan moved to Thursday Island and worked among the multi-racial communities of divers. During the 1890s she worked on Thursday Island and was ordained there as a deaconess in 1908. In the same year, she went to Moa Island to conduct the St Paul's Anglican mission and teach school.

In 1911, she resigned from her position, due to ill-health, but continued to teach until her return to Brisbane in 1913.

She died of tuberculosis at St Helen's Methodist Hospital at South Brisbane. There is some uncertainty about her exact date of death being listed in the Queensland Death Registers as 30 December 1913, but her notices in various newspapers state she died the previous day 29 December 1913. Her funeral was held at St John's Anglican Cathedral in Brisbane on 31 December 1913 and afterwards she was buried in the Toowong Cemetery.

On 27 January 1914 at Thursday Island it was decided to raise funds to remember Buchanan who they regarded as a "splendid example of self sacrificing devotion" with a memorial window in the Quetta Cathedral on Thursday Island and to complete a project important to her, the erection of a hospital at St Paul's Mission on Moa Island. In July 1914 the window was ordered from England. The window was dedicated at the cathedral in November 1915.

== Legacy ==
A collection of approximately 50 letters written to Richard Griffiths of New Court, Hereford by members of his family, including correspondence relating to the wardship and subsequent upbringing of Florence Griffiths Buchanan is held at the State Library of Queensland (which is built on the site of St Helen's Methodist Hospital where she died).
