= John David Mathews =

John David Mathews PhD from Pennsylvania State University, 4/3/1947-10/2024 State College, PA was named Fellow of the Institute of Electrical and Electronics Engineers (IEEE) in 2012 for contributions to radar observations of meteors.
