= John Matthews (bishop) =

Bishop of Carpentaria from 1960 to 1968

Seering John Matthews OBE was the fifth Bishop of Carpentaria.

He was born on 26 March 1900, educated at St John's College, Auckland and Moore Theological College and ordained in 1926. After a curacy at Christ Church St Laurence, Sydney he was Priest in charge at St Mary's Fitzroy, Melbourne then Vicar of St James', Calcutta. From 1938 to 1942 he was Principal of the Bishop Westcott Boys' School in Namkum then a Royal Air Force Chaplain. After World War II he was Vicar of St Bartholomew's, Ipswich then Archdeacon of Rockhampton before his ordination to the episcopate. He died in 1978.

Anglican Communion titles
| Preceded by Wilfrid John Hudson | Bishop of Carpentaria; 1960–1968 | Succeeded by Ernest Eric Hawkey |
