= Tony Hall-Matthews =

Anthony Francis Berners "Tony" Hall-Matthews was the last Bishop of Carpentaria.

He was born into an ecclesiastical family on 14 November 1940 and educated at St Francis Theological College, Brisbane and James Cook University. He was ordained in 1966. After a curacy in Darwin he was chaplain of the Carpentaria Aerial Mission and then rector of Normanton. From 1976 to 1984 he was the Archdeacon of Cape York Peninsula when he was ordained to the episcopate: he was consecrated a bishop on 1 March 1984 at St John's Cathedral (Brisbane). Known as the "Flying Bishop" he retired effective 2 February 1996.

Anglican Communion titles
Preceded by Hamish Jamieson	Bishop of Carpentaria; 1984–1996	See dissolved
