= Eric Hawkey =

Ernest Eric Hawkey (1 June 1909 – 25 July 1986) was the sixth Bishop of Carpentaria, Australia, from 1968 to 1974.

He was educated at Trinity Grammar School, Sydney and ordained deacon in 1933 and priest in 1936. After curacies at St Alban's, Ultimo (1933-34) and St Paul's, Burwood (1934-40) he was Priest in charge at Kandos (1940-46) and then Rector (1946-47). From 1947 to 1968 he was Secretary of the Australian Board of Missions and from 1962 a Canon Residentiary at St John's Cathedral, Brisbane. He was consecrated a bishop on 23 April 1968 at St John's Cathedral (Brisbane). In 1970 he ordained the first Aborigine to become a priest, Patrick Brisbane.

Religious titles
Preceded by John Matthews	Bishop of Carpentaria; 1968–1974	Succeeded by Hamish Jamieson
