= John C. Matthews =

Union Army Medal of Honor recipient

John Calvin Matthews
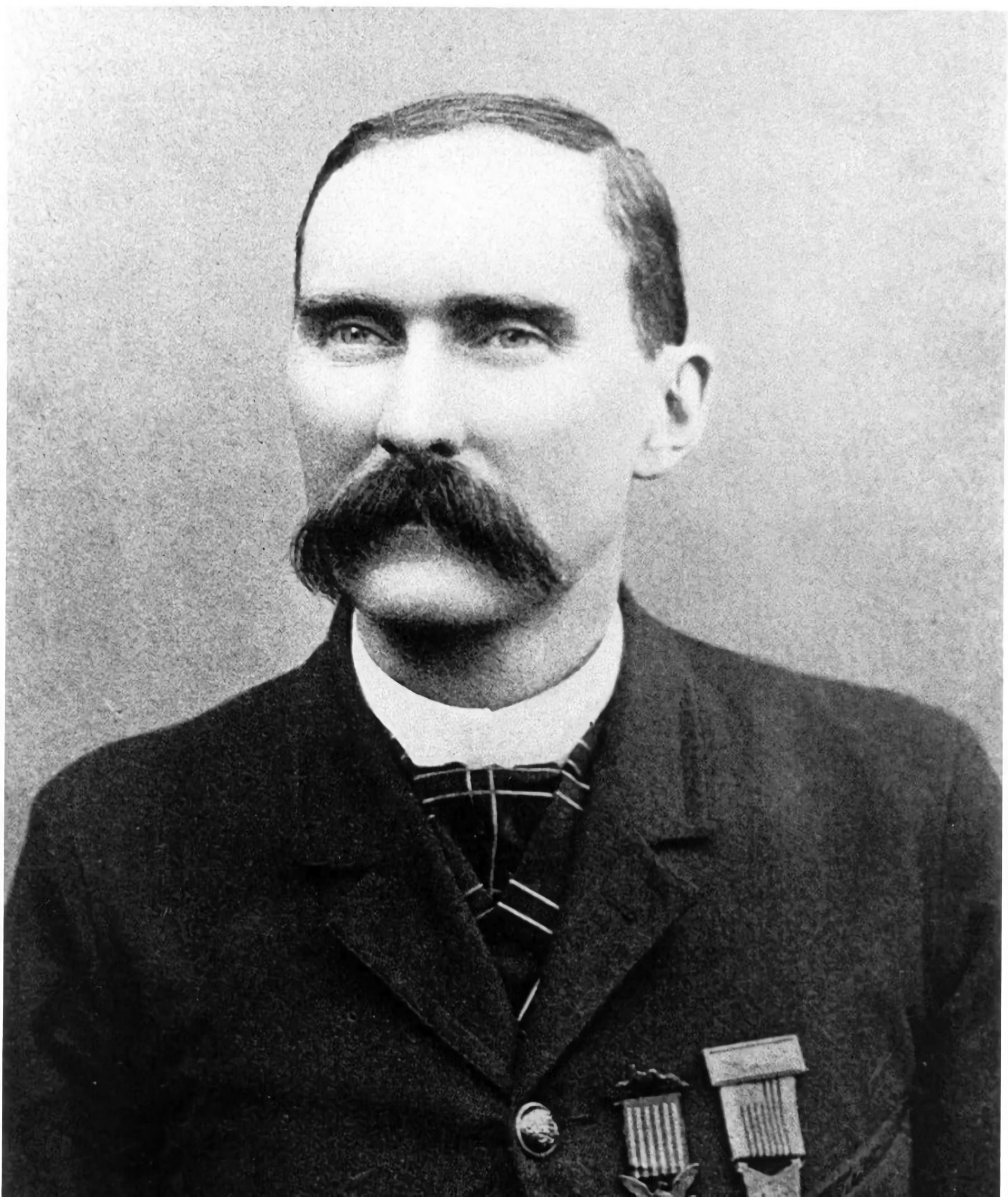
- Matthews in 1891
- Born: March 29, 1846; Westmoreland County, Pennsylvania, US
- Died: October 24, 1934 (aged 88); Akron, Ohio, US
- Burial place: Homewood Cemetery, Pittsburgh, Pennsylvania, US
- Military career
- Allegiance: United States; Union
- Branch: Union Army
- Service years: 1862 - 1865
- Rank: Corporal
- Units: Company A, 61st Pennsylvania Infantry
- Conflicts: American Civil War: Battle of Chancellorsville; Battle of Gettysburg; Bristoe Campaign; Mine Run Campaign; Battle of the Wilderness; Battle of Spotsylvania Court House; Battle of North Anna; Battle of Totopotomoy Creek; Battle of Cold Harbor; Siege of Petersburg; Battle of Fort Stevens; Third Battle of Winchester; Battle of Fisher's Hill; Battle of Cedar Creek; Appomattox Campaign; Third Battle of Petersburg; Battle of Appomattox Court House
- Awards: Medal of Honor

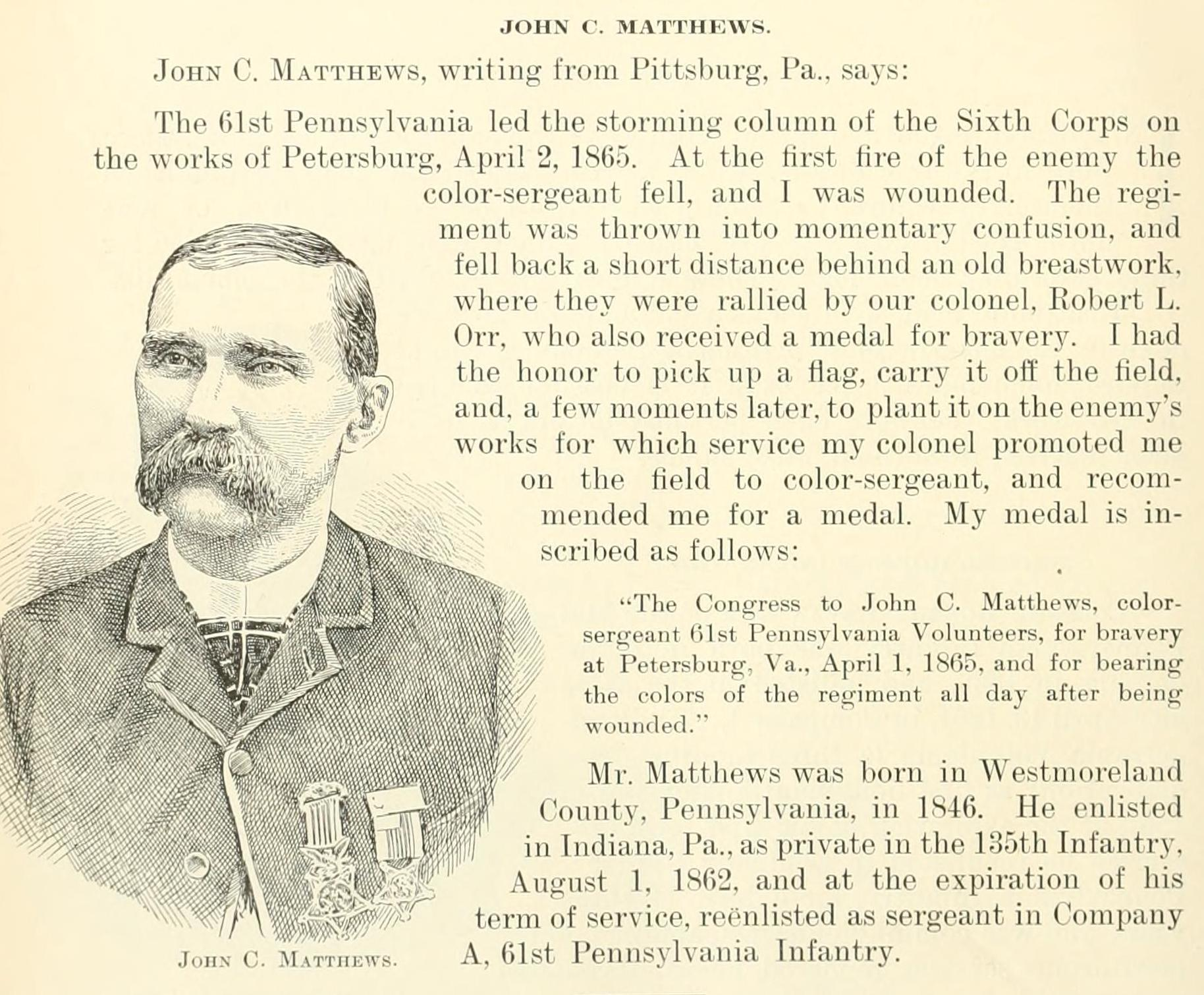
John Calvin Matthews of the 61st Pennsylvania Infantry, Civil War Congressional Medal of Honor recipient

John Calvin Matthews (August 9, 1841 – September 25, 1927) was a Union Army soldier in the American Civil War and a recipient of the United States military's highest decoration, the Medal of Honor, for his actions at the April 2, 1865 Third Battle of Petersburg, Virginia.

== Biography ==
Matthews joined as a private in Company A, 135th Pennsylvania (Nine Month) Volunteer Infantry on August 1, 1862, at age sixteen. He served on provost duty in Washington DC until February 1863 when the regiment joined the 1st Brigade, 3rd Division, I Corps, Army of the Potomac at Falmouth, Virginia. Wearing the blue circle of the 3rd Division of Reynold's I Corps, the regiment took part in the Chancellorsville Campaign. On May 24, 1863, the regiment mustered out of Federal service, and Matthews returned home to Westmoreland County as a veteran at seventeen-years-old. After eight months at home, almost six weeks shy of his eighteenth birthday, he reenlisted as a Corporal in Company A, 61st Pennsylvania Volunteer Infantry for a three-year term on 13 February 1864. Now wearing the white Greek Cross of the 2nd Division of Sedgwick's VI Corps, he served in the 61st until the end of the war when he mustered out as a sergeant on June 28, 1865. He was nineteen-years-old.

His service with the 61st led him to participate in the Overland Campaign, the Siege of Petersburg, Sheridan's Shanandoah Valley Campaign, and the Appommattox Campaign. He was wounded twice. The first was at the Battle of Cedar Creek during Sheridan's Valley Campaign. The second time was at the Breakthrough at Petersburg for which he was awarded the Medal of Honor. Carrying the state flag in the color guard, he was in the vanguard of the 61st as it led the VI Corps attack on 2 April 1865. At the first volley from the Rebel lines, the regimental Color Sergeant fell wounded. Matthews grabbed the regimental colors and carried both. The defenders' fire stalled the attack, and the regiment fell back behind some breastworks forward of their lines. MAJ Robert L. Orr took the state flag from Matthews and began yelling and waving to rally the attack. Matthews joined him and the two led the renewed advance into the Confederate positions that they captured. Matthews later wrote that "I had the honor to pick up a flag, carry it off the field, and, a few moments later, to plant it on the enemy's works for which service my colonel promoted me on the field to color-sergeant, and recommended me for a medal." He was one of five members of the 61st that earned the medal for their actions that day. The resultant victory combined with Sheridan's victory at Five Forks and Miles' victory at Sutherland's Station were breakthroughs that forced the evacuation of Petersburg and the Rebel retreat that ended with the surrender at Appomattox Court House.

After the war, Matthews returned to Pennsylvania still a teenager. That year, 1865, he married Asenath Work (1846-1942). They had four children, three of whom predeceased him. His Medal was awarded to him on February 13, 1891. He remained married to Asenath until his death in Akron, OH, at age 88 on 1934. He was buried in his family plot with three of his children at Homewood Cemetery in Pittsburgh.

== Medal of Honor citation ==
Matthews' official Medal of Honor citation reads:

The President of the United States of America, in the name of Congress, takes pleasure in presenting the Medal of Honor to Corporal John C. Matthews, United States Army, for extraordinary heroism on 2 April 1865, while serving with Company A, 61st Pennsylvania Infantry, in action at Petersburg, Virginia. Corporal Matthews voluntarily took the colors, whose bearer had been disabled, and, although himself severely wounded, carried the same until the enemy's works were taken.

== See also ==
- List of American Civil War Medal of Honor recipients
- 61st Pennsylvania Infantry Regiment
- Third Battle of Petersburg

== Bibliography ==
- Beyer, Walter F.; Beyer, Oscar F. (1905). Deeds of valor : How America's Civil War heroes won the Congressional Medal of Honor. Vol. I. Detroit, MI: The Perrien-Keydel Company. p. 612. hdl:2027/nyp.33433081908182. OCLC 1148790472.
- Brewer, Abraham Titus (1911). History Sixty-First Regiment Pennsylvania Folunteers, 1861-1865 (pdf) (1st ed.). Pittsburgh, PA: Pittsburgh, Art Engraving & Printing Co. pp. 134–135, 156, 230. OCLC 276860166.
- Subcommittee on Veterans' Affairs, United States. Congress. Senate. Committee on Labor and Public Welfare (1968). Edward M Kennedy, Chairman (ed.). Medal of Honor, 1863–1968 : "In the Name of the Congress of the United States". Committee print (United States. Congress), 90th Congress, 2nd session. Washington DC: U.S. Government Printing Office. p. 160. OCLC 1049691780.
- Wallace, Lew (1897). The story of American heroism (PDF) (1st ed.). Springfield, OH: J.W. Jones. p. 466. OCLC 276860166.
- "John Calvin Matthews". Congressional Medal of Honor Society. Congressional Medal of Honor Society. February 22, 2022.
- "John Calvin Matthews". The Wall of Valor Project. Hall of Valor: The Military Medals Database. August 8, 2020.
- "John Calvin Matthews". Medal of Honor Recipients. The Comprehensive Guide to the Victoria & George Cross. December 15, 2015.
- "Pennsylvania Volunteers of the Civil War". Pennsylvania Civil War Volunteers. January 1, 2015.
