= John Mathew (disambiguation) =

John Mathew (1849 – 1929) was an Australian Presbyterian minister and anthropologist.

John Mathew may also refer to:

- John Mathew (MP) for Shaftesbury

== See also ==
- John Mathews (disambiguation)
