= Gilbert White (bishop) =

Australian Anglican bishop (1859–1933)

The Right Reverend Gilbert White
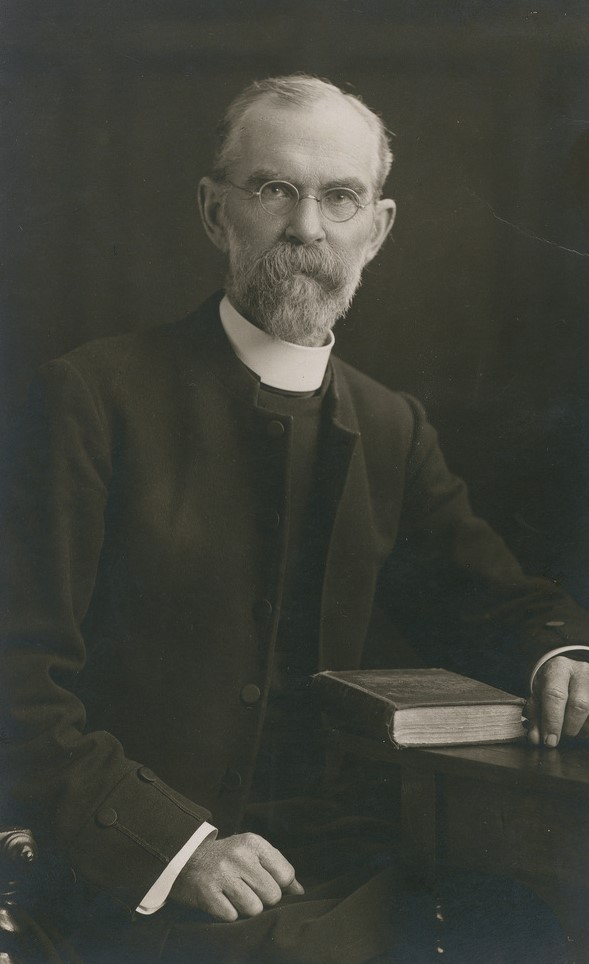
- Gilbert White
- Church: Church of England in Australia

Personal details
- Born: 9 June 1859 Rondebosch, South Africa
- Died: 1 April 1933 (aged 73)

Gilbert White (9 June 1859 – 1 April 1933) was an Anglican bishop who served two Australian dioceses for 25 years.

== Early life ==
Gilbert White was born on 9 June 1859 at Rondebosch, South Africa, the son of Francis Gilbert White, clergyman, and his wife Lucy (née Gilderdale). He was named after his great-grand-uncle, the naturalist.

White was educated at Fettes College and Oriel College, Oxford.

== Religious life ==
Ordained in 1883, after a curacy at Helston White emigrated to Australia where he became Rector of Charters Towers (1886), Herberton (1888) and Ravenswood (1891), all in Queensland. From 1890 to 1900 he was Archdeacon of North Queensland. He was raised to the episcopate in 1900 as the inaugural Bishop of Carpentaria. One of his first acts was to establish a small theological college, Bishop's College. In 1915, he translated to head up the new Willochra Diocese in South Australia.

== Later life ==
White retired in 1925. In the same year, he was the Australian representative at the World Conference of Life and Work, an ecumenical conference held in Stockholm.

He wrote poetry that reflected his love of nature. He also wrote three books about his travels in northern Australia.

Anglican Communion titles
New office	Bishop of Carpentaria; 1900–1915	Succeeded by Henry Newton
New office	Bishop of Willochra; 1915–1925	Succeeded by Richard Thomas
