= John Mathews (theologian) =

Indian New Testament scholar

- Born: 18 December 1952 (age 73); Kerala
- Education: Kerala University, ThiruvananthapuramB.A.; M.R.E.; Fordham University, New York UniversityPh.D.
- Parent: Father: Samuel Mathews
- Church: Indian (Malankara) Orthodox Church
- Writings: Commentary on Gospel of Saint Mark (in Malayalam); The Ecumenical Ideal and the New Testament Reality
- Title: Reverend Father Doctor

John Mathews (born 18 December 1952) is a New Testament scholar and Metropolitan of the Indian (Malankara) Orthodox Church.

John Mathews is the Secretary of the St. Thomas Orthodox Vaideeka Sangam, the Association of all Priests of the Malankara Orthodox Syrian Church as well as the publisher of Purohithar, a magazine published by the St. Thomas Orthodox Theological Group from Kottayam. He is the Co-Secretary of the joint commission between the Catholic Church and the Malankara Orthodox Syrian Church.

He teaches New Testament at the Orthodox Theological Seminary in Kottayam. He pursued doctoral studies in New Testament at the Fordham University, New York City. His doctoral dissertation was titled The Spirit-Paraclete in the testament of Jesus according to Saint John's Gospel. He was president of the Society for Biblical Studies in India from 2002 to 2004.

He was consecrated in 2010 with the name Yuhanon Mar Demetrius.
