= Quetta Memorial Precinct =

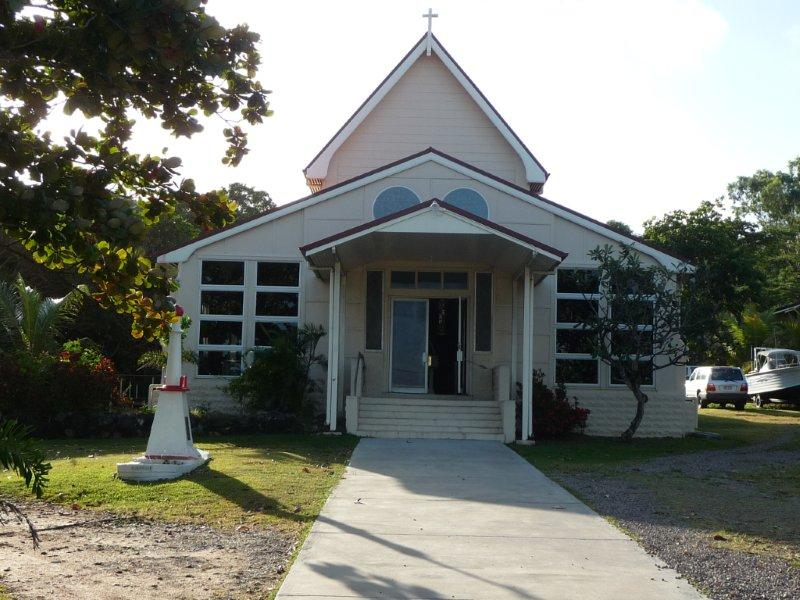
- Quetta Memorial Cathedral Church, 2014

- Location within Queensland
- 10.5838°S 142.2149°E
- Location: Douglas Street, Thursday Island, Shire of Torres, Queensland, Australia

History
- Design period: 1870s–1890s (late 19th century)
- Built: 1891; 135 years ago (original); 1965; 61 years ago (extended)

Queensland Heritage Register
- Official name: Quetta Memorial Precinct, All Souls and St Bartholomew's Cathedral Church and Quetta Memorial, Bishops House, St Bartholomew's Old Cathedral
- Type: state heritage (landscape, built)
- Designated: 27 July 2001
- Reference no.: 602168
- Significant period: 1890s–1900s (historical) ongoing (social)
- Significant components: tower – bell / belfry, memorial – plaque, church, garden/grounds, residential accommodation – rectory, residential accommodation – bishop's house, chapel, church hall/sunday school hall, furniture/fittings, memorial – other, stained glass window/s, objects (movable) – religion/worship, views to, college – ecclesiastical/theological, memorial – church

The Quetta Memorial Precinct is a heritage-listed Anglican church precinct in Douglas Street, Thursday Island, Shire of Torres, Queensland, Australia. The precinct comprises the All Souls and St Bartholomew's Cathedral Church, the Bishop's House, and the Church Hall. The precinct was built as a memorial to the 134 lives lost in the shipwreck of the RMS Quetta on 28 February 1890. The church was designed in 1892–1893 by architect John H. Buckeridge. It was added to the Queensland Heritage Register on 27 July 2001.

== History ==
The Quetta Memorial Precinct on Thursday Island was established in the early 1890s. The principal buildings on the site are:

- The Bishop's House (Bishop's College), erected in 1891 as the residence for the first rector of the Church of England parish of Thursday Island, and which in 1900 became the residence of the first Bishop of the Church of England Diocese of Carpentaria
- All Souls and St Bartholomew's Cathedral Church and Quetta Memorial, erected in stages between 1893 and 1964/65
- the Church Hall, erected in 1902–03 as the Parish Institute
- the Rectory, erected in 1904.

Thursday Island (indigenous name: Waiben) is located within the Prince of Wales (Muralag) group, just off the northwest tip of Cape York Peninsula. The original inhabitants of the Muralag islands, the Kaurareg people, shared some cultural characteristics with Cape York Aborigines and spoke the same basic language, Kala Lagaw Ya. However, the Kaurareg were a maritime people who lived from harvesting the sea, shifting camp sites regularly. Waiben had a restricted water supply, and it is thought that no permanent Kaurareg settlement was established there.

During the first half of the 19th century, British shipping began to make regular use of Torres Strait, entering into a passing trade with the Islanders. Colonial occupation commenced in the 1860s and 1870s with the arrival of beche-de-mer crews, pearl-shellers, Protestant missionaries from the southwestern Pacific, and government officials.

Queensland had no jurisdiction over the Torres Strait until its annexation in 1872 of the islands of the southern half of the Strait, a measure intended largely to protect Queensland interests in the pearl-shelling and beche-de-mer fisheries in the Strait and along the Barrier Reef, and to regulate the employment of South Sea Islanders in these enterprises. At annexation, Torres Strait Islanders acquired the same official status as mainland Aborigines.

In 1877, the official Queensland Government settlement at Somerset on Cape York Peninsula (established 1864) was moved to the newly surveyed town of Port Kennedy on the southern side of Thursday Island. The new location provided a sheltered, deepwater anchorage, and was more centrally located along the main shipping route through the inner channel of Torres Strait, the principal trade route to Asia and the northern route to England. In 1879, at British Colonial Office direction, Queensland jurisdiction was extended to the islands of the northern half of the Torres Strait.

The first Christian missionaries to establish a presence in the Torres Strait were associated with the London Missionary Society. From 1871, as the first step in bringing Christianity to Papual New Guinea, the society began to land its Pacific Islander teachers (mostly from the Loyalty Islands) in the Torres Strait, at Erub (Darnley Island), Tutu (Warrior Island) and Dauan (Cornwallis) islands in July 1871, and at Mabuiag (Jervis)), Moa (Banks), Massid (Yorke) and Saibai islands in 1872. These lay teachers brought an indigenised form of Protestantism to the Torres Strait, reinforced the status of the Strait's Pacific Islander maritime workers, and paved the way for European missionaries. From 1871 to the mid-1880s, Congregational missionary the Rev. Dr Samuel MacFarlane headed the western division of the London Missionary Society's New Guinea mission. He was based initially at Erub, then moved to Dauan, where he established a school for island boys.

Torres Strait Islanders now refer to the arrival of the Christian missionaries in the Torres Strait in July 1871 as "the coming of the light", a cause for celebration and memorial:

"For generations of Islanders the arrival of the missionaries has marked the divide between darkness and light. They brought deliverance from a life most preferred to forget, certain aspects of which had become anathema to their religion, and to their idea of themselves as a civilised people. . . . Just lately the Islanders have begun to look back on bipotaim (time prior to the coming of the missionaries in 1871) more favourably, and while they remain devoutly Christian, a growing number now seek in elements of the pre-colonial culture the means to reaffirm their identity as Torres Strait Islanders and so strengthen their sense of community."

By the mid-1880s, nearly the whole of the Torres Strait Islander population was nominally Christian. French Catholic missionaries established a presence on Thursday Island in 1884–85, but Protestantism was well-established in the Torres Strait by this date.

In 1878, shortly after the establishment of permanent settlement on Thursday Island in 1877, the Church of England Diocese of North Queensland separated from the Diocese of Sydney, with the Right Rev. George Henry Stanton consecrated as the first bishop. The new diocese constituted a vast area of about 300,000 square miles, bounded on the west by the Queensland–South Australian border, on the south by latitude 22°S, on the east by the ocean, and encompassing the islands of the Torres Strait.

Anglican services on Thursday Island were held initially at the Court House, conducted by lay preachers and occasional visiting clergy. In 1885–1886 a substantial block of land in the main street, bounded by Douglas (formerly Tully), Jardine and Chester Streets, and adjacent to the Catholic missionaries, was vested in the Synod of the Diocese of North Queensland for church purposes. In April 1887, the first Anglican church committee on Thursday Island met to arrange for regular visits from a Church of England curate, and in June a church building fund was established. Little more was accomplished, however, until a tragic shipwreck in the Torres Strait in 1890 proved a catalyst for the construction of an Anglican church on Thursday Island.

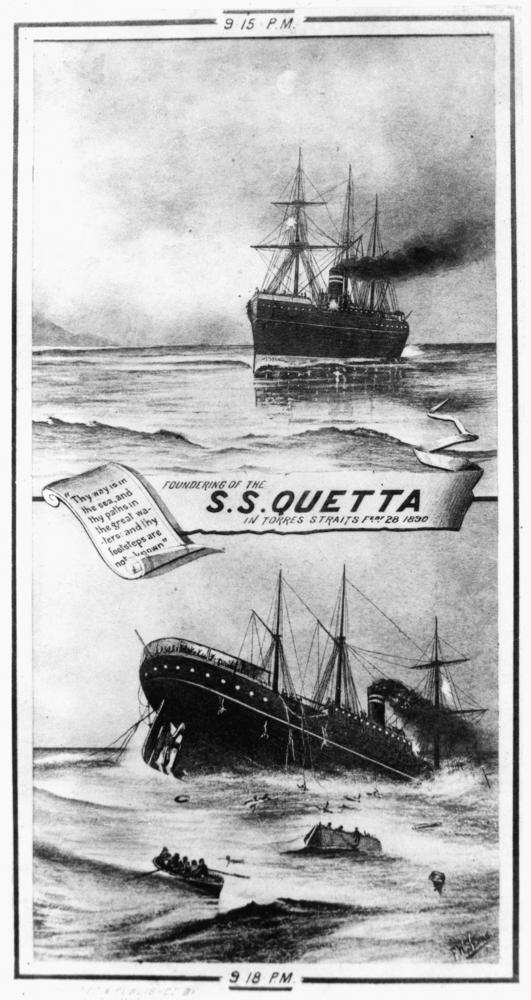
Illustration of the sinking of the RMS Quetta, 1890

On the night of 28 February 1890, the British mail and passenger ship RMS Quetta struck an uncharted rock in the Adolphus Channel, off Albany Island, and sank with the loss of 133 lives. It remains one of Queensland's and Australia's worst maritime disasters. The ship was en route to Britain, and carried nearly 300 passengers, many of them from prominent Queensland families. Most of the Europeans on board were drowned, and the loss was felt throughout colonial Queensland.

Shortly after the accident a visiting Anglican priest, the Rev. AA Maclaren, conducted a burial service over the site of the wreck of the Quetta. At a meeting of the Thursday Island Church of England Committee on 10 April 1890, Rev. Maclaren proposed that members of the Anglican Church be invited to subscribe to the erection of a church on Thursday Island, as a memorial to those lost in the Quetta. The idea was put to a general meeting of Thursday Island's Anglican congregation, held at the courthouse on 20 July 1890 and chaired by Bishop Stanton, where it was resolved:

That in the opinion of this meeting, it is desirable that a Church and Parsonage be erected on Thursday Island; the Church to be a fitting memorial of those who were lost in the wreck of the "Quetta" on the night of February the 28th last, and that the Church Committee take the necessary steps for carrying this into effect.

Some discussion ensued as to whether the memorial should be a Union Church, but only an Anglican church could be erected on Church of England property.

The first step was to attract a resident minister. In 1891 a rectory was built from locally raised subscriptions. Situated on the high ground of the Church of England property, at the northeast end of the site, the rectory was highset on timber stumps, of exposed timber stud-framing, lined with deep chamferboards, and surrounded by verandahs. It had a centrally positioned front door, and french doors with fanlights opening onto the front verandah. Once the rectory was completed, Rev. William Maitland Woods was installed as the first incumbent clergyman of the parish of Thursday Island, and canvassing began for funds for construction of a Memorial Church – a durable edifice, of artistic proportions, worthy of its commemorative intentions. Nearly £1600 was subscribed at this first appeal, from all over Australia and from Britain, and not restricted to Anglicans. Thursday Island's Presbyterians were particularly supportive of the project.

After considering the cost of brick or stone, the Church Building Committee decided that the memorial church should be constructed in concrete, and commissioned a design from John Hingeston Buckeridge, Brisbane's Anglican diocesan architect from February 1887 until 1902. Buckeridge designed about 60 churches in southern Queensland and later church and mission buildings in British New Guinea. Like many Queensland architects, he was declared bankrupt in 1892, following the collapse of the building industry during the depression of the early 1890s, and moved from Brisbane to Sydney. He prepared the design for the Quetta Memorial Church in 1892–1893, most likely from Sydney. The original design was for a Gothic Revival style building with chancel, nave of 5 bays in length, aisles, bell tower spire, vestries, and side entrances. However, like many Queensland churches, the Quetta Memorial Church was constructed in stages, as funds became available, and was never completed as originally designed.

The Hon. John Douglas, Government Resident at Thursday Island and a staunch supporter of the project, laid the foundation stone on 24 May 1893. Six months later, on 12 November 1893, the completed sanctuary/chancel (built to slightly smaller dimensions than the original design) was consecrated by the Right Rev. Dr Christopher Barlow, the second Bishop of North Queensland, as All Souls Quetta Memorial Church. At this time Douglas made an appeal for the Bishop to permit clergymen of other Protestant denominations to conduct services in the church, but the Bishop made no formal statement on this.

By mid-1895 the chancel and four-fifths of the nave had been completed. The concrete side arches to the nave had been constructed, but were clad externally with temporary timber boarding, until the aisles could be built. A skillion-roofed timber vestry had been erected on the western side of the church, off the chancel. There was no debt on the building, but the Church Building Committee was anxious to complete Buckeridge's design, and a second appeal for funds was launched in 1895. At this time the church was promoted as a focus for missionary work in the Diocese of North Queensland, and already attracted numbers of Japanese and South Sea Islanders – groups prominent in the Torres Strait pearl-shell industry. At the same time the Bishop of North Queensland, Dr Barlow, was working toward the establishment of a new far northern diocese, the centre of which was likely to be at Thursday Island – in which case the Quetta Memorial Church would become a cathedral.

It appears that by 1901 the aisles had been constructed, but in timber, which was a temporary measure. These had lancet windows along the sides, as in Buckeridge's original design. The building seated about 250 persons, in wooden chairs rather than pews, was already a place of pilgrimage, and something of a tourist attraction. A number of relics from the wreck of the Quetta were displayed, and there were various memorials to persons who had died in, or had been saved from, the Quetta, as well as relics or memorials to other Torres Strait shipwrecks. The association of the place with the Torres Strait, and with the sea, was very strong.

In the second half of the 1890s Bishop Barlow travelled to England, where he raised £10,000 as a minimum endowment for a new diocese, which produced a small annual income of £300. On 3 August 1900, the Anglican Diocese of Carpentaria was created, encompassing the Torres Strait, Cape York Peninsula, the Southern Gulf of Carpentaria and the whole of the Northern Territory. In Queensland the boundary of the new diocese extended to south of Port Douglas, with Cairns remaining in the Diocese of North Queensland. There was no large population centre in the whole of the new diocese. Access was principally by sea, and so Thursday Island, centrally located on a major shipping route, was chosen as the seat of the Bishop. The Ven. Gilbert White, Archdeacon of North Queensland, was consecrated as the first Bishop of the Missionary Diocese of Carpentaria, at St Andrew's Cathedral, Sydney, on St Bartholomew's Day, 24 August 1900, and was installed at Thursday Island on 18 November 1900. At this time the All Souls' Quetta Memorial Church became the All Souls' Cathedral Church and Quetta Memorial.

Thursday Island parishioners agreed that the bishop should be appointed dean of the cathedral, with a sub-dean to be appointed to take charge of parochial matters. The cathedral was also to be used for parochial purposes. The existing rectory was to be taken over by the diocese as the See House, or Bishop's House, and a new residence was to be provided for the clergyman of the Thursday Island parish.

The new bishop had a formidable task ahead, and little funding. Fearing that it would be difficult to attract clergy to the diocese, he proposed to establish a diocesan theological training college on Thursday Island. This was made possible following an undertaking by Lord Beauchamp, Governor of New South Wales, to support three students at the Theological Training College for three years, from 1 January 1901. The Primate of Australia and others contributed towards a fourth studentship. The new theological college was known as Bishop's College, and was established in the See House on Thursday Island, which in late 1900-early 1901 was enlarged to 11 rooms, providing accommodation for 4 college students, as well as the Bishop and the Thursday Island rector. It is likely that the side and rear verandahs were first enclosed at this stage, and there was an ecclesiastical arched timber balustrade to the front verandah by this date. Bishop White travelled widely through his diocese, and the See House on Thursday Island was used primarily as the Bishop's College. In 1903, Lord Beauchamp renewed his support, but the college closed in 1907 following the establishment of a parochial theological college at Nundah.

In 1901 Bishop White also attempted to establish a School for Girls in the Japanese Schoolroom at Thursday Island. A number of Japanese were very active in the Church of England on Thursday Island in the late 1890s. By January 1901 some Anglican services were being conducted in Japanese (through an interpreter), and the Japanese community had erected a small building known as the Japanese Schoolroom on Church of England property. Little is known about this building, but it seems to have been used mainly for conducting evening English classes. The building also served on occasions as a venue for Church meetings. Whether or not the venue was the deterrent, the Girls' School was not supported, and closed within a few months.

In the early 1900s both the Bishop and the local parish worked to improve the Church of England premises on Thursday Island. In the period 1901–1904 a parish hall and a new rectory were erected, the whole of the church ground was fenced, a belltower was built, renovations were made to the Japanese Schoolroom, and additions were made to the South Sea Home – both the latter established on Church property in the 1890s.

By January 1902, with Bishop White's encouragement, the local parish had decided to erect a Parish Institute, a purpose-designed church hall in which to hold parochial meetings, social gatherings, church society meetings, a Sunday School, etc. The construction of this hall was considered essential to the expansion of the work of the parish. Funds were raised in 1902, tenders were called in October that year, and the foundation stone was laid by Hon. John Douglas, Government Resident and a Church of England warden, on 8 November 1902. The building was of timber construction, and measured 50 by 25 feet (15.2 by 7.6 m), with a 9-foot (2.7 m) deep verandah along front and sides. It was designed by John Hamilton Park, of Cairns, who had trained as an architect under FDG Stanley in the 1880s, and who in 1899 was foreman for the construction of military works on Thursday Island, where he also practised as an architect for a short period. The building was erected by contractors Byres and Young, of Thursday Island, and was officially opened by Bishop White on 21 January 1903.

Other ground improvements during the first half of 1903 included the construction of a belfry tower (with a bell purchased from Townsville), and the enclosure of the cathedral grounds with a picket fence of "gothic design" along Douglas Street, and wire netting at the rear of the property. The Japanese also raised funds to improve their school.

In October 1903 a deputation of prominent Thursday Island citizens, including the Hon. John Douglas, petitioned Bishop White to allow visiting clergymen of other denominations to preach at the cathedral. The claim was made on the grounds that other denominations, particularly the Presbyterians, had contributed significantly to the construction of the Quetta Memorial Church in the 1890s. The Bishop deliberated over this, but having studied early minutes, it was clear that the original intention had been to erect an Anglican church, and in December 1903 he refused the petition. In February 1904 the Bishop modified his position by offering visiting ministers the use of the parish institute, but he would not be moved on the issue of use of the cathedral.

In 1904 a new timber rectory was built in the church grounds, completed to accommodate a new minister and his wife who arrived on Thursday Island in September. Also, by October 1904, the South Sea Home, apparently situated on the Church of England property, had been extended.

A description of the Anglican community on Thursday Island in 1905 reveals a multi-cultural community, whose economy and culture were connected closely with the sea:

The congregation of the cathedral is an interesting one, comprising soldiers from the garrison, pearl-shellers, visitors from ships, South Sea Island and Japanese communicants, in addition to the white population, and often a detachment of native Christians from Mobiag or one of the other Torres Straits islands. Special prayer is offered daily for "those engaged in fishing, travelling, or doing their business in the great waters," and few strangers visit Thursday Island without a pilgrimage to the cathedral and its relics of the dangers of the deep.

Following the death of the Hon. John Douglas in 1904, it was decided to complete in concrete the northeast aisle of the cathedral as the Douglas Memorial Chapel, to serve for daily services and devotional meetings. Plans were commissioned from JH Buckeridge, but fund raising for this project took many years. The chapel was finally opened on St Peter's Day, 29 June 1913. It contained a memorial stained glass window executed by Kayll and Reed of Leeds, of an elderly St John (in the likeness of John Douglas) at Patmos, which was donated by Torres Strait Islanders. Almost immediately, fundraising began for completion of the southwest aisle, which was opened on 20 June 1915. The new aisles deviated from Buckeridge's 1892 design, in that they now had rows of paired, lancet-shaped arched doors along the sides, which when opened, made the cathedral extremely light and cool.

A number of memorials were placed in the cathedral in the early years of the 20th century. These included:

- a marble plaque in memory of over 300 persons lost during the cyclone of 5 March 1899, which decimated the pearl-shell fleet and light-station staff off the east coast of Cape York Peninsula.
- a marble font dedicated on 9 November 1902 to the London Missionary Society missionaries Rev. James Chalmers and Rev. Oliver Tomkins, who were killed in British New Guinea in 1901. Rev. Chalmers had worked for many years in New Guinea, was well known in the Torres Strait and at Thursday Island, and the subscription for the memorial font was raised from amongst all sectors of the Thursday Island community, not just Anglicans. The original marble columns were replaced in 1973.
- a memorial brass tablet in honour of Hugh Milman, unveiled on 7 October 1913: IN MEMORY OF HUGH MILMAN, Government Resident at Thursday Island, who served Queensland faithfully for thirty years. He was kind of heart, true to his friends, and an earnest supporter of this Church, which he served as Parochial Councillor and Churchwarden. He died 23 September 1911.
- two memorial stained glass windows, ordered from England, dedicated in November 1915. One was in memory of Deaconess Buchanan, well known in northern Queensland at the time; the other was in memory of Mr and Mrs Alexander Archer, who were drowned in the Quetta. Mr Archer was an inspector with the Bank of New South Wales in Brisbane, and the memorial was subscribed to by senior members of the bank staff.

Late in 1914 the London Missionary Society approached the Bishop of Carpentaria with a request that the Diocese take over the society's Torres Strait Mission. The offer was accepted, and the hand-over was formalised in March 1915. On 1 July 1915 the Rev JJE Done was appointed to take charge of the Mission, establishing his headquarters on Mabuiag Island. In September a second priest was appointed to St Paul's on Moa Island (established c. 1906) and in 1917 a third priest was stationed at Darnley Island, taking over Darnley, Murray, Stephens and Massig (Yorke) islands. As Torres Strait Islanders converted from Congregational to Anglican practices, All Souls' Cathedral Church and Quetta Memorial became increasingly the focus of religious life in the Torres Strait.

During the Second World War most of the civilian population of Thursday Island was evacuated to the mainland, and the Island became a garrison town. During this period services continued to be held at the cathedral, and oral history suggests that the church hall was requisitioned for military purposes.

The 1960s was a period of change within the Diocese of Carpentaria. The front of the cathedral was extended in 1964–1965, but not to Buckeridge's original concept. In 1965 St Bartholomew was declared the patron saint of the cathedral, which became known as The Cathedral Church of All Souls and St Bartholomew (Quetta Memorial). In 1968 the Diocese of the Northern Territory separated from the Diocese of Carpentaria, and around this time the Bishop's House on Thursday Island was renovated, with substantial internal changes.

Memorials placed in the cathedral in the late 20th century include a timber screen of very fine traditional Islander work, carved by Abia Ingui of Boigu Island, which was placed between the Blessed Sacrament Chapel and the low altar in 1989. Vibrant stained glass windows, designed by artist Oliver Cowley, were placed in the clerestory in the 1980s. In 1989 the cathedral was re-roofed.

In 1996, after nearly a century, the Diocese of Carpentaria was re-absorbed by the Diocese of North Queensland. At this time the Bishop's House on Thursday Island was vacated. The cathedral still provides an important focus for the Anglican parishes of the Torres Strait, which today comprise Bamaga, Coconut Island, Darnley & Stephen Islands, Kubin & Moa Islands, Mabuiag, Murray Island, Saibai & Dauan Islands, Thursday Island, and Yorke Island.

All Souls' and St Bartholomew's Cathedral Church (Quetta Memorial) remains a focus not only for Christian worship and ceremony in the Torres Strait, but also for Torres Strait Islander identity, and plays a leadership role in the community. The ceremonial signing of the Torres Strait Regional Agreement, along with a special church service, were celebrated here on 1 July 1994, a date co-inciding with the annual celebration of the "Coming of the Light" (the arrival of Christian missionaries to the Strait on 1 July 1871). A strong spirituality and sense of self-determination are considered by many Torres Strait Islanders to be the two pillars of local society: if one is missing, the community is "unbalanced".

== Description ==
The Anglican precinct on Thursday Island is located at the southwest end of the island, in the oldest section of the town, one street back from the foreshore. The site is bounded by on the southeast by Douglas (formerly Tully) Street, on the southwest by Jardine Street, on the northwest by Chester Street, and on the northeast by the Catholic precinct. The land slopes slightly toward the southeast and the Douglas Street frontage, which has a low concrete fence extending in front of the church and church hall grounds. Several houses at the southwest end of the site, although church property, are not included in the heritage listing.

The principal structures on the site include:

- the Bishop's House (1891)
- All Souls' and St Bartholomew's Cathedral Church (Quetta Memorial) (1893–1965)
- the Church Hall (1902–03)
- the Rectory (1904).

The grounds contain a number of memorials, a bell tower, mature plantings, garden paths, stone-edged gardens and fencing.

=== The Church ===
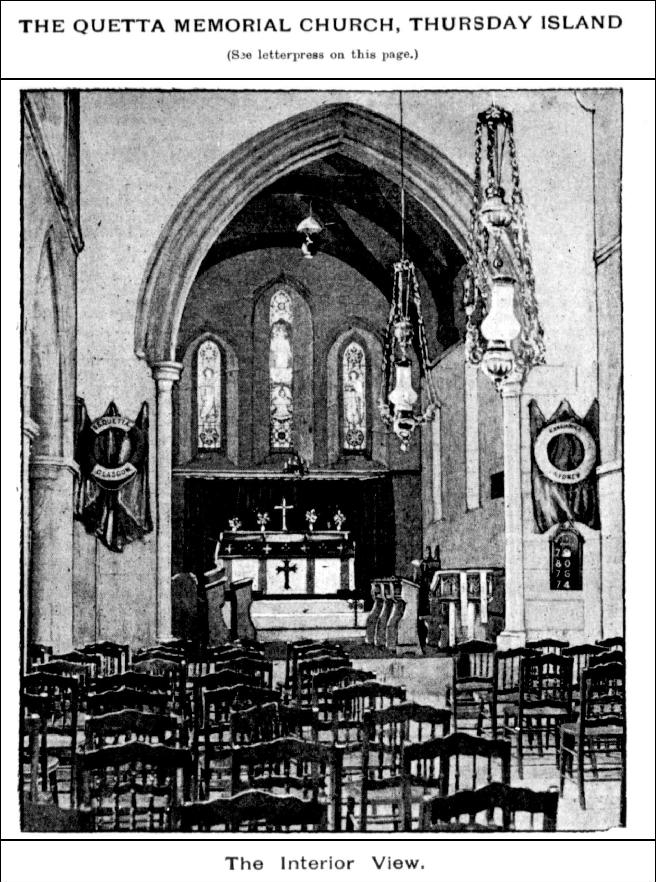
Interior of Quetta Memorial Church, Thursday Island, 1895

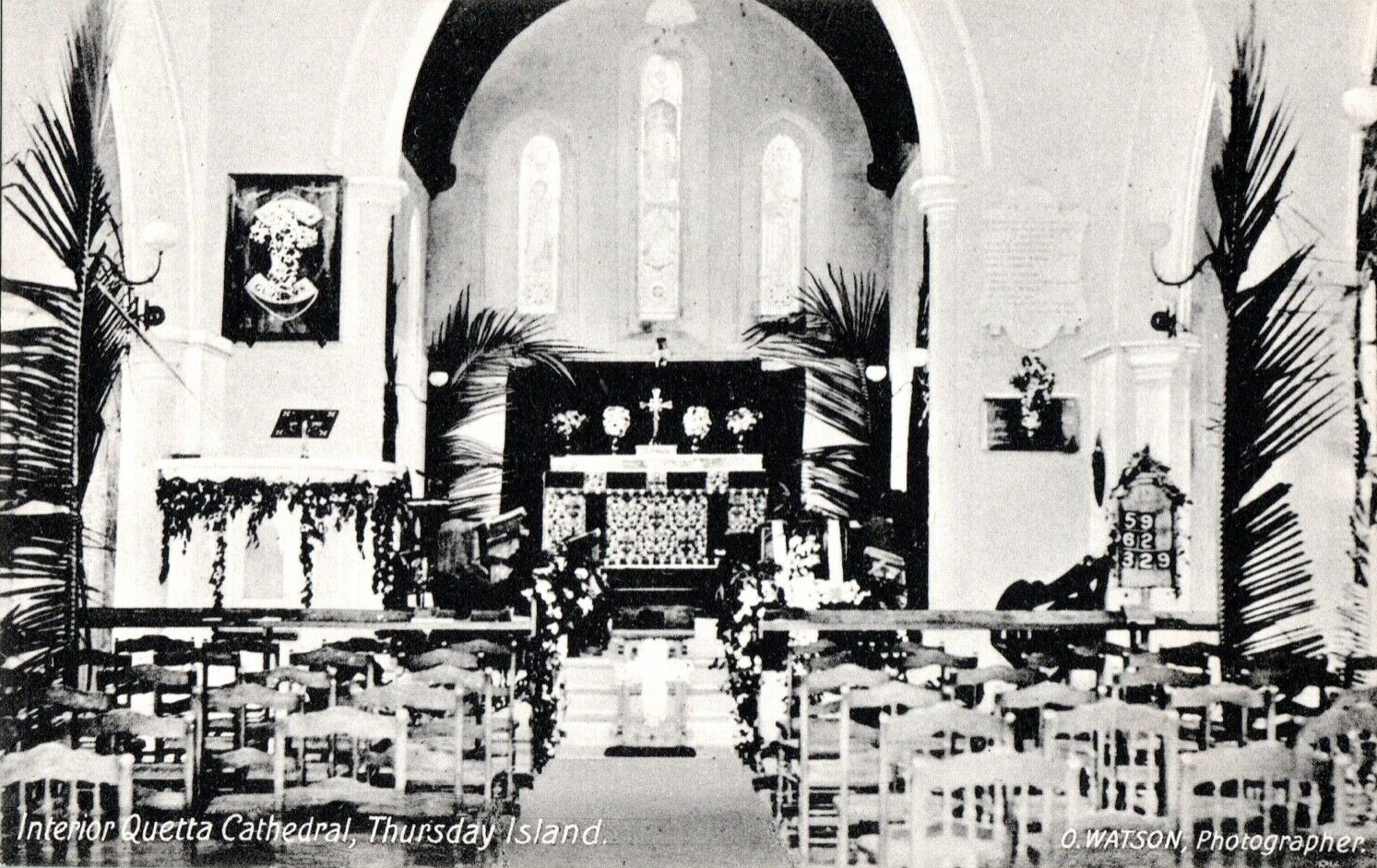
Interior of the cathedral, early 1900s

The Quetta Memorial is a late 19th/early 20th century Gothic Revival style church in mass concrete, rendered to resemble stonework, with a 1960s front extension of concrete and fibrous cement sheeting. The whole rests on concrete foundations.

The chancel/sanctuary and the earliest section of the nave are housed under separate, steeply pitched, gabled roofs which have late 20th century corrugated iron roof cladding. Typical of this style of church design, the chancel/sanctuary roof is lower than that of the nave, but, unusually for an Anglican church, is at the northwest end of the building, such that the entrance to the nave is from the southeast, which faces Douglas Street, the main street in the town of Thursday Island. The earliest section of the nave is four bays in length, with a clerestory. The southeast gabled end of the nave has later sheeting, mimicking timber boarding, and replacing earlier weatherboards. The nave has a single-storeyed, skillion-roofed aisle along either side, in which the bays are articulated by concrete piers, and with pairs of lancet-shaped arched timber doors in each bay. The southwest aisle extends to incorporate a vestry, accessed off the chancel/sanctuary. Windows in the clerestory, sanctuary, chancel and at the ends of the aisles, are lancet-shaped and have fixed stained-glass memorial panels.

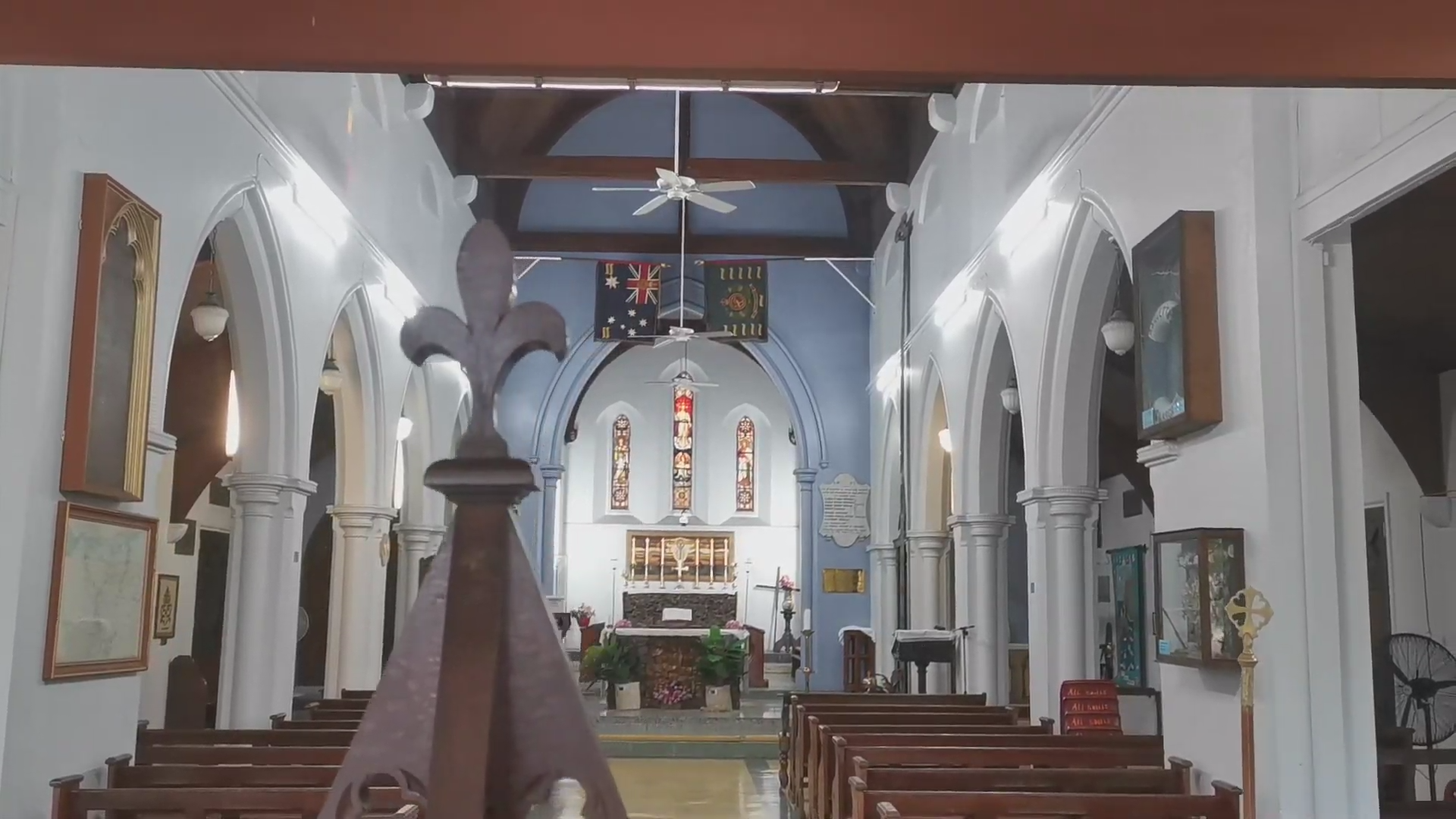
Interior of the Cathedral situated towards the entrance looking towards the altar, September 2023.

There is a 1960s addition to the front (southeast), which extends the nave and aisles by two and a half bays. It does not replicate the earlier structure, having a distinctive style and separate form, with a single roof, much less steeply pitched than that of the earlier nave, and considerably lower, extending across both nave and aisles. The side walls of this extension are of concrete with articulated bays. On either side, the bay closest to the original nave has a square headed timber door with a fixed stained glass panel (rectangular) above. There are casement windows in the next bay, on either side, again with a stained-glass panel above. The front of this extension is timber-framed with fibrous cement sheeting and cover-strips, and has a pair of centrally positioned, aluminium-framed glass entrance doors, with stained glass memorial windows either side. There is a small, cantilevered, ply-covered awning over the front doors, and above this are two round windows with fixed stained-glass panels. These both feature ship motifs. On either side of the entrance is a bank of clear-glass, hopper windows. Internally, the early section of the nave has a high open ceiling, timber lined (unpainted), with exposed timber trusses. There is a fine timber ventilation frieze along the full length of the side walls of both the nave and the chancel/sanctuary, just beneath the roof. Interior walls are rendered to resemble stonework, and the floors are of concrete. Reflecting church liturgical practices of its era, the floor of the chancel is raised above that of the nave, and the floor of the sanctuary, at the far end of the chancel, is raised further. The high altar is placed here, three steps above the floor of the chancel. At the southeastern end of the chancel, projecting into the nave, is the low altar, which rests on a concrete platform raised two steps above the floor of the nave, but one step below the floor of the chancel. Both altars are constructed of local granite in a random rubble pattern. A pulpit of moulded concrete is located on the concrete platform in front of the chancel, on the southwest side. The nave has two rows of timber pews, and there are timber choir stalls in the chancel.

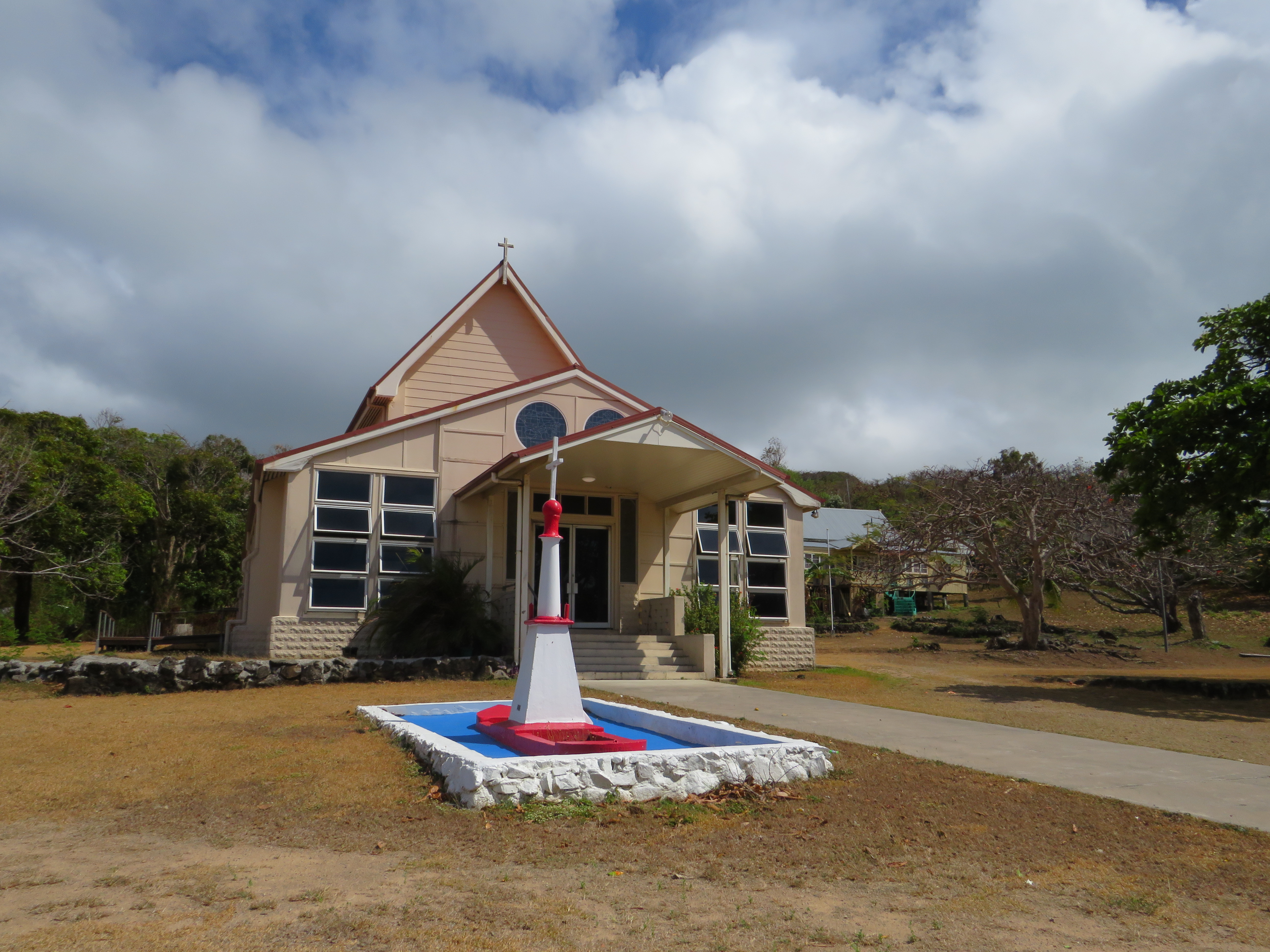
Cathedral exterior with ship cenotaph in foreground, September 2023.

The early section of the nave is separated from the aisles by lancet-shaped concrete arches with plain mouldings, which support the roof structure. At the northwest end of the northeast aisle is a small chapel, separated form the remainder of the aisle by a low timber railing, and from the nave by a carved timber screen of indigenous design.

The 1960s extension has a much lower ceiling, clad with fibrous cement sheeting. The side concrete walls are rendered, but the front wall, which is timber framed, is lined with fibrous-cement sheeting. Square concrete pillars follow the line of the arches between the earlier nave and the aisles, and support the roof of this section. The extension floor is of concrete.

The church contains many relics and memorials associated with the wreck of the Quetta in 1890, with other Torres Strait shipwrecks, and with persons closely associated with the work of the church.

Quetta "relics" include a lifebelt, washed ashore on Albany Island; and a porthole, thickly encrusted with coral growth, and the Quetta's stern riding light, both of which were salvaged from the wreck in 1906. A slab of timber on which the diocesan arms is carved and painted, the top of a small credence table, and a palm stand to the memory of Edgar Dawson, are made from Quetta timbers. In addition to the relics from the ship, many of the church furnishings are memorials given by families and friends of Quetta passengers, including a brass offeratory plate, lectern and plaques (including a memorial plaque to two young girls from the Lacy family, one of whom survived the wreck, and one of whom drowned); and a window in memory of Alexander and Louisa Archer, who drowned in the wreck. There is a framed early photograph of the Quetta, and a 1911 plaque with the inscription:

This Cathedral was erected TO THE GLORY OF GOD and in memory of those lost in the wreck of the BI SS QUETTA 3484 tons which about 9.14pm on FRIDAY 28TH FEB. 1890, struck an unchartered rock in the ADOLPHUS CHANNEL whilst outbound from Brisbane to London, and although in calm waters and bright moonlight, sank within three minutes with the loss of 133 lives out of a total of 293 on board. Presented by GRS February 1911.

In addition, there is a brass plaque with the inscription:

This memorial stone was placed here by the Hon. John Douglas CMG Gov't Resident May 24th 1893 This Church was consecrated by the Right Rev CG Barlow Bishop of North Queensland Nov 12th 1893 as a memorial of those who were lost in the SS Quetta Feb 28th 1890 and as a thanksgiving offering for those who were saved.

In the church grounds west of the sanctuary/chancel is a steel frame supporting a ship's bell with the lettering QUETTA and the date 1881. Beneath is a stone plaque on the ground, with the inscription:

This bell was rededicated on the centenary of the loss of the "RMS Quetta" 28th February 1990. Anthony, Bishop of Carpentaria

Other relics/memorials not associated with the Quetta include:

- two benches from the wreck of the Volga
- a Union Jack taken down on Green Hill Fort at the proclamation of Federation on 1 January 1901
- various memorial stained glass windows
- various memorial plaques, including those to the Hon John Douglas and Hugh Milman, both of whom served as Government Residents on Thursday Island. There is also a marble plaque in memory of over 300 persons who perished in Cyclone Mahina off Cape Melville on 5 March 1899, in which 73 vessels (mostly pearl-shell luggers) were wrecked or foundered.

Just inside the front entrance is a marble and timber font, installed in 1902, which is a memorial to two Congregational missionaries, Rev. James Chalmers and Rev. Oliver Tomkins, who were killed in British New Guinea in 1901. The stand has been refurbished.

In the front grounds of the church, just south of the main entrance, is a concrete memorial erected in 1961 to commemorate of the arrival of the Christian missionaries in 1871. The plaque on the front reads:

Thank God for the first missionaries who, on 1st July 1871 at Darnley Island brought The Light of Christ to the Torres Straits. The concrete platform on which the obelisk and cross stands is in the shape of a small boat.

There is a steel-framed bell tower, resting on a concrete platform adjoining the northeast side of the church, which is likely to date from the 1960s when the front extension was constructed. The brass bell is understood to be that obtained from Townsville c. 1903.

=== The Church Hall ===
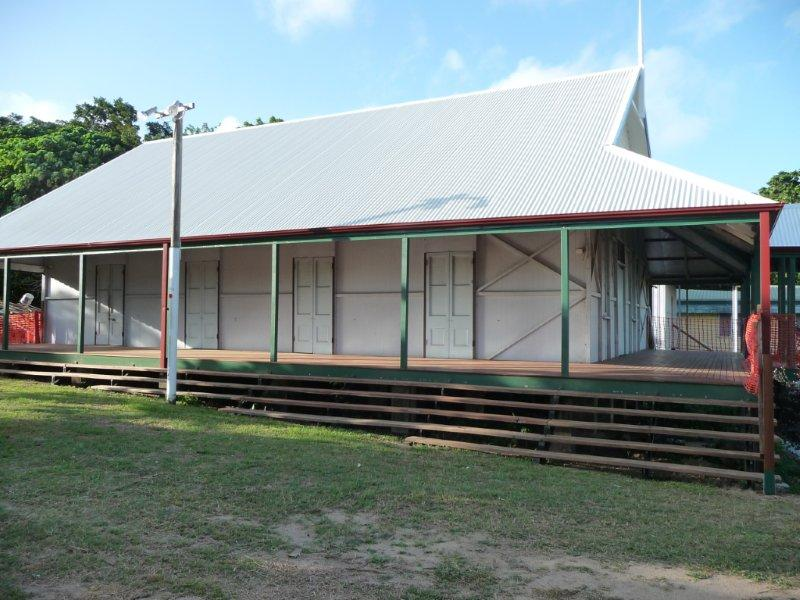
Parish Hall, Quetta Memorial Cathedral Church, Thursday Island, 2014

The Church Hall (Parish Institute) is located close to the Douglas Street frontage at the eastern end of the site. It is a substantial timber-framed building, rectangular in form, with verandahs to front and sides, resting on concrete stumps no more than 900 millimetres (35 in) high at the front, and almost at ground level at the rear. It has a high gabled roof, clad in corrugated iron, which extends in bungalow fashion over the side verandahs. The front gabled end has chamferboards and is decorated with a tall finial. The rear gabled end has weatherboards. The front verandah has a separate roof with a small centrally positioned gabled pediment. Both front and southwest verandahs have plain timber posts, but the northeast verandah is enclosed with later profiled iron sheeting and louvred windows. The front verandah has later timber rails. Access to the building is via wide timber steps to the southwest side verandah.

The southwest (side) and front walls have exposed stud framing and are lined with narrow, vertically jointed, tongue-and-groove timber. The side wall has four pairs of French doors opening onto the verandahs. The front elevation has a centrally positioned main set of double doors with fanlight above, which would have been accessed originally from centrally positioned front steps. To either side of the front door is a pair of triple-paned casement windows, with the glass painted. The rear elevation has a small skillion-roofed extension with later additions.

=== Bishop's House ===
The Bishop's House is situated on higher ground behind the church hall, to the north of the church, facing southeast toward Douglas Street. It is a timber-framed residence, high-set on concrete stumps. The core of the building has an early high-pitched gabled roof, re-clad with modern corrugated iron, and has some surviving decorative detail in the gabled ends. Early surrounding verandahs have separate roofs, also re-clad, but have been enclosed and altered on several occasions with a variety of fabric (corrugated iron, fibrous-cement sheeting, glass louvres, sliding windows, casement windows, and timber boards), making the original form of the building difficult to read. There is no discernible surviving evidence of the original timber balustrading to the verandahs. The front enclosed verandah retains a centrally positioned entrance, and early timber portico with a small gabled roof (re-clad), but most of the decorative elements to the portico have been removed, and the original timber steps have been replaced by a spiral of concrete steps with an iron railing, at the side of the porch.

Attached to the enclosed back verandah is a sequence of small additions. There are two small, early, timber-framed, gable-roofed structures which were likely originally kitchen houses, one behind the other, and accessed through each other. The kitchen house adjoining the main building is the larger. These are now clad with fibrous cement sheeting, and it is not clear whether the original timber boarding (possibly single-skin) survives. Off the second kitchen house, at the rear, is a semi-open skillion-roofed laundry area, and attached to this, a small, later, skillion-roofed drying area with fibrous cement sheeting to balustrade height.

On the southwest side of the building one perimeter stump has been removed and a steel beam inserted, to provide car accommodation beneath the house. It is likely the house was accessed from Chester Street, at the rear, but the back garden is so overgrown that any driveway has been obscured.

Internally, the building has been altered substantially, and the early layout is no longer easily read. What appears originally to have comprised the front verandah, a central corridor, and two rooms on the northeast side of the core, is now one large enclosed space, used as a living room or lounge. Opening off this at the rear, in an enclosed space which was originally the back verandah, is the dining room. Much of the former back wall of the house, between the lounge and the dining room, has been removed to open up this space. The northeast side verandah has been enclosed, possibly at an early date but with later modifications, to create three bedrooms. The southwestern side of the house was modified in the 1960s to provide a suite of rooms for the Bishop, which included a main bedroom (which possibly was originally two smaller rooms), a sitting room and an office on the enclosed side verandah, and a bathroom on the rear enclosed verandah. The office has a private entrance from the southwest garden. There is also a small bedroom in the enclosed corner of the front verandah on this side of the house. This side verandah was also enclosed at an early period, but with a number of alterations since.

The first of the attached gable-roofed structures at the rear of the building is located off the dining room, and contains one large kitchen space and a toilet and external door at the southwest end. The smaller gable-roofed attached building beyond the kitchen contains a bathroom and a scullery, from which a door opens to the covered laundry and drying-area.

Most of the internal walls and ceilings in the house are lined with fibrous cement sheeting. However, the ceilings of what were formerly the northeast side and rear verandahs retain their original early timber lining in the form of wide, tongue-and-groove boards with a central double beading. Floors throughout appear to be early, with evidence of weathering on the underneath of the former verandah floorboards.

The house is situated within a very overgrown garden. The front garden has a curving concrete path lined with stone-edged garden beds, which serpentines from the front edge of the block to the front door. On most sides of the house there are concrete paths, some based on rubble rock foundations, and garden beds. To the northeast of the building is the former Bishop's Chapel, a small, high-set building with corrugated iron walls and roof. The date of construction has not been identified.

=== The Rectory ===
This is a high-set, timber-framed building which has been clad with fibrous cement sheeting and a Colorbond roof. The earlier form appears to have been a small bungalow with a front verandah, but this has been enclosed.

== Heritage listing ==
Quetta Memorial Precinct was listed on the Queensland Heritage Register on 27 July 2001 having satisfied the following criteria.

The place is important in demonstrating the evolution or pattern of Queensland's history.

The Quetta Memorial Precinct, Thursday Island, is important in illustrating the pattern of Queensland history. As one of the earliest church precincts established in the Torres Strait, it provides evidence of the introduction of Christianity in the region, of the impact this has had on the lives of the people of the Torres Strait, and of the development of the town of Port Kennedy (later Thursday Island) as the bureaucratic and commercial centre of the region. As a memorial to the lives lost and saved in the wreck of the Quetta in 1890, the cathedral in particular is illustrative of the nature of early non-indigenous settlement in northern Queensland, and the particular hazards of shipping at a period prior to the development of a comprehensive system of navigational aids along the Queensland coast. As the See House for the Diocese of Carpentaria for approximately 96 years, the Bishop's House has strong historical significance. It is important for its early association with the Bishop's College, the first far northern Anglican theological college, which was accommodated in the Bishop's House from 1901 to 1907.

The place demonstrates rare, uncommon or endangered aspects of Queensland's cultural heritage.

The cathedral, with its relics and memorials to those lost in the Quetta and other Torres Strait shipwrecks, provides a unique historical record of these events. It is the only known memorial church in Queensland associated with maritime disasters.

The place is important in demonstrating the principal characteristics of a particular class of cultural places.

The Anglican Cathedral Precinct on Thursday Island remains a substantially intact church complex, with Bishop's House (1891), Cathedral (1893–1964), Parish Institute (1902–03) and Rectory (1904) extant within the original extent of the church grounds, and is important in illustrating the principal characteristics of its type. The cathedral and church hall (Parish Institute) remain particularly fine examples of their type. The cathedral is an excellent illustration of the imposition in an exotic location of the late 19th-century colonial fashion for erecting Gothic Revival style church buildings, but adapted to local conditions (including climate, lack of local raw resources, the cost of importing materials, and the fledgling nature of the local parish) – as illustrated by the use of concrete rather than stone or brick, the provision of timber ventilation friezes along the top of the side walls of both nave and sanctuary/chancel, the modification of the architect's original design to include doors along the length of the aisles, and the construction in stages. The interior of the cathedral is highly intact, and contains many memorials. The late 19th/early 20th-century sections of the cathedral are important in illustrating the range of the ecclesiastical work of architect John Hingeston Buckeridge, who was the Brisbane Anglican Diocesan architect from 1887 to 1902.

The place is important because of its aesthetic significance.

The Quetta Memorial Precinct is an integral historical and aesthetic element of the Thursday Island townscape, and makes a significant contribution to the streetscape of Douglas Street. The cathedral and church hall make the strongest visual impact in the street. The interior of the cathedral produces a strong aesthetic experience, engendered by the high spaces, the arcaded aisles, the fine timber ceiling and exposed roof trusses, the stained glass memorial windows, the dark-stained timber pews and other church furnishings, and the number and variety of memorials.

The place has a strong or special association with a particular community or cultural group for social, cultural or spiritual reasons.

The cathedral, church hall and Bishop's House are of social, cultural and spiritual importance to the people of the Torres Strait, and particularly to the Anglican community, for its association with the expansion of Christianity in the region. The cathedral has been, and still is, a focus for worship for generations of Thursday Islanders, and is considered the "mother church" and focus for Anglican religious activity in the Torres Strait. The cathedral contains many relics and memorials associated with shipwrecks and with the sea, not just with the Quetta, and is intimately associated with Torres Strait culture and its identification with the sea. Many Torres Strait Islanders consider the Anglican precinct to be a sacred place, in the same sense as the original Kaurareg people would have regarded places as "sacred". The cathedral has a special association also with the people of Queensland, as a memorial to those who lost their lives in the Quetta shipwreck of 28 February 1890, one of Queensland's (and Australia's) worst maritime disasters. From its inception, the Quetta Memorial has functioned as a place of pilgrimage and as a tourist attraction, has been visited by many prominent people, and is well known in Queensland. The cathedral has acquired a mystique engendered by its dramatic origins, its memorial status, its longevity, and its tropical location. The Church Hall has been the focus of social and cultural activities on Thursday Island for close to a century, and the Bishop's House, which accommodated successive Bishops of the Diocese of Carpentaria from 1900 to 1996, is regarded by Thursday Islanders as a holy place.

The place has a special association with the life or work of a particular person, group or organisation of importance in Queensland's history.

The precinct has a special association with the missionary work of the Church of England in Queensland (and in Australia). Constructed initially by non-indigenous interests as a memorial to white colonialism, the Quetta Memorial was quickly transformed into the hub and focus of Christian life within the Torres Strait, and fostered the spread of Christianity through the islands. The life-histories of generations of Islanders are encompassed within this church, and the first indigenous Torres Strait Islander Anglican ministers were ordained here. The place is illustrative of the leadership role played by the Church in the Torres Strait.
