= John H. Matthews =

Canadian politician

John Henry Matthews IV (August 11, 1888 – July 7, 1956) was the Mayor of Brantford, Ontario, Canada from 1946 to 1947.

Known as Jack to his family and friends, he came to Canada in 1909 from the island of Guernsey, he married Florence Honora Jeune in 1910 and they had ten children. He was a lithographer/stereotyper with the Brantford Expositor. He served as a city alderman for several years and two years (1946-1947) as mayor. He was involved in the formation of the Co-operative Commonwealth Federation that became the New Democratic Party in 1961. He ran for election as a CCF candidate but lost his deposit.
