= John Matthews (died 1798) =

John Matthews (who died in 1798) was an English sailor and writer active in the late eighteenth century. Despite being commissioned as a lieutenant in the Royal Navy on 1 March 1783, he failed to find a position in the navy. He gained employment with Samuel Hartley and Company, a London based business involved in the Atlantic slave trade. Two of Matthews' journals of his life in Sierra Leone were acquired by Firestone Library, Princeton University in 2017. They were previously unknown to scholars.

== Auction of papers ==
In 2017 the Firestone Library, Princeton University acquired a number of papers originating with John Matthews which had previously been unknown to the scholarly community. These included two journals concerning the period Matthews spent in and around Sierra Leone between 1785 and 1787.

== See also ==
- A Voyage to the River Sierra-Leone
