= Anglican Diocese of Carpentaria =

Anglican diocese in northern Australia

Diocese of Carpentaria
- Coat of arms

Location
- Country: Australia
- Territory: Far North Queensland; Northern Territory (to 1968)
- Ecclesiastical province: Queensland
- Metropolitan: Archbishop of Brisbane
- Coordinates: 10°35′1.7″S 142°12′53.6″E

Information
- Denomination: Anglicanism
- Established: 1900
- Dissolved: 1996
- Cathedral: All Souls and St Bartholomew's Cathedral Church, Thursday Island
- Parent church: Anglican Church of Australia

The Anglican Diocese of Carpentaria was an Anglican diocese in northern Australia from 1900 to 1996. It included most of northern Queensland, the islands of the Torres Strait and, until 1968, all of the Northern Territory. The see was based at Quetta Cathedral on Thursday Island in the Torres Strait.

The creation of the diocese was the work of Christopher Barlow, Bishop of North Queensland. The diocese's first bishop was Gilbert White and the last was Anthony Hall-Matthews.

In 1968 a new diocese, the Diocese of the Northern Territory based in Darwin, was created out of the Diocese of Carpentaria and, in 1996, the remaining part of the Carpentaria diocese merged back into the Diocese of North Queensland. As part of the merger negotiations, an assistant bishop within that diocese was elected to oversee the Torres Strait Region. However, unrest persisted and the islanders campaigned for an independent Torres Strait diocese.

In 1997, some Anglicans in the Torres Strait region of the former diocese were received into the Traditional Anglican Communion (a Continuing Anglican body) and formed themselves into the Church of Torres Strait. In 2010 they petitioned the Vatican for reception as a personal ordinariate in the Catholic Church. In April 2014, this petition (slightly modified, as the original petition was for a separate jurisdiction) was granted by Pope Francis. According to the agreement, the Church of Torres Strait was to become a territory under the jurisdiction of the Personal Ordinariate of Our Lady of the Southern Cross, but day-to-day authority would remain devolved to a regional vicar. However, with the exception of the parish on Dauan Island (which joined the ordinariate), the Church of Torres Strait subsequently joined the Brazilian Catholic Apostolic Church instead.

== Bishops of Carpentaria ==
- 1900–1915: Gilbert White (translated to Willochra, 1915)
- 1915–1922: Henry Newton (translated to New Guinea, 1922)
- 1922–1949: Stephen Davies
- 1950–1960: John Hudson (afterwards Bishop Coadjutor of Brisbane, 1960)
- 1960–1968: John Matthews
- 1968–1974: Eric Hawkey
- 1974–1984: Hamish Jamieson (translated to Bunbury, 1984)
- 1984–1996: Tony Hall-Matthews

== Assistant bishops ==
Kiwami Dai was the first Torres Strait Islander to become a bishop. On 1 July 1986, he was consecrated at All Souls' and St Bartholomew's Cathedral, Thursday Island, and served as an assistant bishop of Carpentaria diocese.
