= List of Anglican bishops who converted to Catholicism =

This is a list of notable Anglican bishops who converted to the Catholic Church.

A broad definition of 'Anglican' is employed here, including churches within the Anglican Communion, but also those of the Continuing Anglican movement which formed following controversy over various actual or proposed theological and doctrinal reforms, such as the ordination of women. These reforms have reportedly spurred on individual bishops to leave their own churches to join the Catholic Church. During a year-long period across 2021 and 2022, four Church of England bishops converted to Catholicism; all four no longer presided over a see at the times of their conversions.

Name	Date of conversion	Previous church(es)	Notes
John Clement Gordon	1702 (circa)	Church of Scotland	Bishop of Galloway, 1688–1689
Levi Silliman Ives	1852	Episcopal Church	Bishop of North Carolina, 1831–1852
Frederick Joseph Kinsman	1919	Episcopal Church	Bishop of Delaware, 1908–1919
Peter Francis Watterson	1984	Continuing Anglican movement	
Graham Douglas Leonard	1994	Church of England	Bishop of Willesden, 1964–1973 Bishop of Truro, 1973–1981; Bishop of London, 1981–1991
Conrad John Eustace Meyer	1994	Church of England	Bishop of Dorchester, 1979–1988
Cecil Richard Rutt	1994	Church of England	Bishop of Daejeon, 1968–1974 Bishop of St Germans, 1974–1979; Bishop of Leicester, 1979–1990
Clarence Cullam Pope	1995	Episcopal Church	Bishop of Fort Worth, 1986–1995
Charles John Klyberg	1996	Church of England	Bishop of Fulham, 1985–1996
John Bailey Lipscomb	2007	Episcopal Church	Bishop of Southwest Florida, 1997–2007
Jeffrey Neil Steenson	2007	Episcopal Church	Bishop of Rio Grande, 2004–2007
Paul Richardson	2009	Church of England Anglican Church of Papua New Guinea; Anglican Church of Australia	Bishop of Aipo Rongo, 1987–1995 Bishop of Wangaratta, 1995–1997; Assistant Bishop of Newcastle, 1998–2009
Ross Owen Davies	2010	Anglican Church of Australia	Bishop of The Murray, 2002–2010
Andrew Burnham	2011	Church of England	Bishop of Ebbsfleet, 2000–2010
Edwin Barnes	2011	Church of England	Bishop of Richborough, 1995–2002
John Charles Broadhurst	2011	Church of England	Bishop of Fulham,1996–2010
Keith Newton	2011	Church of England	Bishop of Richborough, 2002–2010
Robert David Silk	2011	Church of England Anglican Church of Australia	Bishop of Ballarat, 1994–2003
Robert William Stanley Mercer	2012	Church of the Province of Central Africa Anglican Catholic Church of Canada	Bishop of Matabeleland, 1977–1987 Metropolitan Bishop of Canada, 1988–2005
Carl Leonard Reid	2012	Anglican Catholic Church of Canada	
Peter Donald Wilkinson	2012	Anglican Church of Canada Anglican Catholic Church of Canada	
Harry Entwistle	2012	Church of England Anglican Church of Australia; Anglican Catholic Church in Australia	
Mark Stephen Camp	2013	Anglican Province of Christ the Good Shepherd	Archbishop of the Archdiocese of Christ the King, 2005–2013
David Lloyd Moyer	2014	Episcopal Church Anglican Church in America	
Raphael Kajiwara	2015	Anglican Church in Japan Traditional Anglican Communion	Bishop of Yokohama, 1984–2001
Jose Manuel Delgado	2018	United Anglican Church	Bishop of Puerto Rico & Caribbean, 2002–2018
Gavin Roy Pelham Ashenden	2019	Church of England Christian Episcopal Church	Missionary bishop to the United Kingdom and Europe, 2017–2019
Jonathan Michael Goodall	2021	Church of England	Bishop of Ebbsfleet, 2013–2021
Michael James Nazir-Ali	2021	Church of England Church of Pakistan	Bishop of Rochester, 1994–2009 Bishop of Raiwind, 1984–1986
John William Goddard	2021	Church of England	Bishop of Burnley, 2000–2014
Peter Robert Forster	2021	Church of England	Bishop of Chester, 2001–2019
John Hepworth	2021	Anglican Church of Australia; Anglican Catholic Church in Australia	Primate of the Traditional Anglican Communion, 2002–2012; He was a Catholic priest before leaving Catholicism for Anglicanism
Richard Pain	2023	Church in Wales	Bishop of Monmouth, 2013–2019
John Ford	2025	Church of England Anglican Church of Australia	Bishop of Plymouth, 2005–2013 Bishop of The Murray, 2013–2019
