= Keith Dalby =

Australian bishop (born 1961/2)

The Right Reverend Keith Dalby
- Bishop of The Murray
- Church: Anglican Church of Australia
- Diocese: The Murray
- Predecessor: John Ford

Orders
- Consecration: 16 August 2019 by Geoffrey Smith

Personal details
- Born: 1961 or 1962 (age 64–65)
- Denomination: Anglican
- Spouse: Alison Dutton
- Children: 5
- Education: St Barnabas College, Adelaide (BTh); Moore Theological College (MA)

Keith William Dalby is an Australian Anglican bishop who has been Bishop of The Murray since 2019 but stepped aside in December 2023.

== Early life ==
Dalby was born in the United Kingdom, but returned to South Australia where his parents had married. He spent time in the Northern Territory before joining the Australian Navy where he served for 13 years, 12 as a submariner.

== Ordained ministry ==
Dalby commenced training for the priesthood at St Barnabas College, Adelaide, in 1992 and obtained a Bachelor of Theology degree. He became curate at St Michael's Mitcham in Adelaide before being a parish priest in Timboon and Warracknabeal in Victoria in the Diocese of Ballarat from 1997 and Gordon in the Diocese of Sydney from 2004.

=== Episcopal ministry ===
In June 2019, Dalby was announced as the fifth diocesan bishop of the Diocese of The Murray in South Australia. He was consecrated as bishop at St Peter's Cathedral, Adelaide, on 16 August 2019 and enthroned as Bishop of The Murray on 17 August 2019 at St John the Baptist Cathedral, Murray Bridge.

Dalby stepped aside as Bishop of The Murray effective 9 December 2023. It was later revealed that he had secretly married newly ordained priest Alison Dutton in August 2023, and that a controversy had since arisen in the diocese in relation to the marriage. A spokesperson for the diocesan council said that the diocese, in line with the procedures and protocols of the Anglican Church of Australia, was working through the controversy, in a manner sensitive to Dalby and Dutton. As of May 2025, Dalby was still being reported as having stepped aside.

==== Ordination of women ====
In 2022, Dalby followed through with a decade-old commitment by a previous synod to allow a discussion on the ordination of women as priests. During 2022 and 2023 consultations and workshops were held with clergy and lay people and Dalby sought advice from Stephen Pickard, former assistant Bishop in Adelaide and the canon theologian of the diocese. Dalby mentioned the mentorship of Bishop David McCall and circulated discussion papers written by Kevin Giles. He allowed a canon to be put to the next synod in 2023 which enabled the ordination of women as priests. The vote was 57–4 in favour with no debate. On 12 August 2023, Dalby ordained three women and one man to the priesthood, Margaret Holt, Carol Cornwall, Alison Dutton and Rodney Fopp.

Anglican Communion titles
Preceded by John Ford	Bishop of The Murray; 2019–2023	Succeeded by Vacant
