= Frederick Matthews =

The Ven Frederick Albert John Matthews MA(Oxon)
- Archdeacon of Plymouth
- Diocese: Diocese of Exeter
- In office: 1962–1978
- Predecessor: Norman Harry Clarke
- Successor: Kenneth Albert Newing
- Other post: Rural Dean of Aylesbeare (1957–1961)

Orders
- Ordination: 1936 (deacon); 1937(priest)

Personal details
- Born: 4 January 1913
- Died: 14 May 1985 (aged 72)
- Denomination: Anglican
- Residence: Plympton, Plymouth
- Parents: Albert & Elizabeth
- Occupation: priest
- Education: Devonport High School for Boys, Exeter College, Oxford

Frederick Albert John Matthews (4 January 1913 – 14 May 1985) was the Archdeacon of Plymouth from 1962 to 1978.

Matthews was educated at Devonport High School for Boys, Exeter College, Oxford and Wycliffe Hall, Oxford After a curacy at Stoke Damerel he was Vicar of Pinhoe from 1944 to 1961; and Rural Dean of Aylesbeare from 1957 to 1961. He was Vicar of Plympton St Mary from 1961 to 1983; and a Prebendary of Exeter Cathedral from 1978 until his death.

Church of England titles
Preceded by Norman Harry Clarke	Archdeacon of Plymouth; 1962–1978	Succeeded by Kenneth Albert Newing
