= Robin Ellis (priest) =

Robin Gareth Ellis (born 8 December 1935) was the Archdeacon of Plymouth from 1982 to 2000.

Ellis was educated at Worksop College, Pembroke College, Oxford and Chichester Theological College After a curacy in Swinton he was Chaplain at his old school. He was Vicar of Swaffham Prior from, 1966 to 1974; of Wisbech from 1974 to 1982; and Vicar of Yelverton from 1982 to 1986.

Church of England titles
| Preceded by Kenneth Albert Newing | Archdeacon of Plymouth; 1982–2000 | Succeeded by Tony Wilds |
