= Anglican Diocese of The Murray =

Diocese of the Anglican Church of Australia

Coordinates: 35°07′11.62″S 139°16′18.31″E

Diocese of The Murray
- Coat of arms

Location
- Country: Australia
- Territory: Adelaide Hills; Fleurieu Peninsula; Murraylands; Riverland; Southern Adelaide
- Ecclesiastical province: South Australia
- Metropolitan: Archbishop of Adelaide
- Archdeaconries: The Murray; Fleurieu Peninsula
- Headquarters: 4 Clara Street; Murray Bridge, SA

Information
- Denomination: Anglican
- Rite: Book of Common Prayer; An Australian Prayer Book; A Prayer Book for Australia
- Established: 1970
- Cathedral: St John the Baptist Cathedral, Murray Bridge
- Language: English

Current leadership
- Parent church: Anglican Church of Australia
- Bishop: Keith Dalby; Bishop of The Murray; (not currently serving - stepped aside in December 2023)
- Metropolitan Archbishop: Geoffrey Smith; (since 2017)

Website
- Diocese of The Murray
- Anglican Diocese of The Murray
- Logo of the Diocese

The Anglican Diocese of The Murray is located in the south-eastern region of South Australia. Founded in 1970 as part of the Province of South Australia, it takes in the Fleurieu Peninsula, Riverland, Adelaide Hills, Murraylands and the southern suburbs of Adelaide. In 2011 the diocese had 22 parishes or pastoral districts. The cathedral church of the diocese is the Cathedral of St John the Baptist, Murray Bridge. The most recent bishop is Keith Dalby, who has served from June 2019 but stepped aside in December 2023.

== Structure and churchmanship ==
In 2011 the diocese had 22 parishes or pastoral districts. The cathedral church of the diocese is the Cathedral of St John the Baptist, Murray Bridge.

The Diocese of The Murray is a traditionalist Anglo-Catholic diocese which formerly did not ordain women to the priesthood. It was the last diocese in the Anglican Church of Australia to admit women to the diaconate, ordaining Margaret Holt as deacon in April 2017. In June 2023 its synod voted to allow the ordination of women as priests.

Ross Davies relinquished the position of bishop in September 2010 and was received into the Roman Catholic Church. John Ford, the Bishop suffragan of Plymouth in the Church of England's Diocese of Exeter, was installed as the new bishop on 6 December 2013. He retired in May 2019 and Keith Dalby was elected as his successor. Dalby and synod members worked towards the decision to allow the ordination of women as priests.

On 12 August 2023 three women deacons, along with Rodney Fopp, were ordained by Dalby to the priesthood at Christ the King Anglican Church, Mt Barker. Carol Cornwall became assistant curate of Southern Suburbs, Margaret Holt assistant curate of Strathalbyn and Alison Dutton assistant curate of The South Coast.

== See also ==
- Ordination of women in the Anglican Communion
- List of the first women ordained as priests in the Anglican Church of Australia in 1992
