= Ernest Newman (priest) =

Ernest Frederick Newman (2 March 1859 – 28 April 1928) was Archdeacon of Plymouth from 1921 to 1928.

He was educated at Marlborough and Keble College, Oxford and ordained in 1885. After a curacy at Reading Minster he became a Chaplain to the Forces serving at the Tower of London and in Bengal, Caterham, South Africa (where he was Mentioned in despatches) and Portsmouth until his Archdeacon’s appointment.

== Notes ==
Church of England titles
Preceded by Arthur William Thomson Perowne	Archdeacon of Plymouth; 1921–1928	Succeeded by Francis Whitfield Daukes
