= Bishop of Plymouth =

Bishop of Plymouth may refer to:

- The Anglican Bishop of Plymouth (a suffragan bishop in the Diocese of Exeter)
- The Roman Catholic Bishop of Plymouth (the ordinary of the Roman Catholic Diocese of Plymouth)
