= Tony Wilds =

Tony Wilds may refer to:

- Tony Wilds (priest), archdeacon of Plymouth
- Tony Wilds (umpire), Australian cricket umpire
