= Province of South Australia =

Province of South Australia may refer to:

- Anglican Province of South Australia
- British Province of South Australia
