= Ross Davies (bishop) =

Australian former Anglican bishop

- Bishop of The Murray
- Church: Anglican Church of Australia (to 2010); Roman Catholic Church (since 2010)
- Province: South Australia
- Diocese: The Murray
- In office: 2002–2010
- Predecessor: Graham Walden
- Successor: John Ford

Orders
- Ordination: 1981 (deacon); 1982 (priest)
- Laicized: 13 December 2010

Personal details
- Born: Ross Owen Davies; 4 February 1955 (age 71)
- Denomination: Roman Catholicism (formerly Anglicanism)

Ross Owen Davies (born 4 February 1955) is an Australian former Anglican bishop. He was the bishop of the Diocese of The Murray in the Anglican Church of Australia from 2002 to 2010.

Davies was educated at the University of Melbourne (BA 1977, LLB 1979) and St Barnabas College, Adelaide (Australian College of Theology, ThL 1981). He served in parishes in Australia until 1991, the last of which was as rector of St Paul's, Camperdown. He was then priest-in-charge of Mundford, Ickburgh and Cranwich (1991–94) and then curate of Somerton with Compton Dundon (1994–97). He then returned to Australia, where he was rector of Hindmarsh, South Australia (1997-2000), before becoming Archdeacon of The Murray (2000–02).

In 2002 he was appointed the bishop of the Diocese of The Murray in the Anglican Church of Australia. In September 2010, he resigned and was found guilty by a church tribunal of "disgraceful conduct and wilful violation of church ordinances". He was subsequently removed from holy orders on 13 December 2010, only the second bishop to be so removed.

Davies had belonged to the traditionalist Anglo-Catholic wing of Anglicanism. On 27 September 2010, three days after resigning as the Bishop of The Murray, he was received into the Roman Catholic Church as a layman by Philip Wilson, the Roman Catholic Archbishop of Adelaide.

Anglican Communion titles
Preceded by Graham Walden	Bishop of The Murrary; 2002–2010	Succeeded by John Ford
