= Brad Billings =

Australian Anglican bishop

The Most Reverend Brad Billings
- Archbishop of Adelaide
- Church: Anglican Church of Australia
- Province: South Australia
- Diocese: Adelaide
- Installed: 7 March 2026
- Predecessor: Geoffrey Smith
- Previous posts: Assistant Bishop for Oodthenong Area, Diocese of Melbourne

Orders
- Ordination: 2001 (priesthood)
- Consecration: 30 April 2016 by Philip Freier

Personal details
- Denomination: Anglican
- Spouse: Karen
- Children: 5
- Education: Ridley College (undergraduate theology); University of Melbourne (MA); Australian University of Theology (Th.D.)

Bradly Scott Billings is an Australian Anglican bishop. Since 2026, he has been archbishop of Adelaide and was previously assistant bishop in the Anglican Diocese of Melbourne (2016-2026).

== Biography ==
Billings holds degrees in theology and ministry from Ridley College, a Master of Arts in Classics & Archaeology (on ancient Ephesus) from the University of Melbourne and a doctorate in theology from the Australian College of Theology on the Gospel of Luke.

After being ordained, he worked in parishes for approximately 15 years in the Diocese of Melbourne, including serving as vicar at Toorak, and was Archdeacon of Stonnington and Glen Eira for five years. In April 2016, he was consecrated and appointed as assistant bishop for the Monomeeth episcopate, which includes responsibility for theological education and clergy wellbeing across the Diocese of Melbourne. In 2023, Billings swapped roles with fellow assistant bishop Kate Prowd and took on the oversight of the Oodthenong episcopal area, which included parishes in the northern and western parts of the diocese

In December 2025, Billings was elected to succeed Geoffrey Smith as archbishop of Adelaide. He was installed on 7 March 2026 at St Peter's Cathedral.

Anglican Communion titles
Preceded by Geoffrey Smith	Archbishop of Adelaide; Since 2026	Incumbent
