= Francis Marshall (physiologist) =

British physiologist (1878–1949

Francis Hugh Adam Marshall CBE FRS FRSE LLD (11 July 1878 – 5 February 1949) was a British physiologist who did pioneering early research into the physiology and endocrinology of biological reproduction.

== Early life and education ==
Marshall was born in High Wycombe, Buckinghamshire, the son of Thomas Marshall and Mary née Lucas. He was educated at St Mark's School in Windsor then Southborough School in Tunbridge Wells. He studied at University College, London, and then at the University of Cambridge, graduating from Christ's College in 1900. He did further postgraduate studies at the University of Edinburgh, gaining his first doctorate (DSc).

== Career and research ==
Marshall's first position was a research assistant to James Cossar Ewart in Edinburgh, assisting Ewart's work on the now-discredited theory of telegony. He also began his research on reproduction, studying the reproductive cycle of sheep at Ewart's Penicuik farm; this work resulted in his first significant research paper in 1903. He subsequently studied the oestrus cycle of ferrets (with Edward Schäfer) and dogs (with William A. Jolly). Marshall began to study the function of the ovary, publishing a classic paper with Jolly subtitled "The ovary as an organ of internal secretion" in 1905 that Alan S. Parkes described as "the first serious attempt to correlate the changes in the uterus during the reproductive cycle with the cyclic production of different internal secretions by the ovary."

From 1903 to 1908, Marshall lectured at the University of Edinburgh in Natural History. His presence at the university is cited as one of the reasons that the Institute of Animal Genetics was established there in the 1910s.

In 1908, Marshall returned to the University of Cambridge, lecturing in the School of Agriculture, and becoming a Reader in 1919. He was a fellow of Christ's College from 1909 until his death.

His studies of reproduction were interrupted by the First World War, during which he did research for the Ministries of Food and Agriculture, for example on the optimal age to slaughter cattle. His subsequent research focused on the effect of external factors such as light and climate on reproduction. He also researched courtship and reproduction in birds.

== Awards and honours ==
In 1901 Marshall was elected a Fellow of the Royal Society of Edinburgh; his proposers were James Cossar Ewart, Arthur Masterman, Robert Wallace and Cargill Gilston Knott. He was elected a Fellow of the Royal Society in 1920. Marshall was appointed a CBE in 1933, the Croonian Lecture in 1936 and, in 1940, the Royal Medal by the Royal Society.

The University of Edinburgh gave him an honorary Doctor of Laws degree (LLD) in 1939.

== Personal life ==
He never married and had no children. He retired in 1943 and died of appendicitis in Cambridge on 5 February 1949.

== Selected publications ==
- The Physiology of Reproduction, with William Cramer and James Lochhead, London: Longmans, Green and Co., 1910; 2nd ed., with William Cramer, James Lochhead and Cresswell Shearer, 1922; 3rd edn, with Alan S. Parkes, 1952; 4th edn, with Alan S. Parkes and George Eric Lamming, titled Marshall's Physiology of reproduction, 4 vols, Edinburgh: Churchill Livingstone, 1984.
- The Physiology of Farm Animals (1920)
- An Introduction to Sexual Physiology for Biological, Medical and Agricultural Students, London: Longmans, Green, and Co., 1925.
