= John Masterman =

John Masterman may refer to:

- John Cecil Masterman (1891–1977), British academic, sportsman and author; chairman of the Twenty Committee during World War II
- John Howard Bertram Masterman (1867–1923), inaugural Anglican Bishop of Plymouth
- John Masterman (MP) (1781–1862), Conservative Member of Parliament (MP) for the City of London 1841–1857
