= Daukes =

Daukes is a surname. Notable people with the surname include:

- Samuel Daukes (1811–1880), English architect
- Whitfield Daukes (1877–1954), British bishop
