= Anglican Bishop of The Murray =

Bishop of The Murray
- Bishopric

anglican
- Coat of arms of the Diocese
- Incumbent: Keith Dalby; (not currently serving - stepped aside in December 2023); since 9 December 2023
- Style: The Right Reverend

Location
- Country: Australia
- Ecclesiastical province: South Australia

Information
- First holder: Robert Porter
- Denomination: Anglicanism
- Established: 16 April 1970
- Diocese: The Murray
- Cathedral: St John the Baptist Cathedral, Murray Bridge

Website
- Diocese of The Murray

The Bishop of The Murray is the diocesan bishop of the Anglican Diocese of The Murray, Australia.

== List of Bishops of The Murray ==
Bishops of The Murray
No	From	Until	Incumbent	Notes
1	1970	1989	Robert Porter OBE	Previously Archdeacon of Ballarat.
2	1989	2001	Graham Walden OBE	Previously Assistant Bishop of Ballarat.
3	2001	2010	Ross Davies	Resigned and was received into the Roman Catholic Church as a layman; later removed from holy orders
	2010	2013	vacant	
4	2013	2019	John Ford	Previously Bishop of Plymouth in the Diocese of Exeter, and assistant bishop in the Diocese of Truro, England.
5	2019	2023	Keith Dalby	Consecrated 16 August 2019; installed 17 August 2019. Stepped aside on 9 December 2023 and not currently serving.
