= Bishop of Adelaide =

The Bishop of Adelaide may refer to:

- Anglican Bishop of Adelaide, precursor title of the Anglican Archbishop of Adelaide
- Roman Catholic Bishop of Adelaide, precursor title of the Roman Catholic Archbishop of Adelaide
