= Chichester Theological College =

Coordinates: 50.8365°N 0.7857°W

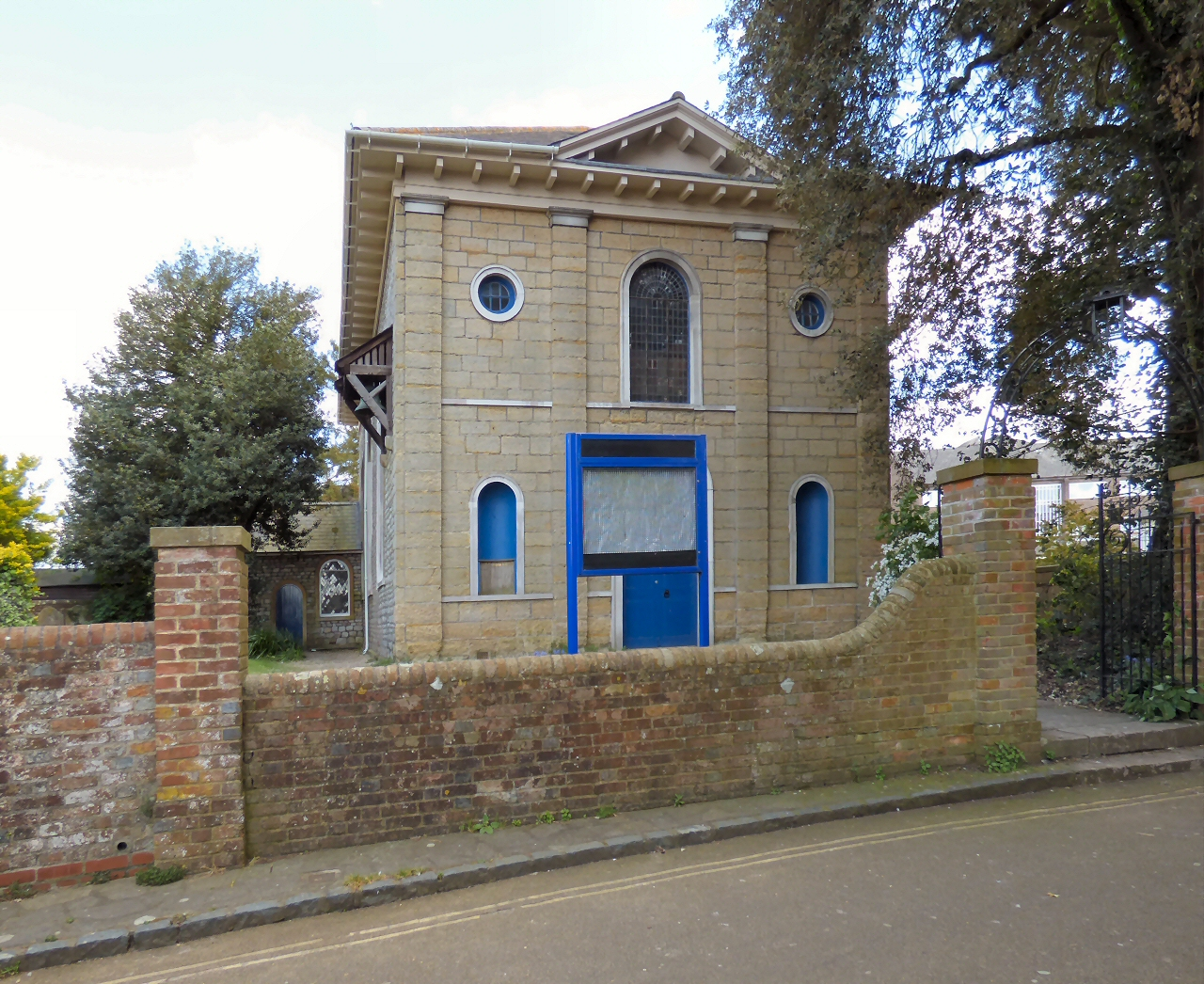
- St Bartholomew's Church, former college chapel

- Street Map of Chichester
- OS grid reference: SU 85606 04812
- Location: Chichester
- Country: England
- Denomination: Anglican
- Churchmanship: High Anglican

History
- Status: Closed
- Founded: July 1838
- Founder: William Otter
- Dedication: St Richard of Chichester
- Dedicated: 1 May 1919

Architecture
- Heritage designation: Grade II Listed
- Designated: 31 Jan 1996
- Architect(s): Ahrends, Burton & Koralek
- Architectural type: Brick Brutalism
- Completed: 1963-65
- Closed: 1994

Administration
- Province: Canterbury
- Diocese: Chichester
- Archdeaconry: Chichester
- Parish: St Paul's, Chichester

Chichester Theological College (1838–1994) was an Anglican theological college for the Diocese of Chichester in Sussex, England. Its churchmanship was high church and Anglo-Catholic.

== History ==
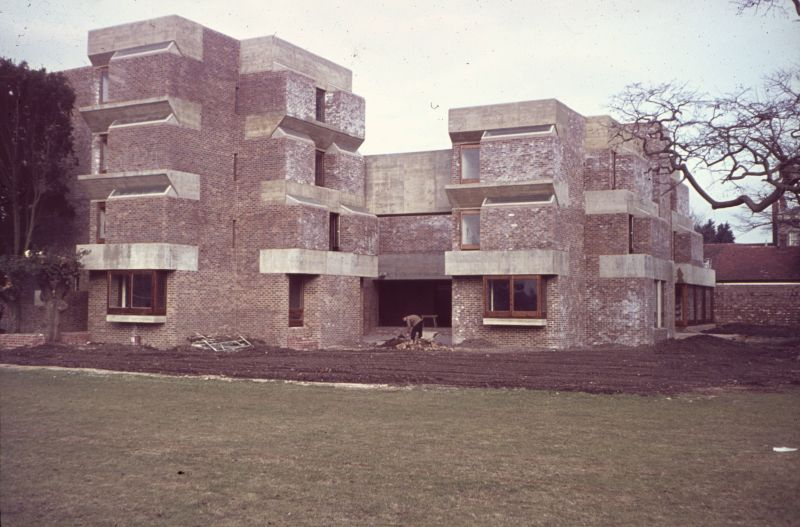
Gillett House, former college residence

Chichester Theological College was founded by William Otter in July 1838, marking it the first diocesan theological college in England. Charles Marriott of Oriel College, Oxford, served as the inaugural principal. The first donation of £50 for the college was from W. E. Gladstone.

From 1886, during Josiah Sanders Teulon's time as principal, the college experienced a gradual decline in students. This was exacerbated in 1899 when he resigned but retained his income as a resident canon. At a meeting of the college council, it was resolved to close the college. However, a persuasive argument by the vice-principal led to the appointment of Herbert Rickard as the new principal.

In 1903, a hostel in West Street, Chichester, was bought for £1000 by the college council, the balance being paid by the principal in memory of his wife. This was refitted and became the college headquarters. This hostel was sold in 1919, and the proceeds went towards the purchase of new headquarters in Westgate, Chichester, for £3500. On 1 May 1919, the college was formally reopened by Bishop Charles Ridgeway (his last episcopal act), who dedicated it to St Richard of Chichester.

During the Second World War, the college was forced to move temporarily to Cambridge while its buildings in Chichester were used by the military authorities. After the war, the college buildings were sold, except for Marriott House, which was used to house the reopened college from 21 October 1946. New residential accommodation, named Gillett House, designed by Ahrends, Burton and Koralek, later became a Listed building.

== Closure ==
After the closure of Chichester Theological College in 1994, its theological library was transferred to the University of Chichester. In addition, St Bartholomew's Chapel, once the college's chapel, is now the chaplaincy building of Chichester College.

St Bartholomew's Church, after being vacant since 2015 when the 10-year lease to Chichester College as a performance space ended, was sold to a local family partnership as an arts and community hire venue called the Chichester City Arts Centre. The centre is also the home of the Rosemary Bell Academy of Dance, a local 10-year-old school for teaching classical ballet to the Royal Academy of Dance (RAD) syllabus to children of pre-school and school age, as well as adult students. The centre opened in September 2022.

== List of principals ==
- 1838: Charles Marriott, supporter of the Oxford Movement
- 1842: Henry Browne, English classical and biblical scholar
- 1846: Philip Freeman, scholar and Archdeacon of Exeter
- 1854: Charles Anthony Swainson
- 1870: Arthur Rawson Ashwell, writer, preacher, teacher and canon residentiary of Chichester Cathedral
- 1879: William Awdry, the first Bishop of Southampton
- 1886: Josiah Sanders Teulon
- 1899: Herbert Rickard until 1918
- 1919: Herman Leonard Pass, reopened the college after the First World War
- 1933: Charles Scott Gillett
- 1946: John Moorman, Bishop of Ripon from 1956 to 1975
- 1956: Cheslyn Jones
- 1971: Alan Wilkinson
- 1975: Robert John Halliburton
- 1982: John Hind, Bishop of Chichester
- 1991: Peter Atkinson, Dean of Worcester.

== Notable alumni ==
- James Ayong (1944-2018), Archbishop of Papua New Guinea
- George Austin (1931-2019), Archdeacon of York
- Paul-Gordon Chandler (born 1964), former Bishop of Wyoming, and author
- Barry Curtis (born 1933), Bishop of Calgary and Metropolitan of Rupert's Land
- Edwin Dodgson (1846–1918), missionary
- John Ford (born 1952), Bishop of The Murray, formerly Bishop of Plymouth
- Arthur John Hawes (born 1943), Archdeacon of Lincoln
- Christopher Hewetson (born 1937), Archdeacon of Chester
- Michael Houghton (1949–1999), Bishop of Ebbsfleet
- Roger Jupp (born 1956), Bishop of Popondetta
- Morris Maddocks (1928–2008), assistant bishop in the Diocese of Chichester
- David Nicholls (1936–96), theologian
- Conrad Noel (1869-1942), noted Christian Socialist known as the 'Red Vicar'
- Ernest Raymond (1888–1974), novelist
- David Rossdale (born 1953), Bishop of Grimsby
- Oswald Trellis (born 1935), Dean of St George's Cathedral, Georgetown
- Victor Whitechurch (1868-1933), writer of detective fiction
- Stephen Lake (born 1963), Dean of Gloucester
