= Archdeacon of Plymouth =

Church of England ecclesiastical office

The Archdeacon of Plymouth is a senior clergy position in the Church of England Diocese of Exeter and is responsible for the supervision of the clergy within the five rural deaneries: Ivybridge, Plymouth Moorside, Plymouth Devonport, Plymouth Sutton and Tavistock.

The archdeaconry was created by an Order-in-Council splitting the Archdeaconry of Totnes on 22 March 1918. The current archdeacon is Jane Bakker.

== List of archdeacons ==
- 1918 – 1920 (res.): Arthur Perowne
- 1921 – 28 April 1928 (d.): Ernest Newman
- 1928 – 1950 (ret.): Whitfield Daukes (also Bishop suffragan of Plymouth from 1934)
- 1950 – 1962 (ret.): Norman Clarke, Bishop suffragan of Plymouth
- 1962 – 1978 (res.): Frederick Matthews (afterwards archdeacon emeritus)
- 1978 – 1982 (res.): Kenneth Newing (became Bishop suffragan of Plymouth)
- 1982 – 2000 (ret.): Robin Ellis
- 2001 – 2010 (ret.): Tony Wilds
- 2010 – 31 December 2018 (ret.): Ian Chandler (on leave during 2018)
- 18 June 2019 – 30 April 2023 (ret.): Nick Shutt (Acting since 2018)
- 13 June 2023 – present: Jane Bakker
