= Archbishop of Adelaide =

Archbishop of Adelaide may refer to:

- Anglican Archbishop of Adelaide
- Roman Catholic Archbishop of Adelaide
