= Henry Malden =

British academic (1800–1876)

Henry Malden (1800–1876) was a British academic.

== Life ==
He was the son of Jonas Malden, a Putney surgeon. Malden attended Preston's School and was a scholar at Trinity College, Cambridge, where he obtained a B.A. in 1822 and an M.A. in 1825. He was the friend and associate of Thomas Babington Macaulay and John Moultrie.

Malden was Professor of Greek at University College London from 1831 until 1876.

In 1833 he agreed to become joint headmaster (with the Professor of Latin) of University College School, a post he held until 1846.

On 7 July 1843 at the Church of St. Mary & St. Nicholas, Leatherhead, in Surrey he married Georgiana Augusta Drinkwater Bethune (1810–1888), daughter of Colonel John Drinkwater Bethune and his wife Eleanor. They had three children, including the historian H. E. Malden.

== Works ==
- History of Rome, Library of Useful Knowledge, London: Baldwin & Cradock, 1830.
