= Graham Walden =

Australian Anglican bishop

Graham Howard Walden OBE (19 March 1931 – 27 November 2017) was an Australian Anglican bishop.

Walden was born in 1931 and educated at the University of Queensland. He was ordained deacon in 1954 and priest in 1955. After curacies in London he returned to Australia to join the Bush Brotherhood and served in the Diocese of Carpentaria from 1958 to 1963. In that year he became priest in charge at Gulargambone. He was vice-principal of the Torres Straights Missionary College from 1963 to 1965; rector of Mudgee from 1965 to 1970; archdeacon of Barker from 1968 to 1970 and Archdeacon of Ballarat from 1970. In 1981 he was consecrated assistant bishop for the Diocese of Ballarat; and became Bishop of The Murray in 1989.

Walden retired in 2001 and died on 27 November 2017.

== Notes ==
Anglican Communion titles
Preceded by Robert Porter	Bishop of The Murrary; 1989–2001	Succeeded by Ross Davies
