= A. Nutter Thomas =

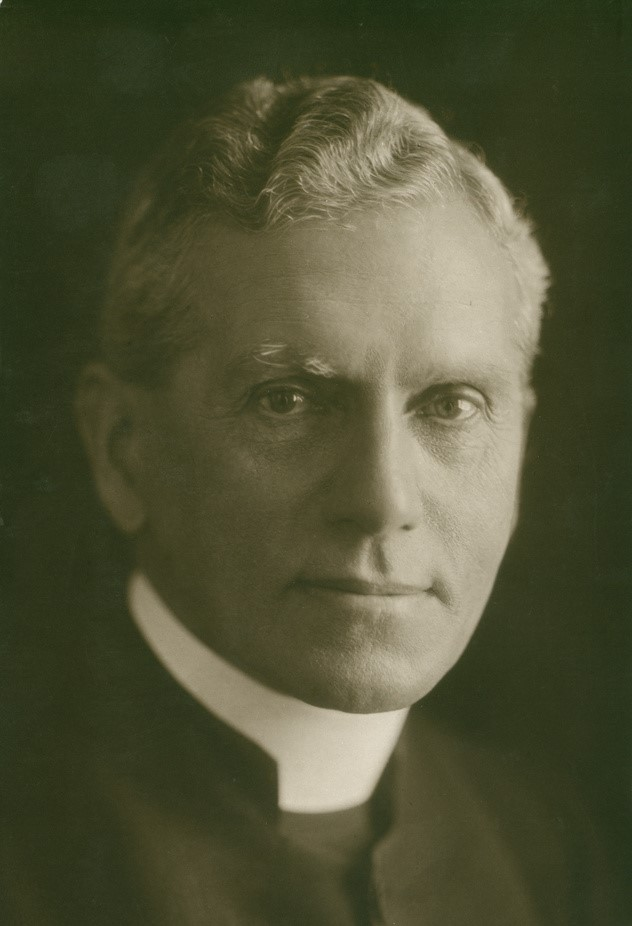

Arthur Nutter Thomas (11 December 1869 – 10 April 1954), commonly referred to as Dr Nutter Thomas or A. Nutter Thomas, was the Anglican Bishop of Adelaide, South Australia, from 1906 to 1940.

== Early life ==
Nutter Thomas was born in Hackney, London, to Charles James Thomas and his wife Mary Matilda Thomas, née Nutter. He was educated at Pembroke College of the University of Cambridge and was awarded a bachelor's degree in 1893, a master's degree in 1895 and a Doctor of Divinity degree in 1906. He was made deacon on 20 May 1894, by Walsham How, Bishop of Wakefield, at Wakefield Cathedral; ordained priest the following year; and consecrated a bishop on Candlemas 1906 (2 February) at Westminster Abbey, by Randall Davidson, Archbishop of Canterbury. He arrived in South Australia two months later with his wife. On retirement he had spent over 34 years as a bishop, the longest for an Anglican bishop in Australia at that time.

Thomas's episcopacy as Bishop of Adelaide was contemporaneous with the 40-year incumbency at St George's Church, Goodwood of Canon Percy Wise, with whom he had a long and frosty relationship, Thomas being a traditional Anglican, a follower of the Book of Common Prayer, and Wise being radically Anglo-Catholic.

== Family ==
Nutter Thomas married Mary Theodora Lewis before leaving England. They had two daughters and a son, all born at Bishop's Court, North Adelaide.

- Ursula Nutter Thomas (10 January 1908 – ) married the Rev. William C. S. Johnson on 20 April 1937
- M(ary) Katherine Nutter Thomas (16 August 1910 – ) married the Rt Rev. Hubert Baddeley on 13 November 1935. He was Bishop of Melanesia from 1932 to 1947.
- Christopher Nutter Thomas (11 July 1912 – 21 March 1986) was appointed curate to the Rev. F. E. Thornton, at Holy Trinity Church, Kew, Victoria, in 1946, and was later a priest and canon.

Anglican Communion titles
Preceded by John Harmer	Bishop of Adelaide; 1906–1940	Succeeded by Bryan Robin
