= Bryan Robin =

Australian Anglican bishop

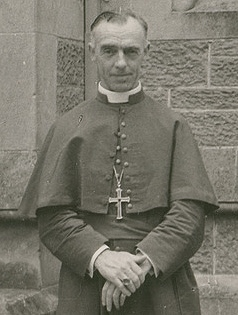
Robin in 1942

Bryan Percival Robin (12 January 1887 – 17 June 1969) was bishop of the Anglican Diocese of Adelaide, South Australia from 1941 to 1956.

== Early life ==
Robin was educated at Rossall School and the University of Liverpool.

== Religious life ==
Robin was made a deacon at Michaelmas 1910 (25 September) and ordained a priest the next Michaelmas (24 September 1911) – both times by William Boyd Carpenter, Bishop of Ripon, at Ripon Cathedral. After a curacy at St Margaret's Ilkley he was a member of the Bush Brotherhood of St Barnabas in Northern Queensland from 1914 to 1921. He published a book "The Sundowner" of his experience as a bush brother which attracted others to join the brotherhood. He was canon and Sub-Dean of St James's Cathedral, Townsville and then Warden of St John's College, Brisbane. Returning to England he was Rector of Woodchurch and also Rural Dean of Wirrall North until his appointment as Bishop of Adelaide. He was consecrated bishop on 25 July 1941 at Westminster Abbey. Robin encouraged members of the Society of the Sacred Mission to come to Adelaide from Kelham in England to establish a theological college at St Michael's House in 1947 in order to boost clergy numbers.

In 1956 he retired and returned to England, where he served as Assistant Bishop of Portsmouth from 1958 to 1967.

== Later life ==
On 17 June 1969 Robin died in his home at Petersfield, Hampshire. He was cremated.

Anglican Communion titles
Preceded by A. Nutter Thomas	Bishop of Adelaide; 1941–1956	Succeeded by Tom Reed
