= Robert Porter (bishop) =

Robert George Porter OBE was an Australian Anglican bishop in the 20th century.

Porter was educated at St John's College, Morpeth, and Moore Theological College in Sydney. He was ordained deacon in 1947 and priest in 1948. He served in New Guinea until 1957 when he became Archdeacon of Ballarat. In 1970 he became Bishop of The Murray until his retirement in 1989.

Anglican Communion titles
New office	Bishop of The Murray; 1970–1989	Succeeded by Graham Walden
