= Nick Shutt =

English Anglican priest

Nicholas Stephen Shutt (born 1958) is a retired Church of England priest who served as Archdeacon of Plymouth from 2019 until his retirement in 2023.

Shutt was educated at Queen Mary College, London and practiced as a solicitor until his call to ordination. He served as a Non Stipendiary Minister, Priest in charge and Rector of Yelverton before his appointment as Archdeacon. He retired effective 30 April 2023.

Church of England titles
Preceded by Ian Chandler	Archdeacon of Plymouth; 2019–2023	Succeeded by Jane Bakker
