= James Grier =

English Anglican bishop

The Right Reverend James Grier
- Bishop of Plymouth
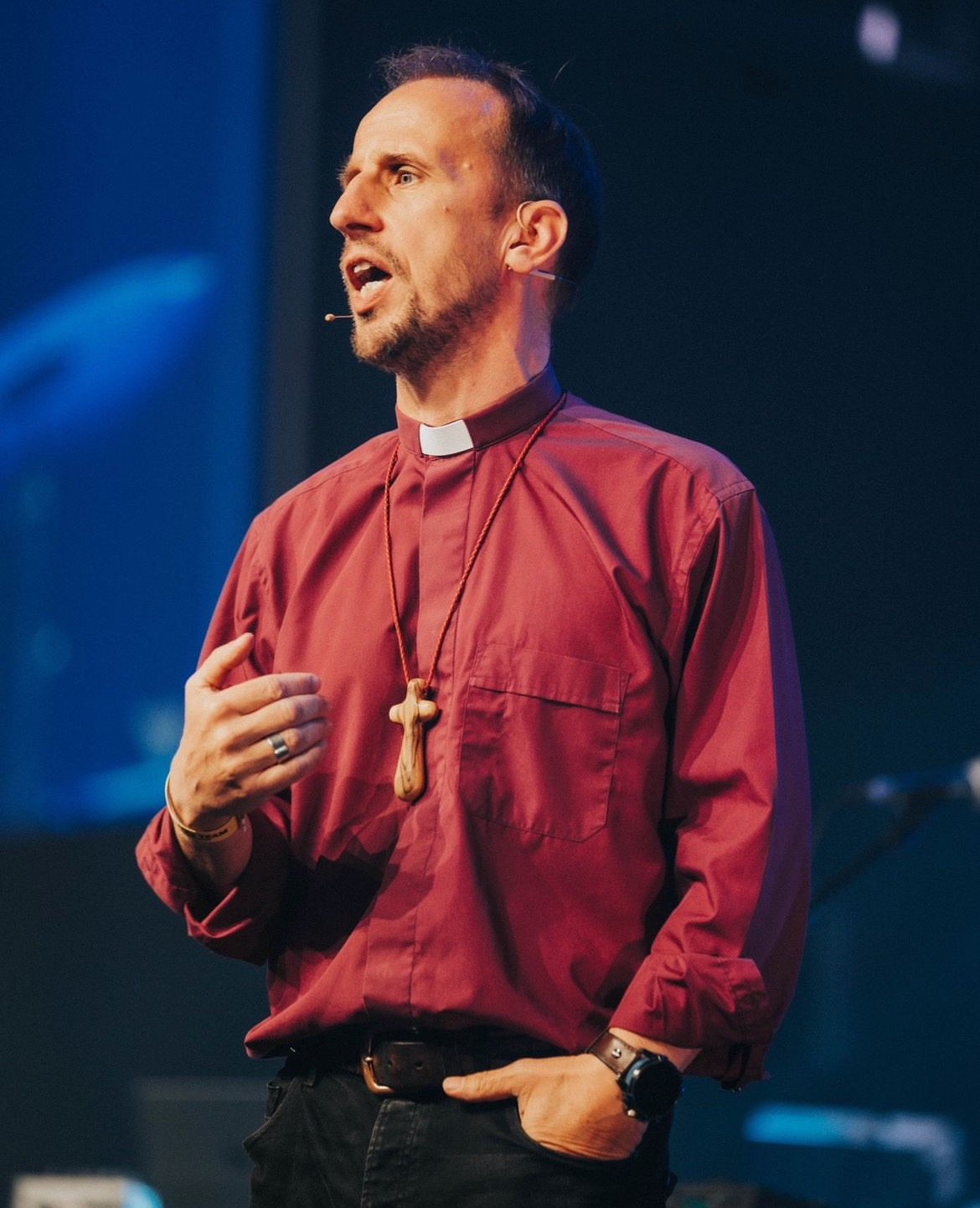
- Grier in 2023
- Church: Church of England
- Diocese: Diocese of Exeter
- In office: 2022 to present
- Predecessor: Nick McKinnel

Orders
- Ordination: 1998
- Consecration: 29 September 2022 by Justin Welby

Personal details
- Born: 1974 (age 51–52) Plymouth, Devon, England
- Denomination: Anglican
- Spouse: Liz
- Children: 2
- Education: St Peter's College, Oxford

James Grier (born 1974) is an English Anglican bishop. He currently serves as Bishop of Plymouth.

== Early life ==
James Grier was born in 1974, to Sara and John Grier. His father was an NHS GP, and his mother was a nurse who went on to become President of Plymouth Age Concern. He grew-up in the suburb of Tamerton Foliot, helping at the local church as an altar server. He attended the youth group at the minster church of St Andrew's before helping start a youth group at his home church, St Mary's, Tamerton Foliot.

He studied theology at St Peter's College, Oxford graduating Bachelor of Arts (BA): this was later promoted to Master of Arts (MA) as per tradition. He then trained for ordination at Wycliffe Hall, Oxford, an evangelical theological college, after working as lay-assistant at St Aldate's Church for a year.

== Ordained ministry ==
Grier was ordained in the Church of England in 1998. He served his curacy in the Diocese of Oxford at St Andrew's Church. James served as Associate Vicar at St John the Baptist, Harborne Heath, in the Diocese of Birmingham from 2002. He was appointed Team Vicar of St Michael and All Angels, Pinhoe in the Diocese of Exeter in 2007, also serving as Diocesan Youth Advisor. As Youth Advisor, he established Unlimited Church, which became a Bishop's Mission Order in 2012. In 2019, James took up the role of Diocesan Mission Enabler. From 2020 to 2022, he was also a prebendary of Exeter Cathedral.

=== Episcopal ministry ===
It was announced on 6 July 2022 that James Grier would be the next Bishop of Plymouth. On 29 September 2022, he was consecrated as the eleventh Bishop of Plymouth by Justin Welby, Archbishop of Canterbury, at Westminster Abbey, the first new bishop to swear an oath of allegiance to King Charles III.

=== Views ===
In 2023, in a pastoral letter from the bishops of the Diocese of Exeter (including Grier), it was stated that they welcome "the proposed prayers of thanksgiving, dedication and God's blessing for same sex couples": this was in reaction to the Living in Love and Faith process that concluded with the suggestion that the Church of England would introduce a service of blessing for same sex couples.

== Personal life ==
He is married to Rev Dr Liz Grier, an academic and musician, who is currently curate at St Mellitus College Plymouth. They have two sons.

== Styles ==
- The Reverend James Grier (1999–2020)
- The Reverend Prebendary James Grier (2020–2022)
- The Right Reverend James Grier (2022–present)
