= Nick McKinnel =

Bishop of Plymouth; Bishop of Crediton; British Anglican bishop

The Right Reverend Nick McKinnel
- Bishop of Plymouth
- Church: Church of England
- Diocese: Diocese of Exeter
- In office: 2015–2022
- Predecessor: John Ford
- Successor: James Grier
- Other post: Bishop of Crediton (2012–2015)

Orders
- Ordination: 1980
- Consecration: 30 November 2012 by Rowan Williams

Personal details
- Born: 19 August 1954 (age 72) Liverpool England
- Denomination: Anglican
- Spouse: Jan
- Children: 4
- Education: Queens' College, Cambridge

Nicholas Howard Paul McKinnel (born 19 August 1954) is an English retired Anglican bishop. He served as Bishop of Plymouth (2015–2022) and Bishop of Crediton (2012–2015), both suffragan bishoprics in the Diocese of Exeter.

== Early life ==
McKinnel was born on 19 August 1954. He studied at Queens' College, Cambridge, graduating Bachelor of Arts (BA): this was later promoted to Master of Arts (MA Cantab) as per tradition. He then trained for ordination at Wycliffe Hall, Oxford, an Anglican theological college.

== Ordained ministry ==
McKinnel was ordained in the Church of England in 1980. He served his curacy in the Diocese of London from 1980 to 1983. He served as a chaplain at the University of Liverpool from 1983 to 1987. From 1994 to 2012, he was Rector of the Minster Church of St Andrew, Plymouth. From 2002 to 2012, he was also a prebendary of Exeter Cathedral.

In October 2012, it was announced that McKinnel was to become the Bishop of Crediton. On 30 November 2012, he was consecrated as the eighth Bishop of Crediton by Rowan Williams, Archbishop of Canterbury, at Southwark Cathedral. This was the final consecration undertaken by Williams before he stood down as Archbishop of Canterbury.

In December 2014, it was announced that McKinnel would become the Bishop of Plymouth. He was duly translated on 19 April 2015. In January 2022, it was announced that he would retire in August 2022, aged 68.

== Later life ==
McKinnel was appointed High Sheriff of Devon for 2023.

== Honours ==
McKinnel was awarded an honorary Doctorate of Theology from Plymouth University in 2013.

== Styles ==
- The Reverend Nick McKinnel (1980–2002)
- The Reverend Prebendary Nick McKinnel (2002–2012)
- The Right Reverend Nick McKinnel (2012–present)

Church of England titles
Preceded by Bob Evens	Bishop of Crediton; 2012–2015	Succeeded by Sarah Mullally
Preceded by John Ford	Bishop of Plymouth; 2015–2022	Succeeded by James Grier
