= Howard Masterman =

John Howard Bertram Masterman (1867–1933) was the first Anglican Bishop of Plymouth from 1923 to 1933.

In authorship he is known as J. H. B. Masterman. His works ranged from religion to political and in the First World War he was asked to write two of the tracts distributed to troops to assure them that they were doing God's will.

== Life ==
He was the second son of Thomas W. Masterman of Rotherfield Hall in Sussex. His younger brother was the natural historian Arthur Masterman FRS FRSE.

Masterman was the grandson of William Brodie Gurney (and a distant relation to Elizabeth Fry through him) and the brother of the Liberal MP Charles Frederick Gurney Masterman. He was the husband of Theresa and father of Cyril Masterman OBE.

Masterman was educated at University College School and St John's College, Cambridge. He was ordained deacon in 1893; and priest in 1894. He was lecturer in Church History at St John's from 1894 to 1896; vicar of St Aubyn, Devonport from 1896 to 1900; warden of Queen's College, Birmingham from 1901 to 1907; vicar of St Michael, Coventry from 1907 to 1912; and rector of St Mary-le-Bow from 1912 to 1922.

== Publications ==
- A History of the British Constitution
- The Dawn of Mediaeval Europe, 476-918 (Six Ages of European History: Vol. 1) (1909)
- Parliament: Its History and Work (1912)
- The Life Beyond Death war tract no.7 (1914)
- The King Needs You war tract no.8 (1914)
- The Age of Milton (1915)
- A Century of British Foreign Policy (1919)
- Studies in the Book of Revelation (1919)
- Clerical Incomes
- Birmingham: The Story of English Towns (1920)

His hymn, "Almighty Father, who dost give", was included in The Australian Hymn Book, 1977, no.541, set to the tune "Vermont" by the Australian composer, Alfred Ernest Floyd.

== Notes ==
Church of England titles
Preceded by Inaugural appointment	Bishop of Plymouth; 1923–1933	Succeeded by Whitfield Daukes
