= University College School =

Public school in Hampstead, London

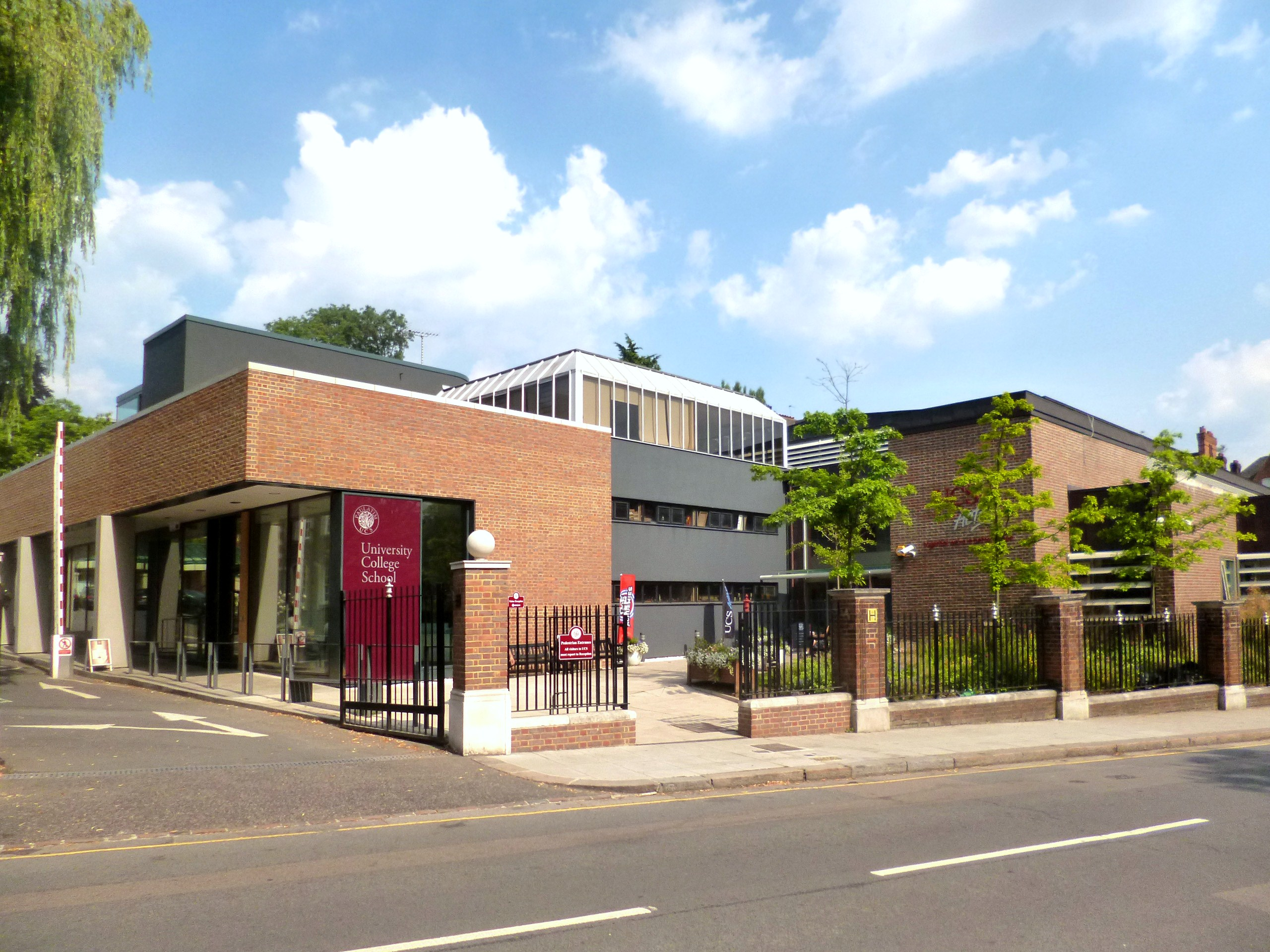
- University College School Entrance

Location
- Frognal, Hampstead, London, NW3; England; 51.5533°N 0.1811°W

Information
- Type: Public school Private day school
- Motto: Latin: Paulatim Sed Fermiter ("Slowly but surely")
- Established: 1830; 196 years ago
- Local authority: Camden
- Department for Education URN: 100065 Tables
- Chair of council: Stephen Warshaw
- Headmaster: Mark Beard
- Gender: Boys; coeducational sixth form
- Age: 3 to 18
- Enrolment: 1180~
- Colours: Maroon, black
- Alumni: Old Gowers
- Website: ucs.org.uk

University College School, also known as UCS, is a private day school in Frognal, Hampstead, London, England. The school was founded in 1830 by University College London.

The UCS Hampstead Foundation is composed of three main entities: the Pre-Prep (previously known as The Phoenix School) for ages 3 to 7 on the Finchley Road site, acquired by UCS in 2003; the Junior Branch, for boys aged 7 to 11 on the Holly Hill site in Hampstead; and the Senior School, for boys aged 11 to 16 and co-educational for ages 16 to 18 on the Frognal site, which is the largest school site. The main campus and the Great Hall are noted examples of Edwardian architecture. Inside the hall is a Walker pipe organ, used for school concerts, professional recordings and other festivities. The school also owns playing fields situated in Ranulf Road in West Hampstead, used for training, physical education and sporting fixtures.

UCS is a member of the Eton Group of twelve independent schools and the Headmasters' and Headmistresses' Conference. It has ties with the Equatorial College School in Uganda.

== History ==
University College School, Frognal, Hampstead in the early twentieth century

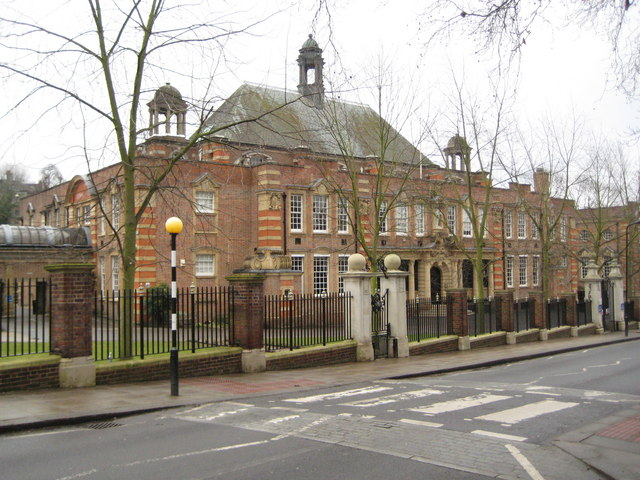

University College School was founded in 1830 as part of University College London. It moved to its current location in Hampstead in 1907. Continuing the long tradition of dissenting academies, the University of London had been inspired by the work of Jeremy Bentham and others to provide opportunities for higher education regardless of religious beliefs.

At the time, only members of the established Church could study at Cambridge and Oxford (the only other universities in England at the time) while similar religious tests were imposed at the other universities dating from the medieval and renaissance periods present in the rest of the British Isles, namely St Andrews, Glasgow, Aberdeen, Edinburgh and Dublin. Furthermore, the subjects taught at these Ancient Universities during this period, especially at Cambridge and Oxford, were relatively narrow, with classical subjects and divinity dominating.

Several of the founders of the University of London are associated with the founding of the school; they include Henry Brougham, 1st Baron Brougham and Vaux (who appears to be singled out as the ring leader in A tradition for Freedom), Lord Auckland (probably George Eden, 1st Earl of Auckland), William Bingham Baring, 2nd Baron Ashburton, Sir Isaac Lyon Goldsmid, Henry Hallam, Leonard Horner (The Royal Society of Edinburgh has described UCS as his 'monument'), James Mill, Viscount Sandon (probably either Dudley Ryder, 1st Earl of Harrowby or Dudley Ryder, 2nd Earl of Harrowby), James Lock, Stephen Lushington D.C.L. M.P., John Smith M.P., and Henry Waymouth.

The first headmaster was Henry Browne, who quickly caused controversy, by publishing a prospectus for the school which appeared to include some type of communal worship. This was replaced with a new version which also stated that the school would not use corporal punishment. The school opened at 16 Gower Street on 1 November 1830 under the name 'The London University School'. Browne soon resigned from his position and was replaced by John Walker (an assistant master). By February 1831 it had outgrown its quarters, in October 1831, the council of UCL agreed to formally take over the school and it was brought within the walls of the college in 1832, with a joint headmastership of Professors Thomas Hewitt Key and Henry Malden.

The school was never a boarding school; it was one of the first schools to teach modern languages and sciences. Originally, there were no compulsory subjects and no rigid form system. Most boys learnt Latin and French, and many learnt German (an unusual subject to offer at that time). Mathematics, chemistry, Classical Greek and English were also taught. There was no religious teaching. Under the University College London (Transfer) Act 1905 (5 Edw. 7. c. xci), University College London became part of the federal University of London, and the school was created as a separate corporation.

UCS moved to new purpose-built buildings in Frognal in Hampstead in 1907, which were opened by Edward VII with the Archbishop of Canterbury in attendance on 27 July. Kikuchi Dairoku was invited to the first annual prize giving at Frognal where he represented those who had received their prizes at Gower Street. The new school buildings were designed by Arnold Mitchell and built by the Dove Brothers. The main school block has been Grade II listed on the National Heritage List for England since May 1974.

Prince Edward, Duke of Kent, opened the Sixth Form Centre (in the Kent Building, which also houses the Lund Theatre) in 1974. Elizabeth II visited the school in 1980 to celebrate its 150th anniversary and to inaugurate the rebuilt hall, which had been destroyed by fire in 1978. In 2021, UCS opened a new, state of the art, sixth form center known as the 'AKO Sixth Form Center'.

In 2006 the Sir Roger Bannister Sports Centre was officially opened by Bannister (himself an Old Gower), which is now known as UCS Active, a gym with memberships open to the public for use of the school tennis courts, pool, gym and exercise classes.

In 2007 a new art, design technology and modern languages building came into use and was opened as the Jeremy Bentham building by Prince Richard, Duke of Gloucester on 22 May 2008. In 2009, girls were admitted into the newly co-educational sixth form for the first time.

== Traditions ==
The school motto is Paulatim Sed Firmiter (Latin for "Slowly but surely"). In 2016, the school updated its logo to incorporate its widely known name of UCS Hampstead and to include the full motto in its roundel emblem. UCS publishes a termly online newsletter called The Frognal and a yearly printed magazine called The Gower sent to current and past pupils.

The school song, Paulatim, is sung at the end of every term and the annual speech day and prize giving ceremony. This usually involves pupils throwing their hands in the air in sets of threes, to the phrase Paulatim, Paulatim, Paulatim. This tradition originated with the throwing of printed song sheets into the air.

The Senior School is divided into three sections by age, and each year has a name. Each section is led by a head of section.

- Lower School – Entry (Year 7, ages 11–12) and Shell (Year 8, ages 12–13)
- Middle School – Lower Remove (Year 9, ages 13–14), Remove (Year 10, ages 14–15) and Upper Remove (Year 11, ages 15–16)
- Upper School – Transitus (Year 12, ages 16–17) and Sixth (Year 13, ages 17–18)

Pupils in the lower school are arranged into houses, each named after an influential figure with a connection to North London. In the lower school, there is one form per year in each house. The five houses are as follows: Bannister (black), Bonnington (silver), Kendall (blue), MacArthur (green), and Seacole (yellow).

Pupils in the middle school and upper school are arranged into 'Demes', each named after a former prominent member of staff. This is similar to a school house. The current arrangement has been in place since 1946, shortly after a large influx of new pupils (replacing the previous eight houses), although this was in discussion in years prior to the switch. In the middle school, the school blazer carries a logo on the breast pocket, coloured according to the pupil's Deme. There are six Demes, each with one or two corresponding colours: Baxters (blue), Black Hawkins (yellow), Evans (pink and black), Flooks (green), Olders (silver), and Underwoods (purple). As well as a Deme warden (housemaster/housemistress), each deme has deme captains (head of house) who are students in the Sixth who are chosen each year by their Deme warden. Colours are awarded through an accumulation of academic and extra-curricular achievements. In the Middle School, there are three separate ties awarded to pupils upon reaching milestones of ten, twenty, and thirty certificates. Pupils in the lower school receive similar awards, in the form of a tie followed by a school logo to be sewn onto the breast pocket of the student's blazer, awarded upon the achievement of ten and twenty-two certificates respectively. There are regular inter-deme competitions in sport, music, drama, and other subjects throughout the year.

== Admissions ==
There are five main points of entry for prospective pupils:

- Pre-prep, at age 4, by internal exam and assessment. As of 2019 the pre-prep no longer has a nursery section.
- Junior branch, at age 7, judged by a combination of internal exam and interview. As of 2010, the junior branch no longer operates an 8+ entry point.
- Lower school, at age 11, judged by a combination of internal exam and interview.
- Upper school, at age 16, judged by a cognitive ability exam and interviews. All offers are conditional upon GCSE results. This point of entry is available for girls as well as boys and each year; around 60–70 new girls are accepted into the school each year.

== Notable former pupils ==
Former pupils are known as Old Gowers, which was derived from Gower Street where the school was founded. Notable Old Gowers include:

- Thomas Ades – composer
- Roger Bannister – athlete, first man to run the 4-minute mile
- Dirk Bogarde – actor
- Chris Bonington – mountaineer
- William Hardwick Bradbury – printer and publisher
- Simon Brodkin - British comedian
- Rob Buckman – doctor and medical writer
- Bertie Carvel – actor and singer
- Joseph Chamberlain – Leader of the Opposition, Late Victorian and Edwardian-era politician
- Gordon Corera – BBC security correspondent
- Maurice Cornforth – Marxist philosopher
- Paul Dacre – editor of the Daily Mail
- Hugh Dennis – comedian and writer
- Luke Brandon Field – actor
- Horace Field – architect
- Daniel Finkelstein – The Times executive editor, journalist
- James Krishna Floyd – actor and filmmaker
- Ford Madox Ford – novelist
- Jonathan Freedland – writer and journalist
- Clive Gardiner – artist, designer and illustrator
- Alex Garland – author and screenwriter
- William Court Gully, 1st Viscount Selby – Speaker of the House of Commons
- Bernard Hart – psychiatrist (1945)
- Tristram Hunt – historian and former Labour MP
- Oliver Hart – economist, awarded the Nobel Memorial Prize in Economic Sciences in 2016
- Leonard Huxley – author and teacher
- Rufus Isaacs – Viceroy of India, Lord Chief Justice of England, and Foreign Secretary
- Ian Katz – BBC Newsnight editor
- Joseph Kerman – musicologist
- Eylon Levy – Former Israeli government spokesman
- Edward Levy-Lawson – editor of the Daily Telegraph
- Colin Marshall, Baron Marshall of Knightsbridge – businessman, Former CEO of British Airways
- Ernest William Moir – civil engineer
- David McCallum – actor, Ilya Kuryakin, Man from UNCLE
- Max Minghella – actor
- Jimmy Napes – British songwriter, producer and musician
- David Patrikarakos – author and journalist
- Karl Pearson – mathematician, inventor of statistical methods
- Sir Roger Penrose – mathematical physicist, awarded the Nobel Prize in Physics in 2020
- Joe Powell (politician) – Labour party MP
- Paul Westmacott Richards, botanist, bryologist and lichenologist
- Daniel Roche – actor
- Herbert Samuel – leader of the Liberal Party, Home Secretary and High Commissioner for Palestine
- Philippe Sands – author and human rights lawyer
- Will Self – writer and TV presenter
- Joseph Horovitz – composer and conductor
- Stephen Spender – poet
- Mark Turin – anthropologist and linguist
- Sir Julius Vogel – former New Zealand Premier
- Dan Wagner – internet entrepreneur
- Julian Lloyd Webber – musician
- Geoffrey Wheatcroft – journalist and writer

== Notable staff ==
Notable former staff include:

- Alexander William Williamson; according to A Tradition for Freedom he taught pupils at the school.
- Augustus De Morgan, distinguished mathematician. First professor of mathematics, University College London; according to the British Society for the History of Mathematics, taught pupils when the distinctions between the school and college were somewhat blurred. Believed to have taught James Joseph Sylvester. Was the first president of the London Mathematical Society. The De Morgan Medal is named in his honour. It has been awarded to at least one Old Gower – Sir Roger Penrose.
- Carey Foster, professor of physics at University College London
- G. S. Carr, according to the British Society for the History of Mathematics
- Henry Malden, headmaster
- John Williams, taught at UCS post World War II, first Master of Music at St Peter ad Vincula, Tower of London, which was then a royal chapel. Professor at the Royal College of Music. Honorary fellow of the Royal College of Music and Fellow of the Royal Society of Arts
- Sir William Smith, lexicographer and teacher
- Henry Browne, headmaster
- Thomas Archer Hirst, teacher 1860–1864. Nominated and admitted to the Royal Society whilst teaching at UCS. Later, professor of physics, University College London
- Thomas Hewitt Key, headmaster
- Kenneth Durham, headmaster. Chairman of the Headmasters' and Headmistresses' Conference 2011–2012
