= Ian Chandler (priest) =

The Reverend Ian Chandler
- Archdeacon of Plymouth
- Church: Church of England
- Province: Province of Canterbury
- Diocese: Diocese of Exeter
- In office: 2010 to 31 December 2018
- Predecessor: Tony Wilds
- Other posts: Vicar, St Richard's, Haywards Heath (2000-2010); Domestic Chaplain to the Bishop of Chichester (1996-2000)

Orders
- Ordination: 1993

Personal details
- Born: 9 November 1965 (age 60)
- Denomination: Anglicanism
- Profession: Priest
- Education: King's College London

Ian Nigel Chandler (born 9 November 1965) is a British retired Anglican priest. From 2010 to 2018, he served as Archdeacon of Plymouth in the Diocese of Exeter.

Chandler was educated at King's College London and ordained in 1993. After a curacy at All Saints' Hove he was domestic chaplain to Eric Kemp, the Bishop of Chichester, from 1996 to 2000 when he became Vicar of St Richard's Haywards Heath, a position he held until his archdeacon’s appointment. He retired effective 31 December 2018.

Church of England titles
Preceded by Tony Wilds	Archdeacon of Plymouth; 2010–2018	Nick Shutt
