= Tom Reed (bishop) =

Thomas Thornton Reed CBE (9 September 1902 – 19 August 1995) was an Anglican bishop.

== Early life ==
Reed was educated at the Collegiate School of St Peter, Adelaide and Trinity College, University of Melbourne. He was ordained in 1927 and after a curacy at St Augustine's, Unley he was priest in charge of the Berri Mission then a resident tutor at St Mark's College, University of Adelaide. From 1936 to 1954 he held incumbencies at Henley Beach and Rose Park. He was then successively an archdeacon and dean before becoming the Bishop of Adelaide. He was consecrated a bishop on 30 May 1957 at St Peter's Cathedral, Adelaide. When the Province of South Australia included three dioceses with the creation of the Diocese of the Murray his position became that of Archbishop of Adelaide.

Anglican Communion titles
Preceded by Bryan Robin	Bishop of Adelaide; 1957–1970	Succeeded by himself as Archbishop of Adelaide
Preceded by himself as Bishop of Adelaide	Archbishop of Adelaide; 1970–1975	Succeeded by Keith Rayner
