= Richard Cartwright (bishop) =

Richard Fox Cartwright (10 November 1913 – 10 April 2009) was the Anglican Bishop of Plymouth from 1972 to 1982.

Cartwright was born son of George Frederick Cartwright (1874–1938), M.A., vicar of Plumstead from 1928 to 1938, Organising Secretary of the White Cross League from 1910 to 1915; he was educated at The King's School, Canterbury and Pembroke College, Cambridge. After he was deaconed (during Advent 1936 {19 December}) and priested (the following Advent {18 December 1937}) — both times by Richard Parsons, Bishop of Southwark, at Southwark Cathedral, he was a curate at St Anselm's Kennington Cross and then priest in charge of Lower Kingswood. He was then Vicar of Surbiton, Redcliffe, Bristol and Silverton, Devon before being ordained to the episcopate. He was consecrated on by Michael Ramsey, Archbishop of Canterbury, on 29 September 1972 at Westminster Abbey; in retirement he was an assistant bishop in the Diocese of Truro.

He married Rosemary Magdalen (1919-2002), daughter of Lloyd's member Francis Evelyn Bray, of Woking, in 1947, and had a son and three daughters. A daughter, Jane, married Miranda (then Roger) Cunliffe Turner, son of Sir (Ronald) Mark Cunliffe Turner (1906-1980), chairman of BHS; their son is the musician Frank Turner.

== Notes ==
Church of England titles
Preceded by Wilfrid Guy Sanderson	Bishop of Plymouth; 1972 – 1982	Succeeded by Kenneth Albert Newing
