= Geoffrey Smith (bishop) =

Australian Anglican archbishop

The Most Reverend Geoffrey Smith
- Primate of Australia; Archbishop of Adelaide
- Church: Anglican Church of Australia
- Province: South Australia
- Diocese: Adelaide
- Elected: 7 April 2020 (as primate)
- In office: 2020–2025 (as primate); 2017–2025 (as archbishop)
- Predecessor: Philip Freier (as primate); Jeffrey Driver (as archbishop)
- Successor: Mark Short (as primate); Brad Billings (as archbishop)
- Previous posts: Assistant bishop, Brisbane (2007–2017)

Orders
- Ordination: 1982
- Consecration: 25 July 2007

Personal details
- Born: 1958 or 1959 (age 66–67) Brisbane
- Spouse: Lynn
- Children: 2
- Education: University of Queensland

Geoffrey Martyn Smith (born 1958–59) is a retired Australian Anglican bishop who served as the Archbishop of Adelaide from 28 April 2017 to 8 November 2025 and who was Primate of Australia from April 2020 through October 2025. Immediately prior to serving as archbishop, Smith was an assistant bishop, general manager and registrar of the Anglican Diocese of Brisbane.

Smith's past roles included rector of Taraka, Papua New Guinea, first vicar of the parochial district of Sawtell-Bonville, national director of the Anglican Board of Mission – Australia and Bishop of the Southern Region in the Diocese of Brisbane. He was ordained a deacon at Grafton Anglican church in 1982 and priest in 1983.

Smith stepped down as primate on 31 October 2025 and was succeeded by Mark Short. He retired as Archbishop of Adelaide on 8 November 2025. He was succeeded as archbishop by Bradley Billings.

Anglican Communion titles
Preceded by Jeffrey Driver	Archbishop of Adelaide; 2017–2025	Succeeded by Brad Billings
Preceded by Philip Freier	Primate of Australia; 2020–2025	Succeeded by Mark Short
