= H. E. Malden =

Henry Elliot Malden (8 May 1849, in Bloomsbury – March 1931, in Dorking), known as H. E. Malden, was, for 30 years, honorary secretary of the Royal Historical Society, of which he was a Fellow.

The son of Henry Malden, a professor of Greek, he was educated at Queen Elizabeth's School, Ipswich and Trinity Hall, Cambridge, where he obtained, in 1872, a second-class degree in the Classical Tripos. He won the Chancellor's Medal for English verse in 1871. Malden became a local historian, editing the Victoria County History of Surrey.

He married, in 1879, Margaret Eleanor Whatman of Kitlands, (Note: A small estate near Dorking) Surrey and had five sons and three daughters.

== Selected publications ==
=== Articles ===
- Malden, Henry Elliot (1880). "Alexander the Great in Affghanistan". Transactions of the Royal Historical Society. 8: 223–229. doi:10.2307/3677829. JSTOR 3677829.
- Malden, Henry Elliot (1883). "History on the Face of England". Transactions of the Royal Historical Society. 1: 1–17. doi:10.2307/3677959. JSTOR 3677959.
- Malden, H. E. (1889). "Historic Genealogy". Transactions of the Royal Historical Society. 4: 103–123. doi:10.2307/3678163. JSTOR 3678163.
- Malden, Henry Elliot; Gardiner, Samuel R. (1892). "The Storm of Maidstone by Fairfax 1648". The English Historical Review. 7 (27): 533–536. JSTOR 546517.
- Malden, Henry Elliot (1893). "Notes on the Family of Betoun in Connection with Some Royal Letters of James VI". Transactions of the Royal Historical Society. 7: 21–36. doi:10.2307/3678179. JSTOR 3678179.
- Malden, Henry Elliot (1896). "Shakespeare as an Historian". Transactions of the Royal Historical Society. 10: 23–40. doi:10.2307/3678202. JSTOR 3678202.
- Malden, H. E. (1911). "The Possession of Cardigan Priory by Chertsey Abbey: A Study in Some Mediæval Forgeries". Transactions of the Royal Historical Society. 5: 141–156. doi:10.2307/3678364. JSTOR 3678364.
- Malden, Henry Elliot (1916). "An Unedited Cely Letter of 1482". Transactions of the Royal Historical Society. 10: 159–165. doi:10.2307/3678341. JSTOR 3678341.
- Henry Elliot Malden, Ed., Magna Carta Commemoration Essays (1917), The Royal Historical Society.

=== Books ===
- Malden, Henry Elliot (1894). English Records: A Companion to the History of England.
- Malden, Henry Elliot (1900). A History of Surrey. Popular County Series.
- Malden, Henry Elliot, ed. (1900). The Cely Papers: Selections from the Correspondence and Memoranda of the Cely Family, Merchants of the Staple, A.D. 1475-1488.
- Malden, Henry Elliot (1902). Trinity Hall: Or, the College of Scholars of the Holy Trinity of Norwich, in the University of Cambridge.
- Malden, Henry Elliot, ed. (1912). The Victoria History of the County of Surrey.
