= Arthur Rawson Ashwell =

Arthur Rawson Ashwell (1824–1879) was a canon residentiary of Chichester and principal of the Theological College, Chichester.

== Biography ==
Ashwell was born at Cheyne Walk, Chelsea. In 1843 he entered Trinity College, Cambridge, but migrated to Caius College in 1845, being elected a foundation scholar there the following year. In 1847 he graduated BA as fifteenth wrangler, and in 1848 he received holy orders, and became curate of Speldhurst, Kent. In the following year he returned to Cambridge as curate of St. Mary the Less, in order that he might study theology under the direction of Professor Blunt.

In 1851 he was appointed vice-principal of St. Mark's College, Chelsea, and in 1853, partly through the instrumentality of Canon Butler of Wantage, he was appointed by Bishop Wilberforce principal of the newly founded Oxford Diocesan Training College at Culham. Here he remained for several years, and, besides his work in the college, assisted the bishop in organising a system of diocesan inspection.

In 1862 his health compelled him to retire to lighter work, and for two years he was minister of Holy Trinity Church, Conduit Street, Hanover Square; but in 1865 he returned to his old occupation, accepting the principalship of the Training College, Durham. The fame of his success at Durham led Bishop Durnford, an entire stranger to him, to offer him in 1870 the principalship of the Theological College, Chichester, with a canonry attached, and he also held for a short time the rectory of St. Martin's (1871–75), and that of St. Andrew's (1872-5), in that city. Canon Ashwell was active in literature.

In 1864 Ashwell became editor of the Literary Churchman, which office he held for twelve years, when he became (1876) editor of the Church Quarterly Review, and a little while before his death he also resumed the editorship of the Literary Churchman. To both these periodicals he was a regular contributor. He was also a contributor to the third series of Tracts for the Christian Seasons; and he wrote occasionally for the Quarterly Review and the Monthly Packet.

Ashwell was also in great request as a preacher in his own cathedral and elsewhere. He was, moreover, a frequent reader and speaker at church congresses, and an effective conductor of mission services. It is no wonder that his constitution was impaired by this excessive work, and that he succumbed to an attack of congestion of the lungs, which prematurely cut short a most active and useful life on 23 October 1879. A window and a lectern in Chichester Cathedral perpetuate his memory in a spot of which he had been a distinguished ornament.

Ashwell achieved reputation as a writer, a preacher, and a teacher. Some of his periodical essays excited much attention. His articles upon Dr. Farrar's Life of Christ in the second number of the Church Quarterly Review, and upon the State of the Church in the July number of the Quarterly Review, 1874, excited much interest. His article on Samuel Wilberforce in the April number, 1874, of the same Review was the main cause of his being asked to write the bishop's life; and several of his educational articles attracted unusual attention. His longest consecutive work was the first volume of the Life of Bishop Wilberforce (1880).

As a preacher Ashwell was extremely acceptable, especially among the more thoughtful and educated congregations. His little volume of printed sermons, entitled God in Nature, is full of striking and original ideas, expressed tersely and incisively, and evidently with a view to arrest or even force attention.

As a trainer, first of future schoolmasters, and then of future clergy, Ashwell made his influence deeply felt. His clear, epigrammatic style was the very style to command the attention of young men. He was a very strict disciplinarian, and the kindest of friends and counsellors to all pupils who sought his aid in confidence, as many of them have testified to the present writer. Canon Ashwell was a staunch and very definite English churchman. Besides the writings already mentioned, he published 'The Schoolmaster's Studies' (1860), 'The Argument against Evening Communions' (1875), 'Lectures on the Holy Catholic Church' (1876), and 'Septuagesima Lectures' (1877), all small works.

== Family ==
In 1854 Ashwell married Elizabeth Fixsen, of Blackheath, who survived him.
