= Michael Nazir-Ali =

British-Pakistani cleric (born 1949)

The Reverend Monsignor Michael Nazir-Ali
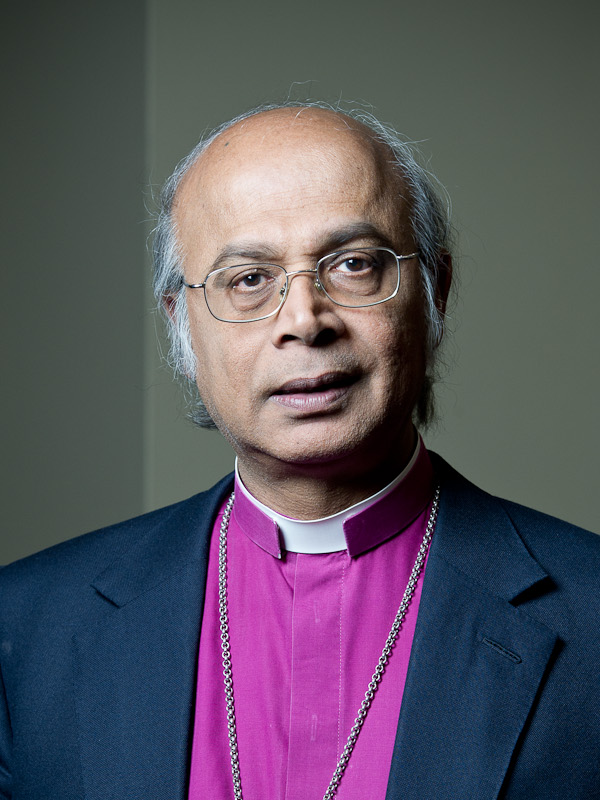
- Nazir-Ali in 2011
- Church: Catholic Church
- Diocese: Personal Ordinariate of Our Lady of Walsingham

Orders
- Ordination: 1976 (Anglican priest); 2021 (Roman Catholic priest)
- Consecration: 1984 (Anglican bishop)

Personal details
- Born: 19 August 1949 (age 77) Karachi, Federal Capital Territory, Dominion of Pakistan
- Denomination: Catholicism; Anglicanism (until 2021)
- Spouse: Valerie Cree (m. 1972)
- Children: 2

Member of the House of Lords
- Lord Spiritual
- Bishop of Rochester; 30 June 1999 – 31 August 2009

Michael James Nazir-Ali (Urdu: مائیکل نذیر علی; born 19 August 1949) is a Pakistani-born British Catholic priest and former Anglican bishop. He served as the 106th Bishop of Rochester from 1994 to 2009 and, before that, as Bishop of Raiwind in Pakistan. He is currently the director of the Oxford Centre for Training, Research, Advocacy and Dialogue.

In 2021, he was received into the Catholic Church and was ordained as a priest for the Ordinariate of Our Lady of Walsingham on 30 October 2021, one of several Anglican bishops who converted to Catholicism that year. In 2022, he was made a monsignor and Prelate of Honour of His Holiness to the Holy See. He is a dual citizen of Pakistan and Britain.

== Background ==
Michael Nazir-Ali was born in Karachi, Pakistan, on 19 August 1949, the son of James and Patience Nazir-Ali. He has both a Christian and a Muslim family background – his father's family are Sayyids. His father converted from Shia Islam. He attended the Roman Catholic-run St Paul's School and St Patrick's College in Karachi and attended Roman Catholic services there. He began identifying as a Christian at the age of 15; he was formally received into the Anglican Church of Pakistan aged 20.

== Academic career ==
Nazir-Ali attended St Paul's English High School, Karachi, and St Patrick's College and later studied economics, Islamic history and sociology at the University of Karachi (BA 1970). He studied in preparation for ordination at Ridley Hall, Cambridge (1972), and undertook postgraduate studies in theology at St Edmund Hall, Oxford (BLitt (Oxon, 1974), MLitt (Oxon, 1981), Hon. Fellow, 1999), Fitzwilliam College, Cambridge (MLitt (Cantab, 1976)) and the Australian College of Theology (ThD 1983).

He also studied at the Center for the Study of World Religions at Harvard Divinity School. In 2004 he was awarded an honorary doctor of letters degree by Westminster College, Pennsylvania, and in 2005 the Lambeth DD.

His particular academic interests include comparative literature and comparative philosophy of religion. He also has a number of honorary degrees.

In addition to teaching appointments in colleges and universities in many parts of the world, he has been a tutorial supervisor at the University of Cambridge, a senior tutor at Karachi Theological College and Visiting Professor of Theology and Religious Studies at the University of Greenwich. He has been elected an honorary fellow of his colleges at Oxford (St Edmund Hall) and Cambridge (Fitzwilliam). From 1986 until 1989, while he was assistant to the Archbishop of Canterbury and Co-ordinator of Studies and Education for the Lambeth Conference, he was an honorary curate of St Giles' Church, and St Margaret's Church, both in Oxford. In 2010, he was appointed as a senior fellow of Wycliffe Hall and is on the faculty of the London School of Theology, the Lahore College of Theology, the Alexandria School of Theology and the Oxford Centre for Mission Studies (OCMS). He has been invited to lecture as Professor of Theology, at the University of St Thomas or the Angelicum in Rome from 2022.

He understands English, Arabic, Persian, Punjabi, Urdu, Hindi, Greek, Hebrew, Aramaic, Syriac, and Latin.

== Ordained ministry and public career ==
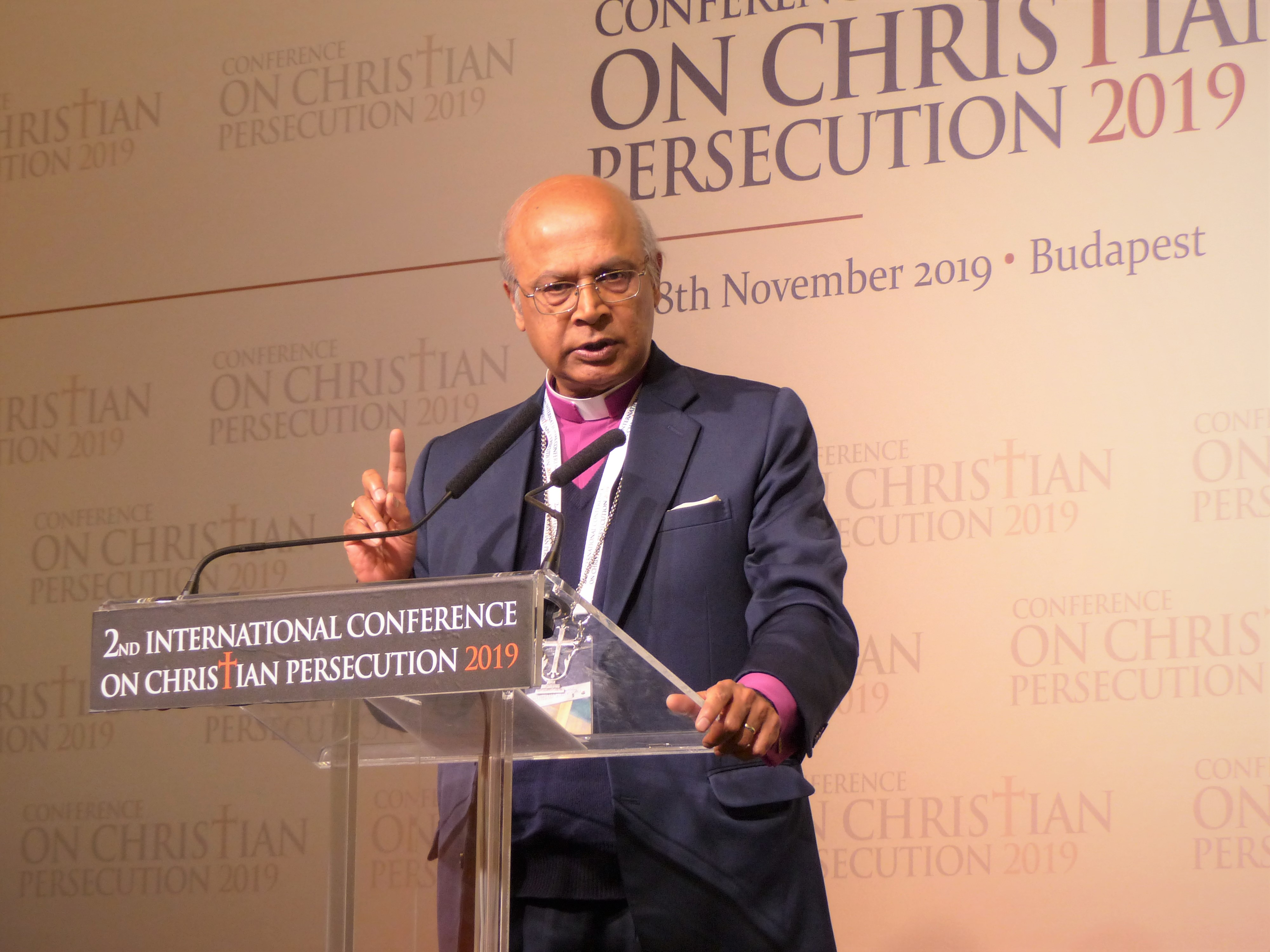
Nazir-Ali in Central Europe

Nazir-Ali was ordained as an Anglican priest in 1976 in the Church of Pakistan and worked in Karachi and Lahore. He became the first Bishop of Raiwind in West Punjab (1984–86), at the time he was the youngest bishop in the Anglican Communion. When his life was endangered in Pakistan in 1986, Robert Runcie, then the Archbishop of Canterbury, arranged for his refuge in England. Nazir-Ali said, "the reason behind some of the difficulties I was facing was removed when General Zia was killed – unfortunately for him, and I am now not doing the work that I was doing at the time with the very poor". He became an assistant to the Archbishop of Canterbury at Lambeth and assisted with the planning of the 1988 Lambeth Conference; he was general secretary of the Church Mission Society 1989–1994 and concurrently an assistant bishop in the Diocese of Southwark.

Nazir-Ali was appointed Bishop of Rochester, England, in 1994 and, in 1999, entered the House of Lords as one of the Lords Spiritual because of his seniority in episcopal office, the first religious leader from Asia to serve there. He was one of the final two candidates for Archbishop of Canterbury, though Rowan Williams was appointed on the recommendation of the British prime minister, Tony Blair.

From 1997 to 2003, Nazir-Ali was chairman of the Human Fertilisation and Embryology Authority's ethics and law committee. He was a leader of the Network for Inter-faith Concerns of the Anglican Communion. and led the dialogue with Al-Azhar. He is also a founding member of the Dialogue of Scholars founded after the 9/11 attacks. For many years, he served as a member of the Anglican–Roman Catholic International Commission (ARCIC) and, more latterly, of the International Anglican–Roman Catholic Commission for Unity and Mission (IARCCUM).

From 2010, Nazir-Ali was the visiting bishop of the Anglican Diocese of South Carolina in the United States. The diocese was part of the Episcopal Church in the United States but left it to join the Anglican Church in North America which is not a church in the Anglican Communion but is widely recognised by Anglican churches in Africa, Asia and Latin America (the Global South).

=== Ordination in the Roman Catholic Church ===
On 29 September 2021, Nazir-Ali was received into the Catholic Church by the ordinary of the Personal Ordinariate of Our Lady of Walsingham, Monsignor Keith Newton. He was ordained as a deacon by Archbishop Kevin McDonald on 28 October 2021 at St Mary's College, Oscott, and a priest by Cardinal Vincent Nichols on 30 October 2021 at Our Lady of the Assumption and St Gregory Catholic Church in London. On 6 April 2022, Pope Francis granted Nazir-Ali the title of Prelate of Honour of His Holiness.

== Views ==
Nazir-Ali was generally regarded as being on the Evangelical wing of Anglicanism but described himself as being "Catholic and evangelical". He is familiar with a number of Middle Eastern, Asian and European languages and has played a significant role in the Church of England's ecumenical and interfaith dialogues.

=== Ordination of women ===
At first Nazir-Ali supported the ordination of women as priests in the Church of England. He chaired the Rochester Commission on whether women should be made bishops. Because of his work there, he now believes that the Anglican Communion should not have made a unilateral change in its ordained ministry, which it believes it shares with the Catholic and Orthodox churches.

=== Medical ethics ===
Nazir-Ali has written and spoken on a number of bioethical issues including in vitro fertilisation, stem cell research, organ donation and assisted dying. Here he has generally supported the "culture of life" and warned against a "culture of death". He has argued that human dignity is based on "transcendental values" and must be respected at all stages of human development, even when we are not sure whether there is a person, on the basis of the precautionary principle. He is anti-abortion and opposes euthanasia. He attended the March for Life, the first to ever take place in London, on 5 May 2018, where he delivered the closing prayer and had rubbish thrown all over him by a protester.

=== Marriage and family ===
In 2000, Nazir-Ali wrote,

It is very important for the Church to continue saying that having children and their nurture is a basic good of marriage and not an optional extra. Just as a marriage is not complete without mutual support, companionship and love, so there is a real lack if the intention is never to have children, regardless of circumstances. This signals that marriage is not a matter of self-indulgence. In our age, such teaching is crucial."

In his statement, he had gone on to say when it was right for couples not to have children. Clergy and counsellors would need to advise couples in such circumstances as to what was right for them.

Because of this statement, it has been claimed that Nazir-Ali believed that married couples have a duty to have children and that those who remained childless were "self-indulgent". Although he views having children a basic part of a good marriage, he has denied ever labelling couples who did not have children "self-indulgent", claiming it was "pure invention".

In 2014, he spoke at the Humanum interreligious colloquium on marriage and the family held at the Vatican. His views on marriage as contract, commitment and sacrament were published in Standpoint magazine in May 2012.

In late September 2017, Nazir-Ali spoke at the UK Independence Party conference in Torquay. In his speech, he described the 1960s as having seen "a sudden death for Christian discourse in public life" in Britain. In his opinion, "the Christian faith stopped being of importance in this country when the women stopped passing it on in the home. It was not the church, it was not the school, it was the mothers who passed the faith on". While he said that he was not calling "return to the past", he advocated UKIP should "promote policies for the wellbeing of the family and the nurture of children in the family". He has also spoken at the Conservative and Labour Party Conferences on a variety of issues, including the family and social Justice.

=== Human sexuality ===
Because of his beliefs on marriage and the family, Nazir-Ali has not been in favour of the ordination of non-sexually abstinent homosexual people as clergy and the blessing of same-sex unions. He was one of the bishops who signed a letter against Rowan Williams' decision not to block the appointment of Jeffrey John as Bishop of Reading in 2003.

In October 2007, he told The Daily Telegraph that he would not attend the 2008 Lambeth Conference because he would find it "very difficult" to be in council with the bishops of the Episcopal Church in the United States following the actions of that church in ordaining Gene Robinson, a divorced priest in an active homosexual relationship, to the office of bishop, which he believed was against Anglican teaching and damaging the unity of the Anglican Communion. In doing this, he was joined by nearly 300 other bishops.

He was "accused of pandering to hate and homophobia" by activists after the media published a statement on the day a gay pride parade took place in London and before a major Anglican event at which he was preaching, claiming he had called on homosexuals to "repent and be changed".

After he was reported in the press as saying homosexuals should "repent and be changed", he made further comments in which he clarified his remarks. He stated, when asked, that he had initially said to the journalist from The Telegraph that he was going to say in his sermon that all people, particularly churches and Christians, should repent, because there was a need "to refocus on the faith of the church from down the ages and an authentic mission to the nations." When asked specifically about whether this included homosexuals, he had reiterated it included everybody and cited his interpretation of the Christian view of human sexuality, marriage and the family.

=== Church in the public square ===
In 2014, he stated that many Anglicans and other Christians looked to the Catholic Church to lead in the protection of Christians from persecution by extremist Islamists in countries such as Iraq and Syria.

=== Multiculturalism ===
In the launch edition of Standpoint magazine, Nazir-Ali called for Christianity to regain a prominent position in public life and blamed the "newfangled and insecurely founded doctrine of multiculturalism" for entrenching the segregation of communities. Nazir-Ali argued that the decline of Christianity and the rise of liberal values in the UK during the 1960s had created a moral vacuum which radical Islam threatened to fill. He wrote that "We have argued that it is necessary to understand where we have come from, to guide us to where we are going, and to bring us back when we wander too far from the path of national destiny." The Guardian newspaper devoted its leader to criticising Nazir-Ali, although it described his writing as "neatly underlining [Standpoint]'s expressed intent 'to defend and celebrate Western civilisation'". Nazir-Ali was criticised by the Ramadhan foundation and the President of the National Secular Society, who accused him of "doing the BNP’s work", but was praised by The Daily Telegraph newspaper. Nazir-Ali has himself written against Christian involvement in far-right organisations such as the British National Party.

He has said, "The Church must change its approach. It must not capitulate to culture nor must it destroy any culture. Instead it must take heed of Pope Benedict's point: that the role of the Church is to enable culture to find its true centre".

=== Relations with Muslims ===
Nazir-Ali has become a spokesman for an engagement between Christianity and Islam and has been involved in a number of notable dialogues between Muslims and others. He has led the church's dialogue with Al-Azhar As-Sharif, a prominent place of Sunni learning, and also with Shi'a Ulema in Iran. In November 2006 Nazir-Ali criticised the "dual psychology" of some extremist Muslims who seek both "victimhood and domination". He said it would never be possible to satisfy all of the demands made by them because "their complaint often boils down to the position that it is always right to intervene when Muslims are victims ... and always wrong when Muslims are the oppressors or terrorists. Given the world view that has given rise to such grievances, there can never be sufficient appeasement and new demands will continue to be made." In response, the Muslim Council of Britain said "We would normally expect a bishop to display more humility and work towards bringing communities closer together rather than contributing towards fostering greater divisions."

==== "No-go areas" ====
In January 2008, Nazir-Ali wrote that Islamic extremism had turned "already separate communities into "no-go areas" and that there had been attempts to "impose an 'Islamic' character on certain areas", citing the call to prayer from mosques as an example, and the pressure on people to conform to Islamist norms in dress, conduct, and speech. He criticised the government's integration policy as "an agenda which still lacks the underpinning of a moral and spiritual vision", and asked that the government make a public affirmation of the "Christian roots of British society".

These comments resulted in some debate and criticism, including a response from the Muslim Council of Britain, which said the mosque call was no different from church bells ringing. Nick Clegg, leader of the Liberal Democrats, described the comments as "a gross caricature of reality". Conservative Party home affairs spokesman David Davis said, however, that the bishop had rightly drawn attention to a "deeply serious problem" and that Labour's support for multiculturalism risked creating a situation of "voluntary apartheid".

The Secretary of State for Communities and Local Government, Hazel Blears, responded to Nazir-Ali's comments by stating that Britain was a "secular democracy", and challenged him to name specific "no go" areas. Nazir-Ali subsequently received threatening phone calls, but said his "overflowing postbag" had been "overwhelmingly supportive."

==== Burka ban ====
In 2018, Nazir-Ali wrote that he was not in favour of banning a face veil but that in certain circumstances, such as security at airports, road safety and professions requiring personal interaction, it should not be worn.

=== Anglican realignment ===
Nazir-Ali was a supporter of the Anglican realignment movement and the Global Anglican Future Conference (GAFCON). He attended and spoke at the first and second GAFCON gatherings as well as GAFCON III which took place in Jerusalem from 17 to 22 June 2018. He also attended G19, the additional conference that took place in Dubai from 25 February to 1 March 2019. He was also one of the founders of the Mere Anglicanism annual conferences in the US and has been a supporter of the Global South.

== Private life and honours ==
Nazir-Ali met his wife, Valerie Cree, who is Scottish, in Cambridge. They were married in 1972 and have two adult sons, Shamaoun ("Shammy") and Ross. His pastimes have included hockey, cricket, table tennis and Scrabble as well as writing poetry in English and Persian and listening to music. In 2003, he was awarded an honorary Doctor of Letters degree from the University of Bath; he also has honorary doctorates from the universities of Kent and Greenwich and others in the United States. He has been awarded the Shaikh Yamani Gold Medal in Islamic Studies and the Paul Harris International Fellowship by Rotary.

== Publications ==
Nazir-Ali's published writings include the following:

- Islam: A Christian Perspective (1983)
- Frontiers in Christian-Muslim Encounters (1987)
- From Everywhere to Everywhere: A World View of Christian Mission (1990)
- Thinking globally, acting locally (1992)
- Mission and Dialogue: Proclaiming the Gospel Afresh in Every Age (1995)
- The Mystery of Faith (1995)
- Citizens and Exiles: Christian Faith in a Plural World (2000)
- Shapes of the Church to Come (2001)
- Understanding My Muslim Neighbour (2003)
- Conviction And Conflict: Islam, Christianity And World Order (2005)
- The Unique and Universal Christ (2008)
- Triple Jeopardy for the West (2012)
- Faith, Freedom and the Future (2016)
- The Mission & Ministry of the Church in England (2023)

He has also published a number of monographs and many other articles in newspapers and journals.

== See also ==
- List of British Pakistanis
- List of Anglican Bishops who converted to Roman Catholicism
- List of Catholic converts
- List of Catholic priests

Church of England titles
Preceded by Michael Turnbull	Bishop of Rochester; 1994–2009	Succeeded by James Langstaff
