= Guy Sanderson =

English Anglican bishop

Wilfrid Guy Sanderson (17 August 1905 – 22 July 1988) was an English Anglican Bishop of Plymouth from 1962 to 1972.

He was born on 17 August 1905 and educated at Malvern and Merton College, Oxford. After ordination he was a curate at Farnborough, Hampshire and then priest in charge of St Aidan's Aldershot. After this he had incumbencies at Woodham, Surrey, Alton, Hampshire, Silverton, Devon and finally (before his ordination to the episcopate) Barnstaple where he was also archdeacon of the region. He was consecrated a bishop on 30 November 1962 by Michael Ramsey, Archbishop of Canterbury, at Southwark Cathedral.

He married Cecily Julia Mary Garrat in 1934; they had a son, also called Wilfrid, and two daughters, Gillian and Sally.

Church of England titles
Preceded by Norman Clarke	Bishop of Plymouth; 1962–1972	Succeeded by Richard Cartwright
