= John Garton (bishop) =

British Anglican bishop and theologian

The Right Reverend John Garton
- Bishop of Plymouth
- Church: Church of England
- Diocese: Diocese of Exeter
- In office: 1996 to 2005
- Predecessor: Richard Hawkins
- Successor: John Ford
- Other post: Honorary assistant bishop in Oxford (2006–2016)

Orders
- Ordination: 1969
- Consecration: 3 July 1996

Personal details
- Born: 3 October 1941
- Died: 21 July 2016 (aged 74)
- Denomination: Anglican
- Parents: Henry & Dorothy
- Spouse: Pauline George (m. 1969; died 2006)
- Children: 2 sons
- Profession: Academic (theologian)
- Education: Worcester College, Oxford

John Henry Garton (3 October 1941 – 21 July 2016) was a British Anglican bishop and theologian. He was the Principal of Ripon College Cuddesdon from 1986 to 1996, and the suffragan Bishop of Plymouth in the Church of England from 1996 to 2005.

== Early life and education ==
Garton was born on 3 October 1941. He was educated at Worcester College, Oxford and Ripon College Cuddesdon. He completed a short service commission in the Royal Tank Regiment.

== Ordained ministry ==
He was ordained in 1969 and began his career as a Chaplain to the Forces. From 1973 until 1976 he was a lecturer at Lincoln Theological College and then Rector of St Peter's Hillfields. He then spent 10 years as Principal of Ripon College Cuddesdon before his ordination to the episcopate as the Bishop of Plymouth, a position he held from 1996 until his retirement in 2005 after which he was appointed an honorary assistant bishop in the Diocese of Oxford.

He died on 21 July 2016 at the age of 74.

Church of England titles
Preceded by Richard Hawkins	Bishop of Plymouth; 1996–2005	Succeeded by John Ford
