= John Ford (bishop) =

British former Anglican bishop

- Bishop of The Murray
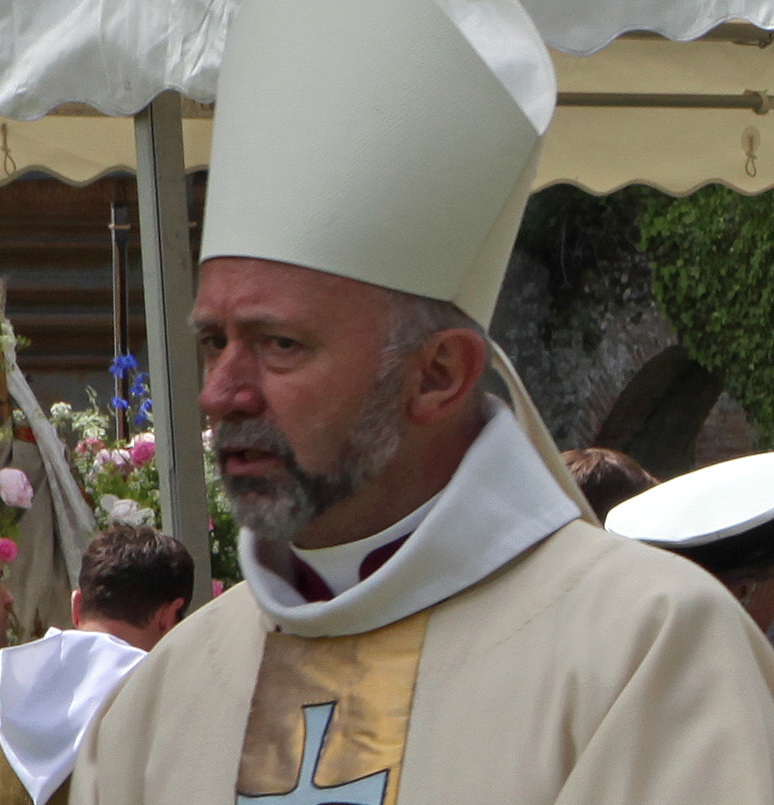
- Ford in 2012
- Church: Anglican Church of Australia
- Diocese: The Murray
- Predecessor: Ross Davies
- Other posts: Bishop of Plymouth, UK (2005-2013)

Orders
- Ordination: 1980
- Consecration: 13 December 2005 by Rowan Williams

Personal details
- Born: 14 January 1952 (age 74)
- Denomination: Roman Catholic (formerly Anglican)
- Spouse: Bridget
- Children: 3
- Education: Southampton College of Technology

John Frank Ford (born 14 January 1952) is a British former Anglican bishop. From 2013 to 2019 he was the Bishop of The Murray in the Anglican Church of Australia. From 2005 to 2013, he was the Bishop of Plymouth, a suffragan bishopric in the Diocese of Exeter in the Church of England. In November 2025 he was received into the Roman Catholic Church.

== Early life ==
Ford was educated at the Southampton College of Technology. From 1976 to 1979, he studied for ordination at Chichester Theological College.

== Ordained ministry ==
Ford was ordained in the Church of England as a deacon in 1979 and as a priest in 1980. He began his career with a curacy at Christ Church, Forest Hill after which he was vicar of St Augustine's Lee and then domestic chaplain to the Bishop of Horsham. From 1994 to 2000, he was a diocesan missioner for the Diocese of Chichester. From 2000 to 2005, he was a residentiary canon and precentor of Chichester Cathedral.

=== Episcopal ministry ===
On 13 December 2005, Ford was consecrated as a bishop at Exeter Cathedral by Rowan Williams, the then Archbishop of Canterbury. He was Bishop of Plymouth, a suffragan bishop in the Diocese of Exeter, from 2005 to 2013. From 2011 to 2013, he also held the position of assistant bishop in the Diocese of Truro.

On 30 June 2013, Ford was announced as the next diocesan bishop of the Diocese of The Murray in South Australia. He was installed as the fourth Bishop of The Murray on 6 December 2013. He retired in 2019 and returned to England to live in the Diocese of Chichester. He had permission to officiate in the Diocese in Europe.

Ford was a member of The Society, an association of traditionalist Anglo-Catholics in the Church of England who reject on theological grounds the ordination of women as priests and bishops.

== Roman Catholic Church ==
On 30 November 2025, the First Sunday of Advent, Ford was received into the Roman Catholic Church.

== Personal life ==
Ford is a keen cricket fan. He is married to Bridget. They have three children.

== Styles ==
- The Reverend John Ford (1980–1997)
- The Reverend Canon John Ford (1997–2005)
- The Right Reverend John Ford (2005–2025)
- Mr John Ford (2025–present)

Church of England titles
Preceded by John Garton	Bishop of Plymouth; 2005–2013	Succeeded by Nick McKinnel
Anglican Communion titles
Preceded by Ross Davies	Bishop of The Murray; 2013–2019	Succeeded by Keith Dalby
