= Peter Watterson =

American Catholic priest (1927–1996)

Peter Francis Watterson (August 16, 1927, Swarthmore, Pennsylvania – September 12, 1996) was an American Catholic priest who had formerly been a bishop of the Continuing Anglican movement.

== Early life and education ==
Watterson was the son of Peter Francis Watterson and his wife Louise Mohr Watterson. He attended Bard College from which he graduated in 1952 with a Bachelor of Science degree.

Watterson received his theological education from Philadelphia Divinity School from which he received a Bachelor of Sacred Theology degree in 1955 and a Master of Sacred Theology degree in 1957.

== Anglican ministry ==
Watterson was ordained a deacon in the Episcopal Church in May 1955 and a priest in November 1955. From 1955 to 1957 he was assistant at St. John's Church in Norristown, Pennsylvania. From 1957 to 1958 he was Vicar of Redeemer Parish in Avon Park, Florida. From 1960 to 1977 he was Rector of Holy Spirit Parish in West Palm Beach, Florida. In the 1970s Watterson was active in the organization Episcopalians for a Right to Life, a predecessor to Anglicans for Life.

In mid-September 1977 Watterson attended the Congress of St. Louis, a gathering of Episcopalians who were opposed to certain changes in the Episcopal Church. Two weeks later, on October 2, Watterson's parish voted to separate from the Episcopal Church. On December 16, 1977, the Diocese of the Southeast United States was organized and Watterson was elected its first bishop.

On January 28, 1978, Watterson and three other former Episcopalian priests were consecrated bishops for a newly forming body to be called the Anglican Church in North America. Albert Chambers, Retired Bishop of Springfield, and Francisco Pagtakhan, a bishop of the Philippine Independent Church consecrated Charles D. D. Doren (with a letter of consent from Bishop Mark Pae of the Anglican Church of Korea). Then Doren joined Chambers and Pagtakhan in consecrating Watterson together with Robert S. Morse and James O. Mote.

In August 1978 the 11th Lambeth Conference of Anglican bishops was held in Canterbury. Although not formally invited, Watterson did appear at the conference on one day.

In October 1978 an assembly of the Anglican Church in North America met in Dallas, Texas, to discuss a proposed constitution. The assembly faced a disagreement over issues of church government, particularly the authority of bishops. Doren and Mote remained in the Anglican Church in North America (later renamed the Anglican Catholic Church). Although Watterson originally voted with Doren and Mote, he eventually joined with Morse to form a separate body. In 1979 Watterson and Morse's dioceses held a convention at Hot Springs, Arkansas, to form a body known as the Anglican Church in America, but the union did not last long. Watterson and Morse remained the heads of independent dioceses; Morse's church continues under the name Anglican Province of Christ the King.

== Reception into the Catholic Church ==
In 1984 Watterson resigned as bishop of the Diocese of the Southeastern United States. He was received into full communion with the Catholic Church. In August 1987 he was ordained a Catholic priest for the Diocese of Palm Beach in accordance with the Pastoral Provision for former Episcopalians.

== Personal life ==
Watterson was married with three children. He died in 1996.
