= Tony Wilds (priest) =

English Anglican priest

The Ven. Anthony Ronald Wilds (born 4 October 1943), known as Tony Wilds, is an English Anglican priest. He was Archdeacon of Plymouth from 2001 until 2010.

Wilds was educated at Durham University and Bishops' College, Cheshunt; he was ordained deacon in 1966, and priest in 1967.

After a curacy at Newport Pagnell, Wilds was priest-in-charge of Chipili from 1972 to 1975. He subsequently served as vicar of Chandlers Ford from 1975 to 1985 and of Andover from 1985 to 1997. He was rector of Solihull before succeeding Robin Ellis as Archdeacon of Plymouth in 2001. After retiring as archdeacon in 2010 he served as priest-in-charge of Marnhull.

Church of England titles
Preceded by Robin Gareth Ellis	Archdeacon of Plymouth; 2001–2010	Succeeded by Ian Nigel Chandler
