= Henry Browne (scholar) =

English classical and biblical scholar

Henry Browne (1804–1875) was an English classical and biblical scholar.

== Early years ==
Browne was the son of the Rev. Henry John Browne, rector of Crownthorpe, Norfolk. He was educated at Corpus Christi College, Cambridge, where he was Bell Scholar in 1823. He graduated B.A. in 1826, and M.A. in 1830.

== Career ==
From 1842 to 1847 he was principal of the theological college, Chichester. On 9 December 1842 he was collated to the prebendal stall of Waltham in Chichester Cathedral, and in 1843 he was appointed examining chaplain to the bishop of Chichester. In 1854 he was preferred to the parish of Pevensey in the same diocese. Here he remained until his death, 19 June 1875.

== Publications ==
Besides editions and translations of the classics, Browne applied himself chiefly to the elucidation of sacred chronology. His published works are:

- Ordo Sæculorum (1844), a treatise on the chronology of Holy Scripture.' The argument is mainly on the same lines as Henry Fynes Clinton's. Contemporary knowledge of oriental archæology is brought to bear on biblical statements.
- Examination of the Ancient Egyptian Chronographies, begun in 1852 in Thomas Kerchever Arnold's Theological Critic.
- Remarks on Mr. Greswell's "Fasti Catholici" (1852). Negative criticism of the conclusions of Edward Greswell.
- He translated for the Library of the Fathers seventeen short treatises of Augustine of Hippo with Charles Lewis Cornish, and also Augustine's Homilies on the Gospel and First Epistle of St. John (from 1838).
- Several volumes of Greek and Latin classics for Arnold's School and College Series (from 1851).
- A translation of Johan Nicolai Madvig's Greek Syntax (1847).
- A Handbook of Hebrew Antiquities (1851).
- An English-Greek Lexicon, with Rädersdorf (1856).
- Hierogrammata (1848). The aim is to show that Egyptian discoveries do not invalidate the Mosaic account.
- He was also the author of several articles in the final edition (1862–66) of John Kitto's Cyclopædia of Biblical Literature.
- Triglot Dictionary of Scriptural Representative Words in Hebrew, Greek, and English by Henry Browne
