= Arthur Masterman =

English zoologist and author (1869–1941)

Arthur Masterman FRS FRSE

Superintending Inspector & Director of Fishery Investigations, Board of Agriculture and Fisheries
- In office 1903–1920

Personal details
- Born: Arthur Thomas Masterman; 9 April 1869
- Died: 10 February 1941 (aged 71)
- Occupation: Zoologist

Arthur Thomas Masterman (9 April 1869 – 10 February 1941) was an English zoologist and author. He was an expert on the British fishing industry.

== Life ==
He was born on 9 April 1869 the son of Thomas W. Masterman of Rotherfield Hall in Sussex. His older brother Howard Masterman, became Bishop of Plymouth. His youngest brother was Charles Masterman. Masterman was educated at University School in Hastings and then Weymouth College. He then won a scholarship to Christ's College, Cambridge studying under Sir Arthur Shipley. He graduated in physiology and zoology in 1893.

After graduating he obtained a post assisting at the University of St Andrews and in 1900 became a lecturer in natural history. He began specialising in food fish and oversaw the interpretation of the fishing research vessel "S. S. Garland". He helped to establish the Gatty Marine Laboratory with his senior colleague, William Carmichael McIntosh. In 1900 he also became an extramural lecturer at the University of Edinburgh on embryology. In 1903 he returned to England as Superintendent Inspector of Fisheries to the Ministry of Agriculture and Fisheries.

In 1898 he was elected a Fellow of the Royal Society of Edinburgh. His proposers were William Carmichael McIntosh, Sir John Murray, Sir William Turner and Alexander Crum Brown. He won the Society's Makdougall-Brisbane prize for 1900–02. He became a Fellow of the Royal Society of London in 1915.

In 1917 he was seconded to the Air Ministry.

He retired due to ill-health in 1920 and died on 10 February 1941.

== Publications ==
- The Life Histories of the British Marine Food Fish
- Elementary Textbook of Zoology (1901)
- Report on the Epidemic amongst Salmonidae in the Summer of 1911 (1912)
