= St John the Baptist Cathedral, Murray Bridge =

St John the Baptist Cathedral
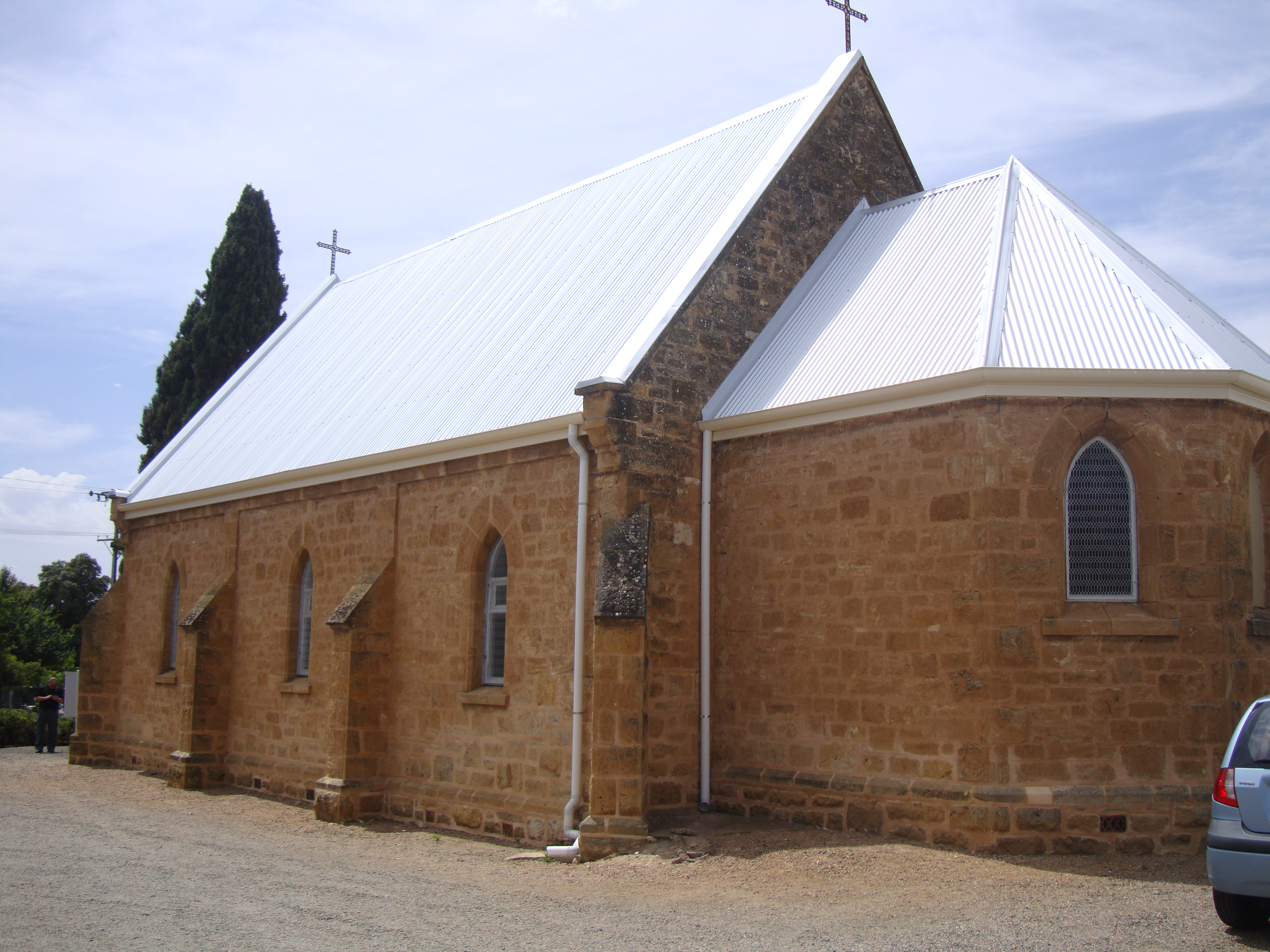
- St John's Cathedral
- St John the Baptist Cathedral
- 35°07′10″S 139°16′22″E
- Location: Murray Bridge
- Country: Australia
- Denomination: Anglican Church of Australia

History
- Consecrated: 4 February 1887

Architecture
- Completed: 1887
- Construction cost: 434 pounds, 10 shillings

Specifications
- Capacity: 130
- Length: 20 metres (66 ft)
- Width: 8 metres (26 ft)

Administration
- Province: Province of South Australia
- Diocese: Diocese of The Murray

Clergy
- Bishop: Vacant
- Rector: David Price

St John the Baptist Cathedral, Murray Bridge is the cathedral church of the Anglican Diocese of The Murray, South Australia.

The cathedral building was built in 1887 of rough stone as a Missions church but was upgraded to a Parish church in 1948 and, with a maximum seating capacity of 130, is the smallest cathedral in Australia.

The interior of the cathedral is decorated in the High Church tradition.

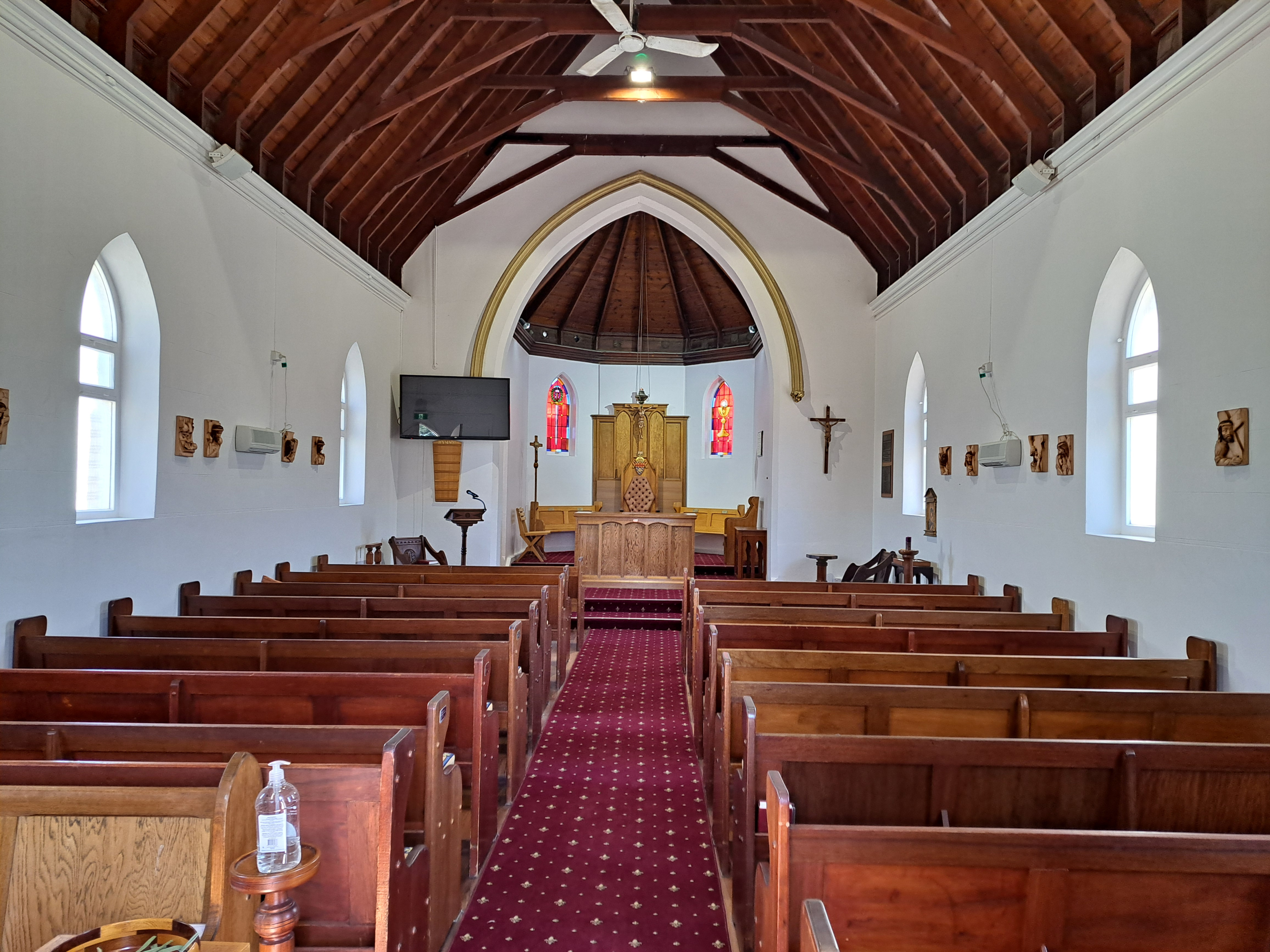
Inside the Cathedral Church of St. John the Baptist.

== See also ==
- Church of Holy Cross, Nin Croatia
- Cathedral of The Isles Scotland
