= Anglican Archbishop of Adelaide =

Archbishop of Adelaide
- Archbishopric

anglican
- Coat of arms of the Diocese
- Incumbent: Brad Billings since 7 March 2026
- Style: The Most Reverend

Location
- Country: Australia
- Ecclesiastical province: South Australia
- Residence: Adelaide

Information
- First holder: Augustus Short
- Denomination: Anglicanism
- Established: Bishopric on 25 June 1847; Archbishopric in 1970
- Diocese: Adelaide
- Cathedral: St Peter's Cathedral, Adelaide

Website
- Diocese of Adelaide

The Archbishop of Adelaide is the diocesan bishop of the Anglican Diocese of Adelaide, Australia and ex officio metropolitan bishop of the ecclesiastical Province of South Australia.

== List of Bishops and Archbishops of Adelaide ==
Bishops of Adelaide
No	From	Until	Incumbent	Notes
1	1847	1882	Augustus Short	
2	1882	1894	George Kennion	Translated to Bath and Wells.
3	1895	1905	John Harmer	Translated to Rochester.
4	1906	1940	A. Nutter Thomas	
5	1941	1956	Bryan Robin	Formerly Archdeacon of Hampstead.
6	1957	1970	Tom Reed	Became Archbishop of Adelaide in 1970.
Archbishops of Adelaide
No	From	Until	Incumbent	Notes
(6)	1970	1975	Tom Reed	Bishop of Adelaide until 1970.
7	1976	1989	Keith Rayner	Translated from Wangaratta; translated to Melbourne.
8	1991	2004	Ian George	Previously assistant bishop in Canberra and Goulburn.
9	2005	2016	Jeffrey Driver	Translated from Gippsland
10	2017	2025	Geoffrey Smith	Primate of Australia from 2020 to 2025. Previously assistant bishop, General Manager, and Registrar of the Anglican Diocese of Brisbane (2007–2017)
11	7 March 2026		Brad Billings	Previously an assistant bishop in Melbourne
