= Norman Clarke (bishop) =

British Anglican bishop

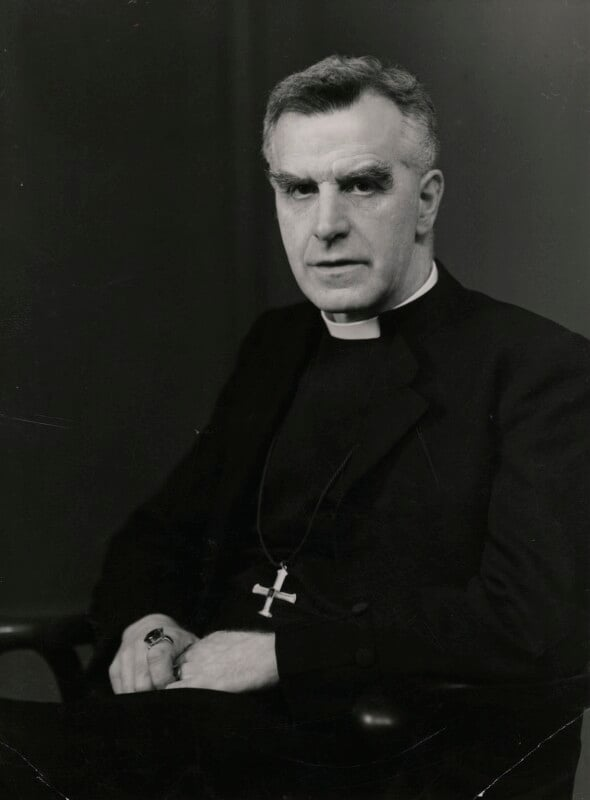
Clarke in 1951

Norman Harry Clarke (31 July 1892 – 18 February 1974) was a British Anglican bishop who served as the third Bishop of Plymouth from 1950 to 1962 and, simultaneously, as the Archdeacon of Plymouth.

Clarke was born in Sheffield and educated at Sheffield University. He was made deacon on Trinity Sunday 1916 (18 June) and ordained priest the next Trinity Sunday (3 June 1917) — both times by Leonard Burrows, Bishop of Sheffield, at Sheffield Cathedral. He was a Diocesan Inspector of Schools, then a residential canon at Southwark Cathedral and finally (before his ordination to the episcopate) Vicar of St Andrew's, Plymouth. He was consecrated a bishop on St James's Day 1950 (25 July) by Geoffrey Fisher, Archbishop of Canterbury, at St Paul's Cathedral.

Church of England titles
Preceded by Whitfield Daukes	Bishop of Plymouth; 1950 – 1962	Succeeded by Guy Sanderson
