= Kenneth Newing =

Anglican bishop (1923–2019)

The Rt Revd Dom Kenneth Newing MA(Cantab) OSB
- Bishop of Plymouth
- Diocese: Diocese of Exeter
- In office: 1982–1988
- Predecessor: Richard Cartwright
- Successor: Richard Hawkins
- Other post: Archdeacon of Plymouth (1978–1982)

Orders
- Ordination: 1955 (deacon); 1956 (priest)
- Consecration: 1982

Personal details
- Born: 29 August 1923
- Died: 15 May 2019 (aged 95)
- Denomination: Anglican
- Residence: Salisbury Priory, Wiltshire
- Parents: Albert & Nellie
- Profession: Monk
- Education: Selwyn College, Cambridge

Kenneth Albert Newing OSB (29 August 1923 – 15 May 2019) was the Anglican Bishop of Plymouth from 1982 to 1988.

Newing was educated at Dover Grammar School for Boys and Selwyn College, Cambridge. After a period of study at The College of the Resurrection, Mirfield, he was made a deacon at Michaelmas 1955 (2 October), by Robert Mortimer, Bishop of Exeter, at Exeter Cathedral, ordained priest in 1956, and began his career with a curacy at Plymstock followed by a long period as Rector of Plympton St Maurice. In 1978 he became the Archdeacon of Plymouth and four years later Bishop suffragan of Plymouth. He was consecrated a bishop on 2 February 1982, by Robert Runcie, Archbishop of Canterbury, at Westminster Abbey. On resigning from the episcopate he joined the Anglican Benedictine community at Elmore Abbey (now based in Salisbury). Newing died in May 2019 at the age of 95.

Church of England titles
Preceded by Richard Cartwright	Bishop of Plymouth; 1982–1988	Succeeded by Richard Hawkins
