= St Barnabas College (Adelaide) =

Theological college in South Australia

Coordinates: 34°54′46″S 138°35′56″E

St Barnabas College is an Australian theological school in North Adelaide, South Australia, affiliated with the Anglican Church of Australia.

The institution was formally associated with the ecumenical consortium, the Adelaide College of Divinity (ACD).

In 2010, the ACD consortium dissolved, and St Barnabas' College partnered with Charles Sturt University through an affiliation with St Mark's National Theological Centre in Canberra.

St Barnabas College became an affiliated College of the University of Divinity in 2022.
