= Whitfield Daukes =

Francis Whitfield Daukes (27 March 1877 – 30 July 1954) was a Church of England bishop.

Daukes was born into a clerical family as the eldest son of the Reverend Samuel Whitfield Daukes, sometime Vicar of Holy Trinity, Beckenham. His grandfather was architect Samuel Daukes. He was educated at Harrow and Oriel College, Oxford. He studied for ordination at Wycliffe Hall, Oxford and his first appointment was as a Curate at South Lambeth. From 1905 until 1914 he was Vicar of St Saviour, Denmark Park. After this he was Rural Dean of Greenwich and then of the Three Towns before being appointed Archdeacon of Plymouth. From 1934 until 1950 he was the second Bishop of the area. A man with the "clearest sense of fairness", he died on 30 July 1954.

== Notes ==
Church of England titles
Preceded by John Howard Bertram Masterman	Bishop of Plymouth (Anglican); 1934–1950	Succeeded by Norman Harry Clarke
