= The Most Reverend =

Religious honorific style

The Most Reverend (abbreviated as The Most Revd or The Most Rev) is an honorific style given to certain (primarily Western) Christian clergy and ministers. It is a variant of the more common style "The Reverend".

== Catholic ==
In the Catholic Church, two different systems may be found. In most countries, all bishops are styled "The Most Reverend", as well as monsignors of the rank of protonotary apostolic de numero. In the United Kingdom, only archbishops bear the style "The Most Reverend", with other bishops styled "The Right Reverend".

By custom, this title is used for the ministers general of the various branches of the Order of Friars Minor as well as of the Third Order Regular of St. Francis.

== Eastern Orthodox ==
In the Eastern Orthodox tradition, archbishops under the Ecumenical Patriarchate (those who are not the primates of autocephalous churches) and metropolitans are styled "His Eminence, The Most Reverend" in English. Other bishops are styled "The Right Reverend".

== Anglican ==
In the Anglican Communion, the style is applied to archbishops (including those who, for historical reasons, bear an alternative title, such as presiding bishop), rather than the style "The Right Reverend" which is used by other bishops. "The Most Reverend" is used by both primates (the senior archbishop of each independent national or regional church) and metropolitan archbishops (as metropolitan of an ecclesiastical province within a national or regional church).

Retired archbishops usually revert to being styled "The Right Reverend", although they may be appointed "archbishop emeritus" by their province on retirement, in which case they retain the title "archbishop" and the style "The Most Reverend", as a courtesy. Archbishop Desmond Tutu was a prominent example. Uniquely within Anglicanism, for historical reasons, the Bishop of Meath and Kildare is also given this style, despite not being an archbishop.

== See also ==
- The Very Reverend
