= Bishop of Plymouth (Anglican) =

Episcopal title used in the Church of England Diocese of Exeter

The Anglican Bishop of Plymouth is an episcopal title used by a suffragan bishop of the Church of England Diocese of Exeter, in the Province of Canterbury, England. The title takes its name after the city of Plymouth in Devon; the See was erected under the Suffragans Nomination Act 1888 by Order in Council dated 21 November 1922. The suffragan bishop has particular episcopal oversight of the archdeaconries of Plymouth and of Totnes.

The current bishop, since September 2022, is James Grier.

== List of Bishops of Plymouth ==
Anglican Bishops of Plymouth
From	Until	Incumbent	Notes
1923	1933	Howard Masterman	
1934	1950	Whitfield Daukes	
1950	1962	Norman Clarke	
1962	1972	Guy Sanderson	
1972	1982	Richard Cartwright	
1982	1988	Kenneth Newing	
1988	1996	Richard Hawkins	Translated to Crediton
1996	2005	John Garton	
2005	2013	John Ford	Translated to The Murray, Australia
19 April 2015	2022	Nick McKinnel	Translated from Crediton 19 April 2015.
Sep 2022	present	James Grier	Consecrated 29 September 2022
