= Anglican Province of South Australia =

Ecclesiastical province of the Anglican Church of Australia

Province of South Australia
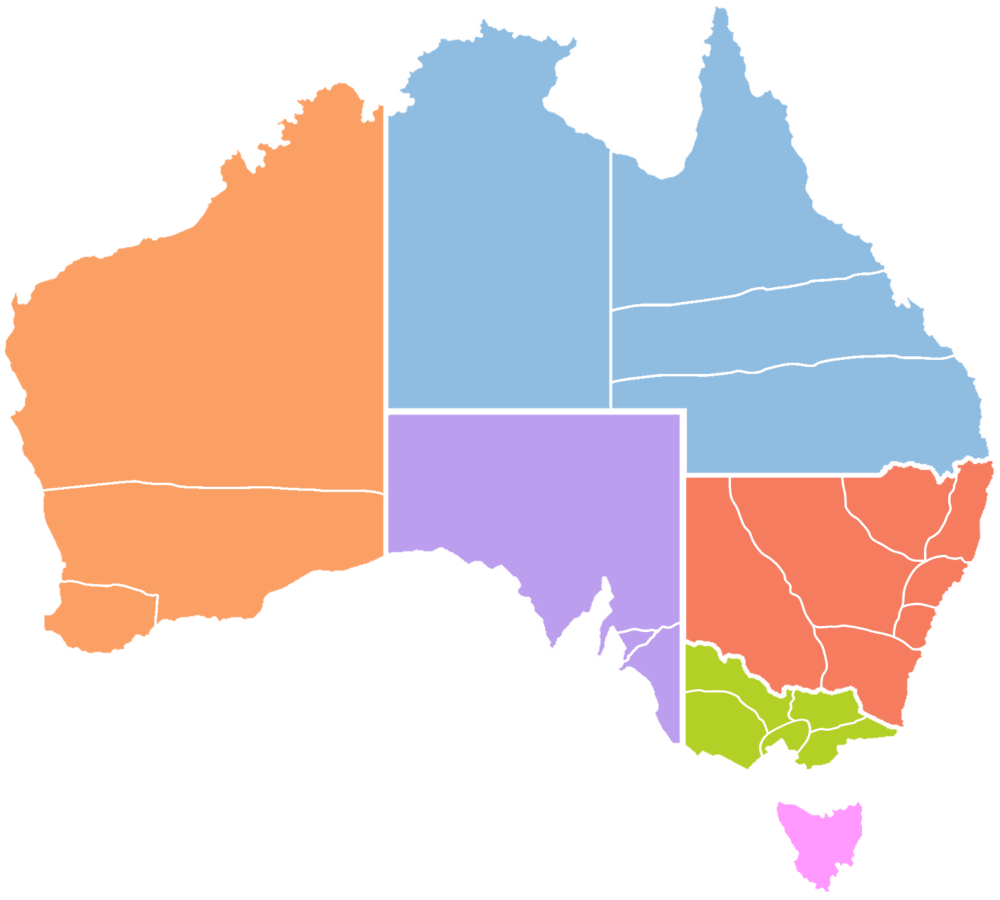
- Location of the Province (depicted in purple) in Australia
- Church: Anglican Church of Australia
- Metropolitan bishop: Archbishop of Adelaide
- Cathedral: St Peter's Cathedral, Adelaide
- Dioceses: Three

The Province of South Australia is an ecclesiastical province of the Anglican Church of Australia, the boundaries of which are those of the state of South Australia. The province consists of three dioceses: Adelaide, The Murray and Willochra.

The Archbishop of Adelaide is ex officio the metropolitan of the province. Since 2026, the position has been held by Brad Billings.
