= Helen Carboon =

Australian religious sister

Sister Helen Carboon pbvm
- Carboon in 2026

Personal life
- Known for: Being the congregational leader of the Presentation Sisters in Victoria
- Occupation: Religious sister, author

Religious life
- Religion: Christianity
- Denomination: Roman Catholic
- Order: Presentation Sisters

Sister Helen Carboon, pbvm is an Australian religious sister and current congregation leader for the Presentation Sisters of Victoria. She is also the Chair of the Australian Religious Archive Committee, a partnership between the University of Divinity and several religious congregations.

== Biography ==
Sister Helen Carboon joined the Catholic Presentation Sisters of Victoria in the 1970s. Founded by the venerable Nano Nagle, who was dedicated to educating poor children in Ireland, the Sisters of the Presentation of the Virgin Mary is a Roman Catholic religious order dedicated to teaching and service to the poor. The Presentation Sisters first arrived in Australia in 1866. They came to Victoria in December 1873 and established their first convent in Windsor. In 2024, an event was held to celebrate 150 years of the Presentation Sisters in Victoria, at which Carboon presided in her role as congregational leader.

Carboon completed her Master of Ministry at what was then the Melbourne College of Divinity in 1999. The title of her dissertation was "God makes our hearts beat: a study of young children's images of God and their ways of relating to this God." She was the educational consultant on a book written by biblical scholar and fellow Presentation sister, Mary Coloe. Carboon also authored eight books written specifically for primary school-aged children in the Moments of Celebration series.

Carboon was interviewed along with historian Katharine Massam by Meredith Lake for the ABC Radio National program Soul Search. The episode, which aired in October 2024, was titled: "Nuns Now: the present and future of vowed religious life." The program coincided with the 150th anniversary of the arrival of the first Presentation Sisters in Melbourne and the publication of a book by Massam, The Promise and the Blessing: Presentation Sisters in Victoria Since Vatican II, which explores the history of the teaching order from 1958 to the present.

Carboon is the Chair of the Australian Religious Archive Committee, which is working to establish a joint religious archive to preserve the records of an initial group of five congregations. Participating groups include the Brigidine Sisters, Faithful Companions of Jesus, Missionary Sisters of Service, Presentation Sisters of Victoria, and the University of Divinity.

== Select publications ==
- Carboon, Helen (2018), Celebrations, Garratt Publishing, ISBN 978-1-925009-46-0
- Carboon, Helen (2018), Getting ready to eat, Garratt Publishing, ISBN 978-1-925009-40-8
- Carboon, Helen (2018), Feelings come and go, Garratt Publishing, ISBN 978-1-925009-42-2
- Carboon, Helen (2018), Angus is sorry, Garratt Publishing, ISBN 978-1-925009-45-3
- Carboon, Helen (2018), We are glad you are here, Garratt Publishing, ISBN 978-1-925009-39-2
- Carboon, Helen (2018), My family tree, Garratt Publishing, ISBN 978-1-925009-41-5
- Carboon, Helen (2018), When you were little, Garratt Publishing, ISBN 978-1-925009-44-6
- Carboon, Helen (2018), Nana, why do you go to mass?, Garratt Publishing, ISBN 978-1-925009-43-9
- Carboon, Helen (2018), Moments of Celebration Review Pack of 8 Titles, Garratt Publishing, ISBN 978-1-925009-48-4
- Carboon, Helen (2015), Pope Francis big book, Garratt Publishing, ISBN 978-1-925009-81-1
- Carboon, Helen (2014), Living faith, Garratt Publishing, ISBN 978-1-925009-49-1
