= Elizabeth Boase =

Australian Old Testament biblical scholar

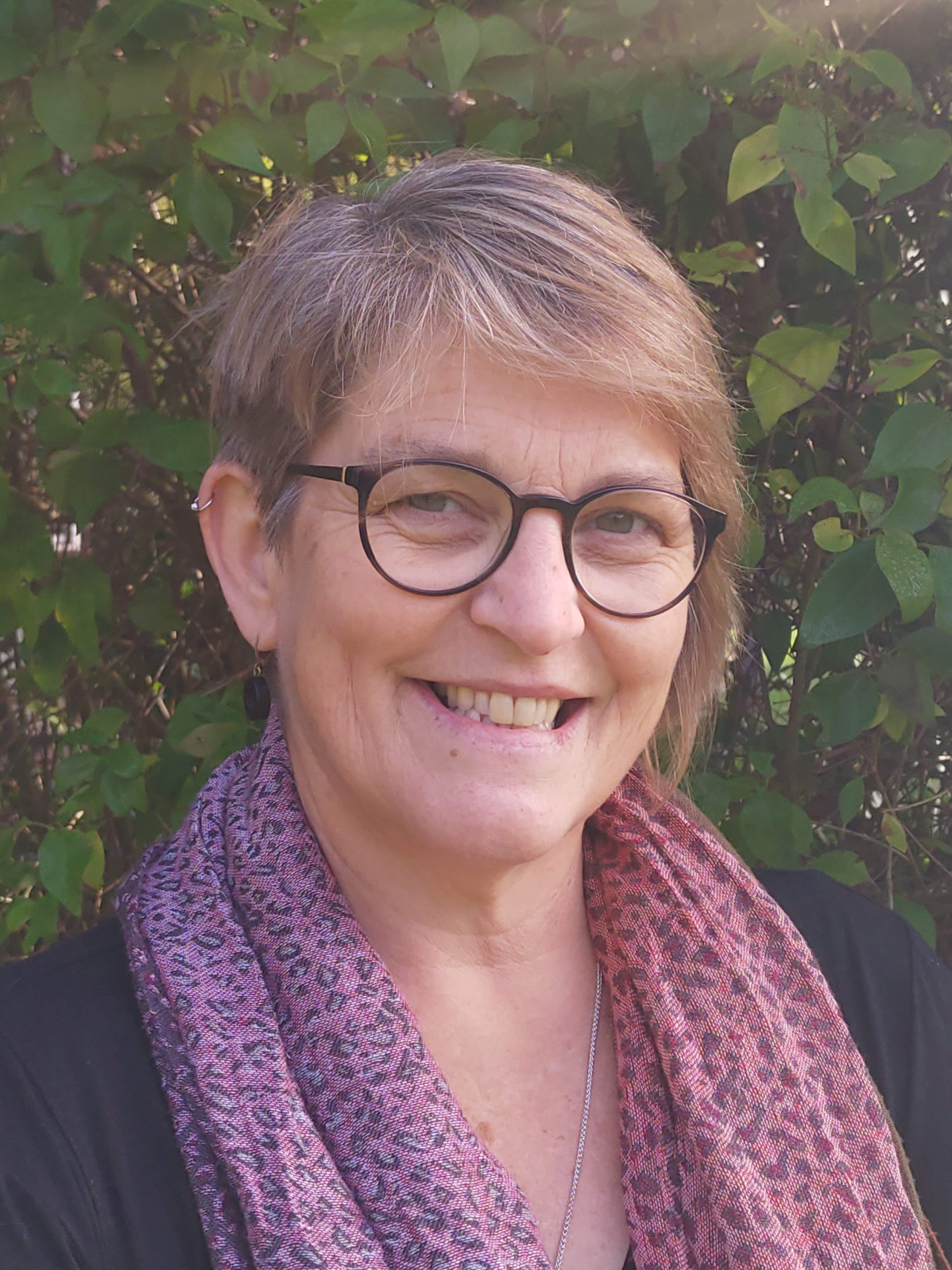
- Born: 1963
- Alma mater: Murdoch University
- Occupation: Academic staff
- Employer: Adelaide College of Divinity (2009–2020); Flinders University (2009–2020); Uniting College for Leadership and Theology (2009–2020); University of Divinity (2020–)
- Website: staff.divinity.edu.au/staff/liz-boase/

Elizabeth Boase (born 1963) is an Australian biblical scholar and the inaugural Dean of the School of Graduate Research at the University of Divinity in Melbourne. Boase uses a range of hermeneutical approaches in her work but is particularly known for her use of trauma theory as an hermeneutical lens to interpret the Bible. She also publishes in the areas of Hebrew Bible, the Book of Lamentations, the Book of Jeremiah, Biblical Hermeneutics, Bakhtin and the Bible, and Ecological Hermeneutics.

== Life and career ==
Boase studied applied science (speech and hearing) at the Western Australia Institute of Technology, now known as Curtin University. Following graduation, she worked as a speech therapist.

She is a member of the Uniting Church of Australia and at the age of 25 she was serving as an elder in the church. She was commissioned as a lay preacher in 1994.

She completed a Bachelor of Divinity (Honours) at Murdoch University in Perth. Studying part-time while raising two children, she completed her doctoral studies at Murdoch University in 2003. Boase was a lecturer at the University of Notre Dame Australia in Fremantle from 2004 to 2008. She later worked at the Uniting College for Leadership and Theology in South Australia where she was a lecturer in Old Testament and co-director of Biblical studies.

Boase also taught at the Adelaide College of Divinity and Flinders University from 2009 to 2019. She became head of the theology department at Flinders University and academic dean of the Adelaide College of Divinity.

In February 2020, Boase began work as the inaugural dean for the School of Graduate Research at the University of Divinity in Melbourne.

== Research ==
Boase's first book explored the relationship between the Book of Lamentations and prophetic literature in the Hebrew Bible. A revision of her PhD thesis, The Fulfillment of Doom? The Dialogic Interaction between the Book of Lamentation and the Pre-Exilic/Early Exilic Prophetic Literature, was published in 2006 by T&T Clark, volume 437 in The Library of Hebrew Bible/Old Testament Studies series. The book utilises Mikhail Bahktin's literary theory as an interpretive lens. According to one reviewer, "Boase's study has opened Lamentations in new ways and in doing so has demonstrated the usefulness of new methodological approaches." A second reviewer noted that "Boase's revised dissertation (2003, directed by Sue Boorer), is important for scholars of Lamentations, prophecy, and the interactions between them.

Boase is a scholar at the intersection of trauma theory and biblical hermeneutics. She co-edited, with Christopher G. Frechette, Bible through the Lens of Trauma, which was published by SBL Press in 2016, number 86 in Semeia Studies. Described as a "landmark collection of essays on the use of trauma as a hermeneutical lens in biblical studies", the work explores how insights from the disciplines of psychology, sociology and literary and cultural studies inform biblical trauma hermeneutics.

Boase has also written about ecological hermeneutics and contributed to Ecological Aspects of War: Engagements with Biblical Texts, edited by Anne Elvey and Keith Dyer.

Boase has served as co-chair of the Biblical Literature and the Hermeneutics of Trauma section for the Society of Biblical Literature. She is a member of the Fellowship of Biblical Studies. She is on the editorial board of the Journal of Biblical Literature and is the general editor of the Trauma Readings Series published by Sheffield Phoenix Press.

The Global Church Project included Boase in its list of "20 Australian and New Zealander Female Theologians you should get to know in 2020".

She was awarded the Gold Award for Best Theological Article by the Australasian Religious Press Association in 2013. The award was given for her article "Learning in Lament, published in New Times in October 2012.

== Selected works ==
=== Books ===
- ——— (2006). The Fulfillment of Doom? : the Dialogic Interaction between the Book of Lamentations and the Pre-exilic/early Exilic Prophetic Literature. New York; London: T&T Clark. ISBN 978-0-567-02672-9.
- Boase, Elizabeth; Frechette, Christopher G., eds. (2016). Bible through the Lens of Trauma. Atlanta, GA: SBL Press. ISBN 9780884141730.

=== Book chapters ===
- ——— (2017). "Desolate Land / Desolate People in Jeremiah and Lamentations". In Anne Elvey; Dyer, Keith (eds.). Ecological Aspects of War: Engagements with Biblical Texts. London; New York: Bloomsbury T & T Clark. pp. 97–115. doi:10.5040/9780567676412-ch-007. ISBN 9780567676405.
- ——— (2016). "Fragmented Voices: Collective Identity and traumatization in Lamentations". In Boase, Elizabeth; Frechette, Christopher G. (eds.). Bible through the Lens of Trauma. Atlanta, GA: SBL Press. pp. 49–66. ISBN 9780884141730.
- ———; Frechette, Christopher G. (2016). "Defining 'Trauma' as a Useful Lens for Biblical Interpretation". In Boase, Elizabeth; Frechette, Christopher G. (eds.). Bible through the Lens of Trauma. Atlanta, GA: SBL Press. pp. 1–23. ISBN 9780884141730.
- ——— (2014). "The Traumatized Body: Communal Trauma and Somatization in Lamentations". In Becker, Eve-Marie (ed.). Trauma and Traumatization in Individual and Collective Dimensions : Insights from Biblical Studies and Beyond. Göttingen: Vandenhoeck & Ruprecht. pp. 193–209. ISBN 9783525536162.
- ———; Taylor, Steve (2013). "Public lament". In Bier, Miriam J.; Bulkeley, Tim (eds.). Spiritual Complaint: The Theology and Practice of Lament. Eugene, OR: Pickwick Publications. pp. 205–227. ISBN 9781610977432.
- ——— (2013). "Blurring the Boundaries: The Rhetoric of Lament and Penitence in Isaiah 63: 7–64: 11". In Bier, Miriam J.; Bulkeley, Tim (eds.). Spiritual Complaint: The Theology and Practice of Lament. Eugene, OR: Pickwick Publications. pp. 71–87. ISBN 9781610977432.
- ——— (2011). "The Characterisation of God in Lamentations". In Cadwallader, Alan H. (ed.). Hermeneutics and the authority of scripture. Hindmarsh, South Australia: ATF Theology. ISBN 9781921817151.

=== Articles ===
- ——— (2019). "Mis-placed Bodies: the Interpenetration of Body and Place in Jeremiah". Australian Biblical Review. 67: 48–59.
- ———; Agnew, Sarah (2016). "Whispered in the Sound of Silence: Traumatising the Book of Jonah". Bible and Critical Theory. 12 (1): 4–22. Access Article
- ——— (2014). "Grounded in the Body: a Bakhtinian Reading of Lamentations 2 from another Perspective". Biblical Interpretation. 22 (3): 292–306.
- ——— (2012). "The Cursing Psalms: What are they, why are they there and how do we Pray them Today?". New Norcia Studies. 20: 59–65.
- ——— (2008). "Constructing Meaning in the Face of Suffering: Theodicy in Lamentations". Vetus Testamentum. 58 (4–5): 449–468. doi:10.1163/156853308X325029. Link to Publisher version (DOI)
- ——— (2008). "To Imprecate or Not: Psalm 137 and its Appropriation in Music". Conversations: An e-Journal from the Uniting Church. 2 (3): 1–6. Access Article
- ——— (2008). "The Characterisation of God in Lamentations". Australian Biblical Review. 56: 32–44. Access Article
- ——— (2005). "The Many Voices of Lament: an Exploration of the Book of Lamentations". Australian Journal of Liturgy. 10 (1): 3–26. Access Article
- ——— (2001). "Life in the Shadows: The Role and Function of Isaac in Genesis - Synchronic and Diachronic Readings". Vetus Testamentum. 51 (3): 312–335. doi:10.1163/15685330152913594. Link to Publisher Version (DOI)

== See also ==
- Biblical hermeneutics
