= Anne Pattel-Gray =

Indigenous Australian theologian and academic

Anne Pattel-Gray is an Aboriginal Australian theologian and author who is an expert on Black theology. She is a descendant of the Bidjara people of Queensland and was the first Aboriginal person to earn a PhD at the University of Sydney.

== Early life and education ==
Pattel-Gray was born in Winton, Queensland. She is a descendant of the Bidjara/Kari Kari people in Queensland and a product of the stolen generation. She has a twin sister, Narelle. Their father deserted the family when they were 10 years old; their mother, Jean, was a loyal member of the Methodist Church and raised them in that tradition. Her family were members of the first Aboriginal church in Townsville led by Rev Charlie Harris.

In 1995, Pattel-Gray graduated with a PhD in religion from the University of Sydney, with a thesis entitled "The Great White Flood: Racism in Australia; Critically Appraised from an Aboriginal Historico-Theological Viewpoint". She was the first Aboriginal person to earn a PhD from the university. In 1997, she received a Doctor of Divinity in India.

== Career ==
From 1989 to 1998, Pattel-Gray was the founding executive secretary of the Aboriginal and Islander Commission of the National Council of Churches. She was mentored by theologian and activist Charlie Harris, whom she believes was "compelled to hold governments and churches accountable". In 1998, she worked alongside him in organising "The March for Freedom Justice and Hope" on 26 January, a protest of over 40,000 people seeking to remind the country in the midst of its bicentennial celebrations that "White Australia had a Black History". Pattel-Gray later said prevented from taking his "rightful place" as President of the Uniting Aboriginal and Islander Christian Congress and that her support for Harris led to her being "driven out" of the Congress and "marginalised" in the Uniting Church.

In 1998, Pattel-Gray went to India, where she was full professor and chair of her department at United Theological College, Bangalore until 2001. From 2003 until 2007 she was executive director of Tauondi College, an Aboriginal college, and from 2007 to 2010 she was Deputy Chairperson of Connecting Foster Carers in South Australia. From 2011, she was CEO of Murra Innovations Limited, a charity that was deregistered by the ACNC in 2016. Since 2015, she has been CEO of Q Solutions. She is also head of the Australian First Nations program at World Vision Australia. She has chaired the boards of Adelaide North TAFE, the Kaurna Plains Child Care Centre, the Aboriginal Advancement League SA and the National Aboriginal Women's Alliance and is a board member of the International Association of Black Religions and Spiritualities. She has been a visiting professor at universities, including Ewha Womans University in Seoul, Gurukul Lutheran Theological College in India and Spelman College, Loyola Marymount University and Harvard University in the US.

Pattel-Gray is a campaigner and lobbyist for justice and equal representation for Aboriginal and Torres Strait Islander people. She was the first person to bring the details of the Stolen Generations to a large international forum at the World Council of Churches in Canberra in 1991. She is recognised as an expert on Black theology. In 2011, Pattel-Gray gave the address at the Myall Creek Memorial ceremony. In June 2016, she was a keynote speaker at the Popular Indigenous Conference on Reconciliation in Norway, and in July 2019, at Common Dream, a conference for progressive religious thought and action in Australia. In July 2021, she gave the annual Northey Lecture at the Uniting Church's Centre for Theology and Ministry on "Red Ochre Theology".

In August 2022, Pattel-Gray was appointed as the Professor of Indigenous Studies and Head of the School of Indigenous Studies at the University of Divinity.

In July 2024, at the Seventeenth Assembly of the Uniting Church in Australia, Professor Pattel-Gray was one of three nominees for the role of President-Elect https://uniting.church/wp-content/uploads/2024/07/D2-Profiles-of-President-elect-Nominees.pdf. Pattel-Gray did not proceed beyond the first round of voting.

=== Writing ===
Pattel-Gray's first book, The Great White Flood: Racism in Australia, based on her PhD thesis, focuses on the historical relationship between the church, the government, and Aboriginal people, contending that racism is rooted in the "long and corrupt" relationship between the government and the church. She calls the invasion and theft of the land the "original sin" that Australian churches have to deal with if they want to relate meaningfully to Aboriginal peoples. Reviewer Mark Hutchinson said the book's "point is well taken" and the author's "anger and hurt are undeniable", but that it relied too heavily on the scholarship of others and takes a "confrontationalist" approach. Her colleague Garry Trompf noted that there is "no aspect of the settler capitalist heritage that has been left untouched by Pattel-Gray's uncomfortable analysis."

Pattel-Gray uses Black womanist theology from America to understand the situation of Aboriginal women, but has received some criticism for obscuring the uniqueness of Aboriginal women's spirituality, in contrast to her earlier works. In more recent work, she has highlighted the differences between US and Aboriginal Black people. Pattel-Gray has also noted that many male researchers had either overlooked or disregarded the fact that some Aboriginal societies are matriarchal. She has also written on Charles Harris' contribution to Australian indigenous theology.

== Personal life ==
Pattel-Gray is a mother of five children.

== Selected publications ==
=== Books ===
- Pattel-Gray, Anne (1991). Through Aboriginal Eyes: The Cry from the Wilderness. WCC Publ. ISBN 2825409995.
- Pattel-Gray, Anne (1996). Aboriginal Spirituality: Past, Present, Future. Harper Collins. ISBN 9781863715959.
- Pattel-Gray, Anne (1996). Martung Utah: Black and white Australians seeking partnership. Australian Council of Churches.
- Pattel-Gray, Anne (1997). Indigenous Australia: a dialog about the word becoming flesh in aboriginal churches. WCC Publications.
- Pattel-Gray, Anne (1998). The great white flood: racism in Australia. Scholars Press. ISBN 9780788501326.

=== Articles and chapters ===
- Pattel-Gray, Anne (1991). "Hope for the future (autobiography)". In Ranjini Rebera; Michaela Richards (eds.). Remembering the Future: Australian Women's Stories, Dreams and Visions for the Twenty-First Century. David Lovell. pp. 103–108.
- Anne, Pattel-Gray; Trompf, Garry W. (1993). "Styles of Australian Aboriginal and Melanesian Theology" (PDF). International Review of Mission. 82 (326): 167–188. doi:10.1111/j.1758-6631.1993.tb02660.x.
- Pattel-Gray, Anne; Smith-Christopher, Daniel L. (1995). "Dreaming: An aboriginal interpretation of the Bible". Text & Experience: 247–259.
- Pattel-Gray, Anne (1995). "Not Yet Tiddas: An Aboriginal Womanist Critique of Australian Church Feminism". In Maryanne Confoy; Dorothy Lee; Joan Nowotny (eds.). Freedom and Entrapment: Women Thinking Theology. Dove. pp. 165–192. ISBN 9781863715553.
- Pattel-Gray, Anne (1999). "The Hard Truth: White Secrets, Black Realities". Australian Feminist Studies. 14 (30): 259–266. doi:10.1080/08164649993092.
- Pattel-Gray, Anne (2001). "Black Truth, White Fiction". In Frances Devlin-Glass; Lyn McCredden (eds.). Feminist Poetics of the Sacred: Creative Suspicions. Oxford University Press. pp. 55–69. ISBN 978-0-19-514469-7.
- Pattel-Gray, Anne (2004). "The Aboriginal Process of lnculturation". Australian Religion Studies Review. 17 (1).
- Pattel-Gray, Anne (2014). "Spirituality". In Dwight N Hopkins; Marjorie Lewis (eds.). Another World is Possible: Spiritualities and Religions of Global Darker Peoples. Routledge. pp. 64–74. ISBN 9781317490463.
- Pattel-Gray, Anne (2012). "Methodology in an Aboriginal theology". In Dwight N. Hopkins; Edward P. Antonio (eds.). The Cambridge Companion to Black Theology. Cambridge University Press. pp. 278–297. ISBN 978-0-521-87986-6.
