= List of acts of the Parliament of Victoria from 1910 =

This is a list of acts of the Parliament of Victoria, Australia for the year 1910.

== 1910 ==
Short title, or popular name	Citation	Royal assent
Long title
Sheep Dipping Act 1909 (Note: Although the short title of this act ends "... Act 1909", it was passed in the year 1910.) (repealed)	9 Edw. VII. No. 2216	4 January 1910
An Act to provide for the Compulsory Dipping of Sheep. (Repealed by Sheep Dipping Act 1915 (6 Geo. V. No. 2727))
Eltham to Hurst's Bridge Railway Construction Act 1909	9 Edw. VII. No. 2217	4 January 1910
An Act to authorize the Construction by the State of a Line of Railway from Eltham to Hurst's Bridge.
Cemeteries Act 1909 (repealed)	9 Edw. VII. No. 2218	4 January 1910
An Act to further amend the Cemeteries Act 1890. (Note: Cemeteries Act 1890 (54 Vict. No. 1072)) (Repealed by Cemeteries Act 1915 (6 Geo. V. No. 2626))
Water Supply Loans Application Act 1909 (No. 2)	9 Edw. VII. No. 2219	4 January 1910
An Act to sanction the issue and application of certain Sums of Money available under Loan Acts for Water Supply in Country Districts and for other purposes.
Gheringhap to Maroona Railway Construction Act 1909	9 Edw. VII. No. 2220	4 January 1910
An Act to authorize the Construction by the State of a Line of Railway from Gheringhap o Maroona.
Woolamai to Powlett Coal Field Railway Construction Act 1909	9 Edw. VII. No. 2221	4 January 1910
An Act to authorize the Construction by the State of a Line of Railway from Woolamai to Powlett Coal Field.
Noradjuha to Toolondo Railway Construction Act 1909	9 Edw. VII. No. 2222	4 January 1910
An Act to authorize the Construction by the State of a Line of Rail way from Noradjuha to Toolondo.
Bairnsdale to Orbost Railway Construction Act 1909	9 Edw. VII. No. 2223	4 January 1910
An Act to authorize the Construction by the State of a Line of Railway from Bairnsdale to Orbost.
Jeparit to Lorquon Railway Construction Act 1909	9 Edw. VII. No. 2224	4 January 1910
An Act to authorize the Construction by the State of a Line of Railway from Jeparit to Lorquon.
Railway Loan Application Act 1909 (No. 2)	9 Edw. VII. No. 2225	4 January 1910
An Act to sanction the issue and application of certain sums of Money available under Loan Acts for Railways.
Water Act 1909 (repealed)	9 Edw. VII. No. 2226	4 January 1910
An Act to further amend the Water Act 1905 (Note: Water Act 1905 (5 Edw. VII. No. 2016)) and for other purposes. (Repealed by Water Act 1915 (6 Geo. V. No. 2747))
Infants Relief Act 1909 (repealed)	9 Edw. VII. No. 2227	4 January 1910
An Act to amend the Law as to the Contracts of Infants. (Repealed by Supreme Court Act 1915 (6 Geo. V. No. 2733))
Land Act 1909 (repealed)	9 Edw. VII. No. 2228	4 January 1910
An Act to further amend the Land Acts and for other purposes. (Repealed by Land Act 1915 (6 Geo. V. No. 2676))
Closer Settlement Act 1909 (No. 2) (repealed)	9 Edw. VII. No. 2229	4 January 1910
An Act to amend the Law relating to Closer Settlement and Small Improved Holdings and for other purposes. (Repealed by Closer Settlement Act 1915 (6 Geo. V. No. 2629))
Geelong Waterworks and Sewerage Act 1909 (repealed)	9 Edw. VII. No. 2230	4 January 1910
An Act to amend the Geelong Municipal Waterworks Act 1907 (Note: Geelong Municipal Waterworks Act 1907 (7 Edw. VII. No. 2109)) and to provide for Sewering and Cleansing of the Town of Geelong and District. (Repealed by Geelong Waterworks and Sewerage Act 1915 (6 Geo. V. No. 2661))
Borough of Hamilton Town Hall Act 1909	9 Edw. VII. No. 2231	4 January 1910
An Act to enable the Council of the Borough of Hamilton to sell the site of the Town Hall in the said Borough and for other purposes.
Chaff and Stock Food Act 1909 (No. 2)	9 Edw. VII. No. 2232	4 January 1910
An Act to amend the Chaff and Stock Food Act 1909. (Note: Chaff and Stock Food Act 1909 (9 Edw. VII. No. 2183))
Wimmera Inland Freezing Company's Act 1909	9 Edw. VII. No. 2233	4 January 1910
An Act to provide for the Registration under Part I. of the Companies Act 1890 (Note: Companies Act 1890 (54 Vict. No. 1074)) of a Company to be called The Wimmera Inland Freezing Company.
Melbourne Harbor Trust Act 1909 (repealed)	9 Edw. VII. No. 2234	4 January 1910
An Act to authorize the Melbourne Harbor Trust Commissioners to exchange and transfer certain Lands in the City of Melbourne. (Repealed by Melbourne Harbor Trust Act 1915 (6 Geo. V. No. 2697)
Settled Estates and Settled Lands Act 1909 (repealed)	9 Edw. VII. No. 2235	4 January 1910
An Act to Consolidate and Amend the Law relating to Settled Estates and Settled Land. (Repealed by Settled Estates and Settled Lands Act 1915 (6 Geo. V. No. 2725))
	9 Edw. VII. No. 2236	4 January 1910
An Act to further continue the Voting by Post Acts. (Repealed by Constitution Act Amendment Act 1915 (6 Geo. V. No. 2632))
Motor Car Act 1909 (repealed)	9 Edw. VII. No. 2237	4 January 1910
An Act to regulate the use of Motor Cars. (Repealed by Motor Car Act 1915 (6 Geo. V. No. 2702))
Geelong Harbor Trust Act 1909 (repealed)	9 Edw. VII. No. 2238	4 January 1910
An Act to amend the Geelong Harbor Trust Act 1905. (Note: Geelong Harbor Trust Act 1905 (5 Edw. VII. No. 2012)) (Repealed by Geelong Harbor Trust Act 1915 (6 Geo. V. No. 2660))
Assembly Electoral Rolls Act 1909 (No. 2) (repealed)	9 Edw. VII. No. 2239	4 January 1910
An Act relating to the Electoral Rolls for the Legislative Assembly for the year One thousand nine hundred and ten. (Repealed by Constitution Act Amendment Act 1915 (6 Geo. V. No. 2632))
Coal Mines Regulation Act 1909 (repealed)	9 Edw. VII. No. 2240	4 January 1910
An Act to provide for the Regulation of Coal Mines. (Repealed by Coal Mines Regulation Act 1915 (6 Geo. V. No. 2630))
Factories and Shops Act 1909 (No. 2) (repealed)	9 Edw. VII. No. 2241	4 January 1910
An Act to amend the Factories and Shops Acts. (Repealed by Factories and Shops Act 1912 (3 Geo. V. No. 2386))
	1 Geo. V. No. 2242	13 July 1910
An Act to apply out of the Consolidated Revenue the sum of One million one hundred and twenty-three thousand nine hundred and two pounds to the service of the year One thousand nine hundred and ten and One thousand nine hundred and eleven.
University Act 1910 (repealed)	1 Geo. V. No. 2243	16 August 1910
An Act to further amend the Law relating to the University of Melbourne. (Repealed by University Act 1915 (6 Geo. V. No. 2742))
	1 Geo. V. No. 2244	30 August 1910
An Act to apply out of the Consolidated Revenue the sum of Four hundred and forty-eight thousand and thirty-three pounds to the service of the year One thousand nine hundred and nine and One thousand nine hundred and ten.
	1 Geo. V. No. 2245	9 September 1910
An Act to apply out of the Consolidated Revenue the sum of Nine hundred and seventy-six thousand eight hundred and forty-nine pounds to the service of the year One thousand nine hundred and ten and One thousand nine hundred and eleven.
St. Kilda Land Act 1910	1 Geo. V. No. 2246	6 October 1910
An Act to provide for the Closing of certain Streets in the City of St. Kilda and for other purposes.
Beulah Show Yards Land Act 1910	1 Geo. V. No. 2247	6 October 1910
An Act to revoke the Permanent Reservation of certain Land in the Township of Beulah reserved as a Site for Show Yards.
Ballarat Public Gardens Land Act 1910	1 Geo. V. No. 2248	6 October 1910
An Act to revoke the Permanent Reservation and Crown Grant of certain Land in the City of Ballaarat reserved as a Site for Public Gardens,
Commissions of Inquiry Act 1910 (repealed)	1 Geo. V. No. 2249	6 October 1910
An Act to amend the Law relating to Commissions of Inquiry issued by the Governor in Council. (Repealed by Evidence Act 1915 (6 Geo. V. No. 2647))
Wrongs Act 1910 (repealed)	1 Geo. V. No. 2250	11 October 1910
An Act to amend the Wrongs Act 1890. (Note: Wrongs Act 1890 (54 Vict. No. 1160)) (Repealed by Wrongs Act 1915 (6 Geo. V. No. 2751))
Bankers' Books Evidence Act 1910 (repealed)	1 Geo. V. No. 2251	11 October 1910
An act to amend the Evidence Act 1890. (Note: Evidence Act 1890 (54 Vict. No. 1088)) (Repealed by Evidence Act 1915 (6 Geo. V. No. 2647))
Stock Mortgages Act 1910 (repealed)	1 Geo. V. No. 2252	11 October 1910
An Act to amend the Law relating to Mortgages of Stock. (Repealed by Instruments Act 1915 (6 Geo. V. No. 2672))
Fences Act 1910 (repealed)	1 Geo. V. No. 2253	11 October 1910
An Act to amend the Fences Acts. (Repealed by Fences Act 1915 (6 Geo. V. No. 2651))
Melbourne and Metropolitan Board of Works Act 1910 (repealed)	1 Geo. V. No. 2254	19 October 1910
An Act to amend the Melbourne and Metropolitan Board of Works Acts with respect to the Area of Water Supply. (Repealed by Melbourne and Metropolitan Board of Works Act 1915 (6 Geo. V. No. 2696))
Aborigines Act 1910 (repealed)	1 Geo. V. No. 2255	19 October 1910
An Act to extend the powers of the Board for the Protection of the Aborigines. (Repealed by Aborigines Act 1915 (6 Geo. V. No. 2610))
	1 Geo. V. No. 2256	19 October 1910
An Act to apply out of the Consolidated Revenue the sum of Nine hundred and fifty-two thousand three hundred and eighty-six pounds to the service of the year One thousand nine hundred and ten and One thousand nine hundred and eleven.
Dentists Act 1910 (repealed)	1 Geo. V. No. 2257	15 November 1910
An Act to further amend the Law relating to Dentistry. (Repealed by Medical Act 1915 (6 Geo. V. No. 2695))
Homing Pigeons Act 1910 (repealed)	1 Geo. V. No. 2258	15 November 1910
An Act for the Better Protection of Homing Pigeons. (Repealed by Police Offences Act 1915 (6 Geo. V. No. 2708))
Mont Park Land Act 1910	1 Geo. V. No. 2259	15 November 1910
An Act to provide for the Exchange of certain Land at Mont Park, Parish of Keelbundora, for Asylum purposes.
Geelong and District Trustees Company Limited Act 1910	1 Geo. V. No. 2260	30 November 1910
An Act to confer Powers upon Geelong and District Trustees Company Limited.
Forests Act 1910 (repealed)	1 Geo. V. No. 2261	30 November 1910
An Act to further amend the Forests Act 1907. (Note: Forests Act 1907 (7 Edw. VII. No. 2095)) (Repealed by Forests Act 1915 (6 Geo. V. No. 2655))
Melbourne Benevolent Asylum Act 1910	1 Geo. V. No. 2262	30 November 1910
An Act to amend the Melbourne Benevolent Asylum Act 1904. (Note: Melbourne Benevolent Asylum Act 1904 (4 Edw. VII. No. 1923))
Geelong Market Site Act 1910	1 Geo. V. No. 2263	30 November 1910
An Act to enable the Council of the Town of Geelong to grant Building Leases of portion of the Land known as the General Market Site and for other purposes.
Marquis of Linlithgow Memorial Site Act 1910	1 Geo. V. No. 2264	30 November 1910
An Act to provide for the setting apart of a Site for the erection of a Memorial in honour of the late Marquis of Linlithgow. (Note: John Hope, 7th Earl of Hopetoun, Governor of Victoria from 1889 to 1895; Governor-General of Australia from 1900 to 1902.)
Arbitration Act 1910 (repealed)	1 Geo. V. No. 2265	17 December 1910
An Act to amend the Law relating to Arbitration. (Repealed by Arbitration Act 1915 (6 Geo. V. No. 2614))
St. Kilda Shore Act 1910	1 Geo. V. No. 2266	17 December 1910
An Act to authorize the resumption by the Crown of certain Laud vested in the Melbourne Harbor Trust Commissioners.
Municipal Endowment Act 1910	1 Geo. V. No. 2267	17 December 1910
An Act to amend the Municipal Endowment Act 1907. (Note: Municipal Endowment Act 1907 (7 Edw. VII. No. 2129))
Railways Advances Act 1910	1 Geo. V. No. 2268	17 December 1910
An Act to authorize the temporary application out of "The Public Account" of certain moneys for the purpose of substituting heavy rails for light rails on certain lines of railway.
Courts of Mines Act 1910 (repealed)	1 Geo. V. No. 2269	17 December 1910
An Act to empower the Courts of Mines to deal with Special Cases stated by a Warden. (Repealed by Mines Act 1915 (6 Geo. V. No. 2698))
Administration and Probate Duties Act 1910 (repealed)	1 Geo. V. No. 2270	17 December 1910
An Act relating to Duties payable under the Administration and Probate Acts. (Repealed by Administration and Probate Act 1915 (6 Geo. V. No. 2611))
Crown Lands Reserves Act 1910	1 Geo. V. No. 2271	17 December 1910
An Act to revoke the permanent reservation under Orders in Council of certain Crown Lands in the counties of Millewa, Croajingolong, and Dargo.
Kerang and Koondrook Tramway Act 1910	1 Geo. V. No. 2272	17 December 1910
An Act relating to the Kerang and Koondrook Tramway.
Seeds Act 1910 (repealed)	1 Geo. V. No. 2273	17 December 1910
An Act to regulate the Sale of Seeds for Planting or Sowing. (Repealed by Seeds Act 1915 (6 Geo. V. No. 2722))
Artificial Manures Act 1910 (repealed)	1 Geo. V. No. 2274	17 December 1910
An Act to further amend the Artificial Manures Acts. (Repealed by Fertilizers Act 1915 (6 Geo. V. No. 2652))
Melbourne College of Divinity Act 1910 or the University of Divinity Act 1910	1 Geo. V. No. 2275	17 December 1910
An Act to provide for the Constitution and Incorporation of a College of Divinity under the name of the Melbourne College of Divinity.
Railway Lands Acquisition Act 1910 (repealed)	1 Geo. V. No. 2276	17 December 1910
An Act to further amend the Railway Lands Acquisition Acts. (Repealed by Railway Lands Acquisition Act 1915 (6 Geo. V. No. 2715))
Public Account Advances Act 1910	1 Geo. V. No. 2277	17 December 1910
An Act to authorize the temporary application out of "The Public Account" of certain moneys to meet expenditure under certain Acts.
Income Tax Act 1910 (repealed)	1 Geo. V. No. 2278	17 December 1910
An Act to declare the Rates of Income Tax for the Year ending on the thirty-first day of December One thousand nine hundred and eleven and to continue the Income Tax Acts. (Repealed by Income Tax Act 1915 (6 Geo. V. No. 2668))
Bees Act 1910 (repealed)	1 Geo. V. No. 2279	17 December 1910
An Act relating to Diseases of Bees. (Repealed by Bees Act 1915 (6 Geo. V. No. 2619))
Savings Banks Act 1910	1 Geo. V. No. 2280	17 December 1910
An Act to further amend the Savings Banks Acts.
Residence Areas Holders Act 1910 (repealed)	1 Geo. V. No. 2281	17 December 1910
An Act to a mend the Law relating to Holders of Residence Areas under the Mines Acts who die Intestate. (Repealed by Mines Act 1915 (6 Geo. V. No. 2698))
Licensing Districts Inhabitants Act 1910 (repealed)	1 Geo. V. No. 2282	17 December 1910
An Act to amend Section Twenty-three of the Licensing Act 1890. (Note: Licensing Act 1890 (54 Vict. No. 1111)) (Repealed by Licensing Act 1915 (6 Geo. V. No. 2683))
	1 Geo. V. No. 2283	26 December 1910
An Act to apply a sum out of the Consolidated Revenue to the service of the year ending on the thirtieth day of June One thousand nine hundred and eleven and to appropriate the Supplies granted in this Session of Parliament.
Land Tax Act 1910 (repealed)	1 Geo. V. No. 2284	26 December 1910
An Act to provide for a Tax on the Unimproved Value of Land and for the Assessment of Land and other purposes. (Repealed by Land Tax Act 1915 (6 Geo. V. No. 2680))

== Sources ==
- "1910 Victorian Historical Acts". AustLII.
