= Katharine Massam =

Australian academic and church historian

- Born: Perth, Western Australia
- Occupations: Academic, church historian

Academic background
- Education: University of Western Australia PhD
- Thesis: Lay Catholic spirituality in Australia (1992)
- Doctoral advisor: Patricia Marcia Crawford and Tom Stannage

Academic work
- Discipline: Church history, Spirituality
- Institutions: University of Divinity
- Website: staff.divinity.edu.au/staff/katharine-massam

Katharine Massam is a professor of church history based at the University of Divinity in Melbourne, Australia.

== Early life and education ==
Katharine Therese Massam grew up in Perth, Western Australia. She completed a Bachelor of Arts (Hons) at the University of Western Australia and a Diploma of Education at Flinders University in Adelaide, South Australia, before going on to completing her PhD at the University of Western Australia in 1992. Her doctoral thesis was later published as Sacred Threads: Catholic Spirituality in Australia.

== Career ==
Massam worked as a lecturer in the History Department at the University of Adelaide from 1996-2000 and was also a postdoctoral research fellow at the Australian National University from 1994-2000. She also taught at the University of WA, Murdoch University and Edith Cowan University.

In 2000 Massam took up a role at what is now Pilgrim Theological College in Melbourne (formerly United Faculty of Theology). She was the first Catholic laywoman to be appointed to the ecumenical faculty. Massam served as Pilgrim Theological College's academic dean in 2016 and again from 2018-2020.

Massam's teaching and research interests lie in the areas of Australian religious history and spirituality (especially Benedictine traditions) with a particular interest in cultural and theological understandings of prayer and work. Her work is influenced by postcolonial and feminist perspectives and she has published widely in these areas.

In 2020 Massam's book A Bridge Between: Spanish Benedictine Missionary Women in Australia, was one of three books shortlisted for a national prize in Australian history, the New South Wales Premier's History Awards. The book stems from a long collaboration with the Aboriginal Corporation of New Norcia and Benedictine communities that served the monastic town of New Norcia, in Western Australia. Massam was invited to discuss the book and the Spanish Benedictine women with historian Meredith Lake, on ABC's Soul Search program. The book was also discussed when she was interviewed for the Love-Rinse/Repeat podcast.

Massam was elected as a member of the Australian Institute of Aboriginal and Torres Strait Islander Studies (AIATSIS) in 2017. She is the secretary of the Religious History Association and is also a founding member and current co-convenor of the Australian Collaborators in Feminist Theologies.

The Global Church Project included Massam in its list of 20 Australian and New Zealander Female Theologians you should get to know in 2020.

== Select publications ==
=== Books ===
- Massam, Katharine (2020) A Bridge Between: Spanish Benedictine Missionary Women in Australia. Australian National University Press, Canberra. 410pp. ISBN 9781760463519
- Massam, Katharine and Toso, Fotini (eds) (2016) The Greening of Hope: Hildegard for Australia (Edited Book). Wipf & Stock, Eugene. 124pp. ISBN 9781532610455
- Massam, Katharine (1997) On High Ground: Images of One Hundred Years at Aquinas College, Western Australia. University of Western Australia Press, Nedlands, Western Australia. 254pp. ISBN 1876268050
- Massam, Katharine (1996) Sacred Threads: Catholic Spirituality in Australia 1922 - 1962. University of New South Wales Press, Sydney. 295pp. ISBN 9780868401836
