= St Agnes' House =

Anglican theological college in Australia

St Agnes' House is an Australian educational institution in Melbourne, Victoria, established in 2022. From 2023 it will train candidates for ordination in the Anglican Church of Australia.

St Agnes' House is an initiative of the Anglican Parish of St John, East Malvern and St Agnes, Glen Huntly. It will provide a pathway for ordination with two key aims. First, to invest in full-time residential formation for ordained ministry focused on the parish context. Secondly, to renew the spiritual and missional life of the church of St Agnes', Glen Huntly through the prayer and energy of the St Agnes' House community. The house itself is the former vicarage of St Agnes'.

The ordination programme is intended for men and women under the age of 35 and who are supported by their bishop as candidates for ordination in Australia. It is a full-time 3-year programme, available to three ordinands who are to reside in the house. Academic degrees in theology are to be provided by Trinity College Theological School. It is modelled on the residential seminaries of the past: the Vicar of St Agnes', the Rev Dr Alexander Ross, (who trained, in part, at Ripon College Cuddesdon) has referred to his own ordination training in this respect.

The post of warden was advertised in 2022: Fr Peter Richards was appointed the first warden.
