= Joan Nowotny =

First woman dean of a theological institution in Australia

- Born: 18 August 1925; Melbourne, Australia
- Died: 29 June 2008 (aged 82); Box Hill, Australia
- Occupations: Dean, school principal, lecturer in philosophy
- Known for: First female dean of a theological institute in Australia

Joan Nowotny IBVM (18 August 1925 - 29 June 2008) was an Australian academic and professor of philosophy. She became the first woman to lead a theological institution in Australia, when she was appointed the academic dean of Yarra Theological Union.

== Early life and education ==
Joan Nowotny was born on 18 August 1925 in Melbourne, Australia, the first-born child of Henry and Mary Nowotny. Her father was a teacher who had emigrated from Vienna and settled in Australia, helping to found an orchestra in Perth. The family moved to Brisbane, Queensland, where Nowotny attended a convent school run by the Loreto Sisters.

After graduating from Loreto College in Brisbane, Nowotny pursued a career in teaching. Feeling called to the religious life, she made a profession of vows with the Loreto Sisters, known formally as the Institute of the Blessed Virgin Mary, and took the religious name Miriam. She served as a teacher in schools run by the order, including in Ballarat, and then in 1955, she was appointed principal of the Loreto school in Kirribilli. In 1957, she was transferred to Loreto Normanhurst, where she served as principal until 1965.

Nowotny enjoyed reading and teaching philosophy, and decided to earn advanced degrees in the field. She traveled to Canada, to earn a Master of Arts in Philosophy at the University of Toronto. She then began a PhD program, also at the University of Toronto, which she completed in 1974. During her studies, she travelled to Paris and studied with Paul Riccoeur and John Paul Sartre. She wrote her doctoral thesis on Gabriel Marcel's philosophy; she had the opportunity to meet and interview him while in Paris.

== Academic career ==
After completing her PhD, Nowotny served as principal at St Mary's College, Melbourne University. She then lectured in Philosophy at the University of Tasmania, while also serving as principal of Ena Waite College, University of Tasmania.

In 1980, she was appointed academic dean at Yarra Theological Union, a theological institute affiliated with the Melbourne College of Divinity. She was the first woman to hold the senior role of academic dean for any theological institute in Australia. She continued in this role until 1989.

From 1991 to 2003, after a year-long sabbatical, she taught philosophy and was chair of the department at Yarra Theological Union. In 1995, Nowotny co-edited a volume called Freedom and Entrapment: Women Thinking Theology, with Maryanne Confoy and Dorothy A. Lee. Nowotny retired in 2003.

Beyond her academic pursuits, Novotny was a crossword enthusiast, and wrote puzzles for the magazine Eureka Street.

== Death ==
Nowotny died on 29 June 2008 in Box Hill, Australia.

== Works ==
- Confoy, Maryanne, Dorothy A. Lee and Joan Nowotny, eds. Freedom and Entrapment: Women Thinking Theology. 1995. ISBN 186371555X, 978-1863715553

== See also ==
- University of Divinity
