= The Concept of Justice =

The Concept of Justice: Is Social Justice Just?
- First edition
- Author: Thomas Patrick Burke
- Language: English
- Subject: Justice; Social justice
- Published: 2011 (Continuum International)
- ISBN: 978-1441126733

The Concept of Justice: Is Social Justice Just? is a book on justice and social justice by Thomas Patrick Burke, published in 2011 by Continuum International. The book has received reviews from journals including The Journal of Politics, Cato Journal, and Modern Age, along with being widely cited in its field.

== See also ==
- The Major Religions, another book by Burke
