= Claire Renkin =

Australian art historian and academic

- Education: Rutgers University
- Occupations: art historian; academic
- Employer: University of Divinity
- Known for: Scholar specialising in the areas of art history and spirituality
- Website: staff.divinity.edu.au/staff/claire-renkin/

Claire Renkin is an Australian art historian and academic who has had a distinguished career as a scholar specialising in the areas of art history and spirituality.

== Education ==
Renkin studied English and a little art history at university, before working as a teacher in Melbourne. She later moved to the United States where she completed a Masters in Art History at the University of Massachusetts. In 1998, Renkin went on to complete her PhD in Art History at the University of Rutgers, the State University of New Jersey.

Her doctoral dissertation, titled The art of arousal in some religious paintings of Correggio was about an early 16th century northern Italian artist Antonio Correggio.

After teaching at the University of Massachusetts in Amherst, Renkin and her husband moved back to Melbourne in 1999. A meeting with Sr Maryanne Confoy RSC at a public lecture in Melbourne eventually led her to begin teaching at Yarra Theological Union (YTU) in 2001.

== Career ==
Renkin lectures in art history and spirituality at YTU, a member college of the University of Divinity which is located in Box Hill, Australia. She is currently the Department Head for YTU's Department of Christian Thought and History.

As well as teaching at YTU, Renkin also lectures regularly throughout Australia and supervises research on the intersection of art history, visual culture, theology and spirituality.

Her research and publications explore connections between gender, devotion, and changing concepts of holiness from the late Middle Ages.

In 2008 Renkin presented a paper on Images of the Magdalen in late Medieval Florence : visualising paradoxes of female sanctity, at a conference held at the State Library of Victoria in conjunction with The medieval imagination exhibition. The papers were later published in a volume titled Imagination, books & community in medieval Europe.

Renkin is currently working with Sr Angela Slattery I.B.V.M., to study fifty paintings depicting the life of Mary Ward (1585-1645), who was the founder of the Institute of the Virgin Mary, better known as the Sisters of Loreto.

The Global Church Project included Renkin in its list of "Australian and New Zealander Female Theologians you should get to know in 2020".

== Selected publications ==
=== Books ===
- Elvey, Anne; Hogan, Carol; Power, Kim and Renkin, Claire (2013) Reinterpreting the Eucharist: Explorations in Feminist Theology and Ethics. Equinox, Sheffield, UK. 217pp. ISBN 978-1-84553-771-5

=== Published articles ===
- Renkin, Claire (2015) An Art Historian Reflects on Modes of Visual Exegesis. Colloquium, 47 (1). pp. 158-161. ISSN 0588-3237

=== Book chapters ===
- Renkin, Claire (2016) A feast of love: visual images of Francis of Assisi and Mary Magdalen and late medieval mendicant devotion. In: Poverty and Devotion in Mendicant Cultures 1200-1450. Church, Faith and Culture in the Medieval West, eds. Mews, Constant J. and Welch, Anna E.. Routledge, New York, pp. 92-104. ISBN 978-14724-3732-7
- Renkin, Claire and Mews, Constant J. (2013) The Legacy of Gregory the Great in the Latin West. In: A Companion to Gregory the Great. Brill's Companions to the Christian tradition, eds. Neil, Bronwen and Dal Santo, Matthew. Brill, Leiden, pp. 315-342. ISBN 978-90-04-25775-7
- Renkin, Claire (2013) Real Presence: Seeing, Touching, Tasting: Visualising the Eucharist in Late Medieval Art. In: Reinterpreting the Eucharist: explorations in feminist theology and ethics. Equinox, London, pp. 131-151. ISBN 9781322198958
- Renkin, Claire (2010) Altera Magdalena? Clare as Sposa Chrisi and Mirror Imagery in a German Fifteenth-Century Life of St Clare. In: Interpreting Francis and Clare of Assisi. Broughton Publishing, Melbourne, Australia, pp. 255-270. ISBN 978-0-9806634-6-4
- Renkin, Claire (2009) Images of the Magdalen in late Medieval Florence : visualising paradoxes of female sanctity. In: Imagination, Books & Community in Medieval Europe : Papers of a Conference Held at the State Library of Victoria, Melbourne, Australia, 29-31 May, 2008 in Conjunction with an Exhibition "the Medieval Imagination", 28 March-15 June 2008. Kratzmann, G.C. Macmillan, South Yarra, Victoria. ISBN 9781921394331
- Renkin, Claire (2005) Pearls of Wisdom and Other Signs of Female Valour in Savoldo's Portrait of a Woman as St Margaret. In: Wisdom for Life. Australian Theological Forum Series (16), eds. O'Brien, Mark and Kelly, Michael A.. ATF, Hindmarsh. ISBN 9781920691295

=== Conference papers ===
- Renkin, Claire (2010) Images of the Magdalen in Late Medieval Florence: Visualizing Paradoxes of Female Sanctity. In: The Medieval Imagination, 29-31 May 2008, State Library of Victoria, Australia.
- Renkin, Claire (2008) Imagination, Books and Community in Medieval Europe. In: The Medieval Imagination, 29-31 May 2008, State Library of Victoria, Australia.
