= Wendy Mayer =

Australian academic (born 1960)

Wendy Mayer FAHA (born 1960) is an Australian scholar in late antiquity and religion who is a research professor and associate dean for research at Australian Lutheran College, dean of research strategy for the University of Divinity, and honorary research fellow at the University of South Africa. She is known for her work on John Chrysostom and on early Christian preaching.

== Education ==
Mayer graduated with a Bachelor of Arts from the University of Adelaide in 1979, and in 1991 she earned another Bachelor of Arts, with double honours in Latin and Greek, from the University of Queensland, where she also received the University Medal for excellence. In 1996, Mayer obtained her PhD in Studies in Religion from the University of Queensland.

== Career ==
Mayer was Australian Research Council (ARC) post doctoral research fellow (1998-2000), ARC QEII research fellow (2001-2005) and research fellow (2006-2016) at Australian Catholic University. She was a research fellow at Dumbarton Oaks, Harvard University, in 2006-2007, and a Visiting Researcher in the Center for the Study of Early Christianity at Catholic University of America (2004-2006, 2013-2016). In 2017 she became associate dean for research at Australian Lutheran College within the University of Divinity. In 2017 Mayer was appointed a professor at the same university, and in 2019 she was appointed part-time dean of research strategy there, commencing February 2020.

She has authored or co-authored six monographs and she has edited or co-edited volumes on John Chrysostom, Syrian Antioch, and religious conflict. She also maintains an online bibliography for research in Chrysostom studies.

Mayer has served on an editorial board for Writings from the Greco-Roman World (2006-2016). She is on the editorial board for the Byzantina Australiensia monograph series published by Brill and is co-founder and editor-in-chief of the Brill monograph series Critical Approaches to Early Christianity. She was co-founder and editor-in-chief, with Chris L. de Wet and Edwina Murphy, of the Patristics from the Margins series published by Brill Schöningh.

She is editor for the Lutheran Theological Journal, associate editor for the Journal of Early Christian Studies, and on the editorial boards for Studies in Late Antiquity (where she was founding member) and the Journal of Early Christian History (formerly Acta Patristica et Byzantina).

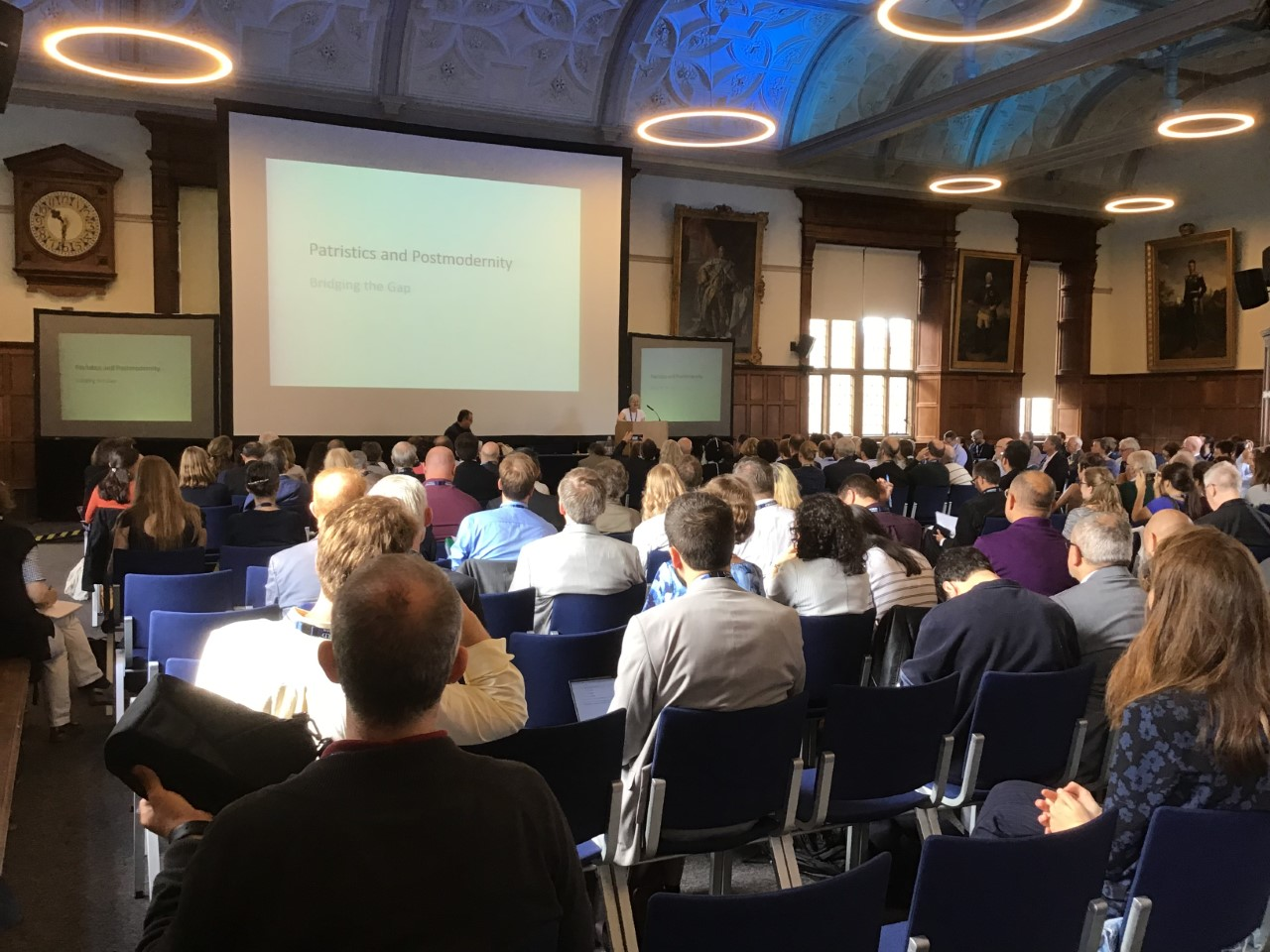
Wendy Mayer delivering her plenary address at the 18th International Conference on Patristic Studies, Examination Schools, University of Oxford 21 August 2019

Mayer spoke at the international conference Towards the Prehistory of the Byzantine Liturgical Year Festal Homilies and Festal Liturgies in Late Antique Constantinople, Regensburg, in July 2018, and gave keynote addresses at the Pacific Partnership in Late Antiquity conference, Auckland, in July 2018, APECSS conference, Okayama, September 2018, and The Role of Historical Reasoning in Religious Conflicts conference, Istituto Svizzero, Rome, October 2019. In August 2019, Mayer gave the plenary address at the 18th International Conference on Patristic Studies at Oxford University titled “Patristics and Postmodernity: Bridging the Gap”.

She deconstructed the traditional sources used for dating and sequence of Chrysostom's works, leading to a substantially revised chronology. This was followed up by a number of articles co-authored with Pauline Allen that challenged traditional notions of early Christian preaching. Sever J. Voicu, then scriptor graecus at the Biblioteca Apostolica Vaticana described the team of Allen and Mayer as a "ciclone australiano" (Australian cyclone) while in 2011, Alin Suciu described Allen and Mayer as "the two scholars from Australia who changed so much in our understanding of Chrysostom’s preaching activity". Mayer has since continued with studies on the continuing influence of Greek medical thought in late antiquity, religious violence and radicalisation, and the application of cognitive and neuroscience approaches to late antique studies.

== Honours ==
In 2015 Mayer was elected fellow in the classical studies / religion section of the Australian Academy of the Humanities, and in 2019 she was elected head of the academy's religion section.

== Selected publications ==
=== Books ===
- Mayer, Wendy; Allen, Pauline (2012). The Churches of Syrian Antioch (300-638 CE), Late Antique History and Religion 5. Leuven: Peeters. ISBN 9789042926042.
- Mayer, Wendy; Neil, Bronwen (2013). Religious Conflict from Early Christianity to the Rise of Islam, Arbeiten zur Kirchengeschichte 121. Berlin: DeGruyter. ISBN 9783110291780.
- Mayer, Wendy; Elmer, Ian (2014). Men and Women in the Early Christian Centuries, Early Christian Studies 18. Strathfield: St Pauls Publications. ISBN 9780980642865.
- Mayer, Wendy; Dunn, Geoffrey (2015). Christians Shaping Identity from the Roman Empire to Byzantium: Studies inspired by Pauline Allen, Supplements to Vigiliae Christianae 132. Leiden: Brill. ISBN 9789004298972.
- Mayer, Wendy; de Wet, Chris (2018). Reconceiving Religious Conflict: New Views from the Formative Centuries of Christianity, Routledge Studies in the Early Christian World. London: Routledge. ISBN 9781138229914.
- Mayer, Wendy; de Wet, Chris (2019). Revisioning John Chrysostom: New Approaches, New Perspectives, Critical Approaches to Early Christianity 1. Leiden: Brill. ISBN 9789004390034.

=== Chapters and journal articles ===
- (1998) 'John Chrysostom: Extraordinary Preacher, Ordinary Audience'. In P. Allen and M. Cunningham (eds), Preacher and Audience. Studies in Early Christian and Byzantine Homiletics. Leiden: Brill. 105–137.
- (2012). 'The topography of Antioch described in the writings of John Chrysostom’. In Catherine Saliou (ed.), Les sources de l’histoire du paysage urbain d’Antioche sur l’Oronte. Actes des journées d’études des 20 et 21 septembre 2010. Vincennes-Saint-Denis: Université Paris-8. 81–100.
- (2016). ’The Changing Shape of Liturgy: From earliest Christianity to the end of Late Antiquity’. In Teresa Berger and Bryan Spinks (eds), Liturgy's Imagined Past/s: Methodologies and Materials in the Writing of Liturgical History Today. Collegeville, MN: Liturgical Press. 275–302.
- (2016). 'Madness in the works of John Chrysostom: A snapshot from Late Antiquity’. In Hélène Perdicoyianni-Paléologou (ed.), The Concept of Madness from Homer to Byzantium: Manifestations and Aspects of Mental Illness and Disorder, Byzantinische Forschungen 32. Amsterdam : Verlag Adolf M. Hakkert. 349–373.
- (2017). 'A Life of Their Own. Preaching, Radicalisation, and the Early ps-Chrysostomica in Greek and Latin'. In F. P. Barone, C. Macé, and P. A. Ubierna (eds.), Philologie, herméneutique et histoire des textes entre Orient et Occident: Mélanges en hommage à Sever J. Voicu, Instrumenta Patristica et Mediaevalia 73. Turnhout: Brepols. 977-1004.
- (2018). ‘Preaching and listening in Latin? Start here’. In Anthony Dupont, Shari Boodts, Gert Partoens, and Johan Leemans eds), Preaching in the Patristic Era: Sermons, Preachers, and Audiences in the Latin West, A New History of the Sermon 6, Leiden: Brill. 11–27.
