= Maryanne Confoy =

Australian religious sister and academic

Sister Maryanne Confoy

Personal life
- Born: 15 April 1944 (age 82) Australia
- Known for: Scholar in the areas of ministry, pastoral theology and spirituality
- Occupation: academic; Religious sister

Religious life
- Religion: Catholicism
- Order: Sisters of Charity

Maryanne P. Confoy RSC (born 15 April 1944) is an Australian religious Sister of Charity who has also been a teacher and scholar, working primarily in the areas of ministry and spirituality.

== Early life and education ==
Maryanne Confoy was born on 15 April 1944. She joined the Sisters of Charity in Australia, an order established by Mary Aikenhead and whose members have been working in education, health and community care since they first arrived in Australia in 1838. Confoy completed a Bachelor of Arts from the University of Melbourne and went on to further postgraduate studies at Boston College and the Harvard Graduate School of Education. Confoy's doctoral degree in theology and education was undertaken at Boston College. Her PhD thesis, titled Adult faith development and Christian religious education was completed in 1981.

== Career ==
Confoy has been a visiting professor at the Institute of Religious Education and Pastoral Ministry at Boston College. She was Professor of Pastoral Theology at the Jesuit Theological College and the United Faculty of Theology, part of what is now the University of Divinity.

Confoy’s publications include articles on spirituality and ministry, a biography on Australian novelist Morris West, books on spirituality and the contemplative life, priesthood, religious life and Christian ministry. She co-edited a volume called Freedom and Entrapment: Women Thinking Theology, with Joan Nowotny and Dorothy A. Lee, which was published in 1995. After the publication of her book, Religious Life and Priesthood, she was interviewed by the Australian Broadcasting Corporation (ABC) for a program on The Future of Priests and Nuns. This publication examines the implementation of the Vatican II documents on priesthood, training of priests, and religious life, and offers a vision and contemporary critique for the contemporary church. In 2010 she was interviewed for another ABC program on Reading on Vocation: Nuns.

Confoy is on the board of St Vincent’s Health Australia, a role she was appointed to on 6 February 2012. Other governance roles have included member of the Australian Catholic University Senate and Chair of Melbourne College of Divinity Board of Postgraduate Studies. She has been a Council member of Edmund Rice Education Australia, a member of the St Vincent's Foundation Board, and joined the LUCRF Community Program in February 2015.

== Honours ==
Confoy was made a Fellow of the Melbourne College of Divinity (now University of Divinity) in 2006.

She was awarded the Ignatian Companions Medal at the Jesuit Province Gathering held on Wednesday 24 April 2019 in Sydney. This award acknowledged Confoy's contribution to the mission of the Society of Jesus in Australia and for advancing the mission and formation of Jesuits in Australia and in Boston.

The Global Church Project included Confoy in its list of Australian and New Zealander Female Theologians you should get to know in 2020.

In 2020 Confoy was recognised as a Distinguished Alumni Award Winner at the Boston College School of Theology and Ministry. Confoy was the first PhD graduate of the Institute of Religious Education and Pastoral Ministry at Boston College. The honour recognises Confoy's contribution to the life of the School through her teaching at the Summer Institute, and at STM's summer school.

== Selected publications ==
=== Books ===
- Confoy, Maryanne (2015) Welcome, Inclusion, Attentive Presence: The Central Role of Pastoral Care in Catholic Health and Aged Care. Catholic Health Australia, Canberra. ISBN 978-0-9578953-8-6
- Confoy, Maryanne (2008) Religious Life and Priesthood: Perfectae Caritatis, Optatum Totius, Presbyterorum Ordinis. Mahwah: Paulist Press. ISBN 978-0-8091-4454-9
- Confoy, Maryanne (2005), Morris West: Literary Maverick, John Wiley. ISBN 1740311191
- Confoy, Maryanne (1997), Morris West : a writer and a spirituality, HarperCollins Religious, ISBN 978-1-86371-712-0
- Confoy, Maryanne, Lee, Dorothy A. & Nowotny, Joan (eds) (1995) Freedom & entrapment : women thinking theology. Dove, North Blackburn, Vic. 978-1-86371-555-3

=== Published articles ===
- Confoy, Maryanne (2013) Religious Life in the Vatican II Era: 'State of Perfection' or a Living Charism? Theological Studies, 74 (2). pp. 321–346. ISSN 0040-5639
- Confoy, Maryanne (2010) "Consider, Take Counsel, and Speak Out" (Judges 19:30): Contemplative, Dialogical and Prophetic Dimensions of Christian Ministry. Pacifica, 23 (2). pp. 212–232. ISSN 1030-570X
- Confoy, Maryanne (2000) Women and the Meaning of Suffering. Pacifica, 13 (3). pp. 249–266. ISSN 1030-570X

=== Book chapters ===
- Confoy, Maryanne (2015) Religious Life in the Vatican II Era: State of Perfection of Living Charism? In: Fifty Years On: Probing the Riches of Vatican II. Michael Glazier Book, Liturgical Press, MN: Collegeville, pp. 391–418. ISBN 978-0-8146-83019
- Confoy, Maryanne (2009) Communities Visible and Invisible in Oceania. In: Calling for Justice throughout the World: Catholic Women Theologians on the HIV/AIDS Pandemic. Continuum, New York, pp. 167–174. ISBN 9780826428646
- Confoy, Maryanne (2009) Imagination: Catalyst for connectedness in theological Education for Ministry. In: Together in Ministry: Essays in honour of John Paver. Uniting Academic Press, Melbourne, pp. 85–98. ISBN 9780980580310
- Confoy, Maryanne (2007) Educating for Contextual Mission. In: Re-imagining God and Mission: Perspectives from Australia. ATF Press, Hindmarsh South Australia, pp. 235–252. ISBN 978-1920-6917-52
- Confoy, Maryanne (2003) Mysticism: God's Initiative and Our Response. In: Horizons & Hopes: The Future of Religious Education. Paulist Press, Mahwah. ISBN 080914154X
- Confoy, Maryanne (2002) The Contemporary Search For Meaning In Suffering. In: Spirituality and Palliative Care: Social and Pastoral Perspectives. Oxford University Press. ISBN 0195513525

== See also ==
- Sisters of Charity of Australia
