= Fiona Kumari Campbell =

Disability studies researcher and theorist

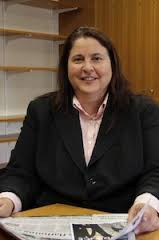
- Fiona Kumari Campbell
- Education: La Trobe University (BLS Hons, Law and Sociology); Queensland University of Technology (PhD, Sociology, Humanities, Law); Griffith University (Certificate in Higher Research Degree Supervision); MCD University of Divinity (Advanced Diploma in Theology, Systemic Theology, Catholic Liturgy, Buddhist Studies)
- Notable work: Published 'Contours of Ableism' (2009)

Fiona Kumari Campbell (born 1963) is a disability studies researcher and theorist, focusing on disability in relation to law, technology, advocacy, and desire. She is currently adjunct professor in Disability Studies with the Faculty of Medicine at the University of Kelaniya, Sri Lanka and a Distinguished Fellow, at the Paul Baerwald School of Social Work and Social Welfare at The Hebrew University of Jerusalem.

== Early life ==
Fiona Kumari Campbell was born in Melbourne, Australia, to a family of Scottish and Sri Lankan-Jewish descent and identifies as biracial/Asian. She is also known by her Hebrew name ‘Miryam-Ysrael Naomi’ Campbell. Her early ideas about difference and the politics of race were developed by her own early childhood experiences of growing up under Australia's White Australia policy and the treatment of her Asian mother. Although her father died at the age of 33 when Campbell was nine years old, his preoccupations with the Classics, theology, philosophy, and socialist politics left an indelible impression on her learning and understanding of the world. Campbell had an uneven education, leaving home at sixteen and eventually finishing her final Higher School Certificate at the Croydon High Evening School in 1980 under the tutelage of Dr. Norman W. Saffin, who also schooled Australian sociologist Peter Beilharz and Marxist-Feminist researcher Dr. Patricia Morrigan. Campbell is an incomplete quadriplegic and experiences other chronic illnesses.

== Education ==
She has focused on the consequences of discrimination and social oppression. Campbell is a scholar of disability studies, sociology, cultural studies, and legal theory, all of which can be found in much of her published cross-disciplinary research. Campbell's writing relates to issues of philosophy, Buddhism, disability, Sri Lankan disability, law, technology, and marginality.

Campbell attended La Trobe University between 1987 and 1998, where she received a 1st Class BLS (Hons) in Law and Sociology. In 1999, after being awarded an Australian Postgraduate Award (APA), she returned to university where she graduated with a PhD in Sociology, Humanities, and Law from Queensland University of Technology, under the supervision of Professor Gavin Kendall. Campbell went on to receive a Certificate in Higher Research Degree Supervision in 2005 from Griffith University and in 2014, she received an Advanced Diploma in Theology, Systematic Theology, Jewish Biblical Studies , and Buddhist Studies from MCD University of Divinity.

== Career ==
Campbell began her career as a shelter workshop employee before moving on to work in the community services sector, focusing on poverty and disability. She worked in the National Government's disability policy positions. Campbell briefly worked for the Australian Benedictine religious order, the Sisters of the Good Samaritan.

In 2003, Campbell joined Griffith University's Logan campus as the Convenor of the Disabilities Program in the School of Human Services and Social Work, which is considered to be Australia's largest postgraduate disability program. In 2009, Campbell published her first book, Contours of Ableism, before leaving school the following year. In 2011, she took up the position of Deputy Head (Learning and Teaching Scholarship) with the Griffith Law School, and worked as Associate Professor until June 2014. In 2016, Campbell joined the faculty of the School of Health and Wellbeing at the University of Southern Queensland and was appointed as the program director of human services.

Campbell has taught at several universities in Australia, such as Griffith University, Victoria University, University of Kelaniya, and Queensland University of Technology. She has taught on the subjects of human rights, diversity studies, sociology and law theory, and Australian politics and disability studies. Currently she is a Distinguished Fellow, at the Paul Baerwald School of Social Work and Social Welfare at The Hebrew University of Jerusalem.

In January 2017, Campbell joined the School of Social Work at the University of Dundee in Scotland. Due to issues around disability victimisation and antisemitism she retired from the university in July 2025 and established the Institute for Studies in Ableism. She has advised former Ministers of Community Services, Senator Don Grimes and Dr. Neil Blewitt, on the establishment of attendant care in Australia.

== Honours and awards ==
Campbell has received the D. M. Myers University Medal in 1998 by La Trobe University, the Deans' Medal (Faculty of Law & Management), the Jean Martin Prize in Sociology and the Blake, and the Dawson Waldron - 4th year Legal Studies Prize.

== Publications and bibliography ==
- Contours of Ableism, Fiona Kumari (2009) Griffith University, Australia
- Campbell Refusing Able(ness), Fiona Kumari Campbell (2008) M/C Journal
- Disability Studies Quarterly, Fiona Kumari Campbell (2005-06-15) Griffith University, Australia
- Litigation Neurosis: Pathological Responses or Rational Subversion? Fiona Kumari Campbell (2006) School of Human Services and Social Work, Griffith University
- The Case of Clint Hallam's Wayward Hand, Fiona Kumari Campbell(2003) Griffith University
- A Review of Disability Law and Legal Mobilisation in Sri Lanka, Fiona Kumari Campbell (2012-01-03) University of Kelaniya
- Listening & Voice: Encounters with Memory & the Politics of Regret, Fiona Kumari Campbell (2010-09-07) Griffith Law School
- Children in same-sex families, Fiona Kumari Campbell (2005) Pearson
- Geodisability knowledge: Watching for Global North imposions, Fiona Kumari Campbell (2005) School of Human Services and Social Work, Griffith University
- Mind the Gap! The Challenge of Widening Social Cleavages, Fiona Kumari Campbell (2012-12-18) Journal of Social Inclusion
