= Edith Amelia Kerr =

Church worker and women's rights advocate

- Born: 6 June 1893; Sandridge, Port Melbourne
- Died: 2 April 1975 (aged 81); Canterbury, Melbourne
- Occupation: Teacher

Edith Amelia Kerr (June 6, 1893 – April 2, 1975) was an Australian teacher, headmistress and Presbyterian missionary.

== Early and family life ==
Edith Amelia Kerr was born at Patyah near Edenhope, Victoria. She was the ninth of ten children born to Mary Taylor (née Gardiner) and her husband James Kerr.

Kerr trained as a teacher at the Melbourne Continuation School. In 1910, she passed the Public Service examinations at the University of Melbourne.

Kerr decided to become a missionary after the death of her fiancé in World War I. In 1920, she attended the Deaconess and Missionary Training Institute. In 1946, Kerr graduated with a Bachelor of Arts from the Melbourne College of Divinity.

== Career ==
Between 1921 and 1941, Kerr served as a missionary in Korea. She returned home after the Japanese occupation. During this time, Kerr was principal of the Tonyung Industrial School and founded a farm school for homeless women.

The Argus newspaper reported that Kerr would probably be the first woman ordained into the Presbyterian Church. However the acceptance of her candidature was the cause of contention and appeals within the presbyterian assembly. In 1946, during an address to the Presbyterian Women's Missionary Union, she said that "the majority of progressive men in the church were solidly behind the move" to ordain women.

Kerr was a teacher at Methodist Ladies College and Presbyterian Ladies' College.

== Publications ==
In 1949, Kerr published a book titled The Historic Place of Women in the Church.
