= Anne Elvey =

Australian academic and poet

- Occupations: poet; theologian

Academic background
- Education: University of Divinity, Monash University
- Thesis: Gestations of the sacred: ecological feminist readings from the Gospel of Luke (1999)

Academic work
- Discipline: Theology and Eco-Feminism
- Institutions: University of Divinity, Monash University
- Main interests: ecological poetics, ecological feminist hermeneutics, poetry and activism
- Website: https://redroompoetry.org/poets/anne-elvey/

Anne Frances Elvey is an Australian academic, editor, researcher and poet.

== Education ==
Elvey has completed at Bachelor of Science with Honours, a Graduate Diploma in Education (Secondary), a Bachelor of Theology, a Master of Theology and a Doctor of Philosophy.

Her Masters thesis, completed at the Melbourne College of Divinity (now University of Divinity) in 1994, was titled The fertility of God: a study of the characterizations of Pseudo-Philo's Hannah and Luke's Mary.

Her Doctoral thesis, awarded in 1999 from Monash University, Gestations of the sacred: ecological feminist readings from the Gospel of Luke, was the basis for the later publication, An Ecological Feminist Reading of the Gospel of Luke: A Gestational Paradigm. One reviewer of this book congratulated Elvey on her innovative approach and important contribution to Lukan scholarship.

== Career ==
Elvey lives and works on Boon Wurrung Country in Seaford, Victoria.

She is an Honorary Research Associate at Trinity College, Theological School, University of Divinity, and an Adjunct Research Fellow, School of Languages, Literatures, Cultures and Linguistics at Monash University, in Melbourne, Australia. Her research interests include ecological poetics, poetry and/as activism, ecological feminist hermeneutics, postcolonial biblical interpretation and political theology, and she has published widely in these areas.

Elvey was editor of Colloquium: The Australian and New Zealand Theological Review from May 2012 to May 2017 and president of the Fellowship for Biblical Studies in 2011.

The Global Church Project included Elvey in its list of 20 Australian and New Zealander Female Theologians you should get to know in 2020.

In addition to her academic publications, Elvey has also published several collections of poetry. She was the inaugurator and managing editor of Plumwood Mountain: An Australian Journal of Ecopoetry and Ecopoetics from 2013 to 2020. and editor-in-chief with Melbourne Poets’ Union, from 2016 to 2018.

Elvey edited the ebook Hope for whole: Poets Speak up to Adani. This book was the result of a Poets Speak up to Adani Day of Action in 2017, an event where poetry was used for 12 hours to protest the proposed Adani coal mine and its environmental consequences. The anthology was later recommended as a book that all Australian politicians should read.

Her poetry collection, Kin was shortlisted for the Kenneth Slessor Prize for Poetry in the New South Wales Premier's Literary Awards in 2015.

Elvey's’s chapbook, This flesh that you know was the winner of the international prize in the Overleaf Chapbook Manuscript Competition in 2015.

The book Intatto/Intact which she co-authored with Massimo D’Arcangelo and Helen Moore, was one of the first 30 volumes of environmental poetry donated to the Quarticciolo Library, as part of the European Festival of Environmental Poetry

== Select publications ==
=== Books ===
- Elvey, A. F. (2020) Reading the Magnificat in Australia: unsettling engagements. Sheffield: Sheffield Phoenix Press (Bible in the modern world, 75). ISBN 9781910928790
- Elvey, A. F., Dyer, K. D. and Guess, D. (eds) (2017) Ecological aspects of war: engagements with biblical texts. London, UK: Bloomsbury. ISBN 9780567676405
- Elvey, A. F., Dyer, K. D. and Guess, D. J. (2016) Ecological aspects of war: religious and theological perspectives. Hindmarsh, SA: ATF Theology. ISBN 9781925643206
- Hogan, C., Power, K. and Elvey, A. F. (eds) (2014) Reinterpreting the eucharist: explorations in feminist theology and ethics. London: Routledge (Gender, Theology and Spirituality). ISBN 9781317544081
- Elvey, A. and O'Brien, D. G. (eds) (2013) Climate change : cultural change: religious responses and responsibilities. Preston, Vic.: Mosaic Press. ISBN 9781743240526
- Elvey, A. F. (2011) Matter of the text: material engagements between Luke and the five senses. Sheffield, England: Sheffield Phoenix Press (Bible in the modern world, 37). ISBN 9781907534164
- Elvey, A. F. (2005) An ecological feminist reading of the Gospel of Luke: a gestational paradigm. Lewiston, N.Y.: Edwin Mellen Press (Studies in women and religion, v. 45). ISBN 9780889465497

=== Poetry ===
- Elvey, A. (2021) Obligations of voice. Canberra, ACT: Recent Work Press. ISBN 9780645008937
- Elvey, A. (2019) On arrivals of breath Montrose, VIC: Poetica Christi Press. ISBN 9780648248804
- Elvey, A. F. (2018) White on white. Carlton South, Victoria: Cordite Books. ISBN 9780975249291
- Intatto: ecopoesia = intact: ecopoetry. (2017) (co-author with Massimo D’Arcangelo and Helen Moore, eds) Prima edizione edn. Milano: La Vita Felice (Agape, 163). ISBN 9788893461900
- Elvey, A. F. (2014) Kin. Parkville, Vic.: Five Islands Press. ISBN 9780734048974
