= Paul Oslington =

Australian economist

- Born: 1965 (age 60–61)

Academic background
- Doctoral advisor: Andrew McGowan

Academic work
- Discipline: Economics

Paul Oslington (born 1965) is an Australian economist.

Inaugural Dean of Business and Professor of Economics at Alphacrucis University College in Sydney Australia. From 2008 to 2013 he was Professor of Economics at Australian Catholic University (ACU) where he held a joint appointment in the School of Business and School of Theology. From 2000 to 2008 Associate Professor of Economics at UNSW/ADFA.

== Overview ==
Paul Oslington is an international expert in the new interdisciplinary field of economics and religion. He has published a series of papers and books exploring the economic dimensions of theological ideas and church practice.

His work explores the way Christian theology has shaped the development of economics as a discipline in the 18th and 19th centuries, especially focusing on the role of natural theology. He argues that following from the Christian doctrines of creation and providence, we can learn what we can about God's character and activity through study of the natural world, including the study of human beings and their economic interactions. Our understanding of the relationship between economics and theology affects Christian ethics, especially the evaluation of markets and questions in business ethics.

Oslington has particularly considered the relationship between economics and theology in the writings of Adam Smith, but has also considered John Henry Newman, Max Weber, Jacob Viner and Bernard Lonergan as exemplars of fruitful ways of relating the disciplines.

He is also published in the areas of history and philosophy of economics, international trade theory, labour economics, and higher education policy.

== Biography ==
Paul Oslington studied at James Ruse Agricultural High School and Macquarie University before completing a Master of Economics/Econometrics with Honours and PhD in economics from the University of Sydney and a Bachelor of Divinity and Doctor of Theology from University of Divinity.

In addition to his main appointments he spent the 2020 academic year as a Resident Fellow at the Center of Theological Inquiry Princeton, and the 2006/7 academic year as a President's Visiting Scholar at Princeton Theological Seminary, with additional funding for a project in international economics at Princeton University. He previously held visiting fellowships in the Dept of Economics at University of Oxford in 2000 and University of British Columbia/Regent College Vancouver in 2003.

He is NSW Council member of the Economic Society of Australia, and a member of American Economic Association, History of Economic Thought Society of Australia, the Association of Christian Economists, and the American Academy of Religion.

His work has been supported by the Australian Research Council, the John Templeton Foundation and other funding bodies.
