= Janina Hiebel =

Australian academic and biblical scholar

- Born: 1979 (age 46–47); Germany
- Occupations: Academic, Biblical scholar

Academic background
- Education: Murdoch University (PhD); University of Divinity
- Thesis: The vision accounts in the Book of Ezekiel as interrelated narratives: A Redaction-critical and theological study (2013)
- Doctoral advisor: Suzanne Boorer

Academic work
- Discipline: Biblical Studies
- Institutions: Yarra Theological Union and Catholic Theological College, University of Divinity
- Main interests: Old Testament, The book of Ezekiel, and the period of the Babylonian Exile
- Website: https://staff.divinity.edu.au/staff/janina-hiebel/

Janina Hiebel (born 1979) is a German-born biblical scholar now residing in Australia who works at the University of Divinity in Melbourne, Australia. Her research interests are in the period of the Babylonian Exile, particularly the book of the prophet Ezekiel.

== Early life and education ==
Janina Maria Hiebel was born in Germany in 1979. She completed a degree in theology from the Otto-Friedrich University Bamberg in Germany in 2005, specialising in Old Testament studies. After moving to Australia, Hiebel completed her PhD at Murdoch University in Western Australia in 2014. Her doctoral thesis was titled: The vision accounts in the Book of Ezekiel as interrelated narratives: A Redaction-critical and theological study, and her supervisor was Suzanne Boorer. A book based on her doctoral thesis was subsequently published by De Gruyter in 2015 with the title Ezekiel’s Vision Accounts as Interrelated Narratives: A Redaction-Critical and Theological Study. In 2019 Hiebel completed a Graduate Certificate in Theological Education from the University of Divinity.

== Career ==
Heibel teaches at two colleges associated with the University of Divinity. Since 2015 she has taught Old Testament, Biblical Hebrew and Theological German at Yarra Theological Union and she has also been an adjunct lecturer in Biblical Studies at Catholic Theological College. Hiebel publishes in her areas of research specialisation, in particular on the book of the prophet Ezekiel and the period of the Babylonian Exile. Her most recent research explores how themes emerging from exilic biblical texts such as crisis and hope might have ongoing relevance in the modern world.

Heibel’s most recent publication, A Friendly guide to women in the Old Testament, is part of the Friendly Guide series published by Garratt Publishing. A reviewer of this volume, Associate Professor Mark A O’Brien op, states that Hiebel “provides a gripping read about women in the Old Testament that will challenge and transform a reader’s understanding of them”.

Hiebel is currently on the Executive of the Australian Catholic Biblical Association in the role of Secretary/Treasurer.

The Global Church Project included Hiebel in its list of "Australian and New Zealander Female Theologians you should get to know in 2020".

Heibel is a member of the Focolare Movement and lives in a Focolare community in Melbourne. The Movement, which promotes the spirituality of unity and is present in over 180 countries, was founded by Chiara Lubich (1920-2008). Heibel coordinates theological education and formation for other Focolare members in Melbourne and the wider Oceanic region.

== Publications ==
- A Friendly Guide to Women in the Old Testament. (2021) Garratt Publishing. ISBN 9781922484239 https://nla.gov.au/anbd.bib-an69900926
- “Hope in Exile: In Conversation with Ezekiel.” Religions 8 (2019): 476–76. https://doi.org/10.3390/rel10080476.
- "Redaction, Rhetoric, and a New Beginning in Ezekiel 1:1–3:15." (2016) Australian Biblical Review 64: 13–23. https://trove.nla.gov.au/work/234308747.
- Ezekiel's vision accounts as interrelated narratives: a redaction-critical and theological study. (2015) Berlin: De Gruyter (Beihefte zur Zeitschrift für die alttestamentliche Wissenschaft, volume 475). https://doi.org/10.1515/9783110406658 ISBN 9783110403640
- “Visions of Death and Re-Creation: Ezekiel 8-11, 37:1-14 and the Crisis of Identity in the Babylonian Exile and Beyond.” (2015) Pacifica : Journal of the Melbourne College of Divinity 28, no. 3: 243–55. https://doi.org/10.1177/1030570X16666304.
