= The Major Religions =

Textbook on religions and religious texts

The Major Religions: An Introduction with Texts
- Author: Thomas Patrick Burke
- Language: English
- Subject: Religion
- Genre: Textbook
- Published: 1996 (Blackwell); 2004 (Blackwell)
- ISBN: 978-1-55786-714-8

The Major Religions: An Introduction with Texts is a textbook on religions and religious texts by Thomas Patrick Burke, first published in 1996 by Blackwell, with a second edition published in 2004. The book has received reviews from journals including Pacifica and Religious Studies Review, along with being cited in its field and in use by educational institutions.

== Table of contents ==
- Part I: The Religions of Indian Origin
  - 1. Hinduism. Hinduism Texts.
  - 2. Buddhism. Buddhism Texts.
  - 3. Sikhism. Sikhism Texts.
- Part II: The Religions of Chinese Origin
  - 4. Traditional Chinese Religion and Confucianism. Confucianism Texts.
  - 5. Taoism. Taoism Texts.
  - 6. Chinese Buddhism. Chinese Buddhism Texts.
- Part III: The Religions of Semitic Origin
  - 7. Judaism. Israelite Religion. Rabbinic Judaism. Judaism Texts.
  - 8. Islam. Islam Texts.
  - 9. Christianity. Christianity Texts.

== See also ==
- The Concept of Justice: Is Social Justice Just?, another book by Burke
