= Andrew McGowan =

Theology professor and Anglican priest (born 1961)

The Very Reverend Andrew McGowan
- Born: Andrew Brian McGowan; 17 August 1961 (age 65); Melbourne, Victoria, Australia
- Title: Dean and President of Berkeley Divinity School (2014-2026)

Ecclesiastical career
- Religion: Christianity (Anglican)
- Church: Anglican Church of Australia
- Ordained: 1986 (deacon); 1986 (priest)
- Offices held: Canon of St Paul's Cathedral, Melbourne (2007–2014)

Academic background
- Education: University of Western Australia; Trinity College Theological School; University of Notre Dame
- Thesis: To Gather the Fragments (1996)
- Doctoral advisor: Harold W. Attridge

Academic work
- Discipline: Theology
- Sub-discipline: Historical theology
- Institutions: University of Notre Dame Australia; Episcopal Divinity School; Trinity College Theological School; University of Melbourne; Yale University
- Doctoral students: Paul Oslington
- Website: abmcg.blogspot.com

Andrew Brian McGowan (born 17 August 1961) is an Australian scholar of early Christianity and an Anglican priest. He served as the McFaddin Professor of Anglican Studies at Yale Divinity School and dean and president of the Berkeley Divinity School at Yale from 2014 to 2026.

Prior to appointment at Berkeley and Yale he was the seventh warden of Trinity College (University of Melbourne) (2007–2014) and Joan F. W. Munro Professor of Historical Theology in the Trinity College Theological School, Melbourne within the University of Divinity.

== Early life and education ==
McGowan was born on 17 August 1961 in Melbourne, moving to Perth as a teenager. He attended Christ Church Grammar School in Perth and was an early member of the music group that became the Triffids. He then studied classics and ancient history at the University of Western Australia (BA Hons 1983). He studied theology at Trinity College (BD Hons 1986) in Melbourne. After ordination he served a curacy in Como/Manning before appointment as rector of Forrestfield in 1988. He then undertook doctoral studies in Christianity and Judaism in Antiquity at the University of Notre Dame in Indiana, United States (MA, PhD, 1996), where he was supervised by Harold W. Attridge. His thesis was titled To Gather the Fragments: The Social Significance of Food and Drink in Early Christian Ritual Meals, and published in revised form by the Clarendon Press at Oxford in its Oxford Early Christian Studies series as Ascetic Eucharists: Food and Drink in Early Christian Ritual Meals.

== Career ==
On his return to Australia in 1996, McGowan was lecturer in New Testament and Early Christianity at the University of Notre Dame Australia in Fremantle. In 1998 he was appointed assistant professor in Early Christian History at the Episcopal Divinity School in Cambridge, Massachusetts, being promoted to associate professor in 1999.

He returned to Trinity College as director of its theological school in 2003. After serving as acting warden in 2005 and 2006, he was appointed the seventh warden of Trinity College in January 2007. In October 2012, he was elected one of the ten foundation professors of the MCD University of Divinity, Australia’s first specialist university. During this time he was a member of the chapter (i.e., canon) of St Paul's Cathedral, Melbourne, and a clerical member of the General Synod of the Anglican Church of Australia.

In July 2014, McGowan returned to the United States to succeed Joseph H. Britton in the post of dean and president of the Berkeley Divinity School at Yale and Associate Dean for Anglican Studies at Yale Divinity School. He was also appointed J. L. Caldwell McFaddin and Rosine B. McFaddin Professor of Anglican Studies by the president and fellows of Yale University from July 2014.

McGowan was editor of the Journal of Anglican Studies from 2013 to 2020.

== Research ==
McGowan's research interests centre on ancient Christianity, especially the Eucharist, sacrifice, food and meals in antiquity, early North African Christianity, and on Anglican theology. He has also been a commentator on aspects of higher education and religion in contemporary society, including in the Washington Post, USA Today, The Age, The Australian, The Conversation, ABC's The Drum, the news column of the Biblical Archaeology Society called "Bible History Daily" and SkyNews. He is a Christian socialist.

== Select publications ==
- Seven Last Words: Creation and Cross (Portland, Oregon: Cascade), 2021. ISBN 9781725298255
- (editor) William Palmer Ladd, Prayer Book Interleaves: Some Reflections on How the Book of Common Prayer Might Be Made More Influential in Our English-Speaking World (Wipf and Stock, 2018) ISBN 9781532664342
- Ancient and Modern: Anglican Essays on the Bible, the Church, and the World (Portland, Oregon and Melbourne, Australia: Wipf & Stock, and Morning Star), 2015. ISBN 9781498230988
- Ancient Christian Worship: Early Church Practices in Social, Historical, and Theological Perspective (Grand Rapids: Baker Academic, 2014). ISBN 9780801097874
  - Italian translation as Il Culto Cristiano dei Primi Secoli (Bologna: Dehoniane, 2019) ISBN 9788810416488
- Method and Meaning: Essays on New Testament Interpretation in Honor of Harold W. Attridge, ed. Andrew B. McGowan and Kent Harold Richards (Leiden: Brill Academic, 2012) ISBN 9789004219700
- God in Early Christian Thought: Essays in Memory of Lloyd G. Patterson ed. Andrew B. McGowan, Tim Gaden, and Brian E. Daley (Leiden: Brill, 2009). ISBN 9789004174122
- Ascetic Eucharists: Food and Drink in Early Christian Ritual Meals (Oxford: Clarendon, 1999) ISBN 9780198269724

== See also ==
- Anglican Diocese of Perth

Academic offices
Preceded by Donald Markwell	Warden of Trinity College, Melbourne; 2007–2014	Succeeded by Campbell P. Bairstow
Preceded by Joseph H. Britton	Dean and President of Berkeley Divinity School; 2014–present	Incumbent
