= Lilian Scholes =

Australian Methodist preacher and theologian

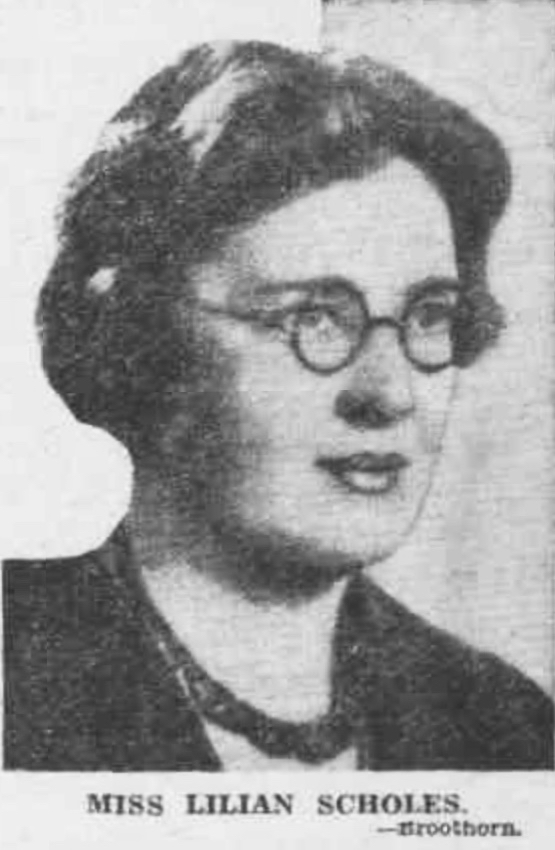
- Lilian Scholes in 1934
- Born: Lilian Lelean Scholes; 14 May 1902; Northcote, Victoria
- Died: November 7, 1972 (aged 70); Mont Albert, Victoria
- Occupations: Methodist preacher, theologian author
- Notable work: First woman to graduate with the degree of Bachelor of Divinity from the Melbourne College of Divinity

Lilian Lelean Scholes (14 May 1902 - 7 November 1972) was a Methodist preacher, theologian and author in Melbourne, Australia who in 1934 was the first woman to graduate with the degree of Bachelor of Divinity (Honours) from the Melbourne College of Divinity.

== Early life and education ==
Lilian Lelean Scholes was born on 14 May 1902 in Northcote, Victoria to Samuel and Clara (Lelean) Scholes. Her maternal grandfather and uncle were Methodist ministers in Australia and Fiji, and her father, also a Methodist minister, was President of the Methodist Conference of Australasia in 1917.

She attended Melbourne High School and studied for a Bachelor of Arts and Master of Arts from the University of Melbourne. She also held a Diploma in Education and was registered as a teacher in Victoria in 1926. She worked as a secondary school teacher, including two years of teaching in a mission school in Fiji.

In 1934 she graduated with the degree of Bachelor of Divinity (Honours) from the Melbourne College of Divinity. Only one woman, Winifred Kiek, had previously completed the BD at the MCD, but Scholes was the first woman to complete the degree with honours. Her aim was to attain the MCD's highest award, the Doctor of Divinity, although this never eventuated.

== Career ==
Scholes was a local preacher in the Methodist Church, and worked for the Methodist Home Mission Society. She intended to seek ordination to the ministry, however this was not permitted by the Methodist Church and she had to relinquish this path following the Methodist Conference which in 1935 decided not to open ordination for women. Scholes' own view was that ordination should be restricted to unmarried women, and that a high standard of education was required for either men or women to be considered for the ministry.

She continued to minister as a local preacher throughout the 1940s and 1950s, earning a living as a teacher at the Austral Coaching College in Melbourne. She authored over two dozen books or pamphlets including biblical, theological and historical studies, and a book John Wesley's Silver Buckles (1967) on the origins of Methodism and the Lelean family history.

== Death ==
She died on 7 November 1972 at Mont Albert, Victoria aged 70 and her remains were interred at Springvale.
