= Mary L. Coloe =

Australian religious sister and biblical scholar (born 1949)

Sister Mary L. Coloe

Personal life
- Born: 1949 (age 76–77) Australia

Religious life
- Religion: Roman Catholicism

Sister Mary Coloe (born 1949) is an Australian religious sister and New Testament biblical scholar who specializes in the Gospel of John. She is a member of the Sisters of the Presentation of the Virgin Mary, a Roman Catholic religious order dedicated to teaching and service to the poor. She is a professor at Yarra Theological Union, in Box Hill, Victoria, Australia.

== Biography ==
Mary L. Coloe began her teaching career in primary and secondary education. She is a Presentation Sister. Founded by the venerable Nano Nagle, who was dedicated to educating poor children in Ireland, the Sisters of the Presentation of the Virgin Mary is a Roman Catholic order for women with a focus on teaching in primary and secondary schools. The Presentation Sisters first came to Australia in 1866.

In the late 1990s, she decided to pursue a doctorate of theology. She attended the Australian Catholic University, studying with the biblical scholar Francis J. Moloney, an expert in Johannine literature. Her dissertation was a study of temple imagery in the Gospel of John; it was later published as God Dwells With Us: Temple Symbolism in the Fourth Gospel. She completed her DTh in 1999.

After gaining her degree, she taught biblical studies at the Australian Catholic University for over twenty years; by 2013 she was an associate professor. She also has taught at St. Paul's Seminary in Brisbane. Since 2014, she has taught New Testament studies at Yarra Theological Union, located in Box Hill, Victoria, which is part of the University of Divinity in Australia. Her areas of expertise are New Testament studies and biblical languages. She was appointed a full professor at the University of Divinity in 2020.

In 2013, Coloe was appointed to a team of Roman Catholics participating in bilateral dialogue with the Christian Church (Disciples of Christ), through the Pontifical Commission for the Promotion of Christian Unity. These bilateral dialogues have been occurring for many years, since Vatican II, in a series of phases. Coloe participated in the fifth phase, from 2013 to 2018, which focused on the theme of the presence of Christ in the eucharist. There were six meetings, culminating in a final report released in 2018.

== Biblical scholarship ==
As a biblical scholar, Coloe has examined christological and ecclesial themes in the Gospel of John. Her first book, based on her PhD thesis, was published in 2001, and is entitled God Dwells with Us: Temple Symbolism in the Fourth Gospel. In this text, she examines the use of temple imagery in the Gospel of John. Many biblical scholars date the writing of the Gospel of John, known as the fourth gospel, after 70 CE, when the destruction of the Jewish temple in Jerusalem occurred. Coloe argues that the author of the Gospel of John portrays Jesus as the new temple, or "locus of God's dwelling", replacing the now-destroyed physical temple. After Jesus' ascension, the community of believers, known by scholars as the Johannine community, is portrayed as the new place of God's dwelling.

In her second book, Dwelling in the Household of God, Coloe continues to develop the ideas from her first book. She argues that the concept of "the household of God" is a key theme within the fourth gospel, one that is used intentionally to identify the new Johannine community. She uses the idea of "parmoiasis (double-vision or two realities)" to explore the ways that passages related to this theme have double meanings. Looking at the various relationships between people in the narrative, she explores the way these relationships reflect a household, and how the text may have instructed the new community in their development. Francis Moloney, in his review of the book, described it as "an imaginative and provocative study." In other reviews, the book has been praised for offering some important new perspectives on Johannine ecclesiology.

In 2021, Coloe's two-volume commentary on John will be published as part of the Wisdom Commentary series. Volume 1, "John 1-10", received an honourable mention in the Catholic Media Association (USA) awards in the Scripture:Academic Studies category.

== Works ==
- Coloe, Mary L. God Dwells With Us: Temple Symbolism in the Fourth Gospel. Collegeville, MN: Liturgical Press, 2001. ISBN 9780814659526
- Coloe, Mary L. Dwelling in the Household of God: Johannine Ecclesiology and Spirituality. Collegeville, MN: Liturgical Press, 2007. ISBN 0814659888
- Coloe, Mary L. Friendly Guide to John's Gospel. Garrett Publishing, 2012. ISBN 1921946326
- Chennattu, Rekha M., Mary Coloe and Francis J. Moloney, eds. Transcending boundaries : contemporary readings of the New Testament : essays in honor of Francis J. Moloney. Rome: Libreria Ateneo Salesiano, 2005. ISBN 8821305651
- Coloe, Mary L. and Tom Thatcher, eds. John, Qumran, and the Dead Sea Scrolls: Sixty Years of Discovery and Debate. Society of Biblical Literature, 2011. ISBN 1589835468
