= Dorothy Lee (theologian) =

Australian theologian

Dorothy Ann Lee AM FAHA (born 1953) is an Australian theologian and Anglican priest, formerly dean of the Trinity College Theological School, Melbourne, a college of the University of Divinity, and continuing as Frank Woods Distinguished Professor of New Testament. Her main research interests include the narrative and theology of the Gospels, particularly the Gospel of John, spirituality in the New Testament, the Transfiguration and Anglican worship.

== Early life ==
Lee was born in Scotland. Her father was a Presbyterian minister and her childhood was shared between the United Kingdom and Australia. She studied classics at the University of Newcastle, New South Wales, graduating BA (Hons) in 1975 before completing a BD (Hons) in 1984 and a PhD in 1991 at the University of Sydney. She was ordained as a minister of the Uniting Church in Australia in 1984 before being received into the Anglican Church of Australia in 2008.

== Academic career ==
Between 1983 and 1989, Lee lectured in New Testament at the University of Sydney and the United Theological College in Sydney. She then moved to Melbourne as lecturer at the Uniting Church Theological Hall, being appointed professor of New Testament in 1994. From 1998 to 2008 she also held the position of dean of chapel at Queen's College (University of Melbourne). After becoming an Anglican, Lee was appointed as lecturer at the Trinity College Theological School in 2008, becoming its dean in 2011.

Lee has acted as president of the Fellowship for Biblical Studies and is a member of the Doctrine Commission of the Anglican Church of Australia. She also holds an adjunct title of senior fellow in classics in the School of Historical Studies at the University of Melbourne.

In October 2012, Lee was elected one of the 10 foundation professors of the MCD University of Divinity, Australia's first specialist university. In October 2014 she was elected a canon of St Paul's Cathedral, Melbourne. She was elected a fellow of the Australian Academy of the Humanities in 2015.

Lee was appointed a Member of the Order of Australia in the 2024 Australia Day Honours for "significant service to the Anglican Church of Australia".

Lee is the sister of Australian composer Ruth Lee Martin.

== Selected works ==
=== Books ===
- Lee, Dorothy A. (1994). The Symbolic Narratives of the Fourth Gospel: The Interplay of Form and Meaning. Journal for the Study of the New Testament., Supplement Series. Vol. 95. Sheffield: Sheffield Academic Press. ISBN 9781850754688. OCLC 850888432.
- ——— (2002). Flesh and Glory: Symbol, Gender and Theology in the Gospel of John. New York: Crossroad.
- ——— (2011). Hallowed in Truth and Love: Spirituality in the Johannine Literature. Melbourne: Mosaic Press.
- ——— (2021). The Ministry of Women in the New Testament: Reclaiming the Biblical Vision for Church Leadership. Grand Rapids: Baker Academic.

=== Articles and chapters ===
- ——— (1998). "Touching the Sacred Text: The Bible as Icon in Feminist Reading". Pacifica. 11 (3): 249–64. doi:10.1177/1030570X9801100302. S2CID 170721218.
- ——— (1999). "Goddess Religion and Women's Spirituality: A Christian Feminist Response". Theology. 102: 19–28. doi:10.1177/0040571X9910200104. S2CID 170797723.
- ——— (1999). "The Symbol of Divine Fatherhood". Semeia. 85: 177–87.
- ——— (2001). "The Heavenly Woman and the Dragon: Re-readings of Revelation 12". In Devlin-Glass, Frances; McCredden, Lyn (eds.). Feminist Poetics of the Sacred: Creative Suspicions. Oxford: Oxford University Press. pp. 198–220.
- ——— (2003). "Feminist Theology". In Houlden, James L. (ed.). Jesus in History, Thought, and Culture: An Encyclopedia. Vol. 1. Santa Barbara: ABC Clio. pp. 281–88.
- ——— (2004). "Carnal Theology? Symbol and Incarnation in The Gospel of John". Women-Church: An Australian Journal of Feminist Studies in Religion. 34: 19–25. Digitised version of no. 34 (2004) available on JSTOR Open Community Collections, University of Divinity Digital Collections, Mannix Library.
- ——— (2004). "In the Spirit of truth': Worship and Prayer in the Gospel of John and the Early Fathers". Vigiliae Christianae. 58 (3): 277–97. doi:10.1163/1570072041718692.
- ——— (2008). "The Gospel of John: Symbol and Prologue". Conversations. 2.
- ——— (2010). "The Gospel of John and the Five Senses". Journal of Biblical Literature. 129 (1): 115–127. doi:10.2307/27821008. JSTOR 27821008.
- ——— (2010). "The Gospel of John". In Gaventa, Beverly Roberts; Petersen, David L. (eds.). The New Interpreter's One–volume Bible Commentary. Nashville: Abingdon. pp. 709–734.
- ——— (2012). "An Anglo-Uniting Perspective: The Journey Taken". In Lindsay, Elaine; Scarfe, Janet (eds.). " Preachers, Prophets and Heretics: Anglican Women's Ministry. Sydney: University of NSW Press. pp. 253–68.
