= University of Divinity =

Collegiate university in Australia

Coordinates: 37°48′20.27″S 145°02′12.20″E

- Badge
- Former name: Melbourne College of Divinity (1910–2011)
- Type: Collegiate theological university
- Established: 1910; 116 years ago
- Accreditation: TEQSA
- Religious affiliation: Christian denominations
- Budget: A$14.3 million (2023)
- Chancellor: Graeme Blackman
- Vice-Chancellor: James McLaren
- Total staff: 316 (2023)
- Students: 1,308 (2023)
- Undergraduates: 462 (2023)
- Postgraduates: 732 coursework (2023); 78 research (2023)
- Location: Melbourne, Adelaide, Brisbane, Sydney and Perth, Australia
- Campus: National collegiate with multiple sites
- Colours: Red Gold
- Website: divinity.edu.au

The University of Divinity is an Australian collegiate university with a specialised focus in divinity and associated disciplines. It is constituted by twelve theological colleges from seven denominations and three schools. The University of Divinity is the direct successor of the second oldest degree-granting authority in the State of Victoria, the Melbourne College of Divinity. The university's chancery and administration are located in Box Hill, a suburb of Melbourne in the state of Victoria.

The Melbourne College of Divinity was constituted by an act of the Parliament of Victoria, the Melbourne College of Divinity Act 1910 (1 Geo. V. No. 2275). The act was amended in 1956, (Note: Melbourne College of Divinity (Amendment) Act 1956 (No. 5956)) 1972, (Note: Melbourne College of Divinity Act 1972 (No. 8335)) 1979, (Note: Melbourne College of Divinity Act 1979 (No. 9325)) 1990, (Note: Melbourne College of Divinity (Amendment) Act 1990 (No. 23 of 1990)) 2005 (Note: Melbourne College of Divinity (Amendment) Act 2005 (No. 54 of 2005)) and 2016 (Note: Melbourne College of Divinity Amendment Act 2016 (No. 61 of 2016)) and is now known as the University of Divinity Act 1910. From its beginnings the college was a self-accrediting issuer of degrees, while not becoming a university until 2011. Representatives appointed by several churches formed the college to provide tertiary level theological education. The first president was the Right Reverend Henry Lowther Clarke, Anglican Archbishop of Melbourne, and the first registrar was the Reverend John Mathew, Moderator of the Presbyterian Church of Victoria.

In 2010, the Melbourne College of Divinity applied to the Victorian Regulation and Qualifications Authority for approval to operate as a self-accrediting "Australian University of Specialisation" (a category of higher education provider). The Victorian government announced on 30 August 2011 that the application had been approved and on 1 January 2012 the college began operating as a university. Peter Sherlock was appointed the inaugural vice-chancellor in April 2012. In May 2019 TEQSA extended the seven-year licence to operate as a university for an additional three years to the maximum possible of ten years before a review. On 1 July 2021, TEQSA changed the provider category of University of Divinity from Australian University of Specialisation to Australian University, with self-accrediting authority in the broad field of Society and Culture’.

In the 2022 Student Experience Survey, the University of Divinity recorded the highest student satisfaction rating out of every Australian university, with an overall satisfaction rating of 91.

== Governance and structure ==
=== Affiliated colleges ===
The colleges of the University of Divinity are:

- Australian Lutheran College, Adelaide, South Australia
- Eva Burrows College, in Ringwood, Victoria; Training college of the Salvation Army in Australia
- Catholic Theological College, East Melbourne, Victoria. A federation of autonomous seminaries:
  - Corpus Christi College
  - St Mary's Seminary
  - Salesian Theological College
  - St Joseph of Cupertino Friary (Conventual Franciscan)
  - St Dominic's Priory (Dominican)
- Pilgrim Theological College, Uniting Church
- St Athanasius College, Donvale and Melbourne, Victoria
- St Barnabas College, Adelaide (Anglican)
- St Francis College, Brisbane (Anglican)
- Trinity College Theological School (Anglican)
- Uniting College for Leadership and Theology, the Uniting Church South Australia from January 2023
- Whitley College, Parkville, Victoria. The Baptist theological college of Victoria.
- Yarra Theological Union, Box Hill, Victoria. Comprises the following religious institutes:
  - Blessed Sacrament Congregation
  - Divine Word Missionaries
  - Discalced Carmelites
  - Franciscans (OFM)
  - Missionaries of the Sacred Heart
  - Pallottines
  - Passionists
  - Redemptorists
- Wollaston College, Mt Claremont, Perth, Western Australia.

==== Past members ====
- Evangelical Theological Association, a cooperative venture between Whitley College and Stirling Theological College.
- Jesuit College of Spirituality, Parkville, Victoria. The Jesuit Province theological college which joined the Australian Catholic University.
- Morling College, Macquarie Park, New South Wales. The Baptist theological college of New South Wales.
- Stirling Theological College, Mulgrave, Victoria. The Churches of Christ national theological college.
- United Faculty of Theology, Parkville. Victoria until December 2014, a co-operative venture of the Anglican, Jesuit and Uniting theological colleges.

The three schools associated with the University are: the School of Indigenous Studies, the School of Graduate Research, and the School of Professional Practice.

== Affiliated churches ==
=== In 1910 ===
- Church of England
- Baptist
- Congregational
- Methodist
- Presbyterian

=== Present ===
- Anglican
- Baptist
- Churches of Christ
- Coptic Orthodox
- Lutheran
- Roman Catholic
- Salvation Army
- Uniting Church in Australia

== Courses ==
The University of Divinity offers awards in theology, philosophy, counselling, ministry, leadership and professional supervision.

- Undergraduate Certificate in Divinity
- Diploma in Ministry
- Diploma in Theology
- Advanced Diploma in Philosophy
- Advanced Diploma in Theology and Ministry
- Bachelor of Counselling
- Bachelor of Ministry
- Bachelor of Theology
- Graduate Certificate in Divinity
- Graduate Certificate in Education and Theology
- Graduate Certificate in Leadership
- Graduate Certificate in Professional Supervision
- Graduate Certificate in Research Methodology
- Graduate Certificate in Spirituality
- Graduate Certificate in Teaching Religious Education
- Graduate Certificate in Theology
- Graduate Diploma in Divinity
- Graduate Diploma in Pastoral and Spiritual Care
- Graduate Diploma in Philosophy
- Graduate Diploma in Professional Supervision
- Graduate Diploma in Spiritual Direction
- Graduate Diploma in Spirituality
- Graduate Diploma in Theology
- Master of Divinity
- Master of Education and Theology
- Master of Pastoral and Spiritual Care
- Master of Philosophical Studies
- Master of Philosophy
- Master of Spiritual Direction
- Master of Spirituality
- Master of Theological Studies
- Master of Theology
- Doctor of Ministry
- Doctor of Philosophy
- Doctor of Professional Practice

== Academic profile ==
In 2001 the institution was listed as a Schedule 1 Higher Education Institution by the Australian Government Department of Education, Science and Training. It receives federal funding for research, Australian Postgraduate Research Awards and International Postgraduate Research Scholarships.

The Higher Education Support Act (2003) (HESA 2003) listed the institution as a Table B (Private, Self-regulating) Higher Education Provider, which allowed its students to access federally funded loans under the FEE-HELP scheme.

=== Libraries and collections ===
Students at the university have access and borrowing rights to a number of library collections including the Mannix Library at Catholic Theological College, Geoffrey Blackburn Library at Whitley College, the Leeper and Mollison Libraries at Trinity College Theological School, as well as the Dalton McCaughey Library, the Patrick Murphy Memorial Library, the Redemptorist Seminary Library, the Dominican Studium Library, the St Pashcal Library and the Sugden Collection at Queen's College.

=== Research and publications ===
- Pacifica, an academic journal (1988–2017)

=== Student outcomes ===
The Australian Government's QILT (Note: Abbreviation for Quality Indicators for Learning and Teaching.) conducts national surveys documenting the student life cycle from enrolment through to employment.

In the 2023 Employer Satisfaction Survey, graduates of the university had an overall employer satisfaction rate of 87.1%.

In the 2023 Graduate Outcomes Survey, graduates of the university had a full-time employment rate of 77.8% for undergraduates and 94.6% for postgraduates.

In the 2023 Student Experience Survey, undergraduates at the university rated the quality of their entire educational experience at 89.8% meanwhile postgraduates rated their overall education experience at 89.2%.

== Notable people ==
- Andrew McGowan
- Anne Elvey
- Barbara Thiering
- Cathy Ross
- Charles Sherlock
- Claire Renkin
- Colleen O'Reilly
- Dorothy Ann Lee
- Edith Amelia Kerr
- Elizabeth Boase
- Fiona Kumari Campbell
- Greg Homeming
- Helen Carboon
- Hilda May Abba
- Janette Gray
- Janina Hiebel
- Joan Nowotny
- Anne Pattel-Gray
- Kate Prowd
- Katharine Massam
- Kathleen Williams
- Kay Goldsworthy
- Lilian Scholes
- Marita Munro
- Mark Stuart Edwards
- Mary L. Coloe
- Maryanne Confoy
- Paul Oslington
- Peter Corney
- Richard Divall
- Ruth Redpath
- Sarah Macneil
- Wendy Mayer
- Winifred Kiek

== See also ==
- List of universities in Australia
