= Australian Biblical Review =

- Language: English
- Edited by: Anne Gardner, Keith Dyer

Publication details
- History: 1951-present
- Publisher: Fellowship for Biblical Studies (Australia)
- Frequency: Annually

Standard abbreviations
- ISO 4: Aust. Biblic. Rev.

Indexing
- ISSN: 0045-0308
- LCCN: 64006369
- OCLC no.: 1779549

Links
- Journal homepage

The Australian Biblical Review is an annual peer-reviewed academic journal in the field of biblical studies. It was established in 1951.

The journal is published each October by the Fellowship for Biblical Studies and aims to provide a forum for biblical scholarly research across the international community.

An online repository of articles from older issues is to be made available by BiblicalStudies.org.uk.

== Abstracting and indexing ==
The journal is abstracted and indexed in the ATLA Religion Database.
