= Pilgrim Theological College =

- Established: 2015
- Head of College: Philip Hughes (acting)
- Location: Melbourne, Australia; 37.792°S 144.960°E
- Website: pilgrim.edu.au

Pilgrim Theological College is an Australian theological college and a member college of the University of Divinity. It is part of the Uniting Church in Australia Synod of Victoria and Tasmania's Centre for Theology & Ministry.

== Overview and history ==
Pilgrim Theological College reflects the multi-denominational background of the Uniting Church and is a provider of ecumenical theological studies, offering undergraduate, post-graduate and audit courses that are focused on theology, ministry, pastoral care, philosophy and research methodology.

Additionally, the college focuses on preparing students seeking ordained ministry in the Uniting Church or another denomination, training for service in specified ministries of lay preacher and pastor, and providing higher education and continuing professional development for ministry staff. Field education has been a focus of the college's formation program.

Pilgrim Theological College was opened in 2015. It was previously known as the Uniting Church Theological College, which formed part of the United Faculty of Theology - a co-operative venture of the Anglican, Jesuit and Uniting theological colleges that closed in 2014.

Until its closure, the Uniting Church Theological College was a member school of the Melbourne College of Divinity which had been in operation since 1910, becoming the University of Divinity in 2011. The change to university status followed the decision by the Melbourne College of Divinity to apply to the Victorian Regulation and Qualifications Authority to operate as an "Australian University of Specialisation". In 2012 the college began operating as a university.

Uniting Church Theological College alumni are considered alumni of Pilgrim Theological College.

== Location ==
Pilgrim Theological College operates from the Centre for Theology & Ministry building in the grounds of Ormond College in Parkville, Melbourne. The building was designed by Williams Boag Architects and won the Australian Institute of Architects Award for Heritage Architecture (Vic) in 2008. The building also houses the Dalton McCaughey Library - home to the combined collections of the Jesuit Theological College and Ormond Theological Hall as well as additional material from Queen's College and the theological hall of the Victorian Congregational Church following the inception of the Uniting Church in Australia in 1977.
