= Australian Lutheran College =

- Established: 1968
- Affiliations: Lutheran Church of Australia
- Principal: Rev Dr Tim Stringer
- Location: Adelaide, South Australia, Australia
- Website: www.alc.edu.au

Australian Lutheran College (ALC), formerly Luther Seminary and Lutheran Teachers College, is a higher education institution serving the Lutheran Church of Australia and a registered teaching institution of University of Divinity and the Adelaide College of Divinity.

Until 30 June 2025 the college was located in North Adelaide, South Australia, on the corner of Ward and Jeffcott streets. The campus included a number of single and shared accommodation blocks, a library, and a refectory as well as educational facilities. On 5 January 2026 the college moved to the new Lutheran Church House at 139 Frome Street, Adelaide, on level 2.

Although still primarily a theological college, it is also open to students studying at the Adelaide University, Flinders University, or TAFE, a paradigm reflected in the name change of 2004. Unique among South Australian residential colleges, Australian Lutheran College is equipped to accommodate married students, even with families.

Since 12 February 2024, the principal of the college has been Reverend Doctor Tim Stringer.

== History ==
=== Pre-seminary days ===
Prior to its use as a seminary, the site was used for three different schools or colleges - the North Adelaide Grammar School from 1854 to 1882; Whinham College from 1882 to 1898, during which time a boarding house (now Hebart Hall) and a gymnasium-lecture hall (now the main part of Löhe Memorial Library) were built; and Angas College, owned by John Howard Angas, son of South Australian "patriarch" George Fife Angas and operated as an interdenominational missionary training school until the army took possession of the site for a repatriation hospital in 1916.

=== Immanuel College and Seminary ===
In 1922, the United Evangelical Lutheran Church in Australia purchased the property for only £13,500 on the condition that it was used for Protestant Evangelical religious education. The college and seminary was opened on 25 February 1923 and remained on the site until during World War II, when it was given ten days' notice by the Air Force that the college had to move; upon which it transferred to North Walkerville. The principal was Pastor J. P. Löhe, after whom the library would later be named.

=== Immanuel Seminary ===
The seminary was able to remain on the North Adelaide site and did so, expansively renovating the old college site to extend the seminary itself at the end of the war. Hebart Hall was used as a residence for lecturers and tertiary boarders and the gymnasium-lecture hall ("Angas Hall") for the chapel until its conversion to the library in 1960.

=== Luther Seminary ===
With the amalgamation of the UELCA and the Evangelical Lutheran Church in Australia (ELCA) in 1966 came the amalgamation of the ELCA's seminary (Concordia, where the secondary school is still situated) and the UELCA's North Adelaide seminary. In 1967 extensive building programs began, including additions to the library, the erection of a new boarding house (Graebner Hall) and demolition of the old grammar school to make way for a refectory and extra accommodation (Hamann Hall). The new seminary opened debt-free due to a church appeal which raised $1 million.

The increasing number of married students brought the expansion of the campus to include buildings on Jeffcott Street, Archer Street and Ward Court.

=== Luther Campus ===
Lutheran Teachers College and the Lay Training Centre were moved to the campus in 1989 and with this the name changed to Luther Campus to reflect the change of role of the site. Attempts were made to find suitable sites for relocation for the institution, but these were abandoned in 1990 and the church authorised more works, including the erection of 17 townhouses on Archer Street, a new Student Centre between Graebner Hall and the townhouses. In 1994 the School of Theology (for lay students) joined the campus also.

=== Back to Luther Seminary ===
In 1998 the three occupants of Luther Campus came under the authority of one institution, three programs in one school, and the name was changed back to Luther Seminary.

=== Australian Lutheran College ===
The 2003 General Synod of the church decided to change the name of the institution to Australian Lutheran College beginning 1 January 2004 to reflect the nature of the college as an education facility, not just a seminary. In 2024, the Australian Lutheran Church decided to sell the North Adelaide campus and relocated the college to a new location.

== Academic schools ==
=== School of Pastoral Theology ===
The SPT is the school dedicated to training pastors for work in the Lutheran Church of Australia. Students who are accepted into this school study for Bachelor of Theology and Bachelor of Ministry degrees - a five-year double degree. Subjects are taken in a number of different fields, such as history, theology, biblical studies (including Greek and Hebrew studies) and pastoral theology. Aside from the vicarage period, the teaching is all done on campus.

As this is the only LCA seminary, students come from all over Australia and New Zealand and most live in nearby ALC accommodation. The school attracts a constant stream of international students, primarily from Asia and the Pacific region.

=== School of Educational Theology ===
The SET oversees the training of teachers for service in Lutheran schools. As the nature of this school is one complementary to university studies much of its work is done off campus.

=== School of Theological Studies ===
The STS is the school which provides theological training for lay people - those not studying for ordained ministry. It has a range of on campus subjects and also provides online learning for long distance students.

== Campus life ==
=== Boarding ===
The ALC provides accommodation for up to 96 tertiary boarders (and single students studying at ALC), the majority coming from the surrounding areas such as the Barossa Valley, Mid North, Riverland, Eyre Peninsula, Murray Mallee and Mount Gambier/South East.

Services provided by the ALC for the boarding community include meals, cleaning, linen service, tennis and basketball court and squash court and a basic gym.

=== Chapel ===
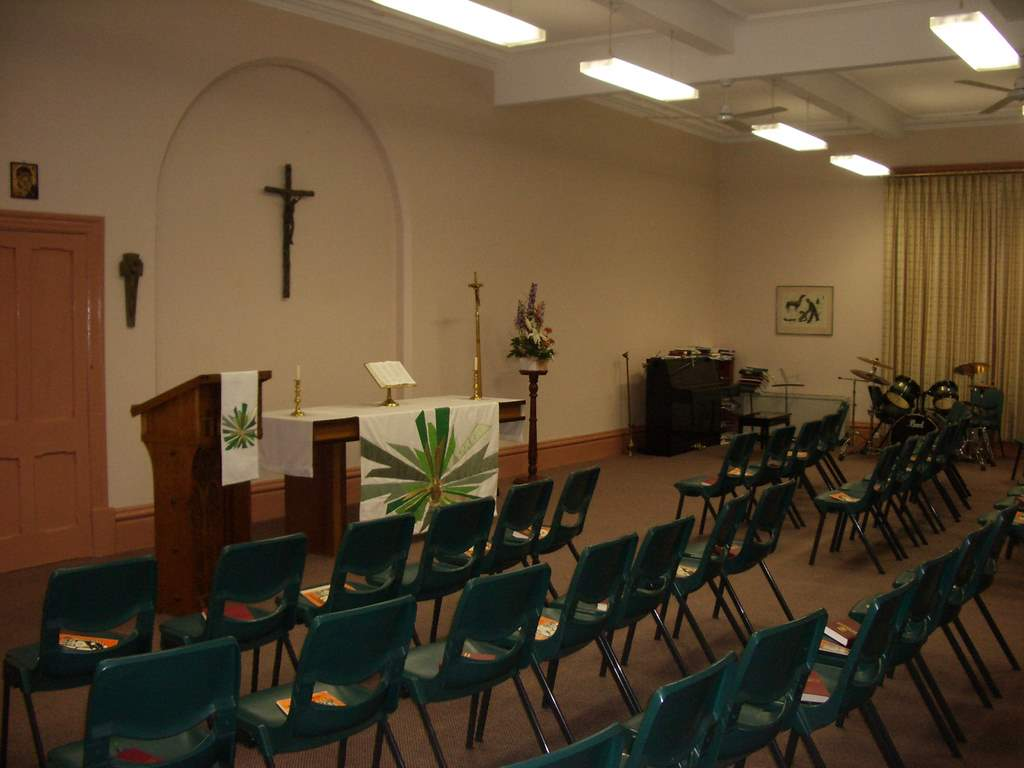
Chapel

Chapel is held mid-morning every weekday during term. It is largely student run and a sermon is heard most weeks, either from a lecturer or a senior student. The chapel is located in Hebart Hall.

=== Löhe Memorial Library ===
The library holds over 90,000 resources including a 1551 imprint of the Luther Bible. The library was named after Johannes Paul Löhe, the principal of Immanuel Seminary, Adelaide from 1923 to 1944. The library contains historical artefacts and a large collection of journals and theologically-based books and material and is mainly housed in Whinham Hall, which was built in 1882.

=== ALC Residents Association ===
Originally called the Luther Seminary Students Association, then changed to the ALC Students Association and with the advent of VSU in Australian universities, has changed to the ALC Residents Association - to make it clearer that the membership extends to those who live on campus, boarders and the ALC students who live in the on campus units.

The ALCRA are responsible for forming a community atmosphere amongst both boarders and students. They organise events during the year, internal sporting competitions and community barbecues.

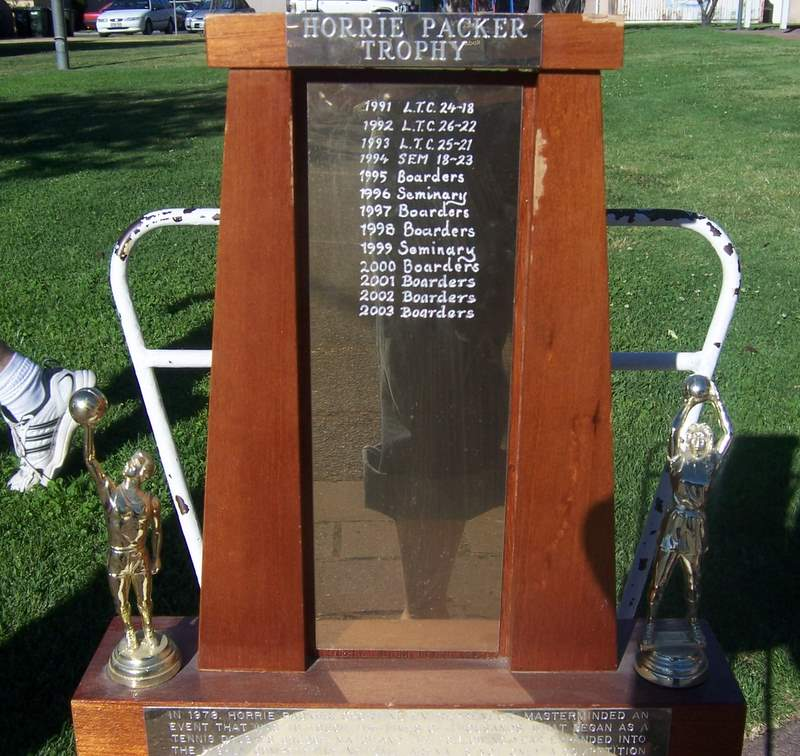
Horrie Packer Trophy

=== Horrie Packer Memorial Mixed Netball Match ===
One of the notable events during the year, originally a mixed-doubles tennis match between the Lutheran Teachers College students and the ALC pastoral ministry students it became a mixed netball match. Now it is a match between the ALC students and the boarders.

In 1978, Horrie Packer, sporting entrepreneur masterminded an event that was to touch the lives of thousands. What began as a tennis doubles grudge-match and the following year expanded into the highly competitive netball arena, is not only a competition between Luther Sem and LTC, but is a struggle to be the best. This trophy stands as a tribute to those who have gone into the battle and survived.

== Tangara magazine ==
Tangara is the college's annual magazine which encompasses all aspects of the community, boarding, teaching and pastoral and theological students.

== Photo gallery ==
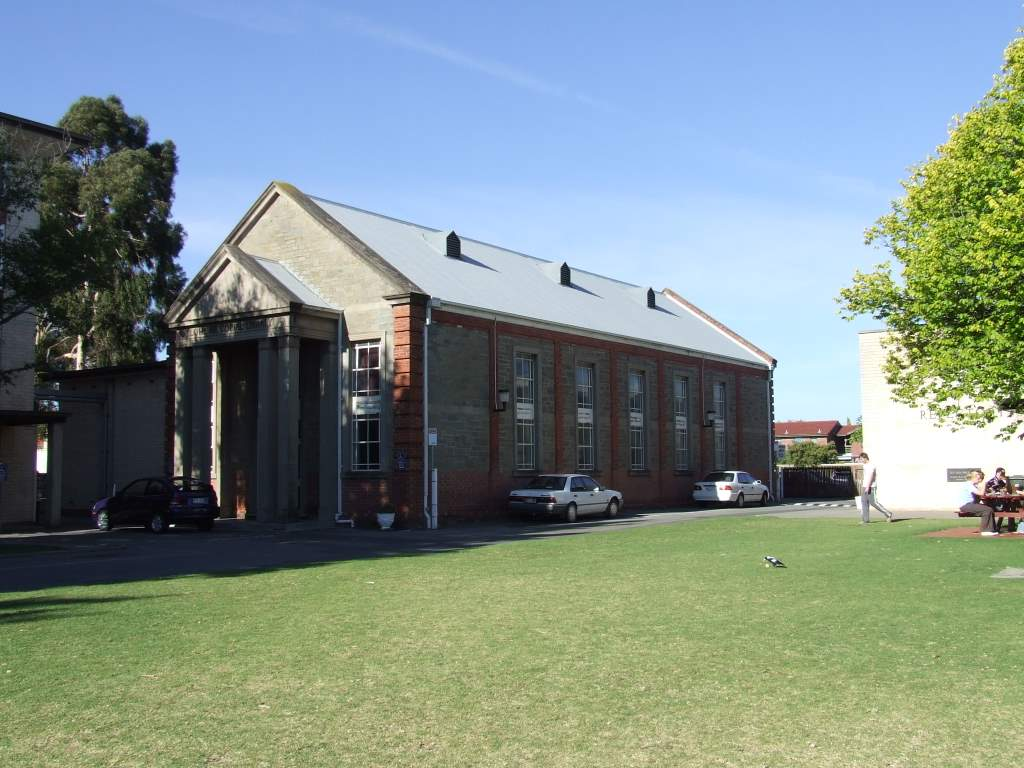
Lohe Memorial Library

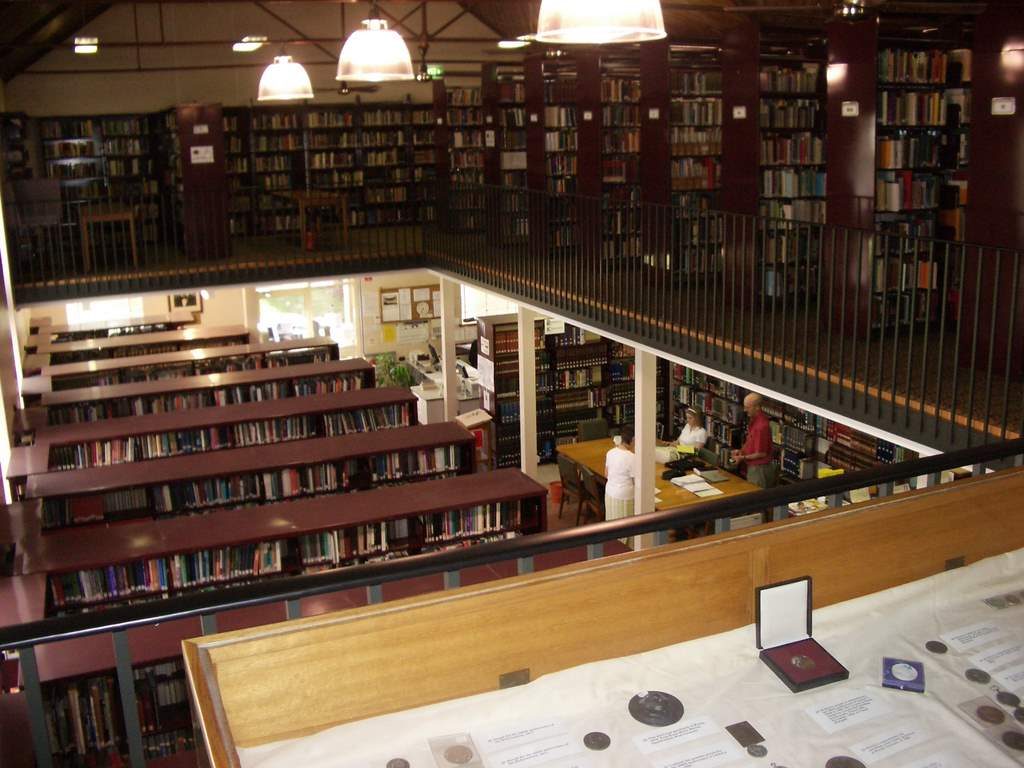
inside the library

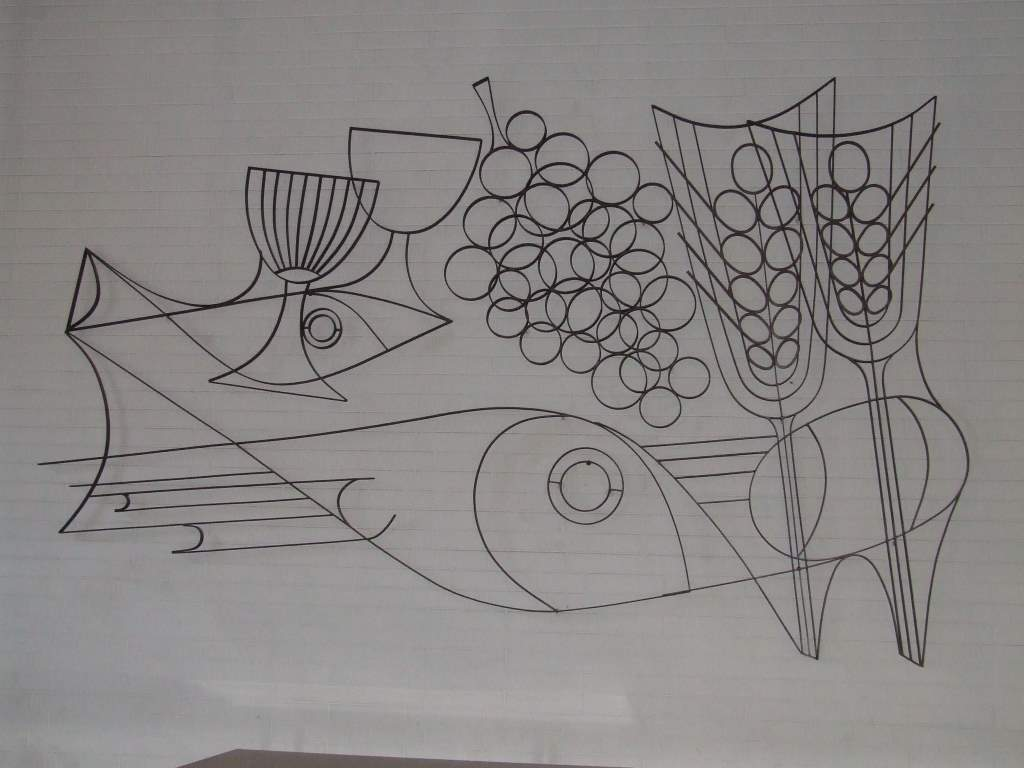
Refectory Mural

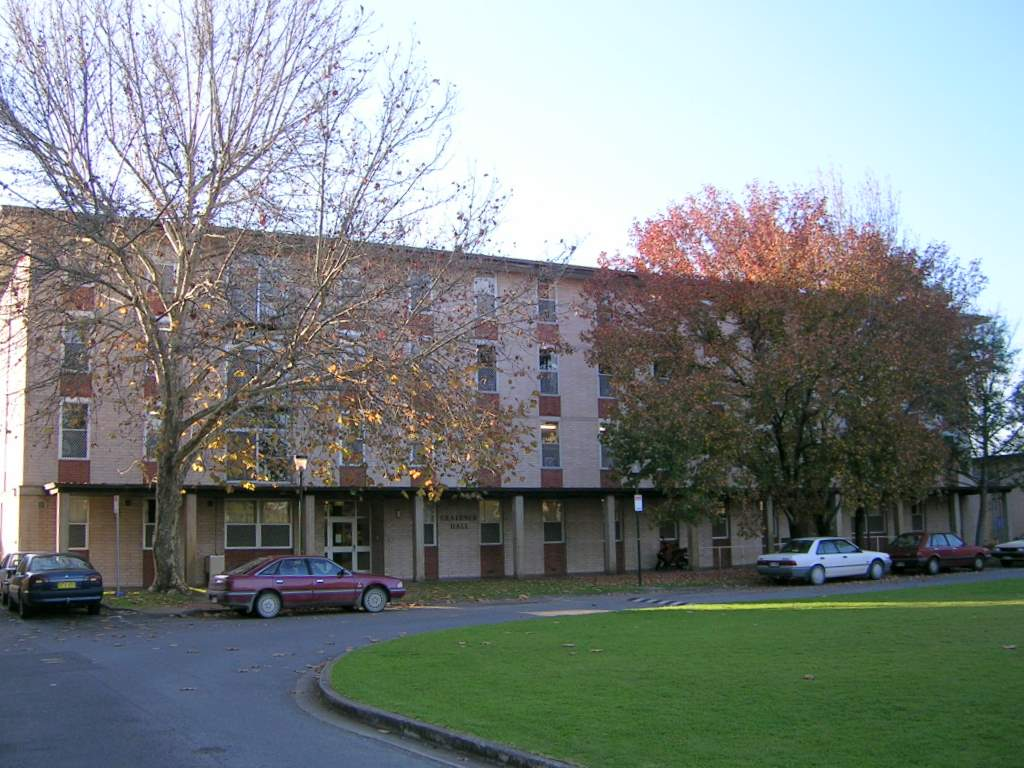
Graebner residential Hall

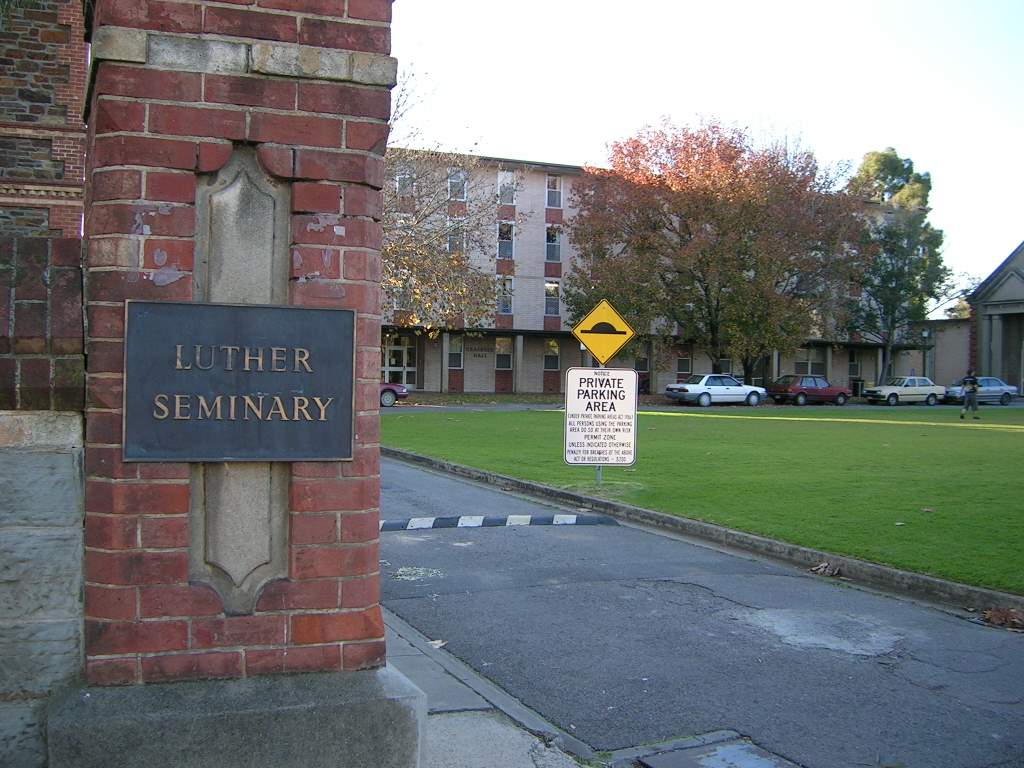
Entrance on Ward Street

== See also ==
- List of libraries in South Australia#Theological libraries
