= Pacifica (journal) =

- Discipline: Theology
- Language: English
- Edited by: Kevin Lenehan

Publication details
- History: 1988–2017
- Publisher: SAGE Publications on behalf of Pacifica Theological Studies Association
- Frequency: Triannually

Standard abbreviations
- ISO 4: Pacifica

Indexing
- ISSN: 1030-570X
- OCLC no.: 439137540

Links
- Journal homepage; Online archive

Pacifica: Australasian Theological Studies was a peer-reviewed academic journal that covered the field of theology. It was sponsored and later owned by the University of Divinity (formerly the Melbourne College of Divinity), which engaged SAGE Publications as the journal's publisher from 2013. Pacifica was established in 1988 and ceased publication in 2017.

== Abstracting and indexing ==
The journal was abstracted and indexed in Academic Search Elite, ATLA Religion Database, New Testament Abstracts, Old Testament Abstracts, and Current Contents.
