= Trinity College Theological School =

Australian Educational Division in Melbourne

Coordinates: 37°47′45″S 144°57′31″E

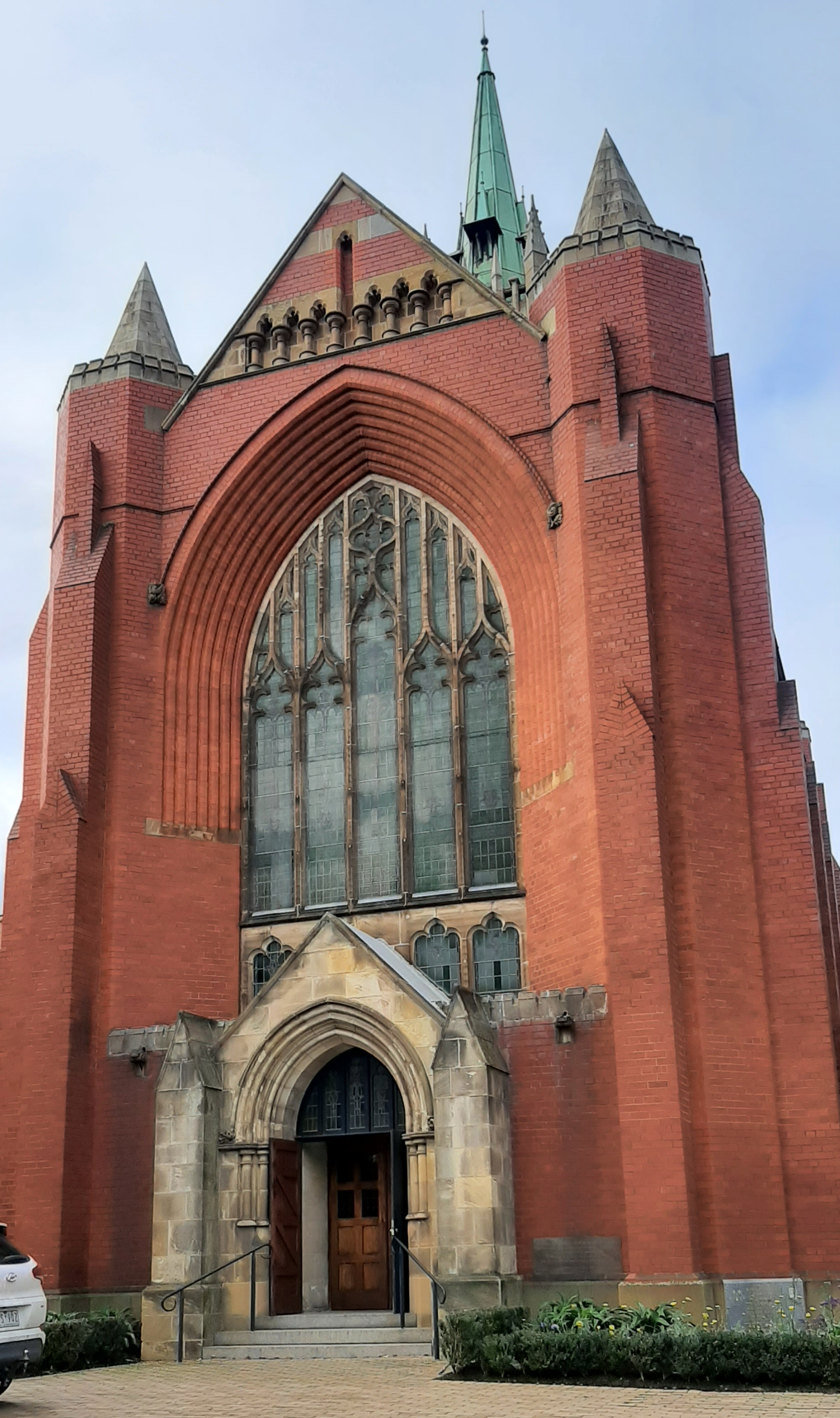
The chapel at Trinity College Theological School, Parkville

Trinity College Theological School (TCTS) is an educational division of Australia's Trinity College, the oldest residential college of the University of Melbourne. It is also one of the constituent colleges of the University of Divinity. The school provides theological education and shapes men and women for ordained and lay ministry in the Anglican tradition, as well as providing other programs of study, including higher degrees by research.

== Overview and history ==
The school was founded in 1877 by Bishop James Moorhouse for the purpose of training a "learned and dedicated clergy" in Victoria, obviating the need to send candidates interstate for training. From this founding vision the school's focus has now broadened to modern forms of theological education and formation for lay people as well as ordination candidates. Trinity teaches across the broad-church, moderate and Anglo-Catholic traditions of theology, worship and spirituality and seeks to engage critically and reflectively with the contemporary world.

Until the 1960s, Trinity theological students normally undertook a degree program of the University of Melbourne, followed by the Licentiate in Theology of the Australian College of Theology. In 1969, Trinity became a foundation member of the ecumenical United Faculty of Theology (UFT). This partnership with the Jesuit Theological College and Methodist, Presbyterian and Congregational theological schools (later combined as the Uniting Church Theological Hall) created a rare ecumenical context for higher learning in theology.

Trinity was a founding member of the Melbourne College of Divinity (MCD) from its inception in 1910. In 2012, the MCD became the University of Divinity and, with the dissolution of the UFT at the end of 2014, Trinity became one of the present 11 colleges of the university. The University of Divinity is the awarding institution of all the degree programs offered within the college. In 2018, Trinity College appointed the university's first research professor and first post-doctoral research fellow.

== Academic programs ==
Trinity College Theological School currently offers the following award programs of the University of Divinity:

- Certificate in Divinity (CertDiv)
- Diploma in Theology (DipTheol)
- Advanced Diploma in Theology and Ministry (AdvDipTheolMin)
- Bachelor of Theology (BTheol)
- Graduate Certificate in Divinity (GCDiv)
- Graduate Certificate in Theology (GCTheol)
- Graduate Certificate in Research Methodology (GCRM)
- Graduate Diploma in Divinity (GDDiv)
- Graduate Diploma in Theology (GDTheol)
- Master of Theology (Coursework) (MTheol)
- Master of Theological Studies (MTS)
- Master of Divinity (MDiv)
- Master of Philosophy (MPhil)
- Doctor of Philosophy (PhD)

Trinity students have access to the collections of both the Leeper Library at Trinity and the Dalton-McCaughey Library, the joint collection of the Jesuit and Uniting Church colleges, with one of the largest theological collections in the southern hemisphere.

== Deans and directors ==
Leadership of theological education at Trinity was originally the responsibility of the college chaplains under the supervision of the warden. Since the 1970s there have been lecturers specifically appointed to teach in and lead the school, holding the positions of Stewart Lecturer, Director and, more recently, Dean. The following have held these offices:

- Max Thomas: Stewart Lecturer, 1971–75
- John Gaden: Director and Stewart Lecturer, 1976–85
- Richard McKinney: Director and Maynard Lecturer, 1986–1997
- Scott Cowdell: Maynard Lecturer and acting director, 1998
- David Cole: Director and Woods Lecturer, 1999–2003
- Andrew McGowan: Director and Munro Lecturer, 2003–2007
- Tim Gaden: Dean and Stewart Lecturer, 2007–2010
- Dorothy Lee: Dean and Frank Woods Professor, 2011–2017
- Mark Lindsay: Joan F. W. Munro Professor and Acting Dean, 2018
- Robert Derrenbacker: Dean and Frank Woods Associate Professor, 2019–present

== Notable alumni ==
Trinity has produced many clergy who have held significant appointments in the Anglican Church. These include:

- Arthur Green (1857–1944), first theological student at Trinity, Bishop of Grafton and Armidale 1894–1901, Ballarat 1901–1915
- Reginald Stephen (1860–1956), Bishop of Tasmania and Dean of Melbourne
- James Grant, Co-adjutor Bishop of Melbourne, 1970–1999
- Bob Dann, Archbishop of Melbourne 1977–1983
- Peter Carnley, Archbishop of Perth and Primate of the Anglican Church of Australia 2000–2005
- Peter Hollingworth, Archbishop of Brisbane 1989–2001; Governor General of Australia 2001–2003
- Andrew Curnow, Bishop of Bendigo 2003–2017
- Phillip Aspinall, Archbishop of Brisbane 2002–present; Primate of the Anglican Church of Australia 2005–14
- Kay Goldsworthy, Archbishop of Perth 2018–present; first woman ordained a bishop in the Anglican Church of Australia; first woman in the worldwide Anglican Communion to hold title of archbishop
- Alison Taylor, Assistant Bishop, Diocese of Brisbane 2013–2017
- Peter Stuart, Bishop of Newcastle, 2018–present
