= United Faculty of Theology =

The United Faculty of Theology (UFT) was a recognised teaching institution of the University of Divinity in Melbourne, Australia. It was founded in 1969 as an informal association of theological colleges and ceased operating in December 2014.

The UFT comprised:

- The Jesuit Theological College of the Society of Jesus (incorporated in Victoria), Jesuit College of Spirituality from 2016
- Trinity College Theological School, part of Trinity College and affiliated to the Anglican Province of Victoria
- The Uniting Church Theological College (Synod of Victoria and Tasmania), Pilgrim Theological College from 2015

The Anglican Church continues to provide theological education through the Trinity College Theological School and the Uniting Church through Pilgrim Theological College.

== History ==
The UFT arose from co-operation between the theological halls (seminaries) based at Queen's College and Ormond College, respectively Methodist and Presbyterian foundations affiliated with the University of Melbourne. In the 1960s, and even earlier, they shared resources while preparing resident theological students for the externally-examined graduate Bachelor of Divinity degree of the Melbourne College of Divinity. The two bodies effectively amalgamated before the formal union of the Presbyterian, Methodist and Congregational churches as the Uniting Church in Australia in 1977.

During the same period, the Jesuit Theological College moved to nearby facilities in Parkville and asked Ormond College to accommodate its library. The result was the Joint Theological Library (later the Dalton-McCaughey Library) which over time came to serve all member institutions of the faculty.

In 1969 the faculty was formally created by the three halls of what later became the Pilgrim Theological College the Uniting Church, together with the Jesuit college and the theological school of Trinity College, the Anglican residential college at the University of Melbourne, agreed to form the faculty and to teach a new degree, the undergraduate Bachelor of Theology (BTheol).

The UFT ceased operating in December 2014.
