= Towards a Feminist Theology =

Publication based on Australian feminist theology conference held in 1989

- Editor: Elaine Lindsay
- Language: English
- Published: 1990
- Publication place: Australia
- Media type: Print (paperback)
- ISBN: 978-0-7316-9879-0
- OCLC: 29321188
- Dewey Decimal: 230.082 21

Towards a Feminist Theology is the title of a publication based on an Australian feminist theology conference held from 18 to 20 August 1989 at the Collaroy Centre in Sydney. The conference was the first ecumenical feminist theology conference held in Australia. Significantly it was also the first time that three women's organisations had joined with a common purpose. The combined gathering of around 500 attendees represented an important milestone in the development of feminist theology in Australia.

== Summary ==
The national feminist theology conference was called together by three women's organisations, the Movement for the Ordination of Women (Australia), Women and the Australian Church (WATAC), and Women-Church. The conference was regarded as a landmark event and was held in Sydney at the Collaroy Centre. It took the place of the 5th National Conference of the Movement for the Ordination of Women (Australia) and the 2nd National Conference for Women and the Australian Church (WATAC). Bernice Moore was the national president of WATAC at the time and Patricia Brennan was the National President of MOW. Reports of the number of attendees at the conference vary depending on the source, with one indicating it was attended by "nearly 400 women plus a number of men" and another saying 500 women and men.

German-American Roman Catholic feminist theologian Elisabeth Schussler Fiorenza had accepted an invitation from MOW to come to Australia, in what was to be her first visit to the country. Fiorenza was scheduled to be the key-note speaker but had to cancel in the week preceding the conference due to ill-health. Conference organisers including Patricia Brennan and Eileen Baldry arranged for Fiorenza to still contribute to the conference via papers, video tape and a telephone link with the USA. An Australian response to the work of Fiorenza was also contributed by Erin White and Elaine Wainwright. White was the founder of the Sydney Women-Church Group and one of the founding editors of the journal Women-Church. The conference program included panel presentations from different denominational groups and liturgies prepared by each of the organising groups.

At the conference, a unanimous decision from the floor resolved that they meet again in two years time. The Women Authoring Theology Conference, was subsequently held in Strathfield, Sydney in 1991. A third conference was held in Melbourne and a fourth conference, Dangerous Memory, was held in Canberra in 1995.

The publication associated with the conference was edited by Elaine Lindsay, with illustrations by Bernice Moore, and photographs by Helen Leonard. It included Fiorenza's paper 'Daughters of Vision and Struggle', personal perspectives on feminist theology by Marie Tulip, Linda Walter, Christine Burke and Alison Cheek, and the responses to Fiorenza's work by Erin White and Elaine Wainwright. Mannix Library, in East Melbourne has digitised Towards a Feminist Theology and made it available on the University of Divinity's Digital Collections website and on JSTOR Open Community Collections, along with other publications related to the Movement for the Ordination of Women.
