= Women Authoring Theology =

Publication based on Australian feminist theology conference held in 1991

- Editor: Elaine Lindsay
- Language: English
- Published: 1992
- Publication place: Australia
- Media type: Print (paperback)
- ISBN: 9780646074481
- OCLC: 27552547
- Dewey Decimal: 230.082 21

Women Authoring Theology is the title of a publication based on a national Australian feminist theology conference held in Strathfied, Sydney in 1991. It was the second ecumenical conference of its type ever held in Australia, with attendees mostly coming mostly from the Roman Catholic, Anglican, and Uniting Churches in Australia, as well as several international keynote speakers.

== Summary ==
The Women Authoring Theology conference was organised by the Movement for the Ordination of Women (Australia), Women and the Australian Church (WATAC), Women-Church, and the Feminist Uniting Network, and was held in Strathfield from 24 to 26 May 1991. A newspaper report in the week prior to the conference stated that the organisers had hit out at the Australian Catholic Bishops' lack of serious response to the "oft-stated concerns of women with regard to sexism in the church and the role of women". The conference was the second national ecumenical feminist theology conference ever held in Australia. The first conference, titled Towards a Feminist Theology, had been held at the Collaroy Centre in Sydney in 1989. A unanimous decision from the floor had resolved that they meet again in two years. A third conference was held in Melbourne and a fourth conference, Dangerous Memory, was held in Canberra in 1995.

The publication associated with the Women Authoring Theology conference was edited by Elaine Lindsay, with cartoons by Graham English. The conference and proceedings included contributions from Patricia Brennan, Barbara Thiering and Elizabeth Evatt. Evatt had been appointed as a member of the United Nations Committee on the Elimination of Discrimination against Women (CEDAW) in 1984, remained a member until 1992, and was Chair of the CEDAW Committee from 1989 to 1991.

International guest speakers included Gloria Durka and Canadian-born English theologian and philosopher Janet Soskice. Gloria Durka had been the President of Association of Professors and Researchers in Religious Education (APRRE) (later the Religious Education Association) in 1989–1990. A paper by German feminist theologian Elisabeth Moltmann-Wendal was included in the proceedings even though she had been unable to travel to the conference due to ill health.

In a section of the program titled Australians Authoring Theology, contributions were made by Margaret Curtis, Bernice Moore, Erin White, Patricia Harrison, Therese Curtis, Gail Vincent, Janet Wood, and Rita Baptista.

Mannix Library, in East Melbourne has digitised Women Authoring Theology and made it available on the University of Divinity's Digital Collections website and on JSTOR Open Community Collections, along with other publications related to the Movement for the Ordination of Women.
