= Dangerous Memory =

Publication based on Australian feminist theology conference held in 1995

- Editor: Keryn Hassall
- Language: English
- Published: 1995
- Publication place: Australia
- Media type: Print (paperback)
- ISBN: 978-0-646-37179-5
- OCLC: 222294501
- Dewey Decimal: 230 21

Dangerous Memory is the title of a publication based on a national Australian feminist theology conference held in Canberra in 1995. It was the fourth ecumenical conference of its type held in Australia.

== Background ==
The Dangerous Memory: Feminist Theology Through Story conference was organised by the Australian Feminist Theology Foundation and was held in Canberra in September 1995.

The conference was the fourth national ecumenical feminist theology conference of its type held in Australia. The four national conferences were held over a decade in Sydney, Melbourne and Canberra. The first conference, titled Towards a Feminist Theology, was held at the Collaroy Centre in Sydney in 1989. A unanimous decision from the floor had resolved that they meet again in two years. The Australian Feminist Theology Foundation was founded after the first conference in 1989 and went on to fund and facilitate other Australian feminist theology projects.

The second conference, titled Women Authoring Theology was held in Strathfield, New South Wales, in May 1991. It was organised by the Movement for the Ordination of Women (Australia), Women and the Australian Church (WATAC), Women-Church, and the Feminist Uniting Network.

Attendees at the Dangerous Memory conference came from a variety of Christian denominations, including the Roman Catholic, Anglican, and Uniting Churches in Australia. The publication associated with the Dangerous Memory conference was edited by Keryn Hassall. Other members of the editorial committee included Heather Thomson, Gillian Hunt and Winifred Wing Han Lamb. The conference and proceedings included contributions from Loreto Sister and academic Veronica Brady, academic and feminist theologian Elaine Lindsay and sociologist of religion and gender Kathleen McPhillips.
