= Jean Gledhill =

Australian feminist church leader

- Occupation: Feminist church leader

Jean Gledhill is a member of the Uniting Church in Australia and a former member of the Commission on the Status of Women of the Australian Council of Churches. She was associated with two publications that contributed to the development of religious feminism in Australia. These were the Christian feminist magazine Magdalene and Women-Church: an Australian journal of feminist studies in religion.

== Career ==
Gledhill is a member of the Uniting Church in Australia and was a member of the Commission on the Status of Women of the Australian Council of Churches. She convened the commission's task group on Domestic Violence and the Church.

During the late 1980s she was a part time faculty member at the United Theological College in New South Wales, a theological college for the training and education of ministers for the Uniting Church. In 1987 she was appointed as the Co-ordinator of a team of people to introduce a new programme of pastoral studies at the college over a three-year period. Gledhill was made a Companion of the college in 2003.

Gledhill spoke at the launch of Women-Church: an Australian journal of feminist studies in religion, which was distributed internationally and published between 1987 and 2007 by the Women-Church Collective. The journal was launched at the first Women and the Australian Church (WATAC) National Conference that was held in Sydney in August 1987.

Gledhill's speech at this event placed the launch of the journal in the context of Australian religious feminism. She spoke about an earlier publication with which she had been associated. Magdalene, an Australian Christian feminist magazine, had been published from 1973 to 1987 and Gledhill was a member of the collective that produced the magazine. Gledhill noted that Magdalene "started as a vehicle for women to tell their own stories – stories growing out of the oppression which they had experienced in the church, in domestic life, in their work and in society at large." Gledhill's speech was published in its entirety in the second issue of Women-Church.

In 1990 a conference was held in Melbourne to consider whether gender equality was a reality in the Uniting Church in Australia. The published proceedings included brief biographies of significant women in the church. Gledhill contributed a biography about Lilian Wells, the first moderator of the New South Wales Synod of the Uniting Church in Australia.

== Select publications ==
- Gledhill, Jean. "Launching Women-Church." Women-Church: An Australian Journal of Feminist Studies in Religion, no. 2 (Autumn 1988): 6. Digitised version of no. 2 (1988) available on JSTOR Open Community Collections University of Divinity Digital Collections, Mannix Library.
- Gledhill, Jean. “Women Ministering in the Uniting Church: A Personal Reflection.” Women-Church: An Australian Journal of Feminist Studies in Religion, no. 40 (2007): 25–27. https://search.informit.org/doi/10.3316/ielapa.200709488 Digitised version of no. 40 (2007) available on JSTOR Open Community Collections University of Divinity Digital Collections, Mannix Library.
- Gledhill, Jean, ‘Lilian Wells’, In Elizabeth Wood Ellem, ed., The Church Made Whole: National Conference on Women in the Uniting Church in Australia (Melbourne: David Lovell Publishing, 1990) pp. 271–2. 9781863550062
