= Angela Coco =

Australian sociologist and academic

- Occupations: Sociologist and academic

Academic background
- Education: University of Queensland PhD; University of Queensland BA (Hons)
- Thesis: Catholics’ meaning-making in critical situations (1998)

Academic work
- Discipline: Sociology
- Sub-discipline: Sociology of religion
- Institutions: Southern Cross University
- Main interests: Sociology of religion, new religious movements, Catholicism, Paganism
- Website: researchportal.scu.edu.au/esploro/profile/angela_coco/overview

Angela Coco is an Australian sociologist and academic whose primary research interests have been in the area of the sociology of religion, new religious movements, Catholicism, and Paganism.

== Education ==
Coco completed a Bachelor of Arts degree with Honours in 1991 at the University of Queensland, in Brisbane, Australia. Her honours thesis, Women and the Australian Church: Project or Proclamation? provides the only record of the early history of the Christian feminist group, Women and the Australian Church (WATAC).

Coco went on to complete a Doctor of Philosophy in Sociology in 1998, also at the University of Queensland, in the Department of Anthropology and Sociology. Her doctoral thesis was titled Catholics’ meaning-making in critical situations, and this research provided a foundation for the later publication, Catholics, conflicts and choices an exploration of power relations in the Catholic Church.

== Career ==
Coco was a Senior Lecturer in the School of Arts and Social Sciences at Southern Cross University in Lismore, NSW from 2004 to 2018.

Her research and publication history has focused on the areas of Catholics experiences of conflict with the church, the Catholic social movement called 'Women and the Australian Church', Pagan organising and communicating in online/offline spaces, and Universal Medicine (New Religious Movement)

Coco was a member of the executive that established the Women Scholars of Religion and Theology association. She was also on the editorial collective for the official peer-reviewed journal of the association Seachanges.

Coco's book Catholics, conflicts and choices an exploration of power relations in the Catholic Church was published in Routledge's Gender, Theology and Spirituality series. One reviewer stated that Coco's "…analysis is an important contribution to feminist scholarship documenting the complicated, differentiated realities of individuals’ everyday/everynight experiences. As such, her findings may help readers appreciate why religious institutions face decline if their institutional narratives, including their social doctrines and pastoral guidelines, pay little attention to lived experiences."

Following the publication of the book Coco was interviewed by John Cleary on ABC Radio National to discuss some of the wider issues behind the clergy sex abuse crisis.

In 2016, the Women’s Caucus of the Australian Association for the Study of Religion invited Coco to give the Penny Magee Memorial Lecture and she spoke on Touching taboos: sex, gender and Universal Medicine

== Select publications ==
=== Books ===
- Coco, Angela (2013), Catholics, conflicts and choices : an exploration of power relations in the Catholic Church, Routledge, ISBN 978-1844656516

=== Book chapters ===
- Coco, Angela, Roman Catholicism: a communication impasse, In Hunt, Stephen, ed. Handbook of Global Contemporary Christianity : Movements, Institutions, and Allegiance. Brill Handbooks on Contemporary Religion, Volume 12. Leiden: Brill, 2016. pp. 55-76. https://doi.org/10.1163/9789004310780_004

=== Journal articles ===
- Coco, Angela. “The Way of the Livingness and Universal Medicine.” Nova Religio 24, no. 1 (2020): 55–76. https://doi.org/10.1525/nr.2020.24.1.55
- Coco, Angela. “Pagans Online and Offline: Locating Community in Postmodern Times.” Sociological Spectrum 28, no. 5 (2008): 510–30. https://doi.org/10.1080/02732170802206138
- Coco, Angela; Woodward, Ian (2007). "Discourses of Authenticity with a Pagan Community: The Emergence of the "Fluffy Bunny" Sanction". Journal of Contemporary Ethnography. 36 (5): 479–504. doi:10.1177/0891241606293160. S2CID 144233008.
- Coco, Angela. "Searching for reflections: women's paths to a pagan spirituality group" Australian Religion Studies Review, 14(1) (2001): 19–30. https://openjournals.library.sydney.edu.au/index.php/ARSR/article/view/8943
- Coco, Angela. "I can't hear you: Barriers to communication in the Roman Catholic culture", Electronic Journal of Communication/ Revue Electronique du Communication, V. 9 (2,3,4) (1999)
- Coco, Angela. "Women and the Australian Church (WATAC): A Proclamation?", Women-Church: Australian Journal of Feminist Studies in Religion, no. 12 (Autumn 1993): 38–45. Digitised version of no. 12 (1993) available on JSTOR Open Community Collections, University of Divinity Digital Collections, Mannix Library
