= Erin White (feminist theologian) =

Australian feminist philosopher and theologian

- Born: 1941 (age 84–85)
- Education: University of Sydney PhD
- Occupations: Feminist philosopher and theologian
- Known for: Founder of Sydney Women-Church group

Erin Gabrielle White (born 1941) is a feminist philosopher and theologian. As an author she contributed significantly to feminist scholarship in Australia. She was the founder of the Sydney Women-Church Group and one of the founding editors of Women-Church: an Australian journal of feminist studies in religion.

== Early life and education ==
Erin White was born in 1941. She completed her PhD in the Department of Religious Studies at the University of Sydney. Her doctoral thesis, Itineraries of meaning: Paul Ricoeur's hermeneutic of the idea of the sacred, was completed in 1986.

== Career ==
White was a nun for 15 years from 1960 to 1975. The 1970s had seen a rise of Christian feminism in Australian churches and White suggested that as a nun she had been untouched by this wave of feminism because, "[W]e were too busy to hear; we had too many responsibilities to feel powerless; we were encouraged to be anti-intellectual; we lived in a Catholic female ghetto largely shielded from the more crass aspects of sexism and the more enlightened aspects of ecumenism."

White, along with Hilary Carey, was one of the founding editors of Women-Church: an Australian journal of feminist studies in religion, which was distributed internationally and published between 1987 and 2007 by the Women-Church Collective. The journal was launched at the first Women and the Australian Church (WATAC) National Conference that was held in Sydney in August 1987. In Women-Church's second-last and final issue White contributed personal accounts of the history of the journal and the Women-Church Group. The Women-Church archives are now held by the Jessie Street National Women's Library in Sydney.

White was a significant contributor to feminist scholarship in Australia. In 1989, at the Towards a Feminist Theology national conference held in Sydney, White, along with Elaine Wainwright, contributed an Australian response to the work of feminist theologian Elisabeth Schussler Fiorenza. The conference had been called together by the Movement for the Ordination of Women (Australia), Women and the Australian Church (WATAC), and Women-Church. At the time White was a post-doctoral Fellow in the School of Philosophy at the University of New South Wales.

White was also a presenter at the Women Authoring Theology Conference, held in Strathfield, Sydney in 1991.

White's book Knowing otherwise: feminism, women & religion, was co-authored with Marie Tulip and published in 1991. One reviewer, Margaret Heagney described the work as “a vital contribution to feminist scholarship in Australia”. White's other contributions included journal articles and book chapters in edited volumes, in subject areas related to religion and gender, theology and feminism.

== Personal life ==
After White left the Sisters of St Brigid, she later married Graham Joseph English (16 September 1944 – 15 June 2021) and they had one child together.

== Select publications ==
- White, Erin; Tulip, Marie (1991), Knowing otherwise : feminism, women & religion, D. Lovell Pub, ISBN 978-1-86355-005-5
- Catholic Education Office (Sydney, N.S.W.); Tulip, Marie; White, Erin; Catholic Education Office, (Sydney) (1989), Women in the church and the world : an annotated bibliography prepared by the Gender and Equity Committee for Catholic Education Office Sydney., Catholic Education Office, ISBN 094914052X
- White, Erin; Poulos, Elenie; Wainwright, Elaine Mary; With Women Conference (3rd : 1995 : Kedron, Qld.) (1996), Transforming traditions : three keynote addresses given at the 3rd Annual With Women Conference held at Mt Alvernia College, Kedron, 27-28 October 1995.

=== Book chapters ===
- White, Erin. 1983. "Understanding two familiar models. God is father : a Ricoeurian interpretation." In Remodelling God: A Thematic Introduction to Metaphorical Theology, edited by William W Emilsen and Andrew D Irvine. Melbourne Australia: Joint Board of Christian Education and Desbooks.
- White, Erin. 1995. "Religion and the hermeneutics of gender: an examination of the work of Paul Ricoeur." In Religion and Gender, edited by Ursula King. Oxford, UK: Blackwell.
- White, Erin. 1995. "Feminist understanding and the place of critique : a hermeneutical response to Daphne Hampson's Theology and feminism." In Freedom and Entrapment: Women Thinking Theology, edited by Maryanne Confoy, Dorothy A Lee, and Joan Nowotny. North Blackburn, Vic.: Dove.

=== Journal articles ===
- White, Erin. 1991. "Between suspicion and hope: Paul Ricoeur’s vital hermeneutic." Journal of Literature and Theology 5 (3): 311–321. https://doi.org/10.1093/litthe/5.3.311
- White, Erin. 2006. "Women-Church Journals as it was in the beginning." Women-Church: An Australian Journal of Feminist Studies in Religion 39: 3-5. Digitised version of v. 39 (2006) available on JSTOR Open Community Collections, University of Divinity Digital Collections, Mannix Library.
- White, Erin. 2007. "Women-Church: a personal account." Women-Church: An Australian Journal of Feminist Studies in Religion 40: 125-128. https://search.informit.org/doi/10.3316/ielapa.200709506 Digitised version of v. 40 (2007) available on JSTOR Open Community Collections, University of Divinity Digital Collections, Mannix Library.
