= Christian Women Concerned =

Australian religious feminist organisation

- Abbreviation: CWC
- Founded: 1968
- Location: Epping, Sydney
- Region served: Australia
- Key people: Founders, Marie Tulip, Dorothy McRae-McMahon and Jean Skuse

Christian Women Concerned was the first explicitly religious feminist organisation in Australia. It was founded in 1968 by a small ecumenical group of feminist scholars that included Marie Tulip, Dorothy McRae-McMahon and Jean Skuse. The organisation played a significant role in the establishment of the Commission on the Status of Women in the Church by the Australian Council of Churches and published the Christian feminist magazine Magdalene from 1973 to 1987.

== History ==
Christian Women Concerned was formed in 1968. It was one of a number of Christian feminist groups established between the late 1960s and the early 1990s, that included Women and the Australian Church (WATAC) (1982) and the Movement for the Ordination of Women (Australia) (1983). It sought to bring women together and make feminism more generally acceptable in an environment where the women's liberation movement was seen by some as a threat to families.

Christian Women Concerned started as a social justice group, and was actively involved in programs for social change, advocating peace, justice for Aboriginal people, and the elimination of poverty, prejudice, and violence against women. Arising from Presbyterian, Congregational and Methodist traditions, it soon became interested in how Christian teaching contributed to women's oppression. Many of its founders, including Marie Tulip, Dorothy McRae-McMahon and Jean Skusehad prominent roles in the church over the next decades, challenging gender discrimination in the Uniting Church and beyond. It has been noted that this was "the first time that there was a discrete Christian feminist voice articulating women's oppression in mainstream Christian churches and tying that oppression to others in a systematic analysis."

Christian Women Concerned began publishing Magdalene (newsletter) in 1973. Marie Tulip was the editor of the magazine which ran successfully until 1987. Australian academic and sociologist of religion, Kathleen McPhillips, described Magdalene as "a powerful forum for discussion, change and creativity reflecting the early challenges of second wave feminism and its extensive social justice program."

In the early 1970s Christian Women Concerned influenced the Australian Council of Churches' decision to establish the Commission on the Status of Women in the Church. It invited feminists of international renown such as Rosemary Radford Reuther to its major conferences and was generously funded by the Whitlam government during International Women's Year in 1975. Many members of the group already had associations with the Women's Movement in Australia during the 1960s. Christian Women Concerned would also give rise to the first Australian Anglican women's activist group, Anglican Women Concerned, which formed in 1975.
