= Magdalene (newsletter) =

Australian Christian feminist magazine

Magdalene: a Christian newsletter for women
- Discipline: Christianity studies
- Language: English

Publication details
- History: 1973–1987
- Publisher: Christian Women Concerned (Australia)

Standard abbreviations
- ISO 4: Magdalene

Indexing
- OCLC no.: 173323146
- Magdalene on JSTOR Open Community Collections

Magdalene: A Christian Newsletter for Women was an Australian Christian feminist magazine published by the Sydney group Christian Women Concerned.

Fifteen volumes of the title were published over a 10-year period, Volume 1 (May 1973)-3/4 1987.

The group Christian Women Concerned had been formed in 1968 and was the first explicitly religious feminist organisation in Australia. It was founded by a small ecumenical group of feminist scholars that included Marie Tulip, Dorothy McRae-McMahon and Jean Skuse. They sought to bring women together and make feminism more generally acceptable in an environment where the women's liberation movement was seen by some as a threat to families.

Christian Women Concerned began publishing Magdalene in 1973 as a way to disseminate their views more widely. The magazine covered a broad range of topics in the fields of feminism and religion. Marie Tulip was one of the magazine's founding editors as well as being a regular contributor. Jean Gledhill noted that Magdalene "started as a vehicle for women to tell their own stories – stories growing out of the oppression which they had experienced in the church, in domestic life, in their work and in society at large."

Australian sociologist of religion and gender Kathleen McPhillips noted that Magdalene "was a powerful forum for discussion, change and creativity reflecting the early challenges of second wave feminism and its extensive social justice program."

After Magdalene ceased publication in 1987 the members of Christian Women Concerned recognised and supported the development of a new Australian Christian feminist journal. Women-Church: an Australian journal of feminist studies in religion commenced publication in 1987.

In 2020, Australian historian Clare Monagle was awarded a Religious History Fellowship by the State Library of New South Wales for the project: Christian Consciousness Raising: Magdalene Journal and Australian feminism.

== Access ==
Mannix Library in East Melbourne has digitised all issues of the title and made it available via the University of Divinity's Digital Collections website and on JSTOR Open Community Collections.
