= Patricia Madigan =

Australian religious academic (born 1950)

- Born: 1950 (age 75–76)
- Occupations: Interfaith activist; Theologian; Religious sister
- Known for: Representative at Australian National Dialogue of Christians, Muslims and Jews (ANDCMJ); Member, Commission for Ecumenical and Interfaith Relations; Member and Chair, Australian Catholic Bishops Council for Australian Catholic Women; Executive Director, Commission for Ecumenical and Interfaith Relations, Catholic Archdiocese of Sydney; Councillor on the Leadership Team of the Dominican Sisters of Eastern Australia and the Solomon Islands
- Notable work: Books and chapters: Women and Fundamentalism in Islam and Catholicism: negotiating modernity in a globalized world; “Looking Forward: Women and the Plenary Council” in Still Listening to the Spirit: Women and Man Twenty Years Later; “Graced by Migration: An Australian Perspective” in Christianities in Migration: The Global Perspective, “Ethics in a Multifaith Society: Christians and Muslims in Dialogue,” in Pathways for Interreligious Dialogue in the Twenty First Century

Patricia (Trish) Madigan OP (born 1950) is an Australian religious sister, a member and leader of the Dominican Sisters of Eastern Australia and the Solomon Islands and Executive Director of the Dominican Centre for Interfaith Ministry Education and Research (CIMER). Madigan is known nationally and internationally as "a leader in ecumenical and interfaith relations in the Catholic Church in Australia".

== Early life and education ==
Patricia Madigan was born in 1950. She entered the religious life and became a religious sister as a member of The Dominican Sisters of Eastern Australia and the Solomon Islands.

Madigan has a Bachelor of Humanities (History and Mathematics) and Diploma of Education from La Trobe University, Melbourne and University of New England; Bachelor of Divinity (major in New Testament), Melbourne College of Divinity; Master of Philosophy from the Irish School of Ecumenics, Trinity College, Dublin; was a resident graduate at Harvard Divinity School; Research Fellow, Institute of Gender and Women’s Studies, American University of Cairo, Egypt; then earned a doctorate in Arabic and Islamic studies at the University of Sydney.

== Career ==
After beginning her career as a secondary school teacher and university chaplain, Madigan has worked predominantly in ecumenical and interfaith ministry in Sydney, Australia. She was a foundation member of the Women's Interfaith Network (WIN) in Sydney and a Christian representative on the Australian National Dialogue of Christians, Muslims and Jews (ANDCMJ), Australia's peak inter-religious body and was the former Director of the Commission for Ecumenical and Interfaith Relations in the Catholic Diocese of Broken Bay (2003–2013) and the Catholic Archdiocese of Sydney (1997–2003).

=== Interfaith work internationally and in Australia ===
In 2002 Madigan participated in a Consultation of the Pontifical Council for Inter-Religious Dialogue for the Asian region held in Seoul, South Korea. Between 2004 and 2012 Madigan was an Australian government-appointed delegate at five regional inter-governmental conferences of the Asia-Pacific Dialogue on Regional Interfaith Cooperation for Peace, Development and Human Dignity. She was a presenter at the 2009 Parliament of World Religions and a speaker at the 2014 G20 Interfaith Forum.

She is a former member of the Australian Catholic Bishops' Advisory Committee for Ecumenical and Interfaith Relations and the former Chair of the Australian Catholic Bishops' Council for Australian Catholic Women (CACW).

=== Academic, author and feminist ===
Madigan is the author of many books and articles about interreligious dialogue and also writes about the status of women in the Catholic Church and in other religions. Recognising her as a respected academic and professional, the Australian Human Rights Commission commissioned her to write a discussion paper, "Freedom of religion, gender and belief: a Catholic perspective" for its Report on Freedom of Religion and Belief in 21st Century Australia.

In her paper, Madigan wrote "Religious authorities have often made women’s bodies the turf on which their own power struggles are played out...Women will need to walk a freedom road that is both material and spiritual...Religions need to examine how their teachings, practices and structures add strength to world systems that exploit women and contribute to women’s marginalization and disempowerment...Today, many Catholic women, faithful to their religious tradition, are challenging fundamentalist religious teachings which diminish them...Gender equality in both church and society is ‘mission-critical’ to poverty reduction and international peace and security, and power holders must answer for their performance in advancing women’s rights."

After the Arab Spring, Madigan published Women and Fundamentalism in Islam and Catholicism, one reviewer noted the timeliness of her work as much as its content.

As chair of the Council for Australian Catholic Women, in 2018 Madigan was interviewed on the Catholic community's response to domestic violence and in 2019 was interviewed by the Australian Broadcasting Commission's Radio National program on the Nuns Too movement.

== Publications ==
- “We can’t let this moment pass!”, Columban Interfaith eBulletin, February 2022
- “Grace and Dis-Grace: The Australian Catholic Church’s 70-Year Engagement with Governmental Migration Policy (1948-2018),” in The Church, Migration and Global (In)Difference, Pathways for Ecumenical and Interreligious Dialogue, D Dias et al. (eds) (Palgrave Macmillan, 2021), 347-367.
- “Ordination of Women: A ‘Bridge’ or a ‘Brake’ for Christian Unity?” in Stolen Churches or Bridges to Orthodoxy? Volume 2: Ecumenical and Practical Perspectives on the Orthodox and Eastern Catholic Dialogue, Pathways for Ecumenical and Interreligious Dialogue. V. Latinovic, A. K. Wooden (eds), (Palgrave Macmillan, 2021), 139-160.
- "Be patient, ladies! Be patient!": Women and the Australian Church (WATAC), 1982-2021', The Australasian Catholic Record, 2021, 98(3), pp. 259–283. https://search.informit.org/doi/10.3316/informit.991609482579678
- 'Women Changing the Church: The Experience of the Council for Australian Catholic Women 2000–2019', in Mark D. Chapman & Vladimir Latinovic (eds.), Changing the Church: Transformations of Christian Belief, Practice, and Life. Cham: Springer International Publishing AG, 2020. ISBN 978-3-030-53425-7
- Madigan, P. (2020). Pluralism and Peace: The Religions in Global Civil Society. The Australasian Catholic Record, 97(4), 495–496.
- Cornish, S., & Dean, A. (Eds.). (2019). Still listening to the spirit : woman and man twenty years later. Office for Social Justice of the Australian Catholic Bishops’ Conference.
- 'Women during and after Vatican II', in Vladimir Latinovic, Gerard Mannion & Jason Welle (eds.), Catholicism opening to the world and other confessions: Vatican II and its impact, Palgrave Macmillan, Switzerland, 2018. ISBN 978-3-319-98581-7
- Madigan, P. (2018). "Dialogue derailed: Joseph Ratzinger’s war against pluralist theology". The Australasian Catholic Record, 95(4), 505–507.
- "Hope in Dark Times: Australian Churches Covenanting Together" in Chapman, M. D. (Ed.). (2017). Hope in the ecumenical future (Ser. Pathways for ecumenical and interreligious dialogue). Palgrave Macmillan, 167-182.
- "Graced by Migration: An Australian Perspective" in Padilla, E. (Ed.). (2016). Christianities in migration : the global perspective (Ser. Christianities of the world). Palgrave Macmillan, 135-152.
- '"Nostra Aetate" and fifty years of interfaith dialogue – changes and challenges', Journal of the Australian Catholic Historical Society, 2015, (36), pp. 179–191. https://search.informit.org/doi/10.3316/informit.876592262792089
- Martha Ann Kirk and Patricia Madigan. Iraqi Women of Three Generations : Challenges Education and Hopes for Peace. San Antonio Tex. Houston: Peacecenter ; Gulen Institute, 2013. ISBN 9781502570734
- Women and Fundamentalism in Islam and Catholicism: Negotiating Modernity in a Globalized World. Peter Lang, Bern, 2011, pp. vii + 346. ISBN 978-3-0343-0276-0
- Freedom of religion, gender and belief: a Catholic perspective, 2010, commissioned by the Australian Human Rights Commission for its research and consultation project on Freedom of Religion and Belief in the 21st Century.
- Madigan, P. (2009). Women negotiating modernity: a gender perspective on fundamentalisms in catholicism and islam. Islam and Christian-Muslim Relations, 20(1), 1–20. https://doi.org/10.1080/09596410802542102
- "Traditions and Transformations: Catholic and Muslim Women in Dialogue" in Catholic Women Speak: Bringing Our Gifts to the Tables, edited by Women Speak Networks Catholic, Paulist Press, 2007. ProQuest Ebook Central
- "Festival, Fetes and Flowers: Women Model New Vision in Harare", Women-Church: Australian Journal of Feminist Studies in Religion, no. 24 (1999): 37–41. Digitised version of no. 24 (1999) available on JSTOR Open Community Collections, University of Divinity Digital Collections, Mannix Library
