= Patricia Horsley =

Australian architect and philanthropist (1929–2020)

- Born: July 16, 1930
- Died: January 28, 2021 (aged 90)
- Education: Bachelor of Architecture
- Alma mater: University of Sydney
- Occupations: architect, philanthropist

Patricia Horsley (16 July 1930 – 28 January 2021) was an Australian architect and philanthropist. She was known for her advocacy for women's education and her involvement in progressive Catholic movements.

== Early life and education ==
Patricia (Trish) Horsley was born in 1930. While her family lived in Sydney, they also owned “Gundillawah”, a grazing property at Tumblong, near Gundagi, New South Wales. Coming from a well-off family and never having married or had children, Horsley was afforded expanded opportunities, not available to all women at the time.

She attended the Rose Bay Convent School, run by the Sisters of the Society of the Sacred Heart, which later became the Kincoppal-Rose Bay School of the Sacred Heart. Horsley maintained a lifelong association with both the sisters, the school, and its alumni community, contributing her time and leadership to various projects.

Horsley studied architecture at the University of Sydney, graduating with a Bachelor of Architecture in 1954. When she was in the fifth year of her studies, a local Gundagi paper reported that she had "won great praise" in the Faculty of Architecture, with her work exhibited by the faculty. At the time, the Dean of the Faculty, Professor Henry Ingham Ashworth, said that he did not differentiate between the ability of male and female students, stating that "girls could design any building". Her career and contributions, along with those of other early women architects, are discussed in Bronwyn J. Hanna's doctoral thesis Absence and Presence: a Historiography of Early Women Architects in New South Wales.

While studying at the University of Sydney, Horsley lived at Sancta Sophia College from 1948 to 1953. She remained connected to this college community throughout her life. This included serving on the College Council for 41 years (1964-2005) and advising on various major building projects. A lover of history and the arts, she also supported the college's library and archives and organised several significant art exhibitions.

== Activism and views ==
A lifelong Catholic, Horsley was active in women's reform movements within the Church and had an interest in feminist theology. She was an early member of the feminist organisation Women and the Australian Church (WATAC), which was founded in 1984. Horsley supported the ordination of women in the Catholic Church, a position considered radical at the time. Over the years, she engaged with various groups of progressive Catholics in discussions about women and church issues, both in Australia and overseas. She attended American Academy of Religion conferences and maintained international connections with the Women's Alliance for Theology, Ethics and Ritual (WATER), an educational centre in Silver Spring, Maryland, that focuses on feminist work in religion.

Horsley travelled extensively, including to risky and unusual places such as China during the Maoist era and South America during periods of political protest and unrest.

== Philanthropy ==
Horsley had a deep commitment to the education of women. She was a generous donor to Sancta Sophia College, establishing the "Patricia Horsley Postgraduate Leadership Scholarship", which enabled two students to reside at the College each year, who may otherwise not have been able to.

She was president of the Chapel Society at Kincoppal-Rose Bay School of the Sacred Heart and part of a three-person group that oversaw the complete restoration of the school's Puget Organ. Built in 1890 by the firm of Theodore Puget Pere et Fils of Toulouse, and arriving in Rose Bay in 1904, it was the only organ of its kind in Australia.

Horsley also devised a fundraising initiative for WATAC whereby she donated the proceeds from the sale of male calves born to a designated cow named Miriam; male calves were named Michael. This initiative raised significant funds for WATAC over many years.

== Death and legacy ==
Horsley died on 28 January 2021 at the age of 90.

Her life and work were commemorated at a joint event hosted by Women and the Australian Church (WATAC) and the Women's Alliance for Theology, Ethics and Ritual (WATER). Speakers at the event included American theologian Mary E. Hunt and Australian academics Tracy McEwan and Kathleen McPhillips.
