= Camille Agnes Becker Paul =

Australian feminist and Catholic theologian (1932-2010)

- Born: 1932; Sydney, Australia
- Died: 2010 (aged 77–78)
- Known for: Feminist, Moral Theologian, Activist

Camille Agnes Becker Paul (1932-2010) was an Australian feminist, Catholic moral theologian and activist.

== Early life ==
Camille Agnes Becker was born in Sydney, Australia, in 1932. Her father, Norman Becker, was an engineer who worked on the New South Wales railroad, and her mother, Elsie Childs, was a dressmaker. She was raised in a Catholic family and attended Catholic school for primary education. and later studied to be a secretary, and a physical education trainer. She married Ken Paul in 1956, and had six children with him. Tragically, one of their children, a son, died by drowning in 1972, and one daughter was stillborn. These tragedies caused Paul to question her religious faith.

== Career ==
Paul became interested in counseling, and attended the Roman Catholic Archdiocese of Sydney's Institute of Counseling, from 1975 to 1977. She then attended St. Patrick's Seminary in Manly. She became the second laywoman to obtain a baccalaureate degree in Sacred Theology from the seminary, when she graduated in 1983. She then earned a graduate degree in religious studies from the Catholic College of Education, in Sydney. It was while she was at St Patrick's that Paul became interested in feminism and religion. In 1986, she was awarded a licentiate in sacred theology cum laude for her work on the feminist theologian Mary Daly.

In 1984, she helped found Women and the Australian Church (WATAC), along with Pauline Smith and Patricia Bartley. She co-edited the journal Women-Church: An Australian Journal of Feminist Studies in Religion, from 1989 to 2007.

Paul became a moral theology lecturer at St. Patrick's Seminary in 1985. She taught with Father Thomas Connelly in her first year, and in 1986, she began teaching the course on her own. She was the first woman to teach theology at the seminary. During her career, she also taught at the Catholic Institute of Sydney, and other regional settings.

In 1993, she earned a PhD from the University of Sydney. She published Equal or Different? Women, the Papacy and Social Justice, based on her dissertation, in 1999.

== Death ==
She died in 2010, from colon cancer.

== Select publications ==
- Paul, Camille. "Feminism and stereotypes", Women-Church: Australian Journal of Feminist Studies in Religion, no. 1 (1987): 15-16. Digitised version of no. 1 (1987) available on JSTOR Open Community Collections, University of Divinity Digital Collections, Mannix Library
- Paul, Camille. "Listening to the voice of women", Women-Church: Australian Journal of Feminist Studies in Religion, no. 19 (1996): 29–30. Digitised version of no. 19 (1996) available on JSTOR Open Community Collections, University of Divinity Digital Collections, Mannix Library
