= Marie Tulip =

Australian feminist (1935–2015)

Marie Tulip (12 March 1935 – 19 September 2015) was an Australian feminist writer, academic and proponent for the ordination of women as priests.

== Early and family life ==
Born Marie Grant in Mackay, Queensland to parents Robert and Elspeth Grant, Tulip attended a Presbyterian church as a child. Tulip attended boarding school in Brisbane and later, having received a scholarship, attended the University of Queensland where she studied Arts and achieved an Honours degree in French. As an undergraduate, she participated in Australian Student Christian Movement gatherings with, among others, James (Jim) Tulip (who became Associate Professor of English and Lecturer in Divinity at the University of Sydney). They married in Chicago in 1957. They had four children and, by the time of her death in 2015, five grandchildren.

== Career ==
In Chicago, Tulip undertook a Master's degree at Northwestern University while also teaching at Roosevelt University. Upon her return to Australia, Tulip tutored in the French Department at the University of Sydney and, after a year, transferred to Macquarie University where she produced a series of publications, Outreach Texts, in relation to the University's newly-formed Teaching English as a Second Language course. She went on to teach courses in feminism and religion and published work in these fields.

In 1968, Tulip was a founder of Christian Women Concerned, the first explicitly religious feminist organisation to emerge in Australia. The group published Magdalene, of which Tulip was the editor.

In 1973, Tulip was appointed co-ordinator of the Australian Council of Churches (now the National Council of Churches in Australia) Commission on the Status of Women, an initiative of Jean Skuse. She was also a member of the National Women's Consultative Council, established in 1984.

Tulip's book Knowing otherwise: feminism, women & religion, was co-authored with Erin White and published in 1991. One reviewer, Margaret Heagney described the work as “a vital contribution to feminist scholarship in Australia”.

== Select publications ==
- Hut Poems: 1978–1998. Glebe (NSW): Cerberus Press. 1999.
- Tulip, Marie; Skuse, Jean; Moore, Basil (c. 1975). Liberation theology and feminism. Australian Council of Churches, N.S.W. State Council, Commission on the Status of Women.
- Tulip, Marie; White, Erin (1991). Knowing Otherwise: Feminism, Women and Religion. Melbourne: David Lovell Publishing. ISBN 1-86355-005-4.
- Tulip, Marie (2004). Seven generations of a Queensland family: a memoir. Glebe (NSW).
- Women in a Man's Church: Changes in the Status of Women in the Uniting Church in Australia, 1977–1983. Commission on the Status of Women of the Australian Council of Churches (NSW). 1983. ISBN 0-85821-039-8.

=== Articles ===
- "Dimensions of Feminist Theology in Australia". Women-Church: Australian Journal of Feminist Studies in Religion. 1: 4–9. 1987. JSTOR community.35210469. JSTOR University of Divinity Digital Collections, Mannix Library.
- "Women's Spirituality". Women-Church: Australian Journal of Feminist Studies in Religion. 5: 23–28. 1989. JSTOR community.35210482. JSTOR University of Divinity Digital Collections, Mannix Library.
- "Feminism and the Bible". Women-Church: Australian Journal of Feminist Studies in Religion. 8: 30–35. 1991. JSTOR community.35210499. JSTOR University of Divinity Digital Collections, Mannix Library.
