= Elaine Lindsay =

Australian academic and feminist theologian

- Born: 1948 (age 77–78)
- Occupations: academic, feminist theologian

Academic background
- Education: University of Sydney (Master of Public Policy, MA, PhD); Macquarie University (Postgraduate Diploma in Children’s Literature); Flinders University (BA)
- Thesis: Rewriting God: Spirituality in Contemporary Australian Women's Fiction (1996)

Academic work
- Discipline: Literature, Spirituality
- Sub-discipline: Australian literature
- Institutions: Australian Catholic University
- Main interests: Australian literature, Spirituality, feminist theology

Elaine Stuart Lindsay (born 1948) is an Australian academic whose work has focussed on literature and feminist theology. She was instrumental in the development of the Women-Church journal which provided publishing opportunities in feminist theology for Australian women.

== Early life and education ==
Elaine Stuart Lindsay was born in 1948 in Adelaide, South Australia. She studied at St Peter's Collegiate Girls' School in Adelaide.

Lindsay has a Bachelor of Arts from Flinders University and a Postgraduate Diploma in Children's Literature from Macquarie University. She has a Post-Graduate Certificate in Higher Education from Australian Catholic University.

She also has a Master of Public Policy, Master of Arts, and PhD from University of Sydney. Her thesis was published as Rewriting God: Spirituality in Contemporary Australian Women's Fiction (2000).

== Career ==
Lindsay began her career as a radio producer, announcer and interviewer. From 1974 to 1978, Lindsay worked as a broadcaster on Radio Adelaide, with a focus on topics related to arts and literature. In 1978, she became the Senior Project Officer for the Literature Board of the Australia Council, a role she held until 1994.

Lindsay taught English Literature at Australian Catholic University between 1996 and 1997. Between 1997 and 2009, she was a program manager for Literature and History for Arts NSW.

From 2009, she was an executive officer at the Australian Catholic University (ACU). In 2011, Lindsay became the research development coordinator in the Faculty of Arts and Sciences at ACU. She was appointed as senior lecturer in literature in the Faculty of Education and Arts in 2016. Lindsay retired from teaching in 2021.

Lindsay taught feminist theology at the University of Sydney. She has been an active member of the Movement for the Ordination of Women (MOW) since the late 1980s, including as a member of the Sydney committee and, since 2018, National Secretary. In 2022 she was elected National President of MOW. Lindsay was also co-editor of the Women-Church journal from 1992 to 2007. In 1990 and 1992 Lindsay edited publications based on two national feminist theology conferences, Towards a Feminist Theology and Women Authoring Theology. These conferences were organised by MOW, Women and the Australian Church, Women-Church, and the Feminist Uniting Network.

Lindsay was co-editor of Preachers, Prophets and Heretics which detailed the history of the movement for the ordination of women in the Australian Anglican church. The book was shortlisted for the Australian Christian Book of the Year Awards in 2013. The book has been described as inspiring, a well-presented and significant collection, as well as well-researched and substantiated. Lindsay is praised personally for her introductory chapter which honours Patricia Brennan, the first president of the Movement for the Ordination of Women (MOW).

Lindsay developed the AustLit service reselling books from publishers that were not stocked in bookstores. She has chaired the judging panel for the Voss Literary Prize for the best Australian novel since 2016. Lindsay also co-convened international conferences on Religion, Literature and the Arts at Australian Catholic University with Michael Griffith.

== Select publications ==
- Lindsay, Elaine. "Barbara Hanrahan". Australian Dictionary of Biography, volume 19, 1991–1995 (ANU Press, 2021). doi:10.22459/ADB19
- Lindsay, Elaine. "Fiction: Australian Fiction and Religion." In ed. Lindsay Jones et al., The Encyclopedia of Religion 2nd edition (Farmington Hills, MI: Macmillan Reference USA, Thomson Gale, 2004).
- Lindsay, Elaine. Rewriting God: Spirituality in contemporary Australian women's fiction. No. 45. Rodopi, 2000. ISBN 9789042015821
- Lindsay, Elaine. "Figuring the Sacred Geography, Spirituality and Literature." Kunapipi 17, no. 2 (1995): 15.
- Lindsay, Elaine. "Reading Thea Astley: from Catholicism to post/Christian feminism." Antipodes 9, no. 2 (1995): 119–122.
- Lindsay, Elaine. (1994). "A Mystic in her Garden: Spirituality and the Fiction of Barbara Hanrahan." In Claiming Our Rites: Studies in Religion by Australian Women Scholars. Eds. Morny Joy & Penelope Magee (19–35). www.austlit.edu.au/austlit/page/C401191 ISBN 0908083181

=== Articles ===
- Lindsay, Elaine. "'As one whom his mother comforteth, so will I comfort you.' Elizabeth Jolley's catalogue of consolation." Southerly 66, no.1 (2006): 52–65.
- Lindsay, Elaine. "Sexing the Spiritual." Social Alternatives 24, no. 2 (2005): 32–35.
- Lindsay, Elaine. "Deconstructing Jesus in recent Australian women's fiction", Women-Church: Australian Journal of Feminist Studies in Religion, no. 37 (2005): 30–36. Digitised version of no. 37 (2005) available on JSTOR Open Community Collections, University of Divinity Digital Collections, Mannix Library
- Lindsay, Elaine. "Spiritual Subversions." Australian Feminist Studies 14, no. 30 (1999): 357–366.
- Lindsay, Elaine. "Friend Death: Gendered Perceptions of Death in Australian Writing." Australian Religion Studies Review 10, no. 1 (1997): 28–37. openjournals.library.usyd.edu.au/index.php/ARSR/article/view/8419/8545
- Lindsay, Elaine. "On First Looking into Barbara Hanrahan's Diaries: ‘The Terrible Creative Task'." Literature and Theology 10, no. 3 (1996): 230–237.
- Lindsay, Elaine. "Reading Thea Astley: From Catholicism to Post-Christian Feminism." Antipodes 9, no. 2 (1995): 119–122.
- Lindsay, Elaine. "Finding a Voice: From The Diaries of Barbara Hanrahan." Southerly 55, no. 3 (1995): 114–130.
- Lindsay, Elaine. "Figuring the Sacred: Geography, Spirituality and Literature." Kunapipi XVII, no. 2 (1995): 60–67.

=== Co-written and edited ===
- Lindsay, Elaine and Michael Griffith. (June 2017). Literature and Theology Special Issue: Grounding the Sacred in Literature and the Arts in Australia. ISSN 0269-1205
- Phillips, Debra and Lindsay, Elaine. (2017). Using diary writing: a narrative of radical courage. TEXT: Journal of Writing and Writing Programs.
- Phillips, Debra and Lindsay, Elaine. (2017). Be-yond becoming: the shared features of art-making and constructing a narrative of the imagined future. Life Writing. doi:10.1080/14484528.2017.1296752
- Lindsay, Elaine and Michael Griffith. (2014). Journal of the Association for the Study of Australian Literature (JASAL), David Malouf 14 no. 2.
- Lindsay, Elaine, and Janet Christine Scarfe. Preachers, Prophets and Heretics: Anglican Women's Ministry. University of New South Wales Press Ltd, 2012. ISBN 9781742233376
- Lindsay, Elaine. "The Diaries of Barbara Hanrahan." (1998). ISBN 9780702228926
- Lindsay, Elaine, and John Murray (1997–98). "'Whether this is Jerusalem or Babylon we know not.': National Self-Discovery in Remembering Babylon." Southerly 57, no. 4: 94–102.
- Lindsay, Elaine. Women authoring theology: papers and proceedings from a national conference called together by MOW, National WATAC, Women-Church, Feminist Uniting Network, 24–26 May 1991. Petersham, 1991.
- Lindsay, Elaine. Towards a feminist theology: papers and proceedings from a national conference called together by MOW, National WATAC, Women-Church, 18–20 August 1989, Collaroy Centre, Sydney. Helensburgh, 1990. [edited by Elaine Lindsay; illustrations by Bernice Moore; photos by Helen Leonard]
