= Bernice Moore =

Australian educator (1934–2026)

Personal life
- Born: Bernice Moore
- Parent(s): Stan and Nell Moore

Religious life
- Religion: Christianity
- Denomination: Roman Catholic
- Order: Sisters of the Good Samaritan

Bernice Moore OAM (4 September 1934 – 1 January 2026) was an Australian educator and formerly Sister of the Good Samaritan, known as Sister Bede, from Sydney. She was known for her significant contributions to the fields of education, feminist theology and social justice. Moore was awarded the Medal of the Order of Australia in 1997.

== Biography ==
Bernice Constant Moore grew up in a Catholic family in Sydney, the child of Nell and Stan Moore. Her parents influenced her life-long interest in the connection between faith and social justice. Moore studied art and taught it for many years. In the early 1980s she completed a Masters in Feminist Studies at the University of New South Wales.

Moore entered the order of the Sisters of the Good Samaritan and as a religious sister taught in secondary schools in Canberra, Victoria and Queensland for thirty-five years. The Congregation of the Sisters of the Good Samaritan was the first religious congregation for women founded in Australia, having been established in 1857 by John Bede Polding, the Archbishop of Sydney. Members of this order follow the rule of Saint Benedict. Polding established the order to respond to the needs of poor women and children in Sydney, and the order focused on charitable works and education. Moore remained a religious sister for forty years but left the order in 1986.

In the 1980s, Moore worked in adult education as a member of the National Mission and Justice Education Team, set up by the Catholic bishops of Australia. This group produced a Mission and Justice Education Programme that was noted as ground breaking. She also studied for her Masters in Women’s Studies at University of New South Wales.

In 1993, Moore was one of the first directors elected to the Australian Feminist Theology Foundation. The group had been established in 1991 to improve the situation of women in church and society by providing financial resources to develop feminist theology and practice.

Moore was awarded the Medal of the Order of Australia in the 1997 Australia Day Honours for "service to children with disabilities at the Regency park School, and to the community through Meals On Wheels and Trees for Life."

Moore was an active member of Women and the Australian Church (WATAC), as one of the group's founding members and its national president for fifteen years. In 2003, when she retired from her position as fulltime coordinator of WATAC NSW, a garden party was held to honour her outstanding commitment to WATAC. She continued to work for the association in a voluntary capacity for a further fifteen years. Moore wrote a history of WATAC in an article published in the Australian feminist theology journal Women-Church in 2007. At WATAC's Annual General meeting in 2021, she was awarded Life membership.

Moore also served as a member on the Gender Commission for the National Council of Churches during the 2000s.

Moore has been interviewed on several occasions on Australian Broadcasting Corporation Radio National, including a program about perceptions of Mary in 2004 and one on the Assumption of Mary in 2008. Moore was the Convenor of Catholics in Coalition for Peace and Justice (CCPJ) NSW between 1991 and 1999. In 2010, the Coalition presented their annual CCPJ Award to Moore in recognition of her long and dedicated commitment to social justice and peace.

== Selected publications ==
- Moore, Bernice (2007). "WATAC herstory 1982-2007". Women-Church: An Australian Journal of Feminist Studies in Religion. 40: 96–101. https://search.informit.org/doi/10.3316/ielapa.200709501 Digitised version of v. 40 (2007) available on JSTOR Open Community Collections University of Divinity Digital Collections, Mannix Library.
- Knowlden, Margaret; illustrations Moore, Bernice (2001) Strike before the iron is hot: a light-hearted, but deadly serious, look at the 'home ironing' industry (2nd ed.). Little Red Apple Publishing. ISBN 9781875329274
- Movement for the Ordination of Women (Australia). National Conference (5th: 1989: Sydney, N.S.W), Women and the Australian Church. National Conference (2nd: 1989: Sydney, N.S.W.), & Women-Church (Organization) (1990). Towards a Feminist Theology: Papers and Proceedings from a National Conference called together by MOW, National WATAC, Women-Church, 18–20 August 1989, Collaroy Centre, Sydney / [edited by Elaine Lindsay; illustrations by Bernice Moore; photos by Helen Leonard] ISBN 9780731698790 Towards a Feminist Theology on JSTOR Open Community Collections, University of Divinity Digital Collections, Mannix Library
