= Erin White =

Erin White may refer to:

- Erin White (softball)
- Erin White (feminist theologian)
- Erin Margaret White, namesake of the minor planet Erinwhite
