= Fluffy bunny =

"Fluffy Bunny" may refer to:

== Entertainment ==
- Another term for the eating game, also known as Chubby bunny.
- Characters from the comic strip Pogo, who only appeared in alternate "filler" strips that newspapers were provided if they considered the regular strips too controversial.

== Religion ==
- Fluffy bunny - a derogatory term used by Wiccans

== Zoology ==
- An affectionate, informal name for a Rabbit
