= Jean Skuse =

Australian church worker

Jean Skuse AO MBE
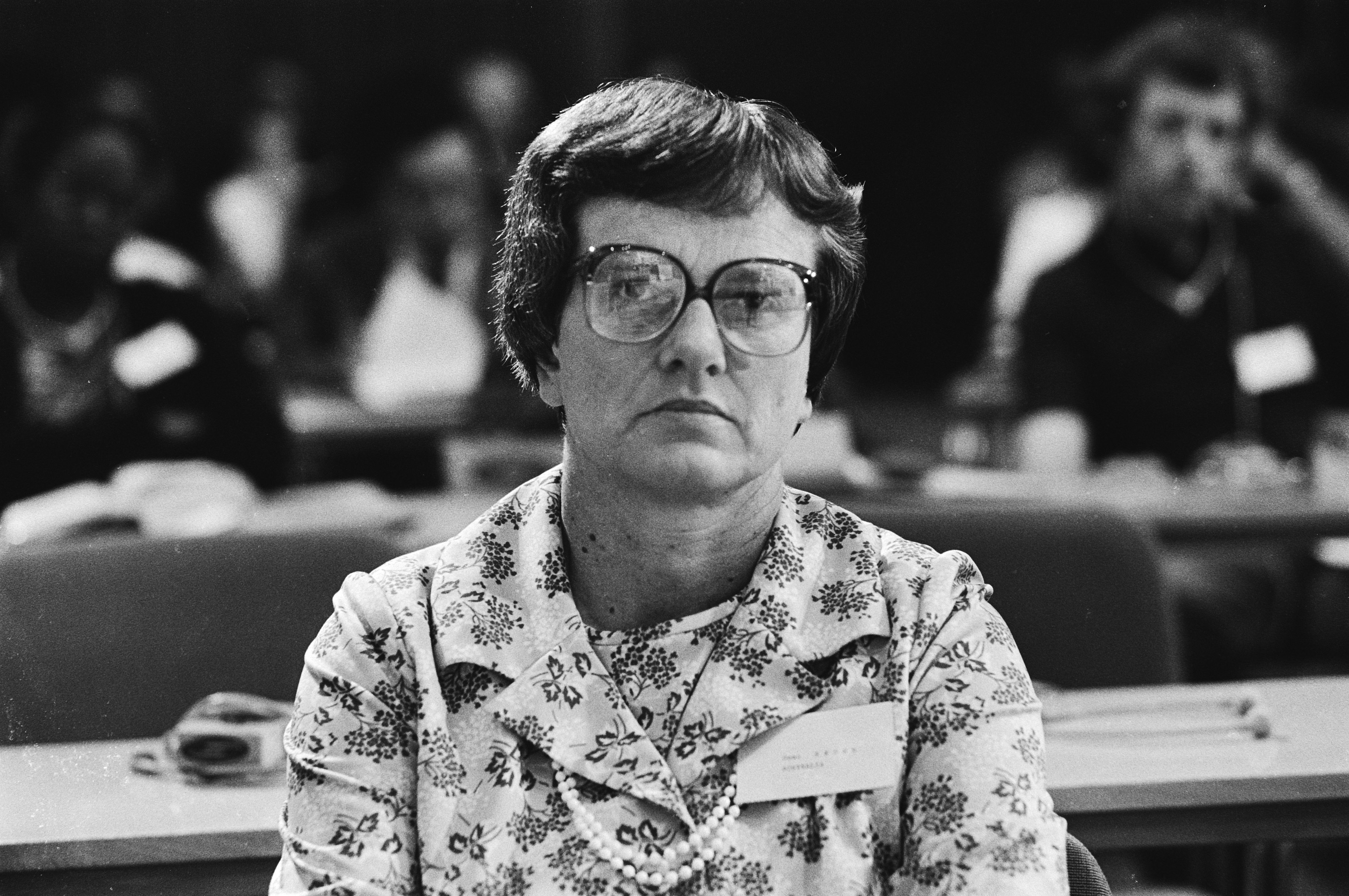
- Jean Skuse (1980)
- Born: 1 January 1932 (age 94)
- Occupation: Australian Christian Church Official

Jean Enid Skuse AO MBE (born 1 January 1932) is an Australian Christian leader and ecumenist who served as the general secretary of the Australian Council of Churches and the Vice-Moderator of the Central Committee of the World Council of Churches (WCC).

== Life ==
=== Early life ===
Jean Skuse was born in 1932, and grew up in New South Wales. She was raised in the Methodist faith, as her father was a Methodist minister. She began her professional life in accounting and auditing, working in this field from 1949 to 1963 in Sydney, Australia, and in London, England.

=== Church work ===
In 1963, Skuse became the administrator of a girl's hostel in Waverley, a suburb of Sydney, that was managed by the Methodist church. This marked the beginning of her long-career working for organizations connected to the Methodist Church, and later, the wider ecumenical movement. From 1969 to 1970, she worked as an observer to the United Nations, for the newly formed United Methodist Church in the United States, which was established in 1968 through a merger between two American churches with similar Methodist roots. In 1970, she was appointed to the UN Commission on the Status of Women. She was international secretary of the World Conference of Methodist Women from 1971 until 1976, and also served as a member of the executive of the World Methodist Council.

In 1971, Skuse was appointed executive secretary of the New South Wales Council of Churches. She became General Secretary of the Australian Council of Churches (ACC) in 1975 and served in this post until 1988. She was the first woman to serve as the head of the ACC.

Skuse attended the World Council of Churches' fifth Assembly held in Nairobi in 1975. At this global gathering of ecumenical leaders, she was elected as Vice-Moderator of the Central Committee of the WCC, a post she held from 1975 to 1983. In 1988, she became the national co-ordinator for the seventh WCC Assembly, which was held in Canberra, Australia in 1991.

Skuse was a member of the group Christian Women Concerned, which was the first explicitly religious feminist organisation in Australia. This small ecumenical group also included Marie Tulip and Dorothy McRae-McMahon and together the group published the Magdalene (newsletter) from 1973 to 1987.

== Awards and recognition ==
In 1978, Skuse was awarded the Queen Elizabeth II Silver Jubilee medal. The following year, in June 1979, she was made a Member of the Order of the British Empire (MBE). For the 1992 Australia Day Honours, Skuse was elevated to an Officer of the Order of Australia (AO) for "service to religion, particularly through the World Council of Churches, and to women's affairs".

Some of Skuse's personal papers are held at the National Library of Australia. An interview with Skuse, conducted by Australian historian Hazel de Berg in 1977, is also held at the National Library of Australia.

== Works ==
- To See With One's Own Eyes. Sydney: Australian Council of Churches, 1982.
