= List of Religious Education Association presidents =

The following is a list of the presidents and executive secretaries of the Religious Education Association.

The Religious Education Association is a nonprofit member association, serving as a professional and learned society for scholars and researchers involved in the field of religious education. In 2003 it merged formally with the Association of Professors and Researchers in Religious Education. Up until that date, REA presidents could serve for more than a year at a time, while APRRE presidents served for only one year at a time. At the moment of merger, presidential terms were limited to one year and "practitioners" was added to the title of the organization, making it the "Religious Education Association: An Association of Professors, Practitioners and Researchers in Religious Education" (REA: APPRRE).

== Presidents of the REA ==
- 1903-04 : Frank Knight Sanders
- 1904-05 : Charles Cuthbert Hall
- 1905-06 : William Fraser McDowell
- 1906-07 : William Hubert P. Faunce
- 1907-08 : Henry Churchill King
- 1908-09 : Francis Greenwood Peabody
- 1909-10 : George Albert Coe
- 1910-11 : William Lawrence
- 1911-12 : James Hampton Kirkland
- 1912-13 : Harry Pratt Judson
- 1913-14 : Charles Franklin Thwing
- 1914-15 : Charles David Williams
- 1915-16 : George Black Stewart
- 1916-17 : Francis J. McConnell
- 1917-18 : Washington Gladden
- 1918-19 : Samuel A. Elliott
- 1919-21 : Arthur C. McGiffert
- 1921-24 : Theodore G. Soares
- 1924-26 : Donald J. Cowling
- 1926-28 : Robert A. Falconer
- 1928-31 : William Adams Brown
- 1931-33 : John H. Finley
- 1933-35 : Herbert N. Shenton
- 1935-39 : Hugh Hartshorne
- 1940-42 : Harrison Elliott
- 1942-44 : Ernest Chave
- 1944-46 : F. Ernest Johnson
- 1946-48 : Ernest W. Kuebler
- 1948-55 : Samuel P. Franklin
- 1955-57 : George N. Shuster
- 1957-62 : Jerome Kerwin
- 1962-67 : Philip Scharper
- 1967-69 : David R. Hunter
- 1969-72 : Oswald P. Bronson, Sr.
- 1972-75 : Sr. Ann Ida Gannon, BVM
- 1975-77 : Rabbi David Wolf Silverman
- 1977-79 : Emily V. Gibbs
- 1979-81 : Henry C. Simmons, C.P.
- 1981-85 : Rabbi Walter Jacob
- 1985-89 : Joanne Chafe
- 1989-1993 : Mary Elizabeth Moore
- 1993-97 : Stephen B. Scharper
- 1997-99 : Noel B. Shuell
- 1999-2000 : Sherry Blumberg
- 2000-02 : Ronald H. Cram

== Presidents of the APRRE ==
- 1970-71 : Allen J. Moore
- 1971-72 : Neely D. McCarter
- 1972-73 : C. Ellis Nelson
- 1973-74 : Iris V. Cully
- 1974-75 : Berard L. Marthaler
- 1975-76 : Gerald A. Slusser
- 1976-77 : Norma H. Thompson
- 1977-78 : Clarence H. Snelling, Jr.
- 1978-79 : Mary Charles Bryce, O.S.B.
- 1979-80 : David S. Stewart
- 1980-81 : Margaret Webster
- 1981-82 : Charles F. Melchert
- 1982-83 : Lucie W. Barber
- 1983-84 : Donald M. Joy
- 1984-85 : Taylor Mcconnell
- 1985-86 : Joanmarie Smith
- 1986-87 : Richard A. Olson
- 1987-88 : Maria Harris
- 1988-89 : Robert Browning
- 1989-90 : Gloria Durka
- 1990-91 : Gabriel Moran
- 1991-92 : William B. Kennedy
- 1992-93 : Susanne Johnson
- 1993-94 : Stephen Schmidt
- 1994-95 : Mary C. Boys
- 1995-96 : Charles Foster
- 1996-97 : Fayette Breaux Veverka
- 1997-98 : Mary Elizabeth Mullino Moore
- 1998-99 : Thomas Groome
- 1999-2000 : Sara S. Lee
- 2000-01 : Jack Seymour
- 2001-02 : Greer A. Wenh-In Ng

== Presidents of the REA:APPRRE ==
- 2002-03 : Anne Streaty Wimberly
- 2003-04 : Lorna Bowman
- 2004-05 : Robert O’Gorman
- 2005-06 : Ronnie Prevost
- 2006-07 : Margaret Ann Crain
- 2007-08 : José Irizarry
- 2008-09 : Carol Lakey Hess
- 2009-10 : Maureen O’ Brien
- 2010-11 : Mary Hess
- 2011-12 : Dean Blevins
- 2012-13 : Yolanda Smith
- 2013-14 : Siebren Miedema
- 2014-15 : Mai-Anh Le Tran
- 2015-16 : Harold (Bud) Horell
- 2016-17: Bert Roebben
- 2017-2018: Mualla Selcuk
- 2018-2019: Kathy Winings
- 2019-2020: Hanan Alexander
- 2020-2021: Boyung Lee
- 2022-2023: Patrick B. Reyes
- 2023-2024: Anne Walker
- 2024-2026: Karen-Marie Yust

== REA General Secretaries ==
- 1970-82 : Boardman (Barney) Kathan
- 1982-85 : Randolph Crump Miller
- 1985-87 : Dorothy Savage
- 1987-92 : Donald T. Russo
- 1992-97 : Barbara B. Ryan
- 1997-2002 : Ronald Cram

== Executive Secretaries, APRRE ==
- 1970-90 : Donald F. Williams
- 1990-91 : Clarisse Croteau-Chonka and Burton Everist
- 1991-94 : Padraic O’Hare
- 1994-2001 : Charles F. Melchert
- 2001-03 : Randy Litchfield

== Executive Secretaries, REA:APPRRE ==
- 2002-03 : Randy Litchfield
- 2004-06 : Lawanda Smith
- 2006-10 : W. Alan Smith
- 2010–2020 : Lucinda Huffaker
- 2020-2024 : Lakisha Lockhart
- 2024-Present : Jennifer Moe
