= Margaret MacRory =

Australian religious sister (1862 – 1931)

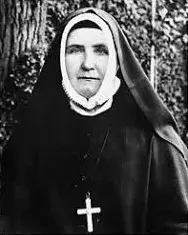
- Born: December 18, 1862; Ballygawley, County Tyrone
- Died: May 23, 1931 (aged 68); Darlington
- Other name: Mother MacRory
- Occupation: College Principal
- Known for: creating Sancta Sophia College, University of Sydney

Margaret MacRory became Mother MacRory (18 December 1862 – 23 May 1931) was an Irish born Australian religious sister of Society of the Sacred Heart of Jesus. She became the headmistress of the school in Rose Bay. She organised the building, and she was in charge of the Sancta Sophia College at the University of Sydney when it opened in the 1920s.

== Life ==
MacRory was born in 1862 in Ballygawley, and she was one of ten children of Francis MacRory, a farmer, and his second wife, Rose (née Montague) MacRory. Her elder brother Joseph MacRory was born in 1861; he joined the priesthood in 1885 and would become a cardinal.

She became a novice of the Society of the Sacred Heart of Jesus in Roehampton in 1881. She was sent briefly to France before she arrived on 4 November 1885 at Sydney. There she was a teacher at the school that was part of the Convent of the Sacred Heart, Rose Bay (now part of Kincoppal School). She was professed in 1890.

She became headmistress of the school in Sydney's Rose Bay.

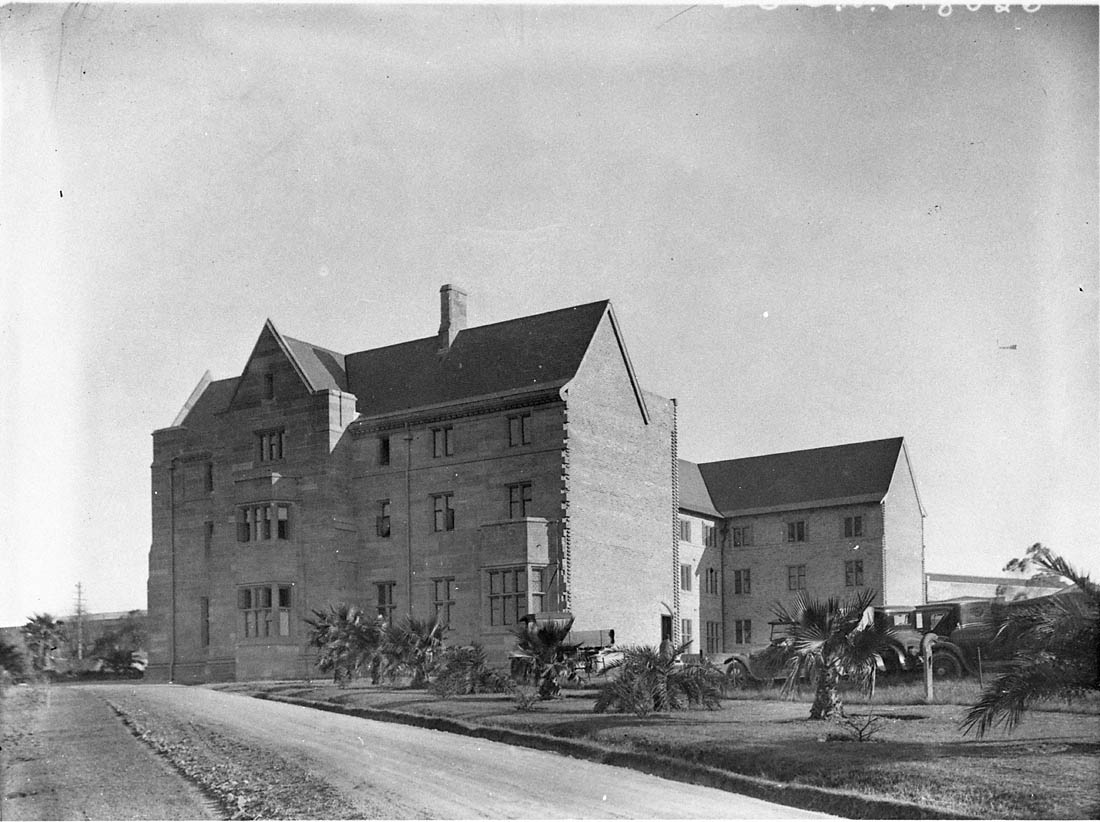
Sancta Sophia in the late 1920s.

In 1923, she began her association with the University of Sydney when she opened a house for women students on City Road in Darlington. She was then sent to Rome. She returned from Europe where she had been reunited with her elder brother, Joseph, to lead the construction of a hall that would become Sancta Sophia College at the University of Sydney. The hall was built on land owned by St John's College and some thought it was just an extension. In fact, there is a plaque dedicating the building to St John. She chose the college motto of "Walk in Wisdom" and the college's crest that features "Truth" and "Wisdom". The college opened with her as principal in 1926, and the following year a new wing was added.

MacRory died in 1931 in Camperdown.
