= Dorothy McRae-McMahon =

Retired Australian Uniting Church minister, activist

Dorothy McRae-McMahon (born 1934) is a retired Australian Uniting Church minister and activist, formerly Minister at Pitt Street Uniting Church—known for its human rights work and local "street level" activism.

McRae-McMahon has been a feminist Christian activist since the 1970s. Involved in women's liberation, human rights, anti-apartheid, anti-Vietnam War and in religious and spiritual matters.

Coming out as a lesbian at the age of 50, McRae-McMahon created a major stir and homophobic attacks, engendering public discussion and acceptance of homosexual clergy.

McRae-McMahon volunteers at a Uniting Church parish, co-edits the South Sydney Herald, speaks at public forums and writes.

== Early life, marriage and children ==
Dorothy McRae was born in 1934 in Zeehan, Tasmania, Australia, where her Methodist Minister father had been appointed to his first parish. She married Barrie McMahon in 1956 and lived in Melbourne, Victoria. Originally a pre-school teacher, McRae-McMahon spent 16 years at home caring for her four children, born between 1957 and 1969: Christopher Barrie, Robert Anthony, Lindy Louise and Melissa. The eldest, Christopher had an intellectual disability and went into autistic withdrawal shortly after Robert's birth. In 1964, the family moved to Sydney, where McRae-McMahon joined the Australian Labor Party and became involved in peace activism.

In 1987, McRae-McMahon ended her marriage, recognising herself as a lesbian, an identity she made public in 1997, declaring that she had been living in a committed same-sex relationship for many years.

== Work and activism ==
McRae-McMahon began her training in the ordained ministry of the Uniting Church in 1976. On ordination in 1982, she was appointed to Sydney's Pitt Street Church where she gathered a congregation committed to a range of activist causes. Their involvement in the anti-apartheid cause attracted the attention of right wing group National Action, which led to a campaign of harassment against the Minister and her congregation.

McRae-McMahon has been a Minister in the Uniting Church, a National Director for Mission of the Uniting Church in Australia (1993) and was the first woman to become Moderator of the World Council of Churches Worship Committee. She was instrumental in 'Mothers and Others for Peace', 'Christian Women Concerned', the first Church Commission on the Status of Women and the publication of the Australian Christian feminist magazine Magdalene (newsletter).

In 1997, McRae-McMahon came out as a lesbian at the National Assembly of the Uniting Church in Perth. She resigned from her position later that year. An episode of Australian Story was broadcast by the Australian Broadcasting Corporation about her life, family and relationship with the Uniting Church.

McRae-McMahon became a leader in the successful campaign to have homosexual ministers formally accepted by the Uniting Church, arguing that homosexuality is a sign of wholeness rather than moral decay.

McRae-McMahon had occupied a position of power within the Uniting Church but found she was more comfortable embracing a theology of moving to the edge—believing 'the margins are the places where Christ is closest to us'.

== Published works ==
- McRae-McMahon, D. (1993) "Echoes of our Journey: liturgies of the people", Joint Board of Christian Education: Melbourne, Vic
- McRae-McMahon, D. (1992, 1994). "Being Clergy, Staying Human, taking our stand in the river", Alban Institute: Washington DC
- McRae-McMahon, D. (1996) "The Glory of Blood, Sweat and tears: liturgies for living and dying", Joint Board of Christian Education: Melbourne, Vic
- McCrae-McMahon, D. (1998) "Everyday Passions: A Conversation on Living", ABC Books: Sydney, NSW
- McRae-McMahon, D. (2000). "Embracing Diversity: new communities of justice in the 21st century", Anglicare : Hobart, Tasmania
- McRae-McMahon, D. (2000) "Liturgies for the Journey of Life", SPCK: London
- McRae-McMahon, D., Fidler, R. and Cleary, P. (2001) "What Kind of Republic for Australia?: Direct electionists discuss models and strategies in the aftermath of the 1999 referendum defeat", A Just Republic: Broadway, NSW
- McRae-McMahon, D. (2001). "Prayers for life's particular moments", Desbooks, Thornbury, Vic
- McRae-McMahon, D. (2001). "Daring Leadership for the 21st Century", ABC Books, Sydney, NSW
- McRae-McMahon, D. (2001). "In this Hour: memories for pausing", Desbooks: Thornbury, Vic
- Maher, T., McRae-McMahon, D., McAvoy, T. (2002) "Why an Australian Republic needs a Bill of Rights", A Just Republic: Broadway, NSW
- McRae-McMahon, D. (2003, 2010) "Rituals for Life, Love, Loss", Jane Curry Publishing, Paddington, NSW
- McRae-McMahon, D. (2004) "Memoirs of Moving On: A life of faith, passion and resilience", Jane Curry Publishing, Paddington, NSW
- McRae-McMahon, D. (2004) "Liturgies for Daily Life", SPCK: London
- McRae-McMahon, D. (2005) "Worship for the Young in Years", Mediacom Education: Adelaide, SA
- McRae-McMahon, D. (2007). "Liturgies for high days", Mediacom Education, Unley, SA
- Gale, F., Bolzan, N., McRae-McMahon, D., (Ed) (2007) "Spirited Practices: spirituality and the helping professions", Allen & Unwin: Crows Nest, NSW
- McRae-McMahon, D. (2009) "In life and in death: liturgies for harder times", Mediacom Education: Unley, SA
- McRae-McMahon, D. and Sydney Barbara Metrick (2014). "Rituals for Life, Love and Loss: Prayers and Meditations for Marriage, Birthdays, Baby Naming Loss and grief", Turner House an imprint of Turner Publishing Company: NY
- McRae-McMahon, D. (2013) "A life and death conversation with Ali", Mediacom Education: Unley, SA
- McRae-McMahon, D. (2015) "Deeply Connected: how to write liturgy", Mediacom Education Inc : Unley, SA

=== Contributions ===
- McRae-McMahon, with Tony Fitzgerald QC and John Uhr, contributed the foreword to Noel Preston's 2006 book, "Beyond the Boundary : a memoir exploring ethics, politics and spirituality", Zeus publications : Burleigh, Queensland.

== Honours, decorations, awards and distinctions ==
- 1977: Jubilee Medal from the Queen for work with women in NSW.
- 1987: Australian Government Peace Medal.
- 1988: Australian Human Rights Medal.
- 1992: Honorary Doctorate of Letters from Macquarie University for her work with minorities and contribution to the spiritual life of the community.
- 2014: Grand Stirrer award recipient, Edna Ryan Awards.
- 2016: Community Hero Award ACON Awards.
