= Fluffy bunny (Wicca) =

Derogatory term in Wicca

In the Wiccan religion, the term "fluffy bunny" is used as a derogatory term to refer to practitioners whose adherence to the faith is perceived as being superficial and dominated by consumerist values. In doing so, it contrasts the speakers' perception that their own practice of Wicca is authentic, as opposed to that of the inauthentic "fluffy bunny". The usage of the term has been examined by a number of academics operating in the field of Pagan studies.

== Definitions ==
Angela Coco and Ian Woodward studied a 2002 discussion thread in which Wiccan participants debated what it meant to be a "fluffy bunny". They concluded that the participants associated a number of traits with those they labelled as "fluffy bunnies": "pragmatic, profiteering, dabbling, modern, superficial, peripheral to community, playful, and using multimedia to further practical and capitalist values." For many of those contributing to the thread, the term "fluffy bunny" was "linked to the person who is uninformed, immature, and lacking in their understanding of the forces of nature and consequently dangerous because they may misuse magic." They added that in this thread, a minority of participants defended the legitimacy of "fluffy bunnies" to practice Wicca as they saw fit, highlighting that not all practitioners have the same level of experience and involvement in the religion. They also noted that various practitioners expressed the opinion or hope that no-one would think that they themselves were "fluffy bunnies". Ultimately, they thought that the term "fluffy bunny" was a trope used "to invoke a generally felt collective consciousness of an "authentic pagan" identity".

Since the religion's rise in popularity, several pejorative terms such as "fluffy bunny" or the "old lady brigade" have been used in the Wiccan and Neo-Pagan community to describe adherents that they view as superficial or faddish. Common descriptions given by people using the term include elements such as the practitioner deliberately choosing to emphasize goodness, light, eclecticism and elements taken from the New Age movement over elements seen as too dark, as well as the practitioner appearing to follow the religion as a fad. The term "fluffy bunny" became more prevalent in the 1990s after it was used to describe a depiction of the Wiccan religion in the television series Buffy the Vampire Slayer. The show, which featured a Wiccan coven, raised ire from practitioners of Wicca who believe that the coven in the show reinforced stereotypes.

== See also ==
- Modern paganism and New Age
