= Sancta Sophia College, University of Sydney =

University residential college

Sancta Sophia College
- University of Sydney
- Location: University of Sydney, CG7, 8 Missenden Road, Camperdown NSW 2050
- Coordinates: 33°53′14.15″S 151°10′50.45″E
- Motto: In Sapienta Ambulate (Latin)
- Motto in English: Walk in Wisdom
- Established: 1925; 101 years ago
- Named for: Saint Madeleine Sophie Barat, founder of the Society of the Sacred Heart
- Principal: Fiona Hastings
- Vice principal: Brigid Carrigan
- Undergraduates: 170
- Postgraduates: 128
- Website: www.sanctasophiacollege.edu.au

Sancta Sophia College (colloquially as Sancta) is a residential college for undergraduate women and postgraduate men and women at the University of Sydney. The college has a Catholic foundation but admits students of all religions. Fiona Hastings has been the principal of the college since 2018.

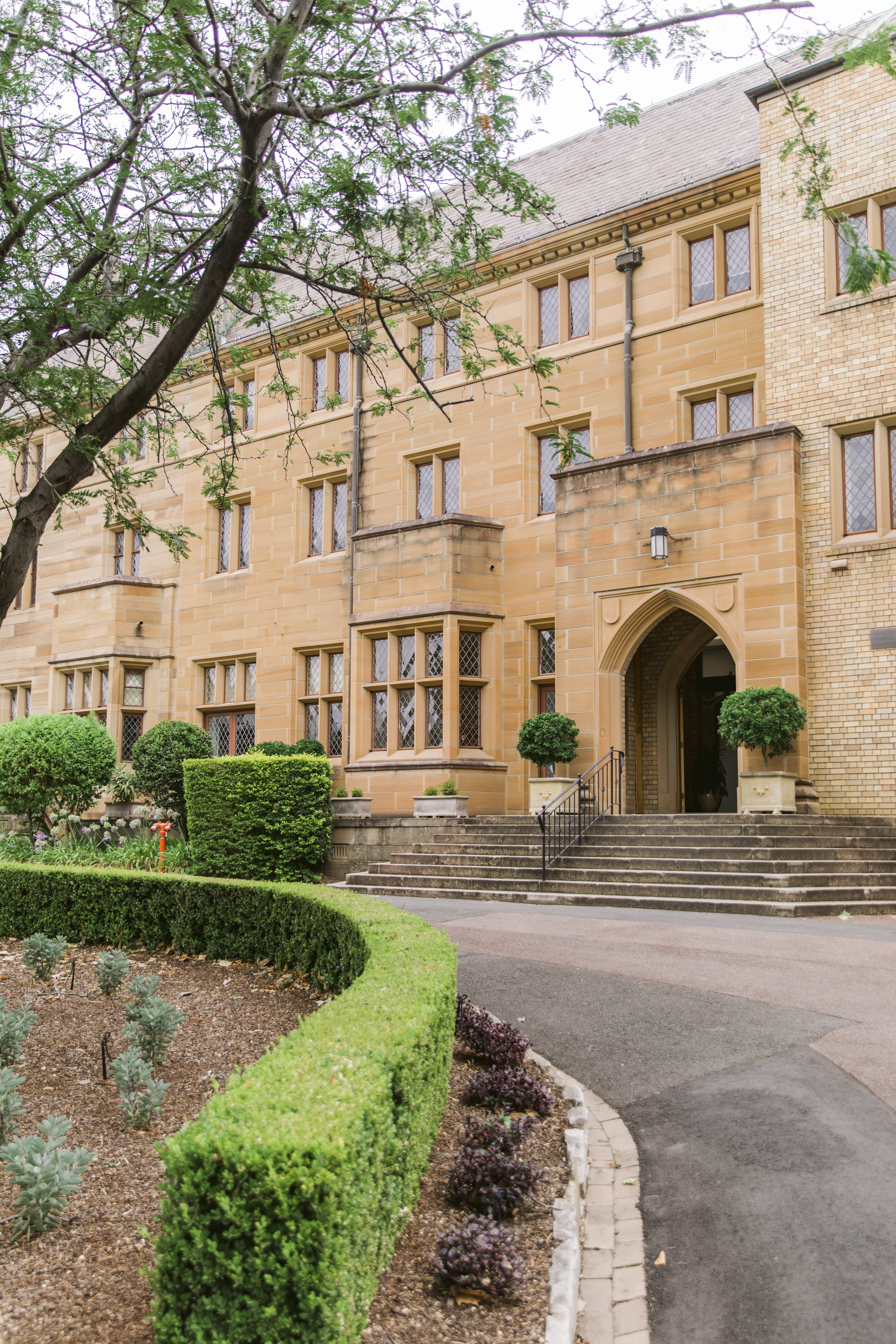
The College's Main Entrance

== History ==
=== Foundation ===
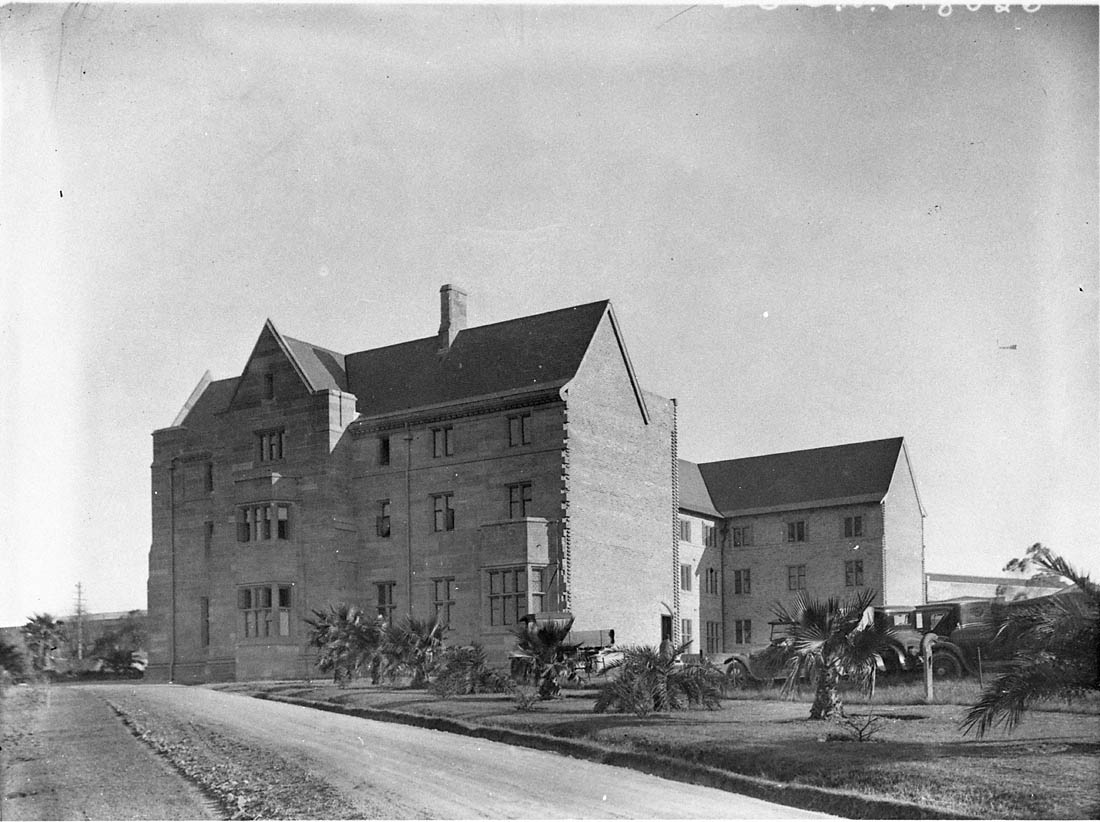
Sancta Sophia shortly after its opening in the late 1920s.

In 1923, Margaret MacRory opened a house for Catholic women students at the university and the Catholic Archbishop of Sydney, Michael Kelly, and the Bishops of New South Wales issued a letter in support of university education for the Catholic community. The building was organised by Margaret MacRory and she was in charge of the new hall. Sancta Sophia College was founded in 1925 as a hall of residence for Catholic women, and on 16 August 1926, Sancta Sophia Hall was officially blessed and opened by Archbishop Kelly. The first cohort of 23 women moved into the college on 15 March 1926. The 1926 building was designed by the Sydney architectural firm of Wardell and Dennis. Herbert Wardell was the son of William Wardell the architect of St John’s College and St Mary's Cathedral, Sydney. Dennis was a Wesleyan architect who had trained in Melbourne before establishing himself in Sydney.

In 1929, an act of parliament raised the hall to the status of a college within the University of Sydney.

In 1964 Ann Margaret Magoffin joined the college council. She was a notable accountant who had restructured the finances of the Society of the Sacred Heart in Australia.

=== Expansion ===
The college expanded over time including the East Wing and kitchen in 1961, the Octagon building in 1963, the McDonald Wing in 1970, the Vice Principal's flat in 1990, and the Principal's flat in 1993.

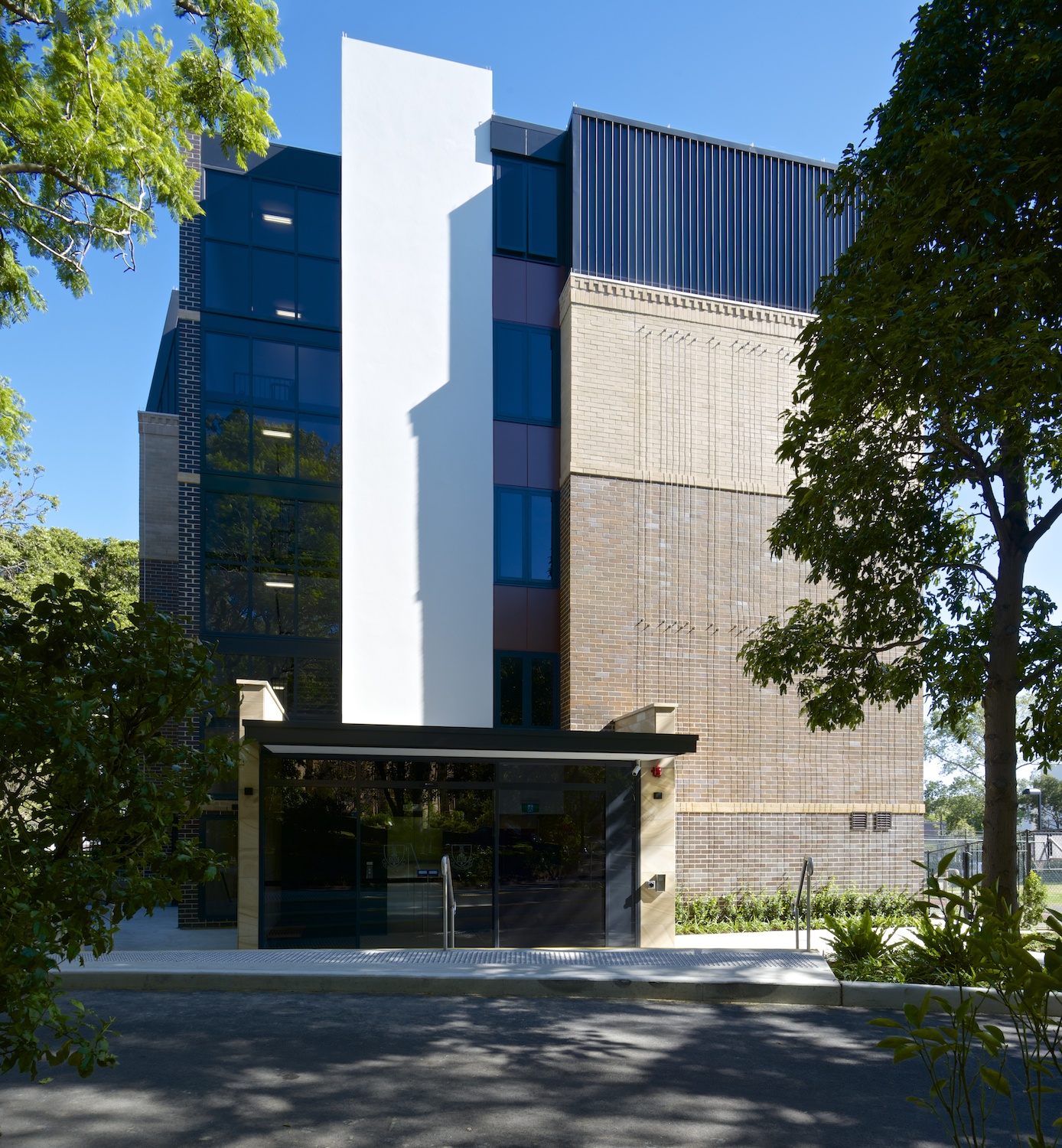
Graduate House, Sancta Sophia College

The college officially opened the Sancta Sophia Graduate House (often referred to as Grad House) in March 2014 by Governor, Her Excellency Marie Bashir and blessed by Cardinal George Pell. This was the largest single expansion in the college's history. The Graduate House consists of 128 ensuite rooms equipped with a microwave oven and mini fridge, whilst the common areas have full kitchens. The rooftop terrace is equipped with a BBQ lounge area. Every resident has meals fully catered for and served in a common dining hall with undergraduates.

== Student life ==
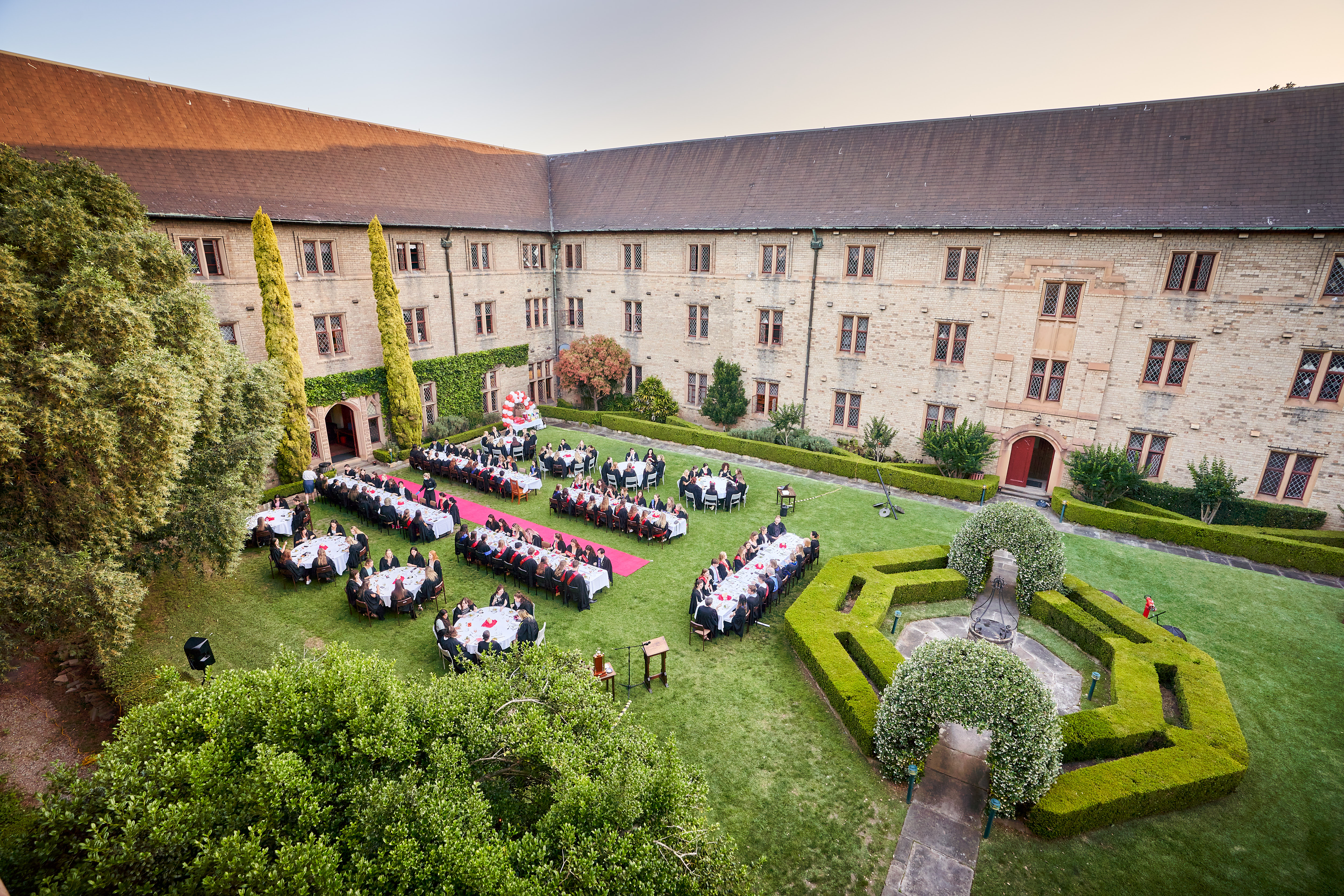
The College's Quadrangle, Valedictory Dinner, 2020

=== Academic ===
As a university college, academia is the main focus of Sancta Sophia College. A program of supplementary tutorials exists for undergraduate students and some postgraduate students. These are organised within the college and undergraduate students may attend tutorials at the other colleges. In recent years, the tutorial program has extended to support postgraduate students, particularly in medicine.

=== Cultural ===
Sancta competes against other University of Sydney residential colleges in the InterCol Performing Arts Challenge (also known as the Palladian Cup). The Palladian Cup runs year-round and features solo vocal, ensemble vocal, solo instrumental, ensemble instrumental, oration, debating, solo drama, ensemble drama, dance, and art. Since 2017, Sancta has competed in Intramural Arts at the University of Sydney and provides opportunities in dance, improv, debating, and others.

=== Sporting ===
Sancta competes in the Sydney University Intercollegiate sporting events, which is the Rosebowl Cup for women and Rawson Cup for men. The Rosebowl Cup events take place throughout the year and include netball, swimming, rowing, hockey, soccer, basketball, tennis, and athletics. Due to the relatively small cohort of men, Sancta only competes in three Rawson Cup events: swimming, rowing, and athletics.

== College governance ==
=== Council and principal ===
The council of the college consists of the chairman, the principal and 14 other councillors, of whom 3 must be priests. The council is responsible for governance of the college.

The principal is responsible for the management of the college.

=== Past principals ===
- (1930–1931) Mother Margaret MacRory
- (1931–1943) Mother Helen Boydell
- (1943–1957) Mother Juanita Macrae
- (1952) Mother Hoare (Acting Principal)
- (1958–1972) Mother Yvonne Swift
- (1972–1975) Sr Mary Brennan
- (1975–1978) Sr Mary d'Apice
- (1979–1983) Sr Patricia Toohey
- (1983–1992) Sr Mary Shanahan
- (1992–2000) Janice Raggio
- (2000–2005) Barbara Walsh
- (2005–2007) Dr Elizabeth Hepburn
- (2008–2017) Dr Marie Leech
- (2018–present) Fiona Hastings

=== Student committees ===
All undergraduate students of the college are members of the Sancta Sophia Students' Association. The Students' Association is run by a student-elected House Committee. The House Committee is responsible for planning activities on behalf of the undergraduate students. It is also responsible for liaising with the other colleges and carrying out general activities and business of the Students' Association. The members of the House Committee convene each week to discuss student matters of the college.

All postgraduate students of the college are members of the Senior Common Room, which is run by the elected executive. The Senior Common Room is responsible for the organisation of events and activities specific to postgraduate students. The members of the Senior Common Room convene every month to discuss postgraduate matters of the college and often involve negotiations with the House Committee.

== Notable alumni and community members ==
=== Politics and law ===
- Jacqueline Gleeson – Justice of the High Court of Australia
- Natalie Adams – Judge of the Supreme Court of New South Wales
- Clover Moore – Lord Mayor of Sydney and Member of NSW Legislative Assembly
- Ella Stack CBE – First Lord Mayor of Darwin
- Trixie Gardner, Baroness Gardner of Parkes AM, FRSA, JP – Dentist and Conservative member of the British House of Lords
- Anne Conlon – Australian feminist, public servant and labour activist.

=== Academia and medicine ===
- Wirginia Maixner – Neurosurgeon and director of neurosurgery, Royal Children's Hospital, Melbourne
- Sheila Cassidy – Doctor, former medical director of St Luke's Hospice in Plymouth, torture survivor
- Gwen Fleming FRACP – Doctor and major in the Royal Australian Army Medical Corps

=== Business ===
- Louise Walsh – CEO of Future Generation Investment Company, former CEO of Philanthropy Australia
- Helena Carr – Businesswoman and wife of former premier of New South Wales, and former senator and former Foreign Minister, Bob Carr
- Sir Michael Hintze – founder & CEO of Hedge Fund CQS, Economics Tutor at College

=== Arts and humanities ===
- Miranda Devine – Journalist and political commentator
- Lee Lewis – Australian Theatre director
- Patricia Horsley - Architect and philanthropist

== Publications ==
=== Journals ===
==== The Anser ====
- The Anser, Volume 1, 2018
- The Anser Volume 2, 2020
