= Hilary Carey =

Australian religious historian

- Born: Hilary Mary Beange; 1957 (age 68–69); Perth, Western Australia
- Awards: Fellow of the Australian Academy of the Humanities (2012); Kay Daniels Award (2020)

Academic background
- Education: University of Sydney (BA [Hons]); University of Oxford (DPhil)

Academic work
- Discipline: Religious history
- Institutions: University of Bristol; University of Newcastle; University of Sydney; Macquarie University
- Notable works: God's Empire: Religion and Colonialism in the British World, c.1801–1908 (2011)

Hilary Mary Carey, FAHA (née Beange; born 1957) is an Australian historian whose research focused for many years on the religious history of British settler colonies. She has been professor of imperial and religious history at the University of Bristol since 2014, where her current research interests include missions to settlers and Indigenous people, religion and convict transportation, the colonial Bible, and missions to seamen.

== Early life and education ==
Carey was born Hilary Mary Beange in Perth, Western Australia in 1957. Her father, Commander Guy Alexander Beange DSC, was a naval aviator, and her mother, Dr Helen Patricia Beange (née Flynn), a medical practitioner working with people living with intellectual disability. Carey graduated from the University of Sydney with a Bachelor of Arts degree and double Honours in Early English Literature and Language and History in 1980. She was awarded a Commonwealth scholarship to Balliol College, University of Oxford where she studied from 1980 to 1984. In 1984, her Doctor of Philosophy was awarded for research on divination and astrology at the late medieval court and university, the subject of her second book.

== Career ==
On returning to Australia, Carey worked as a professional historian completing histories of the Catholic Women's League and the Mater Misericodiae Hospital, North Sydney. She taught at Macquarie University and the University of Sydney before moving to the University of Newcastle in 1991. Along with Erin White, Carey was one of the founding editors of Women-Church: An Australian Journal of Feminist Studies in Religion. She is a founding member of the Professional Historians Association NSW (1985) and was president of the Religious History Association (2011–2013). In 2005–2006 she was Keith Cameron Professor of Australian History at University College Dublin. Concurrent with her appointment to the University of Bristol, Carey has been conjoint professor at the University of Newcastle since 2014.

== Awards and recognition ==
In 2012 Carey was elected a Corresponding Fellow of the Australian Academy of the Humanities. Also in 2012, God's Empire was shortlisted for the Ernest Scott Prize. Carey won the Kay Daniels Award in 2020 with Empire of Hell.

== Selected works ==
- Truly Feminine, Truly Catholic: A history of the Catholic Women's League in the Archdiocese of Sydney 1913–87, University of New South Wales Press, 1987 ISBN 0868402583
- In the Best of Hands: A history of the Mater Misericordiae Public Hospital & the Mater Misericordiae Private Hospital, North Sydney, 1906–1991, Hale & Iremonger, 1991 ISBN 0868064610
- Courting Disaster: Astrology at the English Court and University in the Later Middle Ages, Macmillan, 1992 ISBN 0333532937
- Believing in Australia: A cultural history of religions, Allen & Unwin, 1996 ISBN 9781863739504
- God's Empire: Religion and colonialism in the British World, c.1801–1908, Cambridge University Press, 2011 ISBN 9780521194105
- Empire of Hell: Religion and the campaign to end convict transportation in the British Empire 1788–1875, Cambridge University Press, 2019 ISBN 9781107043084
- The Colonial BIble in Australia: Scripture Translations by Biraban and Lancelot Threlkeld, 1825-1859, Language Science Press, 2024 ISBN 9783961104864
