= Noel Preston =

Australian theologian

Noel Preston (1941–2020) was an Australian ethicist, theologian and social commentator.

== Education ==
Preston completed his primary education at West End State School and his secondary education at Brisbane Boys College. He subsequently completed a Certificate of Teaching with Kelvin Grove College of Advanced Education in 1961; a Bachelor of Arts degree with the University of Queensland in 1964; a Bachelor of Divinity degree with the University of Queensland in 1967; a Doctor of Theology degree with the Boston University School of Theology (USA) in 1972; and a Master of Education (Honours) degree with the University of New England in 1988. His undergraduate studies at the University of Queensland included a major in political science and at Boston University he studied under the noted theologian Reinhold Neibuhr, eventually submitting a doctoral thesis entitled "A Christian ethical analysis of Australia's policies of Immigration Restriction and Development Partnership."

== Career ==
In various roles, Preston's focus continued to be on education, ethics, politics and spirituality. After a year of teaching at Charleville, Preston was accepted as a candidate for the ministry with the Methodist Church of Australia, and was subsequently ordained as a Methodist minister in October 1967, remaining a minister of the Uniting Church in Australia throughout his life. He has served in various social justice portfolios including inaugural Convenor of the Uniting Church's Commission on Social Responsibility (Uniting Church in Australia, Inaugural Assembly Minutes 1977); Queensland Director of the ecumenical movement Action for World Development (1976-79); Executive Officer of the Victorian Uniting Church Synod Division of Social Justice (1980-81).

From 1987 to 2001 Preston held senior academic positions at Queensland University of Technology in applied and professional ethics. He was president of the Australian Association of Professional and Applied Ethics (1996–97). and from 2002 to 2017 he was an adjunct professor at Griffith University in the Key Centre for Ethics, Law, Justice and Governance.

During his academic career he was a regular public commentator on public sector ethics, particularly in Queensland during the decade following the Fitzgerald Commission into corruption in the Queensland Government.

Among twelve books he has sole or co-authored and edited, his textbook Understanding Ethics (Federation Press) was reissued in a revised fourth edition in 2014. In 2006, he published a memoir/social history: Beyond the Boundary: a memoir exploring ethics, politics and spirituality (Zeus Publications).

In retirement Preston was particularly active in researching eco-theology, eco-spirituality and global ethics. His most recent book, (2014) Ethics with or without God (Morning Star Publishing) explores these themes. Its cover explains:

"Preston owns `the Jesus story` as central to his life. Nonetheless, while valuing the Judaeo-Christian heritage, he rejects traditional theism and challenges claims about the uniqueness of Christian Ethics. More broadly, this book is for all those who quest for the common good, and who accept the need to recover and discover a spirituality that supports us in meeting contemporary, personal and social ethical challenges, regardless of religious allegiance.”

Across his career he has initiated many social action groups.

- Concerned Christians (1975-79) as a Queensland advocacy and protest group.
- People for Nuclear Disarmament Queensland (1983-87)
- Citizens Against Corruption (1988-89)
- A founding director of the foundation for Aboriginal Research and Action (1975-79).
- Earth Charter Australia (commencing 2001)
- Executive member of the Progressive Christianity Network Queensland.

Noel Preston has also served on several government committees:

- Social Security Appeals Tribunal (1974-76)
- Queensland Community Corrections Board (1990-93)
- Queensland Responsible Gambling Advisory Committee (2004-11).

== Recognition ==
In 2004 he was appointed Member of the Order of Australia "for service to the community by raising public awareness of issues involving public sector ethics and governance, as an advocate for accountability and reforms, and as an academic and researcher in the field". The investiture at Government House, Queensland was on 16 September 2004. In 2013 the Queensland State Library announced that it was archiving papers belonging to Preston, giving a history of the social causes in which he was active.

== Personal life ==
Noel Preston was born in Mareeba, Australia on 15 December 1941, and died in 2020.He was father to Lisa, Kim and Christopher, and grandfather of three granddaughters and three grandsons. At the time of his death, Preston was married to Olga Harris, his third wife.

== Major publications ==
- Preston N (2014) Ethics with or without God Morning Star Publishing
- Preston N (2014) Understanding Ethics (4th edition) Sydney: Federation Press
- Preston N (2006) Beyond the Boundary: a memoir exploring ethics, politics and spirituality, Zeus Publications
- Preston N, Sampford C with Carmel Connors (2002) Encouraging Ethics and Challenging Corruption: reforming Governance in Public Institutions, Sydney: Federation Press
- Preston N (2001) Exploring Eco-justice: reframing ethics and spirituality in the context of globalisation, St Francis’ Theological College, Brisbane, Occasional Paper No. 13
- Co-editor with Bishop P (2000) Local Government, Public Enterprise and Ethics, Federation Press
- Preston N (1999) Engaging Empowerment, Papers to the AHWCA National Conference, QUT
- Co-editor with Sampford C and Bois C-A (1998) Ethics and Political Practice: Perspectives on Legislative Ethics, Federation Press and Routledge
- Co-editor (1998) Public Sector Ethics: Finding and Implementing Values, Federation Press and Routledge
- Preston N (ed) (1994) Ethics for the Public Sector: Education and Training, Sydney: Federation Press
- Miller S and Preston N (1996) (eds) Ethics in Practice: Proceedings of the Second National Conference of the Australian Association for Professional and Applied Ethics, Charles Sturt University: Keon Press
- Preston N and Symes C (2000) (2nd ed) Schools and Classrooms: a cultural analysis of education, Longmans
