= Penny Magee =

Australian scholar of religion specialising in feminist studies and Eastern Religions

- Born: 11 June 1937
- Died: 17 February 1998 (aged 60)
- Occupation: academic

Academic work
- Discipline: Religion
- Sub-discipline: Feminist studies
- Institutions: University of South Australia

Penny Magee (11 June 1937 – 17 February 1998) was an Australian scholar of religion. She specialised in feminist studies and eastern religions. The Penny Magee Memorial Lecture was established in her honour by the Australian Association for the Study of Religion.

== Early life and education ==
Penelope Margaret Magee was born on 11 June 1937. She grew up in Brisbane in a Catholic family.

Magee received degrees from the University of Melbourne, Adelaide and Lancaster. She studied at the University of South Australia and undertook postgraduate studies under supervisors Ninian Smart and Eric Sharp.

== Career ==
Magee was a religious studies scholar who specialised in feminist studies and Eastern religions, particularly Indology. She taught Asian Studies and Religion Studies at the University of South Australia until May 1994. She was an active member of the Australian Association for the Study of Religion (AASR) for many years, serving as Secretary/Treasurer as well as being a founding member of the AASR's journal, Australian Religious Studies Review.

Magee also worked as a casual scholar, mainly with the South Asian Women's Studies unit, which was affiliated with the National Centre for South Indian Studies and was based at Monash University in Melbourne.

Magee was an advocate for the recognition of religious studies and feminist religious studies in the academy, founding the Women's Caucus of the AASR and campaigning for greater inclusion of women's voices in the association. She was also one of the founding members of the group Ordination of Catholic Women. After her death, the Women's Caucus of the AASR established the Penny Magee Memorial Lecture in her honour. The Women's Caucus is responsible for the selection of the speaker each year, and the lecture is held at the AASR's annual conference.

== Personal life ==
Magee was a teacher and concert pianist. She later spent time learning to play the sarod, an Indian musical instrument. Magee died of cancer on 17 February 1998, leaving four children and three grandchildren. An obituary by Marie Louise Uhr was published in the journal Women-Church. Anglican priest Sarah Macneil celebrated Magee's funeral service at Moruya, and a public memorial was later held in Adelaide.

== Selected publications ==
=== Books ===
- Joy, M.; Magee, P. (1994). Claiming our rites: studies in religion by Australian women scholars. Special studies in religions series, no. 8. Australian Association for the Study of Religions. ISBN 9780908083183. OCLC 32292156.

=== Book chapters ===
- Magee, P. M. (1995). "Disputing the sacred: some theoretical approaches to gender and religion". In Ursula King (ed.). Religion and gender. Blackwell. pp. 101–120. ISBN 9780631193760. OCLC 30073565.
- Magee, P.; Masefield, P.; Wiebe, D. (1994). "Roderick Ninian Smart: a biographical sketch". Aspects of religion: essays in honour of Ninian Smart. Toronto studies in religion, vol. 18. Peter Lang. ISBN 9780820422374.
