= Greer Anne Wenh-In Ng =

Hong Kong-born Canadian religious educator (born 1936)

- Born: 1936 (age 89–90); Hong Kong
- Education: University of Hong Kong (BA, MA) Columbia University (PhD) Emmanuel College, Toronto (MDiv)
- Occupation: Religious educator
- Employer: Emmanuel College, Toronto

Greer Anne Wehn-In Ng (吳 詠 嫣; born 1936) is a Hong Kong-born Canadian scholar and religious educator. Having taught Christian education at Vancouver School of Theology and Emmanuel College in Toronto, Ng has also served in leadership roles for the United Church of Canada. She is known as a feminist and anti-racist leader within the church. Ng is listed as one of 215 most-influential Christian educators by a peer reviewed database maintained by the Talbot School of Theology.

== Early life and education ==
Ng was born in Hong Kong in 1936 and was given both Chinese and English names, Ng Wenh-In (吳 詠 嫣) Greer Anne. She is one of eight children raised by her parents, Ng Yan Yee, a businessman, and her mother, Wong Shuc Kee. Her parents were not religious, but they were educated in Confucian and Taoist thinking. The family observed basic Confucian rituals and Chinese holidays. Ng remembers her parents as people that encouraged her education and fostered curiosity.

Following the Japanese occupation of Hong Kong, Ng's family moved to Vietnam and then to Macau. She returned to Hong Kong for high school. During high school, She attended a Baptist mission school and a Catholic church.

Ng graduated from the University of Hong Kong in 1958 and 1960 with a Bachelor and then a Master of Arts degree in English (with a focus on the writer, George Eliot). While at the university, she studied with the poet Edmund Blunden. She became a Protestant in college and reports that she preferred the Congregationalist emphasis on direct access to God.

In 1960 she moved to New York City to begin a PhD at Columbia University. However, she left Columbia University in 1964 in order to move to Singapore with her husband, Kam-Yan Ng. In Singapore she began teaching at Trinity Theological College. She was one of the first women at the college to teach with faculty status. In 1966, the couple moved to Toronto for a year-long sabbatical. During that year, her husband was a visiting scholar at Emmanuel College, Victoria University. When the sabbatical ended, the couple moved to New York and Ng completed her PhD at Columbia in 1969. Her dissertation was entitled, “The Figure of the Child in Victorian Novels of Protest”.

In 1978 Ng returned to school to complete a Master of Divinity degree at Emmanuel College. She completed the degree in 1980 and was ordained in the United Church of Canada in 1986.

== Career ==
Ng’s career in Christian education began in the late 1960's as a Sunday school teacher at Riverside Church in New York City. At the church her role as an educator was supervised by Josephine Bliss who served as the director of Riverside's children's ministry.

After returning to Toronto, Ng served in roles for the United Church of Canada. From 1975 to 1980 she was a writer-in-residence for the denomination’s Division of Communication and Division of Mission. She worked on curriculum development and mission education in this role. She then worked for a year as a Ministerial Associate for the St. James-Bond United Church in Toronto after which she worked from 1981-1986 as the Christian development officer for the United Church's Hamilton Conference.

Her career as professor of educational ministry began in 1986 at the Vancouver School of Theology. She worked at the school until 1995 when she began working as a professor of Christian education and as coordinator of the Centre for Asian Theology at Emmanuel College. During this time, she also served as a board member of the Pacific Asian American Canadian Christian Education Ministries (PAACCE).

Ng served as president of the Religious Education Association: An Association of Professors, Practitioners, and Researchers in Religious Education (REA:AP-PRRE) from 2001 to 2002. She was one of the first Asian women to participate in the organization.

Ng retired from Emmanuel College on June 30, 2002. However, she remained active in ministerial leadership for the United Church of Canada. In 2004 she edited a handbook on anit-racist spirituality published by the church. She has continued to author works in retirement including chapters on diversity in the United Church of Canada and on anti-Asian hate. She has also remained connected to Emmanuel College as co-chair of the Committee on Asian/North American Asian Theologies.

She has published over fifty works including book chapters, journal articles, edited books, curricula, and liturgical resources.

== Awards and honors ==
She is the first Asian North American woman featured in the "Christian Educators of the 20th Century," a web-based database of 215 Christian educators maintained by the Talbot School of Theology.

In 2010 Victoria University granted Ng an honorary Doctorate in Divinity. Her records of teaching, writing, and professional activities (1987-2002) are held in the archives of the Victoria University Library.

In 2023 she received the Companion of the Centre Award from the Centre for Christian Studies.

== Feminism and religion ==
Ng recalls that as a child she was aware of the gender-based privilege given to her younger brother. Likewise, her feminist consciousness grew as she witnessed the lives of women in different cultures. Her feminist theology grew as a result of conversations with colleagues. She was also influenced by Rachel Conrad Wahlberg’s Jesus According to a Woman and Virginia Ramey Mollenkott’s Women, Men and the Bible.

She was aware that her experiences as a married Asian woman in her field were often unique. After joining the Pacific, Asian, and North American Women in Theology and Ministry (PANAAWTM), she met Rita Nakashima, Kwok Pui-Lan, and other prominent Asian women in religion. Her experiences with the organization encouraged her to begin using her Chinese name, Wenh-In. She helped to secure funding for the PANAAWTM organization and contributed to a research report about theological curricula for Asian women in North America.

Influenced by Paulo Freire, and introducing his work to lay audiences, Ng pursued a contextualized, pragmatic, anti-racist, and justice-centered approach to religious education.

Ng practices embodied spirituality with daily Tai Chi, calligraphy, and hymn writing.

== Selected works ==
- Ng, G.A.W. (2020). Complexities in religious education with Asian/Asian Canadians and Indigenous realities: the Truth and Reconciliation Commission Report on Residential Schools. Religious Education, 115(3), 315–322. doi:10.1080/00344087.2020.1772622
- Ng, G.A.W. (2020). Let (racial) justice roll down like waters. Touchstone 38, no. 2: 23–31.
- Ng, G.A.W. (2018). My religious education Sangha and Dharma: learning-teaching as an Asian in the North American diaspora. Religious Education, 113(2), 165–172. doi:10.1080/00344087.2018.1432997
- Ng, G.A.W. (2005). Reading through new eyes: post-colonial theology. Catholic New Times 29, no. 1.
- Ng, Wenh-In, ed. That All May Be One: A Resource for Educating toward Racial Justice. United Church Publishing House, 2004.
- Ng, G.A.W. (2004). Beyond bible stories: the role of culture-specific myths/stories in the identity formation of nondominant immigrant children. Religious Education, 99(2), 125–136. doi:10.1080/00344080490433701
- Ng, G.A.W. Land of maple and lands of bamboo. In Realizing the America of our Hearts: Theological Voices of Asian Americans, edited by E. S. Fernandez, 99–114. St. Louis, MO: Chalice Press, 2003.
- Ng, G.A.W. (2000). From Confucian master teacher to Freirian mutual learner: challenges in pedagogical practice and religious education. Religious Education, 95(3), 308–319. doi:10.1080/0034408000950307
- Ng, G.A.W. (1997). Contextualization of religious education in an age of disbelief. Religious Education, 92(2), 192–203. doi:10.1080/0034408970920205

== Sources ==
- "Announcing the 2023 Companion of the Centre". Centre for Christian Studies. 2023-01-26.
- Greer Anne Wenh-In Ng fonds (F2157). Victoria University Archives.
- Johnson, S. "Greer Anne Wenh-In Ng: Green is Better than Blue". In Colleen D. Hartung, Challenging Bias against Women Academics in Religion. Chicago: ATLA Open Press, 2021.
- Tran, Mai Anh. "Wenh-In Ng". Christian Educators of the 20th Century. Biola University.
