= Religious Education Association =

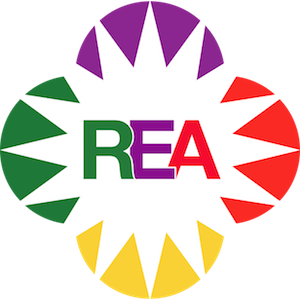
- Abbreviation: REA
- Formation: 1903
- Founder: William Rainey Harper
- President: Karen-Marie Yust
- Affiliations: American Academy of Religion
- Website: http://religiouseducation.net

The Religious Education Association is the world's oldest and largest association of scholars and researchers in the field of religious education. It is a nonprofit member association, serving as a professional and learned society for scholars and researchers involved in the field of religious education. It has several hundred members, most of whom are from North America, with a scattering of members worldwide. REA members are university and college professors, independent scholars, secondary teachers, clergy, church educators, curriculum developers, judicatory executives, seminarians, graduate students, and interested lay-people. REA members come from multiple faith traditions, and no tradition, and study a very diverse array of religious traditions. The REA's leaders (presidents and executive secretaries) are drawn from a distinguished list of educators.

== History ==
The REA was founded in 1903 by William Rainey Harper, the first president of the University of Chicago, with the support of the Council of Seventy, a learned society of biblical scholars. George Albert Coe was also involved in its establishment. The keynote speaker at its first convention was John Dewey. In its early years the Association was organized into several groups: Council of religious education, Universities and colleges, Theological seminaries, Churches and pastors, Sunday schools, Secondary public schools, Elementary public schools, Private schools, Teacher-training, Christian associations, Young people's societies, the Home, Libraries, the Press, Correspondence instructions, Summer assemblies, Religious art, and Music. In 1906 the Association began to publish the journal Religious Education under the editorship of Henry Cope. In 1953 the Association marked its 50th anniversary with a three-day meeting at the University of Pittsburgh that brought together more than 2500 Christian and Jewish educators from the US and Canada. In 1973 the Association began awarding the William Harper Rainey award to distinguished educators. In 1975, the Association held a major national colloquy on civil religion at which scholars Robert Bellah, Vine DeLoria, Jr., and Michael Novak spoke. In 1992 the Association began awarding the Herman E. Wornom award to distinguished institutions. In 2003 the REA merged with the Association of Professors and Researchers in Religious Education (which was formed in 1970 from an earlier section of the National Council of Churches). Yale University holds the archives of the Religious Education Association and its predecessor bodies.

== Publications ==
The REA has published the scholarly journal Religious Education continuously since 1906 (archives of which are available electronically at Taylor & Francis). This journal has consistently published work by scholars from multiple continents, diverse faith traditions, and various educational settings, and maintains a high level of citation in various ranking systems. In 2014 the REA began publishing a scholarly monograph series entitled Horizons in Religious Education jointly with Wipf & Stock. The REA also publishes a quarterly newsletter, eREACH, which began as the "religious education association clearing house," and which serves to network, resource, and connect the association members.

== Annual meeting ==
The REA hosts an annual meeting, usually in early July. Meeting presentations occur in three formats: research interest group (a formal scholarly paper), collaborative session (engaging ideas from a number of scholars on the same theme), and poster (a typical scholarly poster presentation). The association has a long history of commitment to collegiality, innovative learning design, and support for students. In addition, the REA is a "related scholarly organization" to the American Academy of Religion, and hosts one session each year at the AAR annual meeting.
