= Elaine Wainwright =

Australian theologian (1948–2024)

- Born: 1948
- Died: 2024 (aged 75–76)
- Title: Professor in Theology (retired)

Academic background
- Education: École Biblique, Jerusalem

Academic work
- Discipline: Feminist approaches to Biblical Studies
- Institutions: University of Auckland

Elaine Mary Wainwright (1948–2024) was an Australian theologian and biblical scholar. Wainwright was Richard Maclaurin Goodfellow Professor in Theology at the University of Auckland until her retirement at the end of 2014. She is known for her feminist scholarship in Matthew's gospel, and work on gender and healing within the Graeco-Roman world. Some of her most recent publications are The Bible in/and Popular Culture: A Creative Encounter (SBL, 2010), Women Healing/Healing Women: the Genderisation of Healing in Early Christianity (Equinox, 2006), and Shall We Look for Another: A Feminist Re-reading of the Matthean Jesus (Orbis, 1998). Wainwright initially studied at the University of Queensland and then obtained a master's degree at Catholic Theological Union in Chicago and a PhD at the École Biblique in Jerusalem.

As Professor Emerita of Auckland University, Elaine Wainwright RSM, was a member of the Institute of the Sisters of Mercy in Australia and Papua New Guinea and was the international coordinator of the Mercy International Reflection Process (MIRP) in 2016.

In 2024 Wainwright was honoured with a festschrift titled Habitats of the Basileia. Wainwright died at Nudgee on 5 July 2024.

== Selected works ==
=== Books ===
- Wainwright, Elaine M. Habitat, Human, and Holy: An Eco-Rhetorical Reading of the Gospel of Matthew. Sheffield: Sheffield Phoenix Press Limited, 2017.
- Wainwright, Elaine M., Robert J. Myles and Carlos Olivares, Matthew: An Introduction and Study Guide: The Basileia of the Heavens Is Near at Hand. T & T Clark Study Guides to the New Testament. London: T&T Clark, 2017.
- Wainwright, Elaine M., Women Healing/Healing Women: The Genderisation of Healing in Early Christianity. London: Taylor & Francis Group, 2014.
- Wainwright, Elaine M., Luiz Carlos Susin and Felix Wilfred (eds). Eco-theology. London: SCM, 2009.
- Wainwright, Elaine M., Shall We Look for Another? A Feminist Rereading of the Matthean Jesus. The Bible & Liberation. Maryknoll, N.Y.: Orbis Books, 1998.
- Wainwright, Elaine M., Towards a Feminist Critical Reading of the Gospel According to Matthew. Berlin/Boston: De Gruyter, Inc., 1991.

=== Articles ===
- Wainwright, Elaine M. (January 2015). "In Memory of Her! Exploring the Political Power of Readings—Feminist and Ecological". Feminist Theology. 23 (2): 205–220. doi:10.1177/0966735014555640. S2CID 145161630.
- Wainwright, Elaine M. (20 February 2014). "Crossing over; taking refuge: A contrapuntal reading". HTS Teologiese Studies / Theological Studies. 70 (1): 6 pages. doi:10.4102/hts.v70i1.2720. hdl:2263/45104.
- Wainwright, Elaine Mary (2014). "'Ecological hermeneutics: reflections on methods and prospects for the future"' by David G. Horrell: a response". Colloquium. 46 (2): 166–169.
- Wainwright, Elaine M. (2012). "Images, Words and Stories: Exploring their Transformative Power in Reading Biblical Texts Ecologically". Biblical Interpretation. 20 (3): 280–304. doi:10.1163/156851512X651096.
- Wainwright, Elaine Mary (2012). "Reading Matt 21:12-22 Ecologically". Australian Biblical Review. 60: 67–79.
- Wainwright, Elaine M. (6 June 2011). "On pilgrimage with biblical women in their land(s)". HTS Teologiese Studies / Theological Studies. 67 (1): 7 pages. doi:10.4102/hts.v67i1.918. hdl:2263/17066.
- Wainwright, Elaine M. (5 November 2009). "Reading the Gospel of Matthew within the global context: A response". HTS Teologiese Studies / Theological Studies. 65 (1): 2 pages. doi:10.4102/hts.v65i1.322. hdl:2263/13025.
- Wainwright, Elaine M. (2002). "Review of Matthew and the Margins: A Sociopolitical and Religious Reading (Bible and Liberation)". The Catholic Biblical Quarterly. 64 (3): 564–566. JSTOR 43727480.
- Wainwright, Elaine M. (July 2000). "Reading Matthew 3-4: Jesus—Sage, Seer, Sophia, Son of God". Journal for the Study of the New Testament. 22 (77): 25–43. doi:10.1177/0142064X0002207702. S2CID 162244474.
