= Kathleen McPhillips =

Australian academic and sociologist of religion and gender

- Occupations: Sociologist, academic

Academic background
- Education: University of Newcastle PhD; Macquarie University (BA; (Hons)
- Thesis: Feminism, religion and modernity

Academic work
- Discipline: Sociology
- Sub-discipline: Sociology of religion
- Institutions: University of Newcastle
- Main interests: sociology of religion and gender
- Website: www.newcastle.edu.au/profile/kathleen-mcphillips

Kathleen McPhillips is an Australian sociologist of religion and gender in the School of Humanities, Creative Industries and Social Sciences at the University of Newcastle, Australia and the current vice-president of the Australian Association for the Study of Religion.

== Education ==
McPhillips completed a Bachelor of Arts (Hons) at Macquarie University and a Doctor of Philosophy at the University of Newcastle. Her doctoral thesis, titled Feminism, religion and modernity, was completed in 1995.

== Career ==
McPhillips is an Australian sociologist of religion, gender and trauma. Her academic appointments have included roles at the Australian National University, the University of Western Sydney and the University of Newcastle. She is currently in the School of Humanities, Creative Industries and Social Sciences at the University of Newcastle, Australia. McPhillips is also a researcher at the Centre for the History of Violence and leads the Interdisciplinary Trauma Research Group at the University of Newcastle.

McPhillips contributed multiple articles to Women-Church: an Australian journal of feminist studies in religion over its 20-year history as well as writing annotated bibliographies of texts related to religion and feminism.

McPhillips has written and published extensively in the field of gender-based violence and institutional child sexual abuse. Her work considers the social and gender impacts of institutional violence in religious organisations, particularly in the Catholic Church. McPhillips attended the NSW Special Commission of Inquiry into matters relating to the police investigation of certain child sexual abuse allegations in the Catholic Diocese of Maitland-Newcastle in 2013. Between 2014 and 2017 she attended many public hearings of the Royal Commission into Institutional Responses to Child Sexual Abuse and in 2017 the trial of Archbishop Philip Wilson, who had been charged with failing to report incidents of child sexual abuse. The Australian Royal Commission was a landmark enquiry into the causes and impacts of child sexual abuse with the commission's final report being made public in December 2017. McPhillips and colleague Jodi Death from Queensland University of Technology, are currently working on a mapping project in the Maitland-Newcastle diocese that will explore the relationships between perpetrators of child sexual abuse and managers in Catholic institutions.

McPhillips is the current vice-president of the Australian Association for the Study of Religion (AASR). In 2000 the AASR Women's Caucus selected her to give the annual Penny Magee Memorial Lecture.

McPhillips is an associate editor for the Australian Religion Studies Review. She is on the International Advisory Board for the UK journal Feminist Dissent and managing editor of the Seachanges journal.

She has been on the international editorial board of the Journal of Feminist Studies in Religion since 2000.

In 2018 McPhillips received the John Barrett Award for Australian Studies from the International Australian Studies Association (InASA) Executive. In 2019 she received the Dean's Excellence Award for Teaching and Learning at the University of Newcastle.

McPhillips is regularly called upon to comment in her fields of expertise in the media. She has been a guest on ABC Radio National's Religion and Ethics program and written for The Conversation, particularly about issues to do with sexual abuse in the Catholic Church. In 2020 McPhillips contributed to the Religious Studies Project, a UK organisation that explores contemporary issues in the academic study of religion through podcasts.

In 2021 McPhillips edited a volume with Naomi Goldberg, The End of Religion: Feminist Reappraisals of the State with one reviewer noting, "This volume offers new insights into the whole enterprise, inviting foundational changes to the field if scholars are courageous enough to be sufficiently critical".

In 2022 McPhillips is co-leader of the research team designing, implementing, and analysing the International Survey of Catholic Women in preparation for a submission for the 2023 Vatican meeting on the Synodal Church.

== Select publications ==
=== Books ===
- McPhillips, K. and Goldenberg, N. R. (eds) (2021) The end of religion: feminist reappraisals of the state. Abingdon, Oxon: Routledge ISBN 9781472470430
- Isherwood, L. and McPhillips, K. (2016) Post-Christian feminisms: a critical approach. London: Routledge, Taylor & Francis Group. ISBN 9781138262973
- Hume, L. and McPhillips, K. (2006) Popular spiritualities: the politics of contemporary enchantment. Aldershot, England: Ashgate. ISBN 0754639991
- McPhillips, K. (2002) Local heroes: Australian crusades from the environmental frontline. Annandale, N.S.W.: Pluto Press. ISBN 1864030585

=== Journal articles ===
- McPhillips K, (2021) 'Mobilising for justice: the contribution of organised survivor groups in Australia to addressing sexual violence against children in Christian churches', Journal for the Academic Study of Religion, 34 3-28. doi:10.1558/jasr.19573
- McPhillips K, (2020) 'Religion after the royal commission: Challenges to religion state relations', Religions, 11 1–13. doi:10.3390/rel11010044
- McPhillips K, Salter M, Roberts-Pedersen E, Kezelman C, (2020) 'Understanding trauma as a system of psycho-social harm: Contributions from the Australian royal commission into child sex abuse', Child Abuse and Neglect, 99 1–12. doi:10.1016/j.chiabu.2019.104232
- McPhillips K, (2019) 'Silence, Secrecy and Power: Understanding the Royal Commission Findings into the Failure of Religious Organisations to Protect Children', Journal for the Academic Study of Religion, 31 116–142. doi:10.1558/jasr.37306
