= Women and the Australian Church =

Australian ecumenical religious organisation

- Abbreviation: WATAC
- Founded: 1984
- Registration no.: 83 850 328 569 (ABN)
- Location: New South Wales, Australia
- Region served: Australia
- Key people: Founder, Camille Agnes Becker Paul
- Website: watac.net.au

Women and the Australian Church (WATAC) is an Australian ecumenical religious organisation that was founded in 1984. It was originally a Catholic initiative, being a national project of Australian religious men and women. It is now an ecumenical association, open to different denominations and faiths, with a network of separate groups operating in different Australian states and territories.

== History ==
WATAC was founded in 1984 by Camille Agnes Becker Paul, along with Mercy Sister Pauline Smith and Josephite Sister Patricia Bartley. Other women involved in the early days of the organisation were long-term New South Wales state coordinator Bernice Moore and Sydney architect and philanthropist Patricia Horsley. The name Women and (rather than in) the Australian Church was chosen because the founding committee wanted to include all women, irrespective of whether they were active members of the institutional church.

WATAC was established as a national project of the Religious women and men of Australia. Its main purpose was to change the understanding of the role of women in the Australian church and society by raising awareness of Christian feminist issues. As part of its 1988 goal, WATAC sought 'an ongoing development of feminist theology, appropriately related to the Australian context'.

The first national WATAC conference was held in Sydney in August 1987. At this conference Good Samaritan Sister, Sonia Wagner gave the keynote address, speaking on the topic of Catholic feminism and reflecting on the changing role of women in the Australian church. The first issue of Women-Church was also launched. The Australian Christian feminist journal Women-Church was published from 1987 to 2007 by the collective also named Women-Church.

In 1989 WATAC was one of the three groups that called together the first ecumenical feminist theology conference ever held in Australia. Titled Towards a Feminist Theology, the conference was also organised by the Movement for the Ordination of Women (Australia) and Women-Church and was attended by 450 people. Two years later WATAC joined with these groups again, along with Feminist Uniting Network, to organise another conference which was titled Women Authoring Theology.

Although it founders were mostly Catholic women, WATAC now has a diverse ecumenical membership, and includes both men and women. A network of local and regional groups operate across multiple Australian states and territories.

== Projects ==
Recent WATAC projects include Australian Women Preach, WATAC Presents and WATAC in Dialogue. Australian Women Preach is a joint initiative with The Grail in Australia, and is a podcast that showcases preaching by Christian women from different denominations.

== WATAC research and histories ==
The results of a national survey of WATAC members was published in 1987. Angela Coco completed an honours thesis at the University of Queensland in 1993 on the history of WATAC, titled Women and the Australian Church: Project or Proclamation? This was summarised in an article in Women-Church.

In 1999, a doctoral thesis was completed at the University of New England, titled Voices of Women: Women's Experience of the Catholic Church in Australia. This thesis surveyed all members of WATAC (NSW) and asked the question, "How do women experience the church and desire change within the church?" Australian historian Anne O'Brien, also included the story of WATAC in her book God's Willing Workers: Women and Religion in Australia, which was published in 2005. Bernice Moore wrote a history of WATAC in an article published in the final issue of Australian feminist theology journal Women-Church in 2007. Dominican religious sister, Patricia Madigan wrote a history of WATAC in 2021.
