= Women-Church =

Australian feminist theology journal

- Discipline: Feminist theology
- Language: English

Publication details
- History: 1987–2007
- Publisher: Women-Church Collective (Australia)
- Frequency: Semiannual

Standard abbreviations
- ISO 4: Women-Church

Indexing
- ISSN: 1030-0139
- OCLC no.: 42817109

Links
- Women-Church Complete Archive on JSTOR Open Community Collections

Women-Church: An Australian journal of feminist studies in religion was an Australian journal published by the Women-Church Collective. It was established in 1987 and ceased publication in 2007, with a total of 40 issues published over that time. The journal covered a broad range of topics in the fields of feminist theology, religion and spirituality.

== Scope ==
Under the broader umbrella of feminism, religion and women's spirituality, the Women-Church journal included content from authors that held a diversity of understandings and perspectives.

The journal documented major changes in feminist religious culture over a 20-year period. Its editorial policy encouraged contributions from more marginalized groups and it remained a non-refereed title as a way of making it accessible to a wide range of readers. Australian sociologist of religion and gender, Kathleen McPhillips has noted that the journal was "a place where young scholars could showcase their ideas, where women could share ideas around ritual and liturgy, and where artists and poets could publish their work".

== History ==
Erin White, along with Hilary Carey, was one of the founding editors of Women-Church. Camille Paul co-edited the journal from 1989 to 2007. Paul and White wrote a history of the journal's beginnings for the 5th Birthday Issue of Women-Church in Spring 1992. Elaine Lindsay was co-editor of the journal from 1992 to 2007.

The journal was launched twice. It was first launched in Melbourne at the Movement for the Ordination of Women conference. It was also launched a week later at the first Women and the Australian Church National Conference that was held in Sydney in August 1987. Jean Gledhill gave a speech at this event which placed the launch of the journal in the context of Australian religious feminism, also noting the previous publication of the Australian Christian feminist magazine Magdalene. Gledhill's speech was published in its entirety in the second issue of Women-Church. In the journal's second-last and final issue Erin White contributed a personal account of the history of the journal and the Women-Church Group. The journal's final issue included many letters from all over Australia that told of their sadness at losing a publication that had nourished their religious lives for two decades.

== Access ==
Select articles from the journal are available online via the Informit database.

Mannix Library, in East Melbourne has also digitised the entire run of the journal and made it available on the University of Divinity's Digital Collections website and on JSTOR Open Community Collections.

The Women-Church archives are now held by the Jessie Street National Women's Library in Sydney.
