= Mannix Library =

Theological library located in East Melbourne, Australia

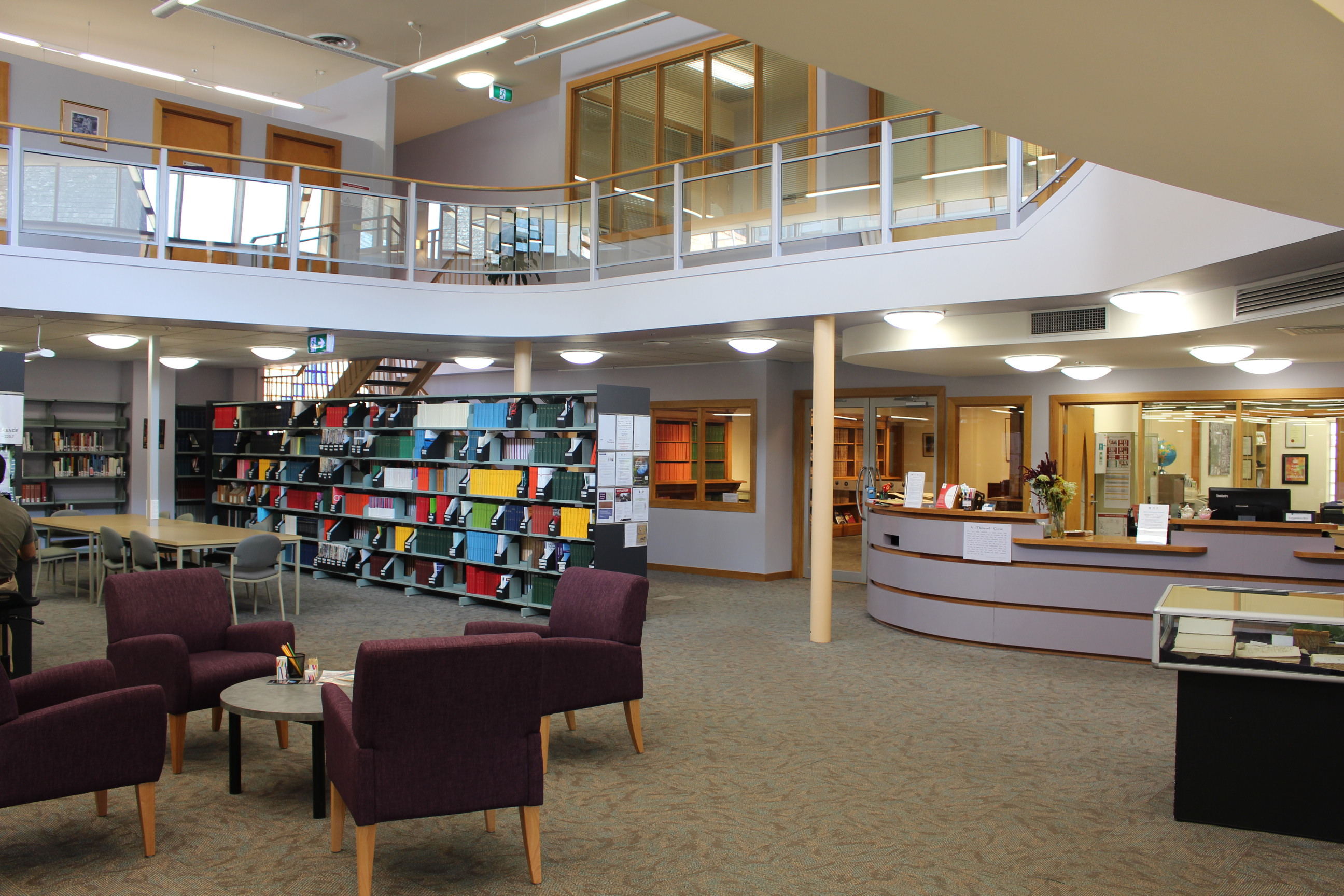
- Mannix Library Entrance
- Interactive map of the Mannix Library area

General information
- Type: Theological Library
- Location: 278 Victoria Parade, East Melbourne, Victoria, Australia
- Coordinates: 37°48′34″S 144°58′50″E
- Construction started: 1923
- Owner: Archdiocese of Melbourne

Design and construction
- Architect: Gregory Burgess

Website
- www.mannix.org.au

Mannix Library is an academic theological library located in East Melbourne, Australia. The library specialises in the areas of theology, philosophy, biblical studies and associated disciplines, and supports teaching and research at Catholic Theological College and the wider University of Divinity. The student body includes candidates for ordination, lay men and women, undergraduate, postgraduate and higher degree by research students, and members of the general public. The library uses OCLC's World Share Management System.

== History ==
Mannix Library was founded in 1923 as part of Corpus Christi College, Melbourne, the provincial seminary for the Catholic dioceses of Victoria and Tasmania. Throughout their history the seminary and library were located in Werribee, Glen Waverley and Clayton. In 1972 Catholic Theological College was established and from that time the library began providing services to both college staff and students and to seminarians. In 1999 the library relocated from Clayton to its current site in East Melbourne and from this time was funded by the Roman Catholic Archdiocese of Melbourne. When it relocated the library was renamed Mannix Library after long-serving former Archbishop of Melbourne, Daniel Mannix.

== Design ==
Mannix Library and Catholic Theological College are co-located in the same building, which was designed by Melbourne-based architect Gregory Burgess. Gregory Burgess Architects received several awards for the construction of the Catholic Theological College building. These included the Royal Australian Institute of Architects (VIC) Commendation: The Melbourne Prize in 2000, and the Australian Property Institute, Heritage Property Award in 2001.

== Special collections ==
In February 2019 Mannix Library officially opened its new Special Collections Room. The library's Special Collections include rare books such as pre-1800 works and incunabula, a Catholic Heritage Collection, a Hibernica (Irish history and literature) Collection, a Knights of Malta Collection, previously owned by Richard Divall, and an ISCAST Science and Religion Collection.

=== Archbishop Goold collection ===
James Alipius Goold was Melbourne's first Catholic Archbishop. During his lifetime he amassed a significant personal library which on his death was left to the diocesan library. The Archbishop Goold Collection includes over 1000 discrete volumes. Many items have been digitised and are available via the University of Divinity's Digital Collections website. The Goold Collection has also been incorporated in Atla's Digital Library and on the JSTOR platform.

=== Rod Doyle collections ===
Items in these collections originally belonged to Br Rod Doyle CFC, a Christian Brother, who taught New Testament studies at Catholic Theological College for many years. The Rod Doyle collections include ancient artifacts such as pottery bowls and lamps, ranging from the Early Bronze Age to the Byzantine period and a collection of over 200 ancient coins.

== Events ==
Mannix Library staff contributed to the Australian Research Council-funded Discovery Project (DP 170100426), A Baroque Archbishop in Colonial Australia: James Alipius Goold, 1812-1886. The project was chosen by the Australian Research Council as one of the best 100 research projects in Australia in a flipbook they published online. The article specifically mentions Mannix Library and the rare books room created to showcase Archbishop Goold's collection and the exhibition held at Old Treasury Building, Melbourne from 31 July 2019 – 2 March 2020, The Invention of Melbourne: A Baroque Archbishop and a Gothic Architect.

== Collaboration with other libraries ==
Mannix Library is part of the larger University of Divinity library network. All members of the University may borrow from all associated libraries, which share a joint Library Collections Policy. Mannix Library staff manage the University's online Library Hub. Four libraries associated with the University of Divinity, including Mannix Library, implemented a shared Library Management System in early 2021. Reciprocal borrowing arrangements are also in place between the University of Divinity and the University of Melbourne libraries.

Mannix Library is a member of the Australian and New Zealand Theological Library Association (ANZTLA). Mannix Library Manager, Kerrie Burn, is a member of the Atla (formerly American Theological Library Association) Board of Directors. A previous role on Atla's International Theological Librarianship Education Task Force lead to a 2020 publication and contributing a chapter on Theological libraries in Australia and New Zealand.
