= Councils of Churches in Australia =

Council of Churches could refer to any one of several collaborations of evangelical Christian denominations in Australia. Their chief purpose was to act as advocates and lobbyists to governments on "moral" questions — liquor, gambling, censorship, and observance of the Sabbath (on Sunday) being prominent concerns, followed in the 1940s by Communism. The Tasmanian Council of Churches made headlines interstate when it protested rocket and bomb tests in Central Australia as "inimical to the welfare of aborigines". When one of the Councils objected to unmarried mothers receiving child endowment, Sydney Truth, alluding to declining congregations, dubbed it the "Council of (Empty) Churches".

Councils were formed in each of the six states at different times, with different titles and separate constitutions and individual and varying constituent memberships. They achieved different levels of recognition within their state and outside, and consequently executive positions had higher status in some than in others. In some states regional councils were formed; and occasionally rival councils were created. They were:

- New South Wales Council of Churches
- Queensland Council of Churches
- South Australian Council of Churches
- Tasmanian Council of Churches
- Victorian Council of Churches
- Western Australian Council of Churches

In 1930 several State Councils were among the hundreds of organisations that affirmed 27 August (the anniversary of the Kellogg–Briand Pact) as World Peace Day: Arthur E. Bickmore, of Annerley, Queensland, represented the Council of Churches in Queensland, the Council of Churches in N.S.W. was represented by Victor C. Bell, the Council of Churches in Tasmania by Charles Matear, (Note: Charles Matear was born in Castlemaine, Victoria, in August 1878 a son of George Horace Matear, telegraphist of the Bendigo Post Office, and Annie Matear née Petrie. He was associated with St Andrew's Sunday School, Bendigo Presbyterian minister of St Andrew's churches in Hobart 1927–1934 and Colac 1934–1945.) and the Council of Churches in Victoria by Alex Hardie (Note: Alexander Hardie (1855–1935), a Presbyterian minister, was born in Stirling, Scotland, and gained his MA at Glasgow University. He was called to Kilmore, Victoria in 1890 then Heidelberg in 1900, where he retired in 1925.).

In 1941 a federal body, the Australian Council of Churches, was formed and the State councils became less relevant.

== Australian Council of Churches ==
The Australian Council of Churches was constituted on 23 September 1941 as a federation of State councils. 1941 C. Bernard Cockett president; joint secretaries: Revs. George A. Judkins (Melbourne), and F. H. Rayward (Sydney) 1948 S. Barton Babbage, pres; S. A. Eastman sec.

It was associated with the World Council of Churches from that body's inception in 1942.

In July 1994 it was supplanted by the National Council of Churches in Australia (NCCA), which included the Roman Catholic Church (which had observer status in the ACC from 1965) and some Orthodox churches, was founded to supplant the Australian Council of Churches. Bishops Bede Heather and Richard Appleby, Catholic and Anglican respectively, have been credited with its formation.

Despite non-participation by the Lutheran, Baptist, Presbyterian and major Pentecostal churches, the Council claimed to represent 85 per cent of Australian Christians.

In 2003 the Rev. David Muir Gill, general secretary of the council, was made OAM in recognition of his work with the NCCA.

See also

- Brigid Arthur
- Jean Gledhill
- Janette Gray
- James Haire
- Gregor Henderson
- Margaret Holmes
- Bernice Moore
- Michael Putney
- Jean Skuse
- Marie Tulip
- Lilian Wells
- D'Arcy Wood
