= Waldock =

Waldock is a surname. Notable people with the surname include:

- Arthur John Waldock (1872–1961), Baptist minister in Australia
- Arthur John Alfred Waldock (1898–1950), Australian professor of English Literature
- Frederic Waldock (1898–1959), first-class cricketer
- Humphrey Waldock (1904–1981), British jurist and international lawyer
- Reece Waldock, Australian public servant
- Ronnie Waldock (born 1932), English former professional association football player
- Ray Waldock (born 1975). Designer and Angler

== See also ==
- Waldo (disambiguation)
