= Andrew Watt (disambiguation) =

Andrew Watt (born 1990) is an American musician and record producer.

Andrew Watt may also refer to:

- Andrew Watt (lacrosse) (born 1984), professional lacrosse player for the Buffalo Bandits
- Andrew Alexander Watt (1853–1928), Anglo-Irish businessman
- Andrew Watt (meteorologist) (1869–1929), Scottish meteorologist
- Andrew Robert James Watt (1872–1950), Australian barrister

== See also ==
- Andrew Wyatt, American musician, songwriter and record producer
- Andrew Watts (disambiguation)
