= Greenhoff =

Greenhoff is a surname. Notable people with the surname include:

- Brian Greenhoff (1953–2013), English footballer
- Frank Greenhoff (1924–1999), English footballer
- Jimmy Greenhoff (born 1946), English footballer

== See also ==
- Greenhough
