= Francis Boyce =

Francis Boyce may refer to:

- Francis Bertie Boyce (1844–1931), Australian social reformer
- Francis Stewart Boyce (1872–1940), his son, Australian politician and judge
