= Cape Hartree =

Cape in the South Orkney Islands

Cape Hartree (60°48′S 44°44′W) is a cape which forms the southwestern tip of Mossman Peninsula on the south coast of Laurie Island, in the South Orkney Islands. To the east of Cape Hartree lie Buchan Bay and Cape Murdoch.

Cape Hartree was discovered on the occasion of the joint cruise in December 1821 by Captain George Powell, a British sealer in the sloop Dove, and Captain Nathaniel Palmer, an American sealer in the sloop James Monroe. The name appears on Powell's map published in 1822.
