= Buchan Bay =

Bay in the South Orkney Islands

Buchan Bay (60°47′S 44°42′W) is a small bay between Cape Hartree and Cape Murdoch, near the southwest end of Laurie Island in the South Orkney Islands. It was charted in 1903 by the Scottish National Antarctic Expedition under William Speirs Bruce, who named it for Alexander Buchan, noted Scottish meteorologist.
