= New Tivoli Theatre, Sydney =

Former theatre and music hall in Sydney, Australia

The New Tivoli Theatre, Sydney, previously known as the Adelphi Theatre and the Grand Opera House, was a theatre and music hall at 329, Castlereagh Street, Sydney, Australia, which was long at the heart of the Tivoli circuit.

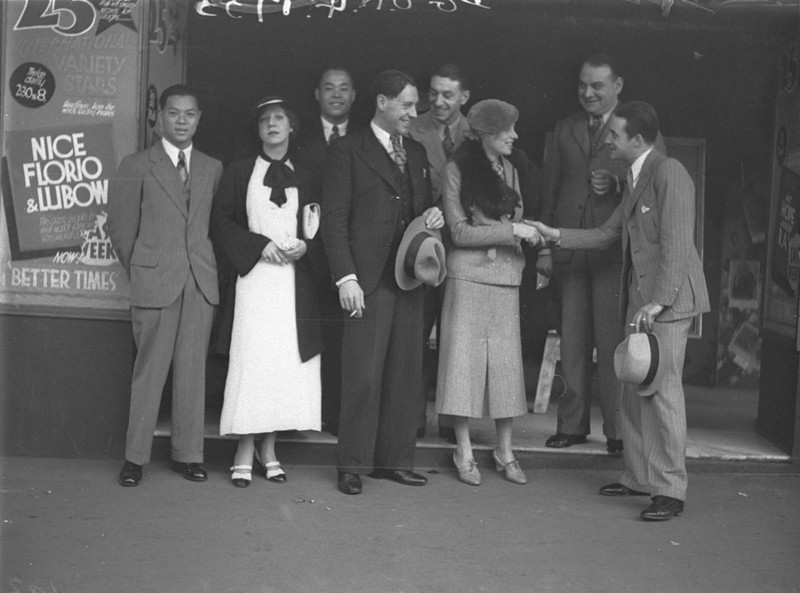
Unidentified Tivoli stars arrive at the theatre

It operated between 1911 and 1966 and from 1932 was often called the Tivoli Theatre.

== History ==
=== Adelphi Theatre ===
The Adelphi Theatre was built in 1911 on half of the site of Sydney's former Paddy's Markets, in the block formed by Campbell, Castlereagh, Hay, and Pitt streets, on land leased from the City of Sydney. It was one of four theatres built in the Haymarket area that year, the other three being picture theatres: the Lyric and New Colonial on George Street for J. D. Williams, and the Orpheum, which stood on the other half of the former Paddy's Markets. Designed by the architects Eaton & Bates, the Adelphi was built of reinforced concrete faced with white marble. The stage was 60 by 60 feet (18 m × 18 m), with a doorway to Pitt Street wide enough for carriages. Its auditorium, licensed to seat 2,400 people, was the first to have its tiers and galleries built on the cantilever principle, instead of iron columns supporting the front of each tier.

The new Adelphi Theatre opened on 5 April 1911 with George Marlow's production of The Bad Girl of the Family.

In October 1915, Marlow's partner and fellow entrepreneur Benjamin Fuller closed the theatre for renovations. The auditorium was redesigned by Henry Eli White to improve sight lines, thus reducing its capacity to 2100 people. The financier and ex-solicitor T. E. Rofe was an early owner or had a large financial interest in the property, as well as, in 1918, the Victoria Theatre.

=== Grand Opera House ===
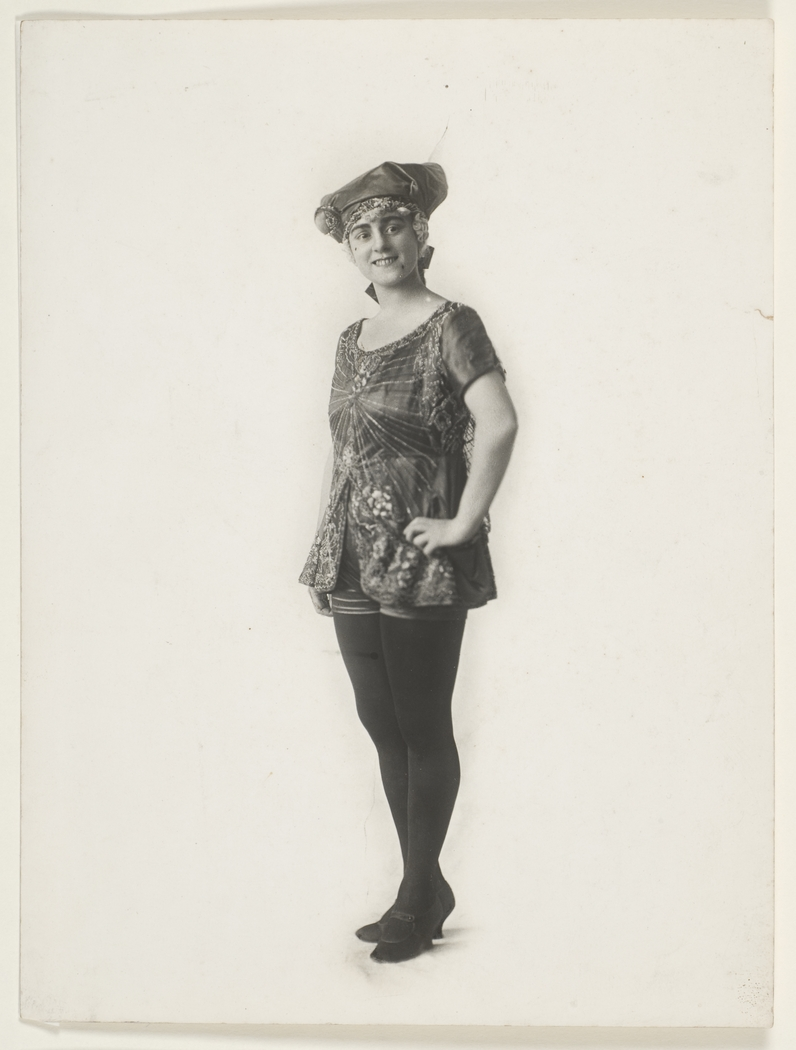
Ivy Moore in Cinderella at the Grand Opera House, December 1919 (New Tivoli Theatre)

The renovated theatre reopened in August 1916, and Benjamin Fuller renamed it the "Grand Opera House", commonly G.O.H.

From 1929, the Grand Opera House became the principal venue in Sydney for variety theatre, featuring vaudeville acts. Christmas pantomimes were well-attended and featured the popular double act "Stiffy and Mo" (Nat Phillips and Roy Rene).

=== New Tivoli Theatre ===
In 1932, two vaudeville performers, Mike Connors and his wife Queenie Paul, took over the lease of the theatre with a company called Con Paul Theatres and renamed it the New Tivoli Theatre. This name was in recognition of Harry Rickards's Tivoli Theatre at 79-83 Castlereigh Street, formerly called the Garrick Theatre, Sydney. This period saw the emergence of well-known Australian entertainers, including Roy Rene and George Wallace. The theatre became famous for its chorus girls, known as "Tivoli tappers".

In late 1935, Tivoli Circuit Australasia Pty Ltd emerged as the controlling organisation, in a period that was seeing an increase in imported acts. A high point was the visit of the Old Vic Company in 1948, when Laurence Olivier and Vivien Leigh performed at the theatre. However, the restrictions of the war years had led to a resurgence of local artists and emerging stars, featuring such names as Peggy Mortimer, Dick Bentley, and Joy and George Nichols.

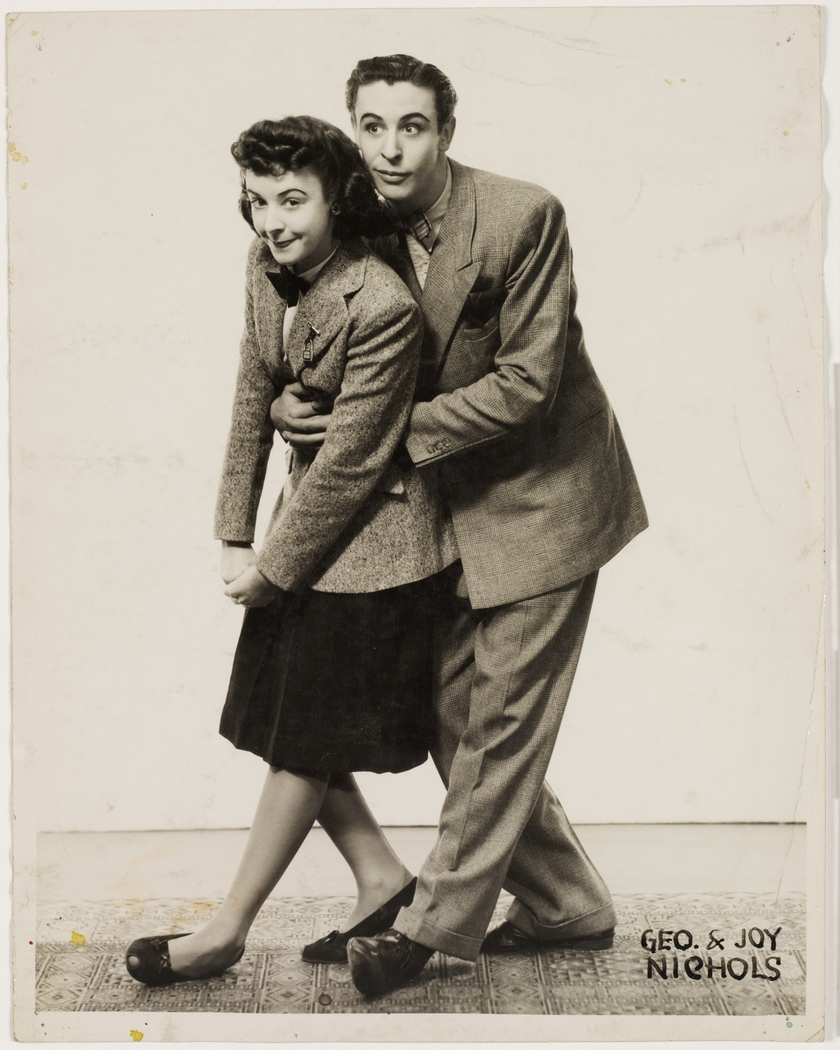
George and Joy Nichols, Impersonators (Tivoli Theatre shows and artists)

The New Tivoli declined after the arrival of television in Australia in 1956, and its last show was staged in 1966, the revue One Dam' Thing After Another, starring Gwen Plumb. In 1969, the theatre was demolished. Its site is now occupied by Central Square, an office tower block between Hay Street and Campbell Street.

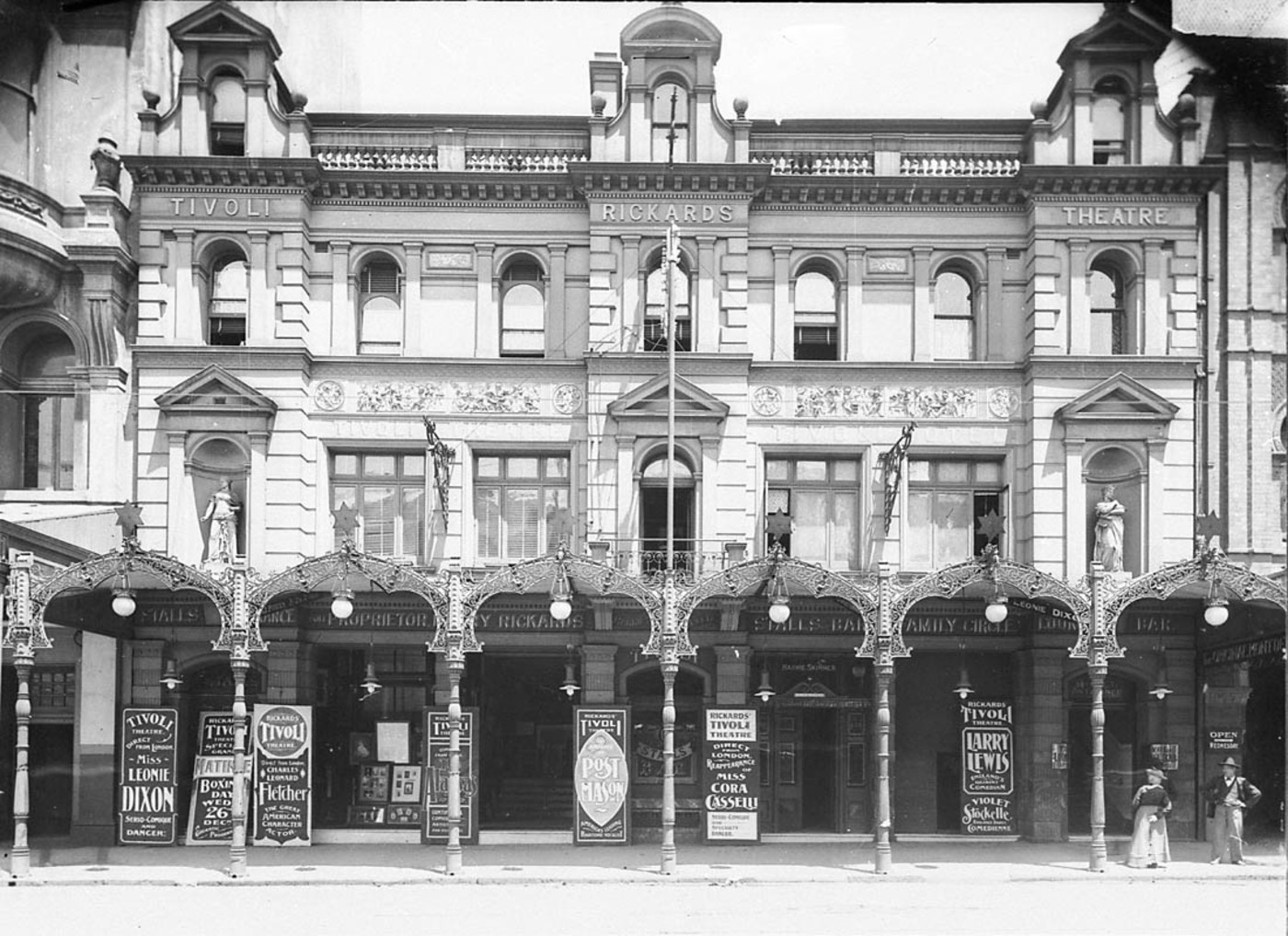
A different theatre, the Tivoli in Castlereagh Street, c. 1907

== See also ==
- Garrick Theatre, Sydney the original Tivoli Theatre in Sydney
- Tivoli circuit
