= Australian Student Christian Movement =

Australian Christian group that works with university students

- Abbreviation: ASCM
- Formation: 1896
- Purpose: youth-led Christian ecumenism
- Region served: Australia
- Affiliations: World Student Christian Federation
- Website: ascm.org.au

The Australian Student Christian Movement (ASCM) is a Progressive Christian student organization in Australia. Its main activities are focused on spirituality, issues of social, economic, and environmental justice, and building autonomous local communities on campuses across the country. It is part of the World Student Christian Federation.

== History ==
Described as a "university within a university", the ASCM was formed in 1896, and is one of the oldest student groups in existence in Australia. Originally named the Australian Student Christian Union (or Australasian Student Christian Union?), the group was established at a meeting in Wyselaski Hall, Ormond College, University of Melbourne, in 1896, 14 years before the 1910 Edinburgh Missionary Conference that is commonly considered to have inaugurated the modern ecumenical movement. At the time Australia had only four universities, which were strongly opposed to any religious activities taking place on their secular campuses. Yet those who created the ASCM fervently believed that Christian students could be agents of change in the university, the nation and the world.

The name changed gradually during the period between the wars to reflect the idea of movement rather than organisation. The title ASCM was formally adopted in the early 1930s.

The ASCM was involved in the formation of the National Union of Students, the Overseas Service Bureau and the Uniting Church in Australia.

== Beliefs ==
ASCM fosters progressive Christian and social views and has been associated with the social gospel, Christian socialist and environmentalist movements and is generally part of the Christian left.

The ASCM sees itself as:

- Open ... encouraging spiritual growth through understanding and tolerance of others’ viewpoints.
- Ecumenical ... welcoming and affirming members from all denominations and valuing the rich diversity of Christian traditions and those of other faiths, while seeking unity in prayer and action.
- Active ... seeking God's desire for peace, justice and liberation from oppression throughout the Bible and life of Jesus, and responding to God's call for conversion of self and transformation of society.
- Critical ... taking the learning of students seriously and looking to theology, the sciences and the humanities to provide new perspectives on faith and a deeper understanding of truth and life.

== Activism ==
The ASCM has had a long history of activism, which led to the movement being monitored by the Commonwealth Investigation Branch (CIB) and Australian Security Intelligence Organisation in the 1940s and 1950s, worried about the ASCM's work with refugees and the pacifism and conscientious objection of some of its members.

During Australian involvement in the Vietnam War, the ASCM was involved in subverting the draft and providing support for so-called draft dodgers.

After the 1965 Freedom Ride through regional New South Wales by Aboriginal activists and students, which exposed racism in Australia and the racial segregation practised in regional towns, ASCM's journal Crux ran a special issue on "Aborigines". This included a guest editorial entitled "No genteel silence" by Ian Spalding on the significance of the Freedom Ride.

The ASCM is involved in the struggles for the liberation of women and of gay, lesbian and bisexual people, in the work against racism against both migrant and Aboriginal people and the exploitation of the people and lands of the Asia-Pacific region. This is reflected in the history of the ASCM with their explicit support for Gandhi, the equality of women and their activism for changes to the White Australia policy which reached its climax in the 1960s with the Sydney branch leading the way. ASCM are still politically active and continue to offer opportunities for students to be involved in Human Rights and a worldwide recognition of women's rights in differing cultures. ASCM is seen to promote a mature faith of intellectual engagement.

== Affiliations ==
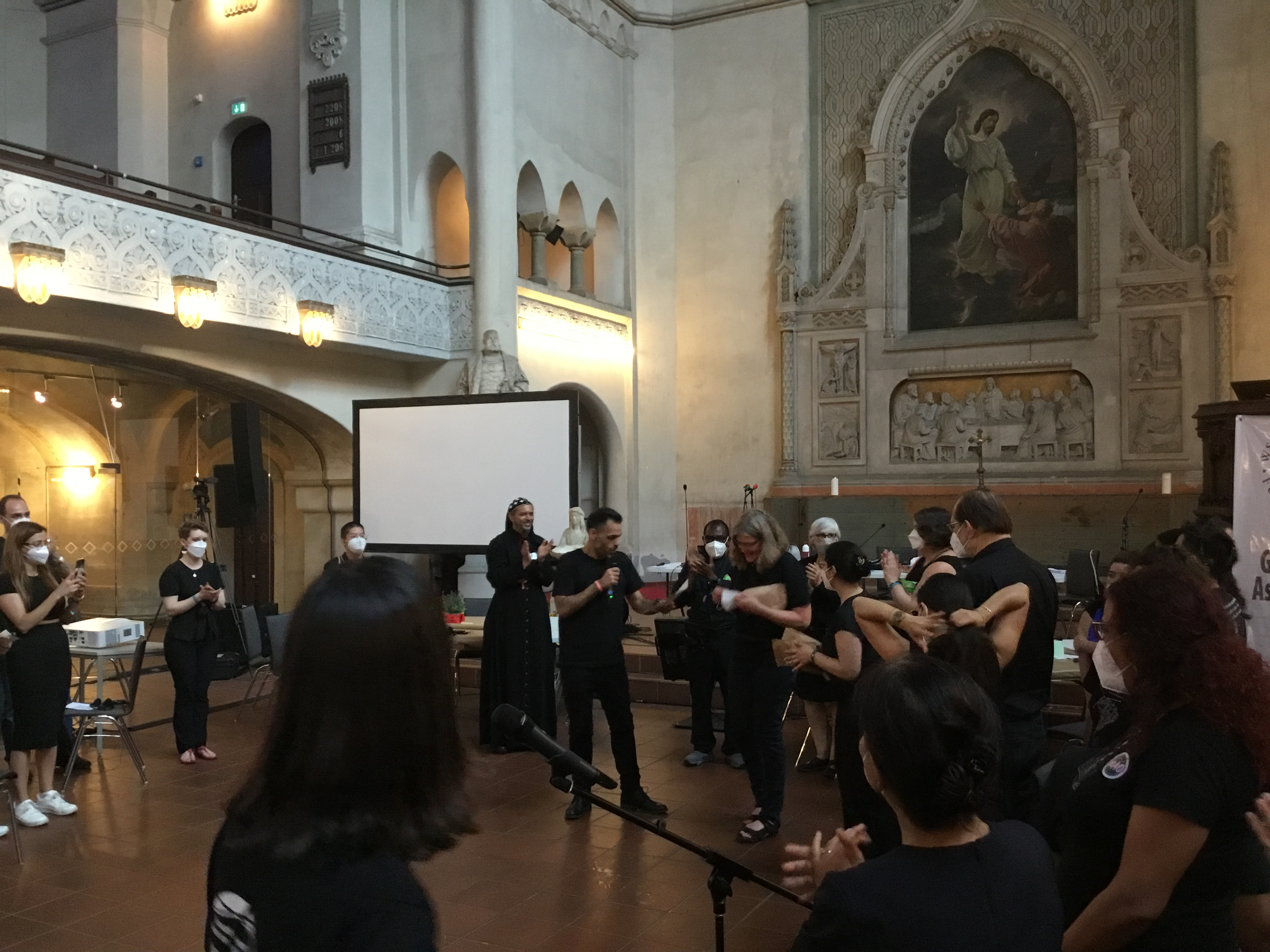
At the 37th General Assembly of the World Student Christian Federation in Berlin, 2022

It is affiliated with the World Student Christian Federation and has close ties to the National Council of Churches in Australia, the Christian Conference of Asia and to the World Council of Churches.

ASCM is part of the World Student Christian Federation Asia-Pacific Region with a biannual Regional Committee Meeting and the Pacific Sub-region (Australia, Aotearoa/New Zealand with Fiji and Papua New Guinea not active.

== Publications ==
ASCM published a journal called Crux in Melbourne between 1961 and 1972. It was bimonthly until 1970, and then quarterly until the end of its run. As of 1965, the journal editors were John and Margaret Howe.

== Conflict ==
There is at times conflict with conservative evangelical Christian groups on campus, such as the Australian Fellowship of Evangelical Students (affiliated to the parachurch International Fellowship of Evangelical Students). While the formation of the ASCM was inspired by the charismatic American evangelical ecumenist, John R. Mott, from the beginning the Australian movement had a tense relationship with evangelicalism, deciding not to adopt Mott's watchword of “the evangelisation of the world in this generation”. The ASCM refused to hold American-style university missions; encouraged liberal Biblical interpretation; and supported the modernist side in the modernist-fundamentalist controversy of the 1920s. In 1930 the Evangelical Union split off from the ASCM; a division that has never been healed. While this split was seen as a catastrophe, by no longer feeling the constraint of conservativism, ASCM had the flexibility to explore liberal issues in a more consistent and concise way. The areas of engagement included science, psychology, humanism and Communism amongst many others.

In the early years of the ASCM's history, conflict was often over issues of theology and biblical interpretation. In later decades the conflict was often over social issues, including sexuality. Since the 1990s, the ASCM has promoted itself as queer- friendly and has supported gay, lesbian and bisexual Christians who have felt hurt by their treatment within conservative Christian groups.

== Notable members ==
- Charles Birch
- Garfield Barwick
- Ernest Burgmann
- Hubert Cunliffe-Jones
- H. V. Evatt
- Herbert Feith
- Bob Hawke
- Margaret Holmes
- Brian Howe
- Leonie Kramer
- John Langmore
- Davis McCaughey
- Robert Menzies
- Thérèse Rein
- Kevin Rudd
- Sydney Sparkes Orr
- John McKellar Stewart
- Marie Tulip
- Ronald Wilson
- H. D'Arcy Wood
- Helen Mary Hill

== See also ==
- Christian ecumenism
- National Council of Churches in Australia
- World Student Christian Federation
