= Theophilus Parr =

Primitive Methodist clergyman and missionary

Rev Theophilus Parr (1849 – 14 June 1922) was a Primitive Methodist clergyman and missionary, remembered in Australia for his ministry in Newcastle, New South Wales.

== History ==
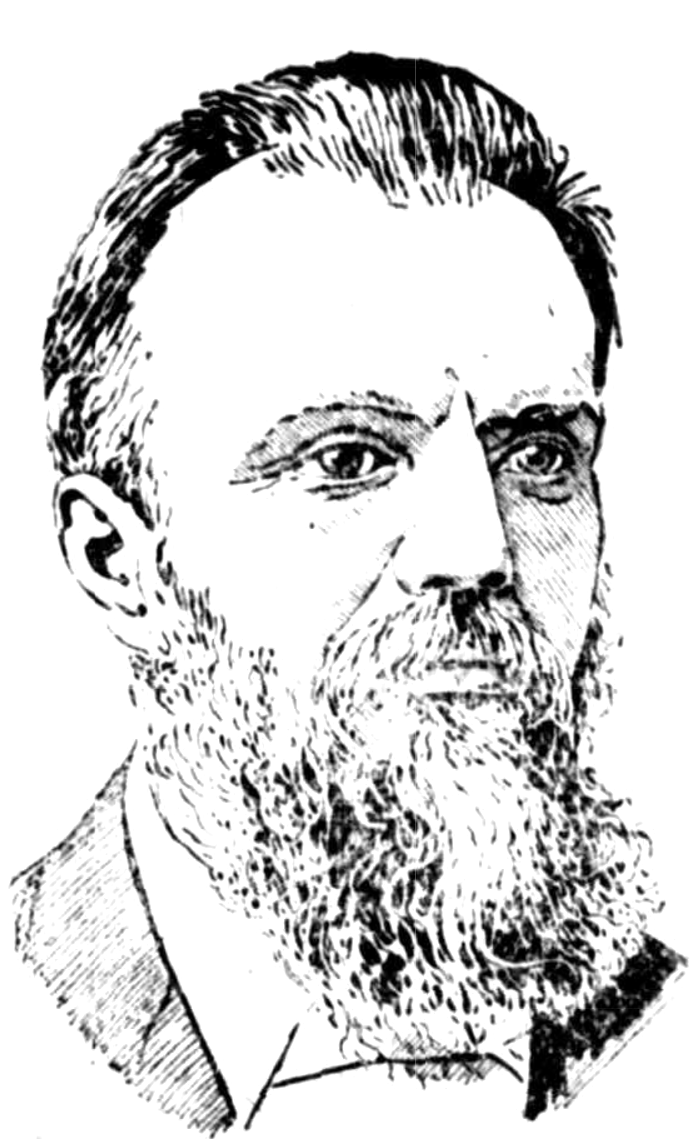
Theophilus Parr

Parr was born in Shropshire, a son of Rev. Thomas Parr, an early Primitive Methodist. At age 11 he was admitted to Queen Mary's Grammar School, Walsall, and after four years passed Oxford's junior middle class examination with honours. He found employment with a firm in Birkenhead and was on the path to commercial success when he decided on a career with the church and in July 1868 was admitted to the ministry in Cheshire, later moving to Boston, Lincolnshire, followed by Oakham, Rutlandshire. He moved to Sheffield, where he married, later accepting a call to the mission on the island of Fernando Po. There he studied the language and compiled a Bubi-English dictionary. After three years he returned to Britain, and was stationed at Edinburgh, where he gained his M.A. degree. He was next stationed in West Bromwich, then in Manchester.

In 1890 he accepted a call to Newcastle, New South Wales and in 1893 moved to Sydney, where he became involved in the Council of Churches, and gained a high reputation as an "earnest and capable minister". Parr, his wife and daughter Mabel became known for their song lectures. The church prospered under his ministry. After three years he returned to Newcastle, in charge of the Wickham circuit, and was closely associated with John Gilbert, his circuit steward. In 1900 he returned to England.

In July 1906 his daughter Mabel Emily Parr married Rev. Harry Percival Fell, son of Rev. B. Fell of the Primitive Methodist Church, Southport. In 1907 he arrived in Bolton, remaining there until 1916, when he retired to live in Manchester. He died in Bolton at the residence of his son, J. T. Parr, following a long illness.
