= D. J. Davies (archdeacon) =

David John Davies (12 February 1879 – 29 June 1935), generally referred to as Rev. D. J. Davies, was the Welshman principal of Moore Theological College in Sydney 1911–1935 and archdeacon in the Anglican Diocese of Sydney 1917–1935.

== History ==
Davies was born in Oswestry, Shropshire, England, a son of Rev. David H. Davies, and was educated at Alderman Davies School at Neath, South Wales. An exhibition enabled him to study at Trinity College, Cambridge University, graduating BA from that university in 1903. He undertook theological training at Ridley Hall, Cambridge, and was ordained by the Bishop of Ely in 1906. He served as curate Holy Trinity, and lectured in History at Emmanuel College and was director of studies in history at Cambridge University. He was elected a Fellow of the Royal Historical Society of England in 1911.

In 1911 he accepted the position of principal of Moore Theological College in Sydney, a post he retained until his death in 1935. In 1913 he began lecturing in history and economics for the University of Sydney. Through his example and leadership the academic reputation of college was advanced.

In 1917 he was chosen as Moorhouse Lecturer at Melbourne University; his lectures were published in book form as The Church and the Plain Man.

He was appointed an archdeacon by Archbishop Wright in 1917.

Described as liberal-minded and experienced, he was an enthusiast for inter-church dialogue, and in 1931 was elected president of the Council of Churches in New South Wales for the coming year.

== Other interests ==
Davies was a very competent student of social and economic problems, and a permanent member of the Social Problems Committee of the Church of England.

He was an authority on church music, and an excellent organist.

He was a prominent Freemason, and served for the last 11 years as Grand Chaplain of the United Grand Lodge of New South Wales.

== Family ==
Davies married Grace Augusta Lawe of Lancashire in 1911; she was also a Cambridge graduate. They had three sons and three daughters, including:

- Eldest son John Francis Lawe Davies married Madge Mason in England on 2 November 1940.
- Susan Davies married Nils Petersen of the Danish Merchant Navy at Llanishen, Wales, near Cardiff.

She was a well-known violinist, and left for England sometime around 1936 to study music at the Royal Academy.

== Last years ==
In 1934, his health declining, he took eight or nine months' leave, renewing old acquaintances in England and Wales.

He died at the Masonic Hospital, Ashfield, New South Wales. He was succeeded as principal of Moore College by Rev. Thomas Chatterton Hammond.

== Publications ==
- The Church and the Plain Man
- The Labour Movement in Australia
- Social Unity and Capitalism
- The Wages System
