= William Gordon Burn Murdoch =

Scottish painter, travel writer and explorer (1862–1939)

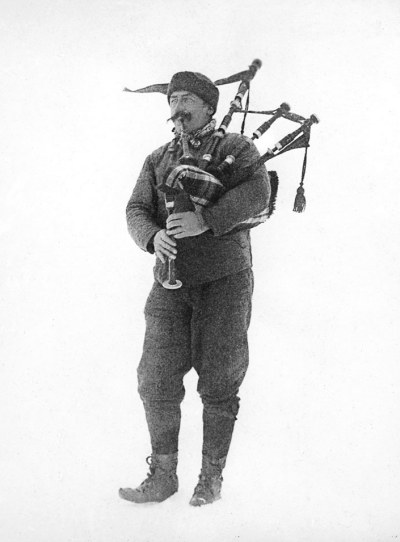
- Burn-Murdoch playing bagpipes in polar environment, 1902-1904
- Born: 22 January 1862; Edinburgh, Scotland
- Died: 19 July 1939 (aged 77); Edinburgh, Scotland
- Occupations: Painter; travel writer; explorer

William Gordon Burn Murdoch (22 January 1862 – 19 July 1939) was a Scottish painter, travel writer and explorer. Murdoch travelled widely including India and both the Arctic and the Antarctic. He is said to be the first person to have played the bagpipes in the Antarctic. He published several travel books as well as being an accomplished artist. A cape in the South Orkneys is named in his honour.

== Life ==
Burn Murdoch was born in Edinburgh to Jessie Cecilia (née Mack) and Dr. William Burn-Murdoch. His father was the first to take the name Burn-Murdoch, but the hyphen was not used by his son. His elder brother, John Burn-Murdoch, joined the military and became the commanding engineer of state railways in India.

He attended a local school and then studied law at Edinburgh University. When he emerged, however, he went to study art in Antwerp and Paris.

Burn Murdoch was closely associated with Patrick Geddes' Fin de Siècle Scottish cultural revival. He and the Symbolist painter John Duncan curated the art content of the Summer Meetings which Geddes organised at University Hall Extension in Edinburgh in the 1880s and '90s. Burn Murdoch contributed illustrations to the Spring, Summer and Winter volumes of The Evergreen: A Northern Seasonal published by Patrick Geddes and Colleagues between 1895 and 1897. He was also involved in Geddes' plan to create a mural around Castlehill Water Reservoir. He created a banner 1.4 metres long showing prominent figures in Scottish history. The mural was never created but colour and monochrome versions of the ten lithographs making up his design were sold.

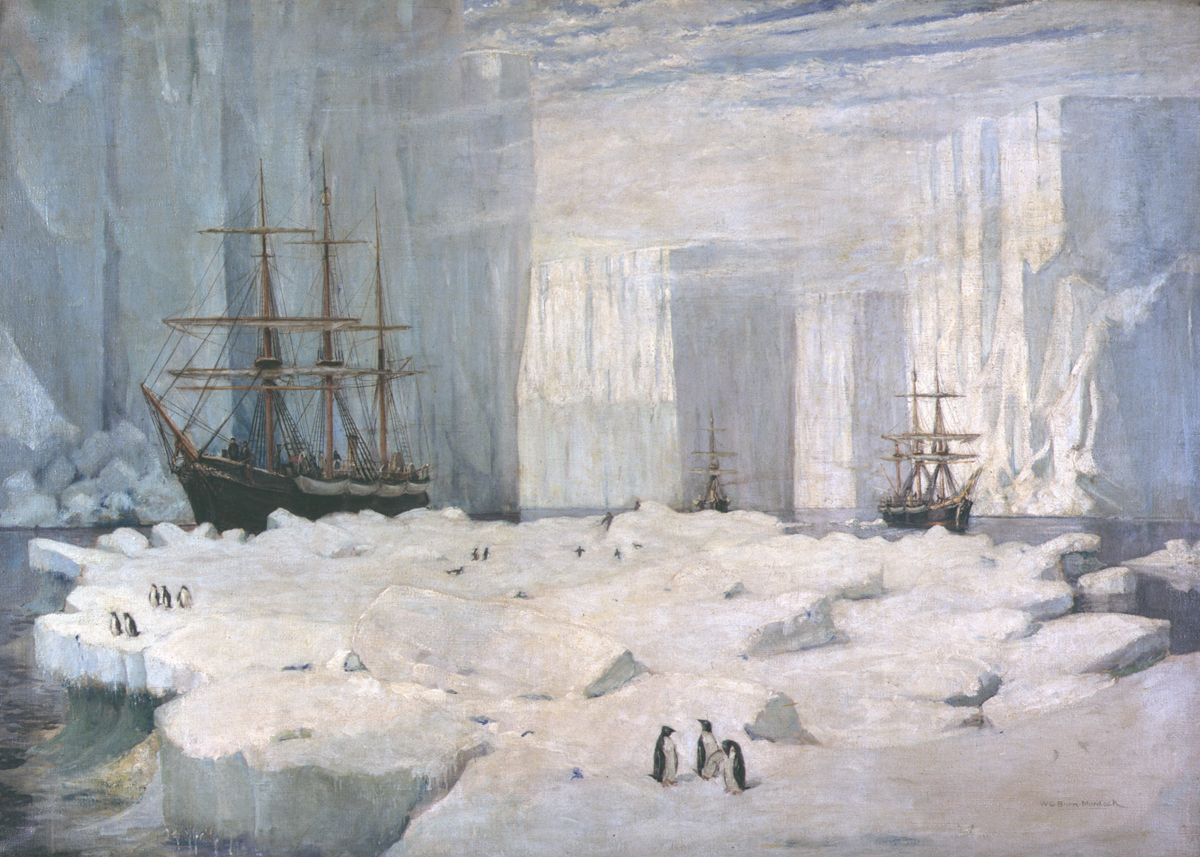
Dundee Antarctic Whaling Expedition 1892

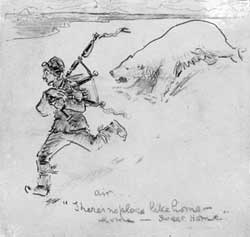
"There's no place like home" by William Gordon Burn Murdoch

Burn Murdoch's first major expedition was in 1892 when he joined an investigative whaling expedition to the Antarctic. He served as an assistant to William Speirs Bruce, a medical student with an interest in oceanography. Burn Murdoch, who was known as "WG" to his friends, used this opportunity to create paintings of their journeys and he had a contract to create a book. With these and his notes he wrote the book Edinburgh to the Antarctic which was published by Longmans in 1894. It was said that he was the first "Artist in Residence" in the Antarctic. Burn Murdoch had mixed feelings about the trip. The expedition had been to the Falkland Islands and Ross Island, and had discovered and named Dundee Island, but the scientific role he was expected to help with was undervalued, and both he and Bruce had been obliged to help with killing 5,000 seals which was the expedition's only hope of commercial success as they had failed to find any commercial whales. Despite these setbacks and having his teeth loosened by scurvy he gained a love of polar exploration.

Burn Murdoch continued his friendship with William Spiers Bruce, whom he had first met at university. He helped him by lending him money and later with organising a number of projects including the Scottish National Antarctic Expedition in 1902–04. During that expedition Bruce surveyed Laurie Island in the South Orkneys. Cape Burn Murdoch on that island is named in his honour. The two of them were later involved with a company that intended to commercially exploit the island of Spitzbergen.

In 1905 he travelled with the Prince and Princess of Wales on their visit to India, which he used as the basis for a book describing his travels in India and Burma. In 1906 he was made a fellow of the Royal Scottish Geographical Society, and he remained an active member. The society own a collection of his work, including a large oil painting in its board room.

After some commercial whaling he published "Modern whaling and bear hunting" in 1917, which he again illustrated and which described his interest in polar bears. The Royal Scottish Geographical Society has humorous cartoons he created featuring polar bears. One of his polar bear sketches was used as an RSGS Christmas card. Burn Murdoch also captured polar bears, and gave a young polar bear to the Zoological Society of Scotland.

Burn Murdoch died in 1939 in Edinburgh. He and his wife had lived at Arthur Lodge, where they entertained visitors, including Roald Amundsen and Robert Falcon Scott. Burn Murdoch was a keen musician as well as an artist, and he claimed to be the first person to have played the bagpipes in the Antarctic.

== Legacy ==
He is noted for saying that he had been to "From the Arctic and Antarctic to 'the back parts of Mull'". His writings and paintings are in a number of institutions, including the Royal Scottish Geographical Society, the Victoria and Albert, and the Perth & Kinross Council and Dundee Museum.
