= Camden College (Congregational Church school) =

Former school in Australia

Camden College was an independent, Congregational Union of Australia, day and boarding school for boys from 1864 until 1877 and theological college for the training of Christian ministers from 1864 until 1974.

== History ==
Thomas Holt and the Congregational Church founded a boys school and theological college at Camden, the former home of Robert Bourne, on 12 July 1864. Camden College, as the institution became known, was just north of the present Camden Street on the border of Newtown and Enmore in New South Wales (NSW).

Samuel Chambers Kent, the Congregational minister in Newtown from 1861, became the founding warden and resident chaplain of Camden College from 1864 to 1872. Kent's portrait hangs in the library of the Uniting Theological College in Parramatta.

Camden and its garden was subdivided in 1877 and the college moved to Glebe. The college buildings, including Camden, were demolished in 1888.

The Congregational Church made Camden available to the Baptist Union, who had no college of their own.

In 1974 prior to the formation of the Uniting Church in Australia from the Congregational Union, the Methodist Church and the Presbyterian Church, Camden College merged with Leigh College and St Andrew's Theological Hall to form the United Theological College, a part of the theology school at Charles Sturt University.

== Rugby union football ==
In the early 1870s Camden College was one of the pioneers of rugby union football in NSW, playing other schools and clubs, in particular in 1874 with games against Sydney's three most prominent clubs Wallaroo FC, Waratah FC and Sydney University FC. In that same year Camden College was one of the eight founding members of the Southern Rugby Football Union (now the NSWRU). Consequent of the changes at the College, 1877 was the rugby team's final season.

== Notable alumni ==
- Arthur Aspinall
- Alexander Petrie Campbell OBE
- C. Bernard Cockett
- Joseph Cullen
- Hubert Cunliffe-Jones
- Harry Kent
- Kenneth Mackay
- Frederick Pratt

== See also ==
- List of non-government schools in New South Wales
- List of boarding schools
