= Buchan Spells =

Proposed meteorological phenomenon

Buchan spells are either cold or warm spells that the 19th century Scottish meteorologist Alexander Buchan claimed happened at roughly the same times each year.

Through statistical analysis, Buchan claimed to have discerned patterns in the Scottish weather that repeated about the same time of the year. He theorized that these were predictable interruptions (either warmer or colder) in the smooth annual transition of temperatures between the seasons.

They are now believed by meteorologists to be random events.

Buchan cold spells:

- 7-14 February
- 11-14 April
- 9-14 May
- 29 June - 4 July
- 6-11 August
- 6-13 November

Buchan warm spells:

- 12-15 July
- 12-15 August
- 3-14 December
