= W. Corly Butler =

Methodist minister in Australia

William Corly Butler (1869 – 15 March 1955), generally known as "Corly" or W. Corly Butler, was a Methodist minister in Australia. Some descendants used "Corly-Butler" as a surname.

== History ==
Butler was born in Dublin, Ireland, a son of James Henry Wilson Butler (c. 1845 – 20 October 1909).

He is reported as travelling to Perth, Western Australia at age 19 and later, as a Primitive Methodist minister, left for South Australia.

=== South Australia ===
In late 1892 he was minister of the Primitive Methodist Churches in Glenelg, also preached at Parkside and St Barnabas's church Kadina. In September 1893 he was registered for celebration of marriages.

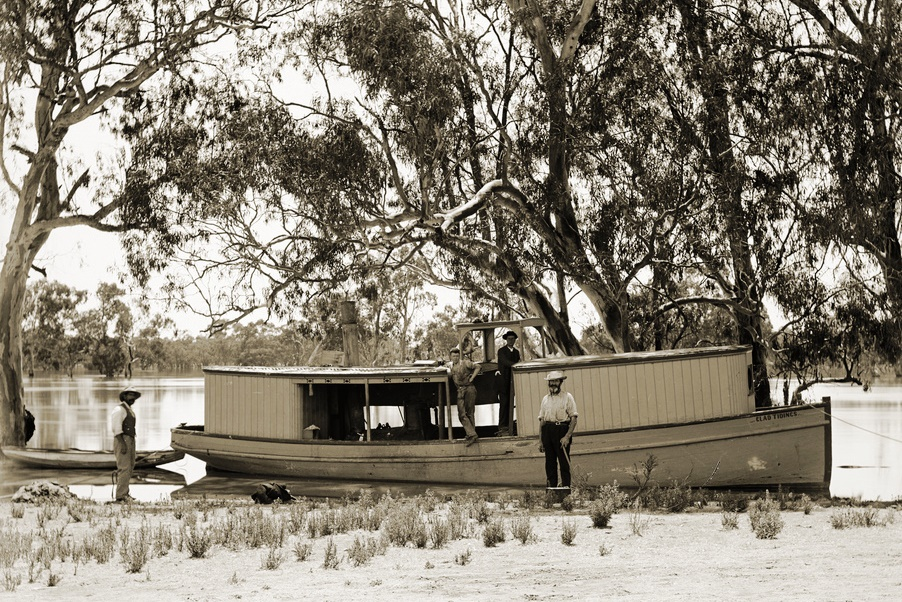
Steam launch "Glad Tidings"

In September 1893 he left for the Primitive Methodist Church at Morgan. In 1894 he purchased from his own funds the twin-screw ex-SA Police launch Dione to travel between village settlements. Renamed Glad Tidings, he provided a multitude of services to settlers at New Era, Kingston, Moorook, Pyap, Wakeri, Ramco, Holder, Murtho, Gillen, and Lyrup (Note: Butler rated Murtho as the best location, Lyrup the most prosperous, Pyap the largest and Wakeri (present-day Waikerie) the most attractive.) on a non-denominational basis, and without taking collection or asking for financial contribution. No mention has been found of Glad Tidings after January 1896.

Thanks to the Chaffey Brothers, the Riverland was "dry": there were no licensed premises in thousands of square kilometres. (Note: The "village settlements" were also "dry" as a condition of their establishment and grant of land by the State Government. Violation of this condition was cited as a contributory cause for the scheme's failures.) In June 1895 Chris Ashwell, editor of the Renmark Pioneer, proposed establishment of a community hotel in the town: owned and managed by the town with its profits invested in local arts and facilities. He argued that a well-run establishment was preferable to the current scourge of sly grog shops and rum running. Butler disagreed, contending that it would inevitably lead to a proliferation of hotels. Ashwell triumphed and the Renmark Local Progress Committee (RLPC) was formed and, with Butler's reluctant support, the South Australian Licensed Victuallers Act was amended to allow a community licence. The RLPC purchased Jane Meissner's temperance hotel and Renmark Community Hotel was established in 1897.

=== Western Australia ===
In April 1897 he was transferred to Subiaco, Western Australia, replacing Rev. John Thomas. Rev. E. Barber, his replacement at Renmark, gave no intention of serving the Settlements. Butler was able to report that, under the "Gothenburg system" in Renmark, sly grog selling had vanished, but alcohol consumption had increased to an extraordinary degree, admitting however that he had only a few months' observations to go by.

In August–September 1899 he was seriously ill but recuperating.

Butler arrived in York, Western Australia in April 1902

He was in Kalgoorlie 1906–1911, succeeding Rev R. Dunstan as superintendent of the Kalgoorlie Methodist circuit.

In 1911 he returned to Subiaco

He spent his last years in Western Australia in charge of the Maylands circuit of the Methodist Church. In April 1921 he left by the RMS Orvieto for Melbourne.

=== Tasmania ===
In 1921 he was assigned to the church on Melville Street, Hobart.

He made headlines for several retorts made after being goaded by Rev H. Worrall: when Worrall called Tasmanians the greatest sinners (for drinking and gambling) in the Commonwealth, Butler reminded him that Hobart did not have Sydney's criminal gangs and murders, in his opinion worse sins. And when Worrall sarcastically offered to accompany Butler if he was afraid of fronting the Governor, Butler replied it was not cowardice but common courtesy.

"One thing that was holding back temperance reform", he declared, "was the intemperance of the statements of temperance advocates."

In 1925 he was elected president of the Tasmanian Council of Churches but was obliged to resign when he was appointed to Geelong, to be succeeded by G. B. Murphy.

=== Victoria ===
He was elected chairman of the Geelong and Ballarat district

In 1929 he became Superintendent of the Sandringham circuit. He was succeeded in Geelong by Rev. J. A. Gault. Rev J. W. Rowe succeeded him as chairman of the Geelong and Ballarat district circuit.

He retired in 1948.

== Family ==
Butler married Annie Lavina (Lavinia?) Renouf (died at Middle Park, Victoria, in 1934), daughter of Phil(l)ip Renouf (died 6 August 1909) of Kew, Victoria and granddaughter of Amice Renouf (died 29 February 1888) of Jersey.

- Florence was mentioned in 1926
- Rev. James Philip Corly-Butler (8 June 1908 – 1968) was twin son. By 1933 he had qualified as Licentiate in Theology (LTh). He married Alice Gwendoline Nettle on 14 April 1936 and was a Flying Officer with RAAF in WWII. His brother Phillip Renouf Corly-Butler died 12 June 1908. J. P. Corly Butler was minister of Omeo in 1935.

He married again aged 66 (c. 1935), to Catherine Mary "Katy" Cornell, daughter of Charles Edward Cornell (c. 1866 – 16 August 1938); they had three children, Charles, Hugh, and Sheila.

They had a home at 41 Sandringham road, Sandringham, Victoria.

== Other interests ==
Butler was interested in astronomy; he gave many popular lectures on associated subjects. He was also a keen gardener, and at various times president or vice-president of the Astronomical Society of Western Australia and the Horticultural Society of Western Australia.

== Publications ==
Aside from newspaper articles, Butler is known for one published short story: "That Pudding", which won for him a prize of £7. It was collected in the 1990 anthology The Gate of Dreams — The Western Mail Annuals 1897–1955 edited by Ffion Murphy and Richard Nile, ISBN 0-949206-84-9
