= Mount Boyce =

Hill in New South Wales, Australia

- Location within New South Wales

Highest point
- Elevation: 1,093 m (3,586 ft)
- Coordinates: 33°37′10″S 150°16′28″E

Geography
- Location: Blue Mountains region in New South Wales, Australia
- Parent range: Blue Mountains

Climbing
- Easiest route: Great Western Highway

Mount Boyce is a hill standing approximately 1,093 metres (3,586 ft) AMSL, situated as one of the highest points on a plateau within the Explorer Range, part of the Blue Mountains Range which is a spur off the Great Dividing Range. Mount Boyce is located 2 kilometres (1.2 mi) north of Blackheath, in New South Wales, Australia.

== Location and features ==
Mount Boyce is situated close to the point where the Great Western Highway passes by the location of a heavy vehicle checking station. Approximately 300 metres (980 ft) west of Mount Boyce, the land drops sharply in cliffs and steep slopes to the Kanimbla Valley.

Mount Boyce was named on 26 April 1923 in honour of Venerable Archdeacon Francis Bertie Boyce FRGS, FRHS, an Australian clergyman and social reformer, who was born in England in 1844 and died in Blackheath in 1931.

== Climate ==
Mount Boyce has an oceanic climate with mild summers and cool to cold winters. Due to its elevation, it has a highland influence.

Climate data for Mount Boyce AWS (1990–2020); 1,080 m AMSL; 33.62° S, 150.27° E
Month	Jan	Feb	Mar	Apr	May	Jun	Jul	Aug	Sep	Oct	Nov	Dec	Year
Record high °C (°F)	38.0 (100.4)	38.0 (100.4)	34.2 (93.6)	28.1 (82.6)	26.3 (79.3)	23.0 (73.4)	17.4 (63.3)	20.7 (69.3)	27.6 (81.7)	29.3 (84.7)	35.5 (95.9)	37.5 (99.5)	38.0 (100.4)
Mean daily maximum °C (°F)	24.4 (75.9)	23.0 (73.4)	20.6 (69.1)	17.3 (63.1)	13.6 (56.5)	10.1 (50.2)	9.6 (49.3)	11.3 (52.3)	14.8 (58.6)	17.9 (64.2)	20.4 (68.7)	22.8 (73.0)	17.2 (62.9)
Mean daily minimum °C (°F)	13.5 (56.3)	13.2 (55.8)	11.4 (52.5)	8.8 (47.8)	6.1 (43.0)	3.8 (38.8)	2.6 (36.7)	3.0 (37.4)	5.4 (41.7)	7.7 (45.9)	9.8 (49.6)	11.7 (53.1)	8.1 (46.5)
Record low °C (°F)	4.3 (39.7)	3.8 (38.8)	2.9 (37.2)	−0.9 (30.4)	−2.2 (28.0)	−3.0 (26.6)	−3.4 (25.9)	−3.6 (25.5)	−3.6 (25.5)	−1.5 (29.3)	0.2 (32.4)	2.4 (36.3)	−3.6 (25.5)
Average precipitation mm (inches)	118.1 (4.65)	138.6 (5.46)	117.5 (4.63)	63.9 (2.52)	52.1 (2.05)	77.7 (3.06)	41.4 (1.63)	53.8 (2.12)	54.6 (2.15)	67.7 (2.67)	99.8 (3.93)	81.4 (3.20)	966.6 (38.07)
Average precipitation days	16.1	16.2	17.0	14.4	12.6	15.0	14.2	11.9	11.3	13.5	16.5	16.2	174.9
Average afternoon relative humidity (%)	58	66	65	63	69	72	69	59	56	54	61	57	62

== See also ==
- List of mountains in New South Wales
