= Garrick Theatre (Sydney) =

Former theatre and music hall in Sydney, Australia

Garrick Theatre, later Tivoli Theatre
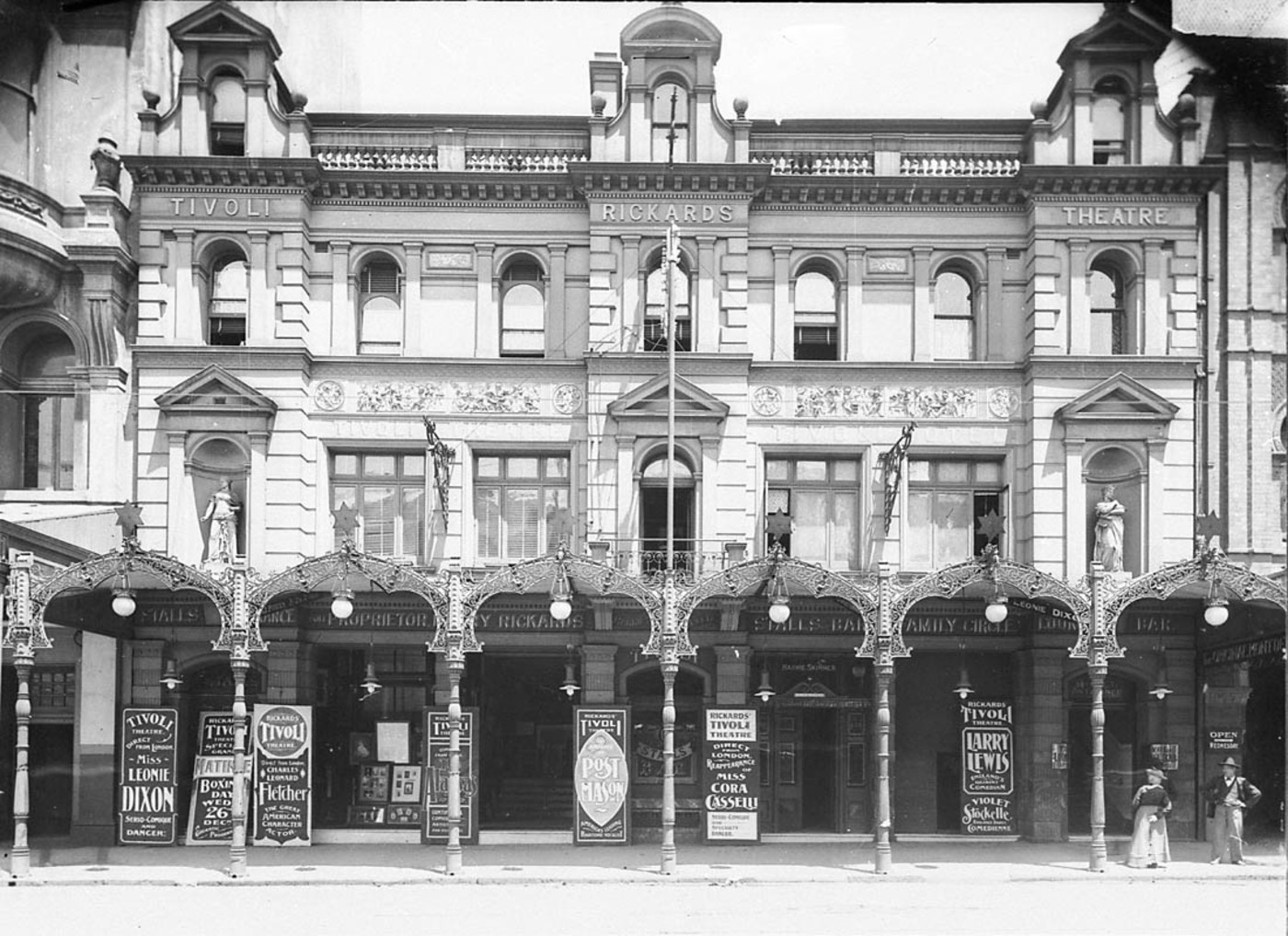
- Façade of the Tivoli Theatre (formerly Garrick Theatre), Sydney, 1905-1911
- Interactive map of Garrick Theatre, later Tivoli Theatre
- Address: 79–83 Castlereagh Street; Sydney; Australia
- Coordinates: 33.87015°S 151.20945°E

Construction
- Opened: 1890
- Closed: 1929
- Rebuilt: 1900
- Years active: 1890–1929

The Garrick Theatre was a theatre and music hall at 79–83 Castlereagh Street in Sydney from 1890 to 1929. The theatre was renamed the Tivoli Theatre in 1893 and operated as a popular vaudeville venue. It was destroyed by fire in 1899 and rebuilt. The theatre closed in 1929.

== Location ==
The location of the Garrick Theatre on Castlereagh Street in Sydney had a history of use for entertainment venues including a circus (Olympic Circus 1851–1852), a theatre (including the Royal Marionette Theatre of Australia, and the Royal Albert Theatre, 1852–1854), a dance hall (Scandinavian Hall) a variety house (Victoria Hall 1880s) and finally as the Academy of Music. In 1887 the Colonial Architect forced the closure of the venue and three years later in 1890 it was demolished to make way for the Garrick Theatre.

== History ==
=== Garrick Theatre ===
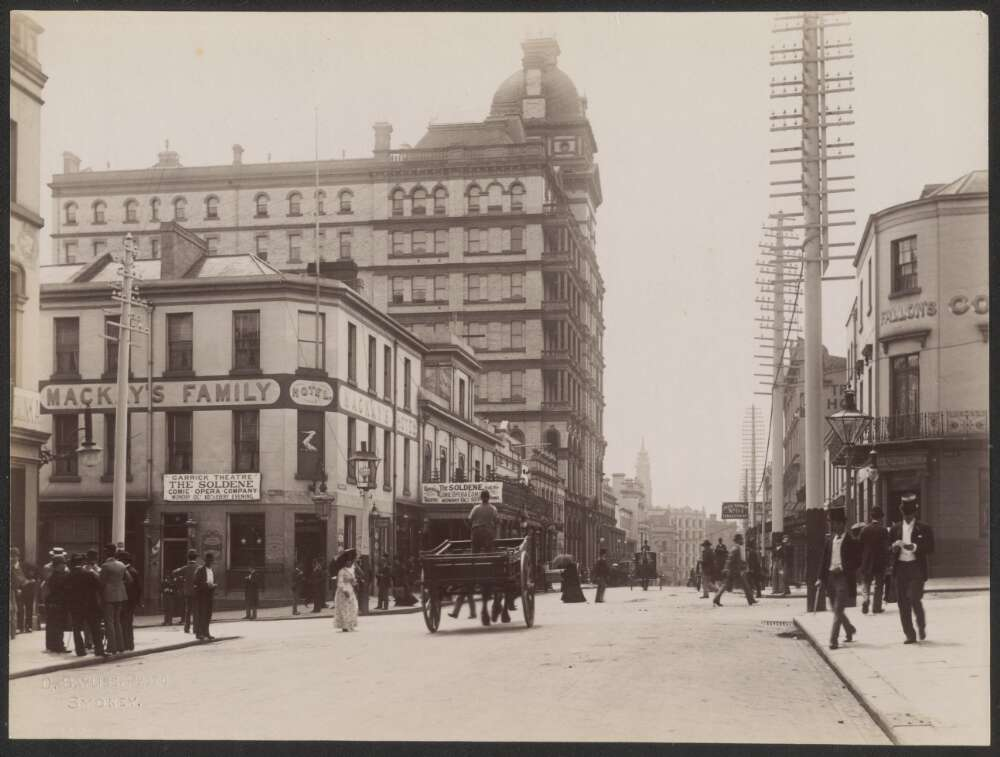
Garrick Theatre on Castlereagh Street looking north, Sydney, New South Wales, ca. 1890

The Garrick Theatre was designed by the architect E. Weitzel, built by Messrs. Brown and Tapson and the principal decorators were Messrs. H. H. Groth, Jun., and Co. and the ceiling murals were painted by Lorenzini. The building was in the Federation Free Classical architectural style.

The auditorium of the theatre was 45 ft x 55 ft and could seat approximately 1,000 people in the stalls, orchestra chairs, dress circle, family circle, and private boxes.

The Garrick Theatre opened on 22 December 1890.

=== Tivoli Theatre ===
In February 1893 Harry Rickards, the vaudeville showman, took over the lease of the Garrick Theatre renaming it the Tivoli Theatre. He made some changes to the building, raising the orchestra pit and installing another sliding roof and opened on 18 February 1893.

The building was destroyed by fire in 1899. It was rebuilt after the fire with a new building behind the remaining facade of the former theatre and reopened on 12 April 1900. The new building was larger and could seat 1,200 people. A collection of the Tivoli Theatre programs from 1893 to 1912 is held in the collections of the State Library of New South Wales.

Following Rickards death the Tivoli Theatre continued to operate until J. C. Williamson's closed it down in 1929.

== See also ==
- New Tivoli Theatre, Sydney
- Tivoli circuit
