= Alexander Buchan (meteorologist) =

British botanist and climate scientist

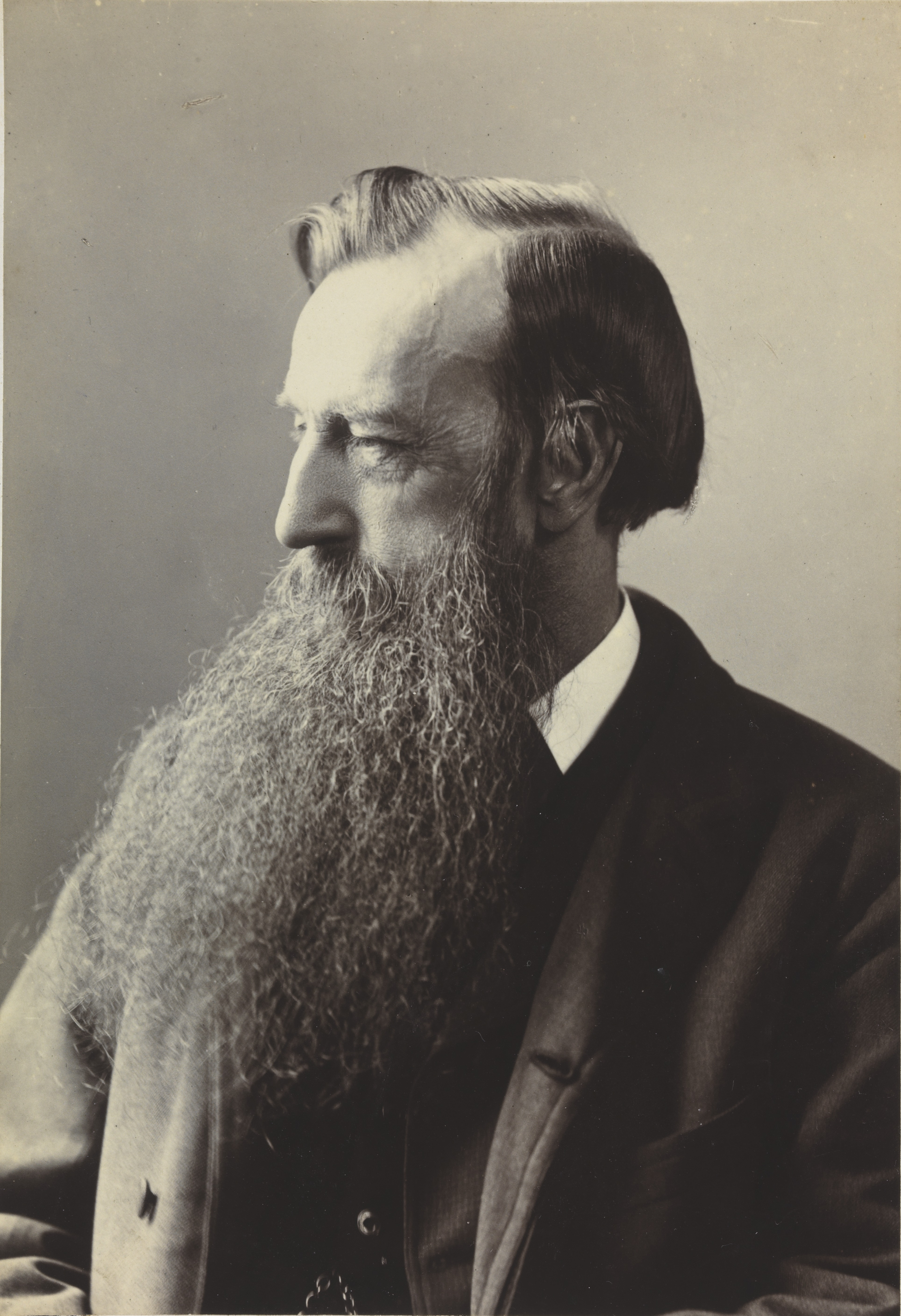
- Born: 11 April 1829; Kinnesswood, Scotland
- Died: 13 May 1907 (aged 78); Edinburgh, Scotland
- Education: University of Edinburgh

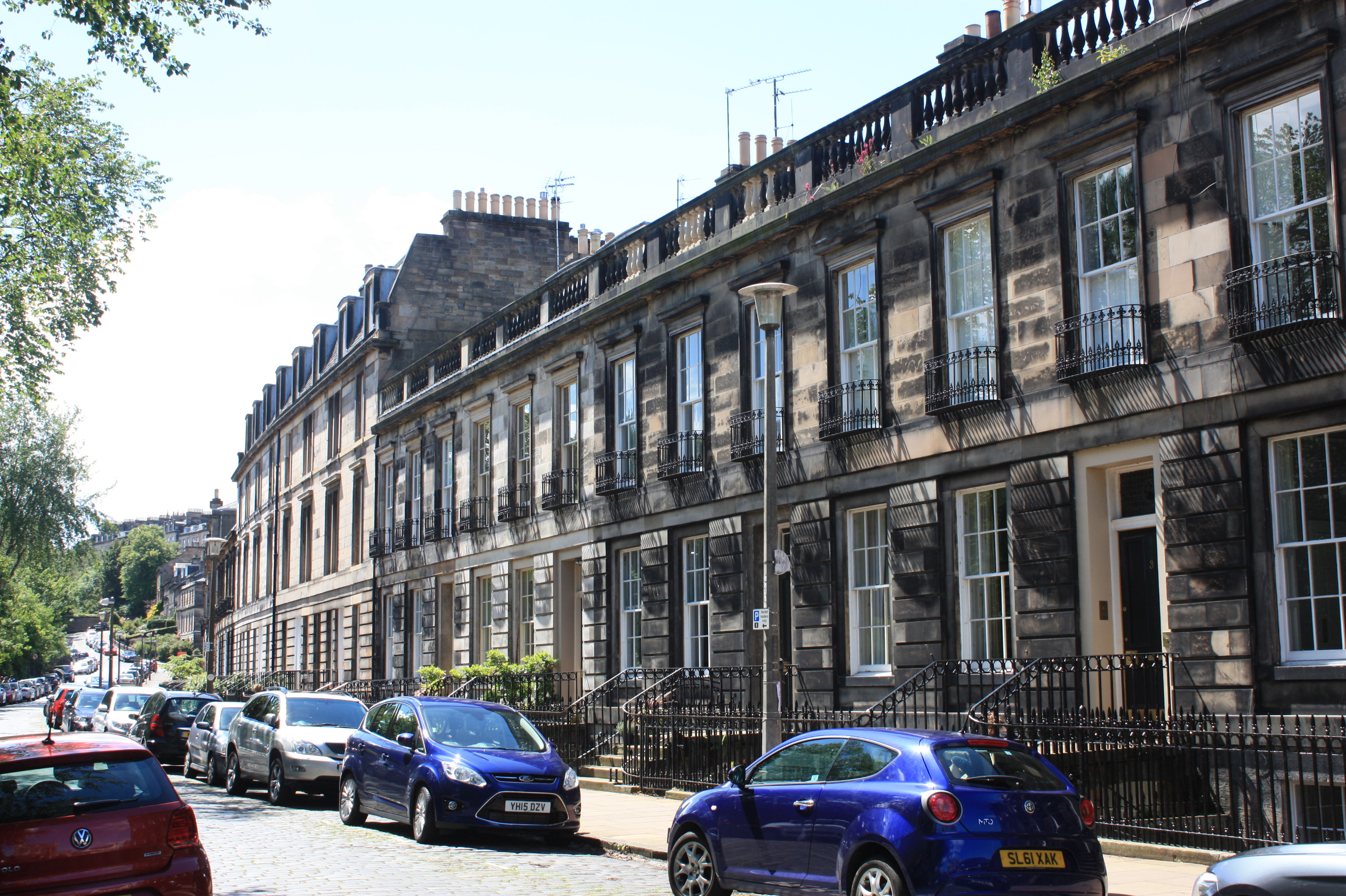
Dean Terrace, Edinburgh, home of Alexander Buchan

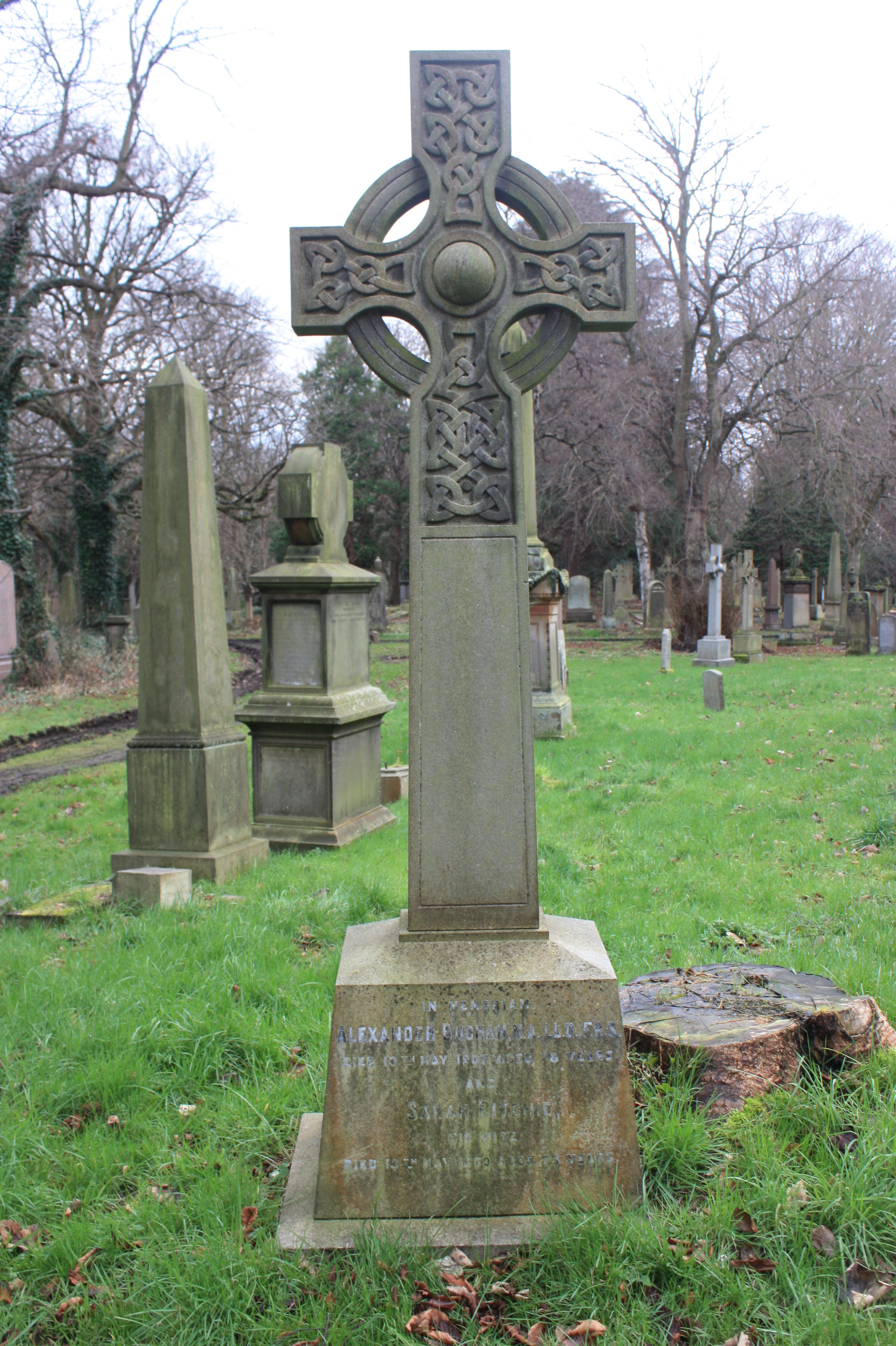
The grave of Alexander Buchan, Warriston Cemetery, Edinburgh

Alexander Buchan FRS FRSE (11 April 1829 – 13 May 1907) was a Scottish meteorologist, oceanographer and botanist and is credited with establishing the weather map as the basis of modern weather forecasting. He also proposed the theory of Buchan Spells.

== Life ==
Buchan was born in Kinnesswood on the north side of Loch Leven, the son of Alexander Buchan, a weaver, and Margaret Day Hill. He was educated at the Free Church College in Edinburgh and at Edinburgh University.

He was Secretary of the Scottish Meteorological Society for 47 years. From 1860 until his death he was the editor of the Journal of the Scottish Meteorological Society and he was also a member of the Council of the Meteorological Office as well as the curator of the library of the Royal Society of Edinburgh. He was instrumental in establishing the Ben Nevis observatory. Buchan prepared meteorological and oceanographic reports for the Challenger Expedition.

In 1870 he was elected President of the Botanical Society of Edinburgh. He was then living at 72 Northumberland Street in Edinburgh's Second New Town.

Buchan was elected a Fellow of the Royal Society of Edinburgh in 1868 and became its Curator in 1878 and served until 1906. He was also their Vice President 1906–1907.

He received the Makdougall-Brisbane prize in 1876 and the Gunning Victoria Jubilee prize in 1893 of the Royal Society of Edinburgh. He was elected a Fellow of the Royal Society of London in 1898. He was the first recipient of the Symons Gold Medal of the Royal Meteorological Society in 1902.

Buchan died at home, 2 Dean Terrace in Stockbridge, Edinburgh on 13 May 1907 and is buried in Warriston Cemetery on the north side of the city. The Celtic cross marking his grave stands close to a junction on the paths 50m south of the monument to James Young Simpson at the end of the central vaults. He was replaced in his role at the Royal Meteorological Society by Andrew Watt.

The Buchan Prize, named in his honour, was instituted to commemorate the amalgamation in 1921 of the Scottish Meteorological Society and the Royal Meteorological Society.

== Publications ==
- The Atmospheric Circulation
- Handy book of Meteorology (1867)
- Introductory Textbook of Meteorology (1871)
- Encyclopædia Britannica 9th edition: Atmosphere (1875)

== Family ==
In 1864, he married Sarah Ritchie (died 1900). His niece, Jessie Hill Buchan, an expert calculator, was his assistant until her death in 1905.

== See also ==
- Buchan Bay on Laurie Island named after Alexander Buchan.
- Ordnance Gazetteer of Scotland: A Graphic and Accurate Description of Every Place in Scotland (Buchan contributed its section on Scotland's meteorology)
