= New South Wales Council of Churches =

New South Wales Council of Churches was a body of leaders from the evangelical Christian churches, and for a time the Church of England, of the city of Sydney and the Australian state of New South Wales. It was formed to present a unified front to influence public discourse and government policy, and also served to increase communication and cooperation between rival churches with similar aims and philosophies. This article traces the history of the body through its presidents and other officeholders.

== History ==
=== First incarnation ===
Rev. John Walker founded and was secretary of the first Council of the Churches in 1889, apparently called by him to fight relaxation of the laws governing public entertainment on Sunday. Delegates, 32 in all, were appointed by the Sydney churches of the participating denominations: Church of England, Presbyterian, Wesleyan Methodist, Baptist, and Primitive Methodist. The rules provided for no president; a chairman was elected from the delegates at each meeting, held monthly in the YMCA hall. In 1895 Walker resigned, to be replaced by William Allen, who was replaced in 1896 by Rev. Theophilus Parr.

Apart from the secretary, no mention has been found of any other continuing office, although William George Taylor has been mentioned as president of the New South Wales Council of the Churches in 1899. and C. James Tinsley, Baptist preacher, sometime around 1905, but these may refer to a different body:

- In 1899 the Congregational and Baptist churches founded the "Evangelical Council of New South Wales", with the same aims and similar membership. The Evangelical Council ceased to exist with the eighteenth Christian Conference at the Petersham Town Hall in 1914.
- An independent Council of Churches was formed in Newcastle in 1897

By 1899 the council was a spent force; one problem as outlined by Professor Rentoul was that the great churches had no more rights than "miserable little sects". Great umbrage was taken, however, at the formation of the rival Evangelical Council.

=== Second incarnation ===
In 1924 a new council was formulated by representatives of the Anglican, Presbyterian, Methodist, Baptist, and Congregational Churches, the Associated Churches of Christ, the Salvation Army, and the Society of Friends, but its institution was held up by Anglican Church red tape.

- F. H. Rayward was the first secretary and president
- 1925 D'Arcy Irvine

Dr Carruthers elected secretary. Victor C. Bell followed as secretary
In this year the NSW Council joined with those of other States in hosting evangelist Gipsy Smith in 1926.

- 1926 Archdeacon Boyce
- 1927 P. J. Stephen (Methodist)
- 1928 Dr A. J. Waldock (Baptist)
- 1928 P. J. Steven
- 1929 Victor C. Bell (Methodist/Presbyterian)
- 1930 Albert Edward West (c. 1863–1945) (Congregational)

Council approved establishment of an AM radio station

- 1931 D. J. Davies (Anglican)
- 1932 D. J. Davies
- 1933 T. E. Rofe
- 1934 William Cooper (Society of Friends)
- 1935 W. H. Jones (Methodist)

In 1936 the Church of England formally withdrew its support for the Council.

- 1936 Charles Alfred White
- 1937 Wilfred L. Jarvis

Changes following Anglican withdrawal

- 1938 Frank Bell, of the Salvation Army
- 1939 Rupert J. Williams, Methodist
- 1940 C. A. White (2nd term)
- 1941 C. Bernard Cockett
- 1942 Dr H. Whitmore Dart
- 1943 J. H. G. Auld
- 1944 A. C. McLean (of Churches of Christ)
- 1945 T. Manning Taylor
- 1946 S. Arthur Eastman (Presbyterian) (Note: Eastman was joint founder of Council of Churches radio station 2CH in Sydney. In 1944, the NSW Council of Churches sub-let the licence to Amalgamated Wireless (Australasia) who provided program content for six days per week, with the Council of Churches being responsible for programming on Sundays. In 1994 they sold the licence to John Singleton.)

Anglican Church rejoins council

- 1947 S. A. (A. S.?) Eastman
- 1948 S. Barton Babbage (Dean of Sydney)

Courtenay Thomas secretary

- 1949 Major Nicholson
- 1950 H. W. K. Mowll
- 1951 S. W. McKibbin (McKibbon ?)
- 1952 Cumming Thom

R. G. Fillingham secretary

- 1953 Cumming Thom (Presbyterian)
- 1954 Cumming Thom

See also

- Ross Clifford
- Margaret Rodgers (deaconess)
- Josiah Thomas (politician)
