= P. J. Stephen =

Methodist minister

Patrick John Stephen (2 February 1864 – 22 July 1938), commonly referred to as Rev. P. J. Stephen, was a Methodist minister in Sydney, Australia.

== History ==
Stephen was born in Peterhead, Scotland, a son of a whaling captain.

He was employed in business in Glasgow before entering theological college, and after serving as a Wesleyan Methodist minister in London, in 1886 was sent to New South Wales, where he was appointed to the Burwood circuit, whose superintendent was Rev. B. J. Meek. After a few years' probation he was sent to Balmain, where he remained for six years, during which time he founded the Balmain Central Mission, the second in New South Wales. He was then sent to Parramatta, and after three years accepted an invitation to the church in Regent Street, Sydney, where he established the South Sydney Mission. His next posting was to West Maitland for three years, which he remembered as a very happy time. He was then appointed to Leichhardt, where he remained for five years, establishing another central mission.

He was elected president of the Christian Endeavour Union of NSW in 1896.

Around 1912 the Sydney Central Mission moved from the old Centenary Hall to the Lyceum Hall, and the Methodist Conference appointed him colleague of Rev. William George Taylor (c. 1844 – September 1934), founder of Sydney's Central Methodist Mission, with a view to succeeding him as Superintendent, which post he held for two years, but then his health broke down, and he resigned from the mission, transferring to the Newtown circuit, but a year later he had another reversal, and the Conference appointed him to Lindfield, where he recovered somewhat.

In 1917 he was elected president of the Methodist Conference.

In 1927 he was elected president of the Council of Churches in New South Wales.

He died at a private hospital in Ashfield, and his remains buried in the Methodist section of Rookwood Cemetery.

== Other interests ==
Stephen was reported as having one of the finest private libraries in New South Wales.

== Recognition ==
In 1939 windows were erected at the Ashfield Methodist Church in his memory. In 1948 a refurbished vestry and window at the Homebush Methodist Church were dedicated to his memory.

== Family ==
In 1890 Stephen married Mary Amy Blackmore (died 29 July 1949), daughter of solicitor Samuel Fry Blackmore (died 1912).

The Rev. Alex. Stephen (died 1941) was a brother.
