= William Cooper (Quaker) =

William Cooper (1856 – 15 January 1952) was a leading member of the Society of Friends in Sydney, Australia. He was a director of the Cadbury-Fry-Pascall, the Australian offshoot of Cadbury Ltd, the chocolate manufacturers.

== History ==
Cooper was born in Edgmond, Shropshire, Eliza Cooper, née Downes, and Thomas Cooper, bricklayer and builder, adherents of the Primitive Methodist denomination, of which Thomas Cooper was a longtime Sunday School teacher and superintendent. Cooper grew up a lover of the Bible and strict observer of the Sabbath.

Cooper received his earliest education at a dame school, followed by the local primary school then a grammar school at nearby Newport, the headmaster of which dissuaded him from going up to Oxford, instead finding him a position with the post office in Birmingham. He began worshipping at the local Wesleyan Methodist church, where a fellow-congregant suggested he find employment with Cadbury Brothers, who had an office at Bridge Street, where he commenced in 1879. Shortly after, the company moved its headquarters to Bournville, Cooper with them. While in their employ, he became involved with several self-improvement and religious discussion groups, one of which was the Society of Friends. Following a bout of illness, Cooper was put to work as a commercial traveller, then a year later offered a position as one of two Cadbury's representatives in Australia, the other being Thomas E. Edwards; Cooper being responsible for New South Wales and Queensland, while Edwards had the rest of the country and New Zealand.

=== Business ===
Cooper (and Edwards?) left for Sydney in July 1882. Following an increase in business, his brother Thomas Edward Cooper (1867 – 15 September 1947), who became a Cadbury employee, joined him in 1887 and had a long and distinguished career with the company before retiring in 1927. Thomas Edwards retired in 1903 and Cooper became Cadbury's general manager for Australia. In 1921 the firm in Australia became Cadbury-Fry-Pascall Limited, with Cooper as Chairman of the Board of Directors, and was tasked with establishment of a factory in Claremont, Tasmania, prompted by a rapidly expanding market and the Australian Government's continuation of wartime restrictions on imported luxuries. The Claremont site was selected in May 1920 by the Cooper brothers and Edward Harrison Colleyshaw; they oversaw its development up to 1922 when full-scale production began. Cooper retired in 1928.

=== Religion and philosophy ===
On arriving in Sydney, Cooper joined the Pitt Street Congregational Church, but he could not ignore Quakerism and its connection to Cadbury's and the chocolate industry, which had its foundation in temperance. Around 1888 he joined Sydney's Society of Friends, which met monthly, and gradually became a major part of his life: He was

- clerk of Sydney Friends' monthly meeting for 25 years
- (intermittently) teacher of the Adult School for 40 years
- clerk of the Australian Friends' Annual General Meeting for 18 years

This included 1914–1919, the years of the Great War, when Quakers led the pacifist cause.
He retired from this position in September 1920, at Friends' meeting in Hobart at which he presided.

- Australian representative at Friends' conventions in London

Cooper was strongly opposed to war, being contrary to Christ's teachings, and publicly opposed conscription. He personally believed that war could be replaced by arbitration in all cases. Several of his sons served in Britain, France and Belgium in the Friends' Ambulance Unit, "serving nobly" by rescuing battlefield casualties and nursing the injured. Another, who arrived in Belgium after the Armistice, and served with the American Red Cross.

== Other interests ==
- Cooper was a member of the League of Nations Union, the British and Foreign Bible Society, the Association for the Protection of Native Races, the White Cross League, the Council of Churches in New South Wales (elected president in 1934), and the New South Wales Temperance Alliance.
- He was chairman of the board of The Friends' School, Hobart 1924–1949.
- In 1897 he joined the board of the Benevolent Society of New South Wales, serving as vice-president from 1911 and president 1920–1925.
- He became a vice-president of the New South Wales Branch of the London Peace Society when it was formed in 1907.

He became president when Rose Scott stepped down in 1916.

== Family ==
Cooper married Ellen Louisa "Lily" Mossop, née Baynes (1866 – 31 July 1951), widow of his friend Rev. Livingstone Mossop, in Brisbane on 26 October 1891. Their children included:

- William Livingstone Cooper (September 1892 – ), born in Sydney; he followed his father at Cadbury's, as did his brother Howard.
- Five more sons and a daughter followed between 1895 and 1907
