= Charles Alfred White =

Australian Presbyterian minister

Charles Alfred White (27 July 1869 - 4 January 1954), also known as C. A. White, was a Presbyterian minister in New South Wales, Australia. He compiled a history of the Presbyterian Church in Australia to c. 1950, published as Challenge of the Years (1951).

== Early life and education ==
White was born in Warialda near Myall Creek, New South Wales, a son of Alfred James White (died before 1880) and Maria Isabella White, née Alderson. He was educated at Inverell Primary School and Armidale Grammar School, and studied philosophy at Sydney University, graduating with a B.A. with honours in 1895. He studied theology under George Grimm, James Cosh, and John Kinross.

== Ministry ==
White was licensed and ordained in the Presbyterian Church in 1896 and inducted to the parish of Windsor on 12 December 1896. He served there for four years before transferring to the parish of Wollongong in 1900, then to Stanmore in 1903 and Auburn in 1912.

He was appointed the church's Foreign Missionary secretary in 1916 and in 1917 visited the church's mission at Sholinghur, India. He then served as minister of Park Church, South Brisbane from 1920 to 1924, when he resigned for personal reasons. He was elected Moderator of the Presbyterian Church of Queensland in 1924.

He subsequently served at the Bowenfels parish (which includes the town of Lithgow) from 1925 and at North Strathfield from 1931 to 1937.

== Church leadership ==
White served on numerous church committees, including as convenor of the Statistics, Welfare of Youth, Evangelistic, Church and Manse Loan Fund, and Foreign Missions committees.

In 1930 he was appointed Moderator of the Presbyterian Church of New South Wales. He was a delegate to the Council of Churches in New South Wales and was elected its president in 1936.

== Retirement and death ==
White retired in 1937 and spent much of his time working at the church hostel in the Haymarket area. He also performed relief duties for younger ministers who had joined the Australian Army as padres during the Second World War.

In 1945 he was granted leave to complete his history of the Presbyterian Church.

White died of a heart attack at his home in Mowbray Road, Chatswood. A memorial service was held at St Andrews Church, Chatswood, and his remains were cremated at the Northern Suburbs Crematorium.

== Publications ==
- White, Charles Alfred (1951) Challenge of the Years: A History of the Presbyterian Church in Australia. Angus & Robertson.

The book includes a list of ministers and missionaries covering the first 150 years of the church in Australia.

== Family ==
White was a brother of Ada Emily White; Clara Ann Margaret White; Emily Elizabeth White; and Jessie Maria White.

No record of marriage or children has been found.
