= Chinese Methodist Church in Australia =

Chinese-Australian church

The Chinese Methodist Church in Australia is based in Melbourne.

The theology of the Church is in line with Methodism worldwide. It is Wesleyan in theology and its liturgy contains both traditional and contemporary services.

== History ==
The Church was started by members from the Methodist Churches of Malaysia and Singapore who were either sent to Australia or emigrated there. The first congregation was set up in Melbourne in 1986 by Rev James Ha, a missionary of the Sarawak Chinese Annual Conference.

It was originally known as the Methodist Church in Australia but disagreement rose over its name with the Uniting Church in Australia, with the latter refusing to allow its entry into the World Methodist Council. To solve this disagreement, the name was changed to the Chinese Methodist Church in Australia in 2002. After the Uniting Church in Australia dropped its veto, it was subsequently welcomed into the World Methodist Council.

== Bishops ==
The first bishop was the Reverend, Dr. James Ha, who was elected to office on 28 November 2002, when the Annual Conference was officially formed. The second bishop was the Reverend, Dr. Albert Chiew, who was elected to the office on 28 November 2006. On 25 November 2010, the Reverend Dr. James Kwang was elected as the third bishop; he was re-elected on 27 November 2014. On the 23 November 2018, Rev. Dr. Albert Wong was elected as the fourth bishop. The outgoing bishop after serving two terms step aside for the election of the new bishop. Bishop Dr. James Kwang was conferred bishop emeritus by the Annual Conference on the same day. On 24 November 2022, the Annual Conference elected their fifth bishop, Reverend Milton Nee was elected to serve the new term from 2023 to 2026.

== Territories ==
In 2023, CMCA had 25 churches in most Australian territories (there are none in the Northern Territories); it also oversees some mission work in Papua New Guinea and the Solomon Islands.

The denomination created an English-language publication called Connect in 2019.

== Affiliations ==
- National Council of Churches in Australia
- World Methodist Council
- World Federation of Chinese Methodist Churches
