= T. E. Rofe =

Thomas Ernest Rofe (15 June 1869 – 16 May 1945) was a solicitor in Sydney, New South Wales, who was struck off the roll in 1896, later described as accountant and company manager. He was prominent in the history of the Churches of Christ in New South Wales.

== History ==
Rofe was born a son of Alfred Rofe, solicitor with the firm of Alfred Rofe and Sons of Castlereagh Street, Sydney, who died on 9 July 1902, leaving an estate worth £187,409. He had appointed his three married sons as executors and trustees of his estate. Rofe was personally involved in several legal disputes, one of which caused him to be struck off the roll:

=== Butler divorce case ===
In 1895 the "snobbish, flashy pharmacist" Thomas Richard Butler sued his wife Mary Jane Butler, née Johnson, for divorce, on the grounds of adultery with one George Williams; Rofe was Butler's solicitor. The case was straightforward and Butler got his decree nisi on 14 November 1894; Mary's brother John F. Johnson, who had falsely testified to Butler's adultery in a vain attempt to help his sister, was convicted of perjury and sentenced to three years' imprisonment. All was not as it seemed however. Mary Butler discovered George Williams was actually Charles Davis, a private detective hired by Butler; the two fabricated a trail of evidence designed to incriminate her. Rofe denied involvement in the entrapment, but was found guilty. He was saved from jail by the First Offenders' Act, but was barred from sitting in the Supreme Court. Sydney Truth was not impressed; it seemed like "one law for the rich and distinguished, another for the poor." Rofe applied for reinstatement, unsuccessfully, in 1901 and 1906.

=== Rofe vs Rofe ===
Sometime before 1900, his brother A. C. Rofe received £4,650 for development of his business from his father, which J. F. Rofe and T. E. Rofe believed was a loan but A. C. Rofe claimed was a gift. The matter, described as a friendly action, was settled but the terms were not disclosed.

=== Church of Christ ===
Rofe joined the Hornsby Church of Christ in 1910 and in 1912 was a NSW delegate to the Churches of Christ federal conference in Melbourne and laid the foundation stone of the Mosman church in 1914. He was State president in the years 1923–1924 and 1935 and federal president in 1940. He was a Churches of Christ delegate to the Council of Churches in New South Wales and its president in 1933. He was a prominent donor to the church and to hospital charities.

=== Rofe vs Smith's Weekly ===
The Butler case was revisited nearly 30 years later, when Smith's Weekly published an article about Rofe, alleging that his recently publicized charitable donations were mostly in valueless shares, and were aimed at restoring his position on the roll of attorneys. (Note: An earlier article, adds context, naming attorney-general David R. Hall as a Rofe associate.) In November 1923 Rofe's lawyer D. R. Hall issued a Supreme Court writ for libel against the newspaper company, claiming £25,000 damages. The action, conducted by W. A. Holman and Selwyn Betts (died 14 October 1938), and defended by Reginald Long-Innes KC (died 26 May 1947), Andrew Robert James Watt KC (died 8 December 1950) and Dr H. V. Evatt KC, before Justice Gordon and a 12-member jury. The jury found for Smith's, who relied on a defence of truth and public interest. Rofe filed an appeal.

== Recognition and last days ==
- On 15 June 1933 Rofe was re-admitted as a solicitor, and re-affixed his brass plate to the house on Castlereagh Street, Redfern, which had been his business premises 38 years earlier. On 18 May 1939 he was admitted to the Bar.
- He received medals commemorating the jubilee of George V's coronation and of George VI's coronation.

Rofe died at the family home, "Neringla" on Woonona-avenue, Wahroonga. His remains were cremated.

== Family ==
Alfred Rofe (c. 1841 – 9 July 1902) married Sarah Fulton on 14 June 1860

- John Fulton Rofe, M.A. (c. 1863 – 30 November 1931) married Rose Annie Isabella Davies ( – ) on 30 April 1890.
- Arthur Camden Rofe (c. 1867 – 7 December 1933) married Ethel Dugdale ( – ) on 26 June 1889.
- Thomas Ernest Rofe (c. 1869 – 16 May 1945) married Minnie Edith Hilder ( – ) on 27 December 1893.

- Thomas Fulton Gladstone Rofe (born 19 January 1899)
- Minnie Edith Rofe (died December 1922) married O(swald) Weldon Andrews on 7 October 1920

- Percy George Nathaniel Rofe (1874–1953) married Olive Eaton in 1907
- Ethel Stewart Rofe married Rev. A. M. Ogilvie on 9 April 1910
- Elsie Louise Mildred Rofe married S. F. Newlands on
