= Andrew Watts =

Andrew Watts may refer to:

- Andrew Watts (cricketer) (born 1960), English cricketer
- Andrew Watts (countertenor) (born 1967), British classical countertenor
- Andy Watts, drummer with The Seahorses

== See also ==
- Andrew Watt (disambiguation)
