= Western Australian Council of Churches =

The Western Australian Council of Churches was a body of leaders from the evangelical Christian churches of the Australian state of Western Australia. It was formed to present a unified front to influence public discourse and government policy, and also served to increase communication and cooperation between rival churches with similar aims and philosophies. This article traces the history of the council through a list of its presidents and, to a lesser extent, its secretaries, who through being eligible for reelection, provided stability and continuity of service.

== History ==
Following the visit in August 1901 of Rev. J. G. Greenhough, President of the National Council of the Evangelical Free Churches of Great Britain and Ireland, a Western Australian Council of Churches was formed, but was pronounced ineffective.

- 1902 William T. Kench (Congregational)
- 1903 Dr Fitchett
- 1905, 1906 Thomas Bird
- 1907 A. S. Wilson (Baptist)

T. Bird was secretary

- 1908–1909 W. T. Kench (Congregational)
- 1910–1911 A. S. C. James
- 1912 Tom Allan (Methodist)
- 1913 Brian Wibberley (Methodist)
- 1914 W. B. Blakemore
- 1915, 1916 J. H. Prowse

Mason was secretary

- 1917 F. E. Harry (Baptist) died in NZ 1930
- 1918 W. Huey Steele (Presbyterian)
- 1919 Brian Wibberley
- 1920 W. H. Prowse?
- 1920 G. A. Williamson Legge
- 1921 J. W. Grove
- 1922 Thomas Hagger
- 1923 Harry Reeve (Baptist)
- 1924 Ensign J. R. Dusting (Salvation Army)
- 1925 George Tulloch (Presbyterian)

H. H. Symons secretary

- 1926, 1927 John W. Grove
- 1927 G. W. Tulloch ?

Presbyterian church withdraws from Council 1928 It is likely the Council of Churches of WA went into recess around this time, as the newspapers ceased reporting on their activities.
