= Francis Bertie Boyce =

Australian priest (1844–1931)

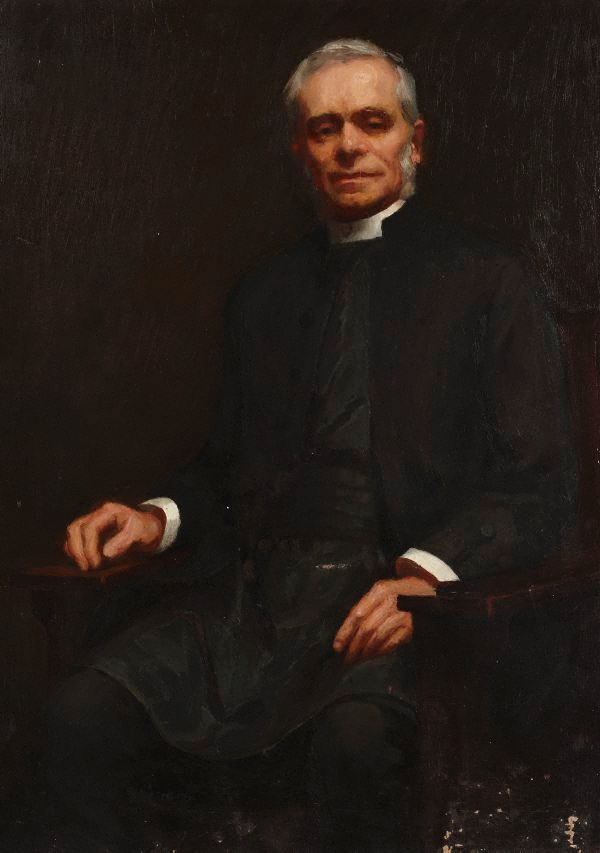

President of the Council of Churches in New South Wales
- In office 1926

Personal details
- Born: 6 April 1844 Tiverton, Devon, England
- Died: 27 May 1931 (aged 87) Blackheath, New South Wales
- Occupation: clergyman

Francis Bertie Boyce (6 April 1844 – 27 May 1931), commonly referred to as Archdeacon Boyce, was an Australian clergyman and social reformer. A supporter of inter-church dialogue, in 1926 he was elected president of the recently formed Council of Churches in New South Wales.

== Honours ==
Mount Boyce is named in honour of Venerable Archdeacon Boyce.

Memorials to Boyce were placed in the Sydney and Bathurst cathedrals and his portrait by Julian Ashton was presented to the National Art Gallery of New South Wales in 1917. His memoirs were published posthumously in 1934 as Four-Score Years and Seven.
