= Greenhough =

Greenhough is a surname. Notable people with the surname include:

- Bobby Greenhough (1939- ) (actually Bobby Greenough), English rugby league footballer of the 1950s and 1960s
- Dorothy Greenhough-Smith (1882–1965), British figure skater
- Herbert Greenhough Smith (1855–1935), the first editor of The Strand magazine
- Tommy Greenhough (1931–2009), Lancashire and England cricketer
- George Bellas Greenough (1778-1855) (spelt Greenhough on an 1827 print of his villa in Regents Park), pioneering English geologist

== See also ==
- Greenhoff
