= A. J. Waldock =

Arthur John Waldock (6 June 1872 – 1 May 1961), generally known as A. J. Waldock was a Baptist minister in Australia, best known for establishing the denomination in Canberra.

== History ==
Waldock was born in Kew, Victoria, son of John Waldock, a Congregationalist minister, and Mary Hannah Waldock, later Renouf (died 1930), and educated in New South Wales.

Waldock was inducted as minister of the Baptist Union around 1894. He served as assistant pastor in Bathurst from 1892 to 1896, and was ordained in 1897 in the Bathurst Street church. He was first stationed at Hinton, then for nine or ten years at Auburn. He was president of the NSW Baptist College from its inauguration around 1915. He was secretary of the Baptist Home Mission in 1905 and served as superintendent of the Baptist Union of New South Wales from 1908 to 1924, responsible for training young men as ministers, and overseeing their deployment. He was president of the Union in 1918 and 1919. His resignation was in response to "certain elements", not named, which were creating internal dissension.

In 1921, Waldock was appointed by the New South Wales Union as their delegate to the 1922 Baptist World Alliance congress, held in Paris. He was pastor of the Mosman church 1924–1929. In 1928, he was elected president of the Council of Churches in New South Wales.

In 1928, Waldock established Canberra's first Baptist church in the suburb of Kingston, and accepted the invitation to become its first minister. His sermons were published weekly in the Canberra Times. He retired in 1948.

He was a member of Australian National University convocation, and a councillor of Canberra University College. He helped establish a business school for girls.

== Recognition ==
In 1923, Waldock was made honorary Doctor of Divinity by Georgetown College of Kentucky, U.S.A.

On 3 September 1950 Waldock's work was celebrated with a memorial window, depicting St Paul and Timothy, in Canberra Baptist Church. The A. J. Waldock Memorial Hall at the church was opened on 14 April 1962.

== Personal life ==
Waldock married Charlotte Godfrey, daughter of John and Martha Godfrey of Bathurst, at Raglan, New South Wales, on 28 October 1896. Godfrey was a Sunday School teacher and Christian Endeavor leader. Wadlock was then pastor of the church at Hinton, New South Wales. They had one son, Arthur John Alfred Waldock a professor at Sydney University, He never married. and a daughter (Ada) Nellie.
