= Arthur John Alfred Waldock =

Australian academic (1898–1950)

Arthur John Alfred Waldock (26 January 1898 – 14 January 1950), generally referred to as A. J. A. Waldock, was an Australian academic, professor of English Literature at Sydney University.

== History ==
Waldock was born in Hinton, New South Wales, the only son of Charlotte Waldock, née Godfrey, and Arthur John Waldock, Baptist minister.

He was educated at Sydney High School and the University of Sydney, graduating BA, with first-class honours in English literature and history, in 1918. He briefly taught English Literature at the Sydney Church of England Grammar School (Shore).

He was appointed instructor at the Royal Australian Naval College at Jervis Bay on 1 October 1918, resigned 31 March 1919, acknowledging cardiac problems.

In 1919 he became a lecturer in English at Sydney University, and gained his MA in 1925.

In 1934 he succeeded John Le Gay Brereton as professor of English Literature in the Chair of English Literature. Both Brereton and Waldock had been students of Professor Sir Mungo William MacCallum.

== Last days ==
Waldock was visiting his father in Canberra when he fell ill, and returned to Sydney, where he was admitted to St Luke's hospital on 10 January 1950. He died following surgery. His remains were interred at the Northern Suburbs Cemetery.

== Publications ==
- Thomas Hardy and the Dynasts
- Hamlet: A Study in Critical Method (Cambridge, 1931)

– "The wisest criticism of Hamlet that has yet appeared" – John Dover Wilson

- James Joyce and Others (London, 1937)
- Studies of English Writers
- Paradise Lost and Its Critics (Cambridge, 1947)
- Sophocles the Dramatist (Cambridge, 1951)
