= Andrew Watt (meteorologist) =

British meteorologist

Andrew Watt FRSE (1869–1929) was a 19th/20th-century meteorologist who worked in and helped to develop the Scottish Meteorological Society and the Royal Meteorological Society.

== Life ==
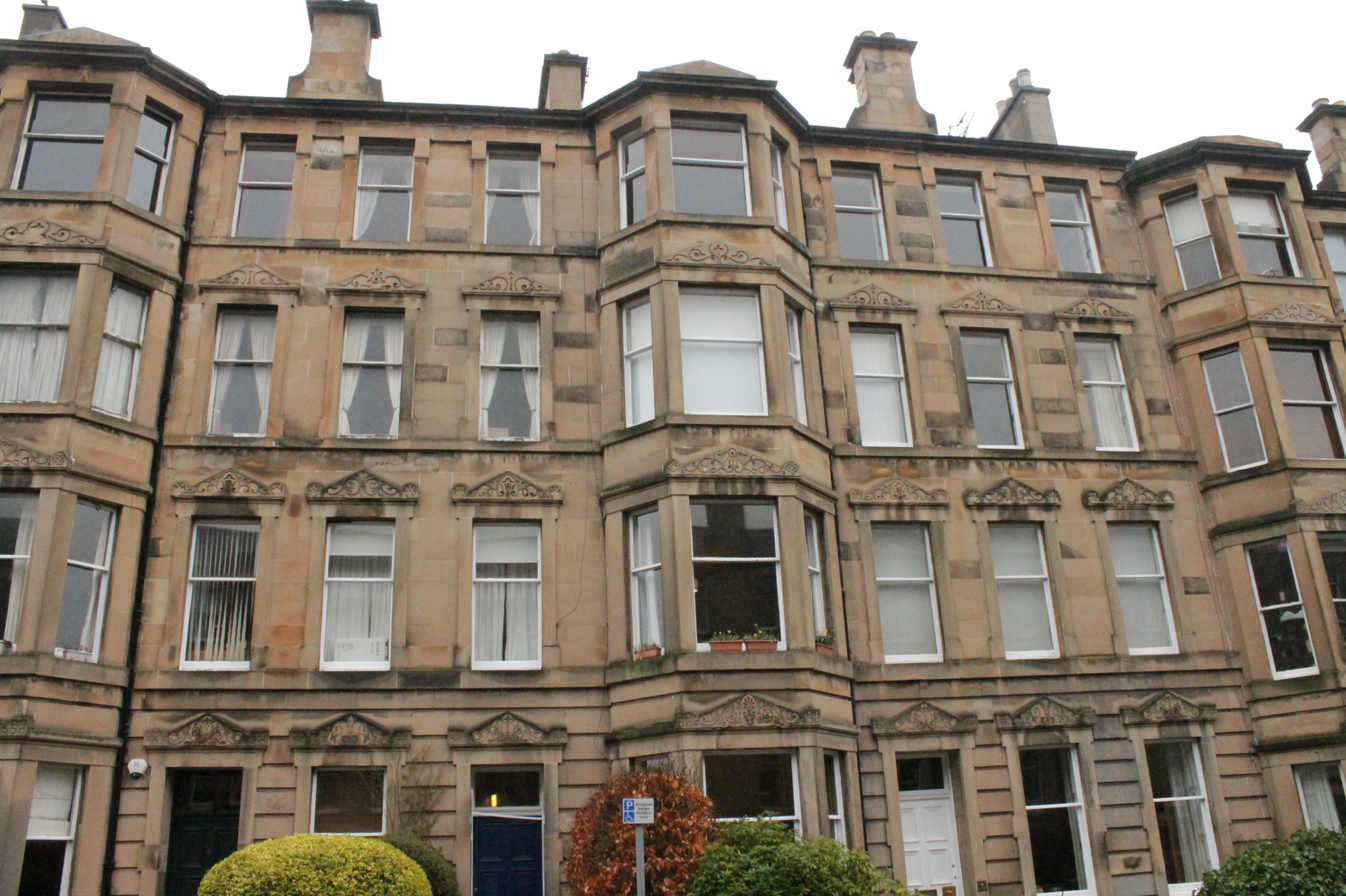
6 Woodburn Terrace, Edinburgh

He was born in Edinburgh in 1869. His family left Edinburgh in his youth and went to Dumfriesshire where he was educated at Dumfries Academy. He returned to Edinburgh to study mathematics at the University of Edinburgh graduating in 1889.

He moved to Australia (partly on health grounds) where he obtained a post teaching mathematics at the Scots' College, Melbourne. In 1894 he returned to Britain and continued as a maths teacher until 1900 when he joined the staff of the Scottish Meteorological Society as assistant to Dr Alexander Buchan. In 1905 he replaced Miss Jessie Buchan as Secretary to the Society and in 1907 he replaced Dr Buchan as Director of the Society. The Society was based at 122 George Street in Edinburgh.

In 1907 he was elected a Fellow of the Royal Society of Edinburgh. His proposers were Sir Arthur Mitchell, Alexander Buchan, Robert Traill Omond and Cargill Gilston Knott.

He lived at 6 Woodburn Terrace in Edinburgh, a flat in the Morningside district.

In 1920 the Society was amalgamated with the Royal Meteorological Society. In 1925 he was based at 10 Rothesay Place.

He died on 9 January 1929 aged 59.

== Family ==
He was married to Winifred Attwell (d.1927). He never recovered from her death. They had no children.
