= Tasmanian Council of Churches =

The Tasmanian Council of Churches encompasses various bodies of leaders from the evangelical Christian churches of the Australian colony or state of Tasmania, formed to present a unified front to influence public discourse and government policy, and also served to increase communication and cooperation between rival churches with similar aims and philosophies. This article traces the histories of the major councils of churches in Tasmania through a list of their presidents and to a lesser extent their secretaries, punctuated with notes on turning points in their histories.

== History ==
Two councils ran simultaneously in Tasmania until 1907: the Southern or Hobart council and the Northern or Launceston council. In 1906 a "State" or Tasmanian council was established with two branches, centred on Hobart and Launceston.

=== Southern Tasmanian Council of Churches ===
Sometime around 1890, the ministers of Hobart's non-episcopal churches began holding monthly meetings to discuss matters of common concern. Out of this grew an annual week of discussions which included lay members, held at premises of a different church each evening. This resulted in a Council of Churches, which met on alternate months to the Ministers' Association.

- James Scott (died 17 February 1905) has been cited as first president.
- 1897 G. W. Sharp (Congregational, died March 1920) remained president until 1902.

H. B. Barber secretary

- 1902 James Blaikie (Baptist)

John W. Roberts (Congregational), secretary

- 1904 Henry Worrall

Secretary W. A. Gann

- 1905 G. W. Sharp
- 1906 James Barr

=== Council of Churches of Northern Tasmania ===
(also, initially, "Council of Free Churches", as in Britain)

- 1898 William Law

Henry Jones, secretary

- 1899 Henry Jones
- 1900 A. Madsen
- 1902 J. G. Wright There was no 1901 election, so Madsen was president for 19 months; secretary was Andrew R. Osborn.

This council must have failed, as in March 1906 members of the Congregational Union voted to found a Council of Free Churches, with the Congregational delegates being Revs. Mearns, Massie, A. J. B. Rofe, W. A. Gann, J. G. Wright, G. W. Sharp, and W. Baily. No such council has been found, but . . .

=== State Council of Churches / Tasmanian Council of Churches ===
==== First incarnation, 1906 ====
Constituted 1906 at Ross

- 1906 James Barr (Hobart)
- 1906 Frank Lade (Hobart)

W. Austin Gann was Hobart secretary; H. Bride Barber was Launceston secretary, resigned 1907, succeeded by S. H. Morrison.

- 1907 Frank William Boreham (Hobart)
- 1907 G. W. Sharp (Hobart)
- 1908 William Beck (Presbyterian, Launceston)
- 1909–1910 Robert Philp (Methodist, Launceston)
- 1909 Samuel Clemes (Hobart)

W. Austin Gann was secretary

- 1910 G. W. Sharp (Hobart) his third presidency.

AGM in March 1910 only three Launceston delegates attended so only formal business was transacted. Beck, who had requested that date, did not appear. F. W. Boreham secretary

- 1911 J. Francis Mather
- 1911 Sidney J. Baker (Congregational, Launceston)
- 1912 H. T. Postle (Hobart)
- 1912 F. C. Spurr (Baptist, Launceston)

F. W. Boreham, secretary

- 1913 F. W. Boreham (Hobart) six years as secretary, two as president
- 1913 S. Sharp (Launceston) left for NSW; succeeded by J. W. Holt (aka Wilfred J. Holt, Presbyterian)
- 1914 Joseph Snell (Hobart)
- 1914 William H. Harris (Launceston)
- 1915 W. R. C. Jarvis (Hobart)

H. A. Overend was secretary

- 1915, 1916 C. C. Dugan (Hobart)
- 1917–1919 E. Herbert Hobday

H. G. Secomb was secretary 1917–1919

- 1922 Albert Butler (Baptist)

Donovan F. Mitchell was secretary in 1924

==== Second incarnation, 1925 ====
In 1925 the Tasmanian Council of Churches was established, embracing the whole state with representatives from Methodist, Presbyterian, Baptist, Congregational Churches, Churches of Christ, Society of Friends, and the Salvation Army, with the old Southern Tasmanian Council of Churches functioning as a district council of the State organisation. First president was W. Corly Butler, and secretary Rev. D. F. Mitchell.

- 1925 W. Corly Butler (Methodist) resigned 1926 as he was leaving Tasmania.
- 1926 G. B. Murphy appointed to both councils but died 30 June 1926.
- 1926 A. C. Nelson
- 1927 E. E. Unwin
- 1928 Raymond Farrer
- 1929 Charles Matear

Josiah Park (Church of Christ) was secretary 1929 – c. 1950.

- 1930 G. Calvert Barber (Methodist)
- 1931 Harold J. Ralph
- 1932 H. G. Hackworthy
- 1933 David Lewis
- 1934 W. N. Gunson
- 1935 Ernest E. Unwin
- 1936 L. A. Bowes
- 1937 Norman H. Joughin
- 1938 J. C. Salter
- 1939 F. E. Richards
- 1940 Harold J. Ralph
- 1941 L. A. Bowes
- 1942 E. Roberts-Thomson
- 1943 J. A. Munro-Ford
- 1944 Gordon Arthur
- 1945 F. L. Inglis
- 1946 H. S. Grimwade
- 1947 J. C. Salter
- 1948
- 1949 L. Stranks
- 1950 J. S. Mackie

The Jane Franklin Hall was established by the Council in 1950 as a residential college for women, became co-educational in 1973.

=== Tasmanian Council of Churches ===
In April 1946 a new council of churches was inaugurated at Evandale, Tasmania as a regional committee of the Australian section of the World Council of Churches, the Anglican Bishop G. F. Cranswick being elected president. He was reelected in 1947. Cranswick and Calvert Barber, president of the Methodist Conference, were appointed delegates to the first General Assembly of the WCC at Amsterdam on 22 August 1948, attended by representatives of every major church (with certain exceptions, notably the Roman Catholic).
