= Victor Bell =

Australian Methodist and Presbyterian minister

Victor Clarence Bell (1878 – 4 August 1965) was an Australian Methodist and Presbyterian minister in New South Wales.

== History ==
Bell was born in Grenfell, New South Wales, son of Alison Bell and William James Bell (c. 1857–1916), and was educated at the local public school. He became preacher at the Methodist church, Wyalong, later serving at Lockhart and Gulgong. He conducted the first service at the Hiawatha Wesleyan Church, West Wyalong, in April 1908. After two years' study at Newington College he served as minister at Murwillumbah, Camden, Lindfield, and Quirindi. He left the Methodist church for the Presbyterians in 1917, and was stationed at Greenwich. He transferred to St Enoch's, Newtown, in 1921, then accepted a call to call to St Paul's Church, Invercargill, New Zealand in 1925, but the Newtown church refused to release him, an unusual circumstance.

He supported inter-faith dialogue and served as secretary to the Council of Churches in New South Wales from 1926 to 1929, when he was elected president.

He was elected moderator of the Sydney Presbytery in January 1927, and inducted into the Strathfield Presbyterian charge in June 1927.

In 1933 he graduated M.A. from Sydney University consequent on publication of his thesis on Personality in the New Testament.

He qualified Doctor of Divinity at the Presbyterian College, McGill University, Montreal, Canada, with the publication of his Religion and Reality in, the Light of the Christian Soul in 1935.

In 1940 he was unanimously appointed State Moderator for NSW for the following year.

== Some insights ==
In 1908 he rattled a few bars when he first omitted the word "obey" from the marriage ceremony. He justified this variation 20 years later:

I left 'obey' out of the marriage ceremony because I believed that, if the partners sincerely loved each other, their love would guarantee all the obedience that was needed. But I do not like the word at all. Obedience conveys the idea of authority on the one side and submission on the other. In business circles, military systems, education, and other spheres, it is quite necessary — but what gives a man authority over a woman whom he asks to be his wife?

After countless burials, he officiated at his first cremation in 1928, and was immediately converted to this more hygienic method of disposing of human remains which, he observed, was also less distressing to the relatives.

He was a firm supporter of women in all fields of activity — but not, as in Russia and Japan – as coalers and farm workers.

== Criticism ==
The Catholic Church and its approval of games of chance for fundraising were particular targets of Bell's sermons while, according to his critics, turning a blind eye to greater evils.

== Family ==
Bell married Lucy May "Maisie" Heard (died 1959) on 23 March 1910. They had one son, Leonard Stewart Bell BA LLB (1922–1968). In 1948 he won Rotary International's Paul Harris Memorial Fellowship, which he used to fund a year's tuition at Harvard University. He was the first Australian so honoured.

In 1928 they had a home at Elsie Street, Homebush.
