= C. Bernard Cockett =

Australian Congregationalist minister (1888–1965)

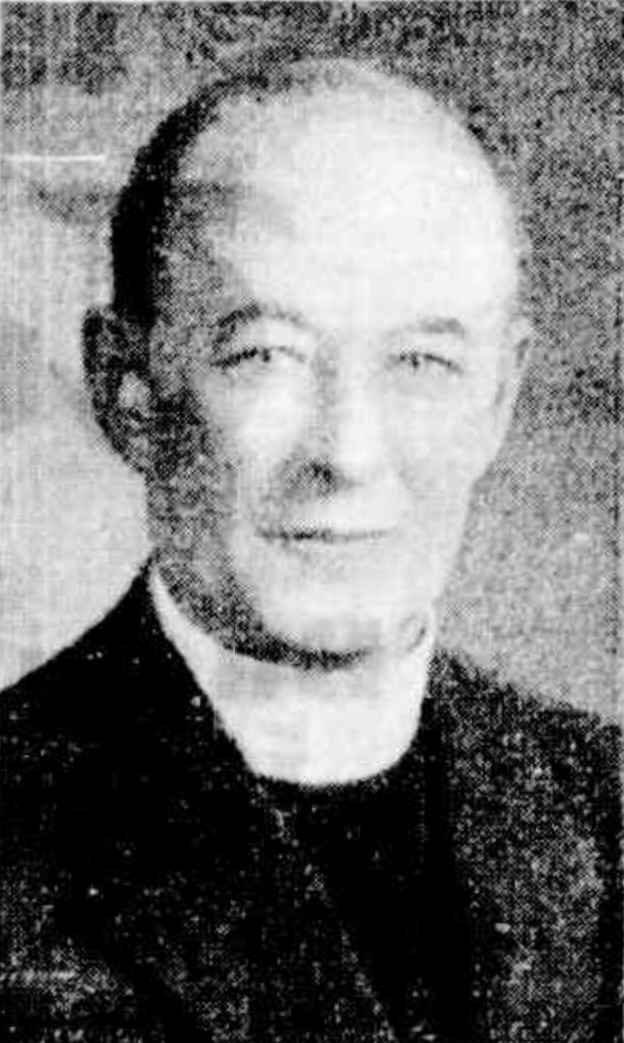
C. Bernard Cockett in 1939

Charles Bernard Cockett (24 February 1888 – 24 November 1965) was a Congregational churchman, for many years minister of the Pitt Street Congregational Church and represented the Australian church at the World Council of Churches.

== History ==
Cockett was born in Sydney, the elder son of Frank Cockett, of "Hunting Tower," Rockdale, and Rebecca Cockett (died 1907), née Bowles. He was educated at Fort Street Model Public School and Sydney University, studying theology at Camden College, where he was highly successful student, awarded Lithgow Scholar in Logic and Mental Philosophy. and member of the University Amateur Athletic Club, for whom he won the State one mile walking championship. He was a student pastor at the Congregational church, Willoughby from April 1914 to July, when he received a call to supply the Rockhampton, Queensland, church for a month, which extended through to December, when he returned to his studies. In 1915 he accepted a call to return to Rockhampton.

In 1917 he accepted a call to the Wyclif Congregational Church, Surrey Hills, Victoria, near Melbourne. He quickly became assimilated in Surrey Hills society and was elected president of their literary and debating society.

Lauded as "a young man for whom great success is predicted", he was guest preacher at Trinity Church, Perth, in January 1919. He was next attached to Hobart's Memorial Congregational Church (Elizabeth Street corner of Brisbane Street) for a few years.

=== In England ===
In 1925 he accepted a call to the Bunyan Meeting, associated with the John Bunyan Museum in Bedford, England. In 1931 he transferred to the Vine Memorial Church, Ilford, London. While in England he gave lectures to prospective migrants on behalf of the Central Office of Information.

=== Return to Australia ===
In 1939 he returned to Australia as replacement for T. E. Ruth, minister of the Pitt Street Congregational Church.

During World War II, Cockett protested against Sunday entertainment for the troops. He favored compulsory exchange of "medical credentials" prior to marriage.

In 1946 he returned to England, where he lectured for the Colonial Missionary Society, recruiting ministers for Australian pulpits, and for several years was minister of the Chapel-in-the-Fields, in Norwich. In 1952 he left for Perth, where he was inducted as a minister and secretary of the Congregational Union of Western Australia. He served as minister in England once again, at Haslemere, Surrey, 1955–1959, then returned to Melbourne, where he died.

Cockett was:

- convenor of the Social Purity and Sex Education Department of the Victorian Council of Churches
- chairman, Tasmanian Congregational Union 1921–1922
- president, New South Wales Council of Churches for year 1941–1942
- president of the Congregational Union of Australia and New Zealand from 1941 to 1946.
- an Australian representative at the inaugural meeting of the World Council of Churches in Amsterdam in 1948.
- secretary, Congregational Union of Western Australia 1952–1954.

He has been credited with founding the Australian Council for the World Council of Churches, as well as being its first secretary.

== Family ==
On 23 March 1915 Cockett married Florence Champion (died 19 January 1951), daughter of Alfred Champion of Camberwell, Victoria. Their children included:

- Audrey Cockett was a dentistry graduate of Sydney University. She married Max Pearce on 12 April 1945.
- F(rank) Bernard Cockett B.Sc., M.R.C.S., L.R.C.P., M.B., B.S. (1917– ) was born in Rockhampton. He worked at St Thomas's Hospital in London during WWII.

Cockett married again on 29 September 1952 to Grace Edna Beal, of Perth.
