= Sydney Sparkes Orr =

British philosopher (1914-1966)

Sydney Sparkes Orr (6 December 1914 – 15 July 1966) was Professor of Philosophy at the University of Tasmania and the centre of the "Orr case", a celebrated academic scandal of the 1950s.

Born in Belfast in 1914, Orr achieved a first-class-honours BA in Philosophy and received an MA with special commendation at Queen's University before commencing his teaching career at the University of St Andrews and the University of Melbourne. In 1952 he was appointed to the chair of philosophy at the University of Tasmania, after falsifying his academic record in his application.

In 1955 the University dismissed him for sexual relations with an undergraduate student. He denied the accusation but his appeals to the Tasmanian Supreme Court and the High Court of Australia were unsuccessful. Many academics believed Orr had been denied due process and his position was declared "black". Many also thought that Orr had been made a scapegoat due to his openly challenging the University authorities.

Orr died of pulmonary emboli in 1966, shortly after reaching a monetary settlement with the university of A$32,000.
