= Margaret Holmes (ecumenist) =

Australian community worker, refugee resettlement officer

Margaret Holmes MBE
- Born: 8 March 1886; Prahan, Victoria, Australia
- Died: 13 April 1981 (aged 95); Brighton, Victoria, Australia
- Occupations: Ecumenist, NGO leader
- Known for: Refugee resettlement, leadership in ASCM

Margaret Holmes MBE (1886 – 1981) was an Australian community worker specialising in refugee resettlement and program management for faith-based organisations. She ran the headquarters for the Australian Student Christian Movement from 1924 to 1945. During World War II, she helped establish the Victorian International Refugee Emergency Committee. From 1951 to 1962, she led the refugee resettlement program of the Australian Council of Churches. In recognition of her work with refugees and migrants, she was appointed MBE in 1958.

== Early life and education ==
Margaret Holmes was born on 8 March 1886 in Prahran, Victoria, a suburb of Melbourne. Her father, Charles Morell Holmes, worked as an accountant. Her mother, Margaret, née Byers, was a homemaker. Margaret was their fourth surviving child and their only daughter. She attended the University of Melbourne and completed her Bachelor of Arts in classics in 1909. She taught briefly and then returned to the University of Melbourne to study for a Diploma in Education and a Master of Arts, which she received in 1911.

== Career ==
Holmes was an influential leader in the Australasian Student Christian Union, later known as the Australia Student Christian Movement (ASCM). She joined the organisation as a student, first at grammar school and later at university where she became the president of the Women's Union. During the first World War, she became the organisation's part-time general secretary. In 1921, she became the secretary for secondary school work, a newly created post. She left this post to work for the Associated Teachers’ Training Institute from 1922 to 1924, but she soon returned to ASCM.

Holmes took up the role of headquarters secretary, making her the organisation's executive officer, in 1924. Four years later she was elected to the executive of the World Student Christian Federation. In 1929 she travelled to India as one of three delegates representing ASCM at the WSCF's biannual meeting. Holmes also traveled to Java in 1933, to attend a regional conference of the WSCF, where she presented a talk. She became vice-chairman of the WCSF that year, and served in this role until 1941.

As headquarters secretary, Holmes was known for her skill at organising conferences, including the ASCM's large scale national conferences that drew students from across the country. She helped with the preparation of study books prepared for these national conferences, drawing on liberal ecumenical Protestant theology. She also co-edited ASCM's Australian Intercollegian journal.

After the start of World War II, Holmes became active in refugee resettlement work, addressing the needs of war refugees arriving in Australia. In 1938, she helped establish the Victorian International Refugee Emergency Committee. Along with this work, Holmes continued as ACSM headquarters secretary until 1945. After leaving her post, she spent a year travelling abroad in 1949.

By 1951, Holmes had returned to Australia, where she became the refugee resettlement officer for the Australia Council of Churches. In this role, she worked closely with the World Council of Churches' resettlement program, arranging support for new arrivals to Australia and assisting with family reunification. In 1950, the first year of the program, the program resettled 72 refugees. By 1955, the program had assisted 2800 people. Holmes primarily worked in Victoria, South Australia and Western Australia; a second resettlement officer was hired in 1952 to lead efforts in New South Wales, Queensland, and the Northern Territories. On 1 January 1958, as part of the 1958 New Year's Honours, Holmes was appointed a member of the Order of the British Empire, for "service to refugees and post war migrants."

Holmes retired in 1962 and moved from her Kew home to Deepdene, Victoria. She died on 13 April 1981 in Brighton.
