= Frank Greenhoff =

English footballer

Personal information
- Date of birth: 3 March 1924
- Place of birth: Barnsley, England
- Date of death: February 1999
- Place of death: Surrey, England
- Position: Winger

Youth career
- –: Manchester City
- –: Barnsley

Senior career*
Years	Team	Apps	(Gls)
1948–1952	Bradford City	81	(11)
1952–19xx	Worksop Town	?	(?)
Total		?	(?)
- * Club domestic league appearances and goals

Frank Greenhoff (3 March 1924 – August 1999) was an English professional footballer who played as a winger. Born in Barnsley, he played for his hometown club, Barnsley Football Club before joining Bradford City in 1948. He made 81 appearances in the English Football League for Bradford City, before moving to Worksop Town in July 1952.
