= National Council of Churches in Australia =

Christian ecumenical group

- Founded: 1994
- Website: ncca.org.au

The National Council of Churches in Australia (NCCA) is an ecumenical organisation bringing together a number of Australia's Christian churches in dialogue and practical cooperation.

The NCCA works in collaboration with state ecumenical councils around Australia. It is an associate council of the World Council of Churches, a member of the Christian Conference of Asia and a partner of other national ecumenical bodies throughout the world. "Act for Peace" is the international aid agency of the NCCA, which aims to empower war-torn communities to protect refugees, reduce poverty, prevent conflicts and manage disasters.

== Background ==
The modern ecumenical movement began to take shape at the end of the 19th century. Initiatives among students and between church mission agencies led the way. In Australia these included the Australian Student Christian Movement, formed in 1896, and the National Missionary Council, created in 1926.

Organised ecumenism in Australia at the national church level was first formalised through the Australian Committee for the World Council of Churches (1946). This movement initially involved only the Anglican and Mainline Protestant churches. In the 1960s and '70s, however, Eastern and Oriental Orthodox churches joined the ecumenical movement. This developed into the Australian Council of Churches (ACC). Following the Second Vatican Council, the Roman Catholic Church in Australia began exploring possibilities for relationships with other churches. In 1994 the National Council of Churches in Australia (NCCA) succeeded the ACC, with the Catholic Church as a member.

== Logo ==
The symbol of the boat has long been used to represent the ecumenical movement, and its origins are unclear - perhaps in the Gospel story of the calling of the Galilean fishermen to be disciples - "fishers of men". The boat represents the Christian Church as a ship sailing the sea that is the world. The mast, in the shape of the cross, recalls the Christian faith.

The NCCA's version of the boat includes waves and the Southern Cross and was adopted at the formation of the NCCA in 1994. The use of the Southern Cross identifies the NCCA's geographical location.

An updated version of the logo, pictured above, was adopted in 2006.

== Member churches ==
The NCCA currently comprises 18 member churches:

Member Church	Head of Church
Anglican Church of Australia	Archbishop Geoffrey Smith
Antiochian Orthodox Church	Archbishop Basilios Kodseie
Armenian Apostolic Church	Archbishop Haigazoun Najarian
Assyrian Church of the East	Archbishop Mar Meelis Zaia
Catholic Church	Archbishop Timothy Costelloe
Chinese Methodist Church in Australia	Bishop Puong Kiong (Milton) Nee
Churches of Christ in Australia	Rev Dr. Rob Nyhuis
Congregational Federation of Australia	Miriama Laumea
Coptic Orthodox Church	Bishop Daniel and V. Rev. Fr Daniel Ghabrial
Greek Orthodox Church	Archbishop Makarios Griniezakis
Indian Orthodox Church	Bishop Yuhanon Mar Diascoros
Lutheran Church of Australia	Bishop Paul Smith
Mar Thoma Church	Rt. Rev. Dr. Mathews Mar Makarios Episcopa
Religious Society of Friends (Quakers)	Bruce Henry
Romanian Orthodox Church	Bishop Mihail (Filimon)
Syriac Orthodox Church	Archbishop Mor Malatius Malki Malki
The Salvation Army	Commissioner Miriam Gluyas
Uniting Church in Australia	Rev Charissa Suli

=== Presidents ===
2022 - present	The Revd John Gilmore	Churches of Christ
2016 – 2022	Bishop Philip Huggins	Anglican Church
2013 – 2016	The Revd Mike Semmler	Lutheran Church of Australia
2009 - 2013	Bishop Michael Putney	Catholic Church
2006 - 2009	Bishop Richard Appleby	Anglican Church
2003 - 2006	The Revd James Haire	Uniting Church in Australia
1999 - 2001	The Revd Lance Steicke	Lutheran Church
1997 - 1999	Archbishop John Bathersby	Catholic Church
1994 - 1997	Archbishop Aghan Baliozian	Armenian Apostolic Church

=== General secretaries ===
Year	Name
2020–present	Liz Stone
2015–2018	Sr Elizabeth Delaney SGS
2009 - 2014	Tara Curlewis
2001 - 2009	John Henderson
1994 - 2001	David Gill

Source: National Council of Churches in Australia website

== See also ==
- Christianity in Australia
- Margaret Holmes (ecumenist)
