= F. H. Rayward =

Frank Harrison Raward (8 September 1891 – 24 December 1993), from 1931 spelled Rayward, was a Methodist minister in Australia.

== History ==
Rayward was born in Bowral, to Frank Ralph Raward (c. 1855 – 31 May 1934) and Emma Clara Raward (c. 1860? 1866? – 12 October 1936), née Harrison (married 1883). and from age 12 to 16 lived in Dunoon, New South Wales, where his parents ran a dairy farm.

In 1914 he was accepted for the ministry and sent to the Methodist Theological College at Newington (Stanmore), and was accepted as a candidate for the Methodist ministry in the Lismore circuit. He served as a probationer at Narromine in 1917, and was elected reporting secretary (for the local press) of the Goulburn district. He was ordained in 1918, in which year he was given in charge of the Cooma circuit, followed by Boggabri in 1919 and Wilcannia in 1920. He was appointed to the Sydney Mission in 1921, as assistant to S. J. Hoban, the renowned preacher. He was praised for his conduct of the "Pleasant Sunday Afternoons" services. After six years he was given six months' leave, which he used to tour Europe and America

In 1927 Frank Harrison Raward was registered (4653) as a marriage celebrant. Around this time he was attached to the Methodist Church at Manly. He had been concerned with difficulty found by many in pronouncing his surname, and in 1931 changed its spelling by deed poll to "Rayward". He then had his registration (4653) as a marriage celebrant refreshed as "Frank Harrison Rayward".

Around this time he was appointed to the Newcastle Methodist Mission. Through the depths of the Great Depression, he managed and expanded the Centre's evangelistic, fundraising and life-supporting programs. His preaching received particular praise, as "one of the greatest pulpit personalities in the Australian Protestant clergy". In 1936 he was given six months' leave, which he used to tour China, Japan and the islands of South-east Asia. His impressions were the subject of radio broadcasts and newspaper articles.

In 1938 Rayward was made a Justice of the Peace. That same year, as a result of the success he achieved in Newcastle, he was called to the Central Methodist Mission, preaching in the Lyceum Theatre, where he attracted large numbers of worshippers. In 1951 he was elected president of the Methodist Church in New South Wales.

He was registered as a chaplain to the Royal Australian Navy Reserve, discharged 1959.

== Recognition ==
Rayward was invested with the Order of the British Empire in the New Year's list, 1951.

== Family ==
Frank Harrison Raward married Elsie Barrett, daughter of William Barrett, and his wife Elsie Barrett (died 22 March 1940) who had a home "Tully Nessle", 22 William Street, Earlwood.

- Evelyn Estelle Raward (10 May 1922 – 9 March 1923)
- Frank Lindsay Barrett Rayward (born 13 April 1924)

they had a home "Valhalla", on Bromborough Road, Roseville; later 16 Corona Avenue, Roseville.

Cecil Arthur Raward and Alfred Ralph Raward ( – 14 January 1948) were brothers of Rev. Raward.
