= Cape Murdoch =

Cape on Laurie Island, Antarctica

- Cape
- Coordinates: 60°48′S 44°41′W

Cape Murdoch is a cape which forms the southeast tip of Mossman Peninsula on the south coast of Laurie Island, in the South Orkney Islands.

Charted in 1903 by the Scottish National Antarctic Expedition under Bruce, who named it after William Gordon Burn Murdoch, Scottish artist on the Balaena, one of the Dundee whaling ships in the Antarctic in 1892–93, and a supporter of Bruce's expedition.
