= Andrew Robert James Watt =

Australian barrister

Andrew Robert James Watt KC (c. 1872 – 8 December 1950), often referred to as A. J. Watt was a barrister in Sydney, Australia..

== History ==
Watt was born in Newcastle, New South Wales, a son of Alexander Watt (10 May 1830 – 7 July 1904)

Alexander Watt, a carpenter by trade, but better known as a publican, was born in Ireland and came to Australia with his parents at the age of three.

He was educated at St. Joseph's College, Hunter's Hill, and graduated BA and LLB (with honours) from Sydney University, a Fellow of St John's College. He was called to the Bar in October 1894, and subsequently had a busy and varied practice, mostly concerned with industrial arbitration, appearing with J. L. Campbell, KC.

He frequently appeared with Justice O'Connor and Sir William Cullen CJ, at the arbitration court before the tribunal of Mr Justice Cohen, W. D. Cruickshank (employers' representative), and Sam Smith (unionist).

In November 1916 he was appointed District Court judge and chairman of Quarter Sessions for the north western circuit.

He developed a reputation as an indominable fighter, tenaciously fighting for his client when all seemed lost. While appearing before Justice Stephen and jury in a case between R. W. Miller and the AGL Company, he spoke for 71 hours, reckoned a record.

He retired around 1948 and died at his home on Roker Street, Cronulla in 1950, aged 78.

== Other interests ==
For many years he was vice-president of the Cronulla Surf Club.

== Family ==
Watt had a brother, Bon Watt, and two sisters, Marie and May.

Watt married Ellen Victoria ???? They had eight daughters:

- Ruth Watt married Dr Michael S. Veech on 17 February 1927
- Dodo Watt married John Francis "Frank" Irving on 18 September 1924
- Molly Watt married Bernard A. Hollingdale in 1937
- Helen Maude Watt (born c. 1902) married John Wigmore Drury on 26 April 1928. Their divorce three years later made the "scandal sheets".
- Meg Watt
- Joan Watt married Michael "Mick" Meagher around 30 November 1928
- Patricia Watt married Eric M. Fisher
- Betty Watt married John Coote on 17 May 1941

The family home was "Greystanes", Redmyre Road, Strathfield
