= The Twelve Theses (poster) =

1983 poster calling for repentance and reformation

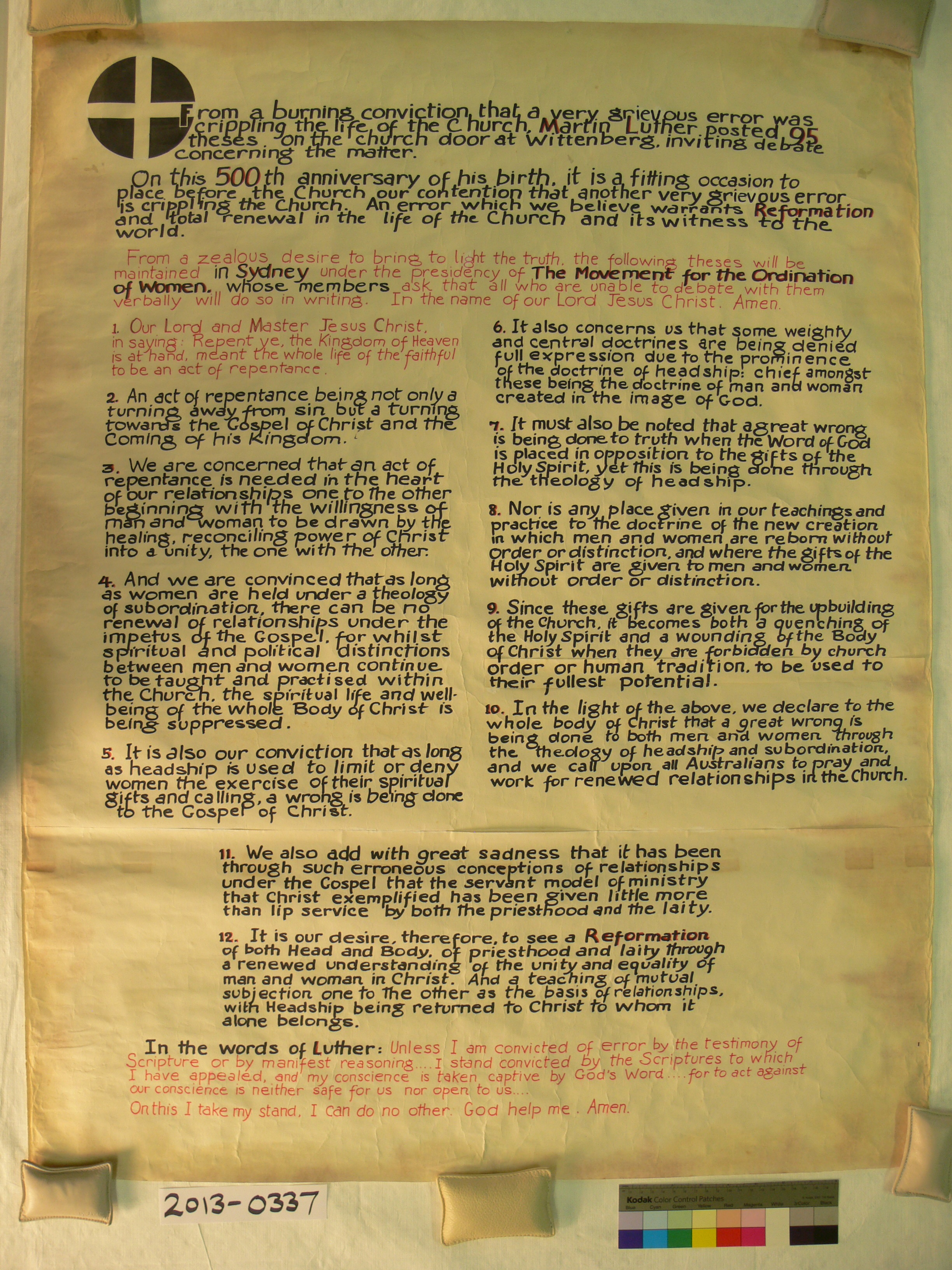
- The Twelve Theses poster in the collection of the Museum of Australian Democracy, Old Parliament House, Canberra, Australia
- Author: Susanne Glover
- Language: English
- Publisher: The Movement for the Ordination of Women (Sydney)
- Publication date: 4 October 1983
- Publication place: Sydney, Australia

The Twelve Theses was a poster modelled on Martin Luther's Ninety-five theses and blu-tacked to the chapter house door of St Andrew's Anglican Cathedral, Sydney on 4 October 1983 by members of the Movement for the Ordination of Women (MOW). The protest action on the eve of the Sydney Synod of the Anglican Church of Australia drew church and media attention to the issue of the ordination of women and with other campaigning and growing support, led to the ordination of women in most dioceses of the Anglican Church of Australia.

== Background ==
The Anglican Church of Australia is a federation of 23 dioceses; each diocese has its own synod and can make its own ordinances. In the 1970s and 80s some dioceses of the Anglican Church of Australia were moving slowly towards the ordination of women to the three orders of deacon, priest and bishop. The majority of the Anglican Doctrine Commission (Note: About: Anglican Church of Australia Doctrine Commission) had already agreed in 1973 there were no theological problems concerning the ordination of women to the three-fold order of ministry and presented a majority report on women in ministry to General Synod in 1977. That Synod agreed with the Commission and resolved, "the theological objections which have been raised do not constitute a barrier to the ordination of women to the priesthood or the consecration of women to the episcopate", but put off passing legislation to enable the ordination of women.^{:147}

Influential Sydney Anglicans at General Synod, in the Sydney Synod, and on the Doctrine Commission, opposed the ordination of women citing "male headship" theology as the created order whereby men were in authority over women in the church and family and women should willingly submit to that authority.^{:136} Canon Broughton Knox of Sydney had written a minority report to the Doctrine Commission which in part stated, “God’s Word makes clear that in creating humanity, God gave a headship to man which he did not give to woman".^{:68-69} Patricia Brennan wrote later "The talk of Christian mutual service and the complementarity of the natural roles for men and women had served as a smoke screen for the institutional domination of women by men. It seemed profoundly unchristian in the light of the exemplary statement by Jesus, 'I have not called you servants but friends' (John 15.15)."

After some resistance most dioceses gradually began ordaining women to the diaconate (from 1986) and to the priesthood (from 1992). Individual dioceses began to ordain women as priests in 1992 after General Synod finally resolved all legal questions. Women had only been allowed to become representatives on Sydney synod and its committees in 1972^{:22} so men were in the majority and were making decisions for women in ministry.^{:135} Despite some male clergy and administrators supporting the ordination of women, the Sydney diocese held its own doctrine commission and synod debates and drew its line at ordaining women as permanent deacons only (from 1989); finally rejecting women as priests in 1992.

== Protest and debate ==
The protracted debates and delays in ordaining women, especially in the Sydney diocese, led to the formation of protest groups and the publication of the "media attractive" Twelve Theses poster.

From the outset of protests by women, some in opposition to the ordination of women in the Sydney Anglican diocese alleged that the pro-ordination groups were influenced by "the values of an inappropriate feminism." Members of Anglican Women Concerned and the Movement for the Ordination of Women were theological students, Anglican lay people, clergy wives, male clergy and deaconesses.^{:6} For example, Heather Thomson, later to become the systematic theologian at St Mark's National Theological Centre, took part in those early demonstrations.^{:6} Members of MOW said their focus on the ordination of women arose from their reading of the whole of Scripture and was a theological position rather than a secular feminist viewpoint.

=== Anglican Women Concerned ===
In the 1970s women (with some male supporters) began organising protest groups to rally public and church backing for the ordination of women. Some smaller groups began to prepare women for ordination through theological study or talking with bishops about prospects for their ordination.^{:135}

Anglican Women Concerned first set the scene for protests with placards and symbolic actions to attract public and media attention. Colleen O’Reilly had been involved in the Australian Council of Churches ecumenical Commission on the Status of Women. She co-founded the Anglican women's group with Zandra Wilson (Note: Zandra Wilson was the wife of the future bishop, Bruce Wilson, who supported the ordination of women.) in Sydney in 1975.^{:181} From 1977 Anglican Women Concerned demonstrated, sometimes silently, outside the General and Sydney Synods using placards, pamphlets and street theatre to send their message that women should be ordained.

The 1981 General Synod was set to discuss the constitutional and legal questions on the ordination of women. Again Anglican Women Concerned protested with placards outside St Andrew's Cathedral, Sydney.^{:137} Photos and articles about the 1977 and 1981 protests appeared in the Sydney Morning Herald showing placards stating "Equal rites for women" and the Herald stated that reporters were more interested in the campaigning women than the synod, "… most of the reporters were … interviewing women supporters of women’s ordination at an impromptu press conference on the grass outside."

=== The Movement for the Ordination of Women (MOW) ===
During 1982—1983 Patricia Brennan was involved with Anglican Women Concerned. Brennan, as a member of a Sydney diocesan committee on women in ministry had surveyed women in church ministry in Sydney and found much dissatisfaction. In 1983 the Movement for the Ordination of Women was founded in Sydney by Colleen O'Reilly, Patricia Brennan and Marlene Cohen.

Its main aim was "To move all dioceses in the Anglican Church of Australia to admit women to the ordained ministries of the Church".

Broader motivations for setting up MOW were later given by Monica Furlong and Janet Scarfe. Monica Furlong, the moderator of the English MOW, visited MOW in Australia in 1984 saying "It seemed to me that it was the adamant, wounding kind of opposition within the Sydney diocese that got MOW started".^{:148} Scarfe stated in 2014, "The church excluded women from its ordained ministry but also to all intents and practical purpose from its language, lectionary readings and liturgy and from its decision-making bodies. The exclusion and invisibility of women, and most especially justifications and defence of the indignity, were hurtful and offensive."

MOW was formally launched in Sydney on 28 September 1983; for its first year MOW was a Sydney organisation then it formed a national network of state MOW branches. Its first protest action was the publication of the Twelve Theses poster.

== Twelve theses development and publication ==
1983 was the 500th anniversary of Martin Luther's birth. Various commemorations were held by Australian Protestant churches including a Reformation Rally organised by the Anglican Church League (Note: From its website: "...the ACL is an association of evangelical Australian Anglican Christians who desire to maintain the reformed, protestant and evangelical character of the Anglican Church...The League has been active in the Anglican Church of Australia since 1909, mainly in the Diocese of Sydney, but also by encouraging evangelical Christians elsewhere.") in November 1983. Members of MOW wanted to commemorate Luther and "imitate his prophetic action".

In its twelve statements the theses called for repentance from the theology of headship and subordination, a reformation of the Body of Christ (the church) through a "renewed understanding of the unity and equality of man and woman", and an open debate on the "grievous error", especially in the Anglican Diocese of Sydney. Posting the theses on the cathedral door was regarded as an "act of witness" by MOW, as a way of drawing attention to the errors of headship theology and the issue of the ordination of women during synods in Sydney. The Editorial Committee of Balaam's Ass wrote that the action was "a call to renewal and authentic reformation of the church, not its destruction."

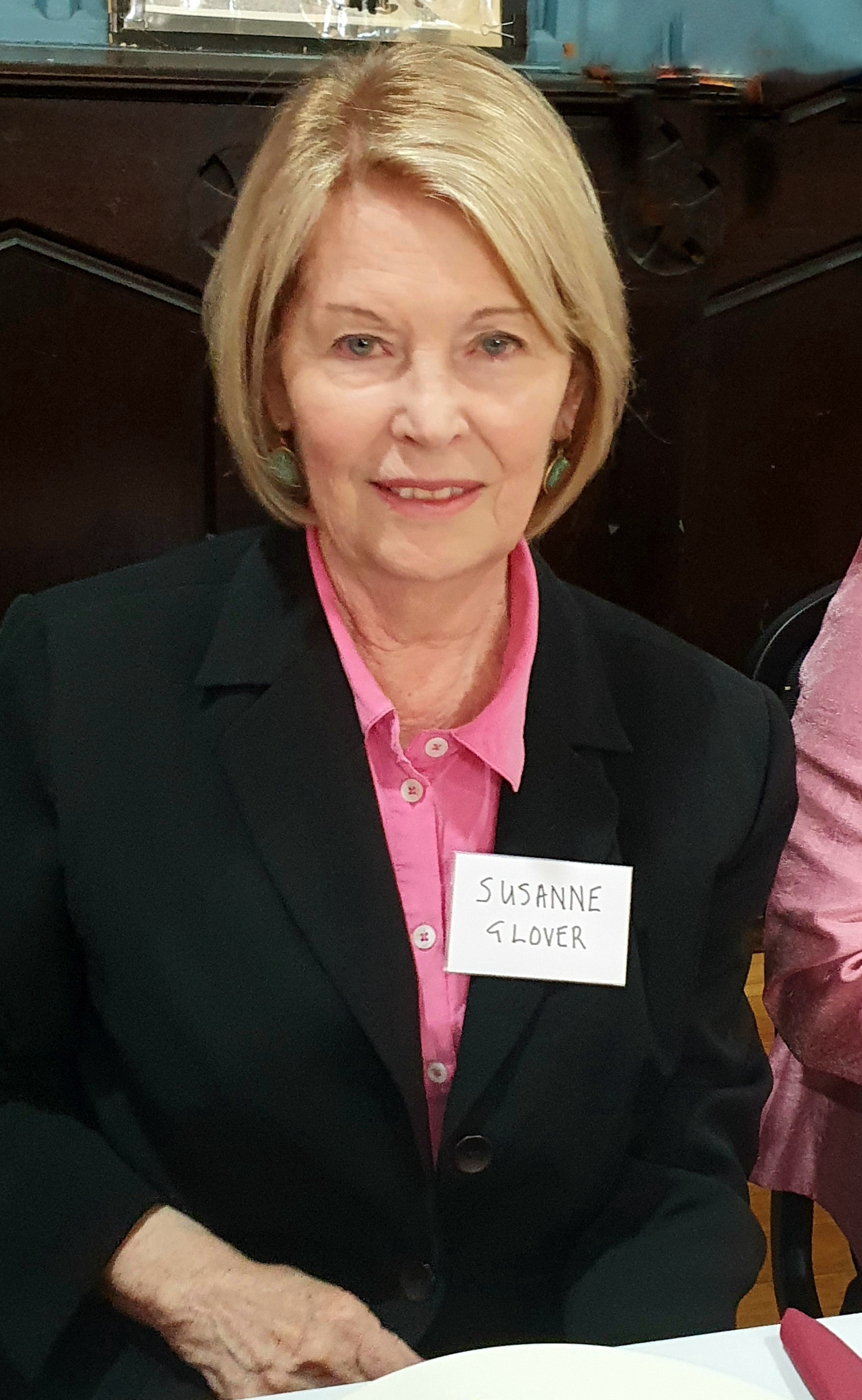
Susanne Glover at the anniversary in 2023 of 40 years of MOW activism in the Diocese of Sydney.

As it was a year of commemoration of Luther and the Reformation, the author of the twelve theses modelled the text and action on Martin Luther's Ninety-Five Theses. The author was Susanne Glover, (Note: Susanne Glover graduated with honours from Moore Theological College. She has a Bachelor of Divinity with Upper Second Class Honours from the University of London, and a M.Th and Ph.D from the University of Sydney.) then a theological student at Moore Theological College. Glover had already critiqued the theology of headship in an open letter in the Southern Cross, saying "...nowhere is a denial of servanthood so clearly portrayed than in the doctrine of headship. To claim to serve while at the same time denying others their call to service is a contradiction". In the theses Glover argued against headship and the subordination of women on theological grounds. She said that the doctrine of male headship overwhelmed and was in opposition to the scriptural teaching that the church was the Body of Christ, both men and women are made in the image of God and gifts are given to all by the Holy Spirit.

The poster was made of yellow parchment. Walter McEntee (Note: Fr Walter McEntee was then a Roman catholic priest who became a locum vicar, church historian, theological lecturer and chaplain in the Anglican Diocese of Melbourne.) wrote the text in calligraphy. The first logo of the newly formed Movement for the Ordination of Women was placed at the top left side. It was a black sphere with an overlaid white cross.

Some of the text echoed Luther's words from his theses, positioning MOW as church reformers. The introduction invited verbal or written debate with MOW, the first three statements called for repentance, as did Luther. The rest of Luther's theses were concerned with the practice of priests providing indulgences or remitting sins, while the twelve theses focussed on reconciling the relationship between men and women, and freeing women from the theology of subordination to exercise their spiritual gifts and calling. The 12th thesis called for a reformation and "a renewed understanding of the unity and equality of man and woman in Christ" with "headship being returned to Christ to whom it alone belongs". The final postscript quoted Luther "...my conscience is taken captive by God's word...On this I take my stand. I can do no other." (Note: "On this I take my stand, I can do no other" was at the time, attributed to Luther at the end of his speech when brought before the Diet of Worms and asked to recant. However it is now disputed he said this and it is suggested the phrase was added later.)

The poster was attached to the door of the cathedral by Colleen O’Reilly, Julia Perry and Ruth Jones with Patricia Brennan assisting (Note: The article in the Sydney Morning Herald of 5 October 1983 mistakenly named Julia Perry as Julia Berry. Julia Perry was one of the first women ordained as priests in the Anglican Church of Australia in 1992, in the Diocese of Newcastle.) on 4 October 1983, during the Sydney Synod. Removable adhesive was used to avoid allegations of vandalism.

== Original text ==
The text of the poster was reproduced inaccurately in the Movement for the Ordination of Women newsletter, Balaam's Ass in 1995 and more accurately in the document Forty Years of Activism Celebrating Sydney MOW, 2023. This is the text and punctuation of the original poster.

=== Text ===
From a burning conviction that a very grievous error was crippling the life of the Church, Martin Luther posted 95 theses on the church door at Wittenberg, inviting debate concerning the matter.

On this 500th anniversary of his birth, it is a fitting occasion to place before the Church our contention that another very grievous error is crippling the Church. An error which we believe warrants Reformation and total renewal in the life of the Church and its witness to the world.

From a zealous desire to bring to light the truth, the following theses will be maintained in Sydney under the presidency of The Movement for the Ordination of Women, whose members ask that all those who are unable to debate with them verbally will do so in writing. In the name of our Lord Jesus Christ. Amen.

1. Our Lord and Master Jesus Christ, in saying: Repent ye, the Kingdom of Heaven is at hand, meant the whole life of the faithful to be an act of repentance.
2. An act of repentance being not only a turning away from sin but a turning towards the Gospel of Christ and the Coming of his Kingdom.
3. We are concerned that an act of repentance is needed in the heart of our relationships one to the other beginning with the willingness of man and woman to be drawn by the healing, reconciling power of Christ into a unity, the one with the other.
4. And we are convinced that as long as women are held under a theology of subordination, there can be no renewal of relationships under the impetus of the Gospel, for whilst spiritual and political distinctions between men and women continue to be taught and practised within the Church, the spiritual life and well-being of the whole Body of Christ is being suppressed.
5. It is also our conviction that as long as headship is used to limit or deny women the exercise of their spiritual gifts and calling, a wrong is being done to the Gospel of Christ.
6. It also concerns us that some weighty and central doctrines are being denied full expression due to the prominence of the doctrine of headship: chief amongst these being the doctrine of man and woman created in the image of God.
7. It must also be noted that a great wrong is being done to truth when the Word of God is placed in opposition to the gifts of the Holy Spirit, yet this is being done through the theology of headship.
8. Nor is any place given in our teachings and practice to the doctrine of the new creation in which men and women are reborn without order or distinction, and the gifts of the Holy Spirit are given to men and women without order or distinction.
9. Since these gifts are given for the upbuilding of the Church, it becomes both a quenching of the Holy Spirit and a wounding of the Body of Christ when they are forbidden by Church order or human tradition, to be used to their fullest potential.
10. In the light of the above, we declare to the whole body of Christ that a great wrong is being done to both men and women through the theology of headship and subordination, and we call upon all Australians to pray and work for renewed relationships in the Church.
11. We also add with great sadness that it has been through such erroneous conceptions of relationships under the Gospel that the servant model of ministry that Christ exemplified has been given little more than lip service by both the priesthood and the laity.
12. It is our desire, therefore, to see a Reformation of both Head and Body, of priesthood and laity through a renewed understanding of the unity and equality of man and woman in Christ. And a teaching of mutual subjection one to the other as the basis of relationships, with Headship being returned to Christ to whom it alone belongs.

In the Words of Luther: Unless I am convicted of error by the testimony of Scripture or by manifest reasoning.... I stand convicted by the Scriptures to which I have appealed, and my conscience is taken captive by God’s Word.... for to act against our conscience is neither safe for us nor open to us....

On this I take my stand, I can do no other. God help me. Amen.

== Reaction and legacy ==
Although Rose states that the "call for reformation made no immediate impact", that was in relation to changing the minds of Sydney Synod. The action led to public and private debates and public speaking, particularly for Patricia Brennan, mainly in the mainstream press but less so in the Sydney diocese. A direct link was made by later commentators from the poster action to the eventual ordination of women as deacons from 1986, priests from 1992 and bishops from 2008.

The action was reported on at the time by the Sydney Morning Herald and other media. Vinson and Baldry wrote that in the 1980s in the mainstream press "most leading church news items have been on the passionate and vexed debate over the ordination of women".^{:133}

The Movement for the Ordination of Women had been calling for a public debate on the issue. The Australian Church Record (ACR) hosted a debate behind closed doors on 14 May 1984 and published a transcript in three parts in its editions of 11 June 1984, 25 June 1984, and 9 July 1984. Those who spoke in support of women's ordination were Charles Sherlock, Gordon Preece and Susanne Glover while those against were John Woodhouse and Robert Forsyth. (Note: Past editions of ACR also available at its archives on the website.)

Glover was dissatisfied with the debate and the ACR editor's framing of the arguments. She wrote in August 1984 about the debate, "...the Editor of A.C.R. worked extremely hard to enthuse his readers with his own opinions of it via strong and often mis-leading editorials....The major obstacle to women's ordination in Sydney, the doctrine of headship was barely touched on." She also objected to inclusion of the idea of subordination within the Trinity as a model for gender relations, saying they were "... quite willing to create a hierarchy within the Trinity in order to safeguard their interpretation of 1 Corinthians 11...in contradiction to the Athanasian Creed...in order to maintain their position." She also claimed her argument was based on "the person and work of Christ, giving him an interpretative role in Scripture which they fail to do".

In 1985 Patricia Brennan debated John Fleming (Note: Father John Fleming was a prominent campaigner against the ordination of women who had a radio program in Adelaide, South Australia.) on ABC's Pressure Point program. It was reported that public sympathy turned even more towards MOW and the ordination of women after this televised debate.

In 1987 a special General Synod was held to debate and resolve a Canon to allow women to be ordained as Anglican priests. A three-quarters majority vote was needed in each of the three houses of the Bishops, Clergy and Laity in order to pass the Bill. The vote was lost by 4 votes in the House of Clergy. Subsequently the poster was taken to the 1988 Lambeth Conference of Bishops in England by the MOW Australian women's delegation joining the international protest by the Women’s Witnessing Community.^{:146}

For the centenary celebration of The Deaconess Institution (now Mary Andrews College) in Sydney on 8 June 1991, MOW contributed to a display about women in ministry a photograph of Colleen O'Reilly, Julia Perry, and Patricia Brennan attaching the twelve theses to the door of St Andrew's Cathedral. The caption read "At their Wittenberg's end".

In 2009 John Cleary, hosting the ABC's Religion and Ethics program, interviewed Patricia Brennan. Cleary drew a direct line between the twelve theses poster and the ordination of women in most dioceses.

The Movement for the Ordination of Women in Australia began when a group of women nailed their theses to the door of the Chapter House at St Andrew's Cathedral in Sydney, demanding the ordination of women in a diocese governed by leaders who believe profoundly in an all-male priesthood. Twenty-five years later, there were over 400 women priests, 200 Deacons and 2 Bishops in Australia, although no women Priests or Bishops in Sydney. I began the conversation by suggesting to Patricia Brennan that this was quite a legacy.

— John Cleary, Remembering Patricia Brennan

At the 2012 MOW conference in Canberra, the Twelve Theses poster was donated to the Museum of Australian Democracy in Old Parliament House by the outgoing President of MOW, Susan Sandford. The poster was accepted by MOAD as consistent with its collection vision, "The Museum of Australian Democracy Collection is connected to and located within the historical heart of Australian government. It captures the ideas, movements, individuals and events of Australian democracy." During the conference, the then Governor-General of Australia, Quentin Bryce, hosted a MOW delegation for afternoon tea at Government House. Bryce had an association with MOW having previously spoken at its 1992 National Conference about her review of the Sex Discrimination Act 1984 when she was Federal Sex Discrimination Commissioner, Human Rights and Equal Opportunity Commission, from 1988 to 1993. In her comments at the end of the published keynote address she said, "Like many Australians I have great admiration and respect for the strength, courage and determination of the remarkable women and men of the movement."

In 2025 McEwan, Shorter and Riches described MOW as a "feminist complaint collective" and the attachment of the poster as "feminist doorway activism" which eventually opened the door to the ordination of women.

Calling to mind Martin Luther’s alleged doorway protest, members of MOW gathered at St Andrew’s Cathedral, Sydney and glued their ‘protest against the Church (12 propositions for the ordination of women) to a door of the Cathedral’ (Scarfe, 2012: 122). MOW’s protest was penned by then theology student, Susanne Glover (Piggin and Linder, 2020). Glover named the complementarian principle of male headship as an errant theology which was being used to limit women (Piggin and Linder, 2020). In gluing Glover’s (theological and feminist) complaint against headship to the cathedral door, MOW brought public attention to the long-standing problem of sexism with the Anglican Church of Australia. By co-opting a physical Cathedral door MOW’s protest was loud, public, and unavoidable... This protest eventually opened the door to women’s ordination in most of the Anglican Church of Australia. However, the door to ordination remains closed in the Sydney Anglican Diocese...

— McEwan, Tracy; Shorter, Rosie C.; Riches, Tanya, Feminist Complaint Collectives and Doorway Disruptions in Australian Christian Traditions

== See also ==
- List of the first women ordained as priests in the Anglican Church of Australia in 1992
- List of women bishops in the Anglican Church of Australia
- Ordination of women in the Anglican Diocese of Sydney
- Ordination of women in the Anglican communion
