= Preachers, Prophets and Heretics =

2012 book on Australian women's ministry

- Editors: Elaine Lindsay and Janet Scarfe
- Language: English
- Subject: Anglican Church of Australia
- Publisher: UNSW Press
- Publication date: 2012
- Publication place: Australia
- Media type: Print (Paperback)
- Pages: 400
- ISBN: 9781742233376

Preachers, Prophets and Heretics is a book published in 2012 to mark the 20th anniversary of the ordination of women as priests in the Anglican Church in Australia. It was edited by Elaine Lindsay and Janet Scarfe.

It was the first book to document and analyse the ordination debate and how it occupied church synods, ecclesiastical tribunals, and civil courts, as well as making media headlines. The book also highlights the accomplishments of the more than 500 female priests that had been ordained since 1992.

== Australian Movement for the Ordination of Women ==
The struggle for women to be admitted as priests in the Anglican Church of Australia was long and bitter. Preachers, Prophets and Heretics places this struggle in the context of similar debates occurring throughout the Anglican Communion around the world.

The Australian Movement for the Ordination of Women (MOW) was founded in 1983 to advocate for the ordination of women as deacons, priests and bishops in the Anglican Church of Australia. Initially started in Sydney, the group soon expanded to become a national organisation with regional groups located around the country. One of the book's editors, Elaine Lindsay, is praised personally for her introductory chapter which honours the late Patricia Brennan, the first president of MOW). Both editors were active members of MOW. Scarfe was also a former president and Lindsay is the current President of MOW.

The first ordination of women as priests in the Anglican Church of Australia occurred in 1992. The Anglican Diocese of Sydney continues to oppose the ordination of women as priests (or presbyters) and bishops, although it has ordained women as deacons since 1989. The Movement for the Ordination of Women (newsletter) records the history of the various debates and challenges faced by the movement, as well as reporting general news and activities of the MOW regional groups.

== Reception ==
Preachers, Prophets and Heretics was launched at three separate events held in Melbourne, Sydney and Adelaide, with many of the book's contributors speaking at these events. The nineteen essays in the book have been described as "well-researched and substantiated, with the authors' writing styles often facilitating both emotional and intellectual responses..." The volume has been described as a well-presented and significant collection with another reviewer saying that the book "is inspiring in its record of creative, faithful service". The book was shortlisted for the Australian Christian Book of the Year Awards in 2013.

== Contributors ==
Contributors to the volume are key players in the ordination debate. They include Australian judge Keith Mason, Anglican bishop Keith Rayner and the former Archbishop of Perth, Peter Carnley, who broke the impasse by ordaining women before national legislation was passed. The academics, historians and theologians that contributed to the volume include Anne O'Brien, Peter Sherlock, David Hilliard, Stuart Piggin, Katharine Massam, Dorothy Lee, and Heather Thomson. Other contributors include Janet Nelson, Anglican priests Elizabeth J. Smith and Peta Sherlock, internationally recognised author and commentator the Very Reverend Dr Jane Shaw, journalist Muriel Porter and religion producer and broadcaster Rachael Kohn. One of the book's editors, Janet Scarfe, contributed two chapters to the volume. One documented the history of the Movement for the Ordination of Women and the other was the result of Scarfe's 260 extended interviews with the first generation of women who were ordained deacons and priests. Both editors, Lindsay and Scarfe were interviewed by Kohn on an episode of ABC Radio National program The Spirit of Things shortly after the book was published.
