= Peta Sherlock =

Australian Anglican priest

The Very Reverend Peta Sherlock

Dean, Anglican Diocese of Bendigo
- In office 2006–2011
- Preceded by: John W. Stewart
- Succeeded by: John Roundhill

Archdeacon of LaTrobe
- In office 2001–2005

Area Dean Melbourne City
- In office 2000–2001

Personal life
- Born: Peta Robin Sproule
- Spouse: Charles Sherlock
- Notable work(s): Inside the Sunday Gospels: Years A, B, C

Religious life
- Religion: Christian
- Denomination: Anglican Church of Australia
- Church: St Paul's Cathedral, Bendigo
- Ordination: Deacon 1986, Priest 1992

Peta Sherlock (born Peta Robin Sproule) (1946-) is an Australian Anglican priest who was formerly Dean of the Anglican Diocese of Bendigo at St Paul's Anglican Cathedral, Bendigo. She was one of the first women ordained as an Anglican deacon in 1986 then as an Anglican priest in 1992 and the first woman Dean of an Anglican diocese in Australia.

== Personal life ==
Peta Sproule married Charles Henry Sherlock in 1970. Charles calls her his "co-theologian". They have two sons, one of whom is Peter Sherlock.

== Ministry and career ==
Sherlock began her career as a school teacher, after graduating with a Bachelor of Arts at the Australian National University in 1968 and a Diploma of Education from the University of New South Wales in 1969. She began studying theology at Ridley College, Melbourne in the 1970s and graduated with a Bachelor of Theology in 1980. She began speaking publicly about the ordination of women in the Anglican church while at Ridley. In 1976, she was interviewed for a newspaper with fellow student Narelle Mitchell and tutor Barbara Darling. In 1977, the Doctrine Commission of the Anglican Church of Australia submitted a report to be debated at the General Synod which, among other recommendations, stated that "There are no theological objections to the admission of women to the diaconate and to the priesthood, or the consecration of women to the episcopate." There were letters for and against the report in church media including Australian Church Record. Sherlock wrote two letters, one responding to a letter from Fred Nile and one responding to an editorial column, saying that both had misrepresented the majority report and the arguments of people who called for the ordination of women, and in the case of the editorial, pointed out it had argued against the historic creeds of the church.

Sherlock met Patricia Brennan, future President/Co Convenor of Movement for the Ordination of Women (MOW), at the National Evangelical Anglican Congress in 1981. The ordination of women was discussed in workshops at that conference and a suggestion was put to the Congress to debate the motion "Anglican Evangelicals believe that there are no fundamental theological objections to the ordination of women to the priesthood." Sherlock became National Secretary of MOW 1992–1994.

=== Ordination ===
Sherlock was ordained deacon on Ascension Day, 30 May 1986 in the first group of women ordained deacons Australia-wide, and the second group of women to be ordained deacons in Melbourne. She served as a school chaplain at Firbank Grammar School 1986–88, Assistant Curate at Ridley 1988-89 and Chaplain at Lowther Hall Anglican Grammar School 1990–91.

In 1992, Sherlock was ordained as a priest by Keith Rayner (then Anglican Primate of Australia) in St Paul's Cathedral, Melbourne and granted permission to officiate 1991–92. Sherlock was one of the ninety-three women ordained or licensed as priests for the first time in the Anglican Church in Australia.

=== Later career ===
Subsequently, Sherlock was appointed Priest-in-Charge, St Andrew's, Clifton Hill with St Luke's, North Fitzroy 1992-01 during which time she was also Area Dean Melbourne City 2000–01. She published three commentaries on the lectionary, Inside The Sunday Gospels (1994–96) to accompany the new A Prayer Book for Australia. She had written papers for the General Synod Liturgical Commission which revised the prayer book for the Australian Anglican Church in 1994 (adopted by General Synod and published in 1995).

From 2001 to 2003, Sherlock was Incumbent of St John's, Heidelberg and Incumbent Banyule parish 2003. In this period, she was also Archdeacon of La Trobe 2001–05. She was awarded a Doctor of Ministry Studies by the Melbourne College of Divinity (now the University of Divinity) in 2004.

In 2005, Sherlock said this about the Bible and women: "If we truly believe 2 Timothy 3:16, 'All Scripture is useful', then we will not make prejudgments about which parts of Scripture are more useful than others. We will read the lot. I have read the lot at least once in my life and can testify that reading everything the Bible had to say about women set me free."

In 2003, and again in 2006, there was media discussion about the possibility of Sherlock (along with other women) being appointed the first woman bishop in the Anglican Church in Australia. None of the women were made bishop at that time. Subsequently, in 2008 Kay Goldsworthy became the first female bishop (Assistant Bishop consecrated in Perth on 22 May) then Barbara Darling, Bishop for Diocesan Ministries in Melbourne on 31 May.

Sherlock became Dean of the Anglican Diocese of Bendigo and Incumbent of St Paul's Cathedral in 2006 until her retirement in 2011. From 2009, because of potential for the roof to collapse and the stained glass windows to break, she had to supervise the closure of the cathedral and reconstruction of the roof and hold services in the church hall. Sherlock said that the outcome of meeting in the hall was that the clergy were closer to the people in the congregation and people in the congregation also became closer to each other.

=== Retirement ===
After retirement, Sherlock moved to Trentham, Victoria where she became a local historian. Having received permission to officiate again in the Diocese of Bendigo, in 2012 and 2013 she was locum rector for Kyneton Anglican church and St Mary's Anglican church, Woodend.

In 2012, Sherlock published an essay about her time as a deacon, priest and dean, "Twenty years a priest: To desire God". She said that when women were first ordained some chose to stay outside church structures but she decided to remain inside and be an agent of change. In that essay she summed up her leadership in ministry, "...the ministry of a congregation is not determined by its clergy but can be gathered by its constituents...I try to look at who is there and what gifts are available, and that will tell me what our main focus should be...If I had to summarise my ministry, it is to enable others (and whole churches) to get about the ministry God has for them...I am not afraid to take up the authority of being a priest, but there is more to leadership than telling people what to think and what to do. My main task is to do theology...And I teach others to do theology too, to seek God in all things."

== Publications ==
- 1989 "On wings of peace" in Fit for this office: Women and ordination, Collins Dove.
- 1990 The God Book: Much More Than A Role Play Game (with Charles Sherlock), Inter-Varsity; Six carol services for churches and schools, Joint Board of Christian Education.
- 1992 "Voices: a selection of writings mainly from MOW publication, in which women reflect on God, our Scriptures, our power and our Eucharist" in Changing women, changing church: Festschrift to Patricia Brennan. Foundation president of the Movement for the Ordination of Women, Millennium Books; "The other Mary speaks up" in Movement for the Ordination of Women: The national magazine for the Movement for the Ordination of Women incorporating Ebb and Flow, MOW.
- 1994-1996 Inside The Sunday Gospels:Year C, EJ Dwyer Ltd.; 1995 Inside The Sunday Gospels, Year A, EJ Dwyer Ltd.; 1996 Inside the Sunday Gospels: New Commentaries for the Year of Mark: Year B, EJ Dwyer Ltd.
- 1996-97 Feet on the Ground: What Did It Mean for God to Come to Earth? (with John Lane), Scripture Union Australia 1996; 1997 "Reading the Bible through a woman's eyes" in Fabric faith and friendship: Women changing church and society, Desbooks.
- 2003-04 Sermons at Banyule parish: What a waste, Reflection, Palm Sunday 2003, St John's Heidelberg; Good News Indeed, Easter Day at Rosanna, 2003; Being disciples, February 7–8, 2004, Watsonia and Heidelberg.
- 2004 All scripture is useful: case studies in the proclamation of the diverse, marginal and whole canon of scripture, Thesis, Report of research project (DMin), Melbourne College of Divinity.
- 2005 Between the Lines: Reading the Bible for our Time, a talk for [Australian Church Union] ACU 31 August 2005.
- 2007 Vocation, sermon, St Peter's Eastern Hill, Melbourne, 4 February 2007.
- 2011 "The Dean looks at—Mary Magdalene" in The Spirit (Anglican Diocese of Bendigo), August 2011, Silver Award, Best Theological Reflection, 2012, Australasian Religious Press Association.
- 2012 "Reading Romans as Anglicans: Romans 1:26-27" in Five uneasy pieces: essays on scripture and sexuality, ATF Press; "Twenty years a priest: to desire God" in Preachers, Prophets and Heretics: Anglican Women's Ministry, UNSW Press; Plenary speaker on theme, "The Theological Interpretation of Bible, Church and World", 2012 ANZATS Conference.
- 2013 "Practising Hermeneutics in the Parish", ANZATS, The Australian And New Zealand Association Of Theological Studies, Volume 45:1 May 2013.
- 2015-2022 "The disturbance in the choir 1891: a year in the life of St George's Church of England, Trentham: celebrating 150 years of Anglican worship in Trentham 1864-2014" in The Recorder, Trentham Historical Society; 2015 "Trentham State School no.1588: the early years 1875-1918" in The Recorder, Trentham Historical Society; 2017 "The Tresidder Family in Trentham and district" in The Recorder, Trentham Historical Society; 2022 These walls could speak: a history of St George's Trentham 1864-2022.

== See also ==
- Ordination of women in the Anglican Communion
- List of the first women ordained as priests in the Anglican Church of Australia in 1992
