= Church Scene =

Former Anglican newspaper in Australia

Church Scene was an independent Anglican newspaper based in Melbourne, Australia, published from 1971 to 1997.

== History ==
A previous national Anglican newspaper, The Anglican (first published in 1952), had ceased publication in 1970.

Church Scene was owned by the MacKeller family, through a company, Church Press Limited. Originally a fortnightly publication, it later became weekly.

The editorial line was liberal. An early editorial, in 1971, prompted a strong response from the evangelical Australian Church Record, published in Sydney. A Buddhist, My Nguyen Tang Canh, had been appointed to the staff of the World Council of Churches. Church Scene published an editorial defending the appointment; the Australian Church Record described the appointment as 'reprehensible' and 'deplorable', and concluded that its defence "hardly does credit to the intelligence of Australian Anglicans".

On Davis's retirement as editor in 1995, on a motion moved by Deaconess Margaret Rodgers, General Synod recorded its appreciation of his work as editor and manager of Church Scene, noting that it had been published at no cost to the Anglican Church.

The newspaper closed, suddenly, immediately before Christmas 1997, as a result of financial constraints. Despite attempts at a rescue, the newspaper went into voluntary liquidation in January the following year. Although not a direct replacement, a monthly magazine, Market-place, stepped into the gap, and was published from 1997 to 2008.

== Editors ==
- Gerald Charles Davis, 1971-95
- Charles Sherlock, 1995-97
