= Twelve Theses =

Twelve Theses may refer to:

- Twelve Theses (leaflet), a list of statements and demands "against the un-German spirit" issued in 1933 by the German Student Union
- The Twelve Theses (poster), attached to the door of St Andrew's Anglican Cathedral, Sydney, in 1983 by members of the Movement for the Ordination of Women
