= The Anglican =

Former Anglican newspaper in Australia

The Anglican was a national Anglican newspaper based in Sydney, Australia, published from 1952 to 1970.

== Origins ==
The Rt Rev Montagu Stone-Wigg retired as the first Bishop of New Guinea in 1908. He settled in Sydney, and established the Church Standard in 1912 as a strongly Anglo-Catholic church newspaper, but which was nevertheless the official newspaper of the Church of England in Australia, as the Anglican Church of Australia was then called. By 1952 the Church Standard was "ailing", and Bishop Moyes, the long-standing Bishop of Armidale encouraged the journalist Francis James to take it over and revive it.

== History ==
James's renamed The Anglican expressly stated that in its masthead that it incorporated the Church Standard; a number of diocesan newspapers were closed to support its sale. The last editor of the Church Standard, W Basil Oliver, was briefly the first editor of The Anglican. James installed his wife, Joyce, as editor in 1954, although James, the publisher, was often described as the editor.

In 1957 James established the Anglican Press Ltd to print The Anglican and other publications. The Anglican Press went into receivership in 1960. This coincided with competition between Sir Frank Packer and Rupert Murdoch for the share of the suburban newspaper market. In turn that led to a notorious brawl at the Anglican Press between Clyde and Kerry Packer, on the one hand, and James and the journalist and former boxer Frank Browne, on the other. James and Browne were the victors.

The Anglican was widely read until the mid-1960s, but James ran a strongly anti-Vietnam War editorial line, alienating readers and causing the cancellation of many subscriptions. Three times The Anglican published scoops about unacknowledged deployments of Australian soldiers to Vietnam, to the rage of the conservative Prime Minister, Sir Robert Menzies. The paper had a low view of Menzies, describing him in an editorial of 1961 as a "preposterous poseur", who should be removed from public life. In 1963 the acting national president of the Returned Services League, Sir Raymond Huish, issued The Anglican with a writ for defamation, following the publication of an editorial about the RSL entitled "A Cow – Sacred Or Profane?" In 1967 the offices of the paper were ransacked; the only items that were stolen were files about Vietnam.

In November 1969 James was travelling from London to Sydney, and, stopping in Hong Kong, travelled into China, where he was imprisoned. He was not released until January 1973 on the personal entreaty of the new Australian Prime Minister Gough Whitlam, an old school friend of James's.

== Closure ==
Meanwhile, The Anglican had ceased to publish, during James's imprisonment, in 1970. A relaunch with a new editor was announced in 1970, but this was short-lived, and it ceased publication that year. The following year its place as a national Anglican newspaper was taken by the independently published Church Scene.

== Editors ==
- Walter Basil Oliver, 1952–1954.
- Joyce James, 1954-1970
- Leslie Jillett, 1970.
