= Wendy Solling =

Australian Anglican religious sister, priest, and sculptor (1926–2002)

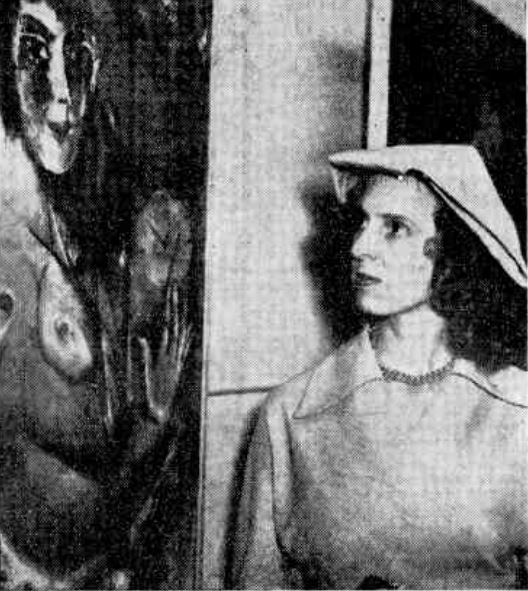
- Solling at the "French Painting Today" exhibition in Sydney, 1953
- Born: 1926; Maitland, New South Wales, Australia
- Died: 20 January 2002 (aged 75–76); Brevard, North Carolina, United States
- Other names: Sister Angela
- Occupations: Sculptor, Franciscan nun

Wendy Hope Solling (7 March 1926 – 20 January 2002) was an Australian sculptor, Anglican Franciscan nun, and one of the earliest women ordained in the Anglican Church of Australia.

== Early life and education ==
Wendy Hope Solling was born to Daisy Clarence (née Blomfield) and Fritz Peter Max Solling in Maitland, New South Wales. She had two younger brothers, Michael and Peter.

Solling went to primary school in Maitland, New South Wales and was sent to SCEGGS boarding school in Moss Vale to improve her health, having suffered from chronic bronchitis. During this time she was a prefect, House Captain and Joint Senior School Prefect. She was also captain of both the house and school cricket teams.

In 1946, she attended the East Sydney Technical College which later became the National Art School. Her teacher there was Lyndon Dadswell. After graduation in 1948, she went to the Slade Art School, London. While in London, exhibitions displaying her sculpture attracted attention.

== Artistic career ==
Solling held her first solo exhibition at the Galerie Apollinaire in 1951. She was then commissioned for several portraits, including of the Australian High Commissioner in London, Sir Thomas White, and Covent Garden singer Rosina Raisbeck.

As a sculptor, Solling worked with stone, wood, ebony, plaster, iron and wire.

In 1952, Solling returned to Australia and had several successful exhibitions, including a solo exhibition at the David Jones Art Gallery in September of that year.

Solling and Kathleen Shillam were the only women in the group exhibition held by the Society of Sculptors and Associates at the David Jones Art Gallery in 1955. Her wood and copper-wire mural, The Man from Snowy River, is currently at the Ashfield Hotel, Sydney. She has other works which reside in the Anglican cathedral in Newcastle, New South Wales.

== Religious life ==
Solling wrote to Mother Gwenda Mary who was the Sister in Charge of the Poor Clares at Freeland, Oxfordshire to enquire about joining the order. She was accepted as a postulant and returned to England on the SS Orion in 1955 to live with the Anglican Community of St Clare. Solling made her profession and since there was already a Sister Wendy chose the name Sister Angela. She chose Angela "because the horse-riding, rebellious cartoon Angela of the battered St. Trinians hat, who kept her cigarettes and whisky flask in her gym pants" who had "always appealed to me," said Solling.

Solling was a frequent correspondent with Helen Joseph, a South African political prisoner and author of Tomorrow's Sun. Solling and Joseph met at the Airport Holiday Inn, Cape Town, in 1971 when Solling made a trip to Australia to care for her sick mother. They met at the airport on the instructions of Solling's mother superior who required her not to break her vows of an enclosed life.

In 1972, Solling returned to Australia by boat at the invitation of the Bishop of Newcastle, Ian Shevill, and lived in the rectory of St John's Church at Stroud, New South Wales. She was accompanied by Alison Francis who was originally from New Zealand, and Caroline Mary, an English sister. Sister Marilyn, who was born in Adelaide joined them soon after.

Between 1978 and 1980, the Monastery of the Blessed Virgin Mary and the Hermitage of the Bernadine of Siena were built for the growing group of sisters, overseen by Solling who viewed it as a "work of Sculpture". The buildings were blessed and dedicated on 12 July 1980. During this time Solling was diagnosed with bowel cancer which required a colostomy.

In 1998, Solling suggested that the group of Australian nuns become autonomous from the house at Freeland, in part due to ongoing tensions between the two groups.

Solling supported Patricia Brennan in her Movement for the Ordination of Women. Solling was ordained as a deacon on 11 November 1989 by the Bishop of Newcastle and as a priest in Christ Church Cathedral, Newcastle, on 21 December 1992, the first year in which women were ordained as priests in the Anglican Church of Australia.

In 1993, the monastery was accepted into the Order of St Francis as a second-order community. Solling added additional buildings to the monastery which were opened to lay women, who came to learn about spirituality, Indigenous culture and other matters. These buildings were called Gunya Chiara, using an Indigenous word for 'meeting' and the Italian spelling for 'Clare'.

Towards the end of her life, Solling suffered from ill-health (including two mini strokes) which was exacerbated by the stress of the monastery. Solling was at this time the only remaining sister and the community ended when she moved to the United States in 2000, after the library, workshop and other buildings at Stroud burned down. In the last two years of her life, she lived in Boston and North Carolina with the Reverend Carter Heyward and Alison Cheek.

== Death ==
Rachael Kohn notes that Solling was active and riding horses up to the time she had a stroke and died. A funeral service was held for her at St Philip's Episcopal church in Brevard, North Carolina, on 9 February 2002. Memorial services were also held in Newcastle, Australia, and at the Stroud Monastery. After her death in 2002, Solling's ashes were scattered partly in the United States and partly in Australia.
