= Margaret Rodgers (deaconess) =

Australian deaconess (1939–2014)

Deaconess Margaret Rodgers AM

Margaret Rodgers AM (18 December 1939 – 31 May 2014) was a prominent deaconess and lay-person in the Anglican Diocese of Sydney. Rodgers was Principal of Deaconess House, (1976–85), Research Officer for the Anglican General Synod (1985–93), chief executive officer of the Anglican Media Council (1994–2003), President of the New South Wales Council of Churches and Lay Canon of St Andrew's Cathedral, Sydney.

== Early life ==
Margaret Amelia Rodgers was born on 18 December 1939 in Dorrigo, New South Wales, the eldest child of David Alexander Rodgers and his wife Mavis. David Rodgers was a timber worker, but developed multiple sclerosis, and as a result, the family moved to Dapto, where Margaret and her younger brother Alan attended primary school. Rodgers then went to Wollongong Selective High School. She was an excellent student and also a good hockey player. After being accepted for the Figtree Hockey Team, she fell sick with rheumatic fever and was confined to bed, spending more than two years in Wollongong Hospital. Her heart was permanently affected by the illness.

== Academic life ==
Rodgers moved to Sydney to study, and gained a Bachelor of Arts degree from Sydney University. She then undertook a diploma of theology, completed in 1963 with first class honours. She was ordained as a deaconess of the Anglican Church in 1970. From 1965 to 1978, she taught History and Divinity at Meriden School for Girls at Strathfield and Abbotsleigh School for Girls at Wahroonga. From 1973 to 1975 she was warden at Church of England Women's Hall, Glebe. From 1969–73 she was a tutor at Deaconess House, (later known as Mary Andrews College), then became Vice-Principal and in 1976 succeeded Mary Andrews as principal, until 1985, providing pastoral care for female students who attended Moore Theological College and Sydney University. Rodgers lectured at Moore College in Church History.

Archbishop Glenn Davies described Rodgers as being "passionate about women's ministry and particularly the order of deaconesses". Rodgers never sought to become ordained as a priest, which would have necessitated her leaving the Diocese of Sydney, to which she was committed and where she had a wide and effective lay ministry. While supporting women in lay ministry, Rodgers also gave her support and encouragement to those women who chose to leave the diocese to seek ordination as priests elsewhere.

== Roles in the Sydney Diocese ==
From the 1970s, Rodgers attended St Stephen's Anglican Church, Newtown, located in the same suburb as Deaconess House and Moore College. Through the latter decades of the 20th century, St Stephen's maintained a close association with the Movement for the Ordination of Women, and was attended by many Anglicans who found themselves marginalised because of broken marriages, gender identity or liberal views. Rodgers was an active member of the congregation, serving on parish council, as a nominator and as a synod representative. She was appointed a diocesan reader, regularly reading services and occasionally preaching, at which times her scholarship and her insight into the Christian Church in other countries that she visited were much valued.

Rodgers was a member of the Diocesan Synod from 1976 to 2011, and in 1978, became the first woman elected to the Standing Committee of the Diocese of Sydney. From 1985 to 1993 Rodgers served as the Research Officer for General Synod. From 1981–2000, she was a member of the Standing Committee of the General Synod of the Anglican Church of Australia, and continued as a synod member until 2010.

Rodgers served on a number of committees of the Anglican Church including the Social Issues Committee of the Sydney Diocese, the Doctrine Commission of the General Synod; the General Synod Task Force on Mission, Evangelism, Ministry and Training, and the Ecumenical Affairs Committee of the Diocese of Sydney. Rodgers was a representative of the Anglican Consultative Council in Wales in 1990, Panama in 1996, Dundee in 1999, and Hong Kong in 2002. In 1998 Rodgers attended the Lambeth Conference of Anglican Bishops, as a media officer.

Rodgers was a board member of the Anglican Deaconess Institution. She was a board member of World Vision, Australia, from 1999 to 2008; was a board member, then chairman of New College, University of New South Wales; joint president of the Christian Conference of Asia 1995–2000; an observer of the World Council of Churches and an Anglican representative of the National Council of Churches of Australia from 1994 to 2007.

=== Roles in the media ===
Rodgers regularly wrote columns for Southern Cross, the news magazine of the Sydney Diocese, demonstrating natural diplomacy and great skills at working with the media. This led to her appointment as the first chief executive officer of Anglican Media, a post she held from 1994 to 2003, and saw, among other successes, the readership of Southern Cross rise to more than 40,000 per monthly issue. From 2004 to 2007 she was Archbishop's Media Officer to Archbishop Peter Jensen.

Rodgers served for many years on the NSW Council of Churches, and in 2008 was elected president, the first woman to hold this position. From 1997 to 2009 Rodgers was the writer and presenter of weekly news program on Radio 2CH on behalf of the NSW Council of Churches. John Sandeman, who worked with Rodgers on the Anglican Media Council, referred to Rodgers as a "master tactician at the media game", citing her extraordinary ability to get positive press in the general media for the Anglican Church in Sydney, and for the wider Anglican Communion.

== Death ==
Rodgers died of a heart attack on 31 May 2014. Her funeral was held at St Stephen's Anglican Church, Newtown, and was attended by four bishops with whom she had served, as well as many other members of the clergy and laity whose ministry she had facilitated or encouraged.

== Honours and tributes ==
In January 2014, Rodgers was made a Member of the Order of Australia for "significant service to the Anglican Church of Australia through governance and representational roles, and to ecumenical affairs".

In announcing Rodger's death, Archbishop Glenn Davies described her as "a warrior for Christ" and "for many years the leading laywoman of the Diocese of Sydney." He said "She made her mark not only on the Anglican Church in Sydney but also on the National Church and the Anglican Communion as a whole." On 19 June, she was honoured with public service of thanksgiving for her life and service, at St Andrew's Cathedral, Sydney.

John Sandeman wrote:

"Margaret Rodgers by any measure was one of the most powerful people in the Anglican Diocese of Sydney, a body which only has male clergy. This puzzled everyone, except for those who worked with her and knew that talent had risen to the top."
