= Di Nicolios =

Australian Anglican priest

The Venerable Di Nicolios
- Born: Dianne Dialecti Nicolios; 1947 (age 78–79)
- Religion: Christian
- Church: Anglican Church of Australia
- Ordained: Deacon 1989, priest 2002
- Offices held: Archdeacon for Women's Ministries, Anglican Diocese of Sydney Priest-in-Charge, St John's Anglican Church, Diamond Creek parish, Anglican Diocese of Melbourne Archdeacon of The Yarra, Anglican Diocese of Melbourne

Dianne Dialecti "Di" Nicolios (born 1947) is a retired Australian Anglican priest. She was the first woman appointed Archdeacon for Women's Ministries in the Anglican Diocese of Sydney. She held that position from 1994 to 2002. She was also one of the first group of 14 women to be ordained a deacon in 1989 in the Sydney diocese.

In 2002, Nicolios resigned as archdeacon to become an ordained priest in the Anglican Diocese of Melbourne and rector of St John's parish in Diamond Creek. She later became Archdeacon of The Yarra, then an assistant priest in the parish of Kew and returned to Sydney as an assistant at Christ Church Lavender Bay.

== Life and ministry ==
At the October 1993 synod of the Sydney Anglican diocese, Archbishop Harry Goodhew announced: "With a view to advancing the ministry of women in the Diocese, I have appointed the Reverend Dianne Nicolios as an Archdeacon with special responsibilities for women's ministry. She has an extensive job description which includes the support and encouragement of women both ordained and non-ordained." During her time as archdeacon, Nicolios developed a strategy for ministry by women, both lay and ordained and organised conferences for women in ministry.

At the same synod, Nicolios was elected to the board of management of the Department of Evangelism and as a diocesan representative on General Synod. During this period she was a member of: the Olympic Games Taskforce and helped establish Anglican Sports Ministries, the Minute Reading Committee, the Synod Committee on Clergy Tenure, the Stipends and Allowances Committee, the Synod Standing Committee, and the Board of Management of the Department of Evangelism. She was also an Associate Evangelist, Department of Evangelism. As chair of Anglican Deaconess Institution, she established scholarships for women to open up new areas of ministry.

In 1994, Goodhew asked Nicolios to report to him on the ministry of women and the report was released to the standing committee in 1996. Nicolios found two results significant: majority support amongst clergy for women to be assistant ministers including as teachers, preachers and service leaders; and from women in ministry, the desire for acknowledgement and valuing of their ministries. Recommendations included: “That a review of diocesan policies be made... That a Women’s Advisory Council be established... [and] That the issues raised in this report... be promoted for discussion within the Diocese...” Nicolios organised the 1998 Conference on Women's Ministry. Two papers for and against the ordination of women as priests were discussed, Nicolios gave an overview of part time and voluntary work conducted by women in the diocese, and other women ministers presented on their work.

In 2002, Nicolios resigned and became rector of St John's in Diamond Creek, Melbourne. The Sydney diocese does not ordain women as priests, and this move was reportedly a surprise to the Sydney Anglicans including the new archbishop, Peter Jensen, as she had not been an activist for women's ordination. However Nicolios and the archbishop have said that she left Sydney on good terms.

In 2009 after the Black Saturday bushfires in Victoria, Nicolios managed local bushfire relief, counselling and support through St John's.

In April 2019, the 30th anniversary celebration of women's ordination into the diaconate was held at St Andrew’s Cathedral in Sydney. Most of the women ordained as deacons in 1989 attended, including Nicolios who gave the main address, preaching on 2 Timothy 4:1-8.

=== Positions held ===
- Late 1970s: Secondary school teacher of English and Greek and member, Board of Senior School Studies
- 1980s: Student, Moore Theological College obtaining a Bachelor of Theology
- 1983-1989: Parish sister, Annandale
- 1989: Ordained as deacon in Sydney Anglican diocese
- 1989-1991: Assistant minister, St Aidan's Annandale
- 1992-1993: Chaplain, Deaconess House
- 1998-2002: President, Australian Anglican Diaconal Association
- 1994–2002: Archdeacon for Women's Ministries, Anglican Diocese of Sydney
- 24 July 2002: Ordained priest at Holy Trinity, Doncaster, by Archbishop Peter Watson.
- 2002–2003: Priest-in-charge of St John's Anglican church, Diamond Creek parish, Victoria, appointed effective 26 July 2002.
- 2003-2013: Incumbent, Parish of St John's Diamond Creek with St Katherine's St Helena and St Michael's Yarrambat
- 2004-2010: Examining Chaplain, Archbishop of Melbourne
- 2013-2015: Permission to Officiate, Diocese of Melbourne
- 2003 (and 2007?): National chaplain, GFS Australia (formerly Girls Friendly Society).
- 2006-2010: Area Dean, Yarra/Plenty
- 2007: Member of the E-team, a group of current and former Sydney Anglican ministers formed to assist church leaders in mission and outreach.
- 2010-2013: Archdeacon of The Yarra.
- 2013–2015: Assistant Priest/Seniors' Minister, Parish of Kew, North Balwyn/St Hilary's and St Silas Anglican churches in Kew, Victoria.
- 2015: Retired and returned to Sydney.
- 2018–2019: A member of the Professional Standards Review Board for Kooyoora Ltd and Diocese of Melbourne.
- 2017-: Assistant Minister, Christ Church Lavender Bay, Sydney.
