= Elizabeth Alfred =

Australian Anglican deaconess

- Born: 10 January 1914
- Died: 2 February 2015 (aged 101); Melbourne, Australia

Ecclesiastical career
- Church: Anglican Church of Australia
- Ordained: 1986
- Congregations: St James', Dandenong
- Title: The Reverend

Elizabeth Alfred (10 January 1914 – 2 February 2015) was an Anglican priest in Melbourne, Australia. She was the first woman to be ordained as a priest in the Anglican Diocese of Melbourne, in 1992.

== Early life and education ==
Elizabeth Alfred was born on 10 January 1914. Her family often moved from place to place in the state of Victoria, and her father was a bank manager. From 1928 to 1929 she attended Girton Grammar School in Bendigo.

Alfred trained at Deaconess House in Melbourne, and in 1944 was placed at St Marks' Fitzroy.

== Career ==
After three years at Deaconess House, she transferred to the Mission of St John and St James in Dandenong. She was promoted to head deaconess in the Diocese of Melbourne; however, she was dissatisfied that as a woman she could not be ordained. She met ordained women overseas, in the United States and Canada, and raised the issue of women's ordinations with Frank Woods, Anglican Archbishop of Melbourne, without success. Nevertheless, she continued to campaign for change, often joined by close friend and ally Barbara Darling, who later became an assistant bishop in Melbourne.

In 1979, Alfred was appointed chaplain at the Royal Women's Hospital in Melbourne, the first woman to hold the position, and that year she was also given Permission to Officiate. In 1981 the Melbourne synod voted in favour of the ordination of women, and Alfred was one of a group of women who were ordained as deacons in 1986. She was ordained as a priest in 1992 by Archbishop Keith Rayner, although at 78 she was past the age of retirement; Rayner had promised Alfred that he would ordain her as a priest as soon as it became possible, regardless of time constraints. The day after her ordination, Alfred celebrated the Eucharist at St. James.

== Later life and death ==
Alfred presided at Holy Communion on her 100th birthday in 2014 at St James' Church in Dandenong. She died three weeks after her 101st birthday, on 2 February 2015, in Melbourne.

== Awards and honours ==
In 2001, Alfred was added to the Victorian Honour Roll of Women for her achievements as head deaconess and for being the first woman ordained as a priest in Melbourne.

== See also ==
- List of the first women ordained as priests in the Anglican Church of Australia in 1992
