= Church Standard =

Former Anglican newspaper in Australia

The Church Standard was a national Anglican newspaper based in Sydney, Australia, published from 1912 to 1952.

== History ==
The paper was the official newspaper of the Church of England in Australia, as the Anglican Church of Australia was then called. It was founded in 1912 by Montagu Stone-Wigg, who had resigned as Bishop of New Guinea in 1908, with the assistance of another Anglo-Catholic clergyman, the Rev William Hey Sharp, the former warden of St Paul's College. Stone-Wigg became the first editor. The paper was published by the Church Publishing Company. (Note: There had been an earlier, unrelated, publication called the Church Standard. That publication was previously called the Australian Record. From 1896 to 1901 it was called the Church Standard. Thereafter it was published as the Australian Churchman. Its editorial line was Evangelical.)

The editorial line of the Church Standard was strongly Anglo-Catholic. An Evangelical view was that the paper should be called the "Roman Church Standard".

Its political line was more liberal: it was an early opponent of the White Australia policy. The paper was strongly critical of the censorship of a speech to have been broadcast on the ABC by Judge Foster in 1938.

Under the editorship of the Rev G Stuart Watts (1934-1940), the paper took an ever more liberal line. Watts published articles by the radical Presbyterian theologian Samuel Angus and he himself wrote articles pleading for a more liberal interpretation of the Virgin Birth and the bodily Resurrection; these led to suggestions from churchmen in the Diocese of Sydney in 1937 that Watts should be charged with heresy. Nothing came of that, but the editorial line became unacceptable to the Bishops, and, in 1940, Watts was summarily dismissed.

The final editor was W. Basil Oliver, JP, who had previously been the Secretary of the publishing company; Oliver was acting editor after Watts was dismissed, and permanently appointed in 1942. An early editorial by Oliver proposed that St Mark be adopted as the patron saint of Australia, his feast day being 25 April, Anzac Day. (Oliver was the Australian correspondent for the American Episcopalian newspaper, The Living Church).

== The Anglican ==
By 1952 the Church Standard was "ailing", and, in an attempt to revive it, was re-named The Anglican. Its masthead stated that it incorporated the Church Standard; a number of diocesan newspapers were closed to support its viability.

== Editors ==
- The Rt Rev Montagu Stone-Wigg, 1912-1915.
- The Rev Charles Edward Curtis, 1915-1918.
- The Rev Dr William Charles Pritchard, 1918–1930.
- The Rev Frank Sturge Harty, 1930-1933.
- The Rev George Stuart Watts, 1933-1940.
- Walter Basil Oliver, 1942-1952.
