= Raymond Douglas Huish =

Sir Raymond Douglas Huish CBE (7 December 1898 – 26 January 1970) was an Australian returned soldier and ex-servicemen's leader, who served in World War I.

Huish is best known for being a state president of the Returned Services League from 1930 until 1967.

== Early life ==
Huish was born in Clifton, Bristol in England and after spending two years in the United States of America, he emigrated to Australia, settling in Rockhampton, Queensland in August 1910 with his parents Edward and Amelia Huish and three siblings, Stanley, Harold, Seymour and Elizabeth.

== War service ==
When World War I broke out, Huish enlisted in the Australian Imperial Force in 1915, despite being aged just 16. Huish faked his age by falsely claiming to recruitment officers to be 18 years of age. His two older brothers, Stanley and Harold also enlist but the youngest Huish brother Seymour Huish's attempted to enlist were initially unsuccessful. However, he was able to enlist later, and served on HMAS Australia.

At the time of his enlistment, Huish was employed in the Rockhampton office of merchants William Higson & Co. The company presented Huish with a wrist watch, a cheque and a guarantee that his position would remain his upon his return.

The three older brothers were drafted into the Light Horse Regiment, with Huish serving with his brother Harold in the 5th Light Horse Regiment.

Huish celebrated his 17th birthday while serving in Egypt and by his 18th birthday, he had seen action throughout the Middle East including in Egypt, Palestine, Syria and in the Sinai Desert.

On 5 August 1916, Huish was wounded in the Battle of Katia but later fully recovered, and in February 1917 was drafted into the 2nd Light Horse Brigade Signal Troop. Huish was involved in the advances through Palestine and Syria, before contracting malaria in the Jordan Valley.

Huish was promoted to corporal in March 1919, before he returned to Australia and discharged on 27 September 1919.

== Career ==
Upon his return to Australia, Huish travelled, finding a variety of jobs as he moved through the eastern state of Australia before eventually returning to Rockhampton where he found work with local machinery manufacturers, Sydney Williams & Co.

In 1923, Huish was inspired by fellow lighthorseman, Colonel Alexander Chisholm who came to Rockhampton from Gympie in an attempt to revive the local sub-branch of the Returned Sailors and Soldiers Imperial League of Australia and together, they successfully re-formed the branch. Initially just a member on the committee, Huish would become the vice-president of the Rockhampton sub-branch and a joint organising secretary of the first two Diggers' carnivals.

In 1927, Huish became the Rockhampton branch manager of machinery merchants, Buzacott's. His work with Buzacott's saw him quickly move up to become the Brisbane-based state manager for the company, and was its managing director by 1929.

Despite the move to Brisbane for his work, Huish continued his involvement with the RSL. Following the resignation of Hubert Fraser East in 1930, Huish became the state president.

As state president of the RSL, Huish frequently commented in the press on issues pertaining to the welfare of returned Australian Defence Force personnel, soldier settlement, the legacy of those killed during war, military training, national security, the threat of Communism in Australia, the proper use of the Australian flag and the way the press delivered the news.

In 1946, Huish was a witness at the inquiry into the administration of Australian Comfort Fund's Naval Leave House in Brisbane, where he was questioned over allegations of improper practices at the Australian Comforts Fund, specifically the acquirement of quotes to equip Naval Leave House with items from Buzacott's of which Huish was managing director, such as a public address system and a dance band amplifier. Huish was later completely exonerated, having been cleared of any wrongdoing or misconduct.

In 1950, Huish served as one of three commissioners of the Royal Commission into Golden Casket.

In October 1954, Huish officially opened the 47th conference of the Queensland Country Press Association where he publicly condemned what he perceived to be "sensationalism" of metropolitan newspapers while praising the way more conservative regional newspapers soberly presented themselves and for the way they had assisted the RSL's cause.

=== Four Corners controversy ===
In September 1963, Huish strongly condemned the Australian Broadcasting Commission for a Four Corners program in which he appeared. As acting national president of the RSL, Huish said the program falsely claimed RSL members and the community were being duped by senior RSL officials, and that the program had presented a "completely distorted" view of the RSL's activities.

Huish also criticised the ABC for appearing to heavily edit his comments during appearance on Four Corners while also accusing the program of completely omitting comments from both the president of the New South Wales branch of the RSL and the acting president of the RSL's Victorian branch who both agreed to appear on the program.

Following the program's broadcast, Huish said the RSL planned to make a "strong protest" to the ABC over the way the RSL's activities were depicted.

The ABC's general manager, Charles Moses, said that unless an inquiry is ordered by the Federal Government, the ABC had no statement to make about the Four Corners program. Moses also admitted to not having watched the show.

Australian Prime Minister, Sir Robert Menzies later said he had received complaints about Four Corners from RSL leaders and planned to examine the transcripts from the program when he returned from an overseas trip to Papua New Guinea.

Two weeks later, Huish said the RSL was planning to take legal action against the Church of England's newspaper The Anglican, which had published an editorial praising the Four Corners program. Huish said the RSL found the editorial to be "highly defamatory".

== Personal life ==
Huish married Hilda May Weber at Rockhampton's St Joseph's Cathedral on 1 November 1921.

The following year, Huish's younger brother Seymour died.

After his move to Brisbane, Huish appeared in Brisbane Traffic Court in 1930 where he was fined £5 for a speeding offence.

In 1954, Huish and his wife were the victims of a burglary. Thieves allegedly broke into Huish's home in St Lucia while Huish was at a conference in Ipswich but were disturbed when Lady Huish arrived home from a party with her daughter, prompting the alleged thieves to leap from a window to escape. The alleged thieves had ransacked the house in Hawken Drive, and allegedly stole £200 worth of jewellery and other items.

== Honours ==
Following the Coronation of George VI and Elizabeth, Huish was honoured in the 1937 Coronation Honours by being appointed a Commander of the British Empire, for services to Australian ex-servicemen.

Following the Coronation of Elizabeth II, Huish was honoured with in the 1953 Coronation Honours by being appointed a Knight Bachelor. At an investiture ceremony during her 1954 tour to Australia, Queen Elizabeth II bestowed Huish with his knighthood in person.

== Death ==
Huish died in Brisbane at the age of 72 on 26 January 1970, after having been admitted to St Helen's Hospital after suffering a heart attack.

== Legacy ==
A street which runs adjacent to the Fitzroy River in the Rockhampton suburb of Wandal has been named Sir Raymond Huish Drive. The street is notable for providing access to the 2nd World War Memorial Aquatic Centre, the John Leak War Memorial, Alf Kele Memorial Rotary Park and the Victoria Park sports precinct, which includes Hegvold Stadium, home of local QBL team, the Rockhampton Rockets.

Rockhampton Regional Council have erected a signboard beside the street featuring information about Huish, although it appears to have his enlistment age listed incorrectly as 18 in February 1916, despite Huish (who was born in December 1898) himself stating a number of times throughout his life that he was only aged 16 when he enlisted.
