= Women and the Church =

Church of England organisation

Women and the Church (WATCH) is a group of women and men who have been campaigning for gender equality (and especially for the ordination of women as bishops) in the Church of England. The group was initially created during the 1990s as London WATCH in order to ensure the acceptance of female priests in the Church of England. The organization traces its origins to the Movement for the Ordination of Women, which campaigned for the ordination of women as priests in the Church of England, and remains active in campaigning as of 2024 on the grounds that women are "not yet equal" within the Church of England.

In 2021, WATCH reported that despite a higher proportion of ordinands being female than male, roughly 70 percent of clergy in a stipendiary post (paid by the church) were male.

In May 2025, the organisation launched a campaign to abolish the provision set out in a House of Bishops Declaration to provide both pastorally and sacramentally for those theologically opposed to receiving the ministry of female priests or bishops. The organisation also encouraged women clergy to log any instances of harassment or discrimination, with an aim to using this to bring a case under the Equality Act (2010).
