= John Fleming (Australian priest) =

Australian priest and bioethicist

The Reverend John Fleming
- Born: 12 June 1943 (age 83); Port Lincoln, South Australia, Australia
- Education: University of Adelaide; Australian College of Theology; Griffith University
- Spouse: Alison
- Children: 3
- Parent(s): Thomas Robert and Gwenda May Fleming
- Years active: 1970 – present

Ecclesiastical career
- Religion: Christian
- Church: Anglican (1970-1987); Roman Catholic (1995-)
- Ordained: 1970 (Anglican); 1995 (Roman Catholic)
- Congregations: St. Nicholas Church, Chiswick; Church of the Good Shepherd, Plympton

John Irving Fleming is an Australian priest and bioethicist. He was the founding president of Campion College. Fleming was originally an Anglican priest but later became a Roman Catholic priest. He is currently suspended from public ministry and is living in retirement in South Australia.

== Early career and background ==
The son of an Anglican priest, Fleming graduated with a BA from the University of Adelaide, a Licentiate in Theology from the Australian College of Theology and a PhD in philosophy and bioethics from Griffith University. His PhD thesis was titled "Human rights and natural law : an analysis of the consensus gentium and its implications for bioethics".

== Career ==
Fleming was a high-profile Anglo-Catholic priest in the Anglican Church of Australia's Adelaide diocese. He was ordained in 1970. In the early 1970s, he was a university chaplain and priest in charge of St Paul's Church in Adelaide and dean and vice-master of St Mark's College at the University of Adelaide. From 1977 to 1978, he was assistant curate at St. Nicholas Church, Chiswick, in West London; and from 1978 to 1987 was the rector of the Church of the Good Shepherd, Plympton, in Adelaide.

He became a Roman Catholic in 1987. Although married with three children, he was given a papal dispensation permitting his ordination in the Catholic Church in 1995. As a Roman Catholic layperson, from 1987 to 1995, he was the founding director of the Southern Cross Bioethics Institute. As a Roman Catholic priest, he continued as director of the institute from 1995 to 2004; from 2001 he was also a faculty member of the John Paul II Institute for Marriage and Family. He was the founding president of Campion College from 2004 to 2009.

Fleming was an adjunct professor of bioethics at the Southern Cross Bioethics Institute until its closure in 2012. He served on a number of bioethics boards including as a foundation member of UNESCO's International Bioethics Committee (1992-1996). From 13 July 1996 to 13 July 2016, he was a corresponding member of the Pontifical Academy for Life. Fleming was a member of the SA Council on Reproductive Technology (1998-2004) and a member from 2002 of the Gene Technology Ethics Committee set up under the Australian Gene Technology Act 2000.

Fleming was a weekly columnist of The Advertiser in Adelaide and presented radio programs for a number of years. He campaigned against the ordination of women in the Anglican church during that time and debated Patricia Brennan, then Convenor of the Movement for the Ordination of Women, on television in 1985. In 2005, while president of Campion College in Sydney, he hosted a short-lived talkback radio program on 2UE.

== Community ==
Fleming was an elected delegate to the 1998 Australian Constitutional Convention associated with Australians for Constitutional Monarchy. In 2003, he was appointed by the Howard government to the council of the National Museum of Australia with his term ending in 2009.

== Personal ==
Fleming is married to Alison and they have three children.

== Allegations of abuse ==
Five years after his appointment to Campion College, media reports were published alleging sexual impropriety by Fleming with three people when he was an Anglican priest some 37 years previously. Nigel Hunt, a journalist for The Advertiser and Sunday Mail, wrote that these allegations were known to the Roman Catholic Archbishop of Adelaide, the Most Reverend Leonard Faulkner, at the time of his Roman Catholic ordination.

In 2011, Fleming returned to Adelaide where he continued to work as a priest. He initiated a defamation case against the Sunday Mail regarding several stories published on the complaints and investigations. These matters had been finalised by SA Police and by the Catholic Church. The Anglican Church ceased investigations on 24 November 2020.

From 7 October 2014 and the end of September 2016, Fleming pursued a high profile, but unsuccessful, defamation action against The Advertiser and the Sunday Mail in the Supreme Court of South Australia regarding reports of alleged sexual misconduct as an Anglican priest.

Fleming appealed against the dismissal of the claim for damages for defamation to the Full Court of the Supreme Court of South Australia. On 29 September 2016 the appeal was unanimously dismissed when the court found no errors of law were made in the earlier judgement. Costs were awarded against him.

Fleming applied for special leave to appeal with the High Court of Australia, the application was refused because two judges stated that it did "not raise a question of general importance. None of the applicant's proposed appeal grounds enjoys sufficient prospects of success to warrant a grant of special leave. Special leave should be refused with costs."

It was decreed under canon law on 9 February 2017 by Philip Marshall, vicar general of the Catholic Archdiocese of Adelaide, that Fleming was to immediately cease all forms of ministry. The decision was later criticised by David Flint in The Spectator and Augusto Zimmermann in Quadrant, they both state judicial failures and comment on the relevance of the Briginshaw principle to the decision.

In June 2021, Fleming lost an appeal against the denial of a clearance to work with children following a Working With Children Check heard by the South Australian Civil & Administrative Tribunal.

== Bibliography ==
- Fleming, John Irving (1977), Father John's Response: answers to questions, Christian Television Association
- —— (1986), Religious Decline and its Consequences Seminar on the Sociology of Culture, Lecture delivered at La Trobe University, Bundoora, Victoria 3 June 1986
- —— (1987). "To the Intent that these Orders May Be Continued". In Wetherell, David (ed.). Women Priests in Australia? The Anglican Crisis. Spectrum Publications. pp. 82–103.
- —— (1995). "The Family and the Bioethics of Fragmentation". In Trujillo, Alfonso López; Sgreccia, Elio (eds.). Famiglia Cuore Della Civilità Dell'Amore. Città del Vaticano: Libreria Editrice Vaticana.
- ——; Fundacion Banco Bilbao Vizcaya; Catedra Interuniversitaria Fundacion BBVA-Diputacion Foral de Bizkaia de Derecho y Genoma Humano (1996), Ethics and the Human Genome Diversity Project, Fundacion Banco Bilbao Vizcaya (BBV Foundation)
- —— (1996), Ethical Implications in the Human Genome Diversity Project, vol. 2, International Bioethics Committee of UNESCO Proceedings of the Third Session September 1995
- —— (1996). "I Cattolici Messi di Fronte Alle Strategie Pro-Eutanasia e Pro-Aborto". Medicina e Morale. 1: 101–120.
- ——; Hains, Michael G (1997). "What Rights If Any Do The Unborn Have Under International Law". Australian Bar Review. 16 (2): 181–198.
- —— (2000). "Death, Dying, and Euthanasia: Australia Versus The Northern Territory". Issues in Law & Medicine. 15 (3): 291–305. PMID 10758701.
- —— (2000). "Euthanasia Today and Euthanasia in Nazi Germany – Similarities and Dissimilarities". Bioethics Research Notes. 12 (1): 1–2.
- ——; Pike, Gregory Kym; Ewing, Selena; Southern Cross Bioethics Institute (2002), Human embryos : a limitless scientific resource? : what the Research Involving Embryos and Prohibition of Human Cloning Bill 2002 really allows (1st ed.), Southern Cross Bioethics Institute, ISBN 978-0-9581526-0-0
- —— (2003). "The Code and the Guide – Practical Instruments for Practical People". Res Publica. 12 (1): 16–19.
- —— (2003), The draft Mental Incapacity Bill: will it help patients and protect the vulnerable? A Commentary, SPUC (UK)
- —— (2003). "Euthanasia by Omission in Australia: What the Parliament Does not Allow, the Courts Allow". Bioethics Research Notes. 15 (2): 1–4.
- —— (2004), Infertility in the Republic of Ireland: An Australian Perspective, European Life Network
- ——; Ewing, Selena (2005), Give Women Choice: Australia Speaks on Abortion, Southern Cross Bioethics Institute, ISBN 978-0-9581526-1-7
- ——; Tonti-Filippini, Nicholas (2007), Common ground?: seeking an Australian consensus on abortion and sex education, St Pauls Publications, ISBN 978-1-921032-64-6
- —— (2007). "A Critique of Birmingham's Sex Education". Faith. 39 (5): 18–25.
- —— (Summer 2009). "Is Trade in Human Body Parts Intrinsically wrong?". National Catholic Bioethics Quarterly Summer: 253–261.
- —— (2010), Convinced by the truth: embracing the fullness of Catholic faith, Connor Court Publishing, ISBN 978-1-921421-11-2
- —— (October 2012), Dignitas Personae Explained: The Church's teaching on reproductive and related technologies, Connor Court Publishing (published 2010), ISBN 978-1-921421-51-8
- 2 (ed English edition) (2014), Manual of Catholic Medical Ethics, Connor Court Publishing
- —— (2016), Laudato Si': A Critique, Modotti Press
- —— (2021), To Kill or Not to Kill?: Euthanasia in a Society with a Cultural Death Wish 2021, Austin McAuley Press (UK) in press
- Heng Leng, Chee; El-Hamamsy, Laila; Fleming, John Irving; Fujiki, Norio; Keyeux, Genoveva; Knoppers, Bartha Maria; Macer, Darryl (1996). "Bioethics and Human Population Genetics Research". International Bioethics Committee of UNESCO Proceedings of the Third Session September 1995. 1.
- Krohn, Anna M; Fleming, John Irving (4 August 1994), Genetics & Ethics, Southern Cross Bioethics Institute (published 1994), ISBN 978-0-646-19012-9
- Overduin, Daniel Christiaan; Fleming, John Irving (1980), Wake Up! Lucky Country, Lutheran Publishing House
- Overduin, Daniel Christiaan; Fleming, John Irving (1982), Life in a test-tube: medical and ethical issues facing society today, Lutheran Publishing House ISBN, ISBN 978-0-85910-203-2
- Tonti-Filippini, Nicholas; Fleming, John Irving; Walsh, Mary (2004). "The Principle of Autonomy, Human Dignity, and Nutrition and Hydration for the Patient Who is Persistently Unresponsive". The Human Life Review. XXX (1): 83–109.
- Tonti-Filippini, Nicholas; Fleming, John Irving; Pike, Greg; Campbell, Ray (2006). "Ethics and Human-Animal Transgenesis". The National Catholic Bioethics Quarterly. 6 (4): 689–704. doi:10.5840/ncbq2006648.
