= Colleen O'Reilly =

Australian Anglican priest

Venerable Colleen O'Reilly AM
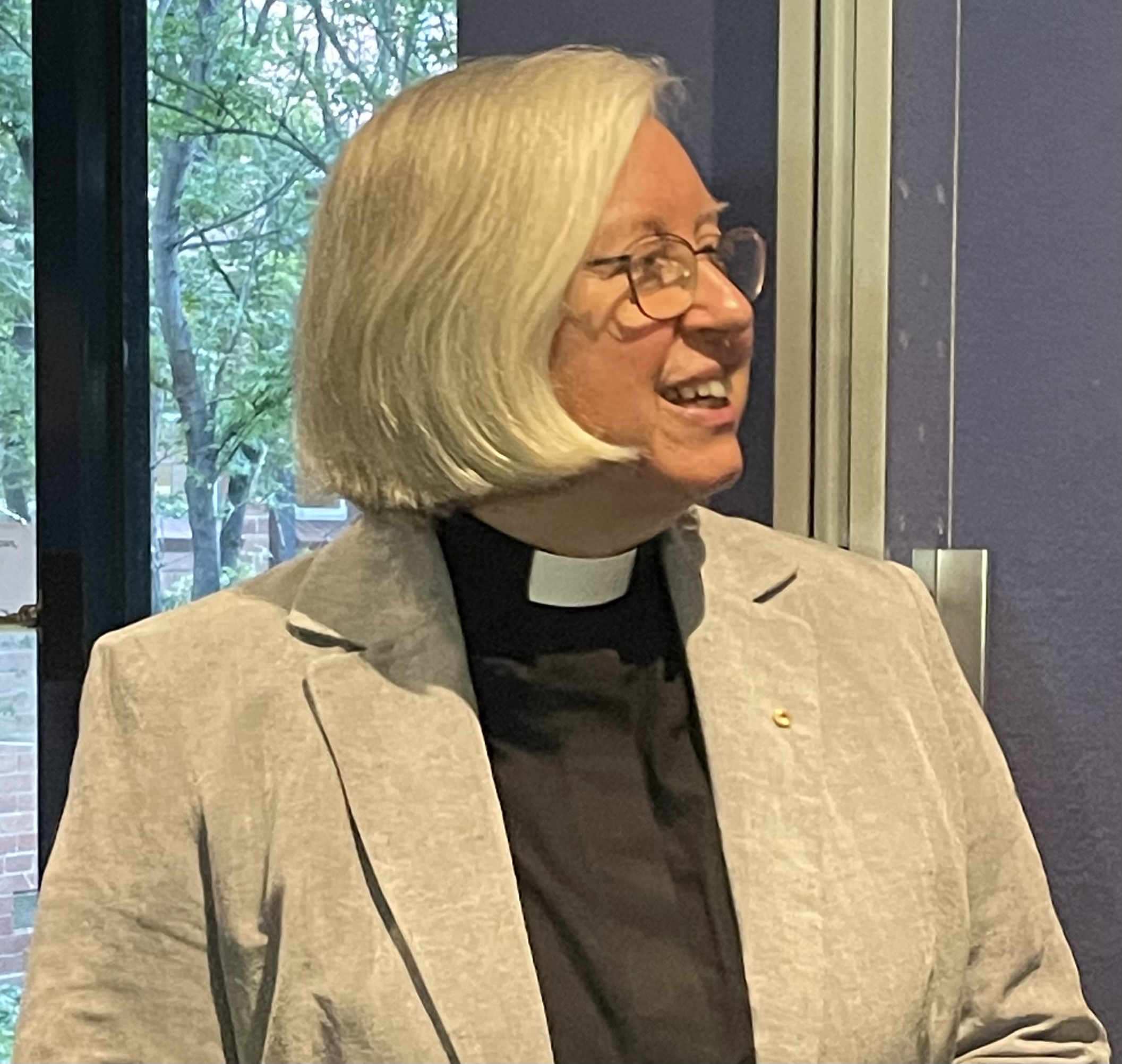
- Venerable Dr Colleen O’Reilly AM
- Church: Anglican Church of Australia
- Other posts: Archdeacon, Stonnington and Canon, St Paul's Cathedral

Orders
- Ordination: 1995

Personal details
- Born: 1949 (age 76–77) Sydney

Colleen Anne O'Reilly AM (born 1949) is an Australian Anglican priest. She was made a Member of the Order of Australia in 2021 in recognition of her significant service to the Anglican Church of Australia, and to religious education. O'Reilly has been a strong advocate for women's leadership in the Anglican Church and women's ordination since the 1970s and described by Muriel Porter as "the ‘mother' of the movement that was a key factor in bringing about the ordination of women through many years of determined struggle".

== Life and career ==
O'Reilly was born in 1949 and grew up in Sydney, Australia. During the 1970s she became a pioneer in the push for women's ordination and has been a leader in the movement ever since. She worked alongside other feminist advocates such as Patricia Brennan and co-founded the journal Women-Church with former Catholic nun Erin White.

O'Reilly was actively involved in the ecumenical Commission on the Status of Women which was established by the Australian Council of Churches. Desiring something more distinctly Anglican in focus, she and Zandra Wilson became the key founding members of Anglican Women Concerned, which was established in Sydney in 1975.

O'Reilly completed a Doctor of Ministry thesis from the San Francisco Theological Seminary in 1996 Having graduated with a PhD in theology, O'Reilly helped train men for the priesthood, teaching at the United Theological College in Parramatta in the Anglican Diocese of Sydney. She was not able to be ordained in the Sydney diocese because it does not accept the ordination of women as priests.

She moved to Melbourne to take up the position of Associate Dean and Director of Ministry Studies at the Melbourne College of Divinity, now the University of Divinity, a role she held from 1994 to 1999. The move to Melbourne made ordination possible and O'Reilly was ordained deacon in 1995 and priest in the same year.

During a sermon she preached in 2012, celebrating 20 years since Elizabeth Alfred became the first woman ordained in Victoria (Australia), O'Reilly recalled the first time she saw a woman priest. Margaret Marsh came 'from a place of almost mythical advancement - New Zealand. "Watching Ms Marsh, vested as a priest, join the procession to the altar", O'Reilly said "it strongly came to me, it really is OK to be a woman"'

As a member of the Melbourne synod she played a leading role on the committee on women in the episcopate. O'Reilly was one of 25 signatories across Australia who petitioned the church's appellate court to consider women bishops. When the appellate tribunal decided in 2007, by a 4-3 majority, that there was no constitutional barrier to women becoming bishops in the Australian church, O'Reilly stated that "It means that in choosing bishops in the future the church has access to the complete pool of clergy available, and not to just some of them, that the gifts of women are now available at every level in the church, and that's good."

O'Reilly was vicar of St Faith's Burwood, from 1999 to 2007 and was the vicar of St George's Malvern from 2007 until her retirement in 2019. She was a canon of St Paul's Cathedral, Melbourne, from 2001 to 2017 and Archdeacon of Stonnington from 2017. She has been a member of various church bodies in the Anglican Diocese of Melbourne as well as nationally and internationally, including Chaplain, General Synod Standing Committee 2007 to 2014. At the end of 2021, she retired from her role as chaplain of Trinity College, Melbourne and continues as an adjunct lecturer at Trinity College Theological School.

== Awards and honours ==
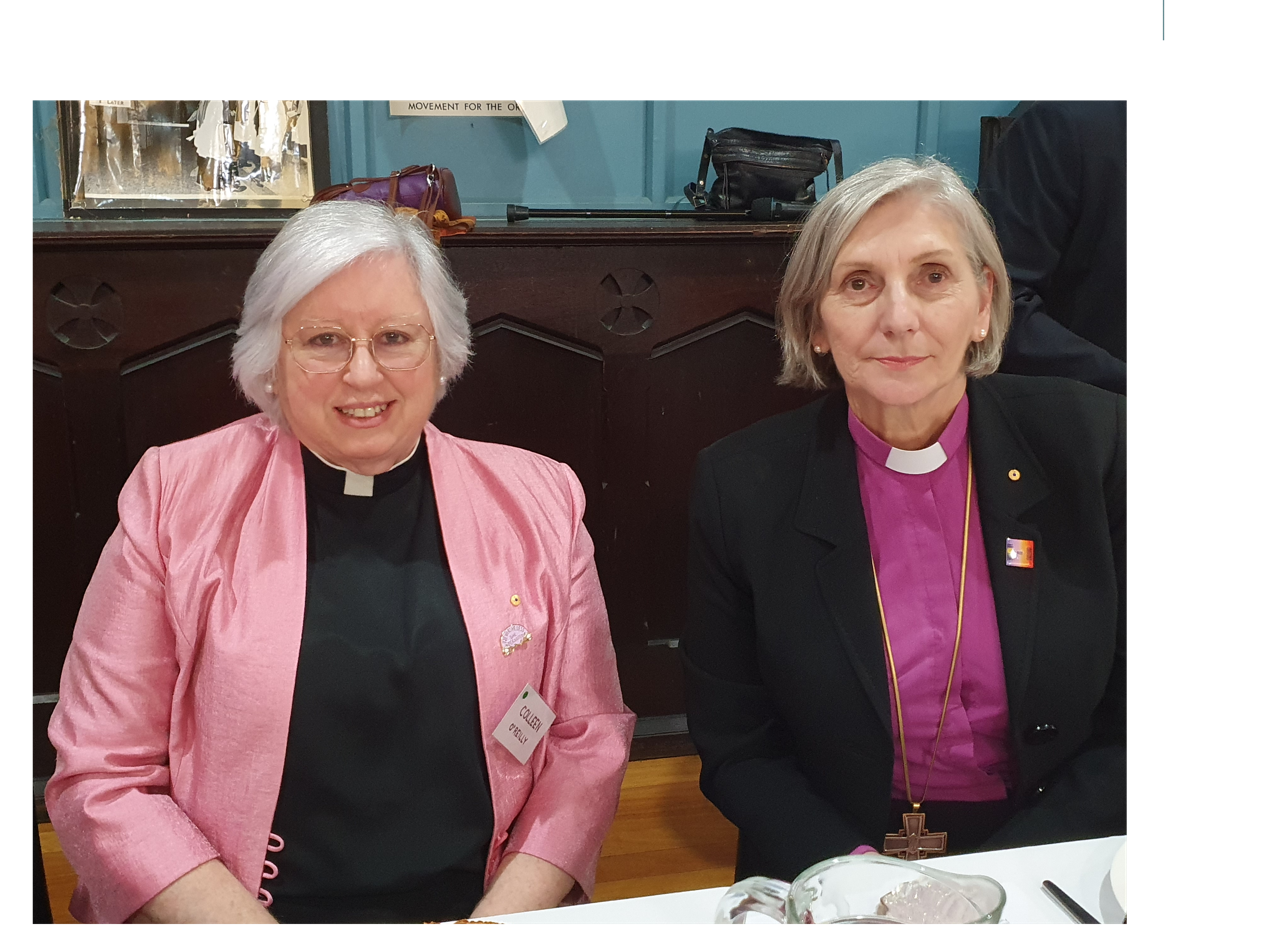
Colleen O'Reilly with Kay Goldsworthy at the celebration of the 40th anniversary of the Movement for the Ordination of Women

O'Reilly's leadership in the church was acknowledged in her invitation to preach at the service commemorating 20 years of women's ordination in Melbourne in 2012. On 17 September 2023, the Movement for the Ordination of Women (MOW) held its 40th-anniversary celebrations at Christ Church St Laurence, Sydney. After the church service at which Kay Goldsworthy preached, O'Reilly gave the Dr Patricia Brennan AM Lecture, in honour of the founding National President of MOW.

She was recognised as a Member in the General Division of the Order of Australia (AM) on 26 January 2021 for significant service to the Anglican Church of Australia and to religious education.

== Select publications ==
- O'Reilly, Colleen. "A Personal Response to Women Church 21st Edition", Women-Church: Australian Journal of Feminist Studies in Religion, no. 21 (1997): 28-29. Digitised version of no. 21 (1997) available on JSTOR Open Community Collections, University of Divinity Digital Collections, Mannix Library
- O'Reilly, Colleen. "Juggling Confetti: managing the household of God", Women-Church: Australian Journal of Feminist Studies in Religion, no. 40 (2007): 53–56. Digitised version of no. 40 (2007) available on JSTOR Open Community Collections, University of Divinity Digital Collections, Mannix Library
