= Movement for the Ordination of Women (newsletter) =

Australian newsletter

- Discipline: Ordination of women
- Language: English

Publication details
- History: 1984–1997
- Frequency: Semiannual

Standard abbreviations
- ISO 4: Mov. Ordination Women

Indexing
- ISSN: 1035-5944
- OCLC no.: 216488950

Links
- Movement for the Ordination of Women (newsletter) on JSTOR Open Community Collections

The Movement for the Ordination of Women was an Australian newsletter published by the Movement for the Ordination of Women (Sydney, NSW). The newsletter, which had multiple title variations over the years, was produced between 1984 and 1997, and provides a record of the history of the movement.

== Australian MOW history ==
The Australian Movement for the Ordination of Women (MOW) was founded in 1983 to advocate for the ordination of women as deacons, priests and bishops in the Anglican Church of Australia. Initially started in Sydney, the group soon expanded to become a national organisation with regional groups located around the country.

The first ordination of women as priests in the Anglican Church of Australia occurred in 1992. The Anglican Diocese of Sydney continues to oppose the ordination of women as priests (or presbyters) and bishops, although it has ordained women as deacons since 1989.

== Australian MOW publications ==
The publications produced by the Australian Movement for the Ordination of Women record the history of the various debates and challenges faced by the movement, as well as reporting general news and activities of the MOW regional groups.

The titles of MOW publications often changed over the years. This makes it difficult to distinguish between different publications and to create an accurate list of all issues produced. Most issues of the Movement for the Ordination of Women newsletter lacked a distinctive title and just included the name of the movement. Some issues have the subtitle: Newsletter and some issues for 1987-1988 were titled: Sydney newsletter.

The National magazine of the Movement for the Ordination of Women was also titled MOW national magazine and Magazine: the National magazine of the Movement for the Ordination of Women. Balaam's Ass, which was produced by MOW (Sydney, NSW), was also incorporated into the national magazine in the December 1990 and May 1991 issues.

Mannix Library, in East Melbourne has digitised twenty-four issues of the MOW (National) Newsletter (1984-1997) and made them available on the University of Divinity's Digital Collections website and on JSTOR Open Community Collections. The Movement for the Ordination of Women website also provides access to the first MOW national newsletter which it notes was published in April 1985.
