= Janet Scarfe =

Australian academic and historian

- Born: Janet Scarfe; 1947 (age 78–79)

Academic work
- Discipline: History
- Sub-discipline: Movement for the Ordination of Women
- Institutions: Macquarie University
- Notable works: Preachers, Prophets & Heretics : Anglican Women's Ministry (2012)

Janet Scarfe (born 1947) is an Australian academic and historian who was very involved with the Movement for the Ordination of Women (MOW) in Australia.

== Early life and career ==
Scarfe was born in 1947.

Her research interests include pioneering professional women, specifically Australian army nurses serving in World War I and World War II and the first generation of women clergy in the Anglican Church in Australia.

In 2008, Scarfe commenced as an Adjunct Research Associate at Monash University.

In 2015, Scarfe curated an exhibition sponsored by the East Melbourne Historical Society titled Gone to War as Sister: East Melbourne Nurses in the Great War.

== Movement for the Ordination of Women ==
The Australian Movement for the Ordination of Women (MOW) was founded in 1983 to advocate for the ordination of women as deacons, priests and bishops in the Anglican Church of Australia.

Patricia Brennan was the founding national President. Janet Scarfe succeeded Brennan in 1989. Scarfe was the president of the Movement for the Ordination of Women in Australia from 1989 to 1995.

In 2012, Scarfe co-edited and was a contributor to the monograph, Preachers, Prophets and Heretics: Anglican Women's Ministry, with Elaine Lindsay. The publication was a collection of essays that documented the controversy surrounding the ordination of women in the Anglican Church of Australia in the 1980s and 1990s.

Scarfe also contributed articles to Women-Church: an Australian journal of feminist studies in religion, including an article in the journal's final issue that documented a history of the movement for ordination of women in the Anglican Church.

Scarfe's papers, including the records of the Movement for the Ordination of Women Australia, are housed at the State Library of South Australia.

== Selected works ==
=== Books ===
- Lindsay, Elaine, and Janet Scarfe. Preachers, Prophets and Heretics: Anglican Women's Ministry. University of New South Wales Press Ltd, 2012. ISBN 9781742233376
- Scarfe, Janet; Scarfe, Suzanne (22 February 2021), The Campbells of Anlaby, 1860-1940, Janet Scarfe, ISBN 9780648938804

=== Journal articles ===
- Scarfe, Janet. “Mixed Fortunes: The Postwar Lives of East Melbourne’s Great War Nurses.” Victorian Historical Journal 88, no. 2 (2017): 256–280.
- Scarfe, Janet. “Changed Rules, Changing Culture? The Ordination of Women.” St Mark's Review 228, no. 228 (2014): 51–58.
- Scarfe, Janet. “Journeying Together on the Freedom Bus [History of the Movement for Ordination of Women in the Anglican Church.].” Women-Church: An Australian Journal of Feminist Studies in Religion no. 40 (2007): 47–51. https://search.informit.org/doi/10.3316/ielapa.200709492 Digitised version of no. 40 (2007) available on JSTOR Open Community Collections University of Divinity Digital Collections, Mannix Library.
- Scarfe, Janet. “Necessary, but Not Sufficient [the Ordination of Women in the Anglican Church Has Not Produced the Anticipated Transformation of the Church, and Sexism and Clericalism Still Prevail.].” Eureka Street 6, no. 2 (1996): 29–31.
