= Mary Maria Andrews =

Anglican missionary and Deaconess

Mary Andrews AM
- Born: 20 March 1915; Adaminaby, New South Wales
- Died: 16 October 1996 (aged 81); Kogarah, New South Wales
- Occupations: Anglican Deaconess, missionary and church leader

Mary Andrews AM (20 March 1915 – 16 October 1996) was an Anglican Deaconess, missionary and church leader.

== Early life ==
Mary Maria Andrews was born 20 March 1915 at Adaminaby, New South Wales, Australia. From an early age she developed a calling to missionary work. In 1936 she received a diploma from the Missionary and Bible Training College in Croydon, New South Wales and was accepted by the Church Missionary Society for training for mission work in China. She completed further training at the Church of England Deaconess House in Sydney.

== Missionary service and ordination ==
Andrews commenced missionary service with the Church Missionary Society in China in 1938 in the midst of war, and was put in charge of a girls' boarding school in Zhejiang Province. In 1945 she was briefly sent to Lahore, India, before returning to Australia in 1946. The following year she returned once more, first to teach in the Shaoxing region of China, and then to run her own parish. She was ordained in 1950 as a deacon, following the practice of the local Anglican Church to ordain women as deacons rather than deaconesses.

== Australian ministry ==
In 1951 Andrews was evacuated from China to Australia. In 1952 Archbishop Howard Mowll appointed her Head Deaconess in the Anglican Diocese of Sydney and later that year she was elected by the Deaconesses as Principal of Deaconess House. As such she was the most senior woman in the Diocese for the next two decades.

== Later years and death ==
Andrews retired as Head Deaconess and Principal in 1975 but continued to exercise ministerial roles and to visit China. In 1980 she was made a Member of the Order of Australia (AM) for service to religion. She died 16 October 1996 at Kogarah, New South Wales. In 1997 Deaconess House was renamed Mary Andrews College in her honour.
