= Montagu Stone-Wigg =

Montagu John Stone-Wigg (1861–1918) was an Anglican Colonial Bishop.

== Early life ==
He was born on 4 October 1861, the son of John Stone Wigg and his wife Ellen Matilda (née Clements). He was educated at Winchester and University College, Oxford.

== Religious life ==
Ordained in 1885, after curacies in Westminster Hammersmith he went to Brisbane in 1889 to be the Sub dean of St John's cathedral. Two years later he became a Canon and in 1898 he became the inaugural Bishop of New Guinea.

He received the degree Doctor of Divinity (DD) honoris causa from the University of Oxford in October 1902. He retired as Bishop of New Guinea in 1908. In 1912 he founded, and was the first editor of, the national Anglican newspaper, the Church Standard.

== Later life ==
He died on 16 October 1918.

Religious titles
Preceded by Inaugural appointment	Bishop of New Guinea; 1898–1908	Succeeded by Gerald Sharp
