= Anglican Women Concerned =

Australian Anglican feminist organisation

- Abbreviation: AWC
- Founded: 1975
- Location: Sydney
- Region served: Australia
- Key people: Founders, Colleen O'Reilly, Zandra Wilson

Anglican Women Concerned was the first Anglican feminist activist group in Australia that was founded in Sydney in 1975 by Colleen O'Reilly and Zandra Wilson. It was the first group in Australia that advocated for the ordination of women in the Anglican Church.

== History ==
Anglican Women Concerned arose from the ecumenical organisation, Christian Women Concerned, which had been established in 1968. Colleen O'Reilly had been actively involved in the ecumenical Commission on the Status of Women which was established by the Australian Council of Churches. Desiring something more distinctly Anglican in focus, O'Reilly and Zandra Wilson became the organisation's key founding members. Anglican Women Concerned was one of several Australian state-based groups that supported the ordination of women, which existed prior to the establishment of the Movement for the Ordination of Women (MOW) in Sydney in 1983.

Anglican Women Concerned was known for organising public protests outside important church assemblies, such as general synods and diocesan synods. In 1977 the group organised a demonstration outside St Andrew's Cathedral during a general synod. An article about the protest appeared on the front page of the Sydney Morning Herald.
