= Patricia Brennan (missionary) =

Australian doctor and missionary (1944–2011)

- Born: Patricia Wilkinson; 15 April 1944
- Died: 6 March 2011 (aged 66)
- Occupation: Physician
- Known for: Advocate for women's ordination
- Awards: Order of Australia; Bicentennial Women of Achievement

Patricia Anne Brennan AM (15 April 1944 – 6 March 2011) was an Australian medical doctor and a prominent campaigner for the ordination of women in the Anglican Church of Australia. She became a member of the Order of Australia in 1993.

== Early life and education ==
Patricia Anne Wilkinson was born on 15 April 1944 in Hurstville, New South Wales, Australia. Her father, George Wilkinson, worked as a compositor, and her mother, Eileen Nugent, worked in hospital as a matron. Wilkinson was one of three daughters born to the family. Her parents were Anglican and she was herself drawn to the faith at an early age. As a young woman, she attended St. George's High School, where she learned to debate.

She completed medical studies at the University of Sydney in 1968, having been awarded a Commonwealth scholarship. Over the next two years, she completed a required internship and residency in hospital settings.

Later in her life, Brennan studied medical anthropology at the University of Newcastle, completing a Doctor of Philosophy degree in 2001. Because of her interest in women's health and the need to provide medical support to survivors of rape, she completed additional degrees in medical forensics, earning her bachelor's degree in 2003 and a master's degree in forensic medicine in 2005.

== Career ==
Wilkinson was interested in serving as a medical missionary. After completing her residencies, she worked for the Société Internationale Missionnaire, or SIM as it is more commonly known, a missionary organization that ran several hospitals in Africa. Working as a physician and surgeon, she first was stationed in Jos, Nigeria at the Sudan Interior Mission Hospital, and then in Galmi, Niger, at the surgical and obstetric hospital.

Prior to leaving for Africa, Wilkinson had met Robert Brennan, a fellow Anglican, when they were both working as counsellors at a mission program for the Anglican church. The couple married in 1971 and moved to Nigeria. Upon her marriage, she adopted her husband's last name. She continued working as a physician with SIM; her husband taught mathematics.

Upon their return to Australia, in 1973, Brennan took up a position as registrar in hematology at the Prince of Wales hospital in Sydney. She also continued to be involved in mission work, supporting the Sudan Interior Mission as a general practitioner consultant. Four years later, she established a private practice as a physician in the suburb of Summer Hill.

Brennan increasing became involved in advocating for the public health needs of women, particularly around the prevention of sexual violence and support for survivors. She was the medical director for a Sexual Assault Service that served the Liverpool and Fairfield areas in New South Wales, and was the first forensic medical specialist at the Royal Prince Alfred Hospital in Sydney, where she worked with survivors of sexual assault. She believed that forensic medicine could provide better evidence for the prosecution of sexual assault cases. She also worked as an assistant medical director in a breast diagnostic center in Sydney, and was a lecturer at the University of Sydney.

Brennan was also a commentator on radio and television programs, particularly on topics related to religion, in the 80s and 90s.

== Movement for the Ordination of Women ==
After her return to Australia, Brennan observed the stark contrast between the independence she had as a medical practitioner and a missionary working in Africa, and the more limited role she was expected to play as a wife in Sydney's Anglican church culture. Despite having a medical degree and background in mission work, she felt she was treated primarily as "somebody's wife". Frustration over the differences between what she had accomplished in Africa and what she was expected to do at home led her to question the limitations women faced in the church in Australia.

At the time, the Anglican Church of Australia had an order of deaconess for women, but the clerical roles of deacon and priest were reserved for men only. The debate over women's ordination in the Anglican Communion had been growing since the 1970s, after the Episcopal Church in the United States first ordained women priests in 1974. The Sydney diocese was one of the most restrictive on the issue of women's leadership within the Anglican Church in Australia; in 1976, it became the only diocese in the country to restrict the role of churchwarden, the highest lay leadership position in a local church, to men only.

In 1982, Brennan was appointed to a diocesan committee that had been formed to study the question of women's ministry. As part of her work on the committee, she conducted a survey of 80 women in the Sydney diocese who were active in parish work and found that the majority favoured the ordination of women. She shared her findings with the committee but found her opinions were not welcomed.

In 1983, she helped launch the Movement for the Ordination of Women (MOW) in Sydney. A similar movement had been founded in England in 1979 advocating for the ordination of women in the Church of England. Through her leadership in the Australian organisation, Brennan became a visible and outspoken advocate for women's ordination within the Anglican Church of Australia. In addition to Brennan, key leaders in the movement included Colleen O'Reilly Stewart (co-founder of Anglican Women Concerned), Eileen Baldry and Ruth Sturmey Jones.

In an homage to Martin Luther's historic act of nailing theses to the door of a church in Wittenburg, Germany, one of the first actions taken by MOW was to gluel twelve theses on the door to the chapter house at Sydney's Anglican cathedral, St Andrew's. Three women, including Stewart, conducted the protest dressed in albs, a garment worn by priests when leading services. They timed the event to coincide with the start of the Anglican Church in Australia's general synod, which was being held in Sydney.

While it started in Sydney, MOW grew to become a national organisation, with chapters in Melbourne, Canberra and Perth. Brennan became the first national president and was vocal in urging for greater opportunities for women in the Anglican Church in Australia. An articulate and dynamic speaker, she travelled widely to speak at conferences and public events. She was frequently quoted in media coverage on the topic of women and the church in Australia, gaining her both acclaim and notoriety as a feminist Christian. Criticized and mocked by more conservative church leaders for her progressive views, she was once depicted in a cartoon as holding an AK-47 and standing over the dead body of a male priest. Others viewed her as an inspiration and a role model for women. In 1985, she participated in a debate about women's ordination with the Revd John Fleming on a program called Pressure Point aired on the Australian Broadcasting Company television network. According to historian Anne O'Brien, she earned a substantial amount of public support for women's ordination as a result of her strong debate performance.

Brennan believed that women drew their calling for the priesthood from God, despite the church's unwillingness to recognise these vocations. In a 1987 article in the Canberra Times, she is quoted as saying "We are women. We have authority given by God, whether the Church likes it or not, and when the Church isn't doing the right thing by women - and men too because of it - we take that authority upon ourselves without being given it."

Brennan also established the Australian Feminist Theology Foundation and took a leading role in organising two national feminist theology conferences, held in 1988 and 1991.

In 1986, women were allowed to be ordained as deacons in the Anglican Church in Australia and the first female priests were ordained in Perth in 1992. A compromise was accepted by the general synod that same year that allowed individual diocese the freedom to ordain women as priests, but did not require all to do so. Additional ordinations of women were held in 1992 in Melbourne and other dioceses. Yet, despite the increasing acceptance of women's ordination in other parts of the country, Brennan's home diocese of Sydney continued to refuse to ordain women priests.

Leaders from MOW, including Brennan, attended the Lambeth Conference in England in 1988, where women's ordination was once more discussed. In 1992, the Church of England accepted women into the priesthood.

Brennan eventually ceased attending Anglican services in the Diocese of Sydney due to its unwillingness to include women in the leadership of the church and in the ranks of the clergy.

== Personal life ==
Patricia and Rob Brennan married in 1971. They had three children: Kate, Peter and James.

== Honours ==
In 1987, Brennan was recognized with the Bicentennial Women of Achievement award.

Brennan was made a Member of the Order of Australia (AM) in 1993, in recognition of her services to the community, particularly as founding president of the Movement for the Ordination of Women.

== Death and legacy ==
Brennan died in 2011, aged 66, of pancreatic cancer.

Her papers are held at the State Library of New South Wales. The Liverpool sexual assault clinic was renamed in her honour in Sydney.

== Select publications ==
- Brennan, Patricia. "O Sydney, Sydney, killing the prophets...", Women-Church: Australian Journal of Feminist Studies in Religion, no. 40 (2007): 60–65. Digitised version of no. 40 (2007) available on JSTOR Open Community Collections, University of Divinity Digital Collections, Mannix Library

== See also ==
- The Twelve Theses (poster)
- Movement for the Ordination of Women
- Ordination of women in the Anglican Diocese of Sydney
