= Movement for the Ordination of Women =

Anglican group in England and Australia

The Movement for the Ordination of Women (MOW) was the name used by organisations in England and Australia that campaigned for the ordination of women as deacons, priests and bishops in the Anglican Communion.

== England ==
The decision in 1978 by the Church of England General Synod to refuse women's ordination led to the foundation of the Movement for the Ordination of Women.

MOW followed in the footsteps of the League for the Church Militant, the 1930 re-grouping of the Church League for Women's Suffrage. The first Moderator was Stanley Booth-Clibborn, Bishop of Manchester, who served from 1979 to 1982. MOW operated in England from 1979 until women were ordained as priests, disbanding in 1994.

MOW was succeeded by Women and the Church (WATCH), which was founded in 1996. In 2017 WATCH became a charity directed towards promoting "gender equality and diversity with the Church of England as experienced by both lay and ordained people for the public benefit".

MOW published the first edition of All Desires Known by Janet Morley.

== Australia ==
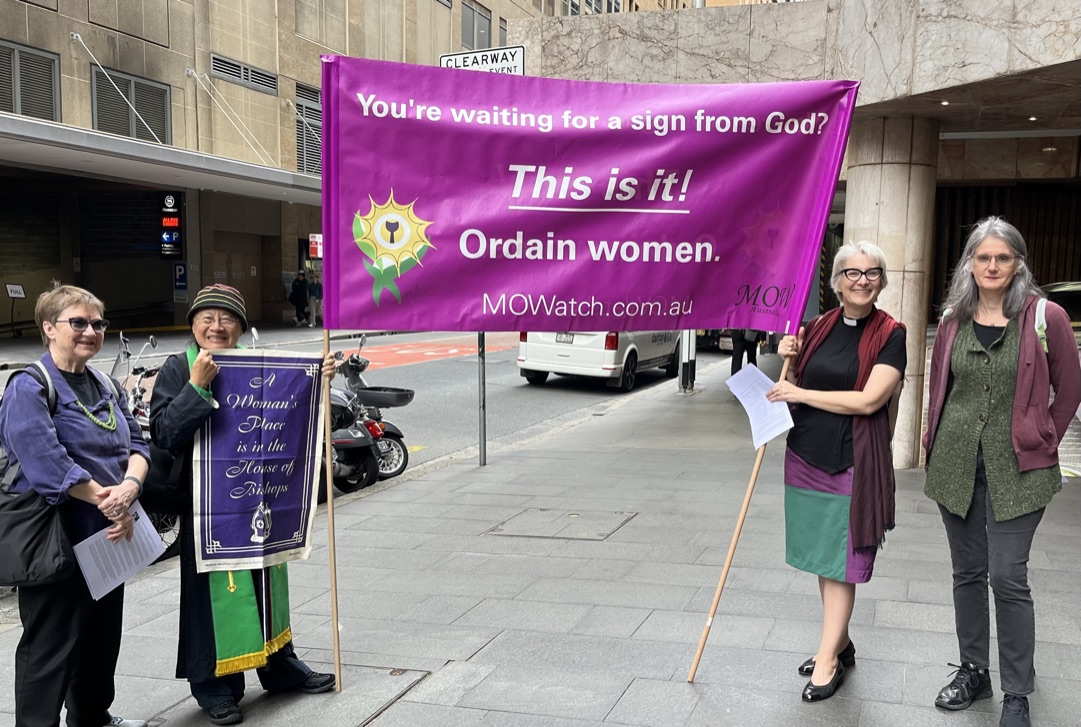
MOW members outside Sydney Synod September 2023

The Australian Movement for the Ordination of Women was founded in 1983 to advocate for the ordination of women as deacons, priests and bishops in the Anglican Church of Australia. Dr Patricia Brennan was the founding national President. She was succeeded by Dr Janet Scarfe in 1989. The organisation published the Movement for the Ordination of Women (newsletter) between 1984 and 1997.

There were several pre-existing Australian state-based groups supporting the ordination of women, including:

- Anglican Women Concerned in Sydney established in 1975 by Colleen O'Reilly and Zandra Wilson. Anglican Women Concerned organised a demonstration outside St Andrew's Cathedral during General Synod in 1977.
- Women in Holy Orders? was established in Adelaide on 30 May 1980 and the first meeting was held at the home of Alison Gent.
- Action Group for Women's Ordination in Melbourne was formed in 1983 as an umbrella group under the mentorship of Ryl Currey. Weekly services were held at St Oswald's Church, Glen Iris.

There were differences within these Australian groups about styles of protest and activism. Some members were uncomfortable in the public arena and feared that "engaging in political strategy and power games" might divert the issue from its spiritual path.

One of the first public actions by Sydney MOW members was in October 1983 when it blu-tacked a poster calling for "Reformation" and listing 12 propositions for the ordination of women on the door of St Andrew's Cathedral. The action was modelled on Martin Luther's 'Ninety-Five Theses'. The poster was attached to the door of the cathedral by Colleen O'Reilly, Julia Perry and Patricia Brennan on 4 October 1983, during the Sydney Synod. The text of the poster was written by Susanne Glover and the calligraphy was by Walter McEntee. One outcome of the action was that on 4 May 1984 the Australian Church Record hosted and reported on an ordination debate between MOW representatives, theologians and prominent Sydney Anglicans. Supporters for women's ordination were Charles Sherlock, Gordon Preece and Susanne Glover while debaters against were John Woodhouse and Robert Forsyth. The original poster is in the collection of the Museum of Australian Democracy (MOAD) at Old Parliament House, donated to MOAD at the 2012 conference in Canberra by the outgoing President of MOW, Susan Sandford.

In May 1984, English author Monica Furlong accepted an invitation to tour Australia and was influential in supporting and energising the Australian campaign. The first of many national MOW conferences was held in Sydney in 1985.

The key speaker at the 1985 conference, 'Telling Tales', was the Reverend Alison Cheek, a South Australian woman who had been 'irregularly' ordained priest in the Episcopal Church in 1974 (one of the 'Philadelphia Eleven') Cheek was not permitted to publicly celebrate the Eucharist, but she did preach in Melbourne. In Brisbane, Archbishop Sir John Grindrod instructed clergy that Cheek was neither to preach nor take part in any formal procession into a church. Cheek visited Australia many times and was a key supporter of MOW, appreciated as a model of sacramental ministry by a woman.

At that same conference, Caroline Pearce was blessed by the 200 participants prior to setting off to study theology in the United States, where she was subsequently ordained, before returning to Australia in 1989; her priestly ministry was finally recognised in 1992 when General Synod made it legally possible for women to be ordained as priests.

MOW was particularly active in arguing for women's ordination in the court of public opinion, often through the secular media, but the decision to ordain women had to be made by the Anglican Church of Australia – it was a legal matter and different dioceses had different opinions on the matter. In 1968, the Lambeth Conference requested regional churches (including the Australian churches) discuss women's ordination, but it was not until 1985 that the Australian General Synod passed the Ordination of Women to the Office of Deacon Canon, which conferred authority on bishops of any dioceses that adopted the Canon to ordain a woman as deacon. This opened the way for women to progress to priesthood, although that was not confirmed until 1991 by the Appellate Tribunal.

=== Ordinations ===
Australia's first women deacons were ordained in Melbourne on 9 February 1986 by Archbishop David Penman. Opponents of the ordination threatened the Archbishop with legal action and the ceremony itself was delayed when the report of a bomb forced the evacuation of St Paul's Cathedral. The eight women ordinands included Kay Goldsworthy, one of the last women deaconesses appointed in Melbourne, and Kate Prowd. Goldworthy subsequently became the first female Archbishop in the Anglican Church of Australia and Prowd was appointed assistant bishop in the Diocese of Melbourne in 2018. MOW members from around Australia attended the ordination service.

In 1991 Bishop Owen Dowling of Canberra announced that he intended to ordain eleven women as priests on 2 February 1992. This was challenged in the Supreme Court of New South Wales and the NSW Court of Appeal subsequently restrained Bishop Dowling from ordaining the female candidates. MOW was well represented at the 'non-ordination' as it became known; it was a distressing event, both for the women involved and for many members of the wider church community who were aghast that a secular court had been drawn in to adjudicate on the matter.

Civil proceedings were also commenced in Perth when Archbishop Peter Carnley announced that he was ordaining female priests, but the Supreme Court of Western Australia refused to grant an interlocutory injunction. Thus it was, on 7 March 1992, the first women priests were ordained in the Anglican Church of Australia in Perth, even though General Synod did not overturn the late 19th century English church law (the Phillimore Rule) that said women were incapable of ordination until November 1992. MOW members were present in Perth to witness ten women being ordained, amongst their number, Kay Goldsworthy. MOW members were present at each of the ordinations that took place in most Australian dioceses in 1992. By the end of 1992, 90 women had been ordained, and the overseas ordinations of three more women had been recognised, (although a woman ordained in Hong Kong but then licensed as a priest in Perth in 1992 was counted as ordained in Australia), hence the MOW slogan, "92 in '92".

In 2007, the Appellate Tribunal ruled that dioceses could elect female bishops if they had already accepted female priests. Kay Goldsworthy was the first woman appointed a bishop in the Anglican Church in Australia in 2008, subsequently followed by other appointments.

=== Continuing advocacy ===
==== 2014-2017 ====
MOW changed its name to MOWatch in 2014, following the lead of the English Movement for the Ordination of Women. However, it reverted to MOW in 2017, in recognition of the fact that several Australian dioceses, the most powerful of which, the Anglican Diocese of Sydney, still refuse to ordain women priests.

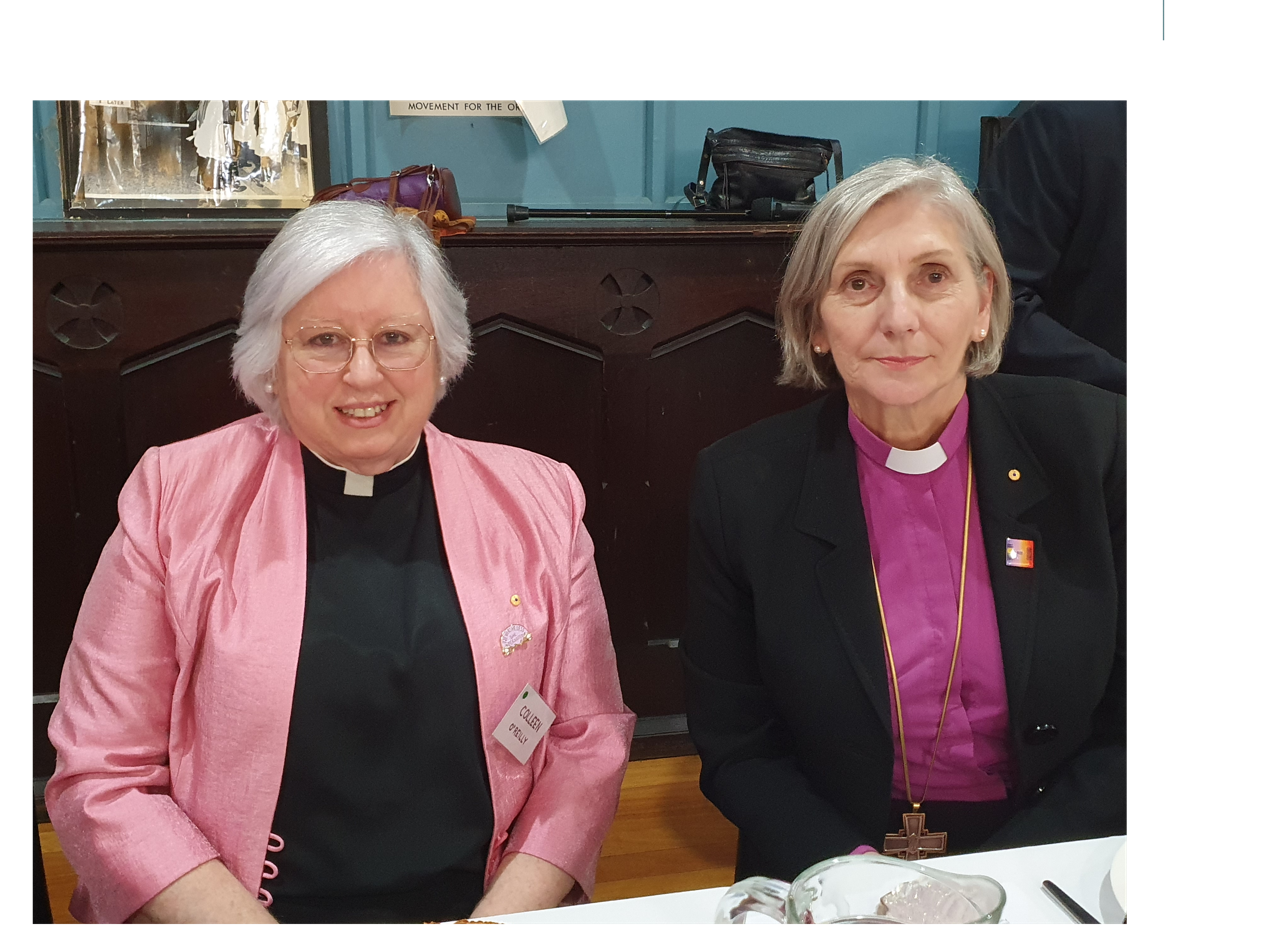
Colleen O'Reilly (left) and Kay Goldsworthy (right) at the MOW 40th anniversary

==== 2023 ====
MOW continued its commitment to challenging and transforming the Anglican Church of Australia and its role in the community. On 17 September 2023, MOW held its 40th Anniversary celebrations. In the week before, members handed out pamphlets about the celebration and the movement to clergy and laity entering the synod of the Anglican Diocese of Sydney. Julia Baird, journalist and ordination campaigner interviewed Kay Goldsworthy and Michael Jensen on The Drum and published an article in the Sydney Morning Herald about the Diocese of Sydney's refusal to acknowledge women as priests and bishops.

On Sunday 17 September 2023 Kay Goldsworthy preached at Christ Church St Laurence, Sydney, as part of the celebrations. A MOW lunch was held in the church hall afterwards where Colleen O'Reilly gave the Dr Patricia Brennan AM Lecture, in honour of the founding National President.

==== 2024 ====
The 40th anniversary of MOW as a national network was celebrated at a conference, 'Lead Like a Woman!', in Brisbane, 28–30 November 2024. The conference, which focused on challenges faced by women as lay and ordained leaders across Christian denominations, signalled MOW's determination to continue advocating on behalf of women's ministry. The need for such advocacy was subsequently highlighted by Julia Baird in an online essay published by ABC News, "The church's disappearing women".

== See also ==
- List of the first women ordained as priests in the Anglican Church of Australia in 1992
- Ordination of women in the Anglican Communion
- Ordination of women in the Anglican diocese of Sydney
