= Charles Sherlock =

Australian theologian (born 1945)

Charles Henry Sherlock AM (born 1945) is an Australian theologian who previously taught at Ridley College and Trinity College in Melbourne. He is a former registrar of the Melbourne College of Divinity (now the University of Divinity). He is author of The Doctrine of Humanity in InterVarsity Press's "Contours of Christian Theology" series, God on the Inside (Acorn), Uncovering Theology: the depth, scope and utility of Australian theological education (ATF), Performing the Gospel on liturgy and lifestyle (Broughton) and more. He was a member of the Anglican–Roman Catholic International Commission for 26 years. He was the last editor of the Anglican newspaper Church Scene, from 1995 to 1997.

Sherlock became a Member of the Order of Australia in the 2019 Australia Day Honours.

== Personal life ==
Charles married Peta Sherlock (Sproule) in 1970, who he calls his "co-theologian". They are the parents of two sons, one of whom is Peter Sherlock. Charles has a special interest in Meccano and appeared on the Australian quiz show Hard Quiz
