= List of the first women ordained as priests in the Anglican Church of Australia in 1992 =

For the first time women were ordained as priests in the Anglican Church of Australia in 1992. These women are notable as a group as the ordinations were a historic milestone for the church. The debates in the General Synod and diocesan synods of the church about the proposal to ordain women were reported in church and mainstream press in the years leading up to 1992, as were the ordination services in 1992. The first ordination service in Perth was televised. The anniversary of the 1992 ordination of women priests is regularly celebrated in the relevant dioceses and the women's names are often listed in media reports of those ceremonial services.

There were 90 women ordained as priests in Australia in 1992. Three women were ordained priests in other countries but were given permission to officiate in Australia in 1992.

The dioceses are listed in chronological order of the dates they ordained the first women as priests. The women are listed alphabetically under the diocese in which they were ordained. The last name is the name they were ordained under. A later married name is in brackets after their last name and a preferred first name is also in brackets after their first name(s).

== Perth ==
=== 7 March 1992 ===
- Arney, Elizabeth Emmaline (Betty)
- Couche, Elizabeth Mae
- Goldsworthy, Kay Maree
- Halbert, Constance Pamela
- Hall, Jennifer Robin (Jenny)
- Milne, Teresa Catherine (Tess)
- Peterkin, Judith Mary
- Pinner, Catherine Joyce (Cathy)
- Polson, Joyce Sylvia
- Tandy, Robin Kathleen Barbara

== Adelaide ==
=== 5 December 1992 ===
- Claring-Bould, Joan Rosemary
- Monahan (Walters), Flora Elizabeth (Flo)
- Pain, Susanna Leigh
- Rees, Pamela Juliana (Sr Juliana)
- Straub, Susan Frances

== Rockhampton ==
=== 12 December 1992 ===
- Blackford, Barbara Frances
- Lake, Jacqueline (Jackie)
- Quaife, Lucy Lee
- Whitehead, Janne Eileen

== Melbourne ==
=== 13 December 1992, 16 December 1992, 21 December 1992 ===
- Alfred, Mary Elizabeth (Elizabeth)
- Campbell, Frances Adair
- Chambers (Watson), Susanne Judith
- Clarke, Alison Lynne (Lynne)
- Cruickshank, Kim Dawn
- Darling, Barbara Brinsley
- Dean (Dennis), Elizabeth Ann
- Good, Nanette Henrietta Irving
- Granowski, Helen Barbara
- Hall, Joanne Margaret
- Harrison, Ruth Margaret
- Hartley, Margaret Isabel
- Heskett, Margaret Anne (Sr Margaret Anne)
- Hetzel, Anna Jane Killigrew (Ann)
- Johnson, Janet Mary
- Letts, Lineve Joy (Joy)
- Maddock, Willy Ruth
- Marten, Heather Ruth
- Nixon, Geraldine Elizabeth
- Pace, Barbara Jean
- Payne, Robin Ashley
- Pearce, Jo-Iris Aline (Jo) Lamphard
- Pinchbeck, Gail Phyllis
- Prowd (Urwin), Catherine Jane (Kate)
- Richards, Elizabeth May
- Roath, Hilary Ann
- Rockwell (Dunn), Jennifer Maureen (Jenny)
- Saunders, Lydia
- Sherlock, Peta Robin
- Simondson, Adrienne Louise
- Sutherland (Inglis), Jennifer Frances (Jenny)
- Taplin, Clemence Charlotte Faith (Clem)
- Turner, Amy Inez

== Bendigo ==
=== 19 December 1992 ===
- Hannah, Carlie

== Bathurst ==
=== 19 December 1992 ===
- Percival, Verney Clare (Clare)
- Voerman, Margaret

== Canberra and Goulburn ==
=== 20 December 1992 ===
- Cullen, Helen Victoria (Vicky)
- Dittmar-McCollim, Ann
- Dudzinski, Anne Elizabeth
- Gifford, Elaine Margaret
- Kelley, Julie Rosamonde
- May, Daphne Jean
- Mendham, (Jill) later Varcoe, Gillian Joan
- Mills (Dudley), Ruth Isabel
- Phillips, Pamela Jean
- Streatfield, Margaret Louise
- Tabor, Barbara Gail

== Brisbane ==
=== 20 December 1992 ===
- Graydon, Christine Valerie (Val)
- King, Patricia Eileen
- Pascoe, Joan
- Pitman, Kaye
- Shaw, Leah Mary
- Thomson, Eileen Grace

== Newcastle ==
=== 21 December 1992 ===
- Armstrong, Maree Lillian
- Bourne, Sheila Margaret
- Carr, Margaret Mary
- Fuller, Audrey Ann
- Howard, Barbara Janice
- Pate, Beatrice
- Perry, Julia Frances Harriet
- Sauber, Pamela Vera (Pam)
- Solling, Wendy Hope (Sr Angela)
- Tibbey, Valerie Joan (Val)
- Willsher, Jennifer Kay (Jenny)

== Tasmania ==
=== 21 December 1992 ===
- Crawshaw, Patricia Margaret
- Fraser, Elvie Pearl
- Gaden, Janet Eade
- Le Rossignol, Barbara Helen Fawcett
- Perrott (Perrott-Russell), Rosemary Alexandra
- Weaver, Rosina
- Yearsley, Honor Helen

== Ordained outside Australia but granted licences or permission to officiate as priest in 1992 ==
- Kenyon, Colleen Dawn. Ordained priest in Auckland NZ 1987, licensed as Priest in Perth in January 1992.
- Leaves (Craig-Leaves), Julie Elizabeth. Ordained priest in Hong Kong 1992, licensed as Priest in Perth and Brisbane from 1992. (Note: Julie Leaves was ordained priest in St John's Cathedral Hong Kong but moved to Perth soon after where she was granted permission to officiate then to Brisbane where she has spent most of her career as a chaplain or priest. She is sometimes counted as a woman priest ordained in Australia in 1992.)
- Pearce, Caroline Heath. Ordained priest 1988 Newark US, Licensed as Priest in Melbourne from December 1992.

== See also ==
- Ordination of women
- Ordination of women in Christianity
- Ordination of women in the Anglican Diocese of Sydney
- List of the first 32 women ordained as Church of England priests
- Timeline of women's ordination
