= Ordination of women in the Anglican Diocese of Sydney =

Diocese during the Anglican movement

The ordination of women in the Anglican Diocese of Sydney in Australia is restricted to the diaconate (ie as deacons). The diocese rejects the ordination of women as priests (presbyters) and bishops.

== Diocesan position ==
One of the differences between Anglican Diocese of Sydney and the majority of other Anglican dioceses in Australia has been its unwillingness to allow the ordination of women to the priesthood (itself a term infrequently used in the diocese) or presbyterate. This issue is an indicator of Sydney's difference in ecclesiology and theology to most other dioceses within the Anglican Communion.

For many Anglicans outside Evangelical churches and even for many Sydney Anglicans within Evangelical churches, the central act of worship is the celebration of the Eucharist. Within the Anglican Communion the Eucharist can only be legally presided by an ordained priest or bishop. For many who have opposed the ordination of women the sex of the priest who presides at the Eucharist has been a major issue. But in the Sydney diocese the sex of the person is of less significance than the matter of headship in the church and the preaching and teaching which is central to Evangelical ministry.

== Interpretations of the teachings of Paul ==
The reason for Sydney's strong opposition towards the ordination of women to the presbyterate is based partly upon their interpretation of the teachings of the Apostle Paul in respect to the understanding of the Greek word kephale (κεφαλη) mentioned in Ephesians 5:23, interpreting Paul's guidance about women teaching in Ephesus given in 1 Timothy 2:12 as permanent and for all the church, and inferring gender roles from 1 Corinthians 11.

The diocese has, however, ordained women as deacons since 1989. In 1994, Harry Goodhew appointed a deacon, Dianne Nicolios, as archdeacon in charge of women's ministries. She later resigned to be ordained a priest in the Diocese of Melbourne.

Women who are ordained as priests outside the diocese, such as Susanna Pain who returned to Sydney to take up the position of assistant at St James' King Street, are acknowledged by the diocese as deacons rather than priests and the female Archbishop of Perth, Kaye Goldsworthy, although allowed to preach in a Sydney church, is not allowed to wear her archbishop's robes and mitre or preside at the Eucharist.

== Legal action ==
In 1992 a then member of the standing committee of the diocesan synod, Laurie Scandrett, joined with Dalba Primmer (the then rector of St John's Bega in the Diocese of Canberra and Goulburn) and David Robarts (then the incumbent of Christ Church, Brunswick, in the Diocese of Melbourne) in a court action (Scandrett v Dowling (1992) 27 NSWLR 483) to prevent the Bishop of Canberra and Goulburn from ordaining women as presbyters. The action failed in the New South Wales Court of Appeal and it delayed the ordination by several months.

== Continuing disagreement ==
Sydney's stand on the issue has been a source of disagreement within the diocese, as well as an occasional cause of tension between Sydney and the Diocese of Melbourne. However, a number of prominent Sydney Anglicans who are supportive of the ordination of women have ministered or are currently ministering in Melbourne — for example Peter Watson (Archbishop of Melbourne, 2000–2006), Stephen Hale, Bishop of the Eastern Region and Dianne Nicolios, former Archdeacon for Women's Ministries.

== Archdeacon for Women's Ministries ==
The most senior ordained woman in the diocese is the Archdeacon for Women's Ministries. The title is often shortened to the Archdeacon for Women. The role was created in 1993 as "an Archdeacon with special responsibilities for women's ministry".

- January 1994 – May 2002: The Revd Dianne Nicolios
- November 2002 – 2012: The Revd Narelle Jarrett
- 2012 – present: The Revd Kara Hartley (née Gilbert)

== See also ==
- Ordination of women in the Anglican communion
- List of the first women ordained as priests in the Anglican Church of Australia in 1992
- The Twelve Theses (poster)
