= Barbara Darling =

Anglican bishop in Australia

The Right Reverend Barbara Darling
- Church: Anglican Church of Australia
- Diocese: Melbourne

Orders
- Ordination: 1986 (deacon); 1992 (priest)
- Consecration: 2008

Personal details
- Born: Barbara Brinsley Darling; 17 October 1947
- Died: 15 February 2015 (aged 67)
- Education: University of Sydney (BA, DipEd); University of Melbourne (MA)

Barbara Brinsley Darling (17 October 1947 – 15 February 2015) was an Australian Anglican bishop. She was among the first women to be an ordained deacon in the Anglican Church of Australia.

Darling was born in Burwood, Sydney, one of three children of Geoff and Honor Darling. In 1975 she began studying theology at Ridley College, Melbourne.

Darling was ordained as deacon on 9 February 1986 and as a priest on 13 December 1992. She was consecrated to the episcopate at St Paul's Cathedral, Melbourne, on 31 May 2008. She became the first woman to be a bishop in the Anglican Diocese of Melbourne. She was the Bishop for Diocesan Ministries until 2009 when she became the Bishop of the Eastern Region.

Darling died on 15 February 2015 following a stroke. Her funeral was held at St Paul's Cathedral, Melbourne, on 22 February 2015.

== See also ==
- Ordination of women in the Anglican Communion
