= Australian Church Record =

Christian Newspaper published in Australia

The Australian Church Record is an Australian Christian newspaper. It was founded in 1880, and is based in Sydney. It has historically represented the evangelical wing of the Anglican Church of Australia.
