= Mary Andrews College =

Ministry training college for women in Sydney

- Former name: Deaconess House
- Established: 1891
- Location: Level 1 St Andrew's House 464–480 Kent St Sydney, Australia; 33.8740°S 151.2054°E
- Website: www.mac.edu.au

Mary Andrews College, formerly known as Deaconess House, is a Bible college in Sydney. It is the only one in Australia with an exclusively female student body. Mary Andrews College offers diplomas through the Australian College of Theology.

Mary Andrews College was established in 1891 as a training institution for deaconesses. It is Anglican in ethos but independent of the Sydney Diocese. The college was renamed in 1997 in honour of Deaconess Mary Andrews.
