= Christ Church, South Yarra =

Anglican church in Melbourne

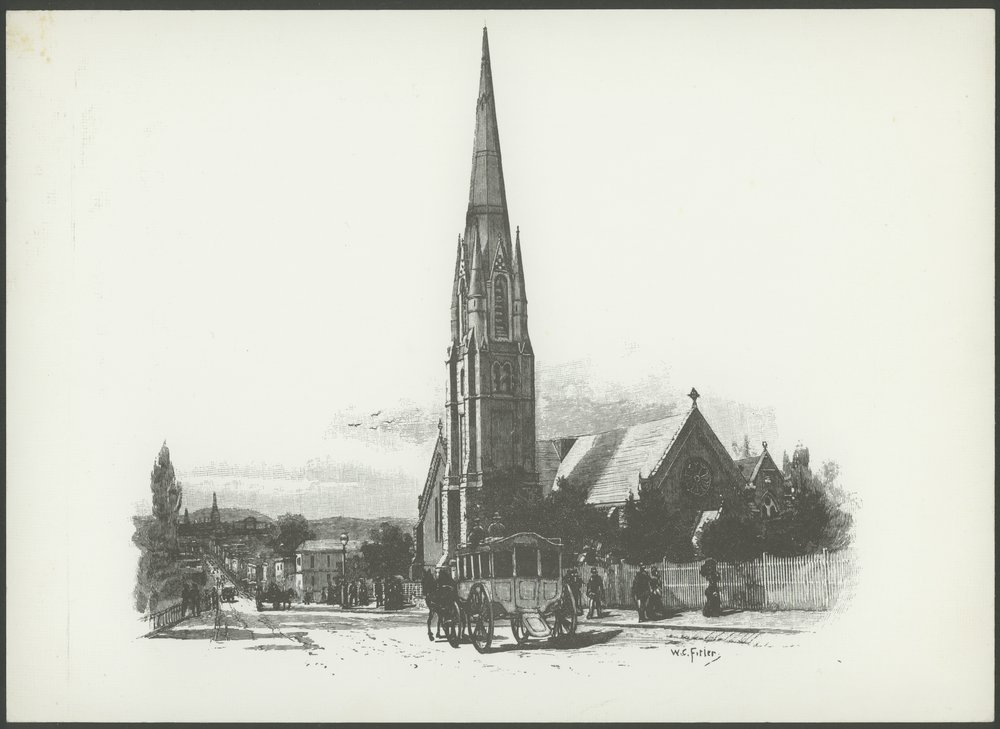
- Christ Church, South Yarra, in c. 1888
- Christ Church, South Yarra
- 37°50′19″S 144°59′09″E
- Address: 683-701 Punt Road, South Yarra, Melbourne, Victoria
- Country: Australia
- Denomination: Anglican
- Churchmanship: Anglo-Catholic; High Church
- Website: ccsy.org.au

History
- Status: Church
- Founded: April 1856
- Founder: Major General Edward Macarthur
- Consecrated: 1875 by Dr Samuel Thornton, Bishop of Ballarat

Architecture
- Functional status: Active
- Architects: Charles Webb; James Taylor; Reed, Henderson and Smart
- Architectural type: Church
- Style: Gothic Revival

Specifications
- Materials: Bluestone, Oamaru stone

Administration
- Diocese: Melbourne

Victorian Heritage Register
- Official name: Christ Church
- Type: State heritage (built)
- Designated: 30 July 1986
- Reference no.: 1080

Christ Church is an Anglican church at 683-701 Punt Road, South Yarra, in Melbourne, Victoria, Australia. Established in 1856, the congregation forms part of the Anglican Diocese of Melbourne. The parish belongs to the Anglo-Catholic or High Church tradition; it was the location of the ordination of the first woman to be a deaconess in Australia in 1884.

== History ==
In 1852, land was set aside for a parish district including what is now South Yarra. Community meetings were held in the Ayres Arms Hotel and the South Yarra Hotel (now the Arcadia), and early services were held in the nearby Presbyterian Sunday School. The first vicar was appointed in 1855. The church was dedicated as Christ Church in either late 1855 or early 1856. Construction of the church began in April 1856 following the laying of a foundation stone by Major General Edward Macarthur, and was sufficiently advanced by April 1857 for the first service to be held in it. The church was enlarged in 1860, and was consecrated in 1875 by Dr Samuel Thornton, Bishop of Ballarat. The tower and spire were built later: the foundation stone was laid in 1881 by Sir Henry Brougham Loch, the Governor of the colony. The spire was modelled on that of Salisbury Cathedral. The spire and south aisle were completed in 1886; the north aisle in 1887.

In 1884 Bishop Moorhouse ordained Marion Macfarlane to be the first deaconess in Australia in Christ Church. Moorhouse explicitly used the term 'ordination'.

The vicarage was built in 1859 during the incumbency of the first Vicar, the Rev. William Guinness. It was the birthplace of the founder of the Brotherhood of St Laurence, Fr Gerard Tucker, in 1885. Since 2012, the Brotherhood of St Laurence has held an annual Gerard Tucker Oration at Christ Church.

Christ Church Grammar School was established as a parish primary school in 1898, and remains associated with the parish.

== Architecture ==
Located on the corner of Toorak and Punt Roads, the church's tall spire is a local landmark. The church is built of local bluestone. Although the original proposal had been to engage the architect Charles Vickers with a design with a central tower and freestone facings, this plan fell through due to lack of funds. The next plan was for a tin tabernacle, built by Hemmings of Bristol. Nothing came of this poorly-received proposal, and in late 1855 the parish building committee chose a design by Charles Webb and James Taylor. This was in preference to a design by Joseph Reed. The tower (built of Oamaru stone) and spire and aisles were built later to a design by Reed, Henderson and Smart.

The north transept is the Lady Chapel, and was set out as such in 1940. For many years the south transept was used as a chapel for Christ Church Grammar School. The church has a kauri pine rood screen and pulpit, both dating from 1890 and designed by G. A. Badger. The high altar was replaced in 1937, the new high altar being designed by Hadwen and Houghton, and the old high altar being given to the parish of St John's, Bungaree in 1939.

Other features include an alabaster bust by William Wetmore Story depicting Lt Alexander Gordon Anderson, and General Sir Harry Chauvel's sword.

The church is listed on the Victorian Heritage Register.

=== Stained glass ===
Three windows in the north transept depicting the Life of Joseph are the work of Clayton and Bell; they were installed in 1868 and were given in memory of the first Premier of Victoria, William Haines. The south transept windows (depicting the Good Samaritan, Solomon's Temple, and Christ and the Samaritan Woman) are also probably the work of Clayton & Bell.

The three windows in the sanctuary above the high altar were the work of Ferguson and Urie, and were installed in 1881. The west window depicts the Resurrection, and was installed by John Brown of Brooks, Robinson & Co in 1892.

The windows in the south wall of the nave depict the Blessed Virgin, by Mathieson Stained Glass, and the Sacrifice of Isaac, by John Hughes of Hughes and Rogers, dating from 1892. A slightly earlier rose window in the west of the nave (1889), by Charles Rogers & Co, depicts the Agnus Dei. The Horace Tucker memorial window in the baptistry, and the windows depicting St Michael, St Paul, the Ascension and the Baptism of Jesus, were the work of William Montgomery. There is also a window depicting a portrait of the first Vicar, William Guinness, by Napier Waller from 1961.

=== Organ ===
A harmonium was installed in the gallery in the first stage of the church in 1857. In 1869, shortly before it was replaced, it was described in the Weekly Times as a "large old harmonium, … the tone of [which] is extremely suggestive of a weary old man whose lungs are nearly gone, and who is afflicted with chronic asthma. It is a most villainous piece of machinery." This was replaced by a two-manual William Hill & Sons pipe organ in 1871. It was rebuilt and enlarged by George Fincham & Sons in 1916 and again by Hill & Sons' successor firm Hill, Norman & Beard in 1954. Further additions were made by J. W. Walker & Sons Ltd in 1962 and by Hill, Norman & Beard in 1965. By the 1970s and 80s it became increasingly unreliable mechanically, and was unsuccessful tonally owing to the disparate nature of its contents. In 1998 it was replaced by a three-manual instrument built by the Irish organbuilder Kenneth Jones and Associates. The majority of the older pipework was retained, suitably revoiced, but with some new material. The console and casework are made from oak retrieved from a redundant Abbot and Smith organ in Ireland.

An early organist (1861-62) was Charles Edward Horsley, a pupil of Mendelssohn's, who resigned after six months, frustrated by Guinness's loyalty to Bishop Perry's injunctions against music, Perry being an extreme Evangelical. Leonard Fullard was the organist for the lengthy period of 1949-87.

== Music ==
There is a strong musical tradition at Christ Church, and it has been the venue for a number of premiere performances, including John Carmichael's Piano Concerto No. 2 in 2011, a carol-motet Bethlehem without a sound by Daniel Riley with words by Katherine Firth in 2018, and Lest We Forget, an arrangement by Matthew Orlovich in 2018.

== Mission ==
Christ Church describes its mission as sharing God's love for the world, aiming to be a community of hospitality, education, and outreach that invites everyone to experience God's generosity, nurtures and matures Christian faith and ministry, and brings the Gospel to our neighbourhood and beyond.

== Key people ==
=== Vicars ===
The following individuals have served as Vicar of Christ Church, including six of whom have gone on to become bishops.

Ordinal	Officeholder	Term start	Term end	Time in office	Notes
1	William Guinness	1855	1880	24–25 years	
2	Horace Tucker	1880	1908	27–28 years	
3	Leonard Townsend	1908	1938	29–30 years	
4	Charles Murray	1938	1944	5–6 years	Subsequently Bishop of Riverina; he died in 1950 in the Amana accident.
5	John McKie	1944	1946	1–2 years	Subsequently an assistant bishop in Melbourne. (McKie's older brother, Sir William McKie was the director of music at the Coronation of Elizabeth II in 1953.)
6	James Housden	1946	1947	0–1 years	HSubsequently Bishop of Rockhampton and then Bishop of Newcastle.
7	James Schofield	1947	1954	6–7 years	
8	Sydney Ball	1954	1965	10–11 years	
9	John Grindrod	1965	1966	0–1 years	Subsequently Bishop of Riverina, Bishop of Rockhampton, and Archbishop of Brisbane and Anglican Primate.
10	David Shand	1966	1969	2–3 years	Subsequently the last Bishop of St Arnaud.
11	Evan Wetherell	1970	1982	11–12 years	Subsequently Dean of St Peter's Cathedral, Armidale.
12	David Warner	1982	1992	9–10 years	
13	Desmond Benfield	1993	2006	12–13 years	
14	Richard Treloar	2007	2018	10–11 years	Served as the Bishop of Gippsland.
15	Craig D'Alton	2019	2022	2–3 years	
16	John Baldock	2023	Current	2–3 years	

=== Curates ===
Notable curates include the Irish composer George Torrance, Stephen Hart, who became Bishop of Wangaratta, Maurice Kelly, the founder of the Community of the Ascension, and Allen Winter, who became Bishop of St Arnaud.
