= David Shand (bishop) =

Australian Anglican bishop

David Hubert Warner Shand (6 April 1921 – 8 July 2011) was an Australian Anglican bishop. He was the third and last Bishop of St Arnaud.

== Early life ==
Shand was born into an ecclesiastical family. His father was the Revd Canon Rupert Warner Shand, the rector of St Luke's Anglican Church, Toowoomba. He was educated at The Southport School.

Shand served in the 2/3 Field Regiment AIF in New Guinea in the Second World War. Upon his return to Queensland he graduated ThL (Hons) and BA (Hons) from the University of Queensland.

== Ministry ==
Shand was ordained as a deacon in 1948 and a priest in 1949 in Brisbane. He was assistant curate at St Andrew's Lutwyche from 1948 to 1952.

On 11 March 1952, Shand became the incumbent of St Mary's Moorooka where he remained to 1953. He was then the incumbent at Inglewood (1953–55), Nambour (1955–60) and Ipswich (1963–66).

In 1966, Shand moved to the Diocese of Melbourne as the vicar of Christ Church, South Yarra, where he stayed until 1969. From 1969 to 1973 he was vicar at St Andrew's Brighton, Victoria.

Shand was consecrated as a bishop in 1973 and became the Bishop of St Arnaud. After the merger of his diocese with the Diocese of Bendigo he became the vicar of St Stephen's Mt Waverley and then bishop of the Southern Region of the Diocese of Melbourne until his retirement in 1985.

Shand's other ministry positions included being chaplain to the CMF from 1950 to 1957; organising secretary of the Home Mission Fund from 1960 to 1963; area dean of St Kilda from 1972 to 1973; chair of the General Board of Religious Education from 1974 to 1984; chair of the Department of Christian Education from 1978 to 1985; chair of the Christian Television Association from 1983 to 1985; and member of the cathedral chapter from 1985 to 1988. He was vicar general of the diocese from 1985 to 1988.

== Personal life ==
At the time of his death, Bishop Shand was survived by his wife Jean, four children (Jennifer, Susan, Michael and Ruth), eleven grandchildren and two great-grandchildren.

== Death ==
Shand died on 8 July 2011. A Requiem Eucharist was held at St Paul's Cathedral, Melbourne on 15 July 2011. The Rev John Leaver gave the Eulogy and the then Dean of St Paul's Cathedral, the Rt Rev Mark Burton delivered the homily.

Anglican Communion titles
Preceded by Allen Ernest Winter	Bishop of St Arnaud; 1973–1976	Succeeded by none (merged with Bendigo diocese)
