= James Moorhouse =

British bishop (1826–1915)

The Right Reverend James Moorhouse
- Bishop of Melbourne; Bishop of Manchester
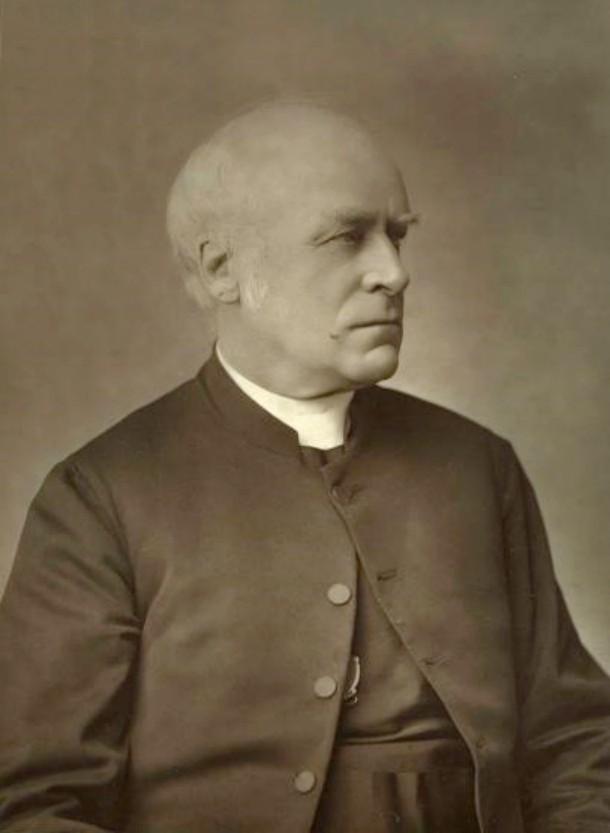
- James Moorhouse, 1889

Orders
- Ordination: 1854
- Consecration: 22 October 1876

Personal details
- Born: 19 November 1826 Sheffield, Yorkshire, England
- Died: 9 April 1915 (aged 88) Taunton, Somerset, England
- Denomination: Anglican
- Parents: James Moorhouse; Jane Frances née Bowman
- Education: St John's College, Cambridge

James Moorhouse (19 November 1826 – 9 April 1915) was an Anglican Bishop of Melbourne and a Bishop of Manchester, and a Chancellor of the University of Melbourne.

== Bishop of Melbourne ==
Moorhouse's distinguished record and many notable publications led to an offer of the see of Melbourne, vacated by Charles Perry. Consecrated at Westminster Abbey on 22 October 1876, Moorhouse was installed on 11 January 1877 at St James's Cathedral, William Street, Melbourne.

In 1882 Moorhouse told the Melbourne Church Assembly (Synod) of his intention to establish a Melbourne Deaconesses Home, building on the experience of the English Church since the revival of the Order of Deaconesses there in 1861. This would provide an authorised form of ministry for women, to work in areas such as education and what was then described as "rescue work" among the poorer areas of Melbourne. On 8 February 1884 he ordained Marion Macfarlane as a deaconess at Christ Church, South Yarra, the first ordination of a woman in the Australian Anglican Church.

An enthusiastic lecturer, debater and participant in the public life of Australia.

== Bishop of Manchester ==
In 1885, Moorhouse was appointed Bishop of Manchester. He left Melbourne on 10 March 1886 and was enthroned as the third Bishop of Manchester on 18 May 1886.

He received the honorary degree Doctor of Literature (DLitt) from the Victoria University of Manchester in February 1902 in connection with the 50th jubilee celebrations of the establishment of the university.

== Late life and legacy ==
His name is commemorated in the series of Moorhouse lectures inaugurated in 1910 by Dr Green, Bishop of Ballarat, and perpetuated by Arthur Headlam, J. Stephen Hart, and others.

Church of England titles
Preceded by Charles Perry	Bishop of Melbourne; 1876–1886	Succeeded by Field Flowers Goe
Preceded by James Fraser	Bishop of Manchester; 1886–1903	Succeeded by Edmund Knox
Academic offices
Preceded by Sir Anthony Brownless	Chancellor of the University of Melbourne; 1884–1886	Succeeded by
