= Teulon Beamish =

(1824-1914)

- Archdeacon of Melbourne
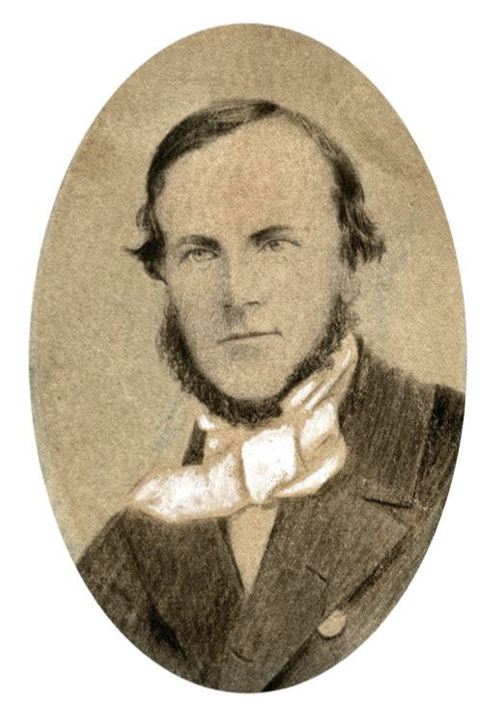
- Metropolis: Anglican Diocese of Melbourne
- Installed: 1878
- Term ended: 1898
- Other post: Vicar of Warrnambool from 1850 to 1895

Orders
- Ordination: 1847

Personal details
- Born: 11 January 1824
- Died: 20 August 1914 (aged 90)
- Denomination: Anglican

Peter Teulon Beamish (11 January 1824 – 20 August 1914) was Archdeacon of Melbourne from 1878 until 1898. Beamish was born at Killinear House in County Cork, the son of Dr. John Beamish and Maria Teulon. He was educated at Trinity College, Dublin and received the degree of Doctor of Divinity (DD).

He migrated to Australia in 1847, arriving in Sydney on July 26 aboard the John Fleming. He was ordained deacon at Sydney in 1847, and priest at Melbourne in 1850. After a curacies at Singleton, New South Wales and Illawarra he was Vicar of Warrnambool from 1850 to 1895.

Poor health and deteriorating eyesight forced his retirement. He died in Camberwell, Melbourne in 1914.
