= George Aickin =

Anglican dean

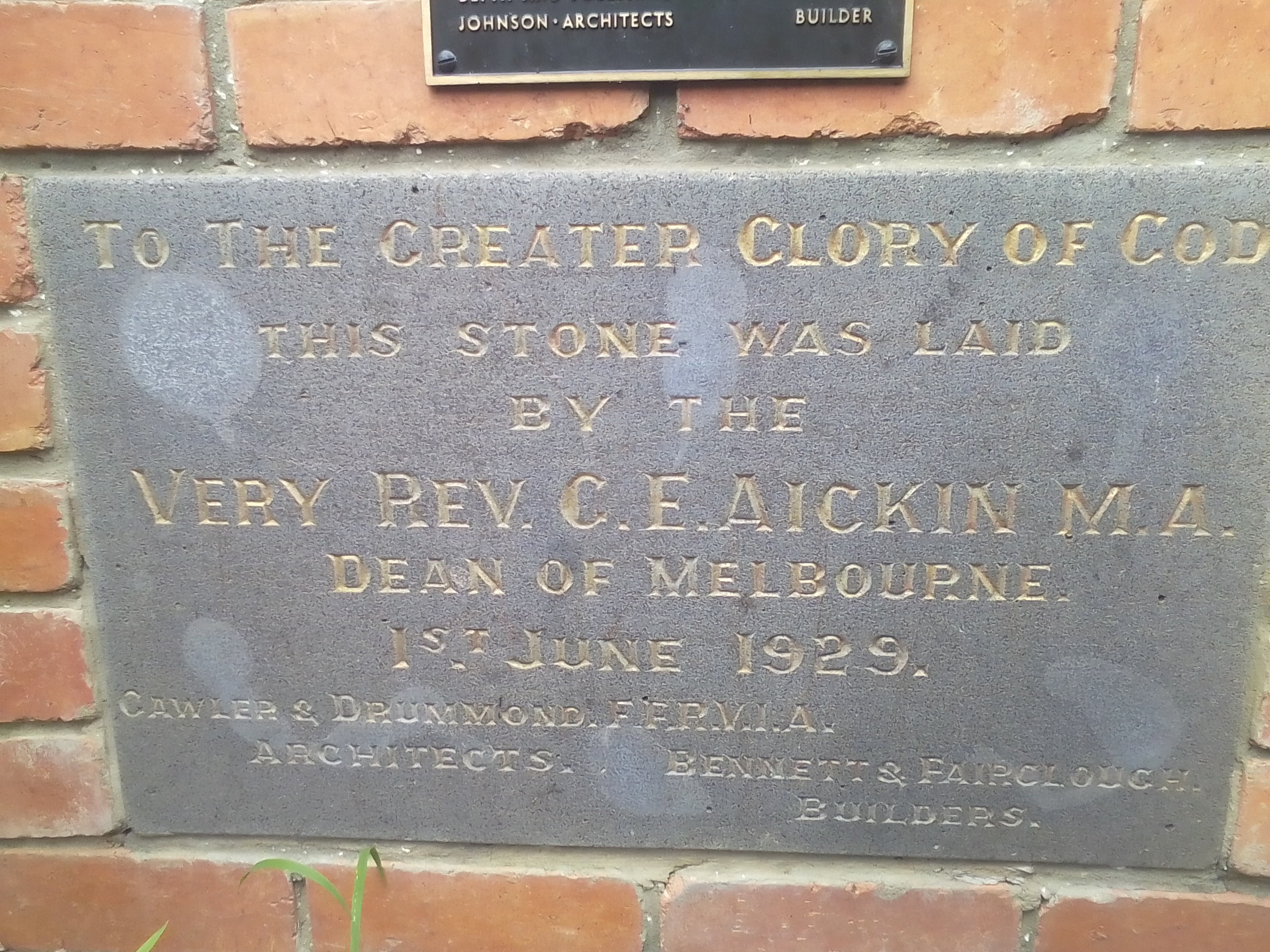
Foundation Plate at St. Matthew's Anglican Church, Glenroy

George Ellis Aickin (1869 – 4 August 1937) was a British Anglican priest in Australia and Dean of Melbourne from 1927 to 1932.

Aickin was born in Liverpool in 1869, educated at Liverpool College and St John’s College, Cambridge, and ordained in 1895. He received an MA from St John's College, Cambridge, in February 1902. After curacies in Wargrave, Ravenhead and Darwen he became the Chaplain at St Aidan’s College, Birkenhead. After an incumbency at Upton he emigrated to Australia. He was Principal of Ridley College, Melbourne, from 1910 to 1918; Archdeacon of Bendigo from 1918 to 1919; Archdeacon of Dandenong from 1919 to 1932; and Dean of Melbourne from 1927 to 1932.

He died on 4 August 1937.

Religious titles
Preceded by John Stephen Hart	Dean of Melbourne; 1927–1932	Succeeded by Frederick Waldegrave Head
