= Shut Up & Write! =

Time management method for writing

Shut Up & Write! creates communities of writing practice that encourage people to gather to write together, online or face to face. It was introduced by Rennie Saunders in 2007 at Crossroads Cafe, San Francisco. It has since been adopted by over 100,000 members in over 60 countries.

At each session, writers are encouraged to set a clear goal, and then write in focused bursts with short intervals for conversation. At the end of the session, writers are invited to reflect on what they have achieved. Many sessions use the Pomodoro Technique to manage periods of writing and breaks. Shut Up and Write! provides writers with sessions focused on dedicated writing time and open conversation. It focuses on building community between writers and developing good writing habits.

A hallmark of Shut Up and Write! is the absence of read-alouds, critiques, and feedback. There is no requirement for writers to share their work. That is, it focuses on increasing writing productivity rather than increasing writing quality. It also fosters inclusion and reduces isolation.

== Effectiveness ==
In 2023, Chelsea Proulx et al. demonstrated that writers showed significant gains in self-efficacy and self-regulation through attending Shut Up and Write! Megan von Isenburg et al. found that, while Shut Up and Write! was effective for those who attended, it was difficult for busy people to find time to attend sessions. Jennifer Stritch reported that participants felt that they had confidence, connectedness, and support, as well as a reduction in unproductive writing behaviors and an improvement in writing generativity and outputs.

== Adoption by academia ==
Although Shut Up and Write! was developed for writers outside of academia, it has been adopted by academia as an effective strategy. Many articles identify a blog post in 2011 by Inger Mewburn as a trigger for adoption (e.g.). In 2016, Tara Brabazon utilised a distinctive methodology from the Shut Up and Write! project to reduce isolation among graduate students as part of the Digital Doctorate project. This methodology was then transformed through Write Club, where all the sessions were recorded, and asynchronous participation was encouraged. A year of Write Club Sessions are available to share and use.

In 2017, Michelle Reeve and Matthew Partridge argued that Shut Up and Write! could provide isolated researchers with support, and encourage discussion and sharing of problems. In 2018, Joe Thorogood et al. identified Shut Up and Write! as part of the Slow Movement, and an effective way to reduce stress and overwork in academia. Fabian Cannizzo sees Shut Up and Write! as a way to expose academics and students to different rhythms, paces, senses of pressure and relief, social and technological infrastructures. In 2021, Thea Blackler argues that setting up a Shut Up and Write! session allowed her to support her colleagues while building the culture of research and writing, as well as meeting her own writing goals.

The great advantage of SUAW for me is that it allows me to make a contribution to supporting my colleagues and building research and writing culture but does not take any extra time out of my day as I am writing too. And it forces me to write for around 1.5 hours each week, even if I get no other writing done that week.

In particular, Shut Up and Write! is seen as a useful practice for PhD students. In 2023, Cally Guerin and Claire Aitchison wrote that Shut Up and Write helps students to understand how long writing takes, as well as a sense of how others manage their writing time. In 2024, Catherine Déri argued that Shut Up and Write! allows for socialization into academia through peer exchange, the development of skills beyond writing, and a better understanding of the difficulties encountered during the PhD.

== Variations ==
Many groups have adapted the Shut Up and Write! model to focus on a particular group of writers, or to include some element of feedback. Some groups have adopted the model, but have changed the name. Examples include Sit Down & Write! Just Write! WEWRITE! and the Write Bunch

== Writing partners ==
In 2018 Rennie Saunders established a US-based 501(c)(3) not-for-profit, Writing Partners, in California to support Shut Up and Write! globally. In 2024, Writing Partners organised a symposium on Community in Writing at ThinkLab, Cambridge University, UK. In 2025, the Community in Writing symposium will take place in conjunction with Deakin University, Melbourne, Australia.
