= Andreas Loewe =

Australian Anglican priest

The Very Reverend Andreas Loewe FRHistS
- Dean of Melbourne
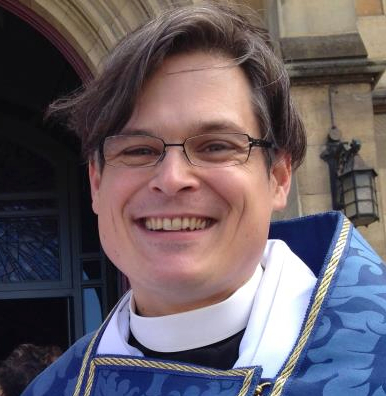
- Diocese: Diocese of Melbourne
- In office: 2012 - present
- Predecessor: Mark Burton
- Other posts: Chaplain, Trinity College Melbourne

Orders
- Ordination: 2001

Personal details
- Born: 27 February 1973 (age 53) Munich, Germany
- Denomination: Anglican
- Spouse: Katherine Firth
- Education: University of Oxford; University of Cambridge

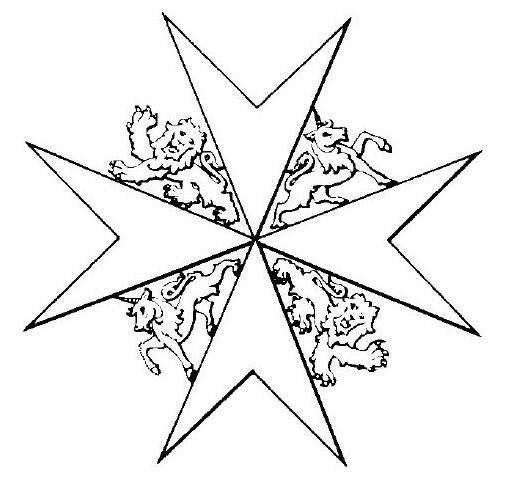
Badge of the Order of St John

Jost Andreas Loewe (born 27 February 1973) is an Australian Anglican priest. He has been the 15th Dean of Melbourne since 2012, the second-youngest dean in the history of the diocese.

An academic theologian and music historian, Loewe is also an honorary fellow and lecturer at the Melbourne Conservatorium of Music.

== Life and career ==
=== Education ===
Loewe was born in Munich, Bavaria. He was educated at the United World College of the Atlantic before attending St Peter's College, Oxford (BA 1995, MPhil 1997, MA 1999).

After further studies at Selwyn College, Cambridge, where he was Gosden Lay Chaplain, Loewe submitted for a Doctor of Philosophy (PhD) degree which was awarded in 2001.

=== Ministry ===
Loewe was ordained in 2001 at Christ Church Cathedral, Oxford. After a curacy in Upton-cum-Chalvey from 2001 to 2004, he was appointed associate vicar of St Mary the Great and chaplain of Michaelhouse, Cambridge, positions he held from 2004 to 2009 while also serving as a senior member of the Faculty of Divinity, University of Cambridge.

From 2009 to 2012, Loewe was chaplain and Gavan Lecturer in Theology at Trinity College, Melbourne. His academic research focuses on the Reformation in England and Germany as well as music history, in particular the works of Johann Sebastian Bach.

Loewe was installed as Dean of Melbourne at St Paul's Cathedral on 13 October 2012, "the second youngest of Melbourne’s 15 Deans in the 165-year history of the Diocese".

On 18 December 2012, Loewe officiated at the state memorial service celebrating the life of Dame Elisabeth Murdoch. On 15 December 2013, he officiated at a public commemoration of Nelson Mandela's life. On 24 July 2014, he led a multi-faith memorial service for those who died on Flight MH17. On 13 August 2014, he officiated at the installation of Philip Freier as Primate of Australia in the presence of Justin Welby, Archbishop of Canterbury.

=== Other ===
Loewe was elected as a fellow of the Royal Historical Society (FRHistS) in 2011, and was one of seven Rex Lipman Fellows who visited St Peter's College, Adelaide in 2012.

Loewe is an advocate for the rights of refugees and asylum seekers and has repeatedly called on the federal government to end offshore detention. In a letter to The Age newspaper in January 2014, he described Australia's refugee policy as "inhumane to those seeking our protection and demeaning to Australia". In August 2018 he became an ambassador of the Kids off Nauru initiative, advocating for the removal of children and their families from the Nauru Regional Processing Centre, and calling on Prime Minister Scott Morrison to "show compassion to the children held on Nauru and to end this tragedy".

== Honours ==
- Officer of the Order of St John (OStJ); appointed by Queen Elizabeth II in 2014 for services to St John Ambulance Australia, promoted to Commander in 2022.

Anglican Communion titles
Preceded by Mark Gregory Burton	Dean of Melbourne; 2012–present	Incumbent
