= Paul Barker (bishop) =

Australian Anglican bishop

The Right Reverend Paul Barker
- Assistant bishop (Jumbunna Episcopate), Anglican Diocese of Melbourne
- Church: Anglican Church of Australia
- Diocese: Melbourne
- Installed: 12 November 2016

Orders
- Ordination: 1990 (deacon and priest)
- Consecration: 12 November 2016 by Philip Freier

Personal details
- Denomination: Anglican
- Education: Ridley College (undergraduate theology); University of Bristol (PhD)

Paul Anthony Barker (born 1961) is an bishop in the Anglican Church of Australia. He has served as an assistant bishop in the Anglican Diocese of Melbourne, as the Bishop for the Jumbunna Episcopate (covering the outer southern and eastern suburbs of Melbourne), since November 2016.

Barker trained as an actuary before studying theology at Ridley College in Melbourne. He graduated in 1989 and was ordained as deacon and priest in 1990.

Barker then worked in parish ministry in Melbourne, serving as vicar of Holy Trinity Doncaster from 1996-2009, Archdeacon of Box Hill for eight years from 2001 and as a visiting lecturer at Ridley College for nearly 20 years. During this time, he spent 1993 to 1996 England completing a PhD at the University of Bristol on the book of Deuteronomy.

Between 2009 and 2016, Barker worked in south and southeast Asia, in roles including visiting scholar at Seminari Theoloji Malaysia and adjunct lecturer at Myanmar Evangelical Graduate School of Theology. He was also the Asian Regional Coordinator for Langham Preaching Scholar Care, in which role he trained preachers in the region, including India, Pakistan, Myanmar and Thailand. Upon returning to Australia, Barker became a Director of Langham Partnership Australia.

On 1 April 2016, Barker was appointed as an assistant bishop in the Diocese of Melbourne in charge of the Jumbunna Episcopate, replacing Paul White who moved to a part-time role as Assistant Bishop for Growth Areas Ministry. He was consecrated by Archbishop Philip Freier as bishop and installed on 12 November 2016.
