= John Burnett (priest) =

20th-century Australian Anglican priest

John Burnett was an Anglican priest in the second half of the twentieth century.

Scott was educated at the Australian College of Theology and ordained a deacon in 1953 and a priest in 1954. After a curacy at Thornbury he was the incumbent at Northcote from 1957 to 1960; and Swan Hill from 1960 to 1965. He was Archdeacon of St Arnaud from 1965 to 1968; and of The Murray from 1968 to 1969, then Archdeacon of Mallee (1969–70) and again of St Arnaud (1970–72).
