= Melville James =

Melville Charles James (13 May 1877 – 4 April 1957) was an Australian Anglican bishop. Ordained in 1902, he was vicar of St Peter's Ballarat and then the Archdeacon of Maryborough, then Ballarat, before his ordination to the episcopate.

Anglican Communion titles
Preceded by Inaugural appointment	Bishop of St Arnaud; 1926–1950	Succeeded by Allen Ernest Winter
