= Kate Prowd =

Anglican bishop

The Right Reverend Kate Prowd
- Assistant bishop (Oodthenong Episcopate), Anglican Diocese of Melbourne
- Church: Anglican Church of Australia
- Diocese: Melbourne
- Installed: 6 October 2018

Orders
- Ordination: 1986 (deacon); 1992 (priest)
- Consecration: 6 October 2018 by Philip Freier

Personal details
- Born: Catherine Jane Urwin
- Denomination: Anglican
- Spouse: Roger
- Children: 3
- Education: Trinity College, Melbourne

Catherine Jane "Kate" Prowd (née Urwin; born 1960) is an Australian bishop in the Anglican Church of Australia. She has served as an assistant bishop in the Anglican Diocese of Melbourne, as the Bishop for the Oodthenong Episcopate (which serves the northern and western areas of Melbourne as well as the city of Geelong), since October 2018.

== Biography ==
Prowd is the sister of Bishop Lindsay Urwin. They are believed to be the only brother-sister bishops in the entire Anglican Communion. Another brother is Michael Urwin, who was headmaster of Brighton Grammar School from 1996 to 2013 and has been the registrar of the Diocese of Melbourne since 2019.

Prowd completed a theological degree at Trinity College, Melbourne. She was ordained deacon in 1986 and priest in 1992. She served in parish ministry within the Diocese of Melbourne at Mount Waverley, Black Rock, Hampton and Gardenvale and in school chaplaincy at Christ Church Grammar School and Brighton Grammar School.

Prowd also lived in New Zealand for some time where she worked as a clinical psychologist in student health at Otago University before returning to Australia in 2004. She has maintained her registration as a psychologist in her role as bishop.

In 2018, Prowd was consecrated and appointed as an assistant bishop in the Diocese of Melbourne, replacing Philip Huggins who had reached retirement age.

Prowd was married to Roger, who was a priest, and has three daughters. Roger died in 2026.
