= Charles Godby =

Charles John Godby (1851–1919) was the Dean of Melbourne from 1914 until his death.

Godby was educated at Magdalene College, Cambridge and ordained in 1876. After a curacy in Newark he emigrated to Australia and was an incumbent in Seymour and Malvern, Victoria and also became a canon of St Paul's Cathedral, Melbourne in 1894.

He died in the final week of August 1919.

Religious titles
Preceded by Reginald Stephen	Dean of Melbourne; 1914–1919	Succeeded by John Stephen Hart
