= Alfred Ernest Floyd =

Dr. Alfred Ernest Floyd OBE
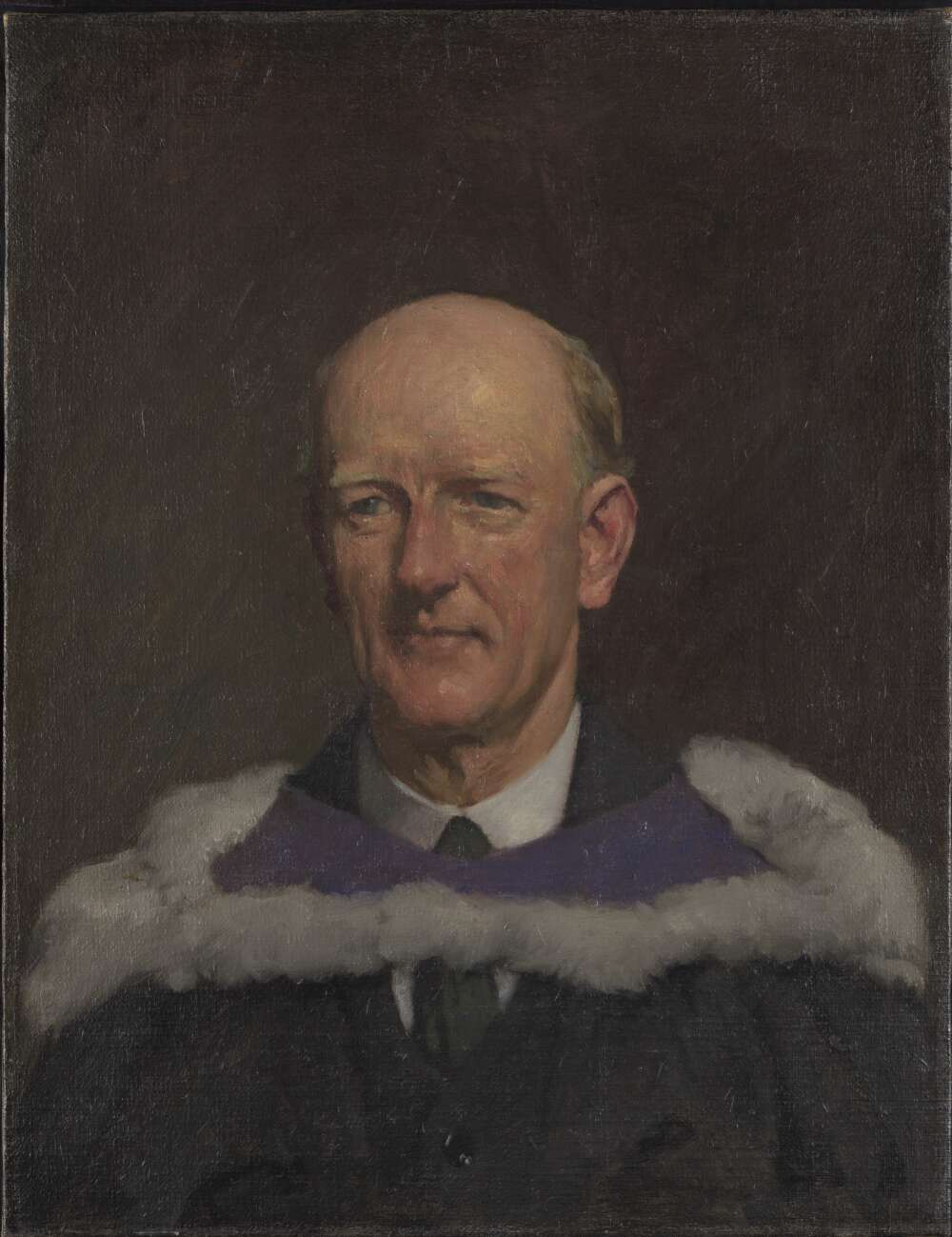
- Portrait of Dr. Alfred Ernest Floyd by Bernard Hall c. 1927

Background information
- Born: 5 January 1877
- Died: 13 January 1974 (aged 97)
- Instrument: organ

Alfred Ernest Floyd OBE (5 January 1877 - 13 January 1974) was an English-born organist and choirmaster in Australia, later known as a radio broadcaster. He has been described as Australia's oldest radio disc jockey when he retired at 95.

== Career ==
Born in Aston, Birmingham, England, in 1877, Floyd's family moved to Cambridge in 1890 where he attended the Leys School and became a pupil of the organist of King's College, Cambridge. He completed a bachelor of music degree at Oxford in 1912, doctor of music at Cambridge in 1918, and took the position of organist and choirmaster of St Paul's Cathedral in Melbourne, Australia, where he was employed between 1915 and 1947.

He lectured with the Workers' Educational Association and Council of Adult Education, and was music critic of The Argus newspaper. In the 1940s he worked for the Australian Broadcasting Commission (ABC), with his programme Music Lovers' Hour broadcast into the 1970s.

He was appointed an Officer of the Order of the British Empire (OBE) in 1948, and awarded an honorary Doctor of Letters and the ABC's Silver Medallion in 1971.

In July 1972, aged 95, Floyd announced he would be retiring from his radio programme after 28 years on air. He stayed on as a musical consultant for the ABC, and planned to broadcast again.

He died in Melbourne on 13 January 1974, eight days after his 97th birthday.
