= Allen Winter =

Allen Ernest Winter (8 December 1903 – 8 July 1997) was an Australia Anglican bishop. He was the long-serving second bishop of the former Diocese of St Arnaud in north-west Victoria.

Winter was educated at Melbourne Grammar School and University College, Oxford. He was ordained in 1928 and was a curate at Christ Church, South Yarra, and then St James' Ivanhoe. He then held incumbencies at Sunshine, Brighton and Essendon. From 1948 he was a canon residentiary at All Saints' Cathedral, Bathurst, until his ordination to the episcopate.

Church of England titles
Preceded by Melville Charles James	Bishop of St Arnaud; 1951–1973	Succeeded by David Hubert Warner Shand
