= St Paul's Cathedral, Melbourne =

Anglican cathedral in Australia

- Cathedral Church of Paul the Apostle
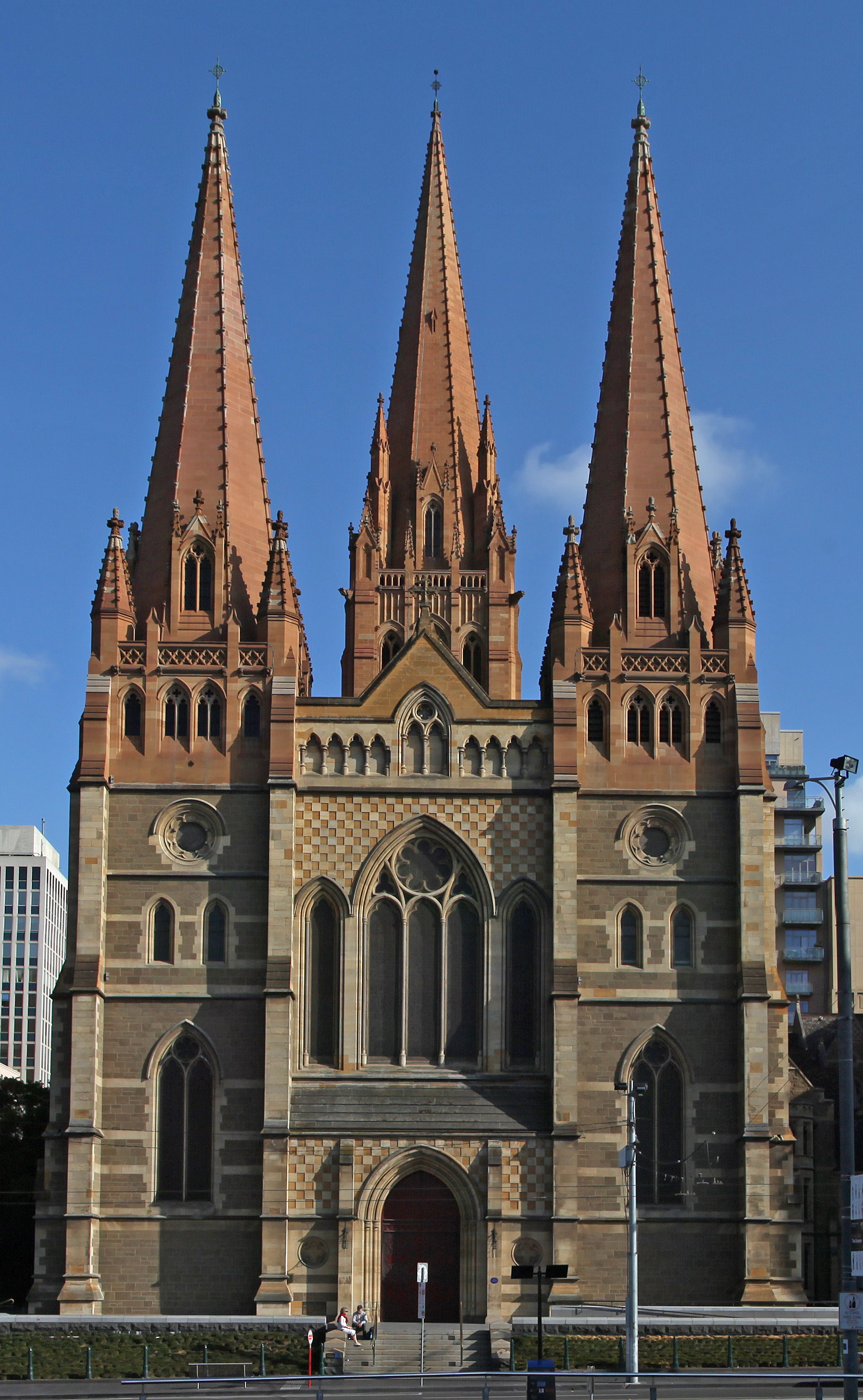
- St Paul's Cathedral
- St Paul's Cathedral, Melbourne
- 37°49′01″S 144°58′03″E
- Location: Melbourne CBD
- Country: Australia
- Denomination: Anglican Church of Australia
- Website: cathedral.org.au

History
- Former name: St Paul's Parish Church (1852–1885)
- Status: Active
- Consecrated: 22 January 1891

Architecture
- Architect: William Butterfield
- Style: Gothic Revival
- Years built: 1880–1891, 1926

Administration
- Province: Victoria
- Diocese: Melbourne

Clergy
- Archbishop: Ric Thorpe
- Dean: Andreas Loewe

Victorian Heritage Register
- Official name: St Pauls Cathedral Precinct
- Type: State Registered Place
- Designated: October 9, 1974
- Reference no.: H0018
- Heritage Overlay number: HO655

St Paul's Cathedral is an Anglican cathedral in Melbourne, Australia. It is the cathedral church of the Anglican Diocese of Melbourne and the seat of the Anglican Archbishop of Melbourne, who is also the metropolitan archbishop of the Anglican Province of Victoria.

The cathedral was designed by the English Gothic Revival architect William Butterfield and completed in 1891, except for the spires which were built to a different design from 1926 to 1932. It is one of Melbourne's major architectural landmarks.

== Location ==
St Paul's Cathedral is in a prominent location at the centre of Melbourne, on the eastern corner of Swanston and Flinders streets. It is situated diagonally opposite Flinders Street station, which was the hub of 19th-century Melbourne and remains an important transport centre. It is the largest Anglican Church in Australia.

Immediately to the south of the cathedral, across Flinders Street, is the new public heart of Melbourne, Federation Square. Continuing south down Swanston Street is Princes Bridge, which crosses the Yarra River, leading to St Kilda Road. Thus the cathedral has a dominating position from the southern approaches to the city.

The location for the cathedral marks the place of the first Christian service held in Melbourne in 1835. Previous buildings on this site include a corn market and St Paul's Parish Church.

== History ==
=== Early history ===
St Paul's Cathedral is built on the site where the first public Christian service in Melbourne was conducted in 1835. The block was then a government reserve far from the centre of town to the west, and used as a corn market. By 1848 the site was then adjacent to the first Princes Bridge across the Yarra River, and the prominent site was granted to the Anglican Church. The bluestone Church of St Paul the Apostle was consecrated in 1852.

Colonial artist Samuel Thomas Gill sketched St Paul's Church in 1854. A lithographic print titled 'St. Paul's Church Melbourne 1854' is part of his Sketches in Victoria album and was digitised by the National Library of Australia in 2021.

Nearly 30 years later with the huge growth of the city and Swanston Street becoming a major thoroughfare, the diocese decided to build a grand cathedral on the site to supersede the 1839 St James Old Cathedral located in the western end of the CBD. The English architect William Butterfield, known for his distinctive interpretation of the Gothic Revival, was commissioned to design the new cathedral. To fit the block, the cathedral is orientated in line with the central city grid, on the north–south axis, rather than facing east, the traditional direction. The foundation stone was laid in 1880 by the Governor of Victoria, John, Earl of Hopetoun (later Marquess of Linlithgow), in the presence of the Rt Revd Charles Perry, Bishop of Melbourne. On 22 January 1891 the cathedral (without the spires) was consecrated by the Rt Revd Field Flowers Goe, Bishop of Melbourne.

The building work was marked by disputes between Butterfield and the church authorities in Melbourne, leading to Butterfield's resignation in 1884. The job was then awarded to a local architect, Joseph Reed, who completed the building generally faithfully to Butterfield's design and who also designed the attached chapter house in matching style in 1889.

The pipe organ was commissioned from the English builder T. C. Lewis, one of the most prominent organ builders of the 19th century.

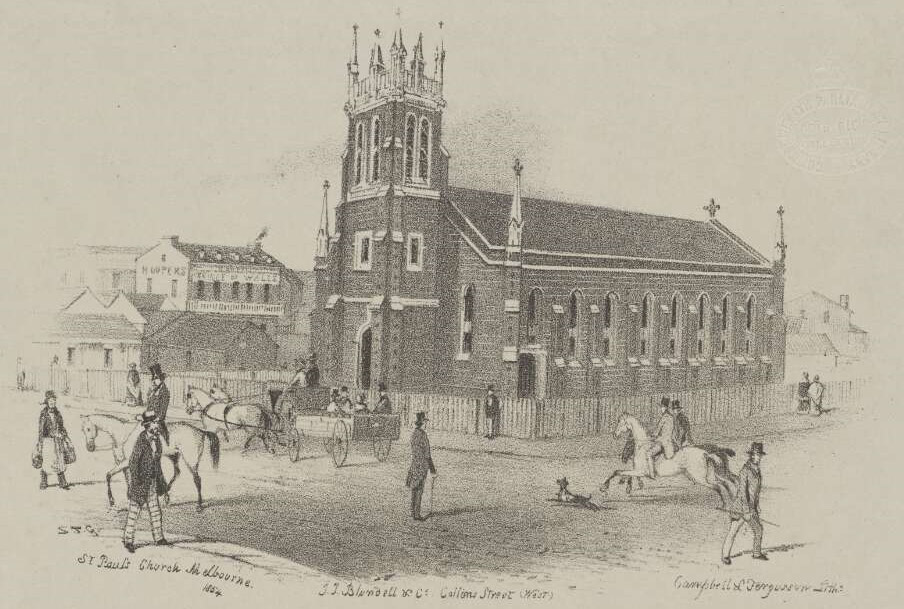
Lithographic print of the first St Paul's Church Melbourne 1854 by S. T. Gill

1862 lithograph of Melbourne from Princes Bridge, showing the first St Paul's Church

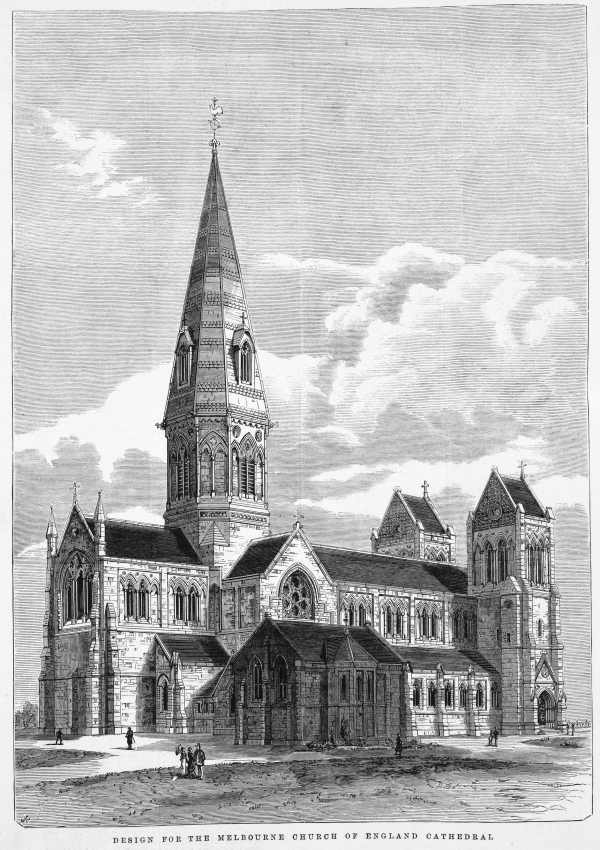
William Butterfield's original design for St Paul's Cathedral

=== 20th and 21st centuries ===
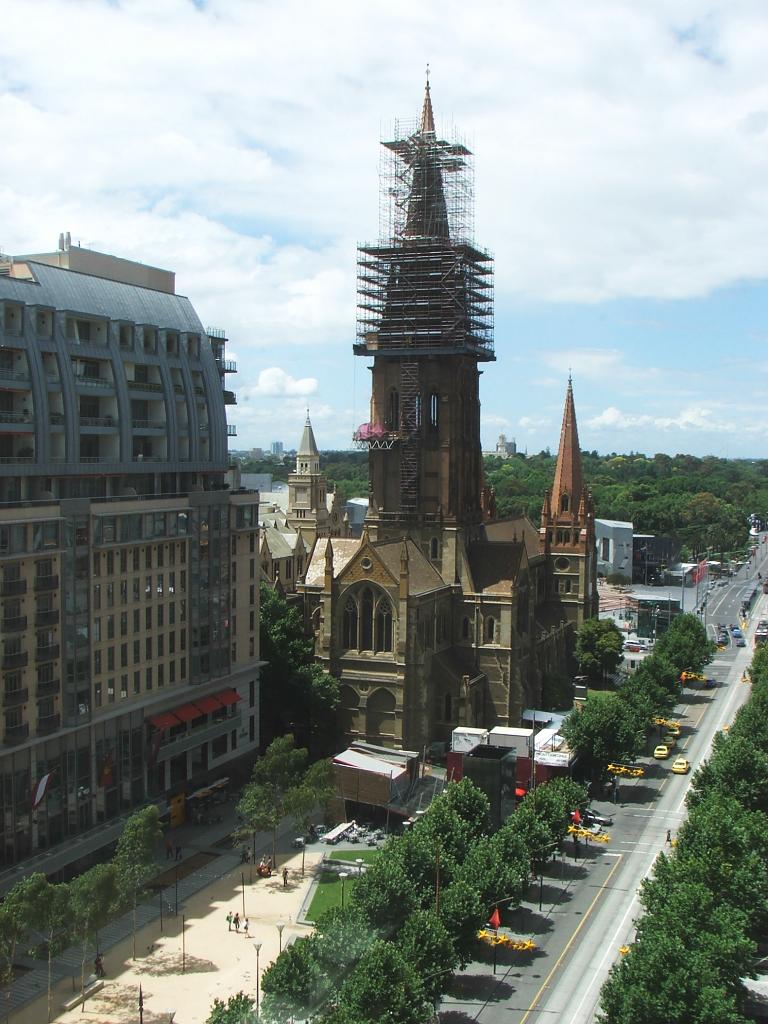
Repair work on the spires, 2004

For nearly 40 years, without the spires, the cathedral presented as a rather solid, horizontal mass, but was nevertheless the subject of postcards and photographs. In the early 1920s, having determined not to complete Butterfield's design, it was decided to hold a competition for the design of new spires. The winner, announced in Feb 1925, was John Barr, of Sydney, with a traditional Gothic Revival style, and the central spire much taller than the original design. Construction started in July 1926, using a stone from the Sydney area that was different to the original Barabool stone. The central tower was named the Moorhouse Spire, and reached its full height of 312 ft (95m) in 1932, and on 30 April 1933 a service of thanksgiving was held for its completion. The tower of St Paul's became the tallest structure in central Melbourne and dominated the city's skyline when viewed from the south.

While the towers were underway, additions were made to the Chapter House, enlarging the two storey section facing Flinders Street by one bay and one floor, in exactly matching stonework. The architects were Gawler & Drummond, and the works were done in 1926.

The 1960s saw extensive work completed to the exterior of the cathedral and in 1989 the organ was restored with the help of a major National Trust appeal. Further major restoration works were completed in 2009 with significant repairs to the spires, the installation of a coloured glass lantern in the Moorhouse Tower and coloured glass doors and a glass walled airlock at the Great West door.

The growth of multi-storey buildings in central Melbourne during the later 20th century robbed St Paul's of its claims to height, but with the retail heart height limit of 40m, it has retained its dominance of the immediate area. For about 30 years it was however somewhat dominated by the 16-storey Gas & Fuel buildings built along Flinders Street to the east in 1967, but demolished in 1997 to make way for Federation Square.

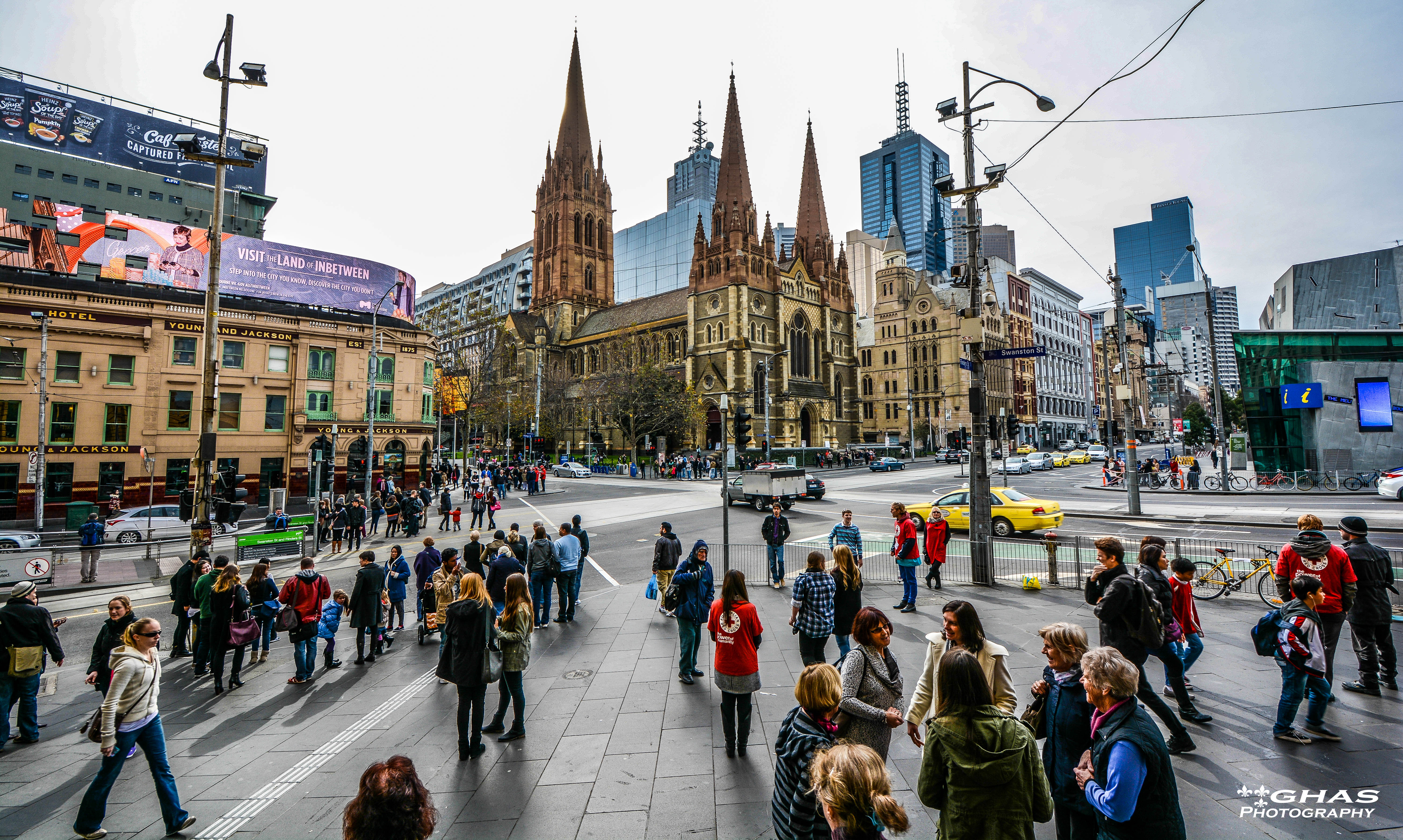
As seen from Flinders Street station

By the 1990s the constant traffic vibration in central Melbourne led to concerns about the structural soundness of the cathedral, particularly its spires. A public appeal, led by the then Dean of Melbourne, David Richardson, raised A$18 million to restore the spires and improve the interior of the building. The seven-year restoration project was completed in 2009, under the guidance of Falkinger Andronas Architects and Heritage Consultants (now Andronas Conservation Architecture). The restoration works were undertaken by Cathedral Stone and were acknowledged by the Australian Institute of Architects, the Victorian Chapter Heritage Architecture Award 2009 and the Lachlan Macquarie National Award for Heritage Architecture 2009.

As part of the work, stone heads of former dean David Richardson and philanthropist Dame Elisabeth Murdoch, created by Melbourne sculptor Smiley Williams and carved by stonemason Daryl Gilbert, were added to the spires and new dalle de verre glass was created by Janusz and Magda Kuszbicki for the west doors and the "Eighth Day" lantern in the Moorhouse Tower.

Besides Sunday and weekday Eucharists the cathedral "maintains the English tradition" of a daily choral Evensong, being the only Australian Anglican cathedral to do so.

== Architecture ==
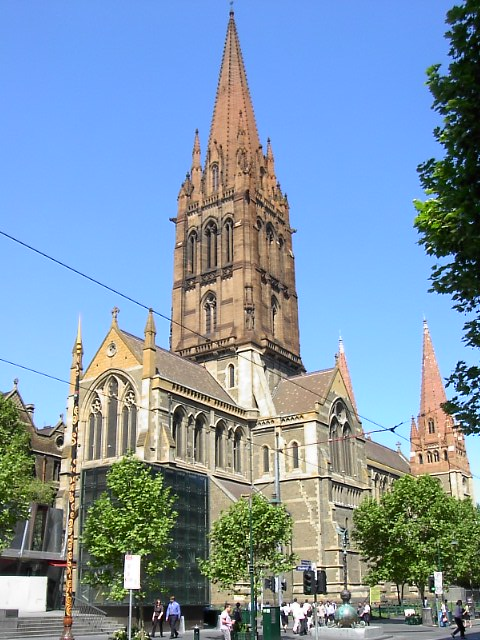
North aspect and spire

The plan of St Paul's is a traditional Latin cross, with a long nave, side aisles, short transepts, a tower at the crossing, with choir below, sanctuary and altar beyond, and a pair of towers framing the ceremonial main entrance.

The stonework is a mixture of sandstone from the Barrabool Hills and Waurn Ponds limestone, giving the cathedral a warm colouring, when most other grand 19th century public buildings are faced in lighter sandstone imported from other states. It is also quite different in appearance to the bluestone Gothic of St Patrick's Roman Catholic cathedral on the eastern hill of the city. Because the spires are built from Sydney sandstone and are 40 years newer, they are a different and darker colour than the older parts of the building.

The interior features rich colours and strident colour contrasts, characteristic of Butterfield's work, compared to the exterior. All the stonework is constructed of the Waurn Ponds limestone with contrasting stripes of the very dark-coloured local bluestone. The dado, floor, high altar and reredos are outstanding examples of High Victorian Gothic polychromy. The reredos is made from Devonshire marble, alabaster and glittering Venetian glass mosaics. One of the carved figures on the pulpit is said to be the image of a former Mayor of Melbourne's daughter who died in infancy. The floor is entirely paved with encaustic tile imported from the English firm of Maw & Co., featuring both patterned layouts and patterns within the tiles, while the dado is created with patterned glazed tiles.

In Persian tile on the rear wall of the narthex is a replica of an 8-pointed star found in two churches of the Anglican Diocese of Iran, the church of St Simon the Zealot in Shiraz and St Luke's Church in Isfahan. There are two baptismal fonts. The round font of Harcourt granite was installed when the cathedral was first built. In 1912 the immersion font was built in memory of Field Flowers Goe, third Bishop of Melbourne.

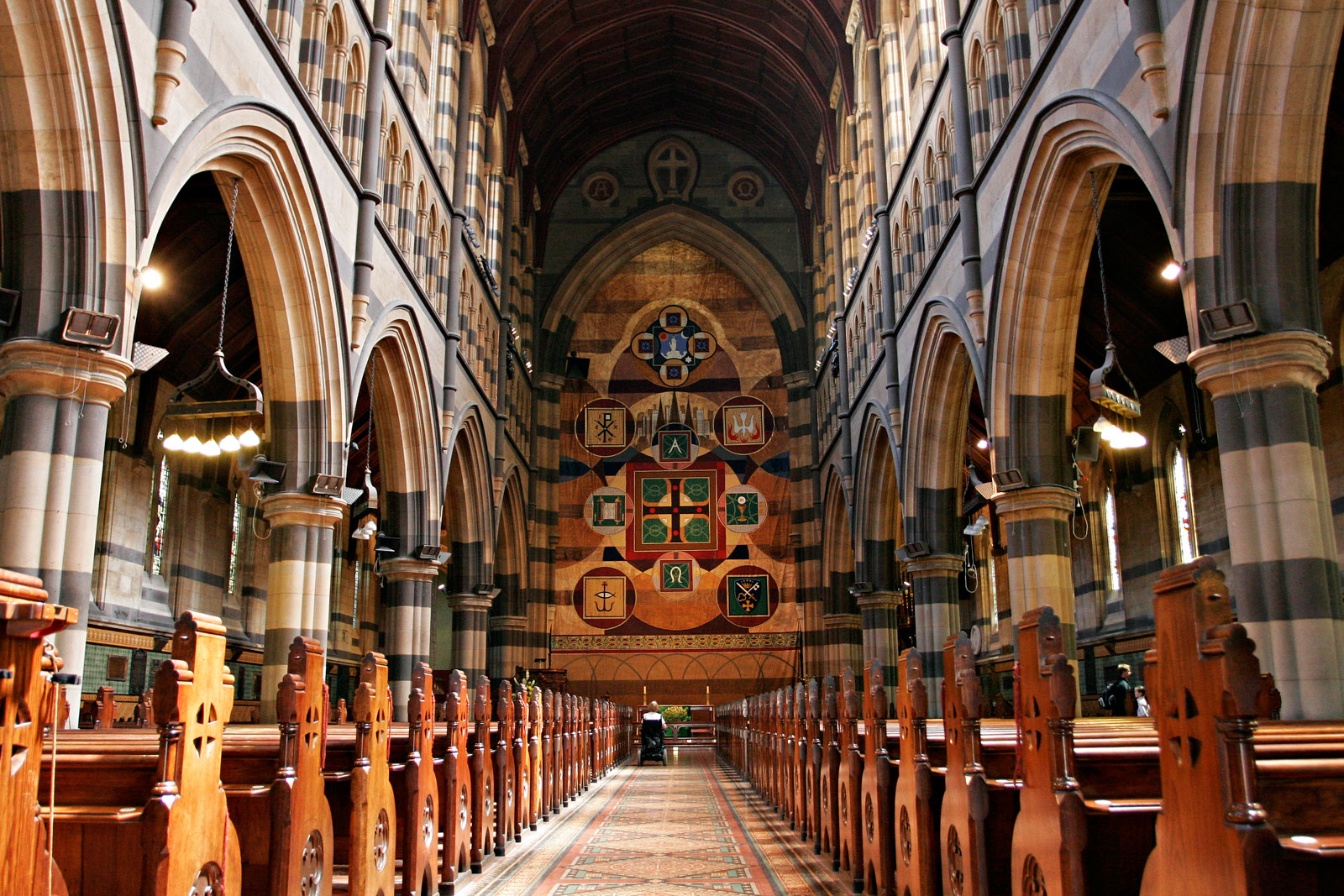
Interior of St Paul's

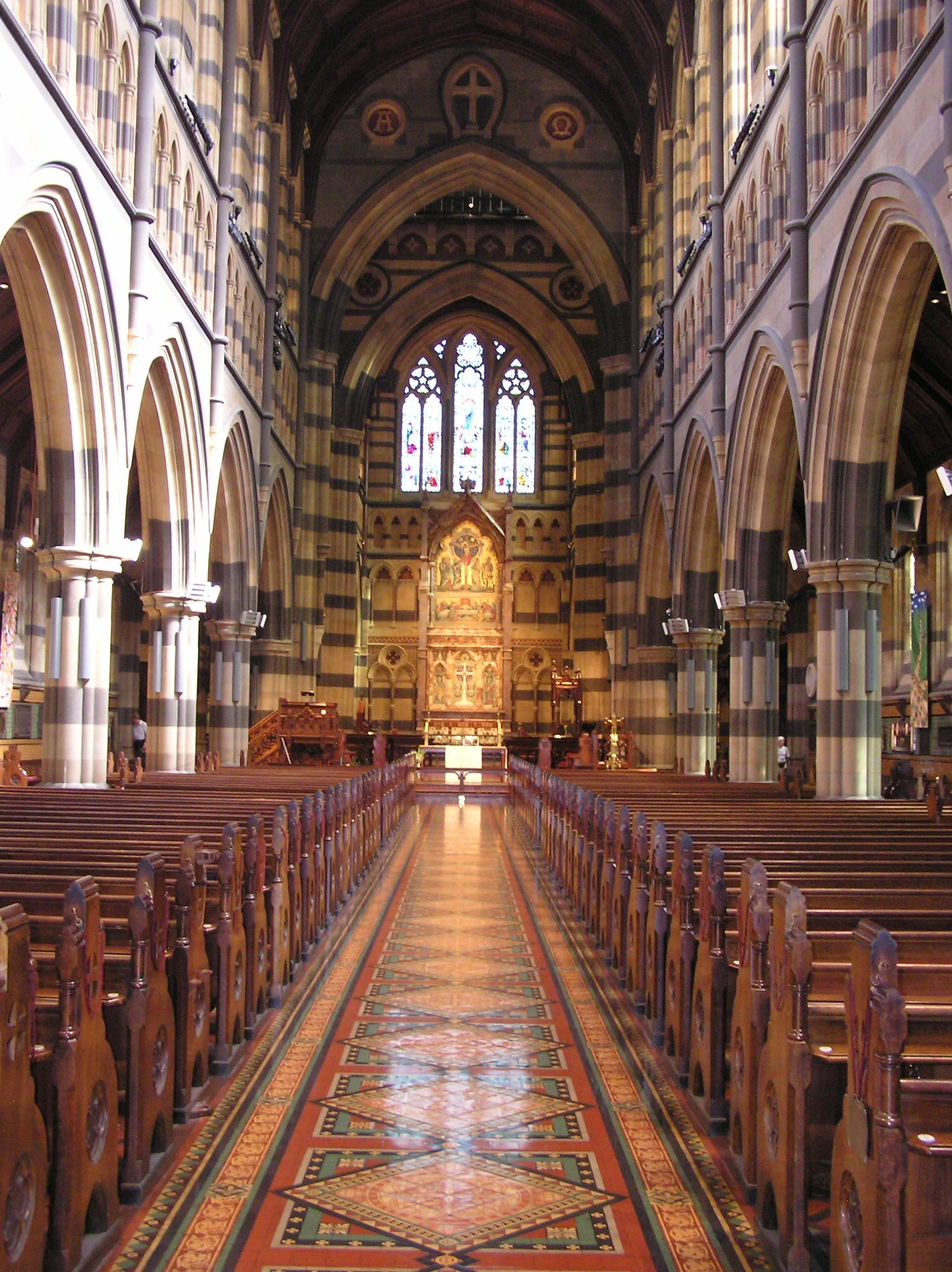
Interior looking down central aisle

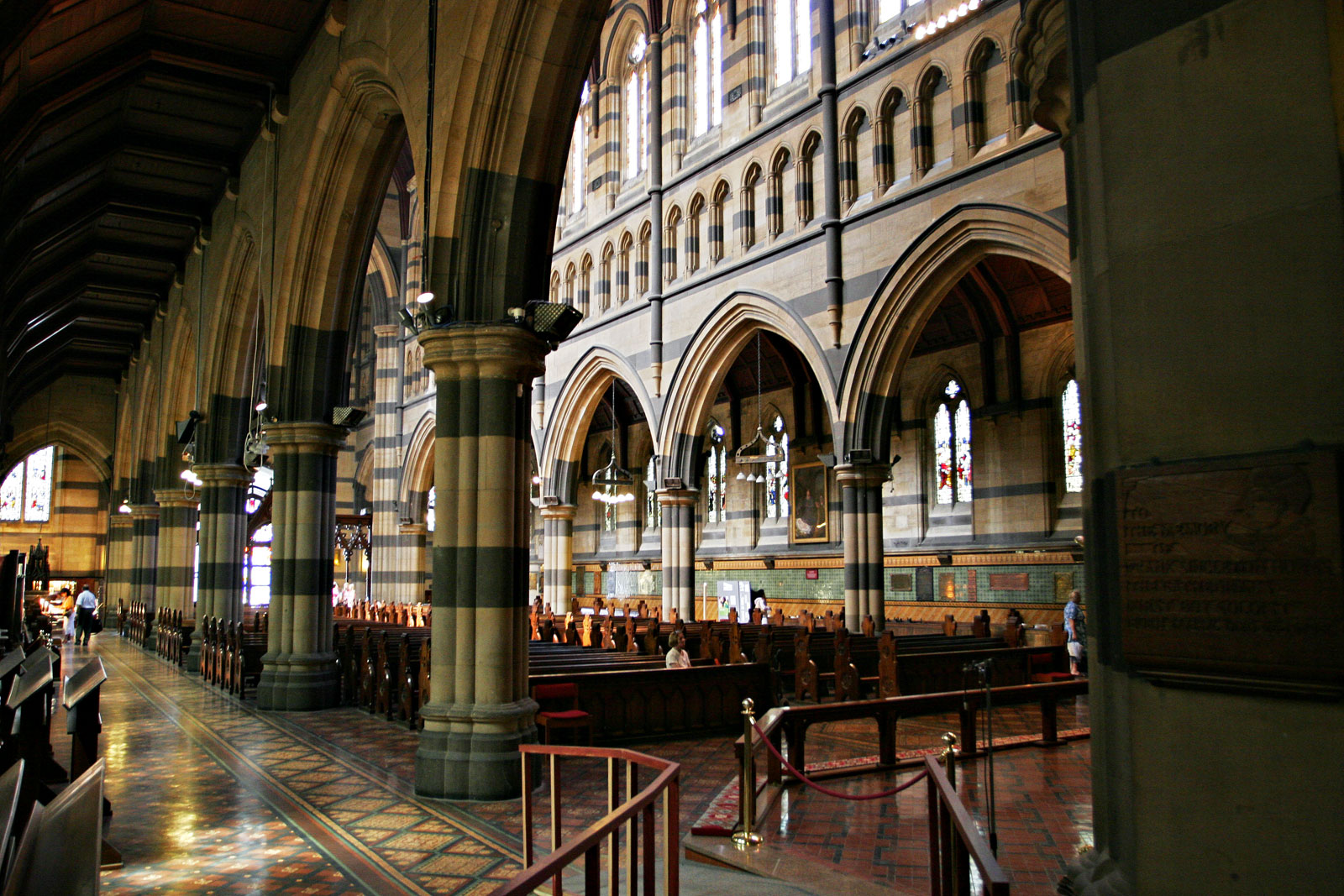
Interior from south aisle

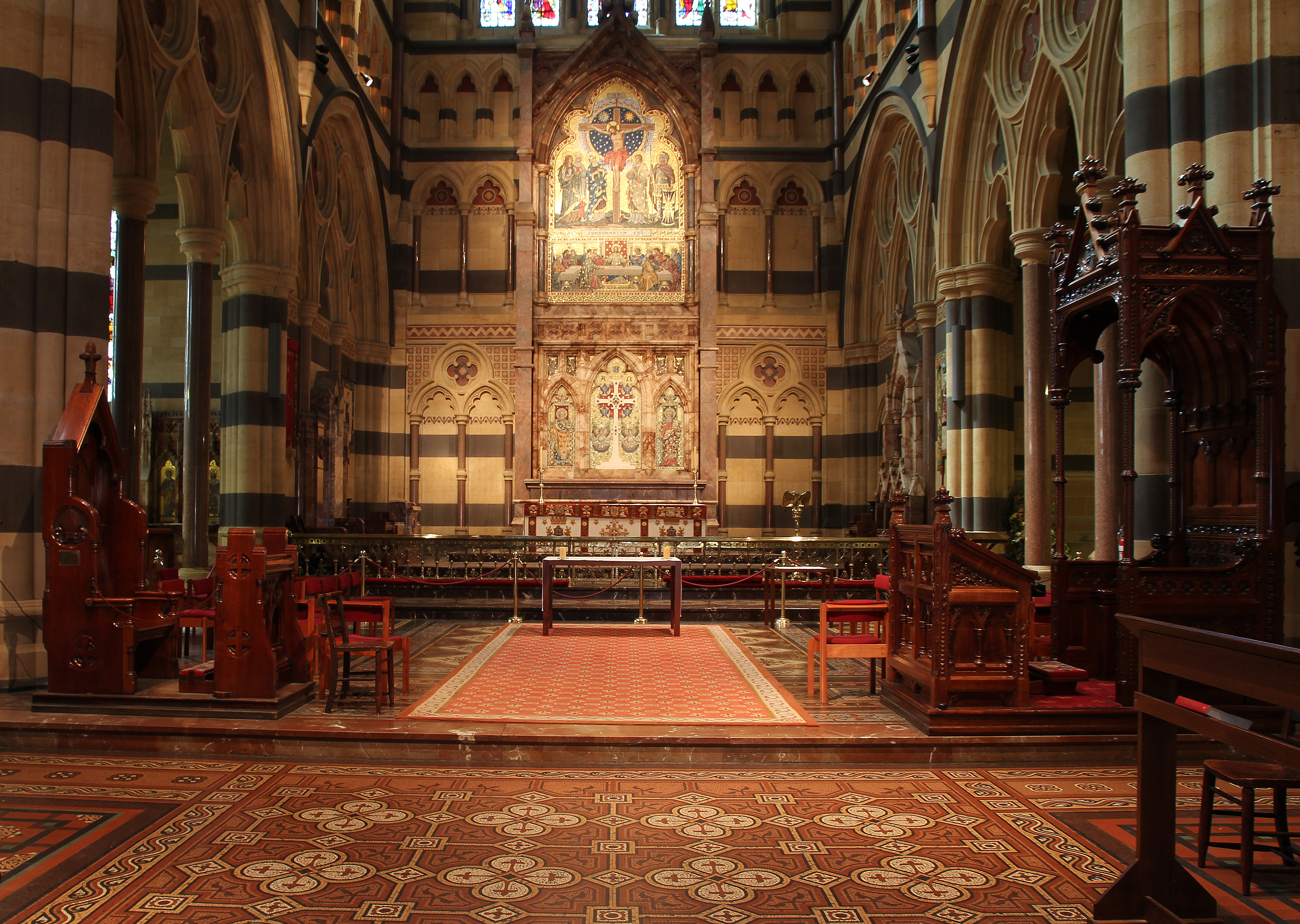
Sanctuary

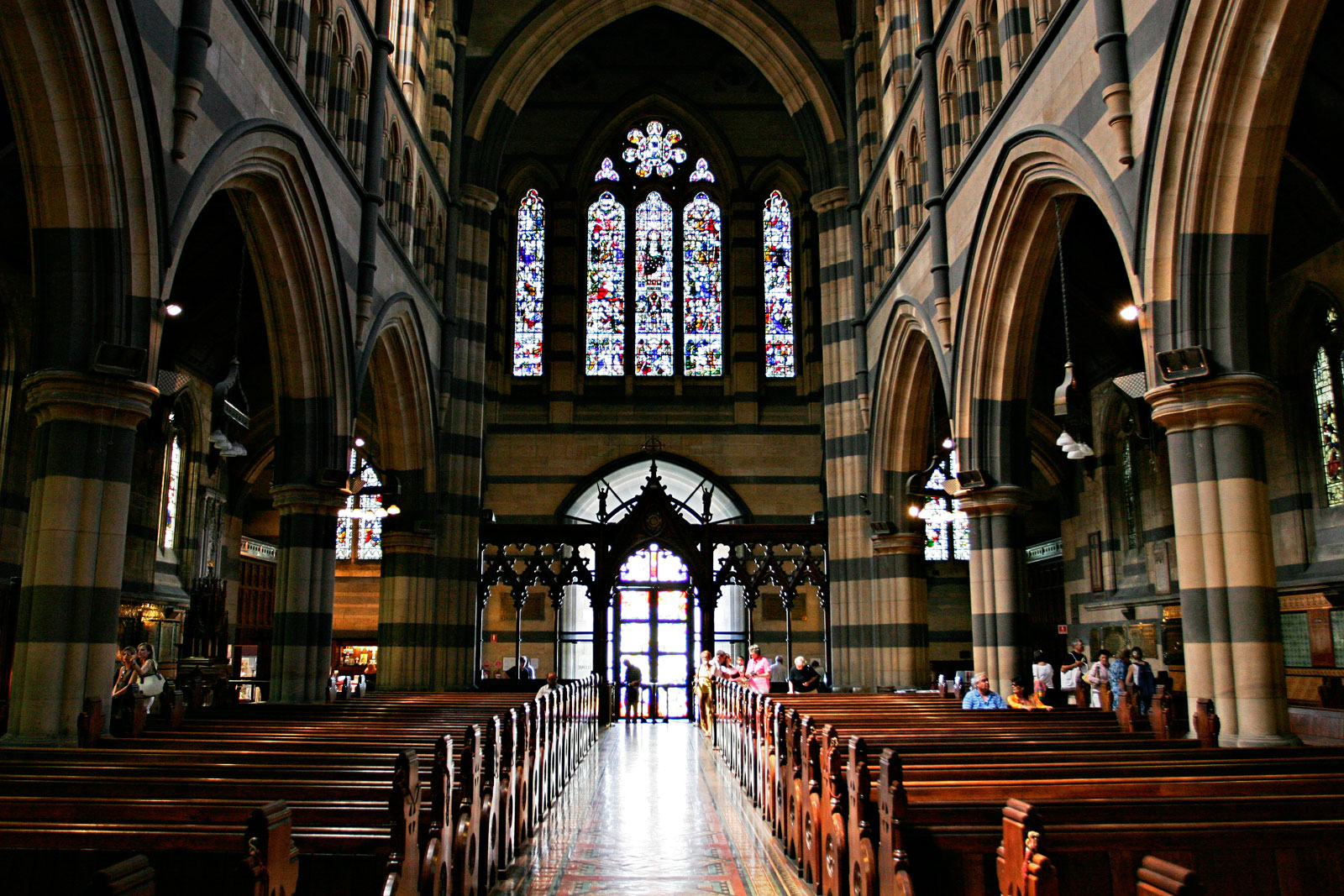
West end and door

== Deans ==
The dean of St Paul's Cathedral, who is responsible for its day-to-day running, is formally styled the "Dean of Melbourne":

- Hussey Burgh Macartney, 1852–1894 (Dean of St James's Cathedral)
- George Oakley Vance, 1894–1910
- Reginald Stephen, 1910–1914 (later Bishop of Newcastle, 1919)
- Charles John Godby, 1914–1919
- John Stephen Hart, 1919–1927 (later Bishop of Wangaratta, 1927)
- George Ellis Aickin, 1927–1932
- Frederick Waldegrave Head, 1934–1941 (concurrently archbishop)
- Henry Thomas Langley, 1942–1947
- Alfred Roscoe Wilson, 1947–1953
- Stuart Barton Babbage, 1953–1962
- Tom William Thomas, 1962–1984
- James Alexander Grant, 1985–1999 (formerly a coadjutor bishop)
- David John Leyburn Richardson, 1999–2008
- Mark Gregory Burton, 2008–2012 (formerly an assistant bishop in the Diocese of Perth)
- Andreas Loewe, 2012–present

== Precentors ==
- George Sutton, 1891–1899
- Alfred Wheeler, 1899–1908
- Henry Kelly, 1909–1922
- Richard Sherwood, 1922–1936
- Herbert Oliver Hole, 1936–1942
- Henry Hugh Girvan, 1954–1957
- Godfrey William Augustus Kirchner, 1957–1961
- Henry Hugh Girvan, 1961–1964
- David Arthur Sankey, 1964–1975
- Andrew Reginald St John, 1975–1978
- Albert Bayne Macpherson, 1978–1993
- Kenneth Ian Crawford, 1993–1997
- Noel Raymond Whale, 1997–2000
- Anne Wentzel, 2001–2008
- Rachel Margaret McDougall, 2008–2011
- Margaret Ruth Redpath, 2012–2013 (acting)
- Heather Jane Patacca, 2013–2024
- Tim Watson, 2025–

== Music ==
Music plays an integral part of worship at St Paul's, and the repertoire of Anglican church music can be heard during services. Music at the cathedral is the responsibility of the director of music and the music foundation, established in 1993, provides funding for the musical life of the cathedral.

=== Director of music ===
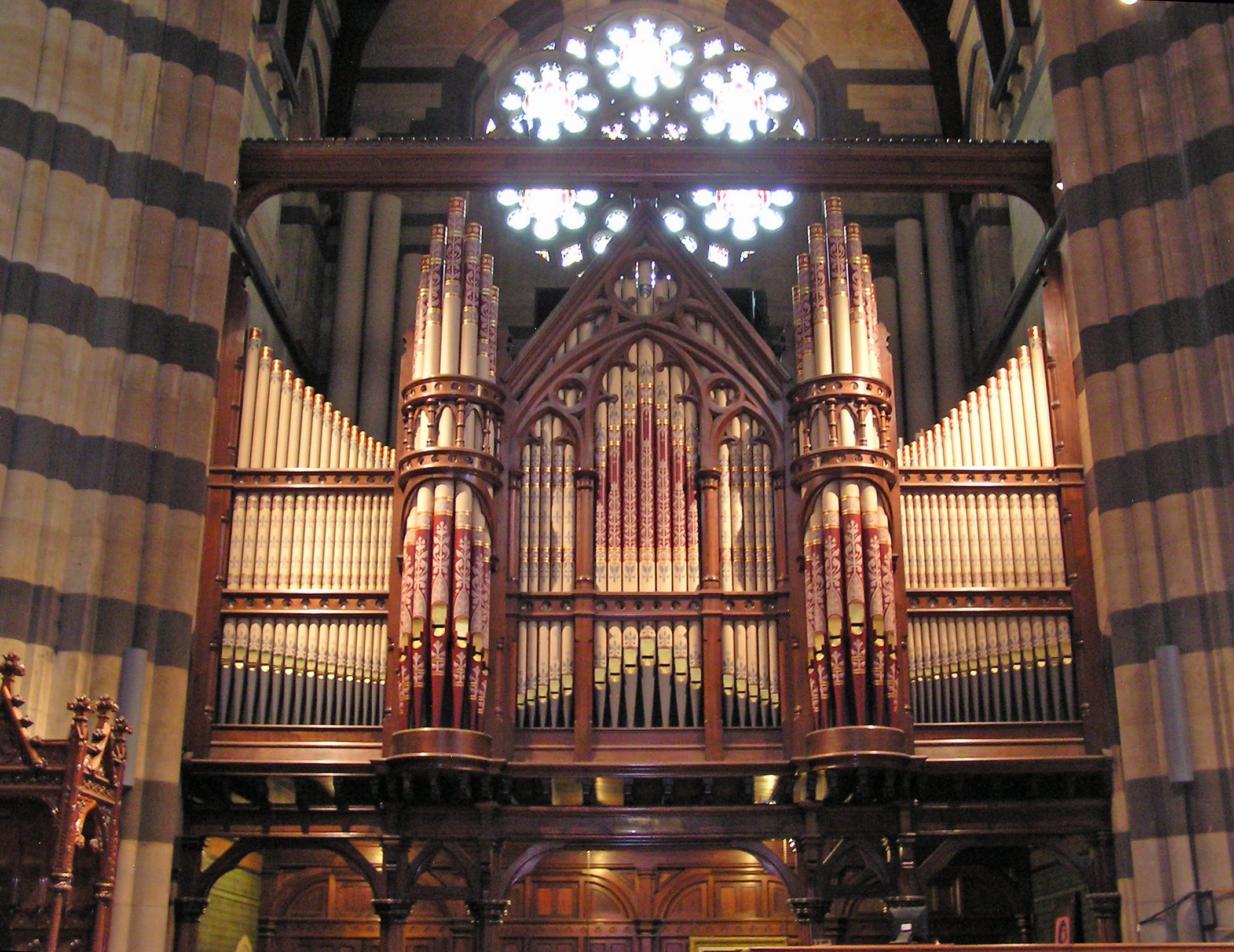
Organ

The director of music at St Paul's Cathedral, until the appointment of Philip Nicholls in 2013, was also the organist.

- Ernest Wood, 1888–1914
- A. E. Floyd, 1914–1947
- C. C. Campbell Ross, 1947–1951
- Lance Hardy, 1951–1973
- June Nixon AM, 1973–2013
- Philip Nicholls, 2013–present

A former director of music and organist, June Nixon, was awarded a Lambeth doctorate (DMus) by George Carey, Archbishop of Canterbury, in 1999. This recognised her long contribution to choral and organ music and marks the first woman to be so honoured.

=== Organ ===
The cathedral's pipe organ was built by T. C. Lewis and Co of Brixton, England. Over six and half thousand pounds were spent on its construction, shipping and installation before it was played at the cathedral's inaugural service in 1891. Various modifications and maintenance works have been carried out since then, culminating in an A$726,000 restoration which was completed in 1990 with the help of a National Trust appeal. In its restored state the organ has four manuals and pedals with 53 stops, all with electro-pneumatic action, and is housed in the cathedral's south transept behind newly stencilled façade pipes.

=== Choir ===
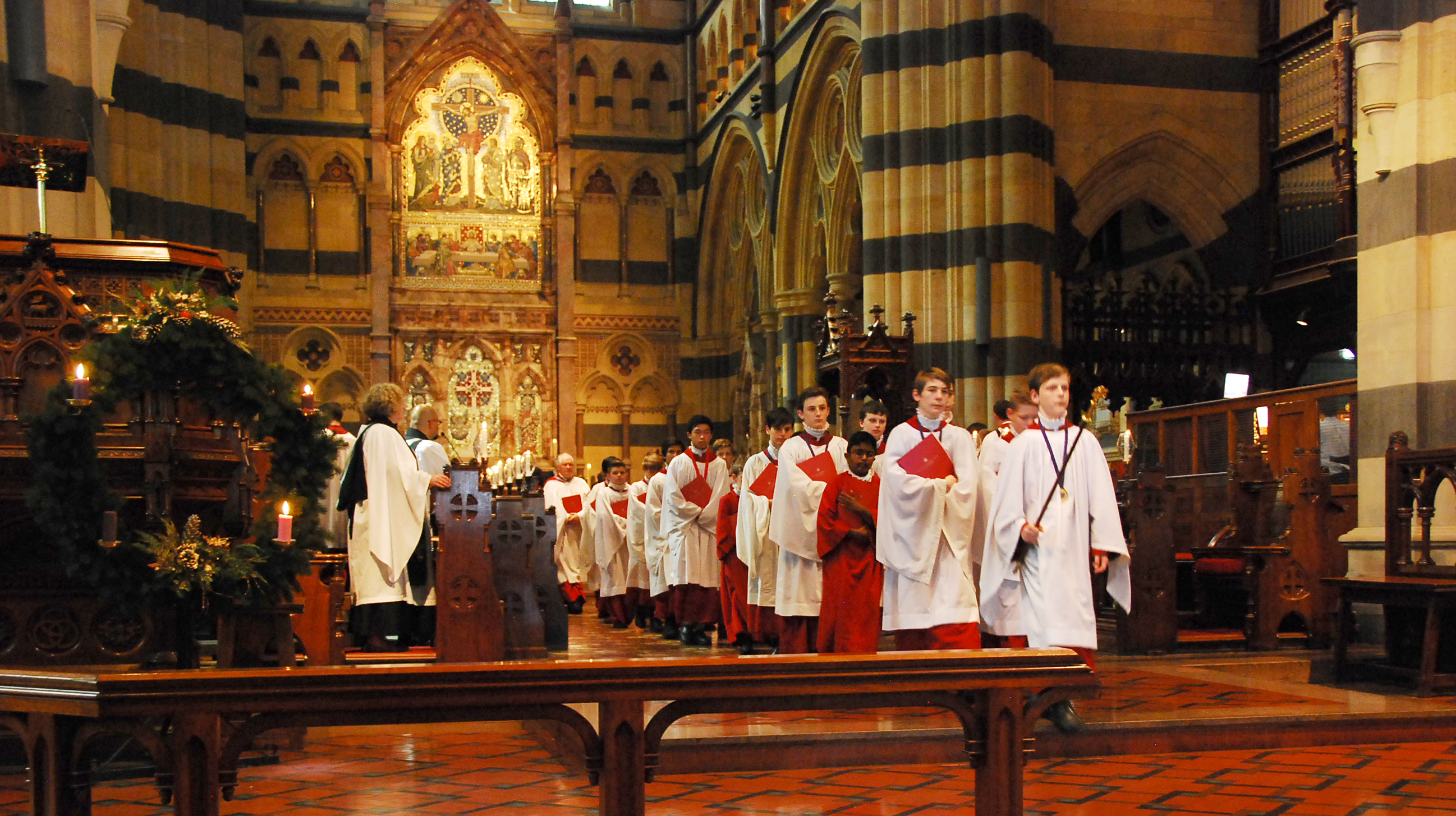
The choir in procession during a service at St Paul's Cathedral

Originally formed in 1888 in conjunction with the choir of All Saints' St Kilda, the cathedral choir led the procession for the official opening in 1891. The choir sings at Evensong throughout the week and for two of the four Sunday services. The choir is also called upon for special occasions including chapter Evensongs, synod services, state funerals, concerts, carol services and seasonal services.

Since the early 1990s the choir cassocks are of a deep burgundy colour, matching the stencil design hue on the organ pipes. Originally the choir wore traditional black cassocks and white surplices, but with the introduction of An Australian Prayer Book in the late 1970s, new cassocks of a green colour approximating that of the new prayer book cover (and coincidentally, that of the visible organ pipework at the time) were introduced and surplices were discontinued. On a visit to the cathedral in 1985 by the then Archbishop of Canterbury, a somewhat astonished Robert Runcie exclaimed that he had "never seen a cathedral choir wearing green robes before". With the restoration of the organ in the early 1990s, surplices were restored and cassocks of a deep burgundy were introduced matching the new stencil design hue on the organ pipes.

Unique to St Paul's Cathedral is the boys choir role of "Dean's Chorister" created by David Richardson when Dean of Melbourne. The Dean's Chorister primarily has the role of leading the choir with the "virge" or ceremonial mace, a task formerly performed by the head chorister.

In 2016, the 125th anniversary of the cathedral's consecration, the Girls' Voices of the Cathedral Choir were established and female lay clerks were also permitted to join the choir. The Girls' and Boys' Voices now sing the same number of services per week, and take an equal share in the musical life of the cathedral.

=== Belfry ===
St Paul's has a ring of 12 bells set for change ringing in the key of C♯, with an extra bell to allow different subsets of the full number to be rung still to a diatonic scale. All 13 bells were cast by Mears & Stainbank of Whitechapel Bell Foundry in 1889. The tenor originally weighed 31cwt but after the whole set was sent to Taylor's Bell Foundry in 1963 for retuning it now weighs 29cwt.

The bells were a gift from Thomas Dyer Edwardes and were dedicated and first rung on 15 November 1889 for the departure of the Governor of Victoria, Sir Henry Loch (later Baron Loch). The St Paul's Cathedral Society of Bellringers was founded in 1896 and are affiliated with the Australian and New Zealand Association of Bellringers.

== Significant occasions ==
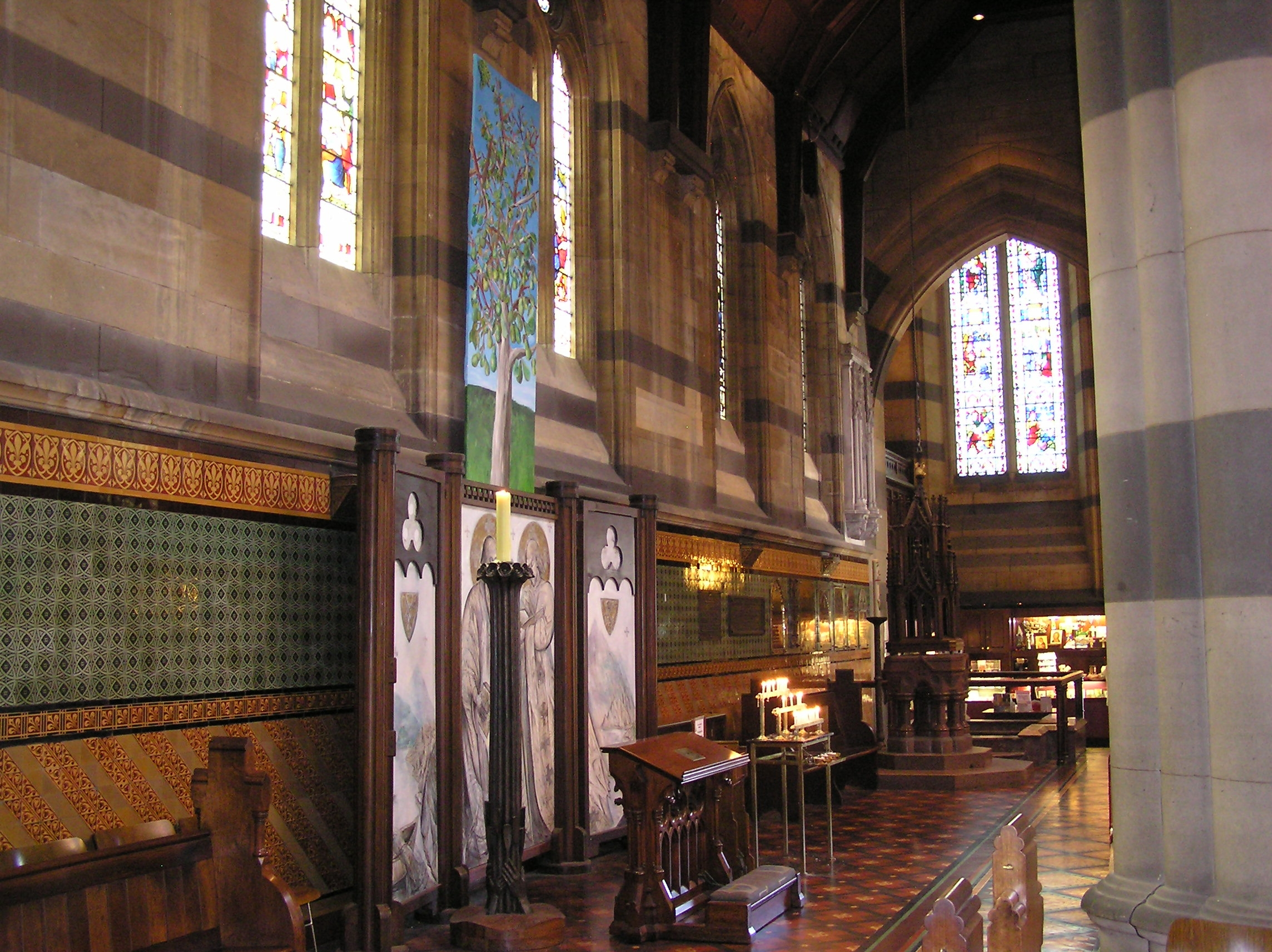
Chapel of Unity (commemorating the visit of Pope John Paul II)

St Paul's Cathedral has hosted many significant occasions in national, Commonwealth and international history. St Paul's continues to be the choice venue for many state funerals and has played host to those of many prime ministers, premiers, governors, governors-general and other significant people.

=== Papal visit ===
On 28 November 1986, on his arrival in Melbourne, Pope John Paul II paid a visit to St Paul's Cathedral in recognition of the dialogue between the Anglican and Roman Catholic churches in Melbourne fostered by their respective former archbishops, the Most Reverend Sir Frank Woods (Anglican) and the Most Reverend Sir Frank Little (Roman Catholic).

The cathedral choir sang "Ecce vicit Leo" as the Pope entered the cathedral. After this the Pope prayed for Christian unity and lit a metre-long candle. A memorial chapel (pictured right) commemorates this historic occasion: only the third time in four centuries when a reigning Pope had made an official visit to an Anglican cathedral.

=== Christmas carol service recording ===
On 28 November 2007, a carol service called Carols from St Paul's Cathedral Melbourne featuring the choir was recorded by the Australian Broadcasting Corporation and broadcast Australia-wide on Christmas Eve.

== Services ==
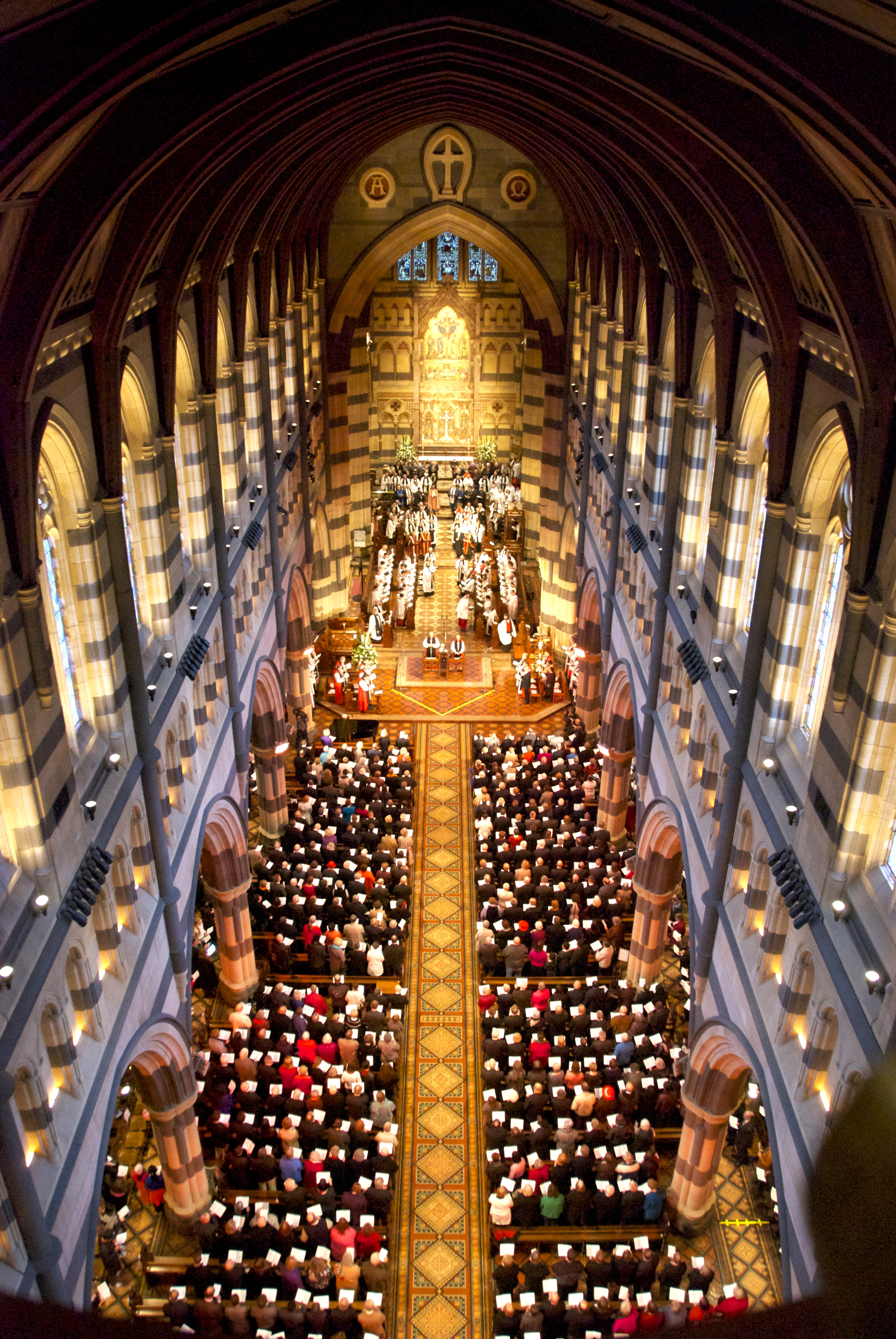
A Sunday service at St Paul's

=== Sunday ===
- 8.00 am Holy Communion (1662 Book of Common Prayer)
- 10.00 am Choral Eucharist (A Prayer Book for Australia)
- 4.00 pm Choral Evensong

=== Monday ===
- 12.15 pm Eucharist
- 5.10 pm Evening Prayer in Simple English

=== Tuesday to Friday ===
- 12.15 pm Eucharist
- 5.10 pm Choral Evensong (Evening Prayer during school holidays)

=== Public holidays ===
- 12.15 pm Eucharist

== See also ==
- St Paul's Cathedral
- List of cathedrals in Australia
