= Tom Thomas (priest) =

Tom William Thomas CBE (14 May 1914 – 17 August 1999) was the Anglican Dean of Melbourne from 1962 to 1984.

Thomas was born in Brisbane but raised in Victoria. He attended Kyneton High School and then studied theology at Ridley College. He was ordained in 1941. After a curacy in Geelong he was a chaplain in the AIF from 1942 to 1946. He was then the incumbent at Doncaster before becoming Archdeacon of Brighton in 1959. Thomas was appointed Dean of Melbourne in 1962, and in that capacity led the memorial service for Harold Holt, which was held at St Paul's Cathedral on 22 December 1967. He was appointed a Commander of the Order of the British Empire in the 1971 New Year Honours. In retirement he ministered at Mount Martha.

Religious titles
Preceded by Stuart Barton Babbage	Dean of Melbourne; 1962–1984	Succeeded by James Alexander Grant
