= Anthony Brownless =

Australian physician and educator (1817–1897)

Sir Anthony Colling Brownless, KCMG, KSG, FRCS (19 January 1817 – 3 December 1897) was an English-Australian physician and educationist, chancellor of the University of Melbourne.

== Biography ==
Brownless was the only son of Anthony Brownless, of Paynetts House, and Bockingfold Manor, near Goudhurst, Kent. After studying for the medical profession at St. Bartholomew's Hospital in London, and at the University of Liège, he was admitted M.R.C.S. of London in 1841, and M.D. of St Andrews in 1846. Brownless practised for some years as a physician in London. Brownless probably suffered from tuberculosis; it's almost certain the state of his health made him decide to come to Australia. He left Liverpool as medical officer aboard the Chaseley and arrived in Melbourne, Victoria in December 1852.

Dr. Brownless arrived in Victoria in December 1852, and was soon afterwards elected Physician to the Melbourne Benevolent Asylum, and in 1854 Physician to the Melbourne Hospital—a post which he held for twelve years, being appointed a Life Governor and Consulting Physician on his retirement. In June 1855 the Melbourne University gave him the diploma of M.D., this being the first occasion on which the degree was conferred by that University, in which Dr. Brownless founded the medical school, and of which he was annually elected Vice-Chancellor for twenty-nine years, from 1858 to 1887; when he was elected Chancellor, in succession to Dr. James Moorhouse. Dr. Brownless held the honorary degree of LL.D. of the Universities of St. Andrews and Melbourne, and in 1884 he was elected a Fellow of the Royal College of Surgeons of England. Dr. Brownless was made, a Knight of St. Gregory the Great by the Pope in 1870, and a Knight Commander of the Order of Pius IX, conferring nobility, by Leo. XIII. in 1883. Dr. Brownless, who was created C.M.G. in May 1888, has been twice married: first, in 1842, to Ellen, daughter of the late William Hawker, M.D., of Charing, Kent, and Liège, Belgium, formerly surgeon in the Grenadier Guards, who died in 1846; and secondly, in 1852, to Anne Jane, eldest daughter of the late Captain William Hamilton, of Eden, County Donegal, Ireland, an officer in the Rifle Brigade, who served with distinction in the Peninsular War.

Brownless died in Melbourne on 3 December 1897 at the university and was buried in the Melbourne General Cemetery.

Academic offices
Preceded by Rt Rev. James Moorhouse	Chancellor of the University of Melbourne; 1887 – 1897	Succeeded by Sir John Madden
Preceded by Hugh Childers	Vice-Chancellor of the University of Melbourne; 1858 – 1887	Succeeded by Martin Irving
