= Frederic Morgan-Payler =

Frederic Trafford Morgan Payler (1872–1954) was an Anglican priest in the last decade of the 19th century, and the first half of the 20th century.

Morgan-Payler was educated at Brasenose College, Oxford and ordained deacon in 1896 and priest in 1897. He served curacies in Croydon, Westbourne, Frome and Midsomer Norton. Arriving in Australia he was first at Hobart then Ballarat. He was Archdeacon of The Murray from 1928 to 1930; and Archdeacon of St Arnaud from 1930 to 1935. In retirement he lived at Geelong.
