= John McKie (bishop) =

Australian Anglican clergyman

John David McKie (14 May 1909 – 30 March 1994) was a 20th-century Anglican bishop in Australia.

McKie was born in Melbourne was educated at the city's grammar school, Trinity College, Melbourne and New College, Oxford. He was ordained deacon in 1932 and priest in 1934. He was on the staff of Church of England Grammar School, Geelong from 1933 to 1935; and of Trinity College, Melbourne from 1936 to 1940, McKie was a chaplain to the Second Australian Imperial Force during World War Two. When peace returned he was the incumbent at Christ Church, South Yarra. He was appointed coadjutor of Melbourne in 1946, with the additional title of archdeacon of Melbourne, posts he held until 1960. In 1950 he was appointed a sub-prelate of the Venerable Order of Saint John. He married Mary Goodwin in 1952: they had four daughters. He held incumbencies at Berkswell from 1960 to 1966; and at Great with Little Packington from 1966 to 1971: during this period he was also an assistant bishop in the Diocese of Coventry.

Bishop of Geelong and Archdeacon of Melbourne; became Assistant Bishop of Coventry. John David McKie (14 May 1909 – 30 March 1994) was made deacon in 1932 and ordained priest in 1934, serving his title as a school chaplain in Melbourne.
