= Genieve Blackwell =

Australian Anglican bishop (born 1962)

The Right Reverend Genieve Blackwell
- Assistant bishop (Marmingatha Episcopate), Anglican Diocese of Melbourne
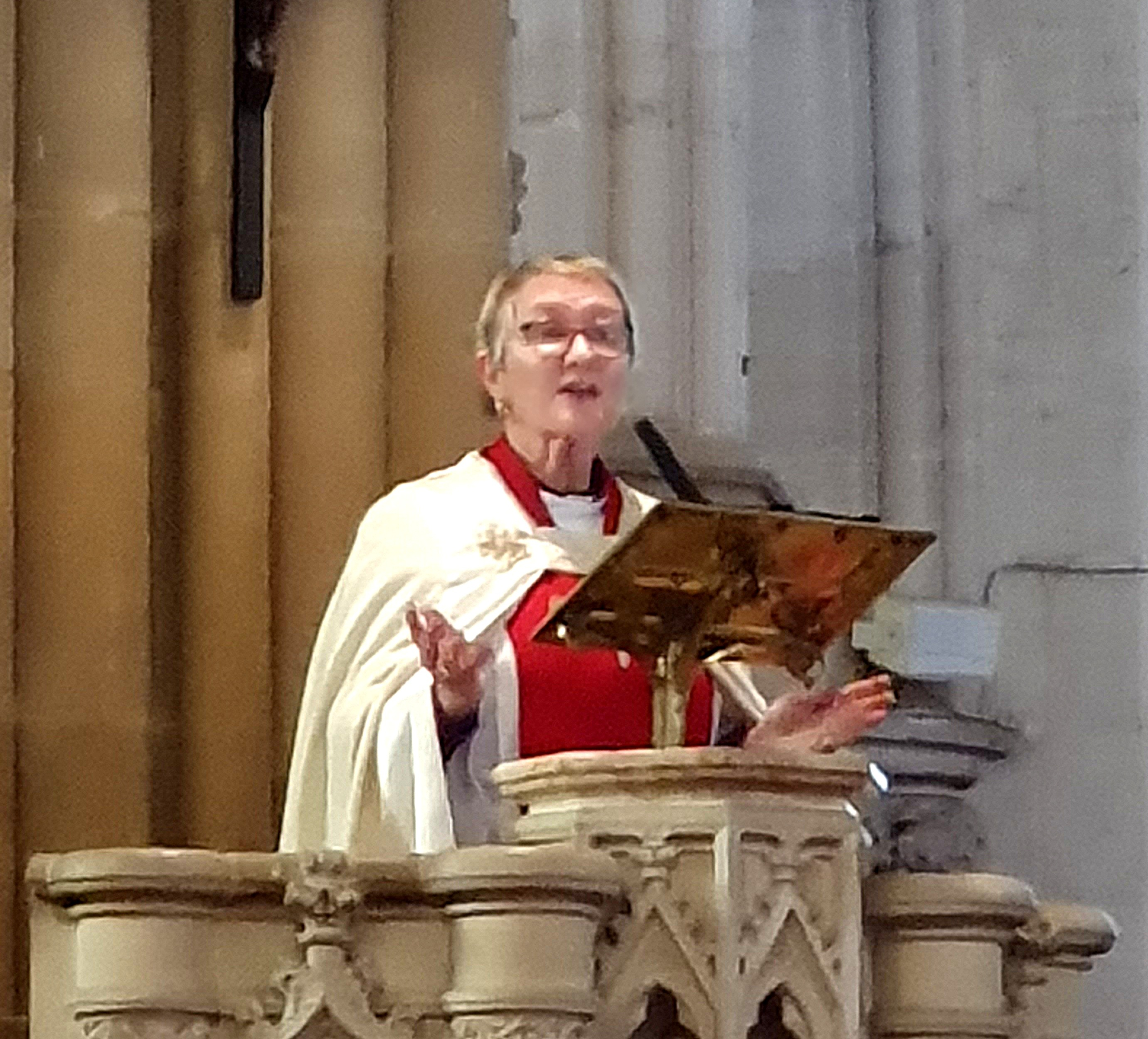
- Genieve Blackwell preaching the sermon at the consecration of Vanessa Bennett as Bishop in the Anglican Diocese of Canberra-Goulburn
- Church: Anglican Church of Australia
- Diocese: Melbourne
- Installed: 19 June 2015
- Other posts: Assistant bishop, Canberra and Goulburn, (2012–2015)

Orders
- Ordination: 1993 (deacon); 1998 (priest)
- Consecration: 31 March 2012 by Brian Farran

Personal details
- Born: 1962 (age 63–64)
- Denomination: Anglican
- Spouse: John Silversides
- Children: 2
- Education: Moore Theological College

Genieve Mary Blackwell (born 1962) is an Australian Anglican bishop who has served as an assistant bishop in the Diocese of Melbourne since June 2015, and previously served as an assistant bishop in the Diocese of Canberra and Goulburn from 2012 to 2015. She was the first woman to be consecrated as a bishop in the state of New South Wales and the third in Australia.

== Early life and family ==
Blackwell is the daughter of a Methodist minister. She was born in Western Australia and her family subsequently moved to the Wagga Wagga district in New South Wales. She is married to John Silversides, a retired prison chaplain, and has two adult children.

== Training and ministry ==
After attending the University of Sydney, where she became an Anglican, Blackwell studied at Moore Theological College from 1989 to 1992. She was ordained deacon in the Diocese of Sydney in 1993 and was subsequently ordained priest in the Diocese of Bathurst in 1998 where she ministered in the parishes of Gulgong and Grenfell. She moved to Yass in the Diocese of Canberra and Goulburn in 2005. From 2007 to the time of her appointment as bishop she was Archdeacon for Rural Ministry with the particular responsibility of ministering to clergy in the mainly rural diocese during a long period of drought.

On 3 December 2011, her appointment as an assistant bishop in the Diocese of Canberra and Goulburn was announced. She was consecrated on 31 March 2012, and commissioned as Regional Bishop of Wagga Wagga at a service held at St Saviour's Cathedral, Goulburn. Blackwell was consecrated by the Bishop of Newcastle, Brian Farran, as the then Archbishop of Sydney, Peter Jensen, was opposed to the ordination of women as priests and bishops. Blackwell was also appointed as the rector of the parish of Turvey Park, a suburb of Wagga Wagga.

On 19 December 2014, it was announced that Blackwell had been appointed an assistant bishop in the Diocese of Melbourne. She was commissioned on 19 June 2015 as assistant bishop with responsibility for parishes in the city and eastern suburbs, now called the Marmingatha episcopate.
