= Anglican Diocese of Melbourne =

Diocese of the Anglican Church of Australia in Victoria

Diocese of Melbourne
- Coat of arms

Location
- Ecclesiastical province: Victoria
- Archdeaconries: Box Hill, Dandenong, Frankston, Geelong, Kew, La Trobe, Maroondah, Melbourne, Port Philip & Bayside & Kingston North, Stonnington & Glen Eira, and The Yarra
- Coordinates: 37°49′1″S 144°58′3″E

Information
- Rite: Anglican
- Cathedral: St Paul's Cathedral, Melbourne

Current leadership
- Archbishop: Ric Thorpe
- Assistant bishops: Genieve Blackwell (Marmingatha Episcopate); Paul Barker (Jumbunna Episcopate); Kate Prowd (Monomeeth Episcopate); Vacant (Oodthenong Episcopate)

Website
- melbourneanglican.org

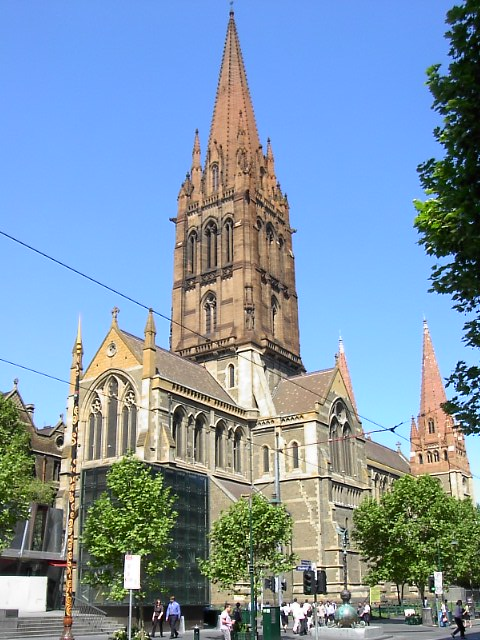
St Paul's Cathedral, Melbourne

The Anglican Diocese of Melbourne is the metropolitan diocese of the Province of Victoria in the Anglican Church of Australia. The diocese was founded from the Diocese of Australia by letters patent of 25 June 1847 and includes the cities of Melbourne and Geelong and also some more rural areas. The cathedral church is St Paul's Cathedral, Melbourne.

The incumbent archbishop of the diocese is Ric Thorpe, who was elected on 24 May 2025 and installed on 30 November 2025. He was translated from the Diocese of London, where he was the suffragan Bishop of Islington.

== History ==
The diocese was founded from the Diocese of Australia by letters patent of 25 June 1847 and includes the cities of Melbourne and Geelong and also some more rural areas. The cathedral church is St Paul's Cathedral, Melbourne. The ordinary of the diocese is the Archbishop of Melbourne.

== Areas of episcopal care ==
The Diocese of Melbourne is divided into areas of episcopal care in which assistant bishops exercise a pastoral role on behalf of the archbishop. These areas are divided into archdeaconries with further subdivision into area deaneries.

Following consultation with the Wurundjeri people of Melbourne, local Indigenous names have been used for the areas of episcopal care. The areas are:

- Marmingatha, covering the inner city, especially along major transport corridors;
- Oodthenong, covering the northern and western growth areas in Greater Melbourne and Geelong;
- Jumbunna, covering parishes south of the Yarra and to the east, including the South-East Growth Corridor; and
- Monomeeth, of which the bishop has responsibilities across the whole of the diocese with a particular focus on people, culture and wellbeing.

Marmingatha means "being with the divine or supreme being", Oodthenong means "gathering", Jumbunna means "speaking out" or "proclamation" and Monomeeth means "rightness, wellness and goodness". Together, they comprise the Woi Wurrung equivalent of the diocesan vision of Making the Word of God Fully Known through "gathering in the divine presence to speak out and proclaim".

== Theological colleges ==
There are two Anglican theological colleges within the diocese, both in the suburb of Parkville. Trinity College Theological School, founded in 1878, is a college of the ecumenical University of Divinity and part of Trinity College, a residential college within the University of Melbourne and is more Liberal and Anglo-Catholic in tradition. Ridley College was founded in 1910 as an independent college in the evangelical tradition and is affiliated with the Australian University of Theology.

== Issues ==
Churchmanship within the Melbourne diocese is diverse and the three nineteenth-century Anglican traditions, Evangelical, Liberal and Anglo-Catholic, are all significantly represented.

The existence of such differing traditions within the diocese is sometimes a cause of theological tensions, evident in the existence of separate theological colleges. The difficulty with which an archbishop was elected in 2006 provided a recent example.

The Diocese of Melbourne has been affected by issues that have been debated in the worldwide Anglican Communion. The theological diversity of the diocese means that there is sometimes disagreement over more contentious matters. In addition, it is frequently perceived that there is a significant tension between the theologically broad Melbourne diocese and the far more conservative Sydney diocese.

=== Ordination of women ===
The diocese was the first in Australia to ordain a woman, when Bishop Moorhouse ordained Marion Macfarlane as a deaconess in 1884. It has ordained women to the diaconate since 1986 and to the priesthood since 1992. The September 2007 decision of the Appellate Tribunal opening the way for the consecration of women to the episcopate was welcomed by then-Archbishop Philip Freier. General Synod approved a motion in October 2007 which welcomed the "clarity" of the decision. Melbourne's first woman to become a bishop, Barbara Darling, was consecrated at St Paul's Cathedral on 31 May 2008. The ordination of women to be bishops is opposed by some within the diocese, particularly conservative Evangelicals and some Anglo-Catholics, necessitating the provision of alternative episcopal oversight.

=== Homosexuality ===
The diocese officially subscribes to the traditional Anglican stance on homosexuality. Most conservatives and Evangelicals remain opposed to the blessing of same-sex unions and the ordination of non-celibate gay and lesbian clergy.

However, the diocese also contains a number of liberal parishes and prominent laypeople, such as Muriel Porter, who have been very vocal in their support for changes in the church's teaching on human sexuality.

=== Abortion ===
In November 2007, an all-female committee from the Diocese of Melbourne made a submission to the Victorian Law Reform Commission outlining its position in relation to abortion. The submission stated that "the Anglican Church is for life" and acknowledged "diversity of ... views" within the diocese. However it also declared that the diocese "supports the provision of safe and affordable abortions with appropriate safeguards for women who, for whatever reasons, request them". The underlying ethical view concerning embryonic life is that "while the embryo/foetus is fully human from the time of conception, it accrues moral significance and value as it develops ... we believe the moral significance increases with the age and development of the foetus. The significance increases gradually over time, in parallel with its physical development. As a pregnancy advances, more powerful moral reasons are required to allow the destruction of the embryo/foetus." The submission was announced in The Melbourne Anglican, in an article entitled "Decriminalise abortion, say Anglican women". This is seen to be the first official approval of abortion by Australian Anglicans.

== List of assistant bishops ==
Bishops coadjutor
| From | Until | Incumbent | Notes |
|---|---|---|---|
| 1934 | 1942 | Joseph Booth | Bishop of Geelong, translated to the diocesan see of Melbourne. |
| 1946 | 1960 | John McKie | Bishop of Geelong and Archdeacon of Melbourne; became Assistant Bishop of Coventry. |
| 1960 | 1963 | Donald Redding | Previously Bishop of Bunbury. |
| 1962 | 1969 | Geoffrey Sambell | Translated to Perth |
| 1963 | 1970 | Felix Arnott | Translated to Brisbane |
| 1969 | 1977 | Bob Dann | Translated to the diocesan see of Melbourne. |
| 1970 | 1985 | James Grant | Dean of Melbourne 1985–1999 |
| 1971 | 1982 | Ged Muston | Translated to North West Australia. |
| 1982 | 1984 | David Penman | Translated to the diocesan see of Melbourne. |
Assistant bishops
| 1978 | 1988 | David Shand | Previously Bishop of St Arnaud; translated between regions. Bishop of the Southern Region (1978–1985) then Bishop in Geelong (1985–1988) |
| 1985 | 1989 | Peter Hollingworth | Bishop in the Inner City, then translated to Brisbane |
| 1985 | 1993 | Robert Butterss | Robert Leopold Butterss, consecrated 24 February 1985 |
| 1985 | 2007 | John Wilson | Bishop of the Southern Region |
| 1989 | 1995 | John Bayton | Bishop of the Western Region |
| 1994 | 2001 | John Stewart | Bishop of the Eastern Region |
| 1994 | 2002 | Andrew Curnow | Bishop of the Northern Region, then translated to Bendigo. |
| 1995 | 2001 | Andrew St. John | Cons. 22 July 1995; Bishop of the Western Region, then Rector at the Church of the Transfiguration, New York |
| 2001 | 2009 | Stephen Hale | Bishop of the Eastern Region |
| 2002 | 2017 | Paul White | Bishop of the Western Region (2002–2007), Southern Region (2007–2015), Jumbunna Episcopate (2015–2016), Growth Areas Ministry (2016–2017) |
| 2003 | 2018 | Philip Huggins | Previously Bishop of Grafton (1998–2003); Bishop of the Northern Region (2003–2007), North West Region (2003–2015), Oodthenong Episcopate (2015–2018) |
| 2008 | 2015 | Barbara Darling | Bishop for Diocesan Ministries (2008–2009), Eastern Region (2009–2015) |
| 2015 | present | Genieve Blackwell | Previously Assistant Bishop, Canberra and Goulburn (2012–2015); translated between regions Bishop of the Marmingatha Episcopate |
| 2015 | 2020 | John Harrower | Previously Bishop of Tasmania (2000–2015); Assistant to the Archbishop of Melbourne in the exercise of his leadership responsibilities as Primate of the Anglican Church of Australia |
| 2015 | 2023 | Lindsay Urwin | Previously Bishop of Horsham (1993–2009); Bishop for Schools |
| 2016 | 2026 | Brad Billings | Bishop for Theological Education and Wellbeing (Bishop of the Monomeeth Episcopate), then Bishop of the Oodthenong Episcopate Translated to Adelaide, 2026. |
| 2016 | present | Paul Barker | Bishop of the Jumbunna Episcopate |
| 2018 | present | Kate Prowd | Bishop of the Oodthenong Episcopate, the Bishop for Theological Education and Wellbeing (Bishop of the Monomeeth Episcopate) |

== Archdeaconries ==
=== Archdeacon of Melbourne ===
- The first archdeacon was Hussey Burgh Macartney: he was also Dean of the Cathedral.

=== Archdeacon of Sale ===
The first archdeacon was Theodore Carlos Benoni Stretch.

=== Archdeacon of Castlemaine ===
The first archdeacon was Archibald Crawford.

=== Archdeacon of Geelong ===
Lloyd Crossley was Vicar of All Saint's, St Kilda from 18 September 1905 until 1911.

== See also ==
- St Peter's Eastern Hill - Parish church of the City of Melbourne
- List of Anglican churches in Melbourne

== Bibliography ==
- Porter, Brian, ed. Melbourne Anglicans: the Diocese of Melbourne, 1847-1997. Melbourne: Mitre Books, 1997.
