= Katherine Firth =

Australian poet and librettist

- Born: 24 February 1979 (age 47); Western Australia
- Occupations: Poet, university lecturer
- Spouse: Andreas Loewe
- Writing career
- Genres: Poetry, cantata, anthem
- Website: katherinefirth.net

Katherine Elizabeth Firth (born 24 February 1979) is an Australian poet and librettist. She is the inaugural head of Lisa Bellear House at the University of Melbourne. She previously was academic coordinator at International House, University of Melbourne, a university lecturer at La Trobe University, Melbourne, and a research associate at Trinity College Theological School, Melbourne, the theological college of the Anglican Province of Victoria.

== Education ==
Firth was born in Western Australia and raised in Melbourne, the Northern Territory and Hong Kong, where she completed her schooling at King George V School. She read English literature at Newnham College, Cambridge, and completed a master's degree in music, history and culture at Oxford Brookes University, where she also gained her doctorate for her thesis "The MacNeices and their Circles: Poets & Composers in Collaboration 1939-54".

== Career ==
=== Poet and librettist ===
Firth has created libretti for collaborations with award-winning Sydney composer Andrew Schultz and Melbourne composers Michael Leighton Jones, and Peter Campbell. Her collaboration with Andrew Schultz, Southern Cantata, op. 102, was first performed on Advent Sunday 2017 at St John's Church Southbank, Victoria. The work was first broadcast on 3MBS radio in February 2018.

Her collaboration with Michael Leighton Jones, Anthem for the Feast of any Healer, was first performed by the Choir of Trinity College, Cambridge, directed by Stephen Layton. It was subsequently recorded by the Australian Broadcasting Corporation performed by the librettist and the Choir of Trinity College (University of Melbourne) under the direction of the composer.

Two collaborations with Peter Campbell, Sunlight touches the roses and In Advent heat, were written for and recorded by the Choir of Trinity College (University of Melbourne).

Firth has reflected on the poetry of the former Archbishop of Canterbury, Rowan Williams, for the Australian Broadcasting Corporation's Encounter program.

=== Academic and educator ===
Firth has collaborated with her husband, Andreas Loewe, on a detailed study of Martin Luther's use of the arts to promote his reformation, Martin Luther and the Arts: Music, Images, and Drama to Promote the Reformation. She has published on Lutheran compositions with Loewe, creating English study translations of the German libretti of Bach's St John Passion, and Martin Luther's iconic hymn "Ein feste Burg ist unser Gott" ("A Mighty Fortress Is Our God"). Both contributed a joint reflection on the word setting and music of Bach to Ida Lichter's The Secret Magic of Music: Conversations with Musical Masters.

Firth has published widely in the field of poetry and music, including articles on modernist poets T. S. Eliot, Louis MacNeice and Ezra Pound, Australian and British women poets Judith Wright and Kathleen Raine, and composers such as Gerald Finzi.

In 2013, she received the University of Melbourne's Norman Curry Award for her work in developing Thesis Boot Camp with educators Peta Freestone and Liam Connell. Her academic skills work centres on fostering academic writing skills. Her How to fix academic writing trouble, with Inger Mewburn and Shaun Lehmann, is being published by Open University Press.
