= Inger Mewburn =

Australian academic (born 1970)

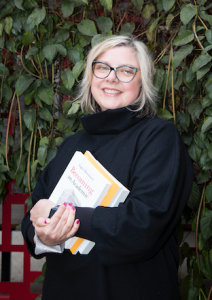
- Born: 1970 (age 55–56); Hobart, Australia
- Education: University of Melbourne (PhD); RMIT University (Bachelor of Architecture (Hons.); Master of Architecture)
- Known for: Research on doctoral education, research student experiences, post-PhD employment pathways, and digital scholarship.
- Notable work: The Thesis Whisperer blog; How to be an academic; How to fix your academic writing trouble
- Website: thesiswhisperer.com

Inger Blackford Mewburn (born 1970) is a Professor and Director of Research Training at the Australian National University, Canberra, Australia. She has published on academic identity, writing, and digital scholarship. She is known as "The Thesis Whisperer" on social media, and has been named as an "Australian social media influencer in higher education." Mewburn uses social media to provide commentary on researching student experiences (particularly with thesis writing), researching student supervision, and post-doctoral employment pathways.

== Education ==
Born in Hobart, Tasmania, and raised in Melbourne, Victoria, Mewburn completed her schooling at Croydon High School in 1988.

Mewburn's undergraduate degree was from RMIT University and she was awarded her doctorate from the University of Melbourne in 2009 for her thesis, "Constructing Bodies: gesture speech and representation at work in Architecture classrooms." Her dissertation was awarded the John Grice Award for Best Thesis in the Faculty of Architecture, Building and Planning.

== Career ==
Mewburn was a Research Fellow at RMIT University from 2006–2012, and worked with research higher degree students and their supervisors as a research education and development scholar. Since 2013, Mewburn has been Director of Research Training at the Australian National University.

She undertakes research on post-graduate research within higher education, and is an influential voice on social media on this topic. In 2010, Mewburn started The Thesis Whisperer blog. Her work on this blog, grounded in her academic research, has earned her global recognition as an expert on topics in doctoral education and academic cultures. She is frequently invited to work with cohorts of research students around the world. Mewburn is committed to sharing her knowledge to help others during their thesis process.

Mewburn regularly writes for and provides expert opinion on doctoral issues to peak publications and higher education forums such as Nature, The Conversation, The Guardian, Times Higher Education, Campus Review, and the London School of Economics Impact Blog. She has mentored and supported the establishment of other scholarly development blogs, which are influenced by her successful model; these include the DoctoralWritingSIG blog, Mademoiselle Scientist and The Research Whisperer.

In 2015, Mewburn ran a massive open online course, How to Survive Your PhD. The bulk of the content was organized around the emotions experienced by most PhD students: Confidence; Frustration; Loneliness; Fear; Curiosity; Confusion; Boredom and Love. The course was designed to cater for students' families and supervisors, as well as the students themselves. Mewburn said that it was "... really heartening to see mums, dads, partners and even children of Ph.D. students are so interested in learning about the emotional parts of the journey."

== Research ==
=== Academic identity and workload ===
Mewburn's research has focused on the process of becoming an academic. In 2010, Robyn Barnacle and Mewburn published an influential paper showing that scholarly identity is distributed and is performed through both traditional and non‐traditional sites of learning. In 2011, she built on this work, and on material published on her Thesis Whisperer blog, to argue that PhD student 'troubles talk' in everyday interactions form an important aspect of identity formation.

In 2013, Mewburn and Pat Thomson published an influential paper on why academics blog. They positioned this activity as a community of practice primarily written for other academics. In 2017, Deborah Lupton, Mewburn and Pat Thomson edited a book on the digital academic, which bought together accounts of using digital media and technologies as part of academic practice across teaching, research administration and scholarship.

In 2019, Adrian Barnett, Mewburn, and Sven Schroter published a paper analyzing the submission of manuscripts and peer reviews, to understand the amount of work undertaken outside of standard working hours.

=== Academic employment ===
Over time, Mewburn's research has come to focus on the challenge of employability of PhD students in Australia. In 2016, Rachael E Pitt and Mewburn published an analysis of advertisements for academic positions that sought to understand what graduate attributes universities were seeking from PhD candidates. In 2019, Mewburn published Becoming an academic: How to get through grad school and beyond. One reviewer commented that Mewburn's approach allowed her to engage with "...topics that are only discussed in conversations hidden in the office kitchenette."

In 2018, Mewburn, Will J. Grant, Hanna Suominen and Stephanie Kizimchuk used machine learning and natural language processing to analyze the content of non-academic Australian job advertisements to understand what proportion of positions would be suitable for PhD graduates. In 2020, Mewburn, Chenchen Xu, Hanna Suominen and Will J. Grant launched the PostAc tool, a real-world instantiation of her research that aims to help research degree graduates find employment. It aims to make the market for advanced research skills more visible to job seekers.

=== Selected publications ===
==== Articles ====
- Barnacle, Robyn; Mewburn, Inger (June 2010). "Learning networks and the journey of 'becoming doctor'". Studies in Higher Education. 35 (4): 433–444. doi:10.1080/03075070903131214. ISSN 0307-5079.
- Mewburn, Inger; Thomson, Pat (October 2013). "Why do academics blog? An analysis of audiences, purposes and challenges". Studies in Higher Education. 38 (8): 1105–1119. doi:10.1080/03075079.2013.835624. ISSN 0307-5079.

===== Books =====
- Lupton, Deborah; Mewburn, Inger; Thomson, Pat, eds. (2017). The Digital Academic: Critical Perspectives on Digital Technologies in Higher Education. Abingdon: Routledge. ISBN 978-1-138-20257-3.
- Mewburn, Inger (2017). How to Be An Academic: The Thesis Whisperer Reveals All. A NewSouth book. Sydney, N.S.W: NewSouth Publishing. ISBN 978-1-74223-507-3.
- McMaster, Christopher; Murphy, Caterina; Whitburn, Benjamin; Mewburn, Inger, eds. (2017). Postgraduate Study in Australia: Surviving and Succeeding. New York: Peter Lang. ISBN 978-1-4331-4161-4.
- Mewburn, Inger (2019). Becoming an Academic: How to Get through Grad School and Beyond. Baltimore: Johns Hopkins University Press. ISBN 978-1-4214-2880-2.
- Mewburn, Inger; Firth, Katherine; Lehmann, Shaun (2019). How to Fix Your Academic Writing Trouble: A Practical Guide. London: Open University Press. ISBN 978-0-335-24332-7.
- Mewburn, Inger; Firth, Katherine; Lehmann, Shaun (2021). Level up Your Essays: How to Get Better Grades at University. Sydney: NewSouth Publishing. ISBN 978-1-74223-680-3.
- Firth, Katherine (2023). Writing Well and Being Well for Your PhD and Beyond: How to Cultivate a Strong and Sustainable Writing Practice for Life. Milton: Taylor & Francis Group. ISBN 978-1-000-93612-4.
- Mewburn, Inger; Clews, Simon (2023). Be Visible or Vanish: Engage, Influence and Ensure Your Research Has Impact. Milton: Taylor & Francis Group. ISBN 978-1-000-84193-0.

== Awards and recognition ==
- 2020: Special commendation for leadership, Australian Council of Graduate Research.
- 2019: Admitted as Vitae Senior Research Developer Fellow.
- 2017: Grant from the Discovery Translation Funds, Canberra Innovation Network, to develop the 'PostAc' application (AUD$150K).
- 2017: Vice Chancellor's award for innovation and excellence in service, Australian National University.
- 2015: Grant from the Australian Commonwealth Department of Industry, Innovation and Science for "Tracking Trends in Industry Demand for Australia's Advanced Research Workforce: Pilot Study" (AUD$90K; with Will J. Grant).
- 2014: Grant from the Australian Commonwealth Department of Education, Skills and Employment for "INSIGNIA: An open badge system for research training and supervision at ANU" (AUD$40K).
- 2010: John Grice Award for Best Thesis in the Faculty of Architecture, Building and Planning, University of Melbourne.
