= Mark Burton (bishop) =

Anglican dean

A former nurse and Iraq War veteran, Mark Gregory Burton was an Anglican curate in Werribee, chaplain to Archbishop Keith Rayner and the incumbent at Glen Iris. He was an assistant bishop in the Diocese of Perth from 2006 to 2009 and Dean of St Paul's Cathedral, Melbourne from 2009 to 2012.

Anglican Communion titles
Preceded by David Richardson	Dean of Melbourne; 2009–2012	Succeeded by Andreas Loewe
