= Stephen Hart (bishop) =

John Stephen Hart (27 December 1866 - 28 May 1952) was an Australian Anglican bishop who was the Bishop of Wangaratta.

== Early life ==
Hart was born in Caulfield, Victoria, in 1866, the son of John Hart and his wife Mary, who was the daughter of Sir George Stephen. He was educated at East St Kilda Grammar School.

== Education and ministry ==
Hart graduated from the University of Melbourne in 1887 and was ordained deacon in 1893 and priest in 1894. He served curacies at St Paul's, Geelong (1893-1896) and Christ Church, South Yarra (1896-1900). He was then the vicar of Holy Trinity Benalla (1900-1903), St Anselm's Middle Park (1904-1907) and St Martin's Hawksburn (1907-1914).

In 1912, Hart was appointed to the theological staff at Trinity College, Melbourne. In 1914 he became the Warden of St John's Theological College in St Kilda East. In September 1919 he was elected the Dean of Melbourne following the death of Charles Godby. He was appointed Bishop of Wangaratta in 1927 and retired in 1942.

== Personal life ==
In 1900, at Christ Church, South Yarra, he married Catherine Buckhurst (1868-1942). Hart died in 1952, aged 85, and was buried at St Kilda Cemetery.

== Sources ==
- The Times, 2 May 1927
- Australian Dictionary of Biography

Religious titles
Preceded by Charles Godby	Dean of Melbourne; 1919-1927	Succeeded by George Aickin
