= John Stewart (bishop) =

John Craig Stewart (born 10 August 1940) was the Bishop of the Eastern Region and Vicar General of the Anglican Diocese of Melbourne.

Stewart was educated at Newington College (1953–1954), Wesley College, Melbourne and Ridley Theological College.

He is married to Janine Stewart.
