= James Grant (Australian bishop) =

Australian Anglican bishop (1931–2019)

James Alexander Grant AM (31 August 1931 – 10 July 2019) was an Australian Anglican bishop and Dean of St Paul's Cathedral, Melbourne.

Grant obtained a BA (Hons) in history at the University of Melbourne. After further studies at the Trinity College Theological School, Melbourne, during 1957 and 1958, where he was awarded the Hey Sharp Prize in the Licentiate of Theology examination, he was ordained in 1959. He obtained a Bachelor of Divinity from the Melbourne College of Divinity in 1968.

After curacies in Murrumbeena and Broadmeadows he was chaplain to Archbishop Frank Woods from 1966 until his consecration as a coadjutor bishop in Melbourne on 21 December 1970 at Paul's Cathedral. Grant was chaplain of Trinity College from 1970–75 and dean of St Paul's Cathedral 1985–99. He was chairman of Lowther Hall CEGGS, Tintern CEGGS, Melbourne CEGGS, the Brotherhood of St Laurence and the Mission to Streets and Lanes.

Grant collaborated with Geoffrey Serle in the publication of The Melbourne Scene (1957), and authored a centenary history of Trinity College, Perspective of a Century (1972), and a history of Anglicans in Victoria, Episcopally Led and Synodically Governed: Anglicans in Victoria 1803–1997 (2010). He was made a Member of the Order of Australia in 1994, received a Jubilee Medal in 1977 and a Centenary Medal in 2001. In retirement he volunteered as Trinity College's bequest officer.

== Personal ==
Grant died on 10 July 2019. His widow is Rowena Armstrong AO QC, a former Victorian Chief Parliamentary Counsel.

Religious titles
Preceded by Tom William Thomas	Dean of Melbourne; 1985–1999	Succeeded by David John Leyburn Richardson
