= Paul White (bishop) =

Paul Raymond White (born 1949) is a retired bishop who served as an assistant bishop in the Anglican Diocese of Melbourne from 2002 to 2017: of the western region until 2007, of the southern region from 2007 until 2015, of Jumbunna Episcopate from 2015 until 2016, and as bishop for Growth Areas ministry from 2016 until his retirement in 2017.

After an earlier career as a teacher, White graduated from the University of Canberra in 1985 and was ordained in 1986. He was, successively, curate at St Nicholas' Goulburn, priest in charge of St Philip's Reigate, the incumbent at Christ Church, Queanbeyan, vicar of St Matthew's Redhill and vicar of St George's East Ivanhoe.
