= Anglican Diocese of St Arnaud =

Anglican diocese in Australia

Diocese of St Arnaud
- Coat of arms

Location
- Country: Australia
- Territory: Mallee; Wimmera
- Ecclesiastical province: Victoria
- Metropolitan: Archbishop of Melbourne
- Coordinates: 36°36′59″S 143°15′18″E

Information
- Denomination: Anglicanism
- Established: 1926
- Dissolved: 1976
- Cathedral: Christ Church, St Arnaud
- Parent church: Church of England in Australia

The Anglican Diocese of St Arnaud was a diocese of the Church of England in Australia (now the Anglican Church of Australia), in the Mallee and Wimmera regions of north-west Victoria. It was created in 1926 out of the Diocese of Ballarat and named after the town of St Arnaud. In 1976 it was amalgamated into the Diocese of Bendigo.

== Bishops ==
- Melville Charles James (1926–1950)
- Allen Ernest Winter (1951–1973)
- David Hubert Warner Shand (1973–1976), who was also the dean.

== Archdeacons of St Arnaud ==
Incomplete list

- Frederic Morgan-Payler (1930–1935)
- H. D. Campbell (1935–1938) (also Vicar of Christ Church)
- Edmund Franklin Cooper (1939–1940) (also Vicar of Christ Church)
- R Gearing (1941–1945) (also Vicar of Christ Church)
- Ernest Joseph Lees (1945–1954)
- John Burnett (1965–1968)
- John Burnett (1970–1972)
- John Aylmer Leaver (1973–1974) (also Vicar of Christ Church, 1966–1974)

== Cathedral ==
The cathedral church was Christ Church, St Arnaud, now known as Christ Church Old Cathedral. The church was designed by F. M. Moore and built in 1864 in a Victorian unpainted brick Early English Gothic style.
