= Frederick Head =

Australian archbishop (1874–1941)

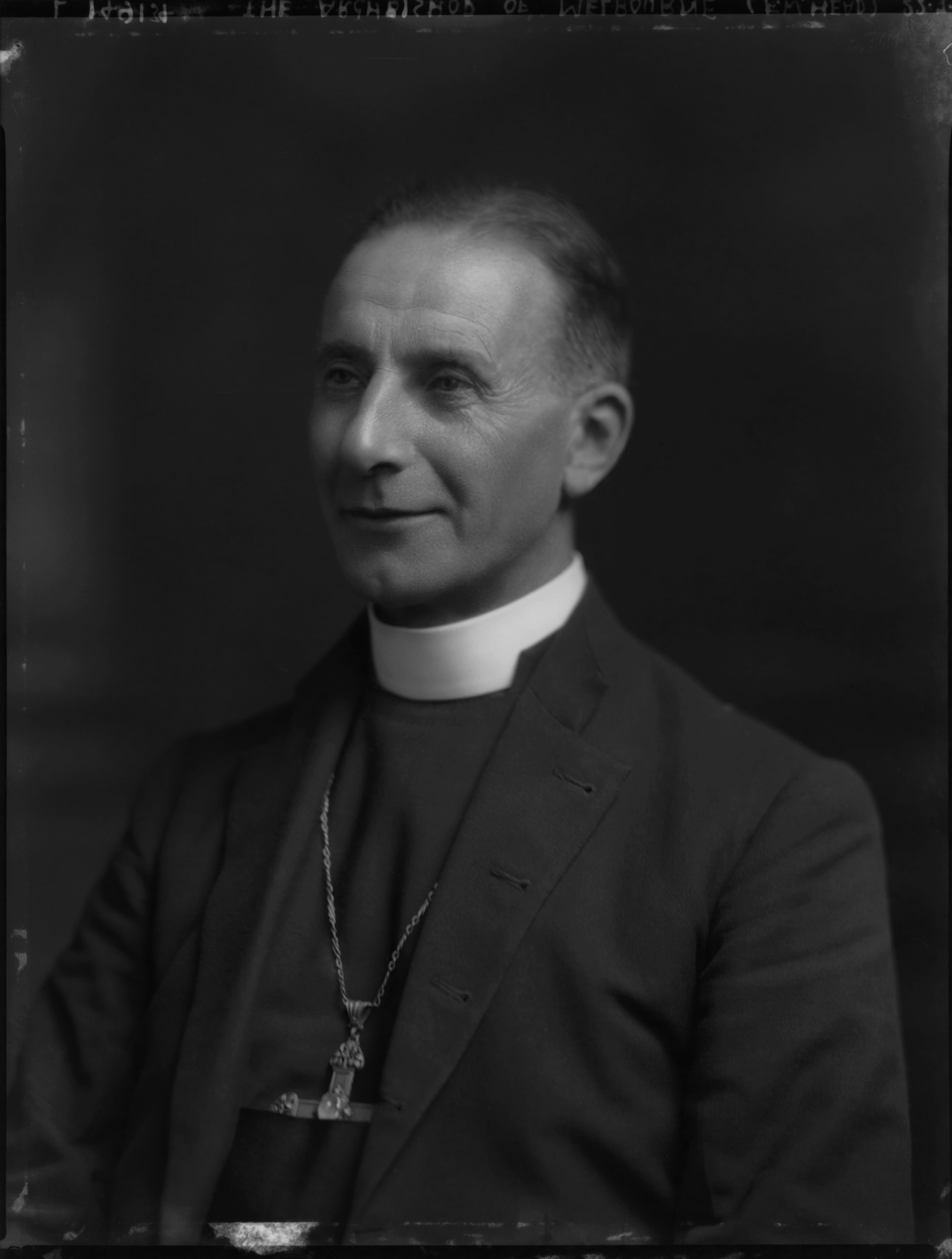
Head in 1930

Frederick Waldegrave Head MC & Bar (18 April 1874 – 18 December 1941) was Anglican archbishop of Melbourne, Australia.

Head was born in Tollington Park, London. In 1915, he was interviewed for a commission as a Temporary Chaplain to the Forces. His lack of parochial experience counted against him, and he was thought to be 'slow in movement'. After a second interview in January 1916 he was appointed and posted to France. He could speak French and had already spent a year there working in a YMCA hut. He was attached to the Guards Division and was popular with the Guards:

Head... who might have been expected to be handicapped from the start as a Cambridge don, was an outstanding success. He was as successful with the officers in a lecture on Napoleon as he was with the men singing Tommy Tickler's Jar.

By the time of his demobilisation in 1919, Head was Senior Chaplain to the Guards Division and the holder of a Military Cross and Bar. There is a citation for the Bar:

For most conspicuous gallantry and devotion to duty during operations lasting for several days, when he was continually in the front line accompanying an attack, and by his splendid example inspired the men on all occasions, whilst his attention to wounded and dying men were performed under continuous and heavy fire of all descriptions. His behaviour was the admiration of the whole division.

In October, 1918, the Deputy Chaplain-General described him as 'First Rate ... in every way'. Head was considered for bishoprics in England during the 1920s, particularly Peterborough in 1923, but he had not impressed Randall Davidson, Archbishop of Canterbury, who wrote to the Prime Minister that Head 'was not in what I should regard as the first rank of men of power and leadership'.
