= List of Anglican churches in Melbourne =

This is a list of Anglican churches in Melbourne, Victoria, Australia. It covers all greater Melbourne metropolitan and suburban areas which have a postcode, excluding the rural areas, added to the city in 2009.

| Congregation | Image | Suburb/ Coordinates | Parish (Ecclesiastical) | Notes |
|---|---|---|---|---|
| All Saints' | | Mitcham; 37°48′57″S 145°11′29″E | Mitcham and Nunawading | Completed in 1958 on the site of a former 1888 church, listed on the Victorian Heritage Register |
| Brimbank | | Keilor East | Brimbank | |
| Christ Church Dingley ccd.org.au | | Dingley | | |
| City on a Hill: Melbourne | | Melbourne CBD | | |
| City on a Hill: Melbourne East | | Malvern East | | |
| City on a Hill: Melbourne West | | West Footscray | | |
| City on a Hill: Geelong | | East Geelong | | |
| City on a Hill: Surf Coast | | Mount Duneed | | |
| City on a Hill: whittington | | Whittington | | |
| Holy Spirit Watsonia | | Watsonia | Banyule | |
| Holy Trinity | | Balaclava | Balaclava and Elwood | Established in 1871; the sandstone building with unique pepperpot baptistery was opened 15 years later |
| Holy Trinity | | Doncaster; 37°47′16″S 145°8′17″E | | |
| Holy Trinity | | Ringwood East; 37°48′42″S 145°14′56″E | | |
| Holy Trinity | | Williamstown; 37°51′37″S 144°54′6″E | | Erected in 1871 |
| Holy Trinity | | Kew | | Erected in 1862 |
| Saint Alfred's | | Blackburn North | | |
| St Andrew's Brighton | | Brighton; 37°54′41″S 144°59′34″E | | |
| Saint Andrew's | | Blackburn North | | |
| St Andrew's Rosanna | | Rosanna; 37°44′31″S 145°3′44″E | Banyule | Closed Dec 2022 |
| Saint Augustine's | | Coburg; 37°45′9″S 144°57′53″E | | Erected in 1918 |
| Saint Bartholomew's | | Burnley; 37°49′24″S 145°0′26″E | | Erected in 1884 |
| Saint George's | | Ivanhoe East | | |
| Saint George's | | Malvern; 37°51′19″S 145°1′48″E | | Erected in 1865 |
| Saint Hilary's | | Kew; 37°48′41″S 145°3′9″E | | Erected in 1888 with the current church building completed in 1939 and later consecrated in 1943 |
| Saint James' (Old Cathedral) | | Melbourne; 37°42′26″S 144°56′18″E | | Completed in 1847 |
| Saint James the Great | | St Kilda East; 37°52′02″S 145°00′12″E | St Kilda East | Erected 1915 |
| Saint James' | | Glen Iris; 37°51′32″S 145°3′3″E | | |
| Saint John's | | Frankston North; 38°7′8″S 145°8′57″E | | |
| St John's Heidelberg | | Heidelberg; 37°45′24″S 145°4′20″E | Banyule | Parish commenced 1848; church completed in 1851; listed on the Victorian Heritage Register |
| Saint John's | | Diamond Creek; 37°40′25″S 145°8′59″E | | |
| Saint John's | | Camberwell | | |
| Saint Jude's | | Carlton; 37°47′47″S 144°58′3″E | | Erected in 1874 |
| Saint Mark's Anglican Church | | Templestowe; 37°45′56″S 145°7′13″E | Templestowe | Established as Christ Church in 1900 after operating from a school building from 1854. Moved to current site and name changed in 1975. |
| Saint Matthew's | | Glenroy; 37°42′14″S 144°55′26″E | | |
| Saint Matthew's | | Wheelers Hill; 37°54′37″S 145°10′43″E | | |
| Saint Mark's | | Camberwell | | Erected in 1913 with the current church building completed in 1929 |
| St Michael and St Luke Dandenong | | Dandenong North | Dandenong North | |
| Saint Michael's Anglican Church | | Carlton North; 37°47′6″S 144°58′6″E | | Erected in 1885 |
| Saint Oswald's | | Glen Iris; 37°51′46″S 145°4′14″E | | |
| Saint Paul's Cathedral | | Melbourne | | Erected in 1852 with current cathedral consecrated in 1891 |
| Saint Paul's | | Ringwood; 37°48′35″S 145°13′52″E | Mullum Mullum | |
| Saint Peter's | | Bundoora; 37°41′59″S 145°3′36″E | | |
| Saint Peter's | | Box Hill; 37°49′9″S 145°7′39″E | | Anglican worship in Box Hill began in 1861 with a small church at Canterbury Road and Bedford Street. A new brick church was built in 1883 on land donated at Whitehorse Road and Frankcom Street, replaced in 1908 by a larger wooden church. Fires in 1943 and 1949 destroyed that building, leading to the Peace Memorial Church designed by Louis Williams, completed in stages in 1951 and 1971. An addition by in 2006 provided offices and meeting spaces. |
| Saint Philip's | | Box Hill North; 37°48′3″S 145°7′35″E | | |
| Saint Stephen's | | Warrandyte; 37°44′32″S 145°12′34″E | | |
| Saint Thomas' | | Werribee; 37°54′25″S 144°39′17″E | | Erected in 1900. Extended in the 1940/50s |
| Saint Timothy's | | Bulleen; 37°46′20″S 145°5′47″E | | |

== See also ==
- List of Anglican churches
- Anglican Diocese of Melbourne
