= Rein Slagmolen =

Dutch Australian artist and sculptor

Marinus "Rein" Slagmolen (7 November 1916 – 29 January 1999) was a Dutch-Australian artist and sculptor.

== Early life and education ==
Rein Slagmolen was born on 7 November 1916 in the province of Utrecht, Netherlands, as the youngest son of Gijsbertus Slagmolen and Mathilda Maria Slagmolen-Jacobs. Rein had three older siblings, Cornelia Maria "Corrie" (1906-2004), Gijsbertus "Gijs" (1908-1993), and Marinus Allegondus (1909-1911).

As a young man, Slagmolen saw himself "as 'Tarzan' and looking for adventure". He spent some years in Africa before the Second World War. He enlisted in the Princess Irene Brigade in England in 1943, where he was a member of Gevechts Groep 3 (GGIII). He returned to Africa after the war.

Slagmolen studied art in Europe and Africa.

== Career ==
H. W. Jones Pty Ltd, through the initiative of Rex Jones, expanded their lead-lighting work about the time the new St Andrew's Church, Brighton was being built in 1961. H.W. Jones was an established firm in Sydney Road, Brunswick, Melbourne, and operated as experienced lead lighters, merchants, and importers.

With the intention of providing a full design service, Rex Jones and Rein Slagmolen formed a partnership to establish Vetrart Studios for the purpose of designing and making windows and other artworks. Vetrart Studios recognised the need for architects, artists, and industry to work collaboratively in the design and construction of new church buildings.

Slagmolen also had a background in chemical research, leading to the making of such materials as 'Polylite' panels and a matrix for concrete glass windows. The latter, he claimed, was dimensionally stable and overcame the problem of these windows leaking because of the shrinking of the concrete matrix. He worked with the CSIRO to develop innovative techniques to hold and strengthen glass panels.

In the early 1960s, Slagmolen and Vetrart Studios worked with the noted Australian church architect Louis Williams for such major commissions as St Andrew's Church, Brighton and St Boniface's Cathedral, Bunbury. Another well-known example of Slagmolen's work is the glass mosaic wall in the foyer of Qantas House in Melbourne. By the late 1960s he was collaborating with the architects Godfrey & Spowers, Hughes, and Mewton & Lobb.

During the 1960s Slagmolen developed an artists’ colony at the former convent, Casa Maria, in Melbourne.

Slagmolen worked in bronze, aluminum, concrete, plastics, enamels as well as stained glass. Slagmolen was also among the artists exploring the possibilities of dalle de verre glasswork.

Major examples of Slagmolen's work exist in:

- St Andrew's Anglican Church, Brighton, Melbourne, Victoria
- St Boniface's Anglican Cathedral, Bunbury, Western Australia
- St Francis Xavier Catholic Church, Montmorency, Victoria
- Holy Eucharist Catholic Church, Chadstone, Melbourne, Victoria
- Qantas House, Melbourne, Victoria
- Artagen Building, Pitt Street, Circular Quay, Sydney
- Dallas Brooks Hall in East, Melbourne, Victoria
- R.F.G. Fogarty Brewhouse at Northern Australian Breweries, Cairns, Queensland

== Personal life and death ==
Rein emigrated to Australia with his then-wife Hilary Prudence "Prue" Reynolds Slagmolen in 1949 to establish himself as an artist and sculptor.

Rein died on 29 January 1999.
