= Douglas Alexandra =

Australian architect

- Born: Diomedes Alexandratos; 6 February 1922; Shepparton, Victoria
- Died: 19 February 2000 (aged 78); Cabrini Hospital, Melbourne, Victoria
- Education: University of Melbourne
- Occupation: Architect
- Practice: Berg and Alexandra
- Buildings: Masionettes, Meyer Road, Burwood; Burwood Pre-School Centre, Alfred Road, Glen Iris; Hamilton Art Gallery and Municipal Library

Douglas Alexandra (6 February 1922 – 19 February 2000) was an Australian architect, whose works were an important contribution to modernist architecture in Melbourne, Australia.

== Biography ==
Douglas Alexandra, was born Diomedes Alexandratos, in Shepparton, Victoria on 6 February 1922. He was the fourth and youngest child of Andreas Alexandratos (1872–1950) and Sophia (née Paizes) (1892–1974). His father migrated from Ithaca, Greece to Australia in 1910, where he established a fruit and vegetable shop in Melbourne. Andreas then went into partnership with his two brothers operating a café, the London Café, in Elizabeth Street, Melbourne before moving to Shepparton in 1914 and establishing a café there.

Alexandra graduated from Caulfield Grammar in 1940 and worked in drafting and land surveying offices until December 1942 when he joined the RAAF. His Lancaster bomber was shot down during a strategic bombing mission on 20 January 1944 over Neubrandenburg and he was incarcerated for one year in the German war camp, Stalag Luft III. Discharged from the RAAF in 1946, he anglicised his name and began a Bachelor of Architecture at the University of Melbourne.

After graduating Alexandra opened his own firm and soon established himself as one of 'Melbourne's first post-war modernist architects'. Alexandra designed a series of residences and two kindergartens, one in Beaumaris (1956) and one in Burwood (1957), as well as a regional art gallery and library complex in Hamilton, Victoria and the Town Hall in Shepparton, Victoria. During the 1950s Alexandra lectured in design at the University of Melbourne, alongside Raymond Berg, before the two went into practice together in 1962. Their firm, Berg and Alexandra, was responsible for designing several notable projects in regional Victoria and Melbourne, including the Nunawading Civic Centre and the Mildura Arts Centre. Berg retired in 1983 and Alexandra retired in 1996, selling the practice to Hudson and Wardrop. Alexandra died on 19 February 2000 at Cabrini Hospital, Melbourne, Victoria of Non-Hodgkin lymphoma. He is buried in Melbourne General Cemetery, Carlton, Victoria.

== Notable works ==
=== Burwood Masionettes ===
The March 1952 edition of Australian Home Beautiful' describes the design of the pair of maisonettes as one that "breaks away from the old familiar features of this kind of dwelling by the imaginative use of natural colour and texture of materials and by the pleasantly simple design". The Heritage Alliance notes that it is a "notable post-war re-interpretation of a pre-war housing type" and a "significant early work by this important modernist architect".

=== Burwood Pre-School Centre ===
The Pre-school centre is a classic example of the 'Melbourne Regional style' of the 1950s, with its boldness in structure, geometry and colour. The Burwood Pre-School is a single-storey building, comprising a large central playroom with a distinctive zig-zag roof. Framed up with diagonal steel members in a scissor-like configuration, the zigzag roof essentially comprises three contiguous butterfly roofs, forming three small gables with an upward-sloping skillion at each end. On the north facade, the gable ends are expressed as three diamond-shaped panels and two half-diamonds, each enlivened by concentric rows of flat timber mouldings to create an eye-popping optical effect. Alexandra also proposed an elaborate playground design, with oddly-shaped sandpits and garden beds and interlocking diagonal pathways.

=== Hamilton Art Gallery and Municipal Library ===
In 1958 the Hamilton Council commissioned Alexandra to design an art gallery to accommodate a bequeathed collection of fine art. The building was completed and opened in 1961. In 1973 a second floor was added to the gallery. The Australian Heritage Database describes the building as having "regional significance as an illustration of the leading role played by Hamilton in recent years in the cultural life of the region."

== List of works ==
- 1951 – 6A & 6B Meyer Road, Burwood (Maisonettes)
- 1951 – 10 Heather Grove, Cheltenham (Residence)
- 1953 – Alexandra Road, Ringwood East (Residence)
- 1954 – 2 Maurice Street, Hawthorn East (Residence)
- 1954 – 13 Point Avenue, Beaumaris (Residence)
- 1954 – 28 Wellington Avenue, Beaumaris (Residence)
- 1955 – 7 Hume Street, Kew (Residence)
- 1956 – 27 Orion Street, Balwyn North (Residence – extended 1961)
- 1956 – 26 Grandview Avenue, Beaumaris (Jack & Jill Kindergarten)
- 1957 – 48a Alfred Road, Glen Iris (Burwood Pre-School Centre)
- 1958–59 – 107 Brown Street, Hamilton (Hamilton Art Gallery and Municipal Library)
- 1959 – 26 Tashinny Road, Toorak (Residence)
- 1959 – 4 Lydia Court, Balwyn (Residence)
- 1959 – 539 The Blvd, Ivanhoe East (Residence)
- 1961 – 61 Molesworth Street, Kew (Residence)
- 1961 – 168 Tramway Pde, Beaumaris (Residence)

== See also ==
- List of Australian architects
