= Preparationism =

Preparationism is the view in Christian theology that unregenerate people can take steps in preparation for conversion, and should be exhorted to do so. Preparationism advocates a series of things that people need to do before they come to believe in Jesus Christ, such as reading the Bible, attending worship, listening to sermons, and praying for the gift of the Holy Spirit. By making use of these means of grace, a "person seeking conversion might dispose himself toward receiving God's grace."

== Adherents and critics ==
Many Puritans held to this view, especially in New England. These include Thomas Hooker (the founder of Connecticut Colony), Thomas Shepard, and Solomon Stoddard. Later preparationists include William Shedd. Preparationism originated within Calvinism, although its views were criticised for being Arminian.

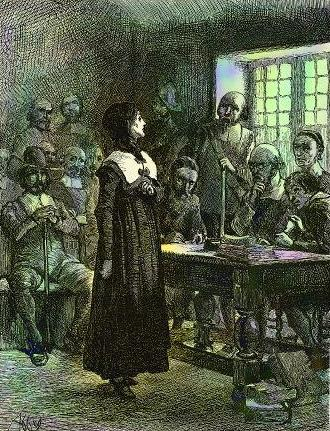
Anne Hutchinson on Trial by Edwin Austin Abbey.

Martyn McGeown identifies William Perkins, William Ames, and Richard Sibbes as preparationists. Sibbes, however, warned against excessive preparationism on the basis that some spirits "may die under the wound and burthen, before they be raised up again." In New England, Giles Firmin suggested that preparationists had "misdirected attention from the solace of Christ and had become obsessed with the inadequacy of self."

John Cotton and Anne Hutchinson regarded preparationism as a covenant of works, a criticism that was one of the causes of the Antinomian Controversy, which led to Hutchinson being banished from the Massachusetts Bay Colony in 1638. Historians have debated the factors in Hutchinson's downfall, including issues of politics and gender; but intellectual historians have focused on theological factors, including preparationism, antinomianism, mortalism, and the idea of sanctification being evidence of justification. Harvard University historian Perry Miller views the incident as a "dispute over the place of unregenerate human activity, or 'natural ability', preparatory to saving conversion." Similarly, Rhys Bezzant sees the Antinomian crisis as pitting Hutchinson and others against "the defenders of preparationist piety." Bezzant goes on to argue that Jonathan Edwards distanced himself from his grandfather Solomon Stoddard's "preparationist model of conversion."

Robert Horn notes that Joseph Hart's hymn "Come, ye sinners, poor and wretched" represents a complete disagreement with preparationism:

Come, ye weary, heavy laden,
Bruised and broken by the fall;
If you tarry till you’re better,
You will never come at all;
Not the righteous, not the righteous,
Sinners Jesus came to call.

== Evaluation ==
Michael McClymond suggests that preparationism "balanced out the stress on God's sovereignty by insisting that there was something that human beings could and should do while they were waiting on God to grant his converting grace." Emory Elliott argues that it "eventually became a central tenet in the evolving system of spiritual nourishment and social control in the pioneer communities of Puritan New England." Martyn McGeown suggests that "it is surprising that the notion of preparatory grace became so popular among the Puritans, since many of them helped frame the Westminster Confession, which teaches that 'natural man, being altogether averse from that good, and dead in sin, is not able, by his own strength, to convert himself, or to prepare himself thereunto' (9:3)."
