= St Hilary's Anglican Church, Melbourne =

Church in Melbourne, Australia

St Hilary's Anglican Church
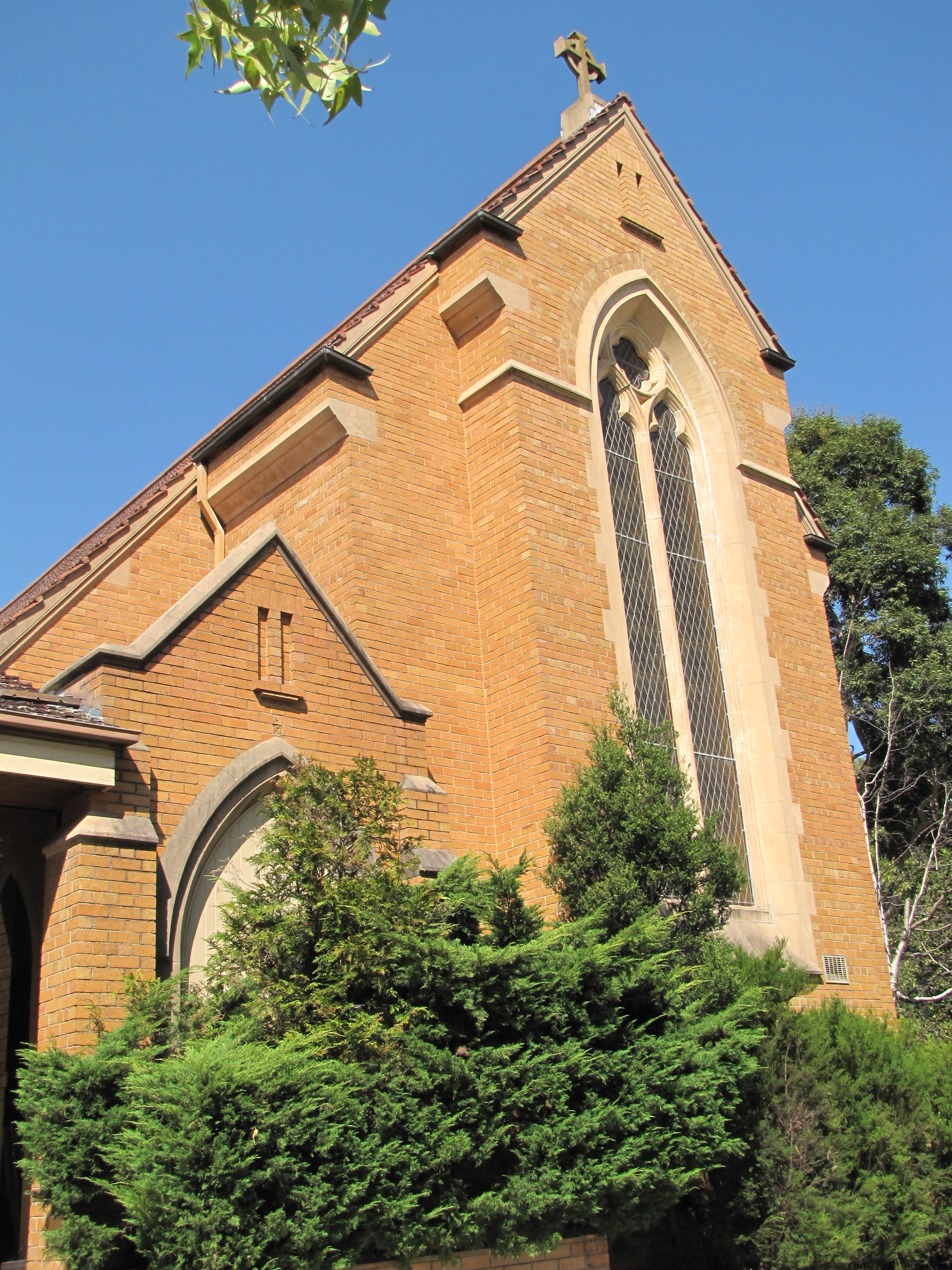
- St Hilary's Anglican Church, Kew (2010)
- St Hilary's Anglican Church
- 37.811150°S 145.052270°E
- Location: Kew; Balwyn North; Mont Albert North
- Country: Australia
- Denomination: Anglican Church of Australia
- Website: sthils.com.au

History
- Founded: 1888
- Consecrated: 1943

Architecture
- Architect(s): Albert Purchas; Louis Williams
- Completed: 1939

Administration
- Province: Victoria
- Diocese: Melbourne

Clergy
- Vicar(s): Adam Cetrangolo; Peter Corney (vicar emeritus)

St Hilary's Anglican Church is the overarching name of a collection of Anglican churches in Melbourne, Australia, consisting of St Hilary's Anglican Church (Kew), St Silas Anglican Church (North Balwyn) and St Augustine's Anglican Church (Mont Albert North), also known previously as the SHAC Community.

The parish is located in Melbourne's inner east and also manages a campsite near Bairnsdale, Victoria on the Banksia Peninsula which is called ‘Coromorant by the Lakes’.

== History ==
The church is named in honour of Saint Hilary, Bishop of Poitiers in modern day France, who worked at evangelising the Roman region of Gaul.

St Hilary's Anglican Church was established in 1888 when the original wooden church building was completed, seating up to 450 people and designed by architect, Albert Purchas. By 1905, the wooden church’s debt was paid off, which led to parishioners to ask the Archbishop of Melbourne, Lowther Clarke to consecrate the building. However, this was rejected due to the use of wood instead of stone. The current church building was initially designed in the 1920s, but was delayed due to the Great Depression. It was later designed by Louis Williams and opened in 1939 and finally consecrated in 1943 by Archbishop Joseph Booth. St Silas Anglican Church commenced in 1942 with the current church building consecrated in 1962. St Augustine's Anglican Church commenced in 1960 and was consecrated shortly afterwards. Both churches were formed due to ‘church planting’ that originated from St Hilary’s in Kew.

Since the church was established, there have been several social groups that have connected with the life of the parish, including the St Hilary’s Tennis Club (established in 1922), the 6th Kew St Hilary’s Boy Scouts Troop (established in 1930) and the St Hilary’s Girl Guides Group, Kew (established in 1931). Only the Girl Guides still use St Hilary’s with the Tennis Club closing in the 1980s (due to a car park being built) and the Scout troop merging with other troops in Kew in 2005.

In 1929, the Nelson-Heintz Memorial Hall was opened which houses the Sunday school classes and former library for youth and children to develop their faith. In 1988, a modern front extension was completed that connected the hall and the church with various modern offices for the parish staff to use. This extension also allowed for parishioners to meet in a courtyard that was made between the two buildings.

During the period between the 1980s and early 2010s, the church welcomed an average of 1,000 parishioners every Sunday for their three Sunday services at Kew. This was mainly due to Peter Corney’s initiatives at making the church more contemporary and evangelical. This included more modern musical worship instead of a choir and pipe organ. In addition to this growth, under next Lead Minister of St Hilary's, Paul Perini expanded the church in 2005 to encompass St Silas Anglican Church. Later on, this was followed by St Augustine's Anglican Church, where there is now a large Chinese speaking congregation which Lead Minister, Stephen Hale fostered.

In May 2021, the church building roof at Kew collapsed in on itself. This led to major restoration efforts. Later on, the church was found to have a flooded floor in the building, which increased the work related to fixing and ultimately renovating the church after nearly 90 years since the current church building was first opened. The ultimate bill for repairs was over $1 million according to the Lead Minister at the time, Adam Cetrangolo. In November 2022, the church was reopened for complete use.

On the morning of January 10, 2025, a fire broke out at the Kew site of the St Hilary's network, leading to significant damage to the main building. This included part of the roof of the church, the kitchen and the linking building between the hall and church. The vicar, Adam Cetrangolo, alongside Fire Rescue Victoria and the local Boroondara Council, estimated the repair damages to be up in the hundreds-of-thousands, with no lives lost or injured.

== Vicars ==
There have been a total of nine vicars of St Hilary's since the church was established in 1888. The current vicar, the Reverend Adam Cetrangolo, was commissioned by the Archbishop of Melbourne, the Most Reverend Philip Freier, in July 2021. The Venerable Peter Corney has been the honorary vicar emeritus since retiring as vicar in 1999.

Vicars / Lead Ministers of St Hilary’s
Years served	Name
1888 – 1891	Harry Mercer
1892 – 1912	Harry Collier
1912 – 1929	Charles Barnes
1929 – 1950	Arthur Mace
1950 – 1975	William Lloyd
1975 – 1999	Peter Corney
1999 – 2009	Paul Perini
2009 – 2020	Stephen Hale
2021 – present	Adam Cetrangolo

== Ministries ==
There are a total of five congregations that meet every Sunday at the three sites.

The church has a close working relationship with Mustard Schools Ministry and Alpha, which aims to support students in developing their Christian faith in high school and university. The church also works with Oak Tree. There are also various mission partners throughout Australia and in developing countries that St Hilary’s has supported for many years.

The church works with close association with HOPE and other churches in the area that provides aid including food and resources to people in need in the Boroondara Area. There is also an Op shop that the church runs with the St Hilary’s Hope subsidiary that provides donated clothing for disadvantaged people in the community.

== See also ==
- Anglican Church of Australia
- Anglican Diocese of Melbourne
- Christianity in Australia
- Ridley College (Melbourne)
