= St Andrew's Church, Brighton =

Heritage-listed Anglican church in Melbourne, Victoria, Australia

St Andrew's Brighton
- The Church of Saint Andrew, Brighton, Melbourne
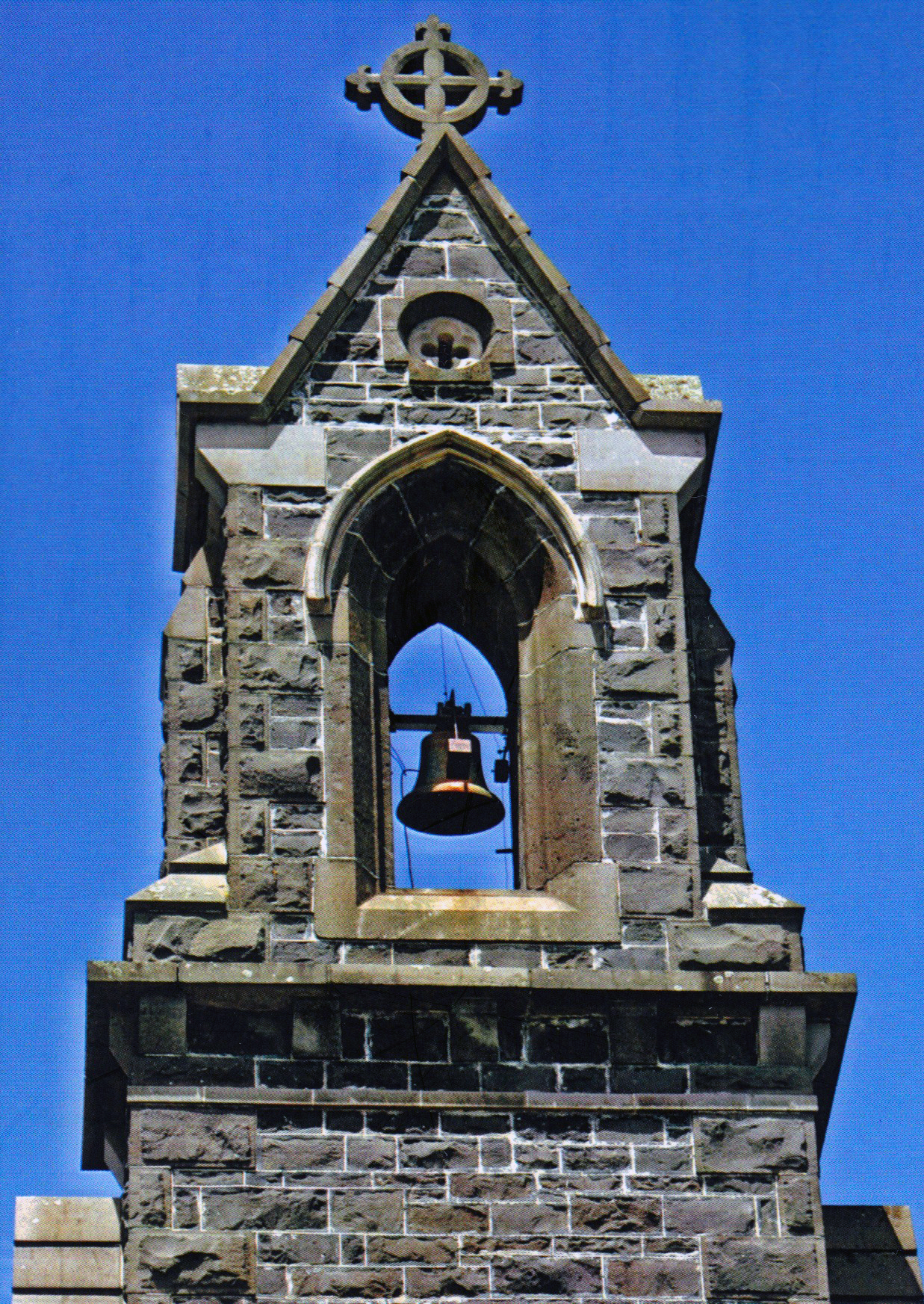
- The bellcote on the gable of the Pioneer Chapel, built in 1857 to crown the western facade of the third St Andrew's Church building and the main entrance to St Andrew's Church for over a century.
- St Andrew's Brighton
- 37°54′41″S 144°59′34″E
- Location: New Street, Brighton, City of Bayside, Melbourne, Victoria
- Country: Australia
- Denomination: Anglican
- Website: standrewsbrighton.org.au

History
- Status: Parish church
- Founded: 1842; 184 years ago

Architecture
- Functional status: Active
- Architects: Louis Williams; Charles Webb
- Architectural type: Church
- Style: Early English Gothic; Modern Gothic
- Years built: 1842, 1857, 1961-1962

Administration
- Province: Victoria
- Diocese: Melbourne

Clergy
- Vicar: Rev'd Ian Morrison SCP
- Location of the church in Greater Metropolitan Melbourne

Victorian Heritage Register
- Official name: St Andrews Church Precinct
- Type: Registered place; Registered object integral to a registered place
- Designated: 13 May 2010
- Reference no.: H0124
- Heritage overlay no.: HO96
- Categories: Cemeteries and Burial Sites; Education; Religion

Register of the National Estate
- Official name: St Andrews Anglican Church; and Church School House
- Type: Defunct register
- Designated: 21 October 1980
- Reference no.: 5728; 5725

St Andrew's Brighton is the Anglican parish church of the beachside suburb of Brighton, in the City of Bayside, in the south-eastern suburbs of Melbourne, in Victoria, Australia. It is the oldest continuous Anglican church in Victoria.

Opened on St Andrew's Day in 1842, St Andrew's was one of the earliest Christian churches established in the Port Phillip District and predates both the Anglican Diocese of Melbourne and the colony, now state, of Victoria. Located in a large historic precinct in Middle Brighton, including a rare pre-gold rush graveyard, St Andrew's is one of Australia's most notable churches, known for its liturgical and musical tradition since the mid 19th century.

Built from 1843 on the traditional lands of the Bunurong people, the church precinct was added to the Victorian Heritage Register on 13 May 2010 in recognition of its historical, architectural, and aesthetic significance; and was also added to non-statutory lists by the Victorian branch of the National Trust on 4 August 1997 and the now defunct Register of the National Estate on 21 October 1980.

The present building, opened in 1962, was designed by the noted Australian architect Louis Williams to become the cathedral for the proposed diocese of the Mornington Peninsula following the planned division of the Diocese of Melbourne. Although the Melbourne diocese remained intact, St Andrew's was completed to be one of the largest church buildings in Australia; its vast and versatile space has been described as the "Cathedral of Light".

St Andrew's Brighton maintains close and historic ties with both Brighton Grammar School and Firbank Grammar School.

== Location ==
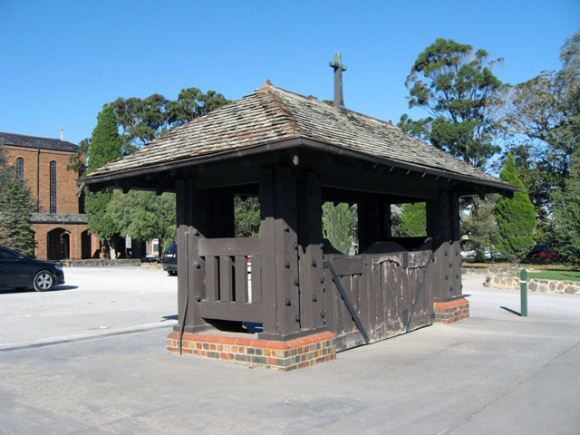
The lych gate, built in 1926 at the main New Street entrance

Set amidst an extensive landscaped historic precinct 500 metres (1,600 ft) from the Brighton beach, the land of St Andrew's Brighton is on the eastern side of New Street in Middle Brighton. The church lent its name to the other property boundaries to the south and east: Church Street and St Andrews Street. To the north, St Andrew's grounds border Brighton Grammar School, as in the 1920s the school received in trust two hectares (five acres) of the original four hectares (ten acres) granted to the church in 1841.

The main church car parking area is entered from New Street, to the north of the corner of Church and New Streets; the entry to the car park is at the site of the rustic timber lych gate, built to the west of the church in 1926 in the Arts and Crafts style, possibly designed by Williams.

== Early history: 1840 ==
In 1840, the first recorded church services at Waterville, as the Brighton area was then known, were held in a tent. In May 1841, four hectares (ten acres) were set aside as a Church of England Reserve in the "Brighton Estate" planned by Henry Dendy and Jonathan Binns Were. This "Church Reserve" site was located in the planned small township of fashionable crescents, between the outer crescent and desirable allotments that ran to Port Phillip Bay.

=== Opening on St Andrew's Day: 1842 ===
In 1842, the first St Andrew's Church building was opened on 30 November. As the day of the opening of the first church building was dedicated to Saint Andrew in the church calendar, the parish was named St Andrew's. Although St Andrew's Brighton was the second Anglican church established in the [ort Phillip District, following the elevation of St James’ Church, Melbourne to Cathedral status in 1848 and the subsequent closure of the St James’ Old Cathedral building in 1912 and the consequent removal of the building to new land in West Melbourne in 1913–1914, St Andrew's Brighton has the longest continuous history of any Anglican church in Victoria. The Revd Adam Compton Thomson, the only Anglican priest in the Port Phillip District at the time, opened the first building and was the first to minister to the Brighton congregation.

=== Graveyard: 1843 ===
On 24 October 1843, the one-hectare (two-acre) St Andrew's Graveyard, established to the north-east of the first building, was consecrated by Bishop William Grant Broughton, the first and only Bishop of Australia. The graveyard was the first portion of the existing church land to be used for religious purposes and is a rare surviving example in Victoria of a pre-gold rush graveyard. The first burial took place the following year, well before the opening of the Brighton General Cemetery in 1855, and St Andrew's Cemetery was the major burial ground for the district. More than 300 burials took place, mostly before 1860, and the graves of many district pioneers are located in the graveyard. After over 100 years of interments, the last burial took place in 1948. However, the adjoining garden of remembrance, established in 1953, remains in use. Melbourne's oldest churchyard cemetery, the St Andrew's Graveyard is one of only four remaining churchyard cemeteries in Melbourne.

== Original buildings ==
=== First church and school building: 1842 ===
Opened on St Andrew's Day, 30 November 1842, this small stone building, erected to the south of the present site in 1842 as No. 1 St Andrews Street, was used as a church and school. However, the north-western extension of Church Street, from St Andrews Street to the junction with New Street, isolated the southern portion of the "Church Reserve" from the main site soon after construction. This southern portion was not conveyed to the church in 1843 and other development took place on that land. The building seated 100 people, about 20% of the local population of 500, and was one of the first church buildings in the south-eastern mainland of the Diocese of Australia. In 1843, it was recorded that 75 pupils were enrolled at the newly established St Andrew's School, which was officially opened as School No. 44 in 1849 by Church of England authorities.

=== Second church building: 1850 ===
On 29 August 1850, The Right Reverend Charles Perry, the Bishop of Melbourne, laid the foundation stone for a rectangular ironstone church, designed by architect, Melbourne city surveyor and St Andrew's parishioner, Charles Laing. This building was erected to the north-west of the St Andrew's Graveyard, featured plastered brick reveals and trims, was Gothic Revival in style and included a tower that was never built in the scheme. Seating 250 people, it was opened on 12 October 1851 by The Revd William Brickwood, Vicar from 1849 to 1853. In the late 1920s, the present Vicarage was built on the site of this second church building.

=== Third church building and school house: 1857 ===
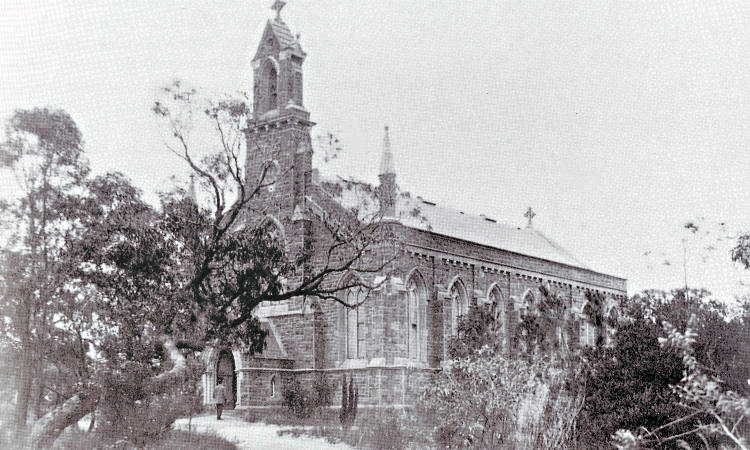
St Andrew's Church, Brighton, designed by Charles Webb and built in 1857

By 1857, the congregation had outgrown the second church building. The parishioner, Brighton resident and prolific Melbourne architect Charles Webb, and his partner Thomas Taylor, were commissioned to design a new bluestone church, school house and vicarage. "King Webb" designed the new bluestone church in the Early English Gothic style, with a prominent bellcote surmounting the gable, a small gabled western entrance porch, a seven-bay nave and small chancel. Webb's building was considered "one of the more perfect examples of a church of the period in the Colony" and the majority of the building, including the distinctive western facade, remains a Brighton landmark.

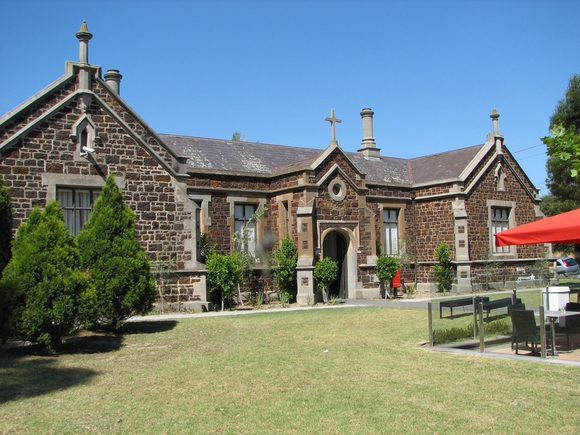
St Andrew's School House, Brighton

The ironstone church building was demolished and some of the stone used in the construction of a T-shaped school house building. St Andrew's School, originally established in the first small wooden church building 15 years earlier, continued to operate in this ironstone school building until 1875 when students were relocated to a new school in Brighton, established after the state school system was introduced in 1872. The school house was then used for Sunday School and other church activities.

In 1886, a north wing was added to the school house building, creating the symmetrical H-shaped building which survives today. Designed in a Gothic Revival style, the symmetrical H-shaped school house is constructed of random coursed, locally quarried ironstone and is roofed in slate. It has projecting gabled end wings, a central projecting entry porch and render detailing that includes parapets, finials, angle buttresses, window and door surrounds and gable vents. When additions were made to the church building in 1886, the altar and furnishings from the demolition of the chancel were installed in the central space of the school house. The building is currently used as a café and coffee shop.

St Andrew's School House is of architectural and historical significance as one of the few surviving examples of Charles Webb's distinctive institutional buildings, as a rare example of a building constructed of local ironstone and as a rare surviving example of a substantial early denominational school building.

=== Third church building enlargement: 1886 ===
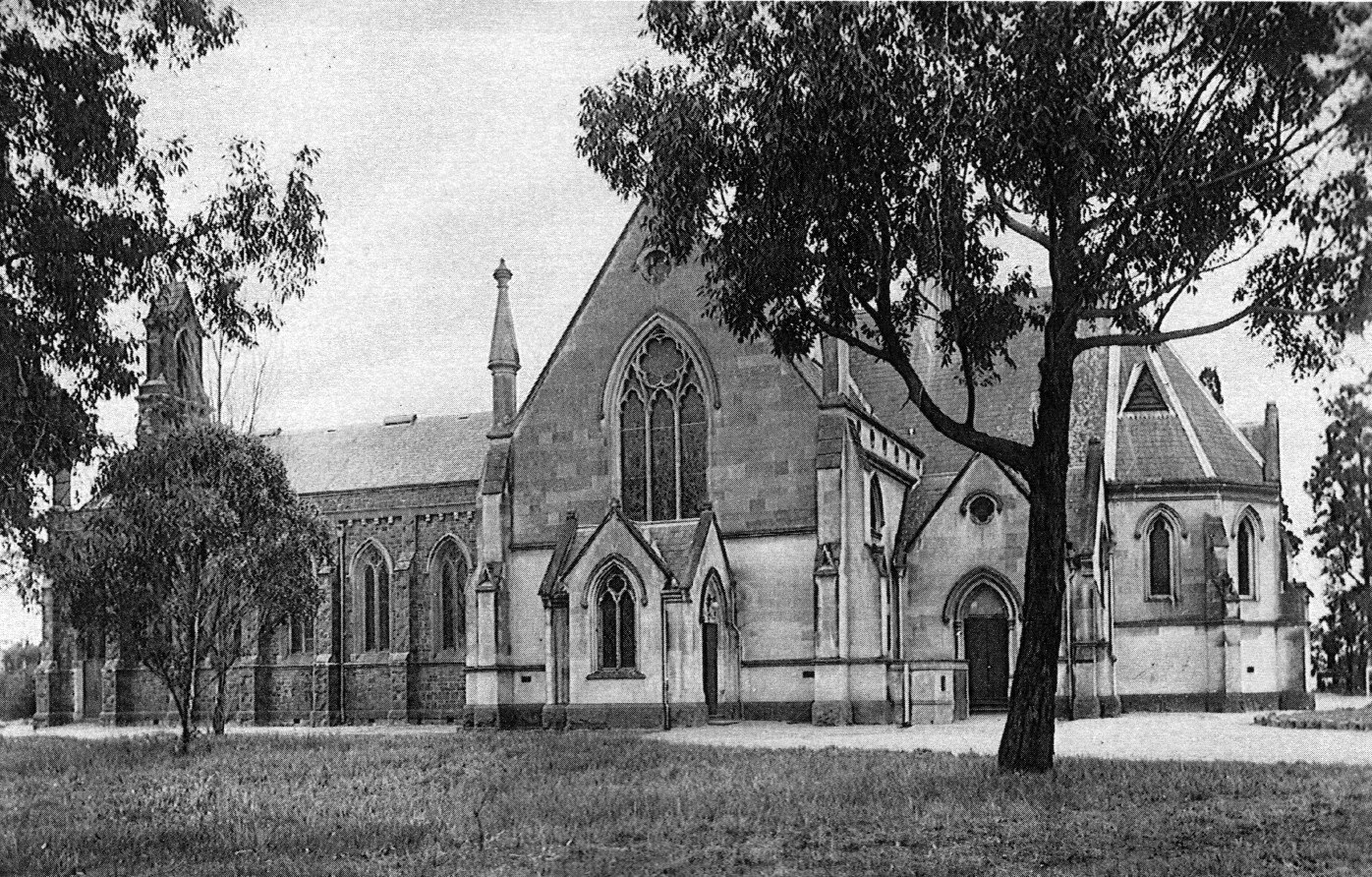
The 1886 Lloyd Tayler additions to St Andrew's Church, viewed from the south transept

In the 1860s and 1870s, Brighton further expanded as a desirable beach-side suburb and by 1886 necessary additions were made to the church.

Large sandstone transepts and an apsidal chancel were added to the existing bluestone church by 'probably the best known figure in the architectural profession in Melbourne', architect Lloyd Tayler. Built in the High Victorian Gothic style, and constructed of Oamaru limestone from New Zealand, Charles Webb's bluestone church served as the nave in the enlarged building.

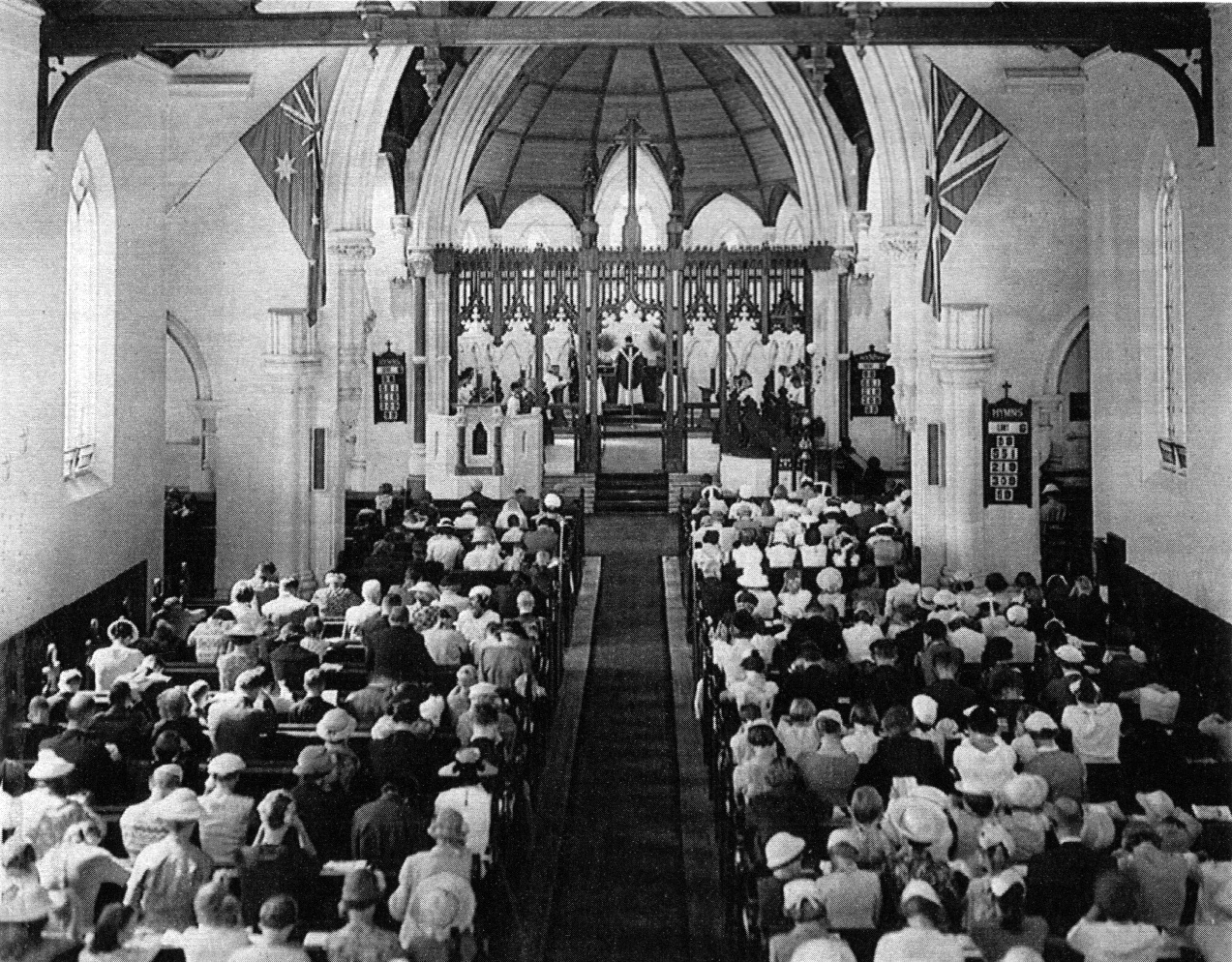
The 1857 Charles Webb nave looking east, through the rood screen, to the 1886 Lloyd Tayler chancel

As the simpler Early English Gothic and decorated High Victorian Gothic architectural styles were not considered visually compatible, there was provision for either replacing the bluestone nave, or cladding it in Oamaru limestone to complement the transepts and chancel.

The 1886 Lloyd Tayler interior featured elaborate woodwork in the sanctuary fittings including a large rood screen and divided choir stalls, and magnificent stained glass windows in the transepts and chancel. The designs for Tayler's additions, opened in August 1886 and costing £7,000 – a substantial sum for the time, were clearly influenced by the most prolific 19th century Gothic Revivalists, including A.W.N. Pugin and Sir George Gilbert Scott.

=== Parish hall: 1928 ===
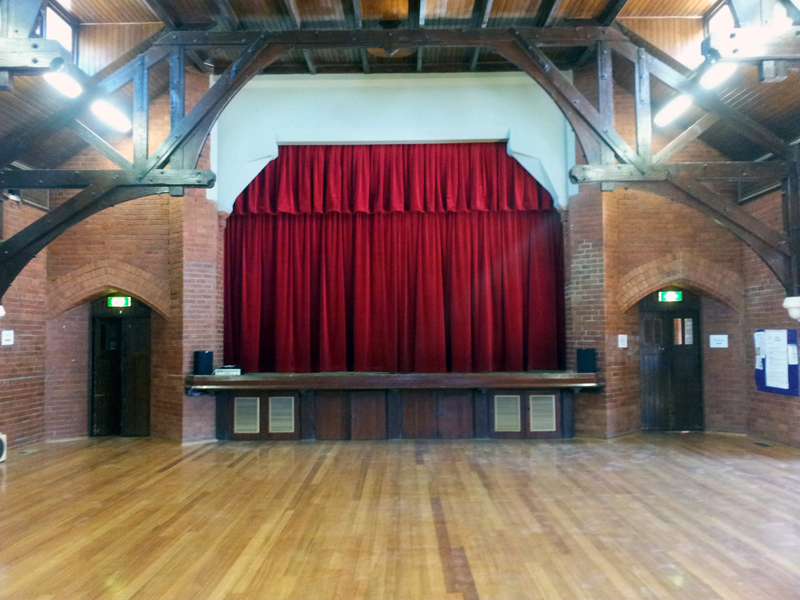
St Andrew's Parish Hall showing the oversized timber hammer beam trusses

In 1928, St Andrew's Parish Hall, designed by the renowned Australian church architect and parishioner, Louis Williams, was built to the east of the 19th century school house building. This large Arts and Crafts-influenced building facing St Andrews Street is constructed of clinker brick and the symmetrical front facade contains a broad central jerkinhead gable roof.

The exposed brick interior of the building contains oversized timber hammer beam trusses and large folding timber doors that line both sides of the central hall. All timberwork remains unpainted. The Parish Hall is used daily by numerous organizations for a large variety of events.

=== Fire: 1961 ===
In 1954, over seventy years after the construction of the transepts and chancel, the nave of Lloyd Tayler's grand design for the church building had not been completed, and proposals were made by the noted Melbourne architect John F. D. Scarborough to demolish the 1857 bluestone building, still functioning as the nave, and rebuild a wider nave using the bluestone facings and arches.

Scarborough's proposals did not proceed, and the 1857 nave and 1886 transepts and chancel were largely destroyed by a devastating fire on Sunday evening 19 February 1961. Given the nave timber ceiling over a century old, the fire quickly engulfed the building and the damage was such that a restoration was impractical, even had that been considered appropriate. The following day, Louis Williams was appointed to be the architect for a new church building.

== Present church complex: 1962 ==
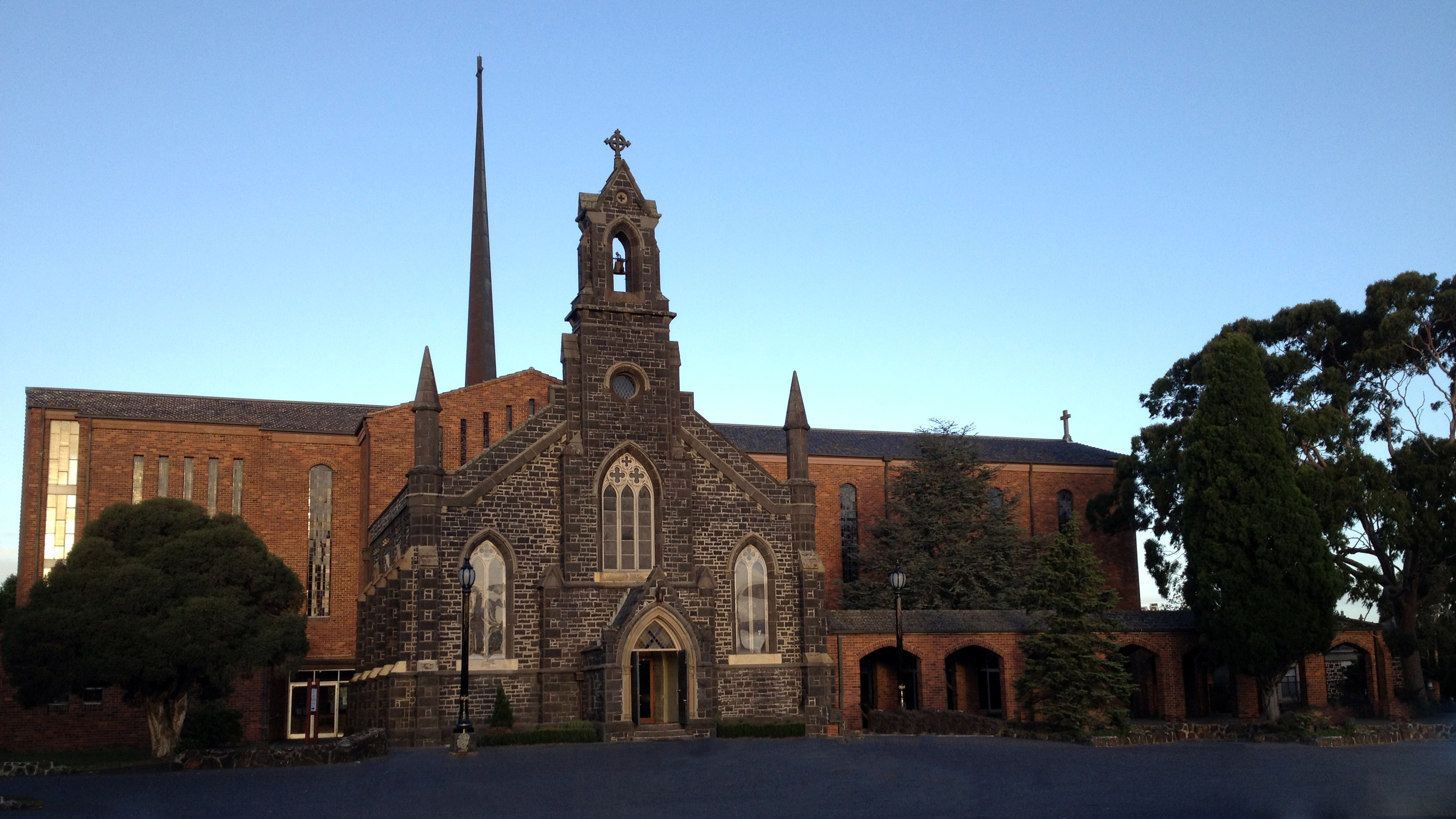
St Andrew's Church viewed from New Street, Brighton. Note the pointed copper flèche, a local landmark, rising above the building.

The present St Andrew's Church complex is among the largest church buildings in Australasia. Using over 500,000 bricks and over 16,000 roof tiles, the space consists of three major conjoined internal areas: the main church building, the Pioneer Chapel and the lady chapel.

The present church building, a Melbourne landmark, was dedicated on 15 December 1962 in the presence of the Governor of Victoria, Sir Dallas Brooks; Frank Woods, Anglican Archbishop of Melbourne, other clergy, and two thousand people.

=== Main church ===
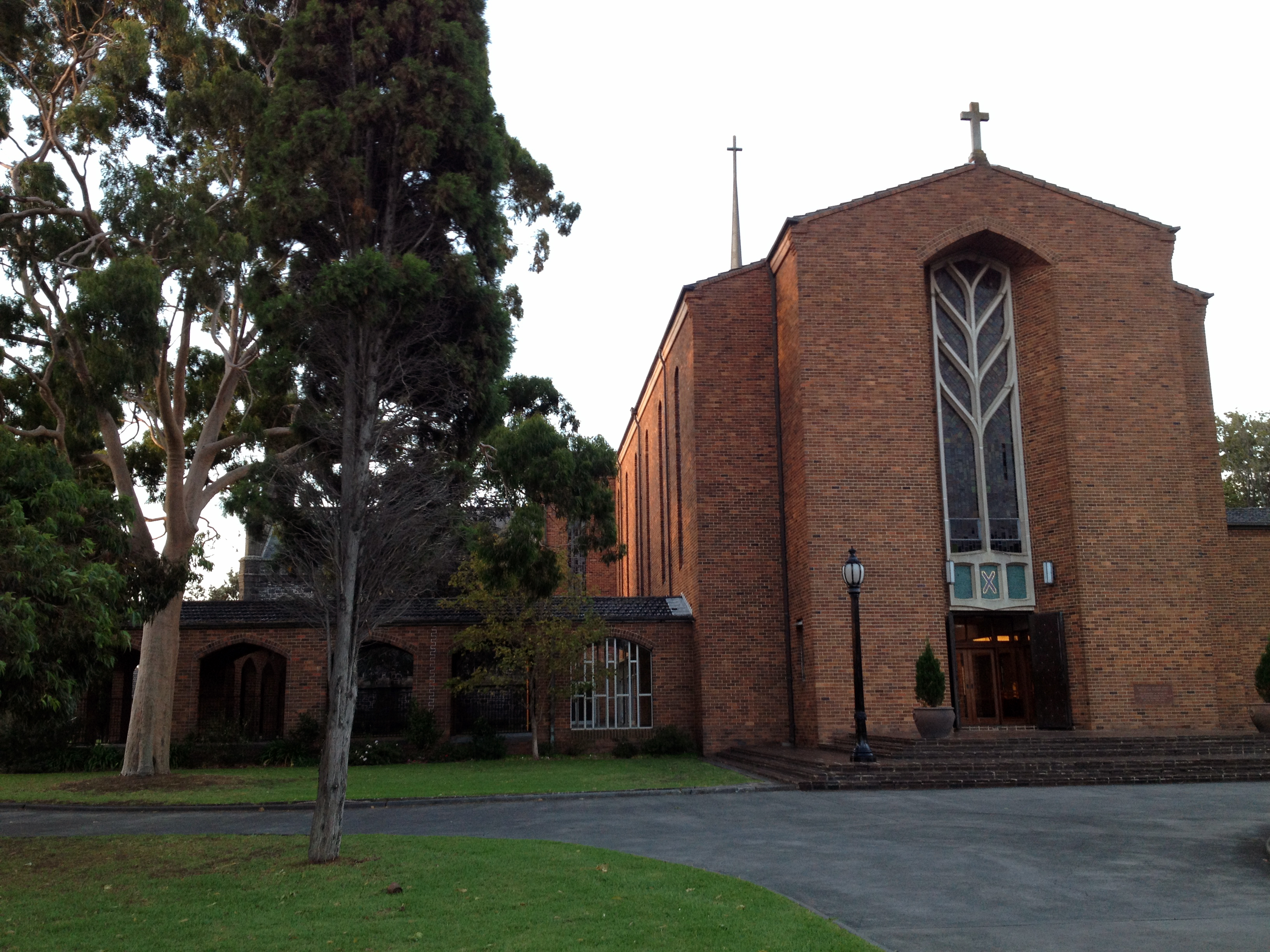
The main entrance to St Andrew's Church

As it was decided to retain the west end and four bays from the nave of Charles Webb's bluestone church built in 1857, the main section of the new church building, incorporating a new nave, transepts and sanctuary, was reorientated and set at a right angle to the bluestone building, so the new nave was built on a north–south axis rather than the traditional liturgical east–west.

Sir Edward Maufe’s design for Guildford Cathedral in England, consecrated in 1961, was held up as “an example of good taste” for the design of the new St Andrew's Church and many of Louis Williams' personal ecclesiastical design ideas are also apparent at St Andrew's. Williams retained “the traditional layout of an Anglican church favoured by ecclesiologists in the 19th century and following the pre-Reformation pattern”, and used a modern Gothic style for overall design with modern materials and construction methods. Williams had used this conservative approach frequently and successfully in other smaller buildings in suburban Melbourne and country Victoria.

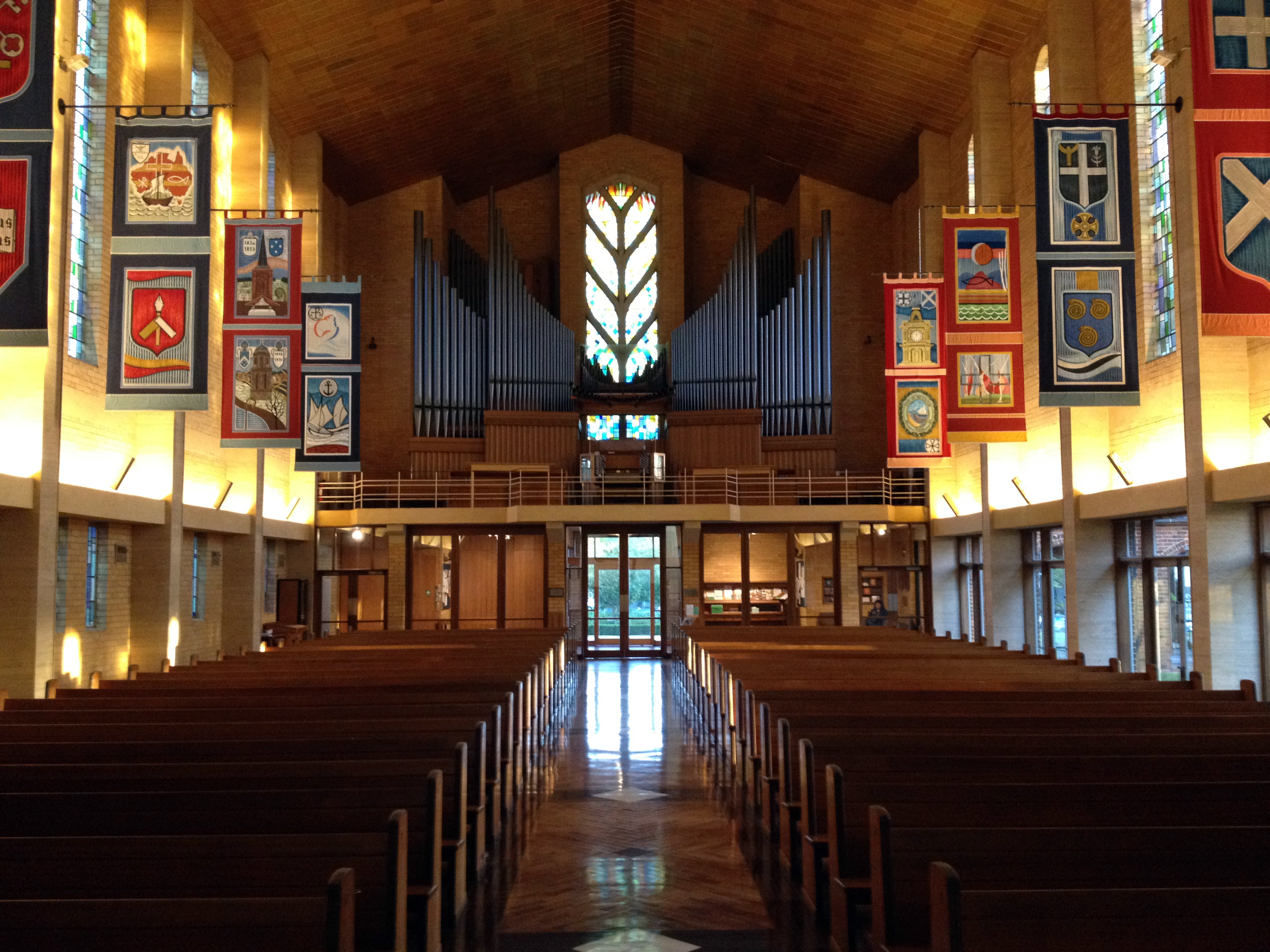
Nave looking "west" to the large pipe organ, branching out from the "Tree of Life" window

Williams’ desire for extremely generous planning is manifest throughout the main church with well-spaced pews, a clear view of the altar, wide aisles, a vast sanctuary and a large choir and organ gallery at the rear with a spacious narthex below. The narthex's low ceiling emphasises the height of the nave and sanctuary, "which is obvious as one enters the body of the church and the walls seem to rise in an impressive upsurge - 'an offering of height'."

The windowless recessed sanctuary wall, lit by concealed clear side windows, was originally intended to be enriched with a reredos of Venetian vitreous mosaic, "rising towards its summit in a stirring outburst of joyous, expressive colour". The commissioning of this large and colourful mosaic, however, was deferred and finished instead with a large cross. The sanctuary recess now features a bronze sculpture of the prodigal son by Guy Boyd below this "temporary" cross. The sculpture was installed in 1987, the new church building's 25th anniversary.

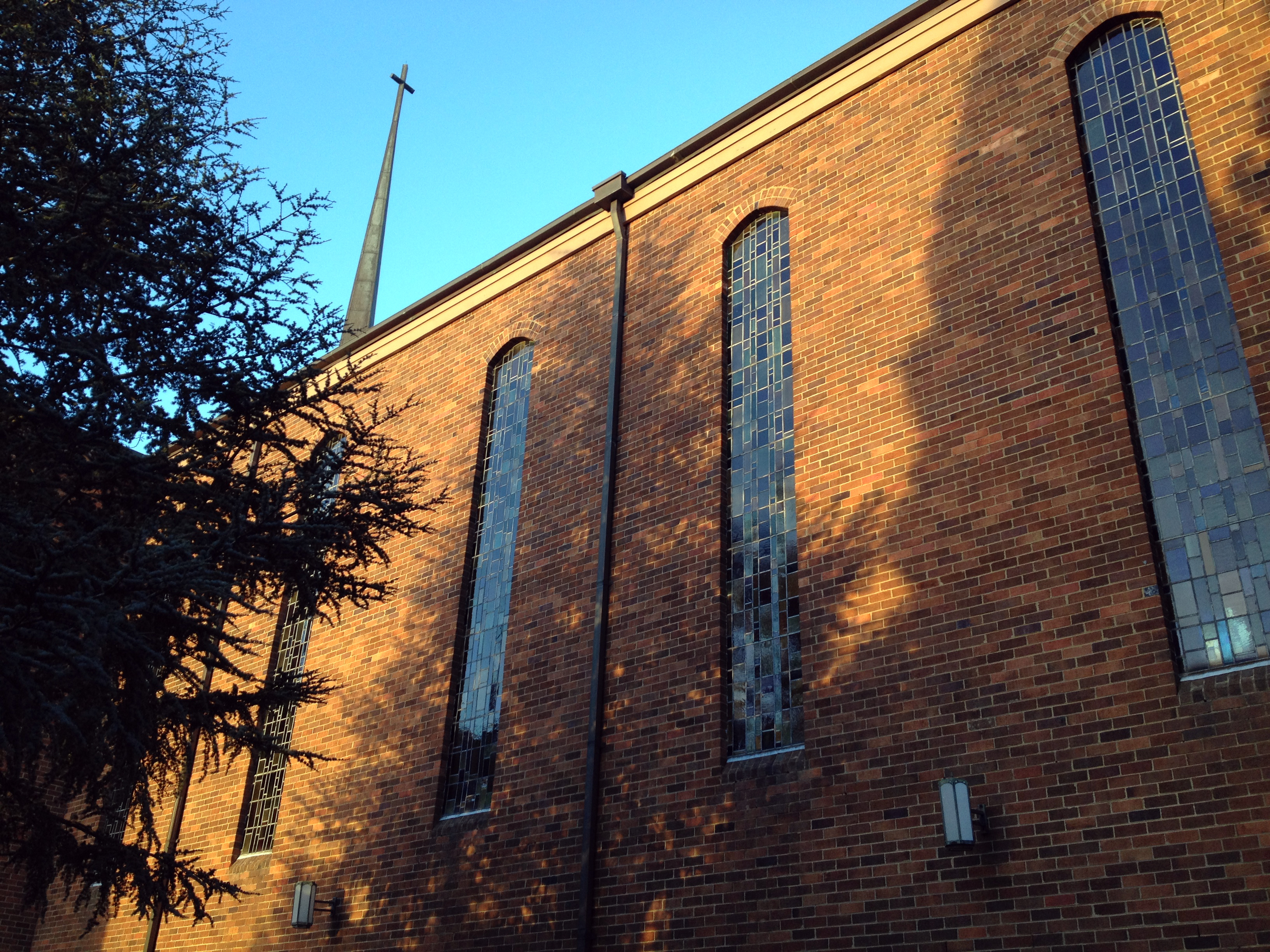
An external wall of the nave, showing some of the individual lancet windows filled with German-made "antique" glass

The main church building, of cruciform shape with shallow transepts, has a steel frame; red autumn-tinted "ripple-tex" brick was used for the exterior and hard-faced "oatmeal"-coloured cream brick for the interior. The dimensions are spacious: the building is almost 61 metres (200 ft) long; the nave is nearly 15 metres (50 ft) high with a distinctive ceiling of golden anodised aluminium tiles; externally, the copper flèche over the crossing is nearly 37 metres (120 ft) high.

The nave of the present building, the “Cathedral of Light”, is a vast light-filled space. Large stained glass windows and travertine piers dominate the cream brick walls; clear glass doors, placed the entire length of one side of the nave, open to the cloister garden.

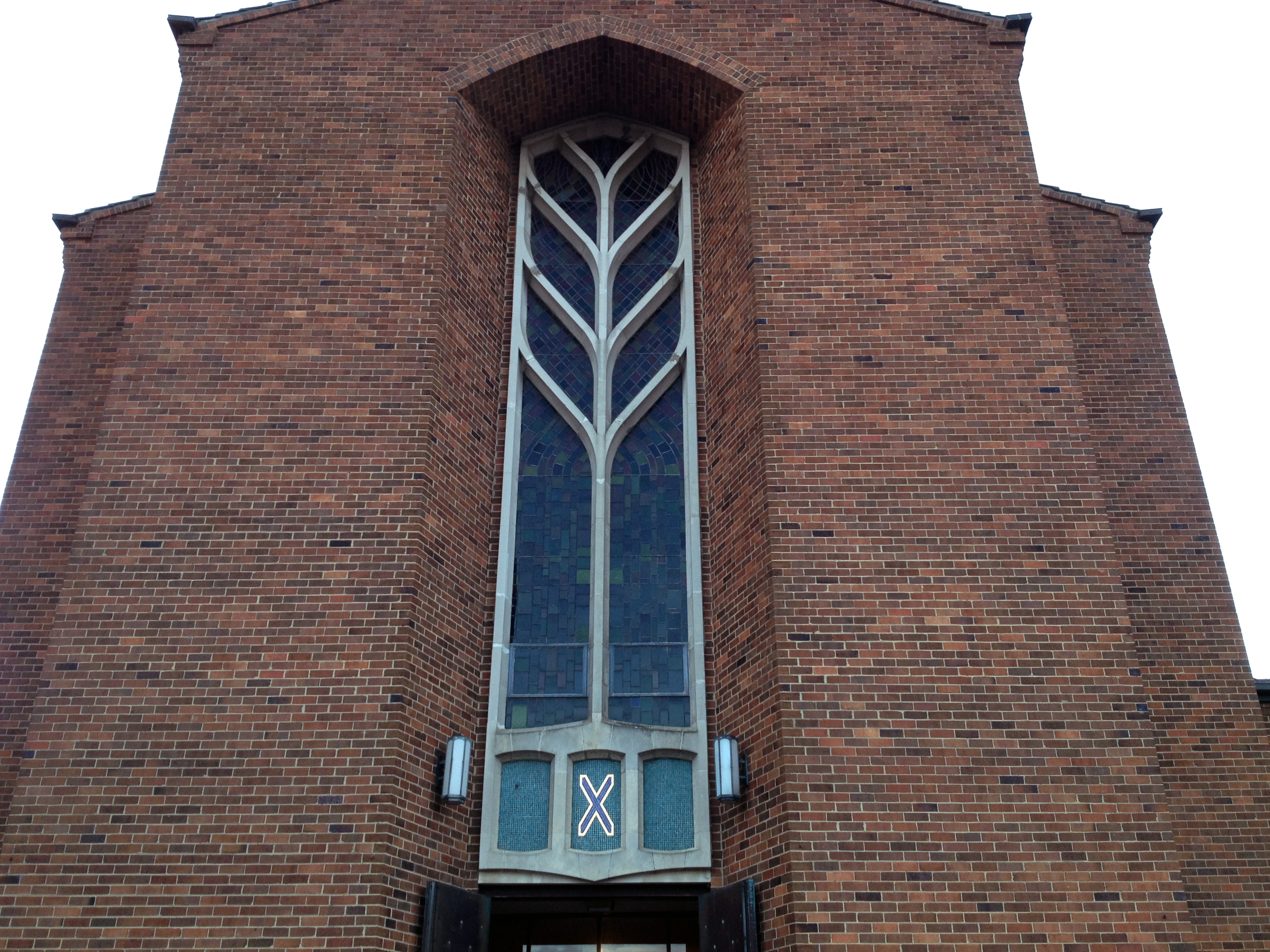
The middle of the external "west" front carries a large lancet arch alcove flanked by brickwork walls nearly 50 feet high incorporating the foundation stone for the 1962 building. Shown within the lancet alcove are the "Tree of Life" window and three-panelled mosaic, the central panel of which features the saltire or St Andrew's Cross

Many artistic features in the main building are the result of the close collaboration between Louis Williams and the Dutch-Australian artist Rein Slagmolen of Vetrart Studios, including the brass representations of the Four Evangelists on the 'Polylite' pulpit and lectern panels, the copper font cover featuring a dove and vine leaves, and the "Tree of Life" west window.

Using the German-made "antique" stained glass favoured by Williams, the windows in the nave are toned from quiet and cooler colours to richer and warmer colours as they progress to the sanctuary and the intended artistic highlight of the main building, the vibrant and multi-coloured sanctuary mosaic. The stained glass in the main building is non-figurative, relying instead on the colour gradation of the leadlight to imply symbolic references.

The sanctuary and baptistery windows are predominantly deep blues, greens and reds, while the large Tree of Life west window, by Rein Slagmolen, at the opposite end of the building, uses cool blues at the base rising to warm golds at the top of the window.

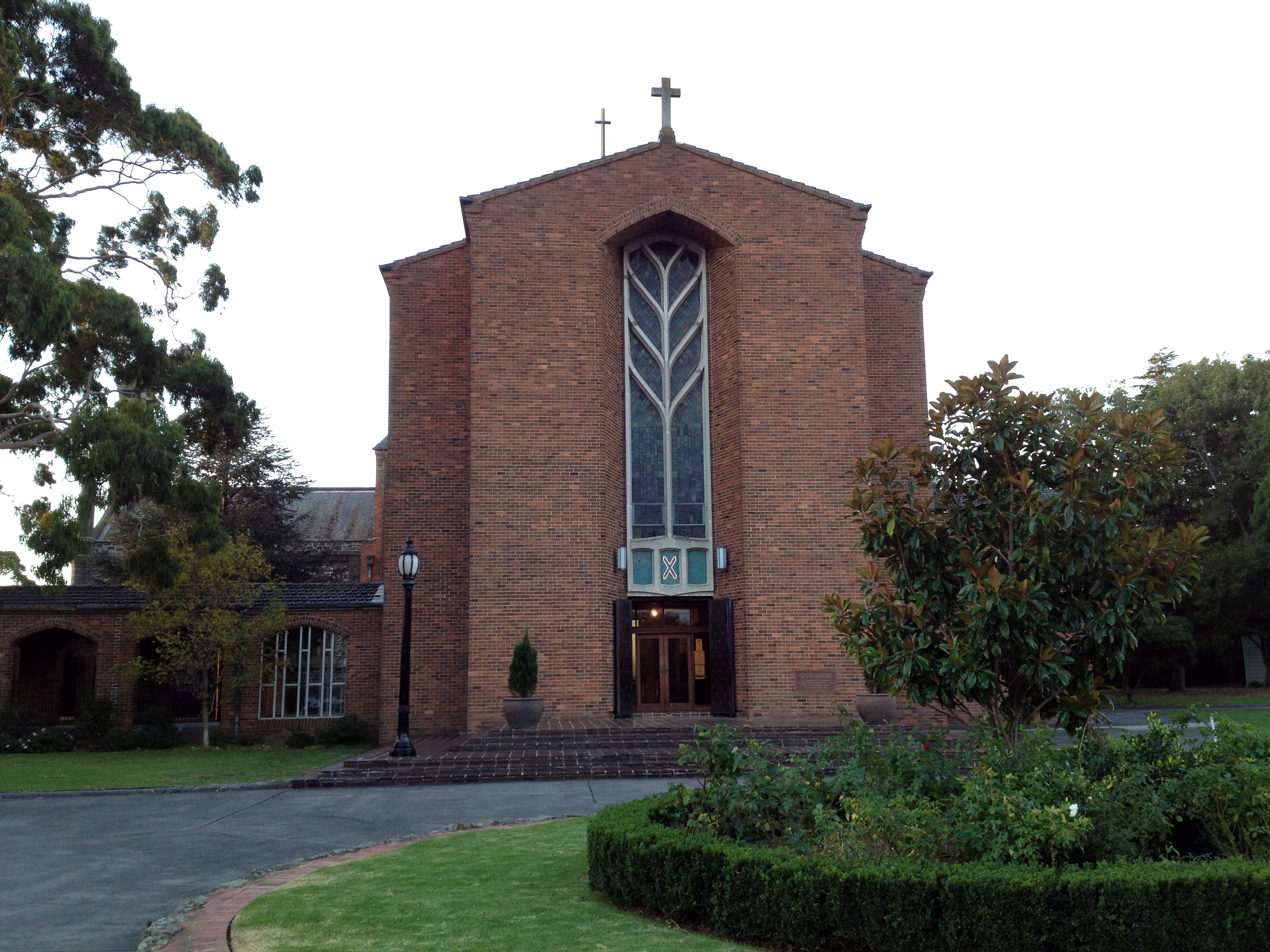
The "west" front of St Andrew's Church, showing the large Tree of Life great west window

The west window tracery was designed to suggest the branching of a tree; the impression is enhanced by the inclusion of leaf-shaped russet-coloured glass at the apex of the window and the large double-winged organ cases branching out from the "tree".

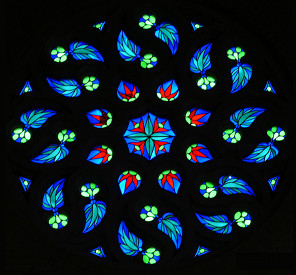
The rose window in the "south" transept

The south transept features a large and richly traceried rose window above the exposed pipework of the transept division of the pipe organ; the rose window tracery, with its "leaf-like pattern" also provides a subtle link to the Tree of Life west window.

The interior of the main church building stands as a testament to Williams’ intention to make the present St Andrew's nave “a symphony of light and colour” as distant as possible from the “dim religious light of the Victorian era”.

All the furniture and furnishings within the church building were made to Williams' designs, and represent one of the largest collections of mid-20th century ecclesiastical furniture in Australia.

=== Pioneer Chapel ===
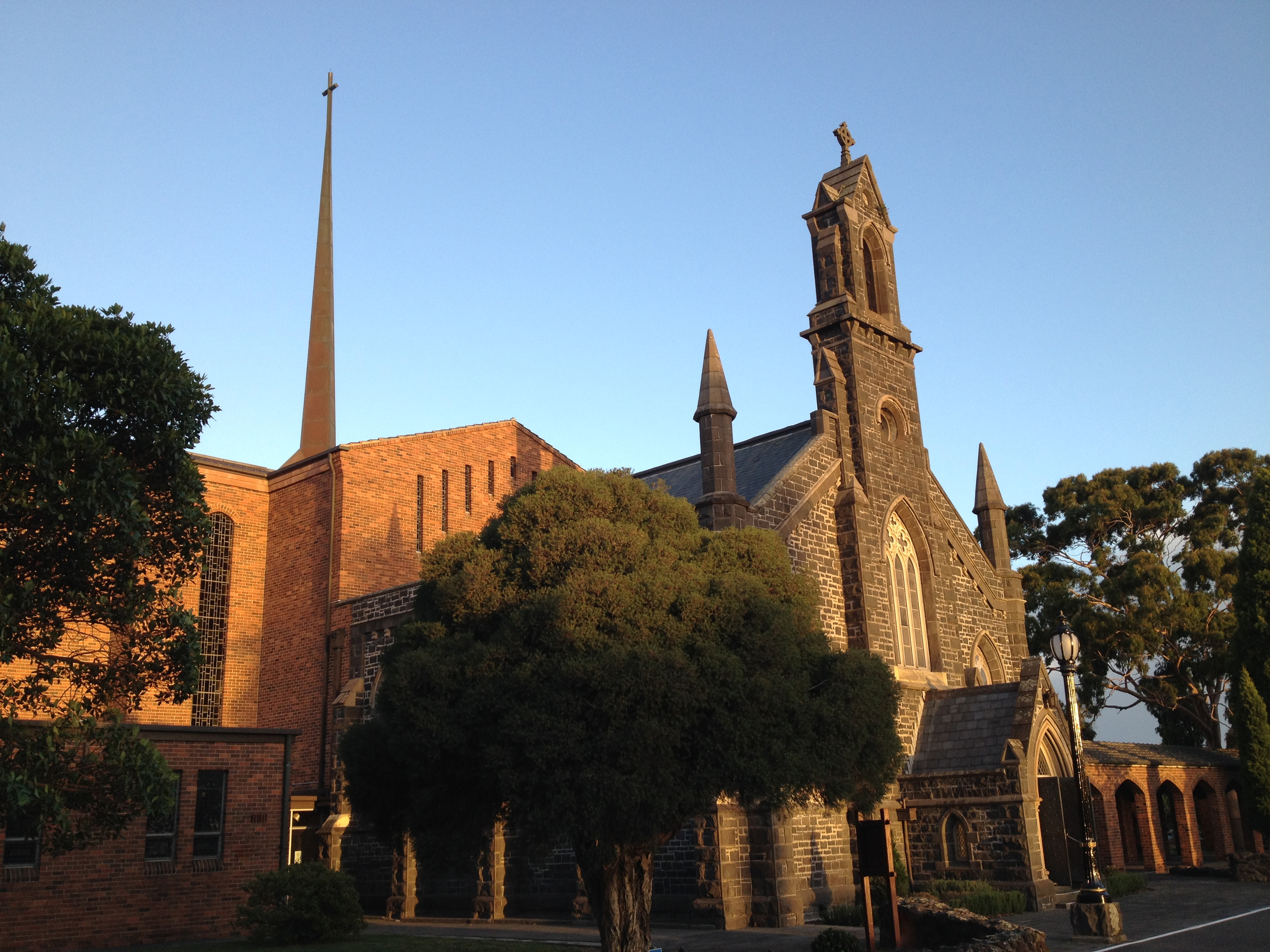
The Pioneer Chapel and, to the left, part of the chancel opened in 1962.

The old bluestone nave built in 1857, in Early English Gothic style and typical of the work of Charles Webb, remains as the Pioneer Memorial Chapel. In 1961, in order to reconcile the proportions of the old bluestone nave and convert it to its present use as a chapel and baptistery, three bays of the original seven-bay bluestone nave were demolished.

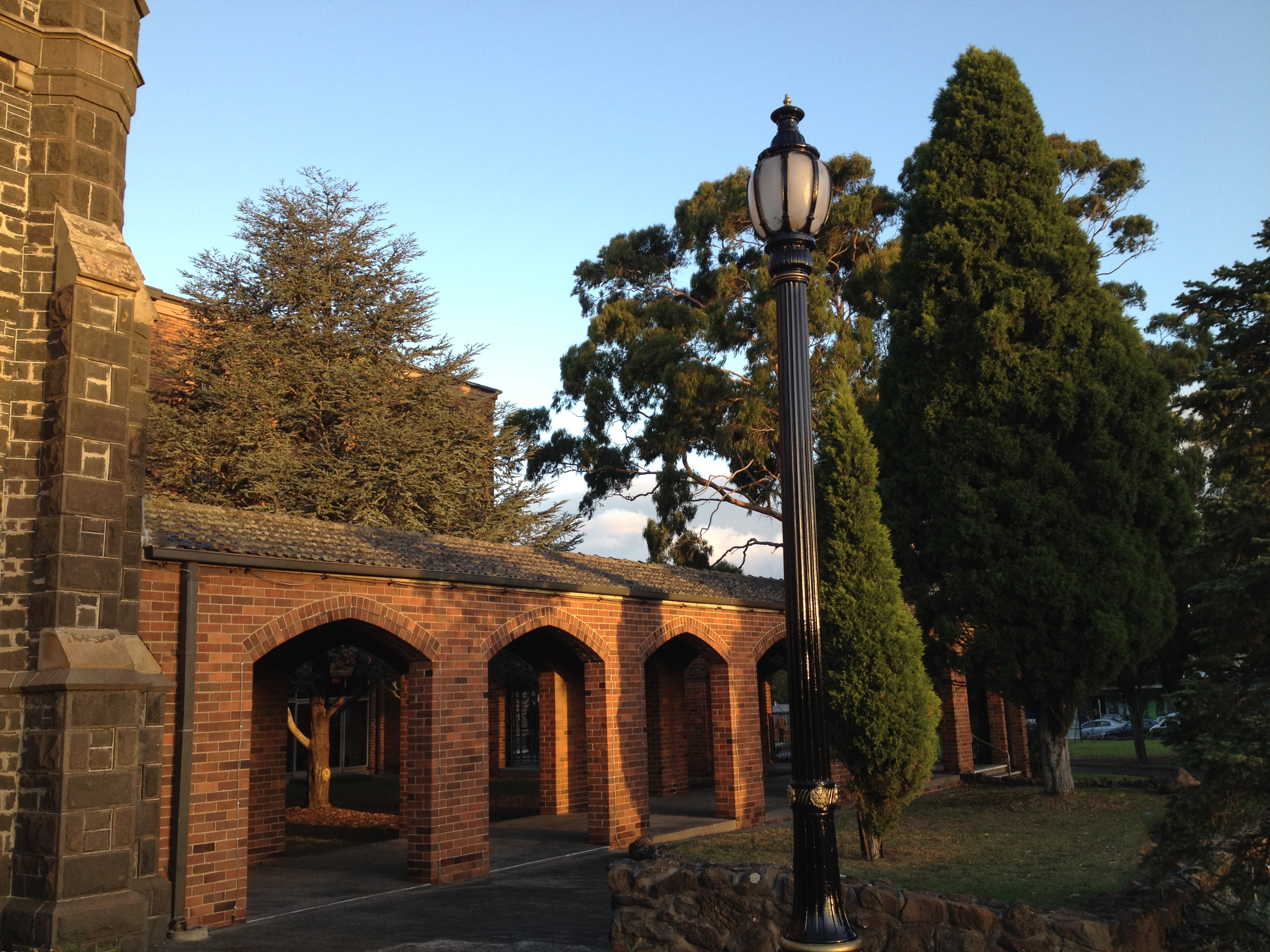
External view of part of the cloister

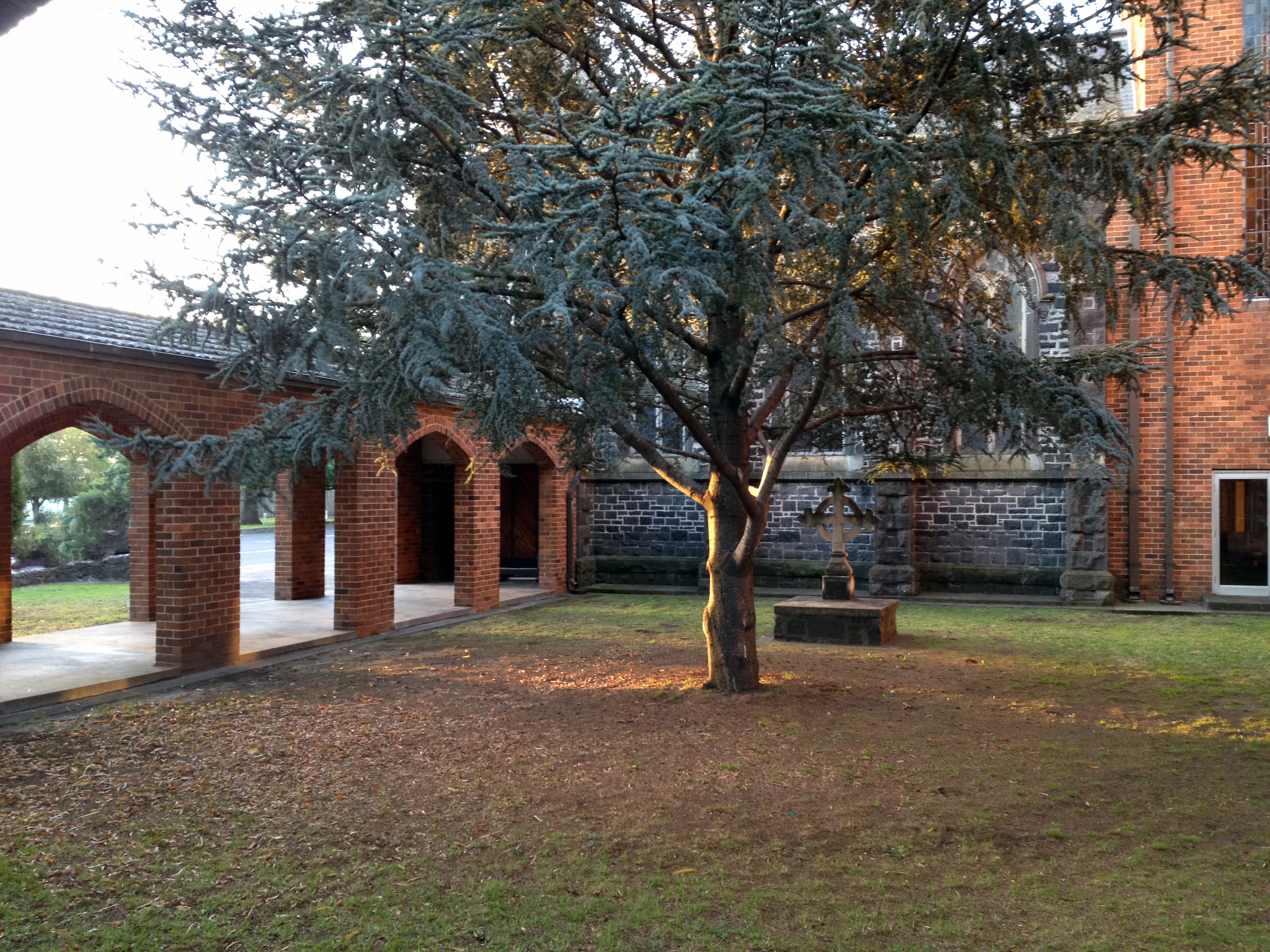
Cloister garden

Externally, the Pioneer Chapel is linked to the narthex of the new building by a large arcaded cloister with an internal cloister garden, extremely rare in any cathedral or church in Australasia.

Significantly, the original west end of the 1857 bluestone church building, a distinctive Brighton landmark with its prominent bellcote, bracketed string course, triple lancet window tracery, pinnacled corner buttresses and original main entrance porch remains as the symmetrical western façade of the Pioneer Chapel.

As the original triple lancet west window was destroyed in the 1961 fire, the opportunity was taken to commission a mural from the leading one-armed Australian muralist Napier Waller to complete the internal western wall of the chapel; externally, the stone tracery remains with blacked-in stone. The Pioneer Memorial Mural depicts the “pioneers of Brighton landing from Port Phillip Bay and setting about the task of building a new church.”

=== Lady Chapel ===
This intimate space, to the north-west of the crossing in the main church, was designed as the Chapel of the Incarnation. The stained glass windows by David Taylor Kellock, a Scottish-trained Ballarat artist favoured by Louis Williams, represent “the work of Christ and His Church in the redemption of the world in all its aspects”.

The Lady Chapel windows are among the most successful examples of Kellock's work; the repetition of the "Tree of Life" west window "tree-form" tracery within the stained glass unifies these figurative windows with the non-figurative windows of the main building and gave Kellock the basic composition for each scene.

In addition to the six Kellock stained glass windows, the Lady Chapel also houses a notable dossal (“The Crowning of the Virgin”) and altar frontal (“There is a Green Hill far away”) by Beryl Dean, the leading ecclesiastical textile artist.

=== Relationship with local schools ===
Over the course of Brighton Grammar School's history, it has used St Andrew's Church as the main location for its weekly chapel services and musical recitals. The other prominent private school in Brighton, Firbank Grammar School, has had a similar relationship. Both schools offer the St Andrew's Choir scholarship to those students with musical ability and willingness to participate in the St Andrew's Choir. Both school crests are part of the 'west' entryway flooring ornamentation.

== Clergy ==
The following individuals have served as vicars of St Andrew's Brighton:

Order	Name	Date installed	Term ended	Term of office	Comments	Notes
1	Adam Compton Thomson	1842	1848	5–6 years		
2	William Brickwood	1849	1853	3–4 years		
3	Samuel Taylor	1853	1889	35–36 years		
4	William Chalmers	1889	1892	2–3 years	later Bishop of Goulburn, New South Wales	
5	John "Jack" Stretch	1892	1894	1–2 years	later Bishop of Newcastle, New South Wales	
6	Reginald Stephen	1894	1899	4–5 years	later Bishop of Tasmania and then Bishop of Newcastle	
7	Edward Crawford	1899	1913	13–14 years		
8	Archibald Law	1913	1917	3–4 years	later vicar of St John's Church, Toorak, Melbourne	
9	William Hancock	1918	1928	9–10 years	later Archdeacon of Melbourne	
10	Harold Hewett	1928	1948	19–20 years		
11	Donald Redding MBE	1949	1951	1–2 years	later Bishop of Bunbury and Coadjutor Bishop of Melbourne	
12	George "Bill" Codrington	1952	1965	12–13 years		
13	Ross Border	1966	1969	2–3 years		
14	David Shand	1969	1973	3–4 years	later Bishop of St Arnaud, Victoria	
15	Don Hardy	1974	1979	4–5 years		
16	Harlin Butterley	1980	1993	12–13 years	formerly Dean of St David's Cathedral, Hobart, Tasmania	
17	Ken Hewlett	1993	2003	9–10 years	formerly Dean of Bathurst Cathedral, New South Wales	
18	Kenyon McKie	2004	2011	6–7 years	formerly Dean of Goulburn Cathedral, New South Wales	
19	Jan Joustra	2012	2019	6–7 years	formerly Dean of St Peter's Cathedral, Hamilton, New Zealand	
20	Ian Morrison	2019	incumbent	6–7 years	formerly Archdeacon of Box Hill and & Parish Priest of Holy Trinity Anglican Church Surrey Hills	

== Music at St Andrew's ==
St Andrew's Brighton has the longest continual musical tradition of any institution in Victoria and the choir is Victoria's oldest choir. The church had the first locally built pipe organ in the Port Phillip District; the instrument was opened in 1843 in the first church building and was built by Peter Hurlstone, the first organist. Since then, many of Australia's leading musicians have held the positions of organist and Director of Music at St Andrew's Brighton. The current organist, since 2019, is Dr Calvin Bowman; and the current musical director, since 2025, is Dr Mario Dobernig.

=== Pipe organs ===
Since 1843, there have been five pipe organs installed in the four St Andrew's church buildings, and one instrument installed in the St Andrew's School House building between 1876 and 1879.

1843: Peter Hurlstone, Melbourne

In 1843, the first pipe organ in the earliest St Andrew's building was the first locally-built pipe organ in the Port Phillip District and only the third pipe organ to be heard in a public building in south-eastern mainland Australia. Built by Peter Hurlstone, the first organist of the church, who had also assembled the District's earlier two pipe organs in the previous year. The Hurlstone instrument was moved to the second church building in 1850 and repaired in 1855 by Henry Smith, from the Bristol firm of John Smith & Sons, resident in Melbourne at the time. In 1855 and 1856, the instrument was again repaired and also enlarged by English immigrant organ builder Jesse Biggs. It is almost certain that this instrument survives, in its enlarged form, in St Luke's Lutheran Church, Cavendish.

1857: Jesse Biggs, Melbourne

In 1857, the Hurlstone instrument, originally from 1843 and recently relocated to the third church building, was sold. The funds generated from this sale were used to acquire a new instrument crafted by Jesse Biggs in the same year. On Monday 23 November 1857, The Age reported ‘Organ Performance. On Wednesday last [18 November 1857] Mr W.B. Wray, late organist of the Blind Asylum, Liverpool, gave a selection of music by the great composers on the new instrument just finished by Mr Biggs, at his manufactory, in Little Lonsdale street, west. Several of our musical connoisseurs were present by invitation and expressed themselves highly delighted with the power and tone of the organ, as well as with the masterly performance of the organist. The instrument reflects the highest credit on the builder, and we must congratulate the good people of Brighton on becoming its possessors. Mr Wray, we believe, was induced to come to this colony for the benefit of his health, and we sincerely hope he may be induced to remain. An organist and teacher of his reputation would be an immense acquisition to this metropolis, particularly as our churches are now becoming fitted with organs of magnitude and first rate quality.’

1860: Hill & Son, London

In 1860, the 1857 Biggs instrument was sold and a chamber organ, built by the leading London organ building firm of Hill & Son for a local residence in 1858, was purchased following an auction of the first owner's property. Placed originally in a gallery at the west end of the church, surviving today as the west end of the Pioneer Chapel, the Hill & Son organ was moved to a new organ chamber in the new chancel in 1886. The instrument was too small for the enlarged building and, although other instruments were considered over the following decades, it was not until 1918 that it was finally an ‘urgent necessity’ the Hill & Son instrument be replaced. The opportunity was taken to dedicate the planned new instrument as a memorial to parishioners from St Andrew's who had died in the First World War. The Hill & Son organ survives, in basically original condition, in St Peter's Lutheran Church, Stawell.

1923: W.L. Roberts, Melbourne and Adelaide

Although a contract was signed with the leading Australian organ building firm of J. E. Dodd for a large three-manual organ in July 1920, this contract was cancelled by St Andrew's in October 1922 after a significant delay in the planned building of the instrument. In January 1923, the contract was signed for a new Memorial Organ with the Australian organ building firm of William Leopold Roberts. This large three-manual instrument was dedicated in 1924 and designed by the Organist of St Andrew's: George L. Talbot, who acted as Consultant for the project. It was placed in matching divided cases of Tasmanian oak, designed by architect Louis R. Williams, on either side of the large south transept window. The organ console was placed in the former organ chamber to the south side of the chancel.

The instrument was of note as one of the largest instruments built by W.L. Roberts. The wooden pipework was locally manufactured, but the metal pipework was imported from the UK: the reed stops from Proctors of Leeds, and all the metal flue stops from Rogers of Leeds. Roberts had trained with J.J. Binns of Leeds and was familiar with the high-quality work of these trade pipework suppliers. The instrument had tubular-pneumatic key, coupler and stop action together with a full manual key compass of 61 notes and a full pedal key compass of 32 notes.

After nearly four decades of regular use, this instrument was completely destroyed in the fire of 19 February 1961.

Specification of the 1923 Memorial Organ (W.L. Roberts, Ltd: 1923)

I Choir (enclosed)
Claribel Flute	8
Viole d’Orchestre (+)	8
Dulciana	8
Suabe Flute	4
Clarinet (+)	8
Orchestral Oboe	8
Vox Humana	8
Tremulant
Tromba* (a)	8
Choir Sub Octave
Choir Unison Off
Choir Octave
Swell to Choir

II Great
Bourdon (b)	16
Open Diapason (Large)	8
Open Diapason (Small)	8
Hohl Flute	8
Octave	4
Harmonic Flute	4
Fifteenth	2
Mixture (+)	III
Tromba* (a)	8
Swell to Great
Choir to Great

III Swell (enclosed)
Lieblich Bourdon	16
Open Diapason	8
Rohr Flute	8
Viole d’Gamba	8
Viole Celestes GG	8
Gemshorn	4
Lieblich Flute (+)	4
Mixture	III
Contra Fagotto* (+)	16
Cornopean*	8
Oboe	8
Clarion*	4
Tremulant
Swell Sub Octave
Swell Octave

Pedal
Acoustic Bass (c)	32
Open Diapason (Wood)	16
Sub Bass (c)	16
Bourdon (b)	16
Bass Flute (c)	8
Trombone* (a) (+)	16
Pedal Octave
Choir to Pedal
Great to Pedal
Swell to Pedal

Accessories

5 Swell thumb pistons (1 adj.)
4 Great thumb pistons (1 adj.)
3 Choir thumb pistons (1 adj.)
4 Swell toe pistons
4 Great toe pistons
Great to Pedal toe reversible
Full Organ toe reversible
Balanced Swell Pedal
Balanced Choir Pedal

Wind pressures

Great heavy* wind: 8”
Great light wind: 4”
Swell heavy* wind: 8”
Swell light wind: 5”
Choir: 3 1/2”
Pedal: 6”
Prepared for only (+)

==== War Memorial Grand Organ ====
1962-64: Davis & Laurie, Melbourne

Following the fire in February 1961 which destroyed the third church building and previous Memorial Organ, the new four-manual War Memorial Grand Organ, designed by the Organist of St Andrew's: Ian L. Thomas, was dedicated on Easter Day 1964 in the newly rebuilt ‘Cathedral of Light’. It has been played almost daily ever since for services, concerts, weddings, funerals, lessons and recordings.

Australian-made between 1962 and 1964 by the Melbourne firm of Davis & Laurie, the instrument is a memorial to Australians killed in the 20th century's two World Wars. There are nearly 3,000 pipes and 64 speaking stops speaking into "one of the most beautiful acoustics in Australia." As one of Australasia's landmark musical instruments, the War Memorial Grand Organ's opening garnered significant attention and drew positive reviews both around Australasia and internationally.

The organ is one of very few in the world with twin four-manual consoles. It also has a full-length 32’ wooden reed: the ‘Contra Bombarde’. Contemporaneous with the large locally-built instrument in St Patrick's Cathedral, Melbourne opened three months after the War Memorial Grand Organ, the instrument was the first in Australasia to have a horizontal reed stop ‘en chamade’ – the ‘Festal Trumpet’. The Gallery and Transept divisions are over 100 feet apart, giving inspirational ‘stereo’ antiphonal effects.

Specification of the War Memorial Grand Organ (Davis & Laurie: 1962–64)

I Choir (enclosed)
Wald Flute	8
Dulciana	8
Viola da Gamba	8
Larigot Flute	4
Salicet	4
Stopt Twelfth	2 2/3
Piccolo	2
Flute Tierce	1 3/5
Flageolet	1
Clarinet	8
Tremulant
Trumpet	8
Festal Trumpet	8
Festal Clarion	4
Swell to Choir
Transept to Choir

II Great
Contra Salicional	16
Open Diapason I	8
Open Diapason II	8
Stopt Diapason	8
Principal	4
Harmonic Flute	4
Fifteenth	2
Tierce	1 3/5
Quartane	II
Mixture	IV
Trumpet	8
Clarion	4
Swell to Great
Choir to Great
Transept to Great

III Swell (enclosed)
Bourdon	16
Open Diapason	8
Gedeckt	8
Salicional	8
Vox Angelica TC	8
Principal	4
Chimney Flute	4
Fifteenth	2
Mixture	III
Hautboy	8
Super Octave
Tremulant
Double Trumpet	16
Trumpet	8
Octave Trumpet	4
Transept to Swell

IV Transept
Open Diapason	8
Stopt Flute	8
Gemshorn	8
Octave	4
Stopt Flute	4
Gemshorn	4
Super Octave	2
Mixture	III
Sharp Mixture	II

Pedal
Sub Bourdon	32
Open Wood	16
Open Metal	16
Bourdon	16
Contra Salicional	16
Principal	8
Flute	8
Fifteenth	4
Quartane	II
Contra Bombarde	32
Bombarde	16
Double Trumpet	16
Trumpet	8
Clarion	4
Choir to Pedal
Great to Pedal
Swell to Pedal
Transept to Pedal

Transept Pedal
Bourdon	16
Flute	8
Flute	4

Accessories

4 Transept thumb pistons
6 Swell thumb pistons
6 Great thumb pistons
6 Choir thumb pistons
4 General thumb pistons
6 Swell toe pistons
6 Pedal toe pistons
Transept to Pedal thumb reversible
Swell to Pedal thumb reversible
Great to Pedal thumb reversible
Choir to Pedal thumb reversible
Swell to Great thumb reversible
Great to Pedal toe reversible
Swell to Great toe reversible
Contra Bombarde 32 toe reversible
Great and Pedal Pistons Coupled
Transept to Great Pistons
Balanced Swell Pedal
Balanced Choir Pedal

Electro-pneumatic and electro-mechanical key, coupler and stop action. Compass: 61/32. 64 levels of adjustable General and Divisional memory.

== See also ==
- Architecture of Melbourne
- List of Anglican churches in Melbourne
- List of places on the Victorian Heritage Register in the City of Bayside
