= Dingley =

Dingley may refer to:

== Places ==
- Dingley, Northamptonshire, England
- Dingley, Missouri, United States
- Dingley Island, Maine, United States
- Dingley Village, Victoria, Australia
- Stanford Dingley, a village in Berkshire, England
- Dingley Hall, a hotel on Sodor (fictional island)

== Other uses ==
- Dingley (surname)
- The Dingleys, an early South African television family drama

== See also ==
- Dingley Act (shipping), an 1884 merchant marine law in the United States
- Dingley Act, an 1897 tariff law in the United States
- Frank L. Dingley House, an historic house in Auburn, Maine
