= Stephen Hale (bishop) =

Australian Anglican bishop (born 1955)

The Right Reverend Stephen Hale
- Assistant bishop (Eastern Region), Anglican Diocese of Melbourne
- Church: Anglican Church of Australia
- Diocese: Melbourne
- In office: 2001–2009

Orders
- Consecration: 2001 by Peter Watson

Personal details
- Born: Stephen J. Hale; 26 June 1955 (age 71) Sydney, New South Wales, Australia
- Denomination: Anglican
- Spouse: Karen Hale (m. 1986)
- Children: 2
- Education: Sydney University; Moore Theological College

Stephen J. Hale (born 26 June 1955) is a retired Australian Anglican bishop. As an assistant bishop in the Anglican Diocese of Melbourne, he was Bishop for the Eastern Region from 2001 to 2009 with oversight of over 70 churches in the east of Melbourne.

Hale grew up in Sydney. He studied at Sydney University then taught at Leeton, New South Wales, for four years. Returning to Sydney, Hale studied at Moore Theological College and his first position was at St Paul's Anglican Church, Castle Hill. While there, St Paul's became the biggest Anglican church in Australia.

In 1988, Hale was invited to Melbourne by Archbishop David Penman to head up a new youth department where he served for eight years. He later became Vicar at Diamond Creek, then Archdeacon of Box Hill, before becoming Bishop of the Eastern Region in the Diocese of Melbourne in 2001. Hale also chaired Access Ministries and Christian leadership organisation Arrow International.

In 2009, Hale was appointed as Vicar of what is now the St Hilary's Anglican Network, the combined parishes of St Hilary's Anglican Church, Kew St Silas Anglican Church, Balwyn and St Augustine’s Anglican Church, Mont Albert North. He retired in January 2020.
