= All Saints Anglican Church, Mitcham =

Anglican church in Melbourne, Victoria, Australia

All Saints' Anglican Church
- Location of the church in Greater Metropolitan Melbourne
- All Saints' Anglican Church
- 37°48′57″S 145°11′29″E
- Location: 18 Edward St, Mitcham, Melbourne, Victoria
- Country: Australia
- Denomination: Anglican
- Website: allsaintsmitcham.org.au

History
- Status: Open
- Dedication: All Saints

Architecture
- Functional status: Church
- Architect: Raymond Berg
- Architectural type: Church
- Style: Modernism
- Completed: 1958

Specifications
- Materials: Steel; redbrick; concrete tiles; timber

Administration
- Diocese: Anglican Diocese of Melbourne
- Parish: All Saints' Mitcham

Clergy
- Pastors: Rev. Greg Wong; Rev'd Dr Andrew Reid; Kevin Xu; Heather Reid

History
- Built by: Anderson Construction Company

Victorian Heritage Register
- Official name: All Saints (Former Christ Church) Anglican Church
- Type: Registered place
- Designated: 8 August 2012
- Reference no.: H2302
- Heritage overlay no.: HO96
- Category: Religion

The All Saints' Anglican Church is an Anglican church, located in Mitcham, an eastern suburb of Melbourne, Victoria, Australia.

Located on the traditional lands of the Wurundjeri, the church was added to the Victorian Heritage Register on 8 August 2012 in recognition of its architectural and historical significance.

== Description ==
The first church built on this site was a timber church building, completed in 1888.

In 1958 a new church was built on the adjacent site and the timber building was repurposed as the parish hall and both buildings remain on the site. The 1958 church building was designed by Raymond Berg and is one of his few remaining works. The church was constructed by Anderson Construction Company.

Completed in an early Modernist style, the steel and redbrick building is in a simple rectangular form with shallow butterfly roof. The side walls are clad with grey concrete tiles. Strips of clerestory windows line the side walls between the exposed steel. The northern clerestory windows and timber frames were replaced in 2020 and the southern clerestory windows and timber frames were replaced in 2024. An ancillary rectangular space to the north-west contains a chapel, vestry and choir room, and another to the south-east contains the original entry porch. A tall open steel framed tower, supporting a cross, is situated in front of the porch. Internally the nave and sanctuary are one space with the steel structure exposed. Additional steel columns flank the side aisles, strapped plywood dados line the side walls, and the ceiling is lined with timber.

The building retains stained timber furniture, including a pulpit, lectern and two-toned pews, a marble altar and cylindrical acrylic light fittings.

Additions to the property in 2011 include an enclosed link which abuts the north side of the 1958 church and the rear of the 1888 church, and connects these with a new hall and existing church house. The form of the two church buildings remains clearly evident.

The church and its parish are part of the Anglican Diocese of Melbourne.

== See also ==
- List of Anglican churches in Melbourne
- All Saints' Day
