= David Taylor Kellock =

Australian glass artist (1913–1988)

- Born: 19 January 1913; Dunfermline, Scotland
- Died: 6 June 1988 (aged 75); Berwick, Australia

David Taylor Kellock (19 January 1913 – 6 June 1988) was a Scottish Australian stained glass artist, active from the late 1940s until the 1970s.

== Life and career ==
Kellock studied at the School of Art College in Edinburgh and worked at the Victoria and Albert Museum, London, before coming to Australia in the 1930s.

Kellock was an instructor in the Art Department at the Hobart Technical College and examiner in history of architecture for the RAIA in Tasmania from 1939 to 1941. He was in charge of the art school at Geelong Grammar School and moved to Ballarat in 1946, where he began his stained glass business and was also art teacher at the Ballarat School of Mines.

== Artistic philosophy ==
In 1946, Kellock wrote "Appreciation is not a mere matter of caprice; we must not be satisfied by 'This pleases me, That does not' ... We may learn to feel more widely and to ... find pleasure in qualities which at first were not apparent. Even as artists we should understand and practise appreciation, for a sympathy with others is of value in completing and enriching our own work. We are not only artists, we are also human beings ... Unless art is of some use to humanity and makes life better and richer, humanity will pass it by ... Under all forms of art, there lies a common principle. The human mind is capable of ... a scientific or intellectual form ... an emotional or imaginative form ... It is this touch of emotion and imagination which is the essence of art."

== Commissions ==
He provided ten windows for Saint Peter's Anglican Church in Ballarat.

Kellock also made a World War II memorial window for St Augustine's, in the City of Merri-bek, and Littlejohn Memorial Chapel in Scotch College, Melbourne.

Kellock designed all the windows for the Memorial chapel at Flinders Naval Depot in Victoria, a building designed by Louis Williams.
