= Maurice Betteridge =

New Zealander church historian (1927–2020)

Maurice Stanley Betteridge (19 February 1927 – 25 May 2020) was a church historian who served as Principal of Ridley College in Melbourne from 1979 to 1992.

Betteridge was born in New Zealand, and obtained MA and BD degrees from the University of New Zealand. He was ordained into the Anglican ministry by Percival Stephenson, and was greatly influenced by William Orange. Betteridge served as minister of St. Matthew's Church, Dunedin before being awarded a Fulbright scholarship to study at General Theological Seminary in New York City, where he obtained an STM degree.

Betteridge moved to Australia and served as the Federal Secretary of the Australian Church Mission Society from 1973 to 1978, as well as lecturing at the University of New England.

Betteridge was principal of Ridley College (Melbourne) from 1 June 1979 to 1992 after Leon Morris.
