= Peter Corney (pastor) =

Australian Anglican pastor (born 1942)

The Venerable Peter Corney OAM
- Church: Anglican Church of Australia
- Diocese: Melbourne

Orders
- Ordination: 1966 by Frank Woods

Personal details
- Born: Peter James Corney; 25 September 1937 (age 88) Perth, Western Australia, Australia
- Denomination: Anglicanism
- Spouse: Merrill Corney
- Children: 3
- Education: Guildford Grammar School
- Alma mater: Ridley College; Australian College of Theology; Melbourne College of Divinity

Peter James Corney OAM (born 25 September 1937) is an Australian retired Anglican theologian and pastor who was the vicar of St Hilary's Anglican Church in Kew from 1975 to 1999.

Corney was born in Perth, Western Australia, in 1937. He studied at Guildford Grammar School, matriculating in 1959. From 1960 to 1963, he studied at Ridley College in Melbourne. He later went on to study for a graduate degree in theology with the Australian College of Theology and the Melbourne College of Divinity.

During this time, Corney worked for the Anglican Diocese of Melbourne as an assistant curate and later youth chaplain from 1966 to 1973. In the late 1960s and early 1970s, Corney pioneered a new youth ministry program which saw him work in contemporary Christian worship in counter-cultural forms. This was all innovated at the Royal Melbourne Institute of Technology (RMIT) and at Ridley College.

In 1974, the Anglican parish of St Hilary's in Kew invited him to become their sixth vicar. He commenced in this ministry position in early 1975; a position he held until the end of 1999. During Corney's 24 years at St Hilary's, he spearheaded new ways of ministry that were relatively modern. This came in the form of a more contemporary evangelical outreach, with social justice and a large youth and young adults program. Within a decade of being vicar, he had turned around an ailing local parish, to later become the largest Anglican congregation in the Melbourne diocese with over 1,000 parishioners every Sunday at worship. Corney stepped down from the position of vicar in 1999. He would continue much of his intellectual and social justice work.

Outside of St Hilary's, Corney researched and lectured at his former alma mater, Ridley College as well as authoring many books and other Christian commentaries on issues occurring throughout the world.

== Honours ==
For the 2007 Australia Day Honours, Corney was conferred the Medal of the Order of Australia (OAM) "For service to the Anglican Church of Australia, particularly through the development of creative programs to meet contemporary community needs".

In recognition of Corney's ministry at St Hilary's, the parish named one of their buildings the Peter Corney Training Centre after him and also honoured him with the honorific title of Vicar Emeritus for the remainder of his life.
