= Berg and Alexandra =

Berg and Alexandra was an Australian architecture firm from 1962 to 1996, based in Chelsea House, on Flemington Road in North Melbourne. The firm was formed by a partnership between two Melbourne architects Raymond Berg, born in 1913 in South Melbourne, and Douglas Alexandra, born in 1922 in Shepparton, Victoria. Berg retired in 1983 and died five years later, with Alexandra retiring in 1996 and selling the practice to Hudson and Wardrop. Berg and Alexandra were among the first post-war Australian architects to produce modernist works. They were heralded for their simple, stripped back designs that broke away from ‘the old familiar features’ of Australian Architecture.

== Personal life ==
Raymond Berg, born Raymond Schmerberg, was educated at the Brunswick Technical College and later studied a Bachelor of Architecture at the University of Melbourne. He graduated and earned a position in the office of Leighton Irwin, where he remained until 1941. In November 1942, Berg enlisted with the RAAF and was discharged with the rank of flying officer in 1946. In 1949 berg was offered a position as a senior lecturer at the University of Melbourne. During this time Berg undertook very few commissions, designing two residences, a medical clinic in Mitcham (1955) and a Christ Church also in Mitcham (1958). Berg briefly entered into a partnership with Hub Waugh, whom he had worked with in the office of Leighton Irwin, and together they designed a house, based on a triangular plan, in Clayton. The majority of his projects have since been demolished including Berg's own house in Kew. In 1962 Berg entered into practice with fellow University lecturer Douglas Alexandra.

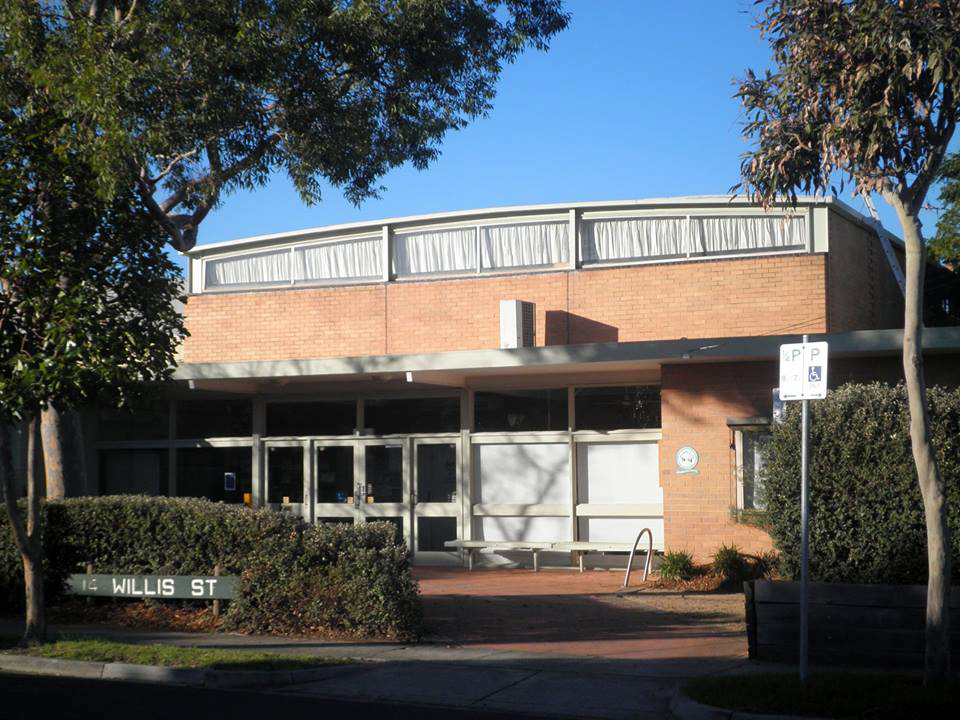
Public Hall designed by Raymond & Berg for the Sandringham City Council in 1967. Now the Hampton Community Centre.

Douglas Alexandra, born Diomedes Alexandratos, graduated from Caulfield Grammar in 1940 and worked in drafting and land surveying offices until December 1942 when he joined the RAAF. His plane was shot down during a Lancaster mission and he was incarcerated for one year in the German war camp Stalag Luft III. Discharged from the RAAF in 1946, he began a Bachelor of Architecture at the University of Melbourne. After graduating Alexandra opened his own firm and soon established himself as one of ‘Melbourne’s first post-war modernist architects’. Alexandra designed a series of residences and two kindergartens, one in Beaumaris (1956) and one in Burwood (1957), as well as a regional art gallery and library complex in Hamilton, Victoria. During the 1950s Alexandra lectured in design at the University of Melbourne, alongside Raymond Berg, before the two went into practice together in 1962.

== Notable Projects ==
Berg and Alexandra designed several notable projects in regional Victoria and Melbourne, along with their sleek residential designs they were well known for designing modern civic buildings that exposed the broader public to the bare stripped back principles of modern architecture. The Nunawading Civic Centre, the Mildura Arts Centre and the Hampton Community Centre were all major public projects that were heavily used by their communities, exposing people to the modern aesthetic. The Portland Cultural Centre was never constructed to their design, however their drawings generated the community interest that helped to generate the funds and support that lead to the projects completion. As senior lecturers for the University of Melbourne they had the opportunity to collaborate on several projects with Melbourne University's head architect Rae Featherstone. Through this relationship they assisted in the design of the Raymond Priestly Building and helped to complete works on South Quadrangle. A complete list of all projects completed by Berg and Alexander below:

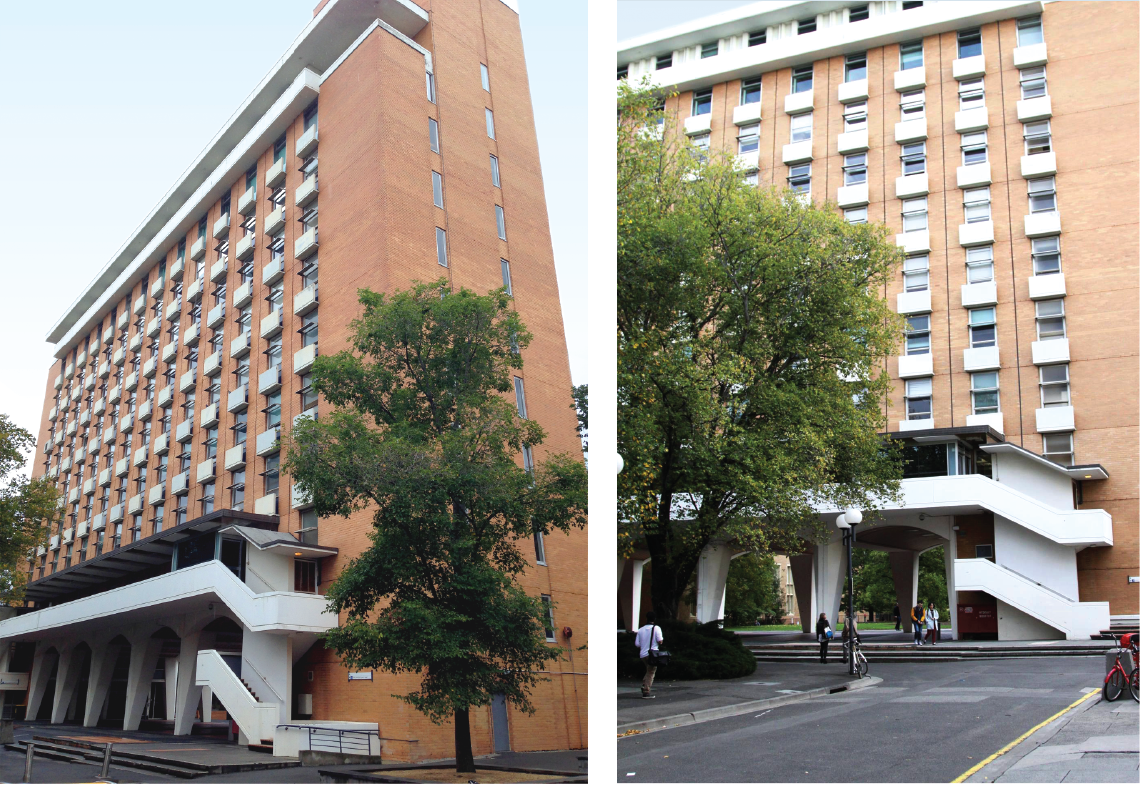
The Raymond Priestly building, located in the University of Melbourne's Parkville campus. Designed by Raymond & Berg in collaboration with Rae Featherstone, 1970.

• Shepparton Civic Centre, 90 Welsford Street, Shepparton (1961–65)

• Residence, 4 Sythney Court, Surrey Hills (1961)

• Residence, 5 Lydia Court, Balwyn (1962)

• Portland Cultural Centre, Portland (1965)

• Nunawading Civic Centre, Whitehorse Road, Nunawading (1965)

• Mildura Arts Centre, Cureton Avenue, Mildura (1966)

• Public Hall for the City of Sandringham, Willis Street, Hampton (1967)

• Residence, 64 Richards Road, Croydon North (1967)

• Raymond Priestly Building, University of Melbourne, Parkville (1967-1970)

• Arts and Crafts Centre, East Ivanhoe Primary School (1968)

• Dowell Court, 159 Lwr Heidelberg Road, Ivanhoe (1968)

• Completion of South Quadrangle, University of Melbourne (1970)

== Awards ==
While studying at the University of Melbourne Raymond Berg won the Perrott Prize for Architectural Rendering (1934) and the Grice Bronze Medal for Design (1935). In later years, while partner of Berg and Alexandra, he was awarded the Australian Institute of Architects Gold Medal in 1973.
