= Brian Rosner =

Australian theologian (born 1959)

The Reverend Brian Rosner
- Born: Brian Steven Rosner; 17 June 1959 (age 67); Western Sydney, Australia
- Occupations: Academic; theologian

Academic background
- Education: University of Sydney; Dallas Theological Seminary; University of Cambridge

Academic work
- Discipline: Biblical studies
- Sub-discipline: New Testament and Pauline Theological studies
- Institutions: University of Aberdeen; Moore Theological College; Ridley College

Brian Steven Rosner (born 17 June 1959) is an Australian theologian and academic who was the Principal of Ridley College (Melbourne) between 2012 and 2024. He has authored many books including Known by God: A Biblical Theology of Personal Identity amongst others.

Rosner grew up in Western Sydney to an Austrian-Jewish father and to an Australian mother in the 1960s. Between 1978 and 1981, he completed a Bachelor of Arts at the University of Sydney. From there, Rosner studied at the Dallas Theological Seminary in the United States, where he focused on ancient literature. After this period in the mid 1980s, he completed his education at the University of Cambridge, culminating in a PhD of divinity in 1991.

Rosner began his career at the University of Aberdeen as a lecturer in New Testament studies between 1991 and 1999. However, he later returned to Australia, with the Macquarie University as a senior lecturer in Biblical studies for a number of years. Rosner then began work at the Moore Theological College in Sydney between 2003 and 2012.

In July 2012, the Anglican Archbishop of Melbourne, Philip Freier appointed him to be the Principal of Ridley College, who also ordained him as a deacon. Since moving to Melbourne, Rosner has written various books and articles which have featured in The Age and The Australian newspapers which have discussed the Christian faith in modern, secular times.

== Selected works ==
Rosner has completed a variety of works over the past few decades that include:

=== Books ===
- Strengthened by the Gospel: A Theology of Romans (2025) ISBN 9781433572555
- Rosner, Brian (17 May 2022). How to Find Yourself: Why Looking Inward Is Not the Answer. Crossway. ISBN 978-1-4335-7815-1.
- ——— (12 September 2017). Known by God: A Biblical Theology of Personal Identity. Zondervan. ISBN 9780310499824.
- ——— (17 November 2015). Mending a Fractured Church: How to Seek Unity with Integrity. Lexham Press. ISBN 978-1577996866.
- ——— (19 August 2013). Paul and the Law: Keeping the Commandments of God: 31. InterVarsity Press. ISBN 978-1844748914.
- ——— (21 September 2007). Greed as Idolatry: The Origin and Meaning of a Pauline Metaphor. Eardmans. ISBN 9781467426350.
- ——— (15 October 1999). How to Get Really Rich: A Sharp Look at the Religion of Greed. InterVarsity Press. ISBN 0851116493.
- ——— (1 January 1999). Paul, Scripture, and Ethics: A Study of 1 Corinthians 5-7. InterVarsity Press. ISBN 9789004332751.
