= Raymond Berg =

Australian architect

Raymond Berg AM (25 October 1913 – 1989), born Raymond Schmerberg, was an Australian architect who received several awards, including the 1973 Gold Medal by the Australian Institute of Architects.

== Biography ==
He was educated at the Brunswick Technical College and later studied a Bachelor of Architecture at the University of Melbourne. He graduated and earned a position in the office of Leighton Irwin, where he remained until 1941. In November 1942, Berg enlisted with the RAAF and was discharged with the rank of flying officer in 1946. In 1949 berg was offered a position as a senior lecturer at the University of Melbourne. During this time Berg undertook very few commissions, designing two residences, a medical clinic in Mitcham (1955) and the former Christ Church, now Anglican church, also in Mitcham (1958). Berg briefly entered into a partnership with Hub Waugh, whom he had worked with in the office of Leighton Irwin, and together they designed a house, based on a triangular plan, in Clayton. Unfortunately the majority of his projects have since been demolished including Berg's own house in Kew. In 1962 Berg entered into practice with fellow University lecturer Douglas Alexandra, known as Berg and Alexandra.

== Awards ==
While studying at the University of Melbourne Raymond Berg won the Perrott Prize for Architectural Rendering (1934) and the Grice Bronze Medal for Design (1935). In later years, while partner of Berg and Alexandra, he was awarded the Australian Institute of Architects Gold Medal in 1973. In 1983 he was appointed as a Member of the Order of Australia for "service to architecture".
