= Rhys Bezzant =

Australian Anglican priest and church historian

Rhys Stewart Bezzant FRHS is an Australian Anglican priest and church historian. He has been principal of Ridley College in Melbourne since 2025.

Bezzant studied at the University of Melbourne, the University of Cologne, and Ridley College. He was ordained a priest in the Anglican Diocese of Melbourne in 1997.

Bezzant specialises in the work of Jonathan Edwards and has written Edwards the Mentor (Oxford University Press, 2019) and Edwards, Germany, and Transatlantic Contexts (Vandenhoeck & Ruprecht, 2021). He is director of the Jonathan Edwards Center of Australia.

Bezzant has also translated Volker Leppin's Francis of Assisi into English (Yale University Press, 2025). He became a Fellow of the Royal Historical Society in 2022.
