= Dingley, Missouri =

Ghost town in Missouri, United States

Coordinates: 38.3011567°N 91.6807193°W

Dingley is an extinct town in Osage County, in the U.S. state of Missouri.

A post office called Dingley was established in 1907, and remained in operation until 1909. Besides the post office, the community had a schoolhouse. The schoolhouse was named after Edward Dingley, the original owner of the site.
