= Dingley (surname) =

Dingley is an English surname. Notable people with the surname include:

- Bert Dingley (1885–1966), American racecar driver
- Joan Dingley (1916–2008), New Zealand scientist, expert in the study of fungus
- Nelson Dingley Jr. (1832–1899), American journalist and politician from Maine
- Robert Dingley (died 1395), MP for Wiltshire
- Robert Dingley (died 1456), MP for Hampshire
- Robert Dingley (FRS) (baptised 1710–1781), merchant, banker and philanthropist
- Robert Dingley (Roundhead) (1619–1660), puritan
- Sir Thomas Dingley (died 1539), Catholic martyr executed for treason by Henry VIII
- Thomas Dingley (antiquary) (died 1695), also spelled Dineley, English antiquary
- Razzle (musician), Nicholas Dingley, (1960–1984) drummer of Hanoi Rocks
