= Ridley College (Melbourne) =

Christian theological college in Melbourne, Australia

Coordinates: 37°47′2″S 144°57′27″E

- Type: Private, Christian
- Established: 1910
- President: Philip Freier
- Principal: Rhys Bezzant
- Students: 400+
- Location: Melbourne, Australia
- Campus: Parkville, Victoria
- Website: ridley.edu.au

Ridley College, briefly also known as Ridley Melbourne, is a Christian theological college in the parklands of central Melbourne in the Australian state of Victoria. Established in 1910, it has an evangelical foundation and outlook and is affiliated with the Australian University of Theology and the Anglican Church of Australia. The college offers on-campus and online learning and provides training for various Christian ministries in a range of contexts.

== History ==
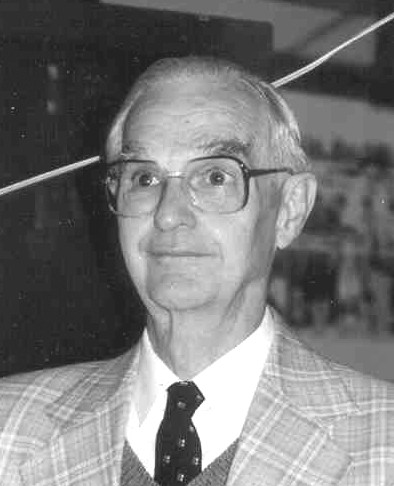
Leon Morris

Named after a 16th-century English Reformation martyr, Nicholas Ridley, Ridley College was established on 1 March 1910 to provide residential theological training. Its founders were evangelical Anglican clergy and laypeople from throughout Victoria. Ridley College's principals have included the prominent New Testament scholar Leon Morris (1914–2006; principal 1964–1979), known for his studies of the atonement.

For much of its history, a main feature of Ridley College was its residential college, with students accommodated mainly in the Aiken and Baker buildings. Like other residential colleges in the area, it provided its students with a range of academic, social and religious programs. From 1965 to 2005, Ridley was an affiliated residential college of the University of Melbourne and, in 1972, it became the first of the university's colleges open to both men and women. In 2005, the residential college was closed due to rising costs. The following year, it was reopened to provide accommodation specifically for international students from the surrounding universities, the University of Melbourne, RMIT University and Monash University. The residential college was again closed at the end of 2007. Ridley College retains a small residential theological community in the renamed Baker building (formerly Bearham).

The buildings were substantially upgraded in 2019.

== Principals ==
The principals of Ridley College have been:

Period served	Name
1910–1917	George Aicken
1918–1938	Eustace Wade
1938–1952	Donald Baker
1953–1963	Stuart Babbage
1964–1979	Leon Morris
1979–1992	Maurice Betteridge
1992–2001	Graham Cole
2002–2012	Peter Adam
2012–2024	Brian Rosner
2025–present	Rhys Bezzant

== Education and training ==
Ridley College aims to provide Christian theological formation with a balance across three domains: ministry practice, Christian thought (theology and ethics) and biblical studies (including Greek and Hebrew languages). While the college teaches from an evangelical theological perspective, it is open to Christians of all backgrounds. Its stated aims are to equip its students for Christian ministries in a variety of settings, including a range of church denominations and cross-cultural contexts. The college actively supports parachurch work as well as ordained and local church roles. Along with Trinity College Theological School, Ridley also trains ordinands for ministry in the Anglican Diocese of Melbourne and other Anglican dioceses.

Leon Morris Library

Ridley's academic resources include its library and bookshop. The Leon Morris Library has a collection of 46,000 volumes and 150 journal subscriptions and contains significant resources on biblical studies. The

Ridley College is a government-recognised tertiary institution and a CRICOS provider, offering education to international students. This means that domestic students have access to government support for tuition fees. The college offers undergraduate, graduate and postgraduate programs and courses from the Australian College of Theology, the education provider for 20 Christian colleges in Australia. Its programs include the Master of Divinity, the Graduate Diploma of Divinity and the Bachelor of Theology.

There have been a number of developments in recent years at the college. In 2008, Ridley College completed a new vision for development and began restructuring its education around six learning communities. These include the college's distance learning program, eRidley, which was established in 2007. eRidley – renamed Ridley Online in 2014 – is particularly designed to provide training for Australians in remote areas, in collaboration with the Bush Church Aid Society. In June 2008, Ridley College sold the southern half of its property to residential developers, including the Aickin, Baker, Cumnock and Larcombe buildings and the octagonal chapel designed by James Stahle. The Bearham building was subsequently renamed Baker to preserve naming according to the college's principals. In May 2009, Ridley announced the establishment of a Jonathan Edwards Centre affiliated with the Jonathan Edwards Center at Yale University. Kenneth Minkema, executive director of the Jonathan Edwards Center, commented, "The establishment of the Jonathan Edwards Center–Australia at Ridley is a significant expansion of Edwards scholarship and will serve widely both academia and the church."

== Campus and community ==
Main quadrangle, facing Stanway (left) and dining room (right)

Ridley College is located in Parkville, a residential parkland suburb roughly three kilometres from the centre of Melbourne. The campus is situated between Royal Park to the west and Princes Park to the east. The campus buildings surround two main courtyards and are used as follows:

- Adam — lecture room
- Babbage — lecture room
- Baker — faculty offices; residential theological apartments
- College lounge — recreational student space
- Dining room — with adjacent kitchen and Betteridge lecture room
- Leon Morris Library — with adjacent lecture and meeting rooms
- Stanway — classroom
- Wade — reception, staff offices

The college is used by St Jude's Church, Carlton, for two of its Sunday services.

== Notable faculty ==
- Michael Bird – deputy principal, academic
- John Dickson – distinguished fellow and senior lecturer in public Christianity
- Peter Corney – former lecturer and researcher
- Brian Rosner – former principal

== Photo gallery ==
Main entrance

Baker building

Dining room

Main quadrangle, facing Stanway (left) and dining room (right)

Stanway A classroom

Leon Morris Library

Leon Morris Library loft

Lounge, student recreation block, Baker

== See also ==
- St Jude's Church, Carlton
- Melbourne School of Theology
- Presbyterian Theological College
- Moore Theological College
- Ridley College, Ontario, Canada
- Ridley Hall, Cambridge
