= Banksia Peninsula =

Peninsula in Victoria, Australia

Banksia Peninsula is a peninsula in Victoria.

It is located at 37°56′S 147°41′E, about 15 kilometres (9 mi) south of Bairnsdale on the northern side of the Gippsland Lakes.

A long, narrow, sandy peninsula, it is the site of Duck Arm, a popular recreational bay with around thirty houses and a number of school camps.

The name refers to the plant genus Banksia, which grows in the area.
