= Louis Williams (architect) =

Louis Reginald Williams (1890–1980) was an ecclesiastical architect in Australia. He designed churches throughout the country, particularly in Victoria, primarily Anglican but also Methodists, Presbyterians, Lutherans and Christian Scientists. He himself regarded St Andrew's Anglican Church, Brighton in Melbourne, as his greatest work.

Williams was probably the major church architect in Australia in the Arts and Crafts tradition from the 1920s to the 1970s.

== Early life and training ==
Williams was born in Hobart, Tasmania and attended school at Queen's College. His father was a furniture manufacturer, and the family was very religious. Williams's interest in churches led to his choosing a career in architecture, and he was trained by Alexander North, then architect to the Diocese of Tasmania. Williams and North eventually became partners and moved to Melbourne, where they started a joint practice.

== Career ==
Williams executed some domestic and commercial commissions, but specialised in churches. His primary client was the Anglican Church; for many years he was diocesan architect for both Bathurst, where he enlarged the cathedral, and Grafton; he was advisory architect to the Chapter of Goulburn Cathedral, and designed buildings for every diocese in Victoria and also for the dioceses of Adelaide, North Queensland, Perth, Bunbury and for Devonport and Railton. He also worked for Methodists, Presbyterians, Lutherans and Christian Scientists. Churches designed by him exist throughout Australia and include concrete and timber bush buildings, suburban brick buildings, and three cathedrals, two of which he completed and one of which he designed in its entirety. He himself regarded as his best work St Andrew's Church in the Melbourne seaside suburb of Brighton, where he lived.

Williams was usually commissioned to design a church of a specified capacity within a specified budget. At a time when other architects were experimenting with new styles, he preferred to work within the traditional Arts and Crafts, Gothic style. Concerned about quality, craftsmanship and architectural integrity, he insisted on also designing furniture and fittings to harmonise with the building. He advised on lighting, stained glass, metalwork, altar furnishings, plate, carved ornamentation, murals, opus sectile mosaics, and floor coverings.

He gathered a group of trusted craftsmen with whom he usually worked, including the noted woodcarver Walter Langcake. Williams also introduced innovations that increase the sense of space in his churches and make them more comfortable in the hot climate.

His career lasted for more than 65 years, until he was 86. In World War II, when most building was suspended, he moved his practice from 108 Queen Street, Melbourne to his home in Brighton.

== Personal life ==
Williams married Mary Tasker Sampson, the sister of Senator Burford Sampson.

Later in life, years after Mary died, he married Frances Joyce McDougall (née Mason), a widow of 30 plus years. They were old family friends from Brighton and Aireys Inlet. Their children were friends from very young. (Source: Christine Frances McDonald (née McDougall), granddaughter of Frances Joyce McDougall)

== Selected works ==
- Memorial Church of St. Silas, Albert Park, Victoria.
- Holy Trinity Church of England, Ararat.
- Anglican church at Barmedman.
- Memorial Cathedral of All Saints, Bendigo.
- Anglican church of the Holy Innocents, Bourke.
- St. Peter's Anglican Church, Box Hill.
- St. Andrew's Anglican Church, Brighton, Victoria, extension including tower.
- St. Cuthbert's Church, Brunswick, Victoria.
- St Boniface Cathedral, Bunbury, Western Australia
- Anglican church at Cooee, Burnie, Tasmania.
- St. Mary's Church, South Camberwell.
- Methodist church, Canterbury, Victoria.
- St. Paul's Church of England church, Caulfield, Victoria.
- Novitiate, community buildings and chapel, Community of the Holy Name, Cheltenham, Victoria.
- St. John's Church, Colac, completion and furnishings.
- St. Stephen's Church of England, Darebin.
- St. Matthew's Church of England, East Geelong.
- St. Mary's Church of England, East Preston.
- All Saints Church, Emu
- St. Hilary's Anglican Church, Kew.
- Church and associated buildings, Flemington, Victoria.
- Memorial chapel, Flinders Naval Depot.
- St. John's Church, Footscray, tower and vicarage.
- St. Paul's Church of England, Frankston, rebuilding and extension.
- Chapel, Geelong Grammar School.
- Junior school block, Korowa Church of England Girls' Grammar School, Glen Iris.
- St. Oswald Church of England, Glen Iris.
- House of the Ascension, Goulburn, New South Wales.
- St. Alban's War Memorial Church, Griffith, New South Wales.
- Holy Trinity Church, Hastings, Victoria, extension, repairs, and fittings.
- Church of St. John, Mansfield, Victoria.
- St. David's Church of England, Moorabbin, and associated buildings.
- Presbyterian church, Murrumbeena.
- Presbyterian church, Ormond.
- Holy Trinity Church, Pascoe Vale.
- St. Stephen's Church, Peak Hill.
- Anglican Church of St. Mark, Red Cliffs.
- Anglican Church of St. Paul, Temora, remodelling and addition of church hall.
- St. John's Church, Toorak, Victoria, extension.
- St. Barnabas's Church, West Wyalong.
- St George's Anglican Church, Parkes.
- All Saints' Anglican Church, Canowindra
