= Yvonne von Hartel =

Australian architect

Yvonne von Hartel AM
- Born: Yvonne von Hartel
- Education: University of Melbourne
- Occupation: Architect
- Practice: peckvonhartel
- Website: pvh.com.au

Yvonne von Hartel AM is one of the founding members of Melbourne-based architectural and urban planning firm peckvonhartel, which was established in 1980 and since has expanded its offices to Sydney, Canberra and Brisbane. Von Hartel was the first woman to graduate with an honors degree in architecture from the University of Melbourne and is a Life Fellow of the Australian Institute of Architects (LFAIA).

In a career spanning over 48 years, she has worked on some of Australia's largest infrastructure projects, and has taught both full-time and part-time at the School of Architecture at the University of Melbourne. Von Hartel is a member of the University of Wollongong SMART Infrastructure Advisory Council and the La Trobe University Council.

== Early life and education ==
Yvonne von Hartel was born in Melbourne in August 1943 as the only child of Austrian migrants who moved to Australia in 1938. Her father was a civil engineer and the owner of an aluminium fabricating business, which partly fostered her interest in architecture.

She began studying architecture at the University of Melbourne in 1961, the first year the university offered an honours degree in the field. She studied a wide range of other subjects required to obtain an honours degree, including arts, fine arts and philosophy.

In 1961 von Hartel completed her degree, and received the Stephenson & Turner medal as the top architectural student.

Along with her degree in architecture she has also completed the Executive Management Program at the Melbourne Business School.

== Career ==
Von Hartel began her practice career while studying, working in various architectural practices during the holidays. On graduation she joined the Melbourne-based firm Yuncken Freeman. During her time at Yuncken Freeman, she worked on numerous projects in Melbourne, including the BHP House at 140 William Street. It is now recognised as a work of nationally significant twentieth-century architecture.

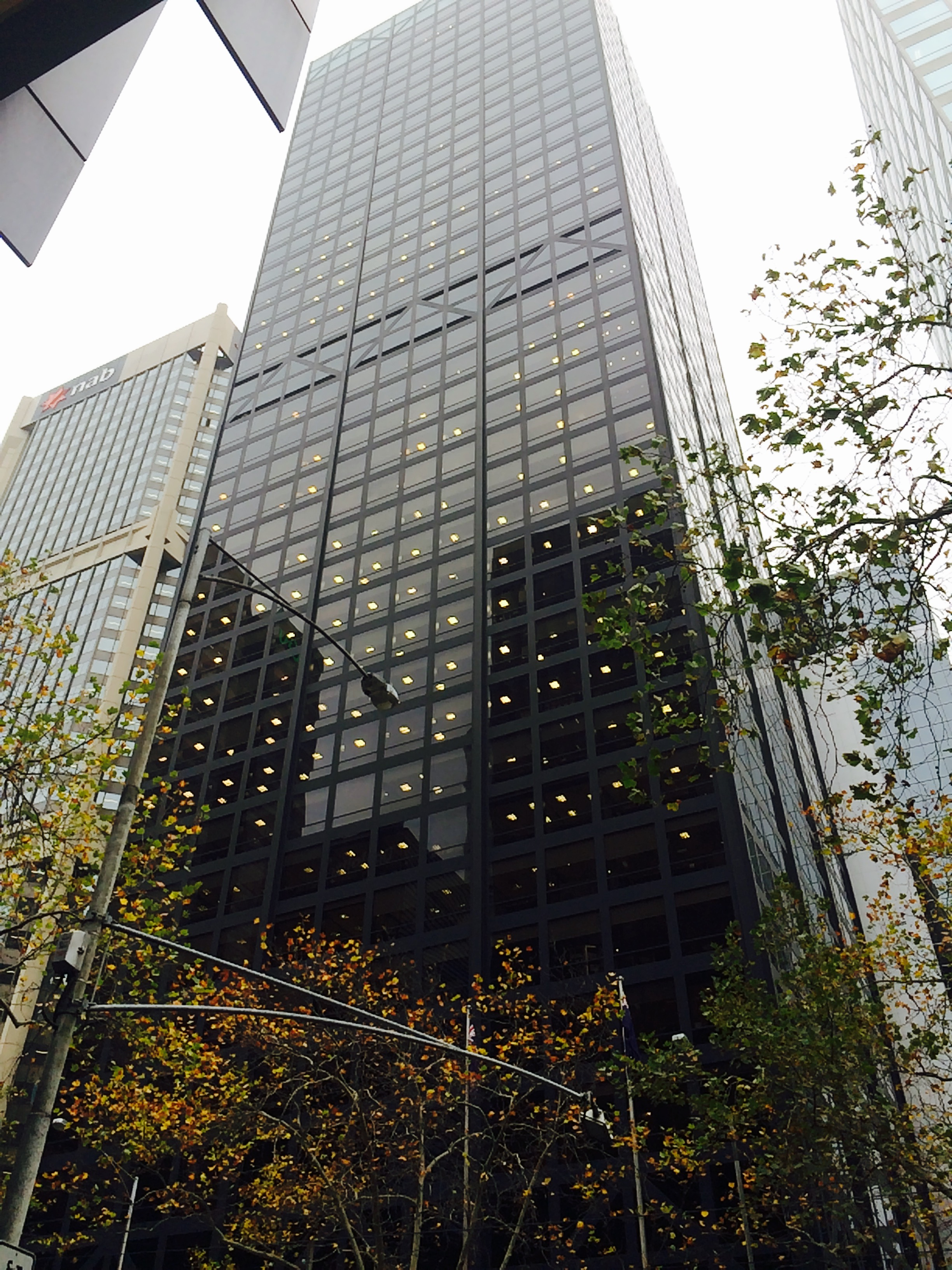
Photograph of 140 William Street

Von Hartel also tutored architecture part-time at the University of Melbourne and in 1971 she became a full-time tenured lecturer in architecture.

In 1974 Von Hartel returned to practice at Yuncken Freeman. Architect Robert Peck, who had joined Yuncken Freeman in 1968, became the managing director of Yuncken Freeman. The two then opened the Yuncken Freeman Hong Kong office (YFHK) to counteract the effect of the credit crisis in Australia, relocating many architects as they could from Melbourne to Hong Kong. They then later opened offices for Yuncken Freeman in Kuala Lumpur and Jakarta.

When the Yuncken Freeman partnership was restructured in 1980, von Hartel and Peck eventually bought the international Yuncken Freeman practice. They came back to Australia permanently in 1980 and joined with Denton Corker Marshall. The Peck Denton Corker Marshall (PDCM) company operated for five years . In 2001, they founded the peckvonhartel firm, which they're still running today, based in Melbourne, Sydney and Canberra.

=== Board memberships and adviserships ===
Throughout her career, von Hartel has also been a part of various government boards, trusts and industry advisory bodies. Roles include Director of the publicly listed company ConnectEast, the concessionaire of the 40 km tollway, Eastlink (2003–2011); trustee of the Melbourne Convention and Exhibition Centre (since 2011); and chair of the Capital Works Committee. In 2012 she was invited to become a member of the Victorian Premier's Business Roundtable.

Von Hartel has also been a Design Advisor for many projects including the Sydney International Convention (1), Exhibition and Entertainment Precinct. She has served as Chair of the Sustainability in Buildings Standards Coordination Group of Standards Australia, as inaugural chair of the Victorian Design Advisory Council, and as a Director of the national Tourism and Transport Forum. Von Hartel is also a board member of the Queen Victoria Market.

== Projects ==
A selection of projects which Yvonne has been involved with during her career:

- Victorian Desalination Plant 2013
- The Philadelphia Building Spring Street Melbourne 2011
- 25 Bligh Street Sydney Forecourt 2010
- I National Circuit Canberra 2007
- Deloitte Consulting Melbourne 2002
- Westin Hotel on Regent Place Melbourne 2000
- 333 Collins Street Melbourne 1992
- The Olderfleet Buildings 447 Collins Street Melbourne 1990
- 1 Collins Street Melbourne 1983

== Accolades ==
In 1986, she was awarded the William Wilkinson Wardell Medal for No. 1 Collins St., as well as the Merit Award for Commercial Buildings No. 1 Collins St.

She was made a Member of the Order of Australia in 2007 for her "service to architecture, design and building through involvement with a range of professional organisations, to the promotion of women in business, and to the community."

In 2014, she was given the Sir Osborn McCutcheon Award for Commercial Architecture for the Victorian Desalination Project.

She was profiled as one of the twelve women who "are doing leadership differently", for the book 'Doing Leadership Differently' by Amanda Sinclair.
