= Barry Patten =

Australian alpine skier and architect (1927–2003)

- Born: Barry Beauchamp Patten; 11 July 1927; McKinnon, Melbourne, Victoria, Australia
- Died: 12 March 2003 (aged 75)
- Education: Melbourne Technical College; University of Melbourne
- Occupation: Architect
- Children: 4 Samuel Patten; Sophie Patten; Toby Patten Victoria McCaffrey
- Practice: Yuncken Freeman and Griffiths and Simpson
- Buildings: Sidney Myer Music Bowl (1957–9); State Government Offices (1966–9); BHP House (1972)

Barry Patten
Skiing career
- Sport: Alpine skiing

Olympics
- Teams: Australia: 1952 Winter Olympics; Alpine skiing: Men's downhill; Men's giant slalom; Men's slalom

Barry Beauchamp Patten (11 July 1927 – 13 March 2003) was an Australian Olympic alpine skier and architect who designed Melbourne's Sidney Myer Music Bowl.

== Background and early career ==
Patten was born in McKinnon, Melbourne, Victoria. He was educated at Caulfield Grammar School and he studied architecture first at Melbourne Technical College before completing his degree at the University of Melbourne in 1951. At age 24, he competed for Australia at the 1952 Winter Olympics in Oslo as an alpine skier, although he did not progress to the medal rounds.

Patten was the father of Samuel Patten, a former world champion and Olympic rower, who was part of the first incarnation of the Oarsome Foursome coxless four.

== Architectural career ==
Patten joined the architecture firm of Yuncken Freeman Brothers, Griffiths and Simpson.

In 1957, he submitted a design for the Sidney Myer Music Bowl in Melbourne. His design was chosen for the bowl and he worked as the project architect.

Patten designed three buildings in Victoria which are now on the Victorian Heritage Register:

- the Myer Music Bowl;
- the former BHP House (now called 140 William Street);
- the Victoria State Government Offices.

== See also ==
- List of Caulfield Grammar School people
