= Legislative Assembly Building, Canberra =

Australian Capital Territory government building

Legislative Assembly Building
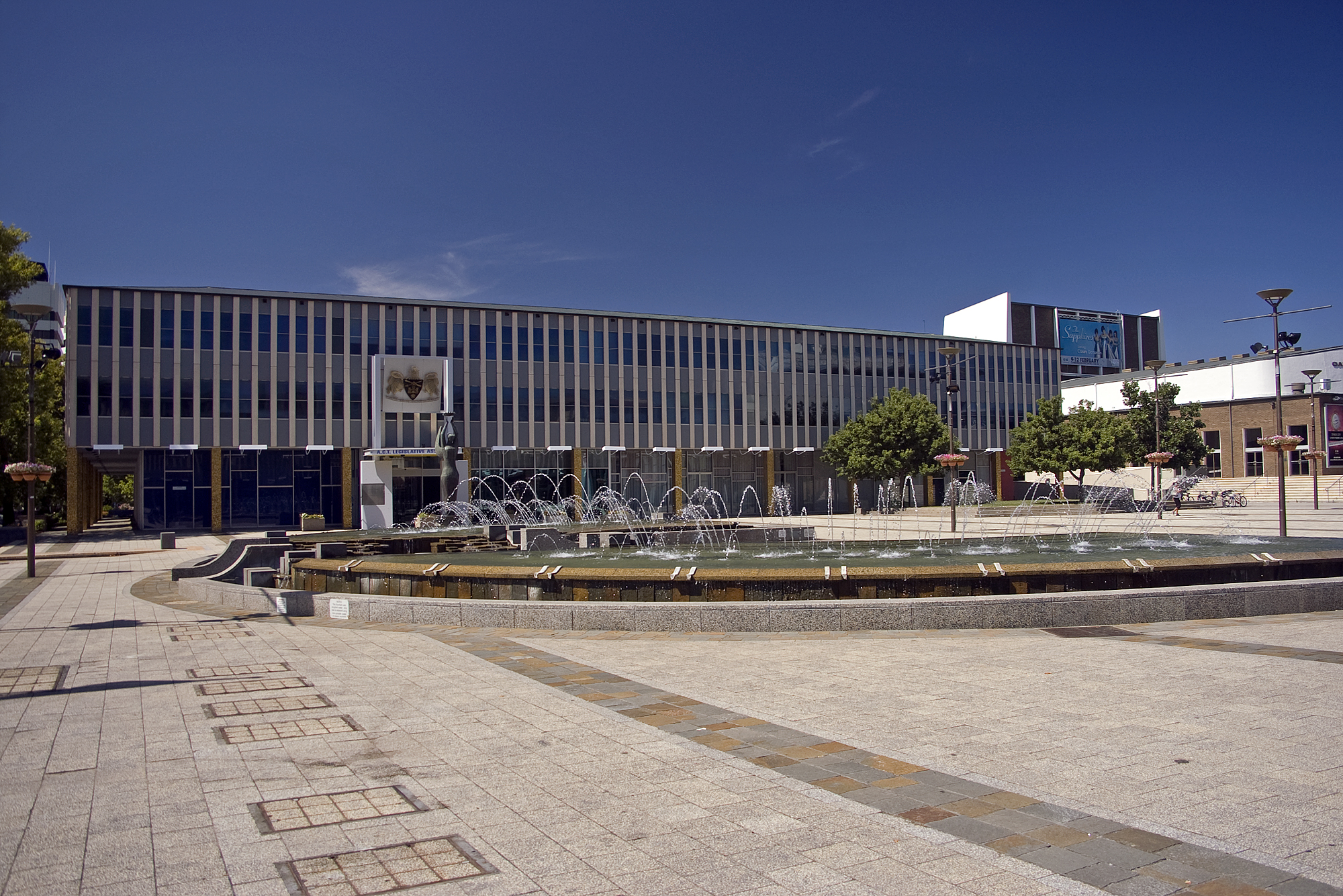
- Legislative Assembly Building

General information
- Type: Legislative
- Architectural style: Post-War International
- Location: 196 London Circuit, Canberra, Australian Capital Territory, Australia
- Coordinates: 35.281641°S 149.13117°E
- Construction started: 1959; 67 years ago
- Completed: 1961; 65 years ago
- Renovated: 1994; 32 years ago
- Client: National Capital Development Commission
- Owner: ACT Government

Design and construction
- Architect: Roy Simpson
- Architecture firm: Yuncken Freeman
- Main contractor: Concrete Constructions Pty Ltd

The Australian Capital Territory Legislative Assembly Building, also known as the South Building, is located on the southern side of Civic Square, London Circuit, Civic in the Australian Capital Territory. The public entrance to the Assembly is accessible from Civic Square, on the eastern side adjacent to the Canberra Theatre Centre.

== History ==
The building was designed as one part of the Canberra Civic Square, also incorporating the Canberra Theatre and Museum, in 1959–1961 by Roy Simpson of Yuncken Freeman for the National Capital Development Commission. Originally was known as the "Civic Offices", they were originally built to house the offices of the ACT Advisory Council, the ACT Industrial Court and the Department of the Interior. The modernist-style building has been the home of the Australian Capital Territory Legislative Assembly since 1994 after it was refurbished to accommodate the Chamber and provide space for offices. The Assembly first met during 1989 in a temporary Chamber at 1 Constitution Avenue.

The ACT Coat of Arms over the entrance were designed by Lenore Bass, wife of Tom Bass who created the "Ethos" sculpture in Civic Square, and unveiled in September 1961.
