= AON Centre (Royal Insurance Building) =

Coordinates: 37°49′2″S 144°57′36″E

AON Centre (Royal Insurance Group Building)
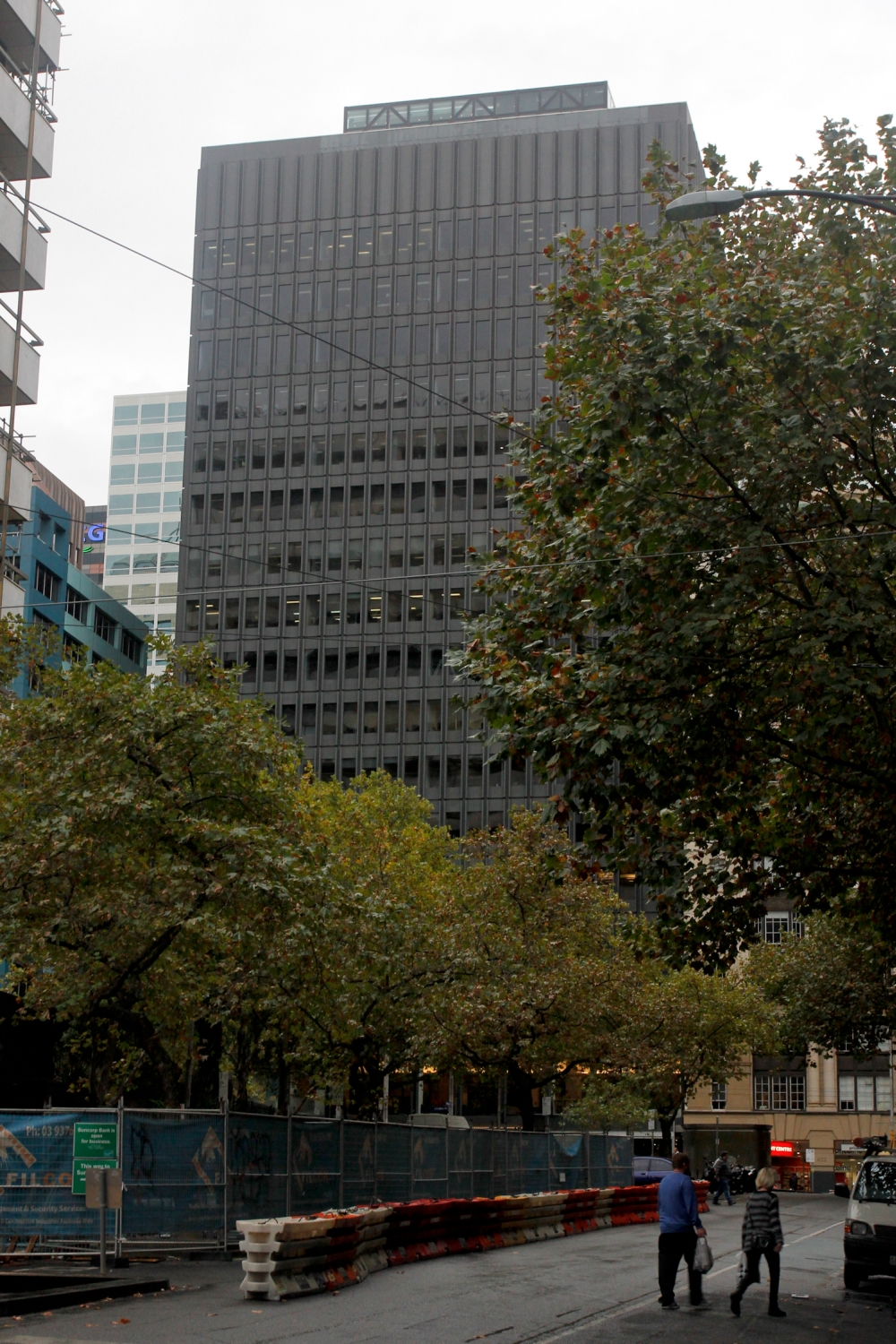
- Interactive map of the AON Centre (Royal Insurance Group Building) area

General information
- Status: Completed
- Type: Office
- Location: 430—444 Collins Street, Melbourne, Victoria, Australia
- Completed: 1965

Height
- Roof: 70 m (230 ft)

Technical details
- Floor count: 18

Design and construction
- Architect: Yuncken Freeman

AON Centre (Royal Insurance Group Building) is a commercial office complex located in Melbourne, Victoria, Australia at 430—444 Collins Street, in the heart of the Melbourne CBD. A product of a rigorous design process from Australian architecture firm Yuncken Freeman Architects in 1962, the building undertook a two-year construction period and in 1965 it was first opened revealing a 70 metre high 18-storey structure.

== Description ==
The AON Centre is one of Melbourne’s earliest examples of the International Style in office design and was the key point in the commencement of a series of black clad commercial and institutional buildings designed and produced by the Yuncken Freeman Architects firm throughout the later half of the 20th Century.

The building uses a curtain wall façade system in conjunction with precast concrete clad panels finished in reconstructed black granite. Each panel used in the construction of the building was pre-fitted with double-glazed dark thermal tinted glass before the structure was erected. The precision and intelligence of the design allowed the glazing system to be installed so that from the exterior no suspending frame is visible, giving the building a seamless, sleek and polished finish.

The curtain wall façade system uses thick black extruded elements and mullions that are highly repetitive on the façade and create a sense of verticality to the building. The façade is set back from the street through the use of a small plaza at the front of the building. This plaza gives space back to the CBD whilst acts as the entrance to the building.

== Awards ==
The building is highly recognised and applauded for its simple but formal arrangement and its execution in its details, and received the 1967 Victorian Architecture Medal in the General Building category.

== Key influences and design approach ==
The AON Centre was influenced by the classical formalism of Mies van der Rohe and Skidmore, Owings & Merrill, in particular Yuncken Freeman drew upon Mies Van Der Rohe’s Federal Center in Chicago (1964) in a more formalised manner the Seagram Building, New York (1958) was also used as inspiration. The Seagram Building was used as a precedent when it comes to creating open space that is used by the public as they enter the building.

The dark cladding of the building gives it the distinctive Yuncken Freeman look, which is notable in some of the firm’s other works such as the Flagstaff House at 411—415 King Street, Melbourne, Australia (1968). The façade is similar in all elevations of the building and boasts a highly regular motif that is repeated twelve times on the north and south sides and fifteen times on the east and west sides.

== Heritage ==
On Friday 22 of August 2008 the AON Centre’s application to be considered for a heritage listing was refused.

Photographs of the original interiors can be viewed on Trove, taken by Wolfgang Sievers in 1965.

== Gallery ==
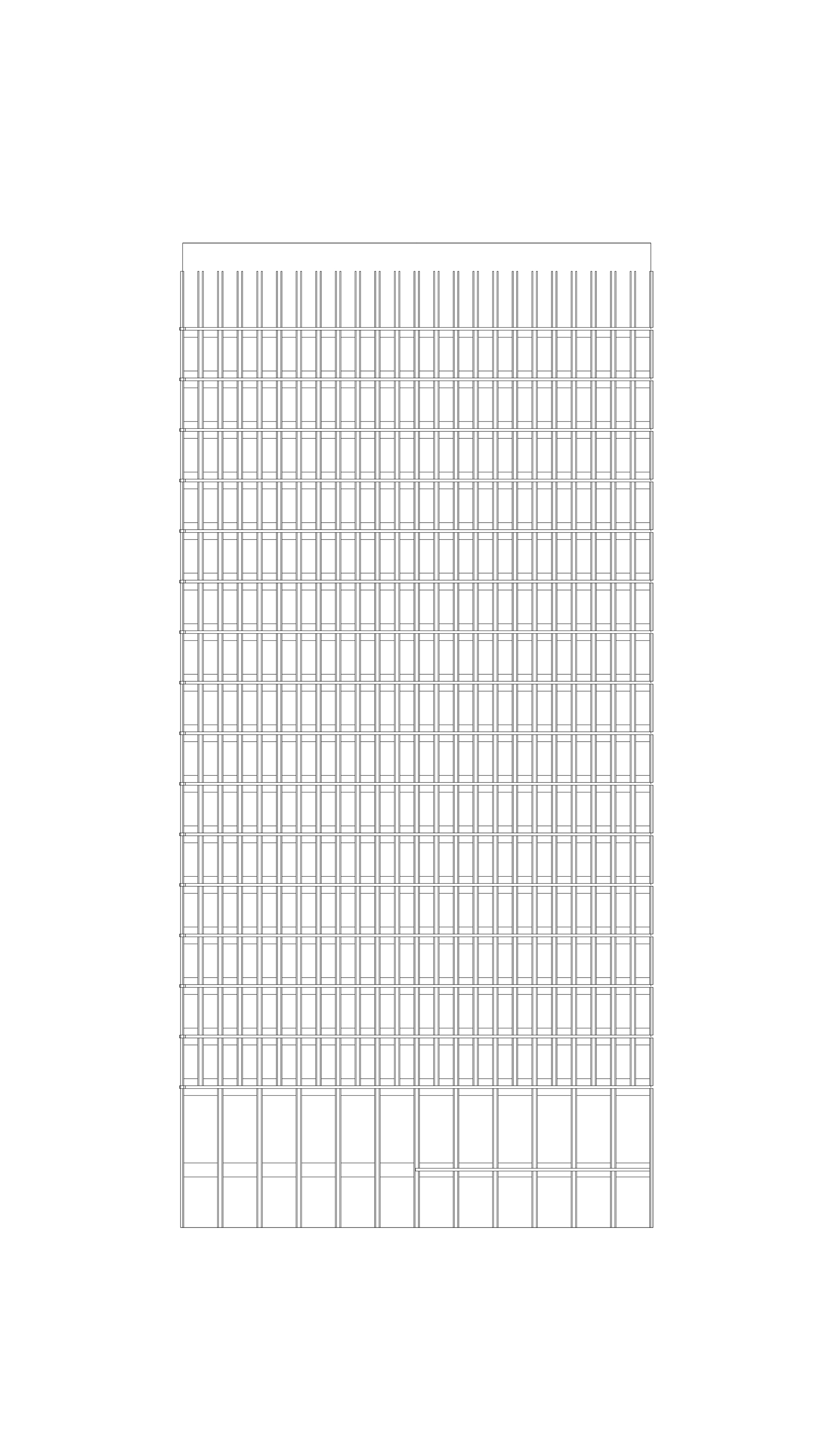
AON Centre (Royal Insurance Building), Melbourne, elevation

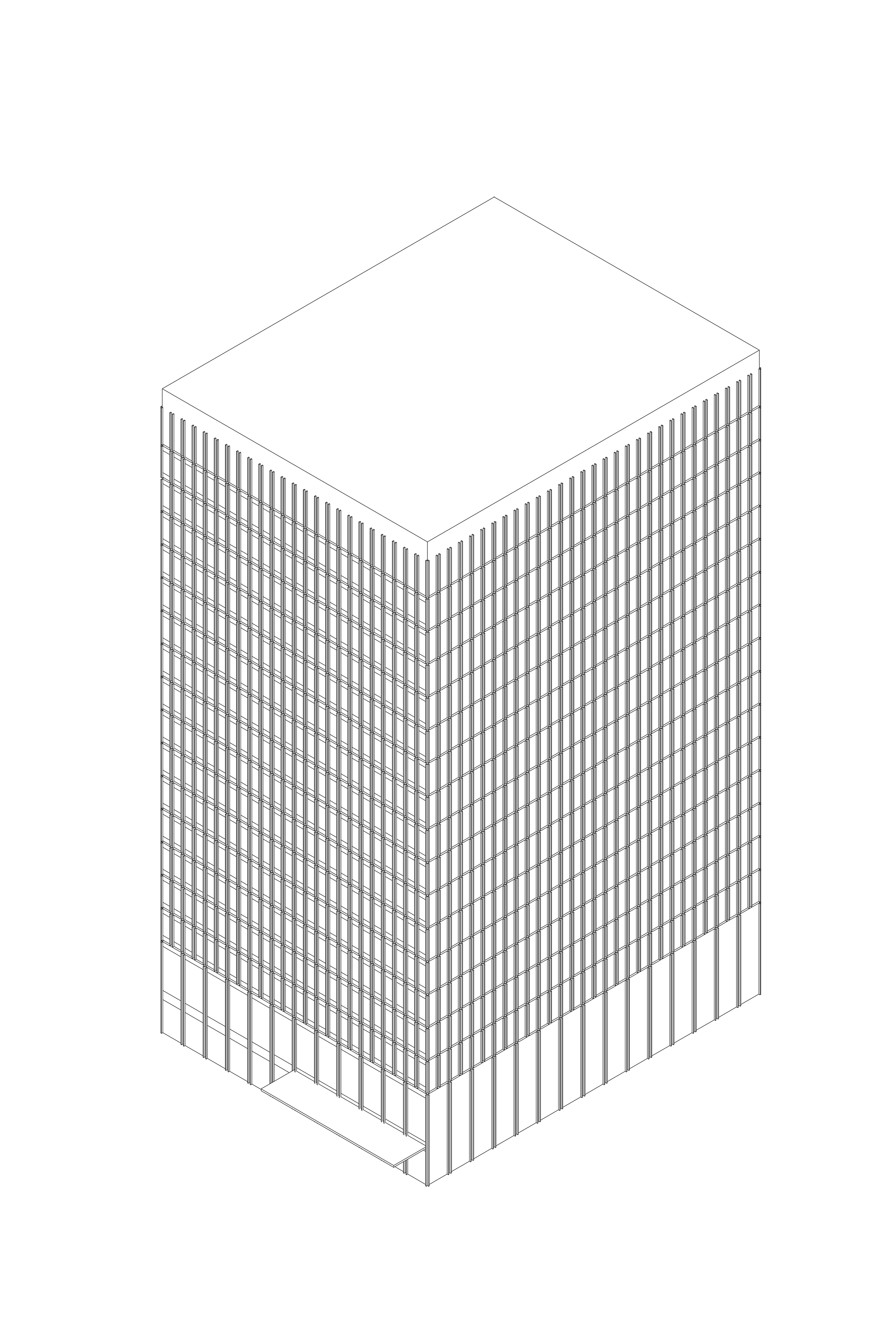
AON Centre (Royal Insurance Building), Melbourne, isometric

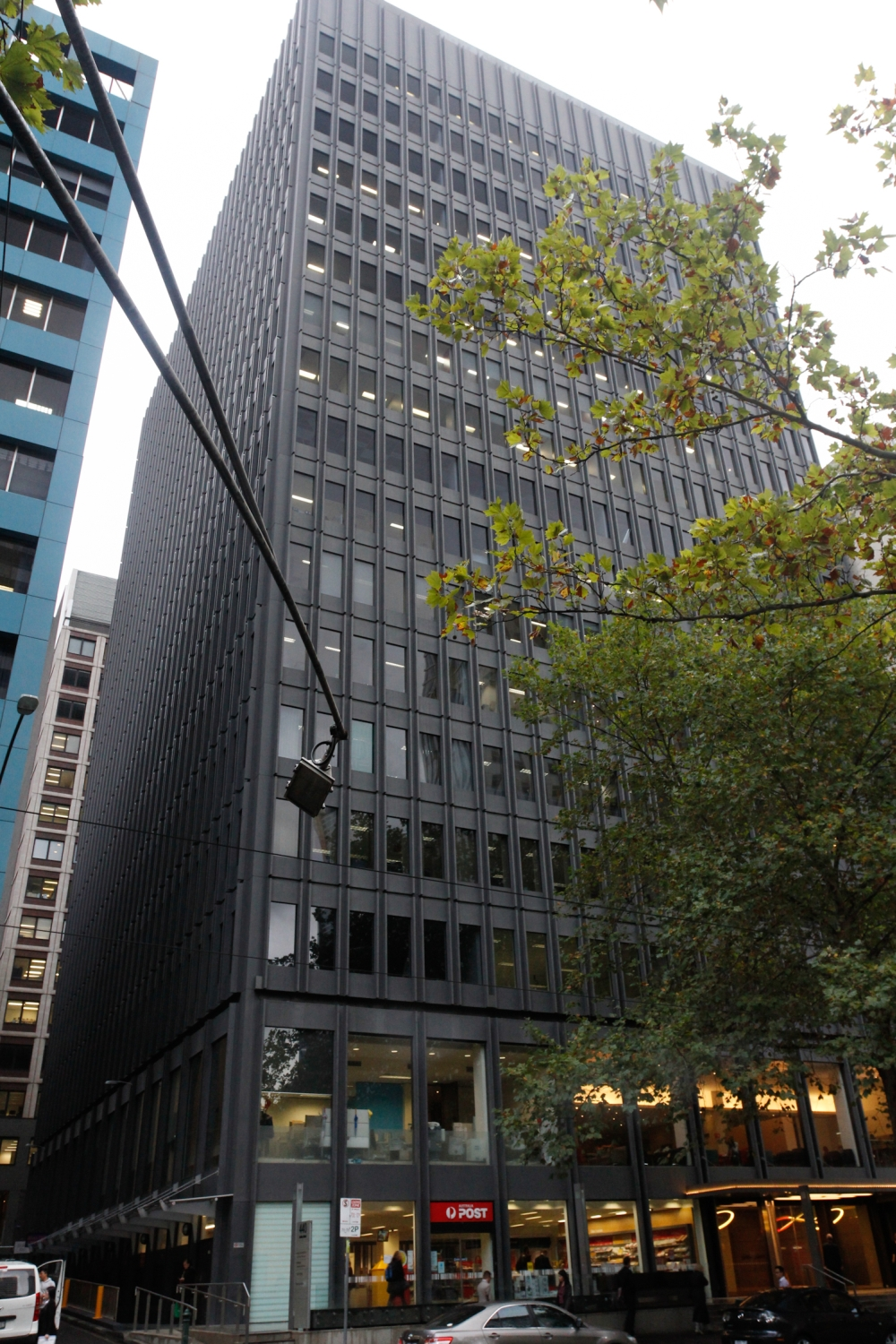
AON Centre (Royal Insurance Building), Melbourne, view from Collins Street

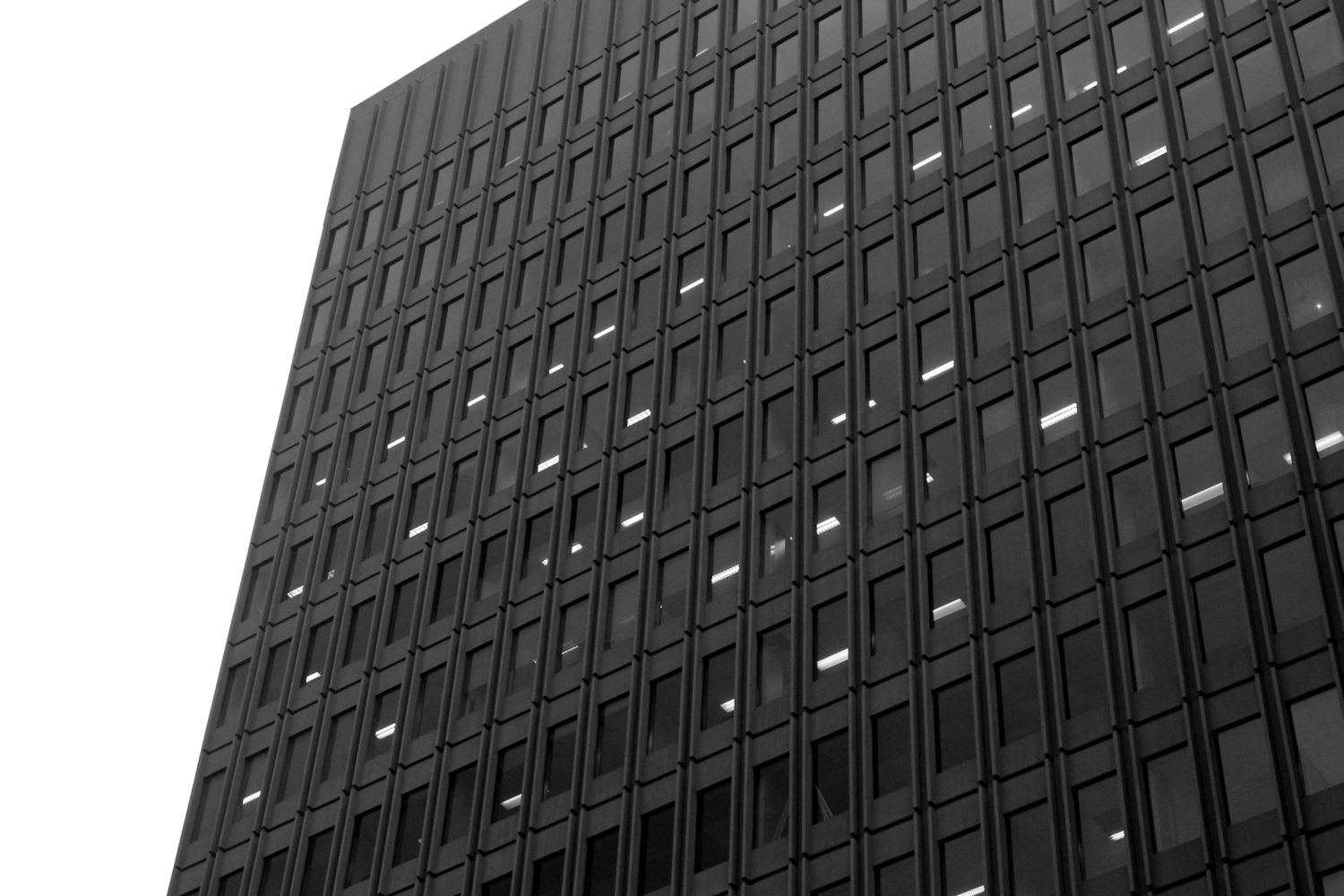
AON Centre (Royal Insurance Building), Melbourne, floor levels

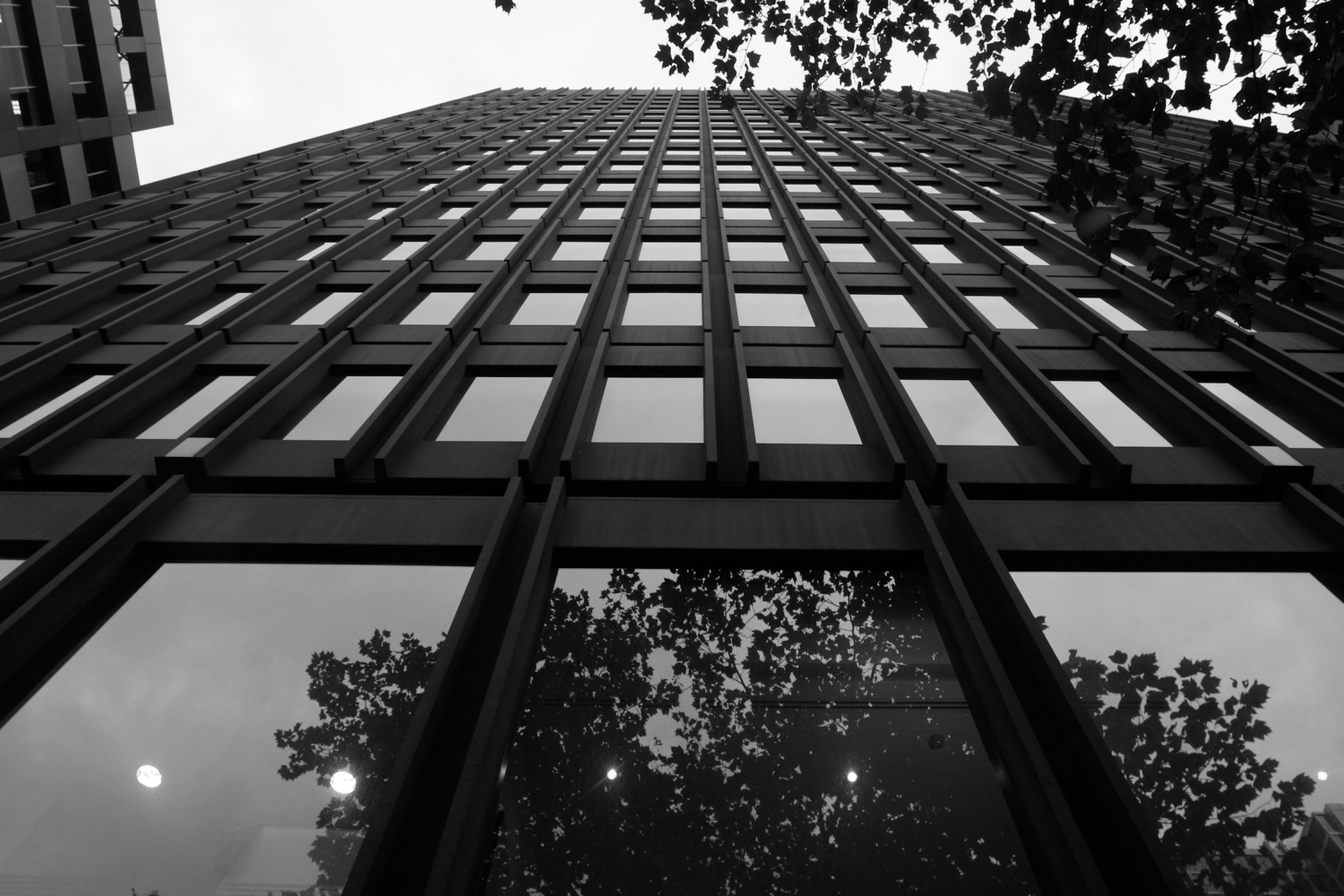
AON Centre (Royal Insurance Building), Melbourne, facade detail

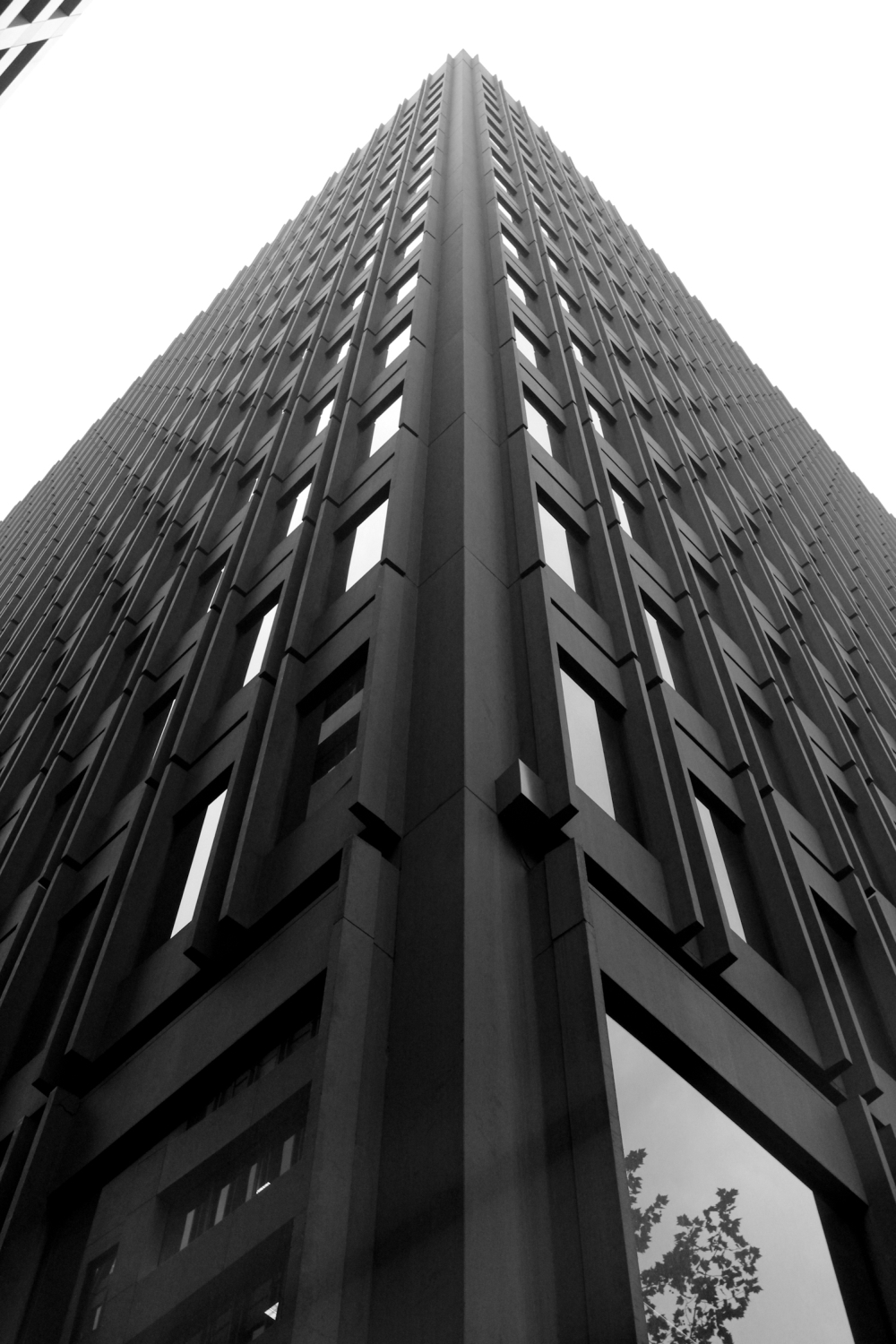
AON Centre (Royal Insurance Building), Melbourne, corner detail
