= Cardinal Knox Centre =

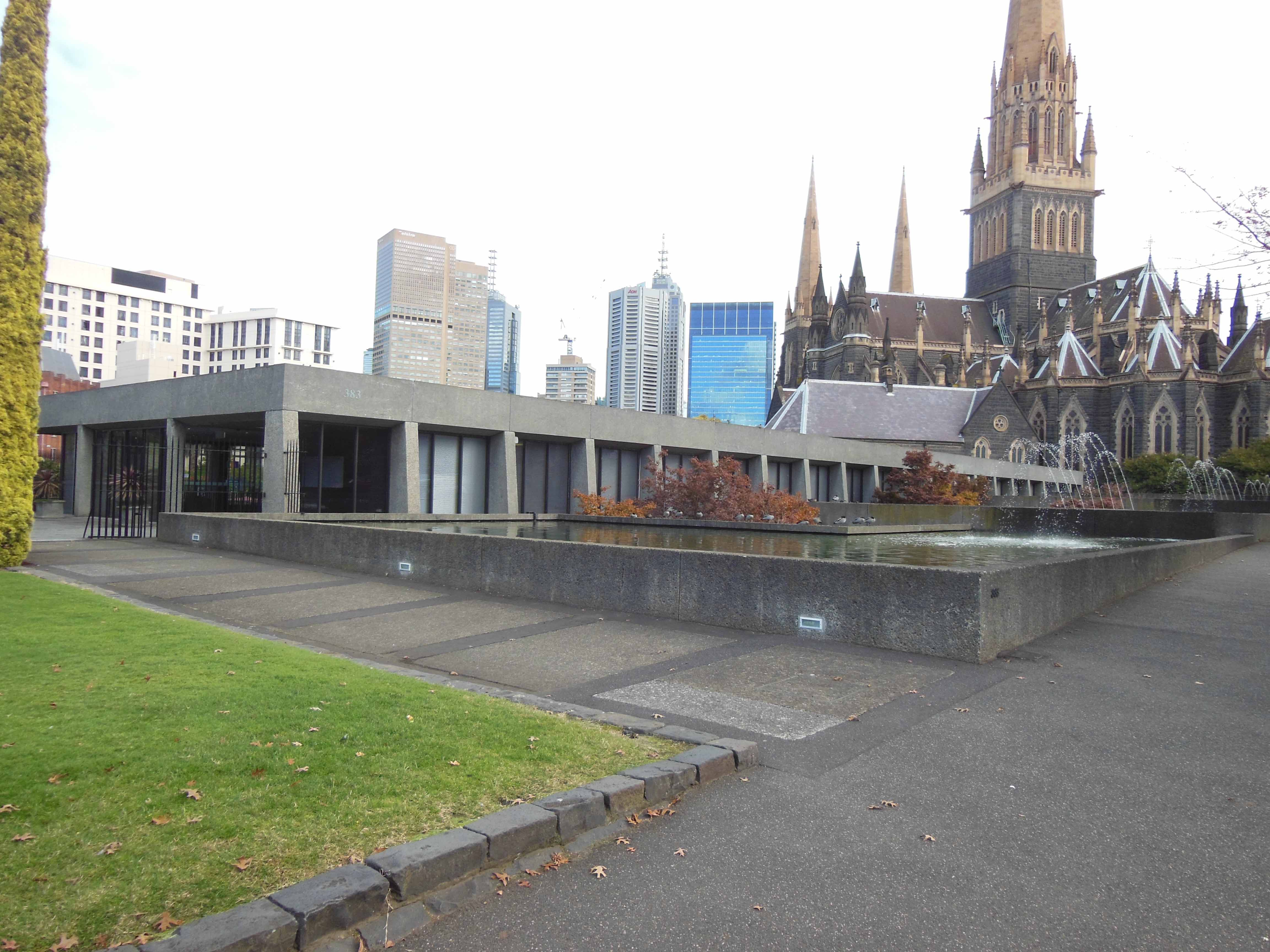
- Cardinal Knox Centre entrance
- Interactive map of the Cardinal Knox Centre area

General information
- Architectural style: Modernist with monolithic concrete column extrusions
- Location: 383 Albert Street, East Melbourne, Victoria, Australia
- Coordinates: 37°48′36″S 144°58′40″E
- Construction started: 1971
- Client: Roman Catholic Archdiocese of Melbourne

Design and construction
- Architect: Roy Simpson
- Architecture firm: Yuncken Freeman

The Cardinal Knox Centre is a noted Modernist church administration centre located adjacent to St Patrick's Cathedral, at 383 Albert Street, East Melbourne, Victoria, Australia. It was commissioned by the Roman Catholic Archdiocese of Melbourne in 1968, and the architects were Yuncken Freeman, lead architect, Roy Simpson. It replaced the 1855 bluestone Saint Patrick’s College, controversially demolished in 1971, leaving a single bluestone tower as a preserved fragment.

== Description ==
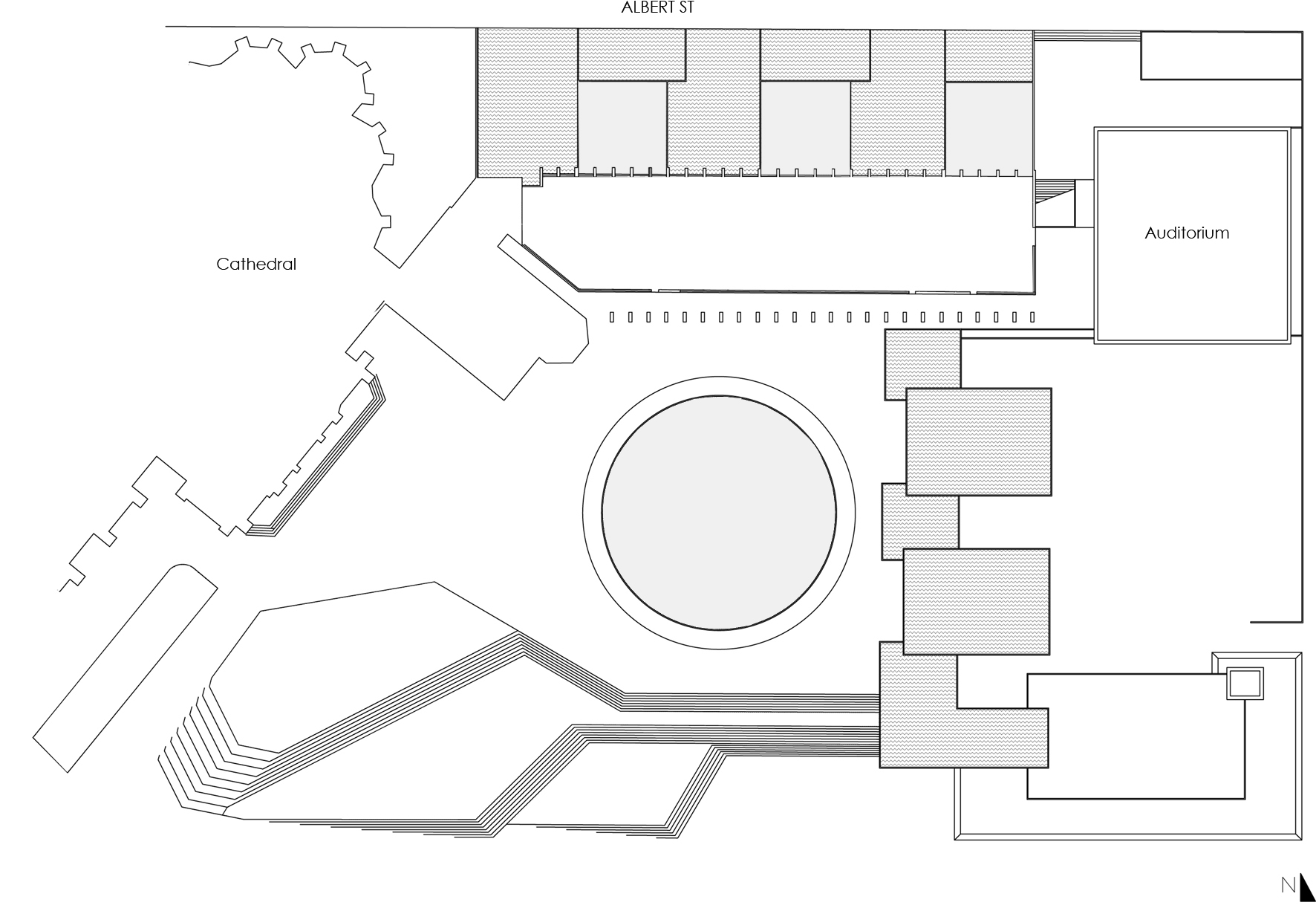
Redevelopment concept plan, April 2013

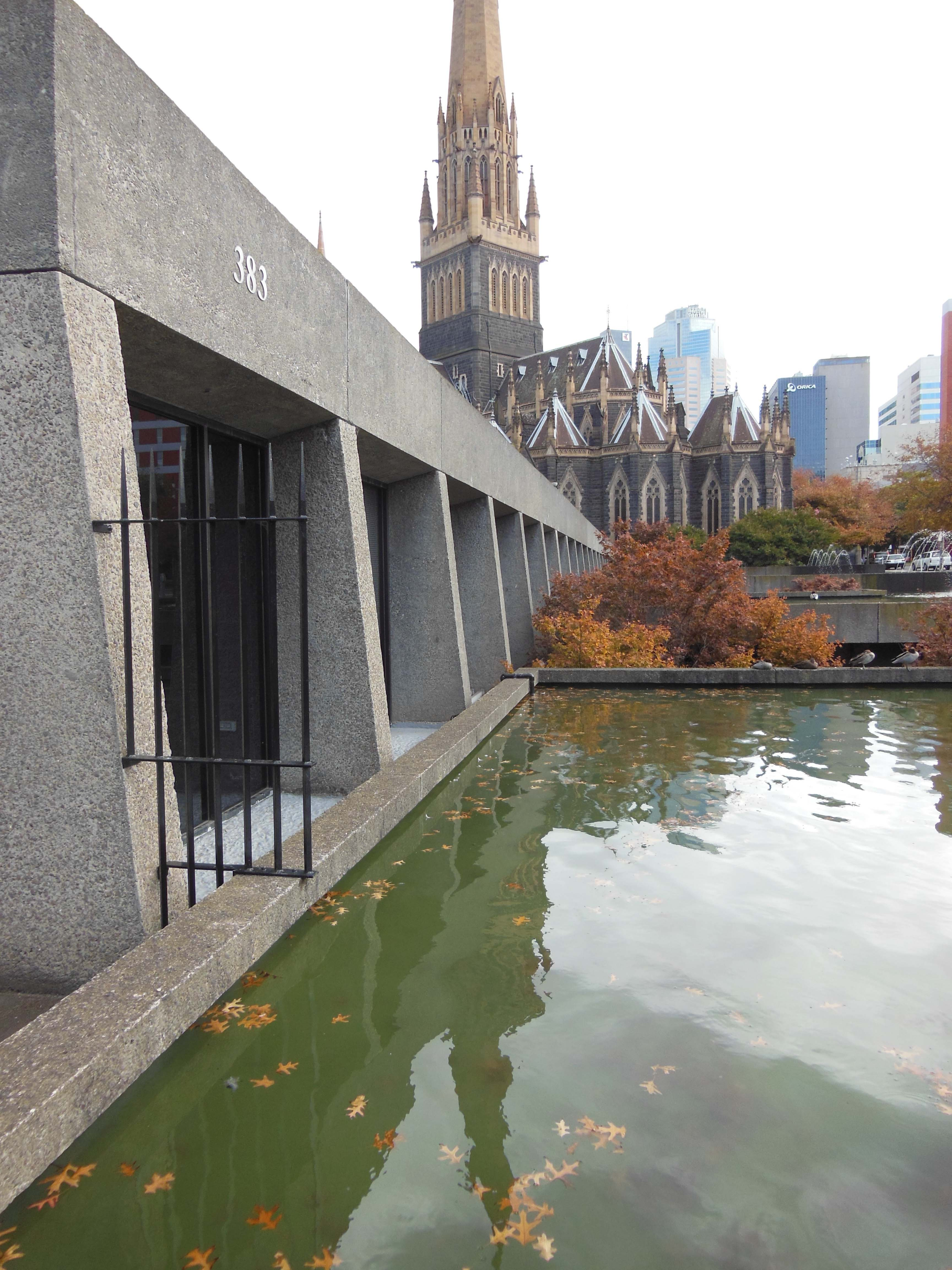
Cardinal Knox Centre Albert Street frontage looking west.

The key idea behind what was at first simply called the Diocesan Centre was to allow for extensive office and meeting space, and living quarters for resident clergy, whilst also being as low and unobtrusive as possible, to allow uninterrupted views towards the 19th century Gothic Revival Cathedral from the east.

This is achieved by being set into the low rise of the site, and partly below ground, and inward looking, with windows opening into a variety of courtyards, including a large central circular courtyard. From most aspects, the site appears to be mainly water features or landscaping, with long low concrete or stone walls.

The Albert Street frontage consists of a series of reflecting pools, largely hiding the two-storey building behind, composed of long low pre-cast concrete solid battered piers supporting a simple horizontal beam with deep inset glazed openings. The lower floor looks into courtyards planted with trees, formed by the L-shaped pools. The same expression is used to the rear of the Albert Street frontage block and the interior of the circular courtyard. Varied shapes were tested for this courtyard, however, the final design chosen was circular, complete with another reflecting pool around its edge.

The Albert Street water features step down the slight slope, and include water jets linking one to the next, with the main entrance located at the east end of the main building and pools.

The Lansdowne Street corners are each built up with low sloped rough bluestone block bases supporting lawn and plantings. The Lansdowne Street frontage is primarily car parking, screened by ashlar bluestone block walls, with the entrance located next to the remaining tower of St Patrick's College.

The Cathedral Place frontage was originally a private garden behind fencing; in 2000 this was opened up by the creation of the Pilgrim's Path landscaped walkway up to the east door of the Cathedral, also creating public access to the paths on top of the lower part of the Cardinal Knox Centre.

== Key influences and design approach ==
St Patrick's Cathedral is a monumental icon of Melburnian architecture. Hence, Simpson wished to design a building that enhanced its greatness rather than attempting to add on or overshadow the cathedral’s design. Various historical precedents were looked at to help understand the best way to approach adapting such a historical landmark. These precedents include: Notre Dame Cathedral, York Minster, Church of St. Trophime, and Saint Mark's Basilica.

The Victorian Heritage Database entry notes that "The sympathetic use of materials, low profile and use of water ponds to the roofs fronting Victoria Parade helps the offices and presbytery to seem more of a landscape element than a building." Simpson himself felt that "…The opening of the Cathedral grounds to Fitzroy Gardens could create great new civic space…"

The 25 year award from the Architectural Institute of Australia (Victoria) in 2004 praised the design because "it speaks about its own time and architectural intent".

== Awards ==
- 25 Year Award, Maggie Edmond Enduring Architecture Award, 2004

== Gallery ==
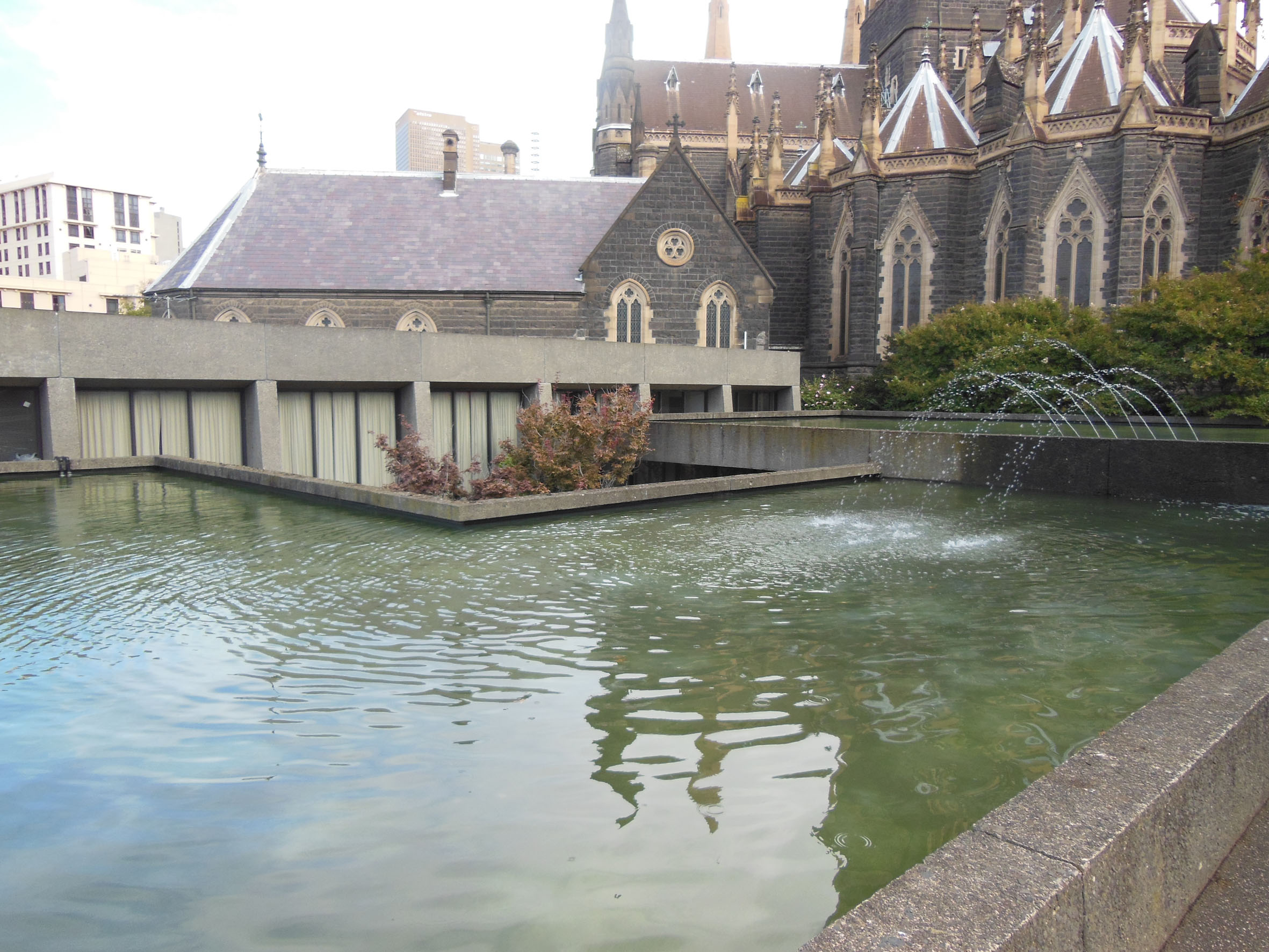
Cardinal Knox Centre- Water Feature

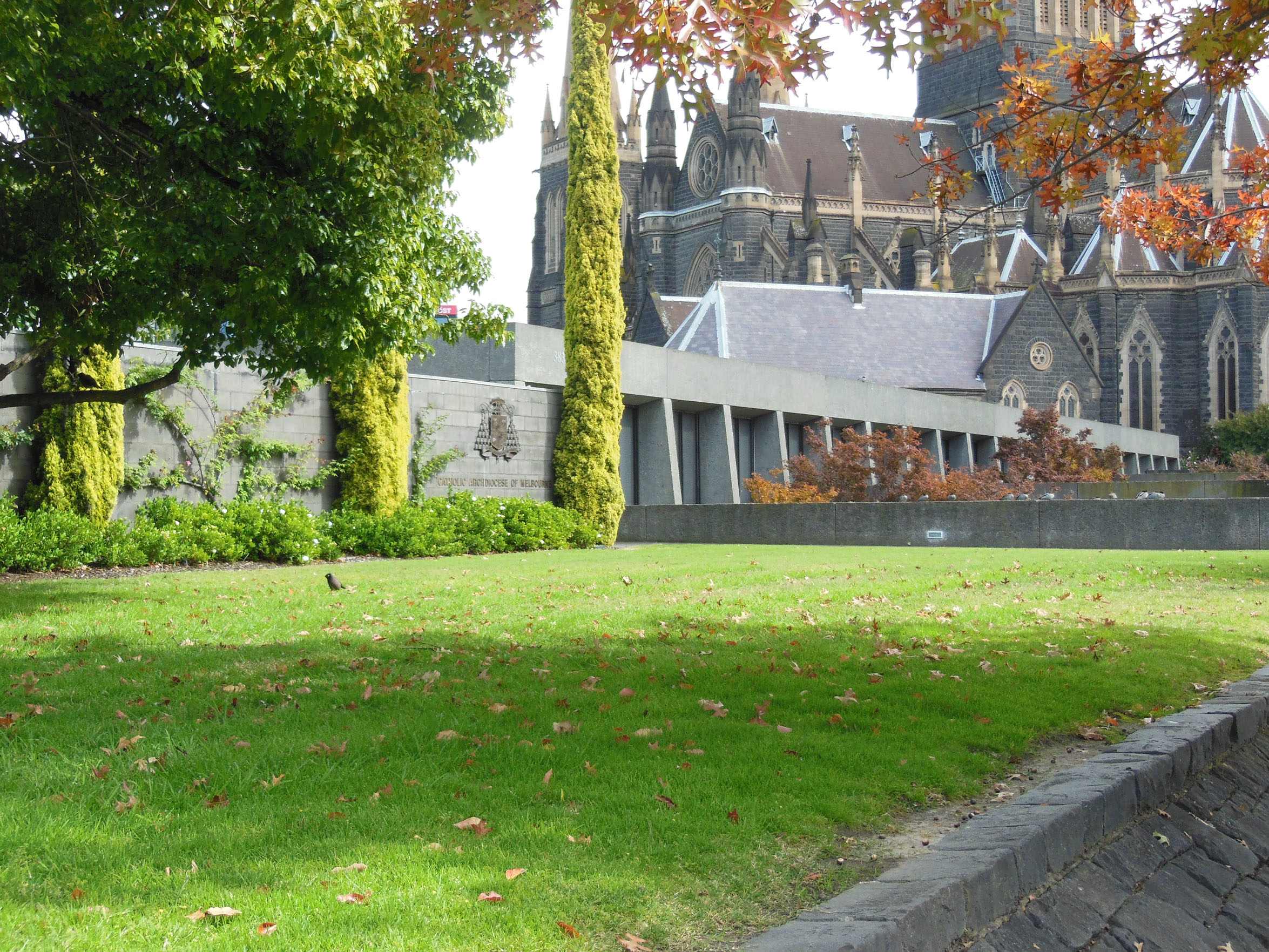
Cardinal Knox Centre- Garden

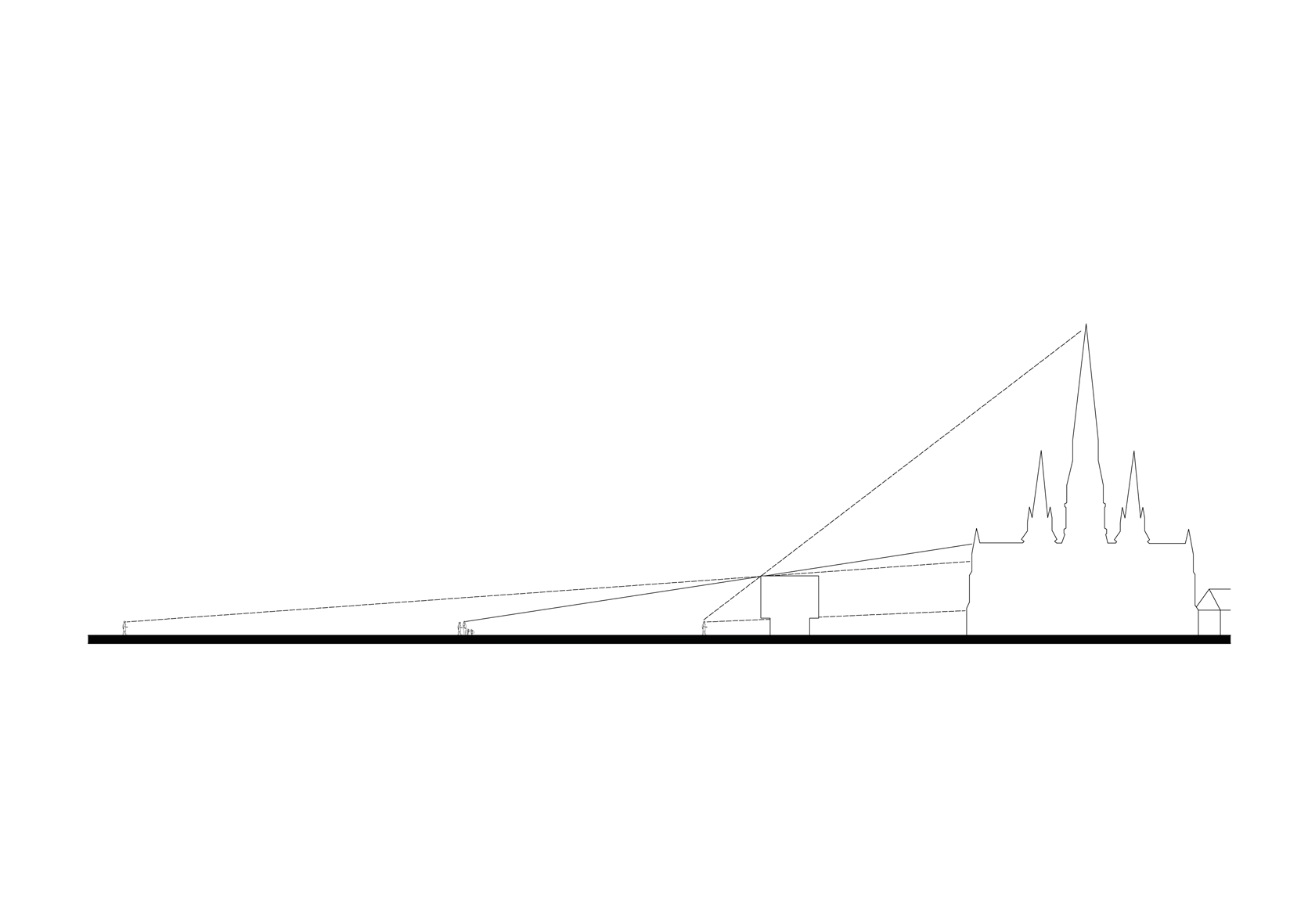
Cardinal Knox Centre, Melbourne Sight Diagram
