= Sidney Myer Music Bowl =

Outdoor performance venue in Melbourne, Australia

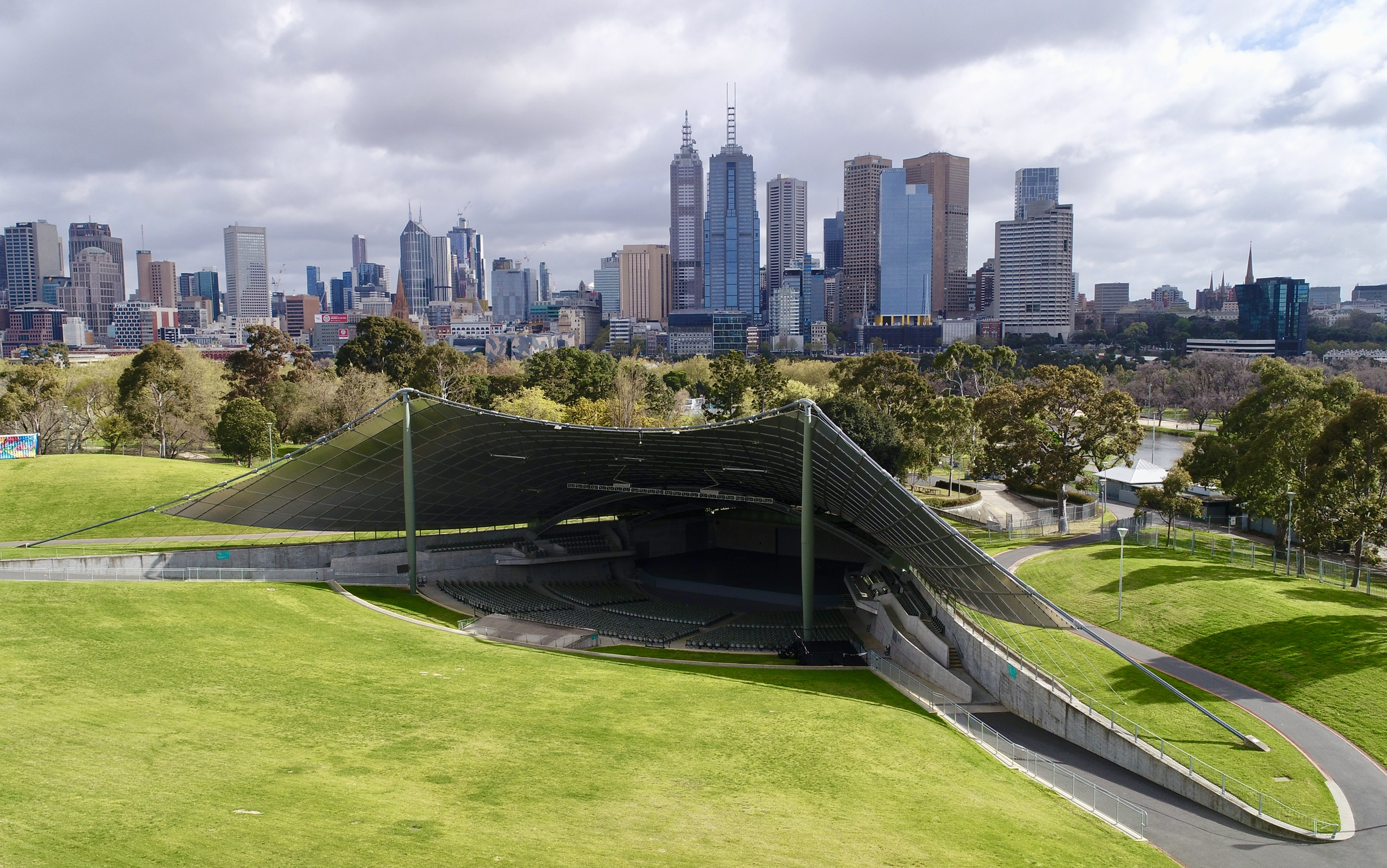
- Sidney Myer Music Bowl in September 2017
- Interactive map of Sidney Myer Music Bowl
- Address: Kings Domain; Melbourne; Australia
- Coordinates: 37.8233149°S 144.9746821°E
- Owner: Government of Victoria
- Operator: The Arts Centre
- Capacity: Up to 10,000 (2,030 fixed seats)
- Surface: Concrete, grass
- Public transit: Grant St-Police Memorial/St Kilda Rd (#17): 3, 5, 6, 16, 64, 67, 72

Construction
- Groundbreaking: 1958; 68 years ago
- Opened: 1959; 67 years ago
- Architect: Barry Patten
- General contractor: John Holland

Tenants
- Carols by Candlelight; Melbourne Symphony Orchestra

Website
- Arts Centre Melbourne

Australian National Heritage List
- Type: Historic
- Criteria: b, d, f, g, h
- Designated: 21 September 2005; 20 years ago
- Reference no.: 105743

Victorian Heritage Register
- Official name: Sidney Myer Music Bowl
- Type: State Registered Place
- Designated: 19 April 2001
- Reference no.: H1772
- Heritage Overlay number: HO908

The Sidney Myer Music Bowl is an outdoor bandshell performance venue in Melbourne, Victoria, Australia. It is located in the lawns and gardens of Kings Domain on Linlithgow Avenue close to the Arts Centre and the Southbank entertainment precinct. It was opened by Prime Minister Robert Menzies on 12 February 1959.

== History ==
The businessman and philanthropist Sidney Myer inspired the construction of the building after attending the Hollywood Bowl in Los Angeles. A violinist who enjoyed music, Myer established free open-air concerts with the Melbourne Symphony Orchestra in 1929, which were always well attended by Melburnians. These free concerts continue to this day, now being held at the bowl itself. There are usually three or four concerts a year.

Upon his death in 1934, the Sidney Myer Fund was established to continue the tradition of philanthropy begun by its founder. The design and construction of a music bowl for the people of Melbourne was decided upon and funded by the fund.

The venue was officially opened by Prime Minister Robert Menzies on 12 February 1959, and was attended by an audience of 30,000. Later that month over 70,000 people attended to hear the American evangelist Billy Graham.

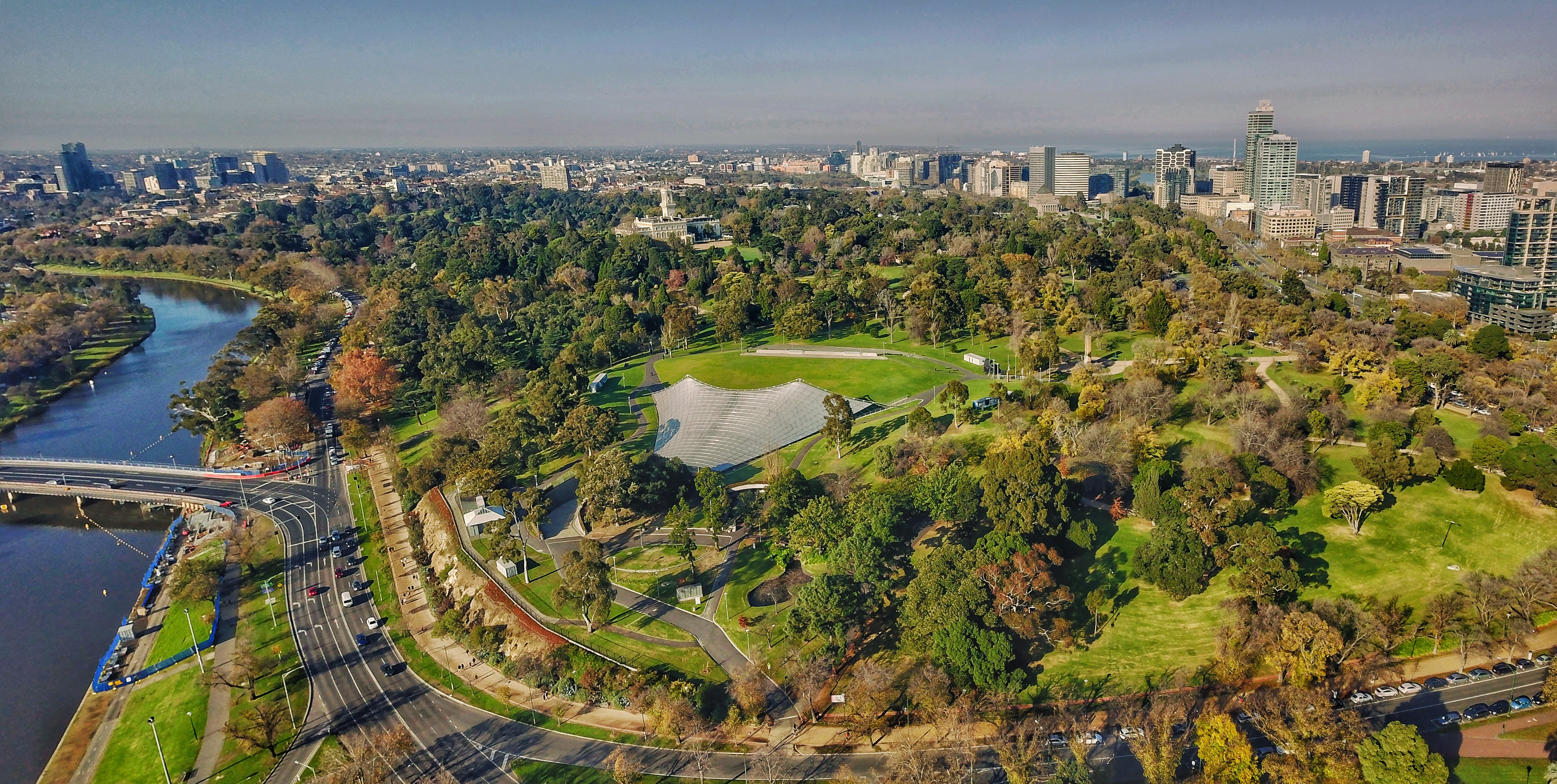
Aerial perspective of the Sidney Myer Bowl, in relation to the Yarra River and Alexandra Gardens

The largest crowd ever for a concert event in Australia was The Seekers 1967 homecoming concert at the Sidney Myer Music Bowl which an estimated 200,000 people attended. The 2007 Guinness Book of World Records lists it as the greatest attendance at a concert in the Southern Hemisphere in history. This attendance is also included in The Australian Book of Records. Melburnians were celebrating the annual Moomba Festival, a free community festival, and many thousands were enjoying other attractions but are included in the crowd estimate. Since then, international performers have included: ABBA, AC/DC, Metallica, Wings, Blondie, the Beach Boys, Crowded House, Dire Straits, Neil Diamond, Bob Dylan, the Czech Philharmonic Orchestra, Merle Haggard, Pearl Jam, the Electric Light Orchestra, Paul McCartney, Midnight Oil, INXS, R.E.M., Kiri Te Kanawa, Daft Punk, Red Hot Chili Peppers and, in more recent times, Bon Jovi, Guns N' Roses, Soundgarden, Tool, Kanye West, Paramore, Neil Young, Lenny Kravitz, Swedish House Mafia, Blink-182, The Black Keys, Lorde, Afrojack, KSHMR, Will Sparks, Timmy Trumpet, Carnage, Axwell, The Cat Empire, David Byrne and The Chainsmokers.

In 1980, administration of the bowl was handed over to the Arts Centre Melbourne from the Sidney Myer Fund by Ken Myer, Sidney Myer's son. In 1984 a temporary ice-skating rink was created on the bowl's stage for use during winter months. The venue was closed for a major renovation in 2000 to bring the facilities up to an appropriate standard, and was reopened by the Premier of Victoria, Steve Bracks, at Carols by Candlelight on Christmas Eve, 2002. Recent works on the lawns extending from the seating and stage, and the construction of a fence and gates has reduced the total capacity to a little over 12,000.

=== 50th anniversary celebrations ===
In 2009, the 50th anniversary of the Sidney Myer Music Bowl was celebrated. The Arts Centre put together a four-day commemorative program of free events. From 12 to 15 February, the festivities featured two concerts from the Melbourne Symphony Orchestra, including a recreation of their 1959 opening concert of the bowl and a romantic Valentine's Day program; a salute to 50 years of rock and roll at the bowl from RocKwiz and an afternoon picnic of family entertainment. There was also an informative exhibition at the St Kilda Road Foyer Gallery of the Arts Centre and a commemorative website depicting 50 years of the bowl.

== Design and construction ==
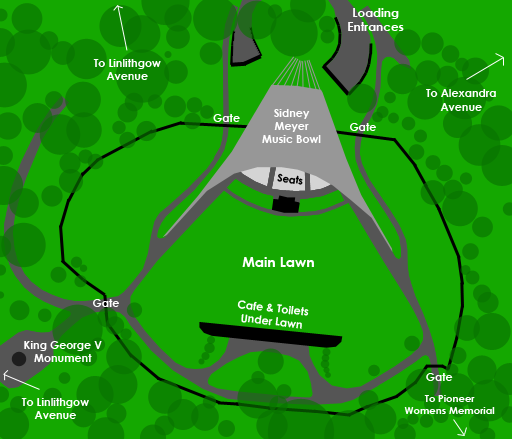
A map of the Sidney Myer Music Bowl

The bowl's canopy consists of a thin membrane made out of half an inch of weather-proofed plywood sheeted on both sides with aluminium attached to a cobwebbed frame of steel cables and supported by 21.3 metres (70 ft) masts pivoted to the earth. The total area of the canopy is 4,055 square metres (43,650 sq ft). The main cable at the edge of the canopy comprises 7 ropes, each about 9 cm in diameter and 173 metres (568 ft) long, anchored deep into the ground in concrete blocks. Longitudinal cables hold up the roof and transverse cables hold it down.

Project design was by Yuncken Freeman and Griffiths and Simpson during 1956. The project architect was Barry Patten. Construction by John Holland commenced in 1958 with an innovative system of cables laced together and covered with aluminium faced plywood sandwich panels. To ensure the structure would be watertight yet aerodynamically stable and flexible, new construction techniques were developed. Ground anchors were required to be corrosion resistant. The shell also needed to be acoustically correct. Construction entailed input from a number of engineering and scientific organisations including the Aeronautical Research Laboratories and CSIRO Forest Products Division.

=== Structural design ===
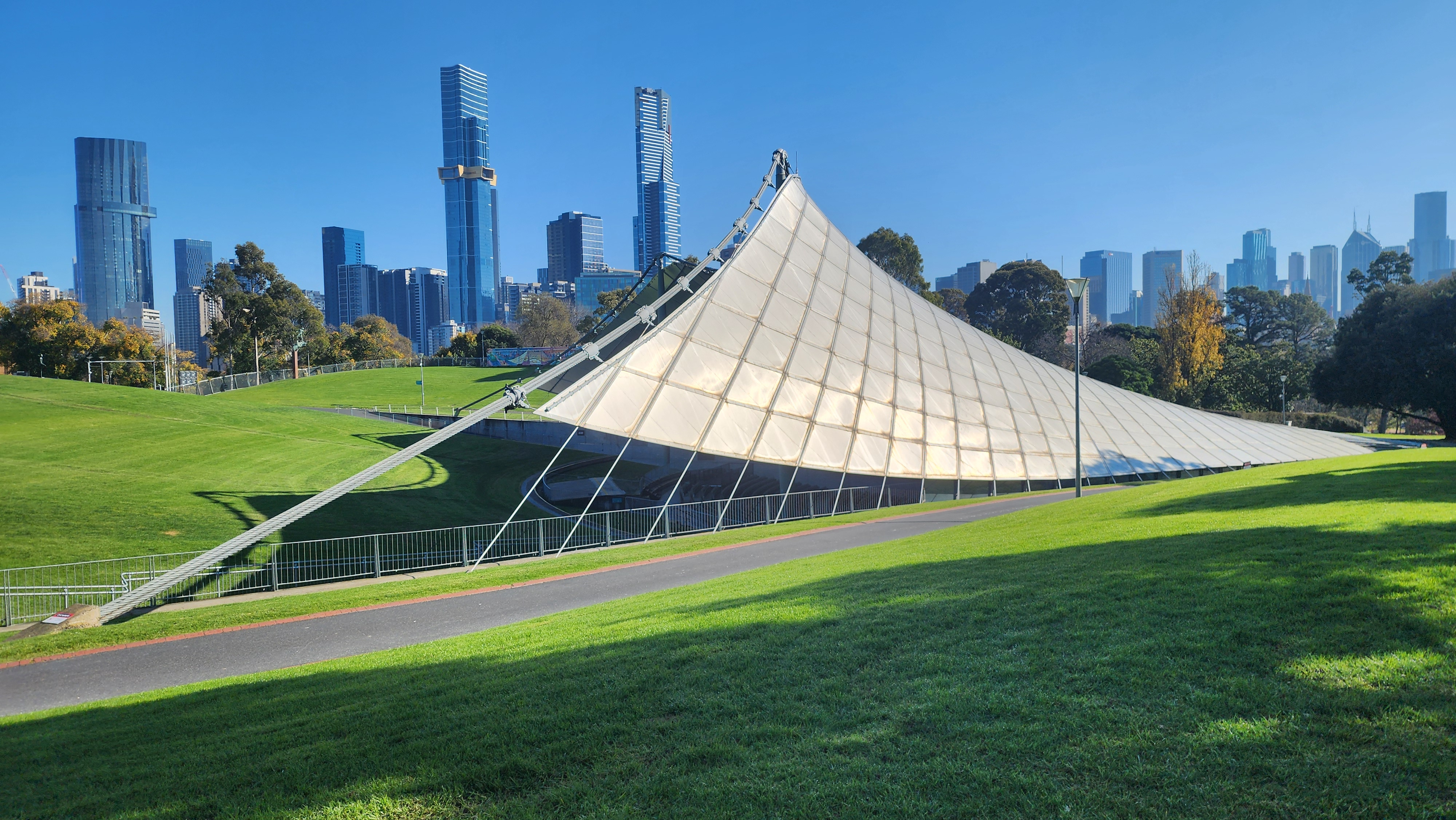
Sidney Myer Music Bowl with Melbourne skyline at the back

Unlike the Hollywood Bowl's concrete shell structure in Los Angeles which inspired it, the Sidney Myer Music Bowl combined a tensile structural system with a free-form roof. The structural design predates by nearly 10 years noted German architect and engineer Frei Otto and his experiments in using lightweight tensile and membrane structures. Otto's design of Munich's Olympic Park for the 1972 Olympics and the temporary West German pavilion at Expo 67 in Montreal, Canada, were heavily influenced by Patten's design of the Myer Music Bowl.

=== Heritage listing ===
The Sidney Myer Music Bowl is registered on the Victorian Heritage list for its cultural importance to Victoria, its architectural importance as the largest, purpose-built, permanent outdoor performance venue in Australia and its engineering experimentation in new forms of construction involving use of membranes and a tensile structural system.

=== Design awards ===
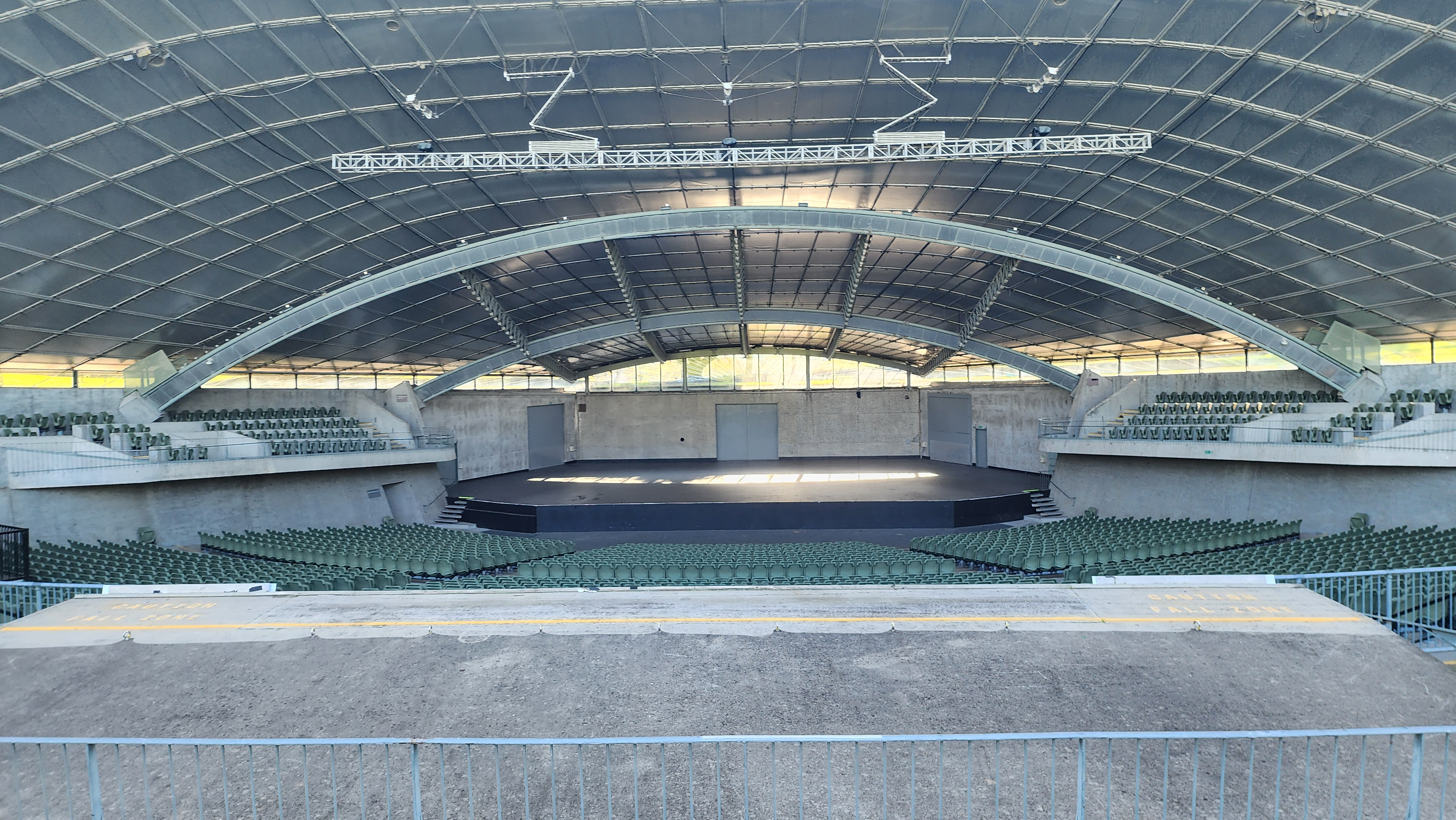

In 1959 the building was awarded the R.S. Reynolds Memorial Prize for "a significant work of architecture, in which the creation of which aluminium has been an important contributing factor", awarded annually by Reynolds Metals Company, U.S.A. The prize included an aluminium sculpture.

In 2002 the building refurbishment was awarded the Melbourne Prize. In 2009 the Sidney Myer Music Bowl was awarded the Enduring Architecture Award. Later in the same year the project won the 2009 National Award for Enduring Architecture.

=== Capacity ===
There is a fixed seating area which can hold 2,030 people. Behind this area are sloping lawns which can accommodate up to 10,000. The stage area is 27.4 metres wide by 19.5 metres deep (90 ft × 64 ft).

== Major events ==
The bowl holds major events including Vision Australia's Carols by Candlelight, held every year on Christmas Eve, televised each year by the Nine Network.

Past major events held at The Bowl include Piknic Electronik, Music from the Home Front and Midsummer Festival.

== Awards and nominations ==
=== Music Victoria Awards ===
The Music Victoria Awards are an annual awards night celebrating Victorian music. They commenced in 2006. Best Venue was introduced in 2016.

Year	Nominee / work	Award	Result	Ref.
2021	Sidney Myer Music Bowl	Best Venue (Over 500 Capacity)	Nominated	
2022	Sidney Myer Music Bowl	Best Large Venue (Metro)	Nominated	

== See also ==
- List of contemporary amphitheatres
- Make Poverty History Concert
