= Yuncken Freeman =

Australian architectural firm

Practice information
- Firm type: Architectural design; Urban planning; Interior design
- Key architects: Barry Patten; Roy Simpson
- Founders: Otto Albrecht Yuncken; John Freeman; Tom Freeman; William Balcombe Griffiths; Roy Simpson (1945)
- Founded: 1933
- Dissolved: Late 1980s
- Location: Melbourne (head office)

Significant works and honors
- Buildings: Sidney Myer Music Bowl (1959); Canberra Civic Centre (1965); Cardinal Knox Centre (1971); BHP House (1972)
- Design: La Trobe University masterplan
- Awards: Simpson: RAIA Gold Medal (1997)

Yuncken Freeman was an Australian architecture firm. Founded in Melbourne, Victoria in 1933, Yuncken Freeman grew steadily, particularly in the post-war economic boom to be a sizeable firm in Australia, with branch offices in Hong Kong as well as other parts of south-east Asia, until its dissolution during the late 1980s.

The firm gained early fame with the striking Sidney Myer Music Bowl, and then for major works in the 1960s and 1970s such as starkly Modernist office towers in Melbourne by Barry Patten including BHP House and the State Government Offices, and projects by Roy Simpson, such as the classically influenced ACT Law Courts, Fairlie apartments in South Yarra, and the low-slung Cardinal Knox Centre.

In 1997 Roy Simpson was awarded the Royal Australian Institute of Architects Gold Medal for his significant contribution to architecture.

== History ==
Yuncken Freeman was founded in 1933 when Otto (Rob) Yuncken and John Freeman together with Freeman's brother, Tom, and William Balcombe Griffiths, all left their positions at A & K Henderson to establish Yuncken, Freeman Brothers and Griffiths. The firm took on hospital work, and designed a series of houses for a wealthy clientele, usually in a refined Georgian mode, but also some more modernist in style.

In 1938 Roy Simpson started work with the firm, and in 1940 completed his studies at the School of Design in University of Melbourne, and was awarded the Robert Haddon travelling scholarship.

The operations of the firm were disrupted by World War II, with Rob Yuncken and Roy Simpson enlisted into service, providing planning and design services to the United States Army Corps of Engineers. After the war, Yuncken and Simpson returned to Melbourne only to find the members of the original group scattered. They reunited the practice, and Simpson was made a partner to create Yuncken, Freeman Brothers, Griffiths and Simpson. In 1947, Yuncken Freeman was appointed by the Government of Victoria to initiate an emergency housing project to provide accommodation for workers on various state projects, possibly due to the experience Simpson and Yuncken gained with the U.S. Army. The result was timber houses, delivered pre-cut and partially assembled, largely produced in England, and shipped to Australia, beginning in 1949. Fifty years later, many of these homes remained occupied.

Barry Patten and John Gates were admitted to the partnership in 1953 following the death of Rob Yuncken in 1951, by which time the firm was simply known as Yuncken Freeman, a name that was made official in 1963. By then Balcombe Griffiths and Roy Simpson were the sole survivors of the five original partners, and had been joined by John Yuncken, Rob's son, Robert Peck, Jamie Learmonth and others. Patten introduced the firm's international modernist architecture style, with work by the 1970s heavily influenced by work of Ludwig Mies van der Rohe, such as their own King Street offices, and especially BHP House, their largest project and Melbourne's tallest building. After this success, the recession of the mid-1970s hit Yuncken Freeman hard, sacking 15 architects, and the eight directors took a 20% pay cut. Patten told The Age: "The situation is very bad — there just isn't any work available. We have employed people for years and we are now finding it very difficult to keep them occupied. It is very worrying." In 1980, Balcombe Griffiths, Roy Simpson and John gates retired, and the firm was formally wound up in the late 1980s.

== Major architectural works ==
Completed	Project name	Location	Award	Notes
1958	Sidney Myer Music Bowl	Kings Domain, Melbourne	Maggie Edmond Enduring Architecture Award, 2009	
1959	Bruntisfield House	135 Walsh Street, South Yarra (City house for Mr and Mrs Simon Warrender)		
1961	Civic Square, Canberra	London Circuit, Canberra		
1961	Fairlie Apartments	Anderson Street, South Yarra		
1963	ACT Law Courts	London Circuit, Canberra		
1964	La Trobe University Masterplan	Bundoora		
1965	Canberra Theatre	London Circuit, Canberra		
1965	Royal Insurance Group Building (AON Centre)	430—444 Collins Street, Melbourne	Victorian Architecture Medal, 1967	
1968	Eagle Star Insurance Building	28 Grenfell Street, Adelaide		
1969	State Government Offices	Treasury Place and Macarthur Street, East Melbourne	Victorian Architecture Medal, 1970 (Victorian Bronze Medal for Excellence)	
1971	Cardinal Knox Centre	Albert Street, East Melbourne	Maggie Edmond Enduring Architecture Award, 2004	
1972	BHP House	140 William Street, Melbourne	Victorian Architecture Medal, 1975; Maggie Edmond Enduring Architecture Award, 2005; National Award for Enduring Architecture, 2005	
1972	Eagle House	473—481 Bourke Street, Melbourne	RAIA Award of Merit, 1972	
1976	Estates House	114—128 William Street, Melbourne		

== Gallery ==
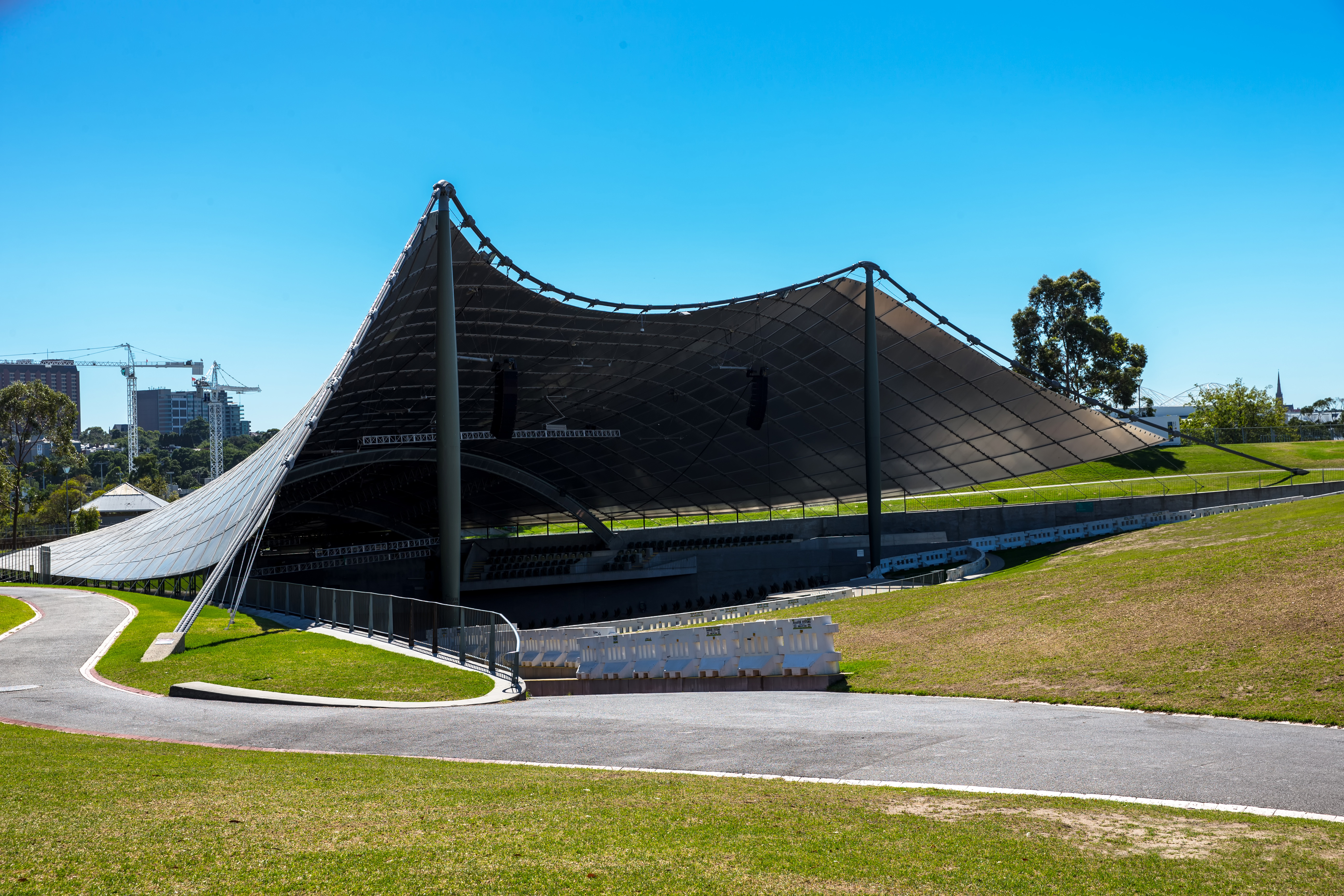
Sidney Myer Music Bowl

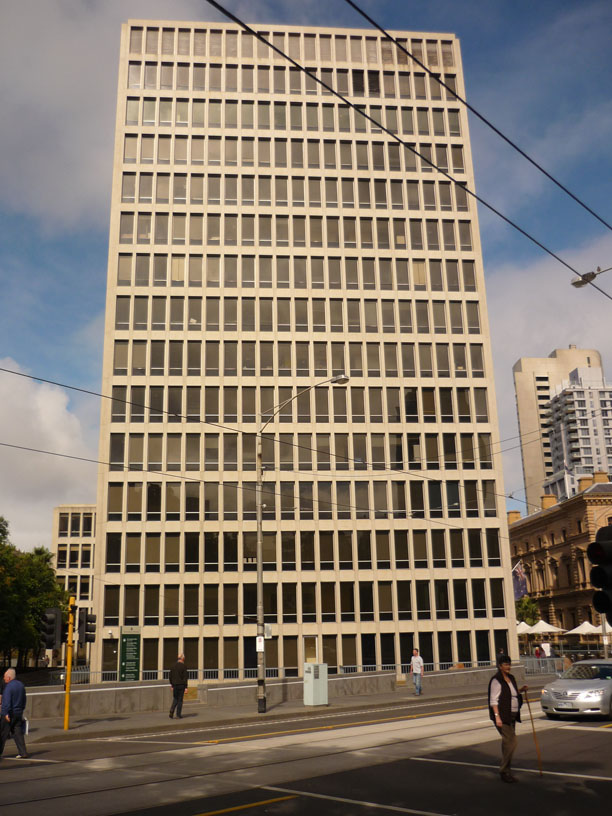
State Offices

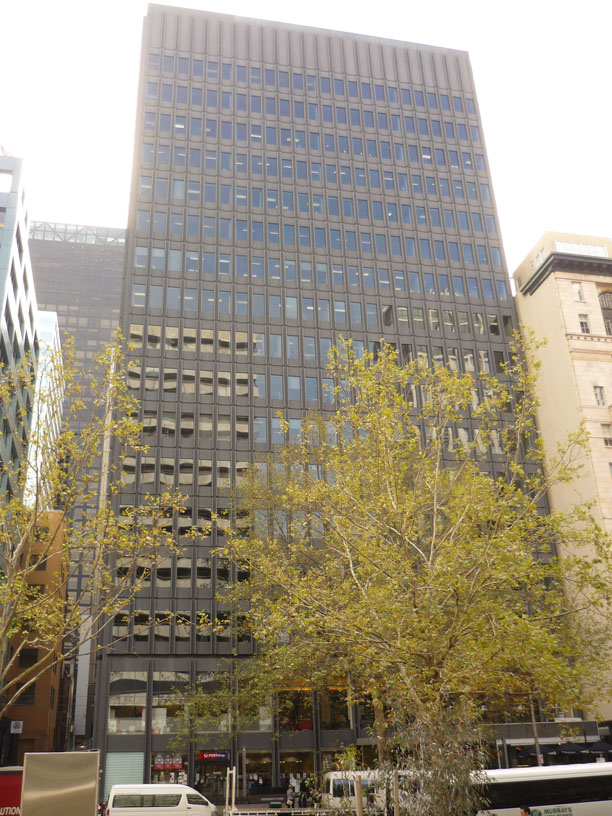
Royal Insurance Building

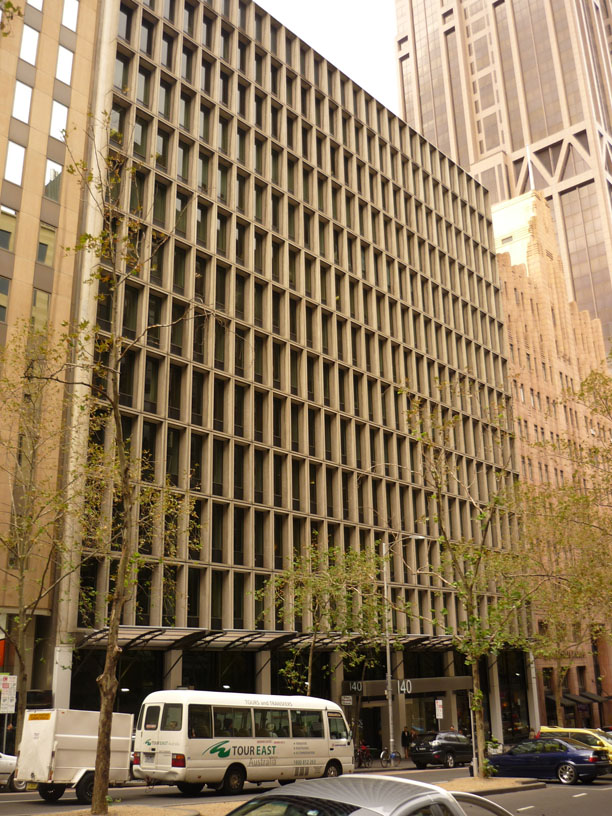
Scottish Amicable Life Assurance Building

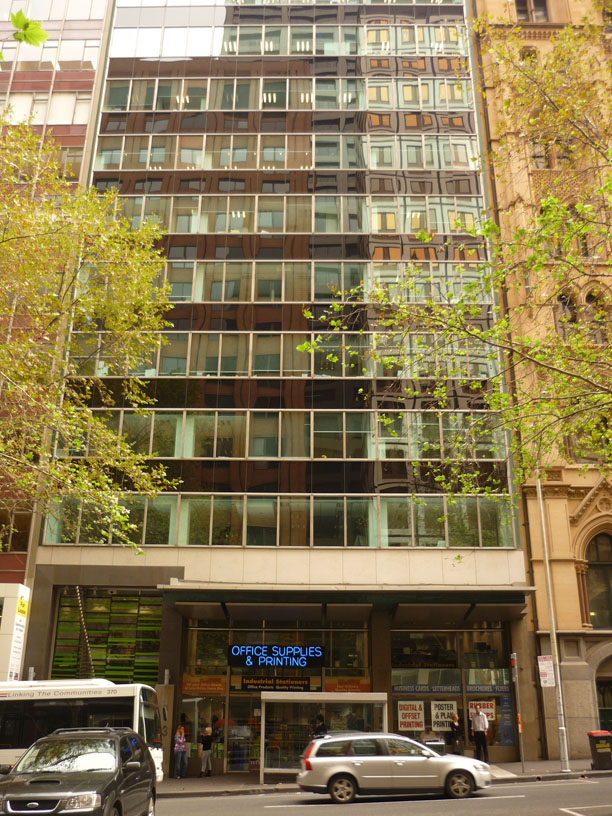
Norwich Union Insurance Building

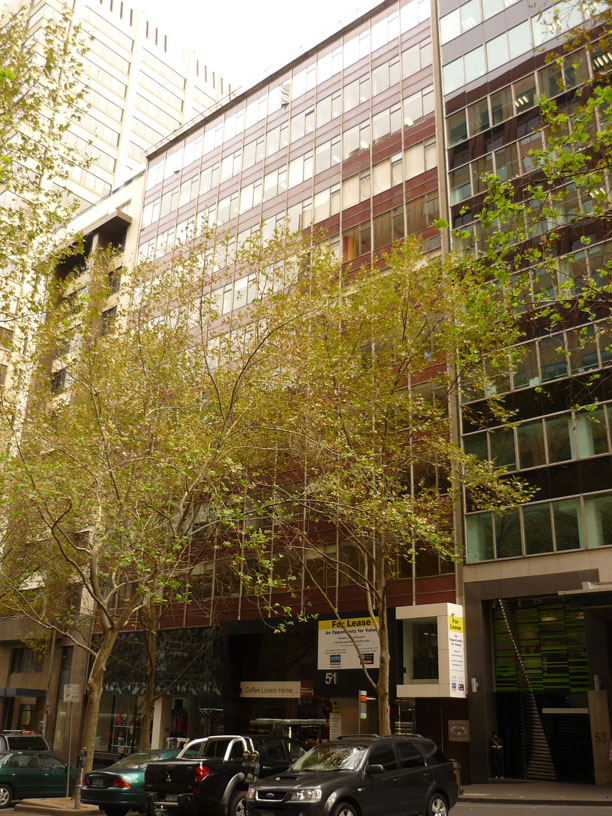
Canton Union Insurance Building

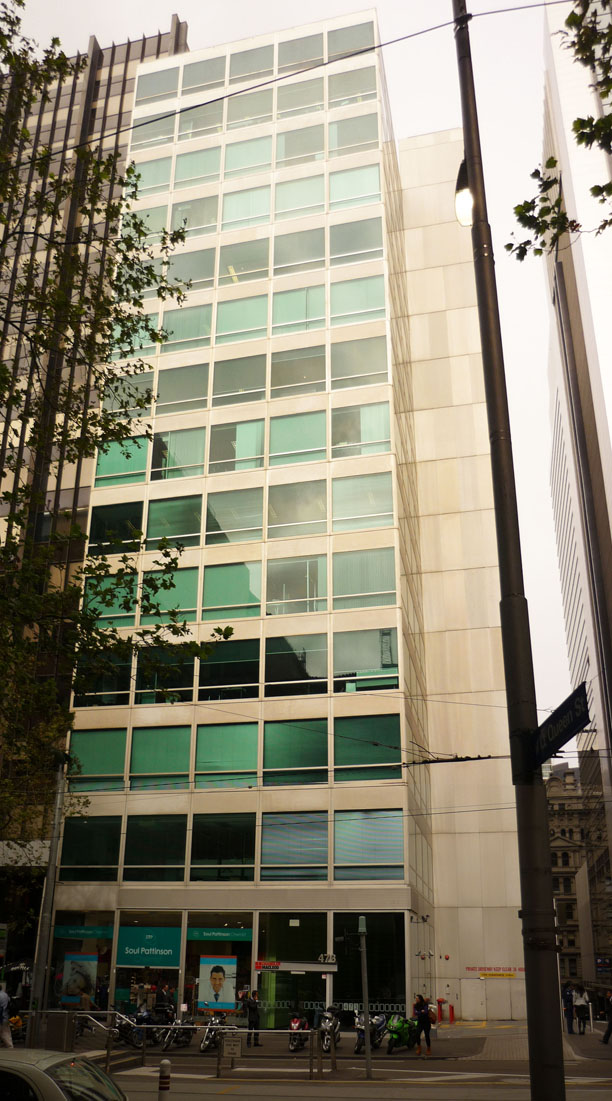
Eagle House

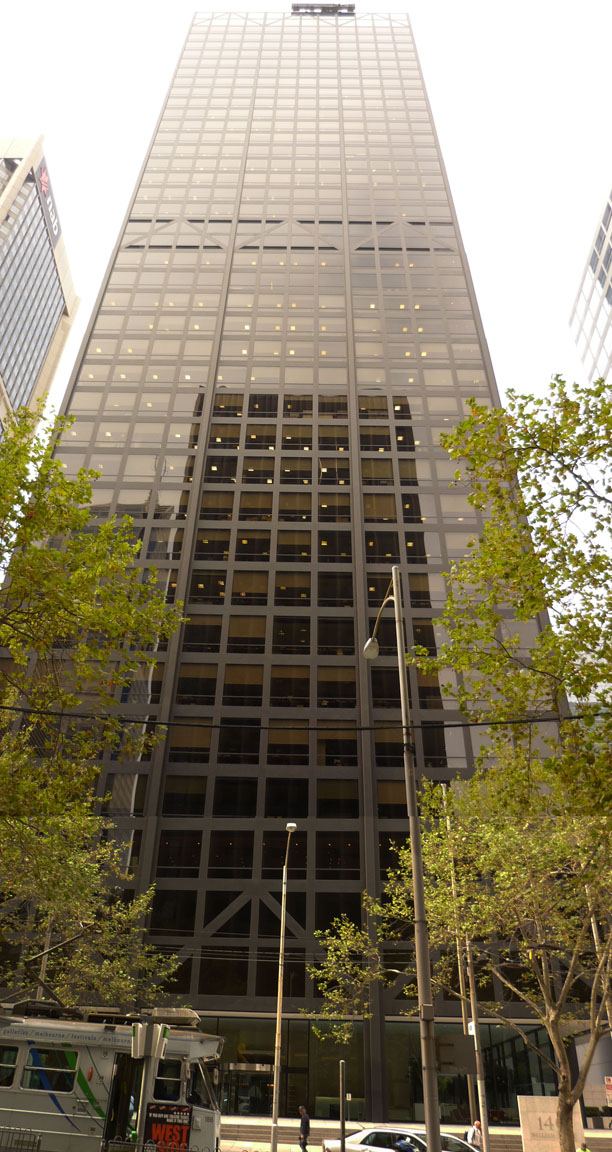
BHP Building

== See also ==
- Architecture of Australia
