= 140 William Street, Melbourne =

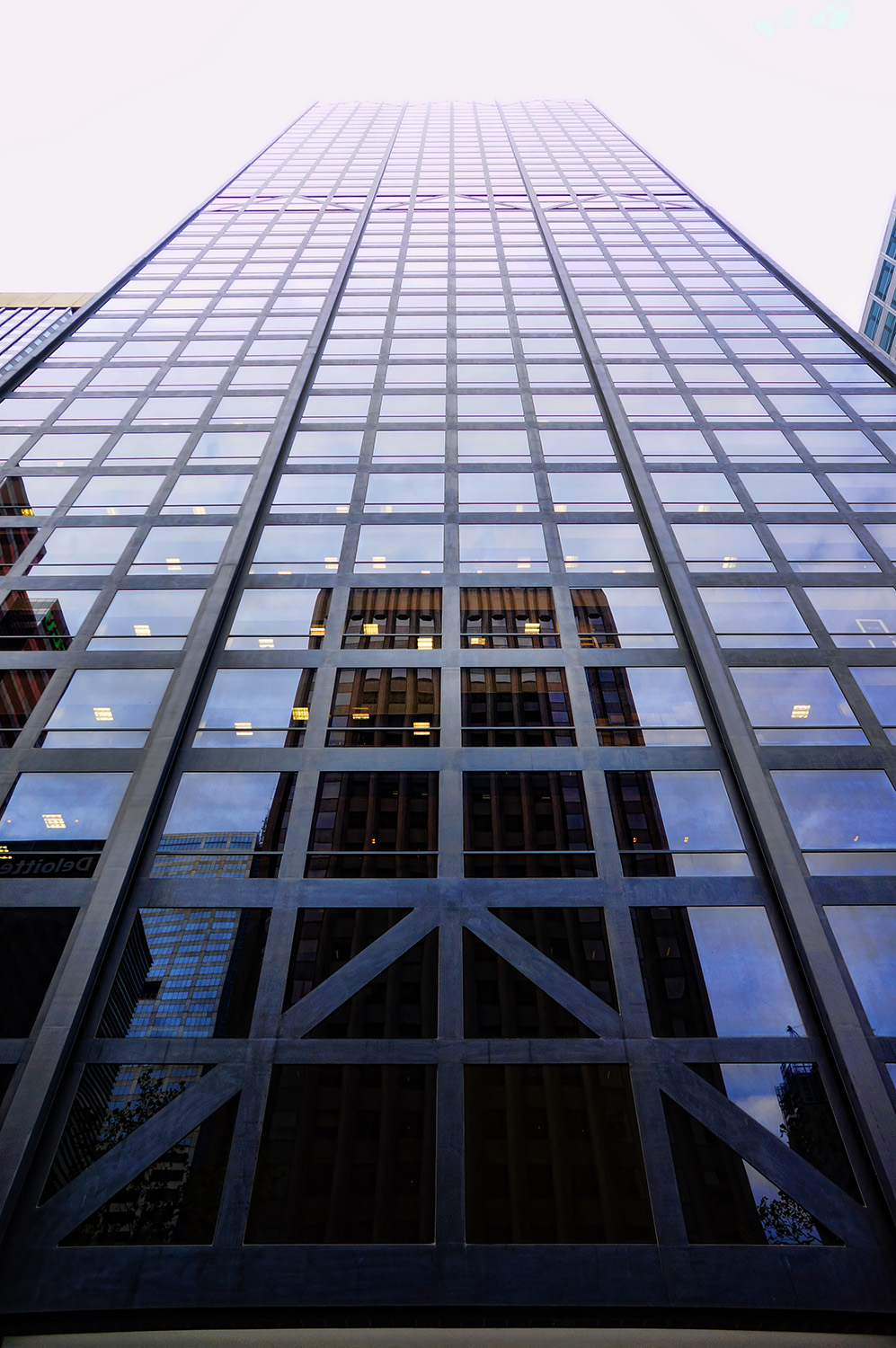
- Building façade from William Street

Record height
- Tallest in Melbourne from 1972 to 1975^{[I]}
- Preceded by: Marland House
- Surpassed by: Optus Centre

General information
- Location: 140 William Street, Melbourne, Australia
- Coordinates: 37.8158°S 144.9586°E
- Completed: 1972

Height
- Height: 152.5 metres (500 ft)

Technical details
- Floor count: 41

Design and construction
- Architect: Yuncken Freeman
- Engineer: Irwinconsult; Fazlur Rahman Khan

140 William Street (formerly BHP House) is a 41-storey, 152.5-metre-tall skyscraper located in the western end of the Melbourne central business district, Victoria, Australia. Constructed between 1969 and 1972, BHP House was designed by the architectural practice Yuncken Freeman, alongside the engineering consultancy Irwinconsult, with heavy influence from contemporary skyscrapers in Chicago. The local architects sought technical advice from Bangladeshi-American structural engineer Fazlur Rahman Khan, of renowned American architectural firm Skidmore, Owings & Merrill, spending ten weeks at its Chicago office in 1968. At the time of its completion, BHP House became Melbourne's first skyscraper, as defined by standard height measurements, and the second-tallest building in Australia. It remained Melbourne's tallest building until the completion of the Optus Centre in 1975. Additionally, it was the first office building in Australia to use a "total energy concept" – the generation of its own electricity using BHP natural gas. The name "BHP House" came from the building being the national headquarters of BHP. BHP House has been listed on the Victorian Heritage Register since 1998 for its architectural, historical and technological significance to the state of Victoria.

== History ==
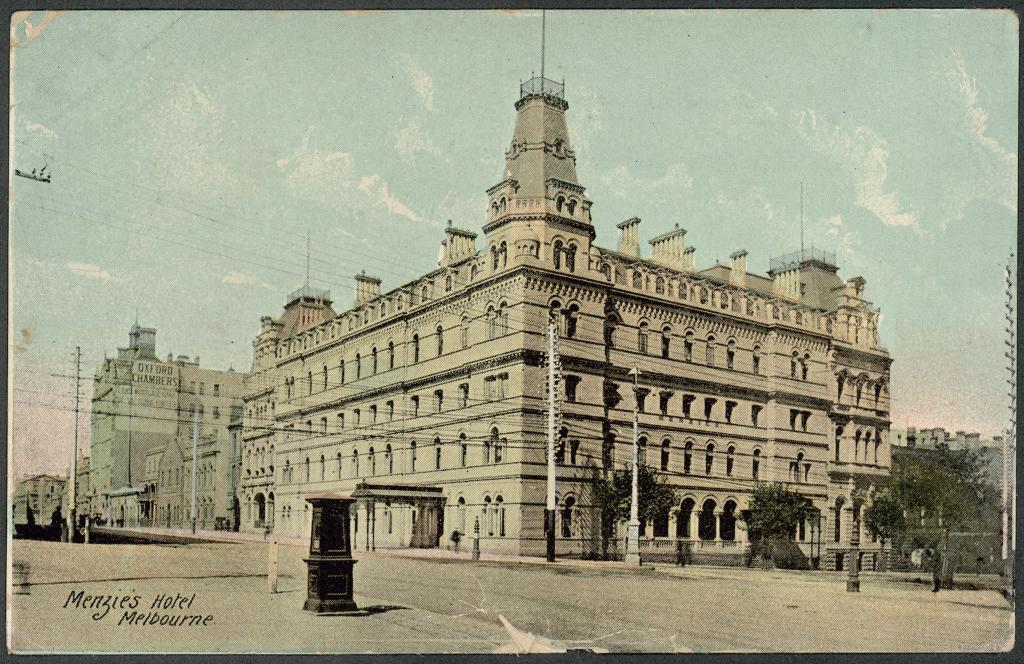
The Menzies Hotel constructed between 1867 and 1896 was Melbourne's first luxury hotel. Pictured in 1908 the building was demolished in 1969 to make way for BHP House.

BHP acquired a site at 498–502 Bourke Street in 1948 for £47,250 and earmarked it for demolition to construct a 12 storey office tower for its new headquarters. The company acquired the Menzies Hotel in 1964 and earmarked its demolition for an even taller tower. Demolition by Whelan the Wrecker proceeded in 1969. The Menzies was the city's first luxury hotel and, at the time of its demolition, remained second only to the Hotel Windsor in status as a grand Victorian hotel. Its demolition had a cultural impact and was seen as a major event in the modernisation of Melbourne. The event was painted by artist Ernest Marcuse and is part of the City of Melbourne Art and Heritage Collection.

The construction of BHP House commenced in 1969 and was finished by 1972, by which it was Melbourne's tallest building and its first skyscraper – a high-rise building defined as exceeding 150 metres (490 ft) in height – as well as Australia's second-tallest building behind Australia Square, Sydney. BHP House remained Melbourne's tallest building until the completion of the 153-metre-tall (502 ft) Optus Centre in 1975.

== Architecture ==
Designed in a modern style, BHP House took significant inspiration from contemporary skyscrapers in Chicago. Consisting of three dominant materials – steel, concrete and glass – the design was promoting the use of steel in Australian construction and sought to establish new national height standards for steel-framed structures. The building's expressed gridded structure was a clear break from the sheer curtain walls of the 1950s and 1960s, and like the pioneering skyscrapers of Mies van der Rohe, it was designed as a three dimensional sculptural monument, detached from the surrounding cityscape. In the architectural field, BHP House is regarded as one of the most notable projects by Yuncken Freeman Architects due to cutting edge techniques for an office building such as flush glazing, minimalist interiors and expressed structural bracing.

Yuncken Freeman carried out a series of experiments for the design proposals of BHP House in the construction processes of their own offices in 1970, located at 411–415 King Street, Melbourne. Under the advice of Fazlur Khan, a structural engineer from Skidmore, Owings & Merrill, the design revolves around four basic components to reinvent the tower as a "cantilever" and achieve the properties of a "giant stiff structural tube". The four components consist of a steel-framed flooring system, a steel-framed central core, a steel and glass façade, and steel trusses that connect the central core to the façade. Innovative techniques were employed to lay the foundations of the building – a concrete raft which was poured in a single continuous action. The weight of the floor structure was reduced by using open-web steel beams and a lightweight layer of concrete. Along with cap and belt trusses, this flooring system performed a stiffening effect and allowed structural loads to be transferred down through the central steel-framed core and the outer steel-framed façade, eradicating the need for internal columns and providing flexibility for internal spaces. The design of the building was also notable for employing the "total energy system", which allowed electrical generation using BHP natural gas. It was the first office building in Australia to utilise this technology. BHP House set the standard for many subsequent office buildings and led to the change of Melbourne town planning codes which were altered to cater for increased building heights and floor areas.

Measuring 41 floors and 152.5 metres in height, 140 William Street is tied as the 77th-tallest building in Melbourne as of November 2026.

== Heritage listing ==
BHP House has been listed on the Victorian Heritage Register (as number H1699) since 1998 for its significance to the state of Victoria based on the following three reasons:

- Architectural – 140 William Street is one of the most noteworthy building designs by the Melbourne firm Yuncken Freeman.
- Technological – its innovative structural application of steel and concrete, leading to open floor plates that are now a standard feature of high rise office buildings.
- Historical – the building signifies changes in Melbourne's CBD as it transformed into a major corporate centre.

== Gallery ==
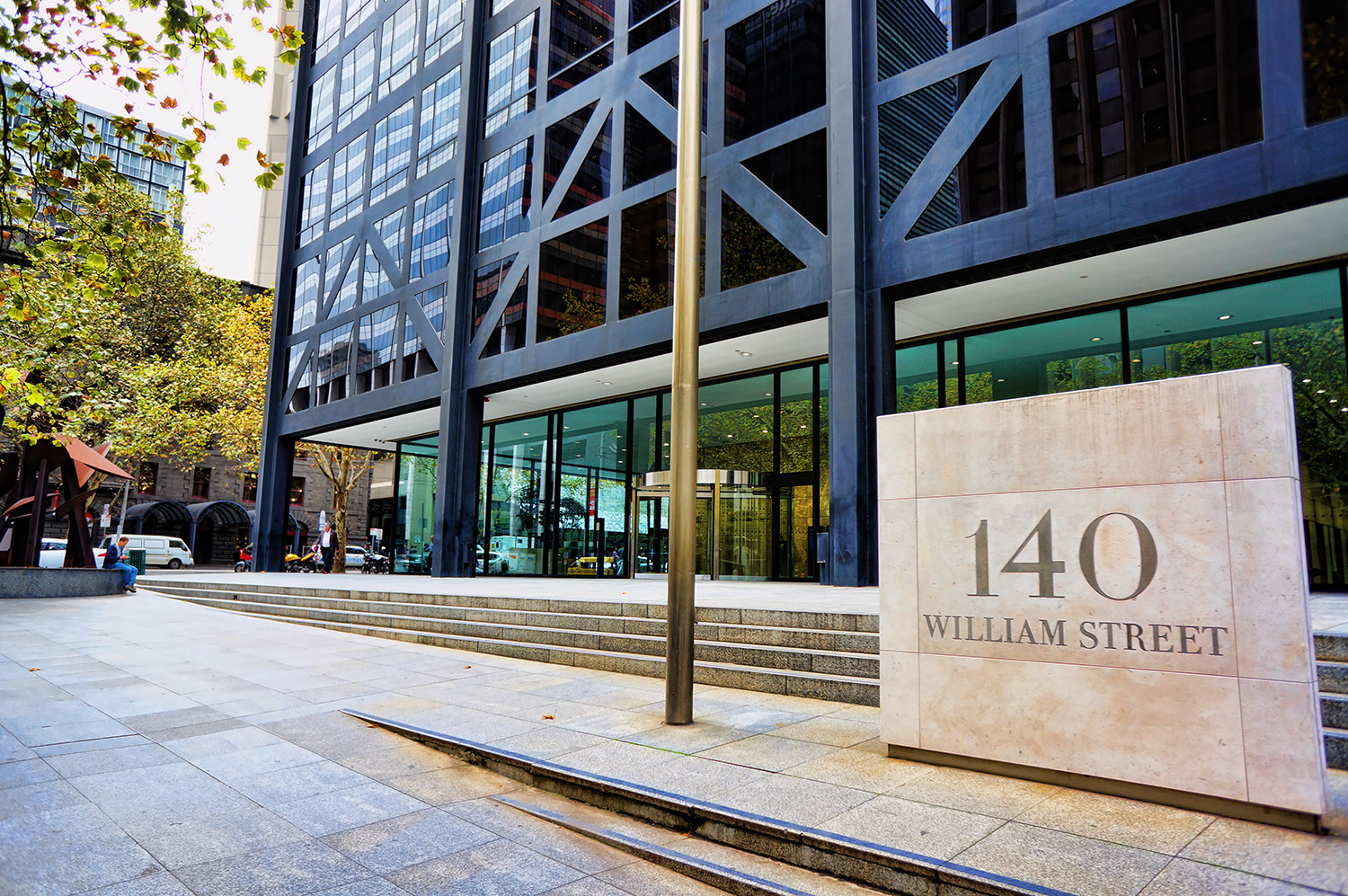
Building plaza and entrance from William Street

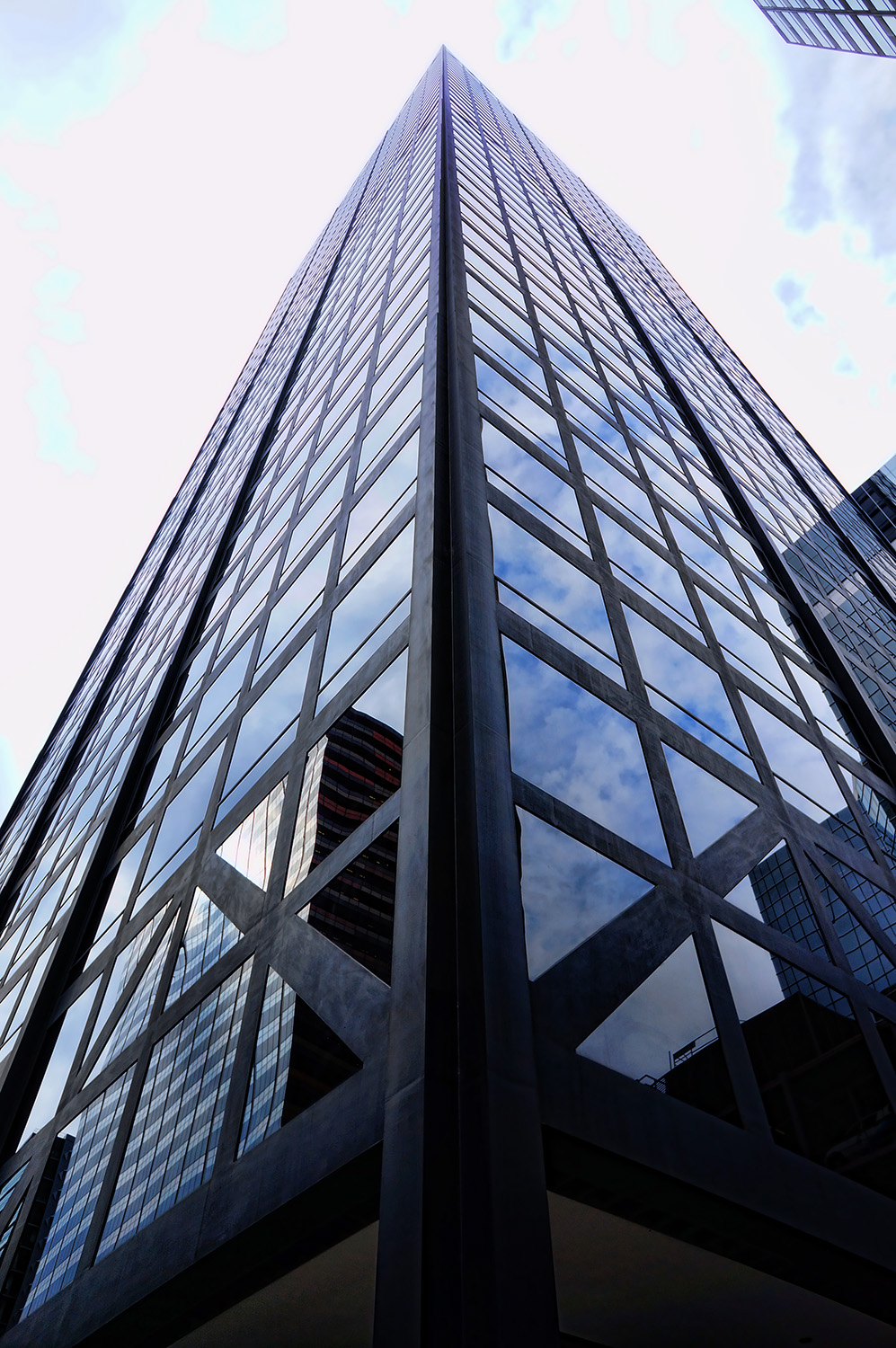
Building façade from corner

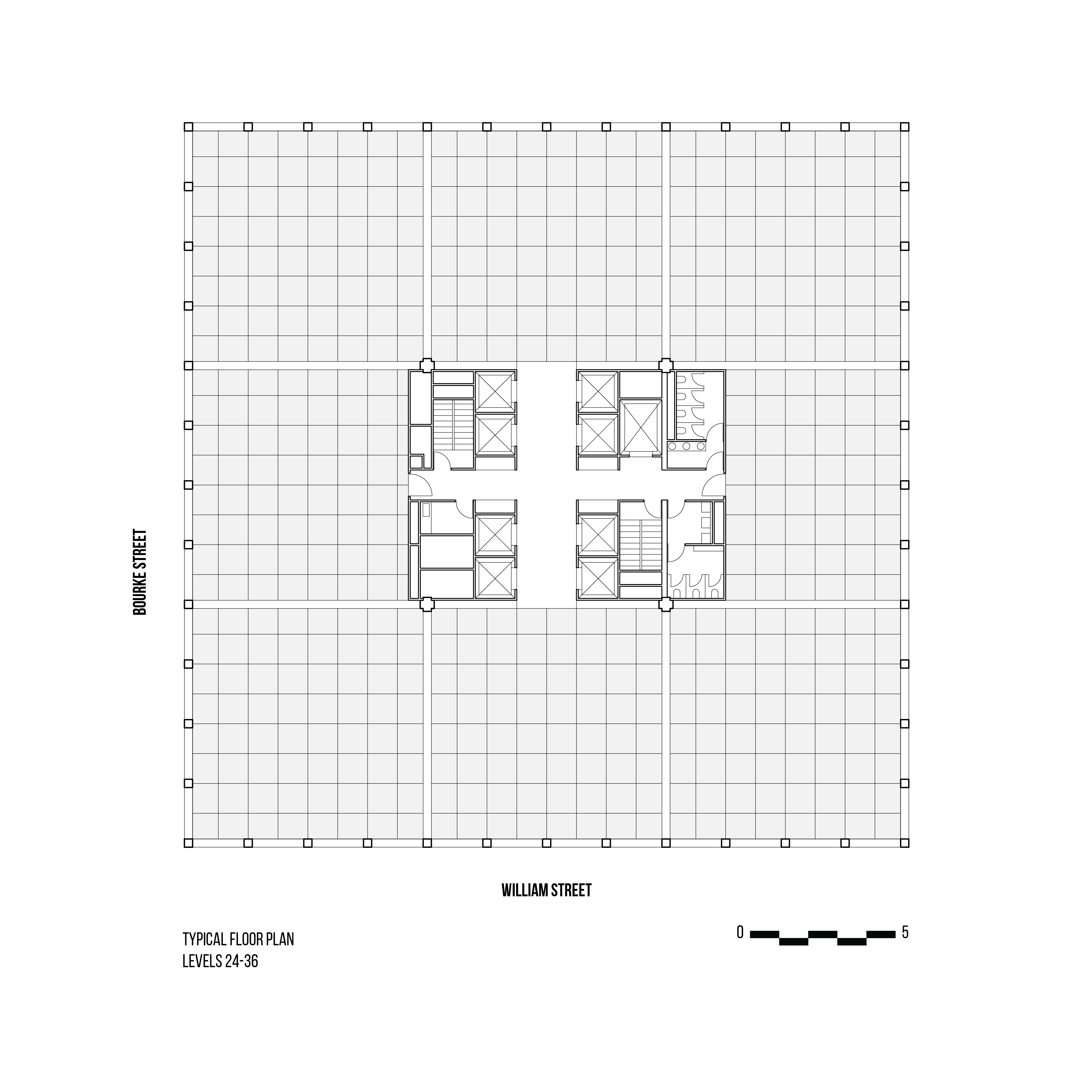
Typical floor plan

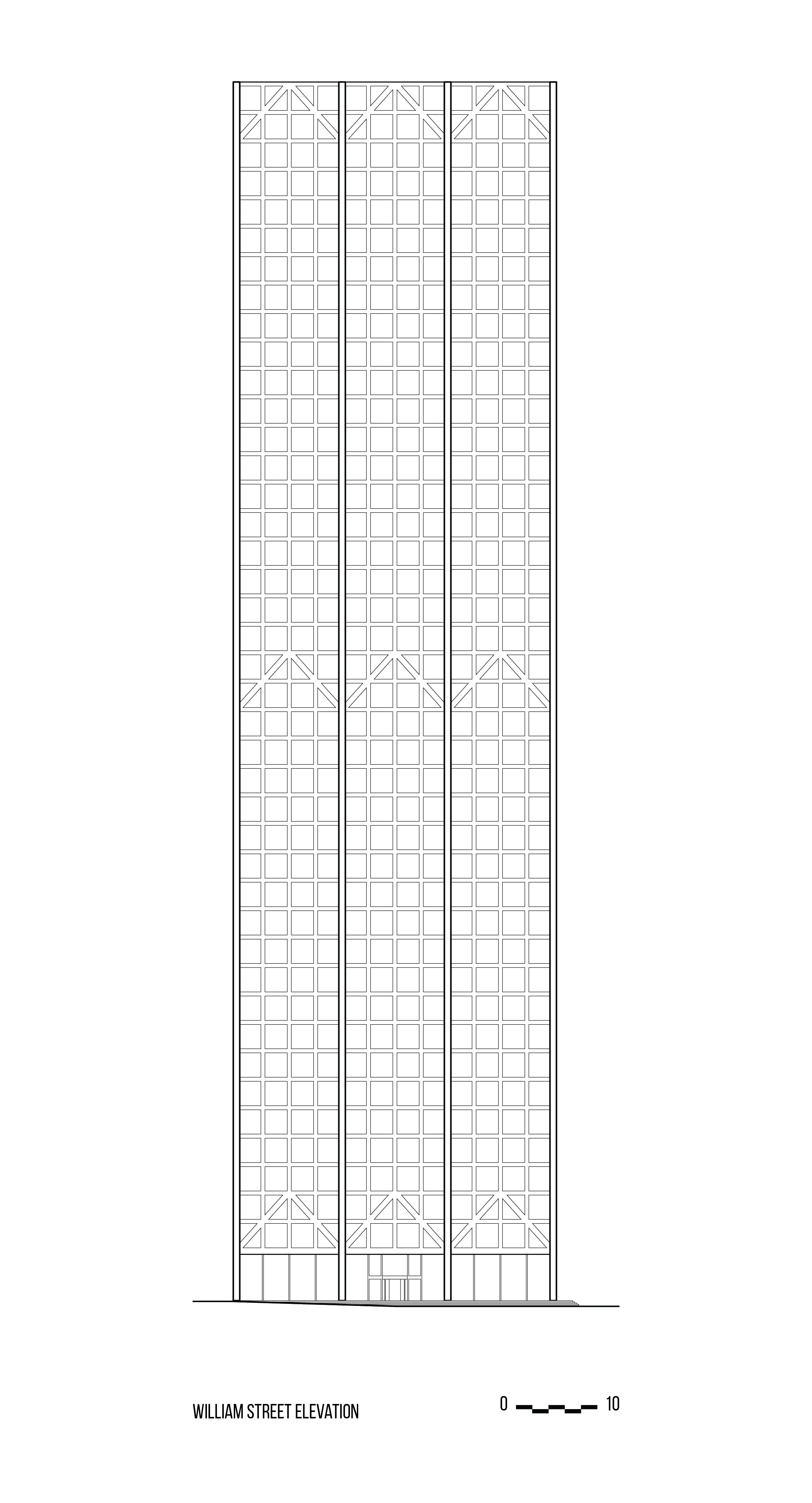
William Street elevation

== Awards ==
- National Award for Enduring Architecture, 2005
- Maggie Edmond Enduring Architecture Award, 2005
- Bronze Medal, 1975 (Victoria Chapter AIA)
- Award of Merit, 1973 (Victoria Chapter AIA)
