= AMP Square =

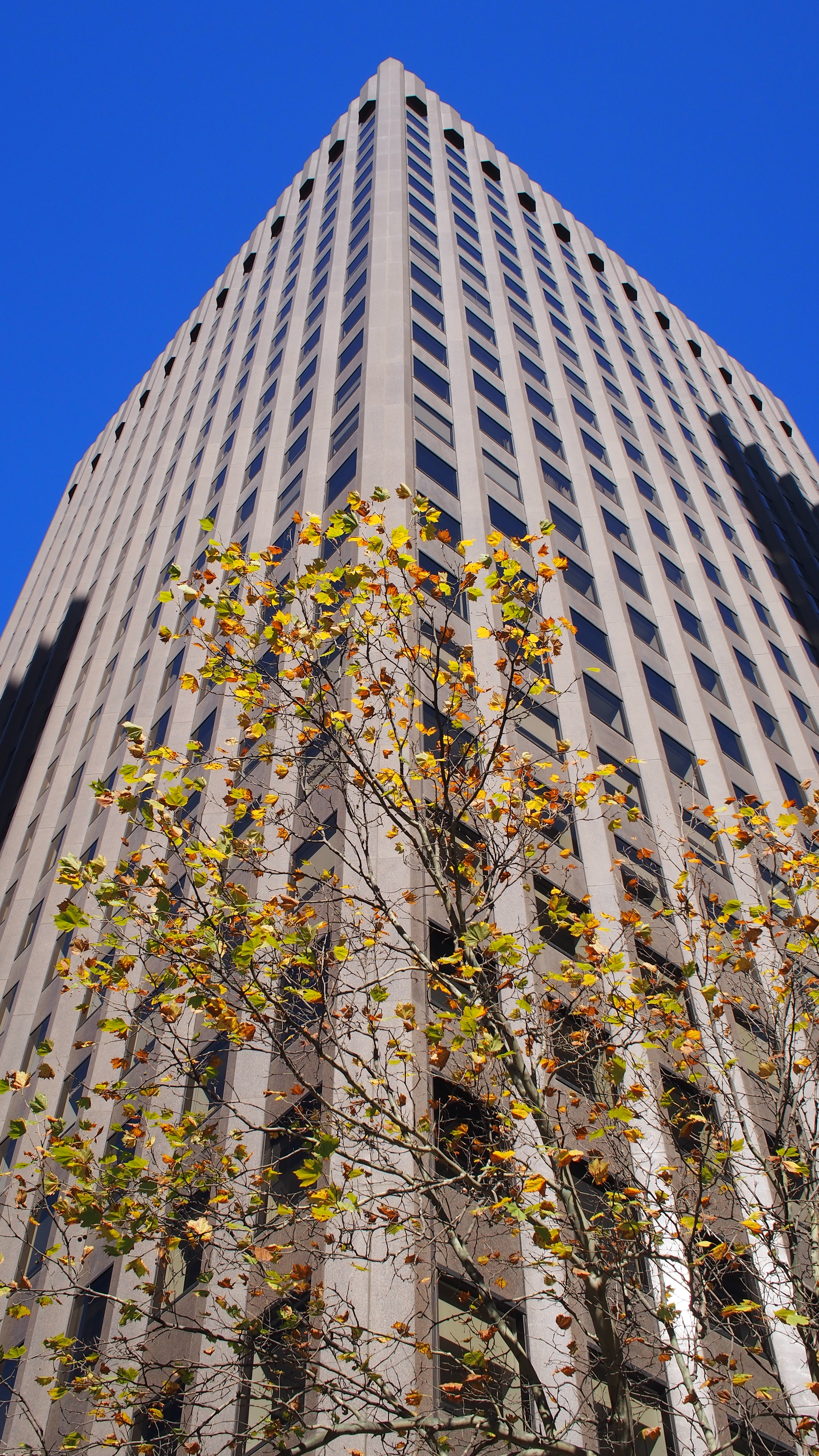

General information
- Type: Office tower
- Architectural style: International Style, Brutalist, Early Modernist
- Location: 527-555 Bourke Street, Melbourne, Australia
- Coordinates: 37°48′57.8″S 144°57′27.9″E
- Completed: 1969
- Client: Australian Mutual Provident Society

Height
- Height: 133 m (436 ft)

Technical details
- Floor count: 26
- Floor area: 7,743 m^{2} (83,340 sq ft)

Design and construction
- Architects: Skidmore Owings & Merrill Bates Smart & McCutcheon

AMP Square is a skyscraper in Melbourne, Australia, located on the corner of Bourke and William streets in the Melbourne central business district. Designed by US firm Skidmore, Owings & Merrill with local firm Bates Smart McCutcheon, and completed in 1969, it was briefly the tallest in the city, and is noted for its use of solid sculpted forms bringing a sense of monumentality to tall buildings.

== Site History ==
The site of the AMP building was originally one of two large sites on William Street between Collins and Bourke streets granted to the Anglican Church; the southern block facing Collins Street was the location of the first Anglican church built in 1837, the Pioneer Church, which was soon replaced by St James Old Cathedral, largely completed by 1842. 60 years later, surrounded by the growing town, the Cathedral narrowly escaped demolition and was relocated up the road to Batman Street, near Flagstaff Gardens in West Melbourne in 1913. The block facing Bourke Street became home to the Cathedral's school, which was replaced in 1889 by the large block-long St James' Building, combining offices and warehouses. Nearby Church Street, Church Lane, and St James Lane all attest to the relocated cathedral.

== Development ==
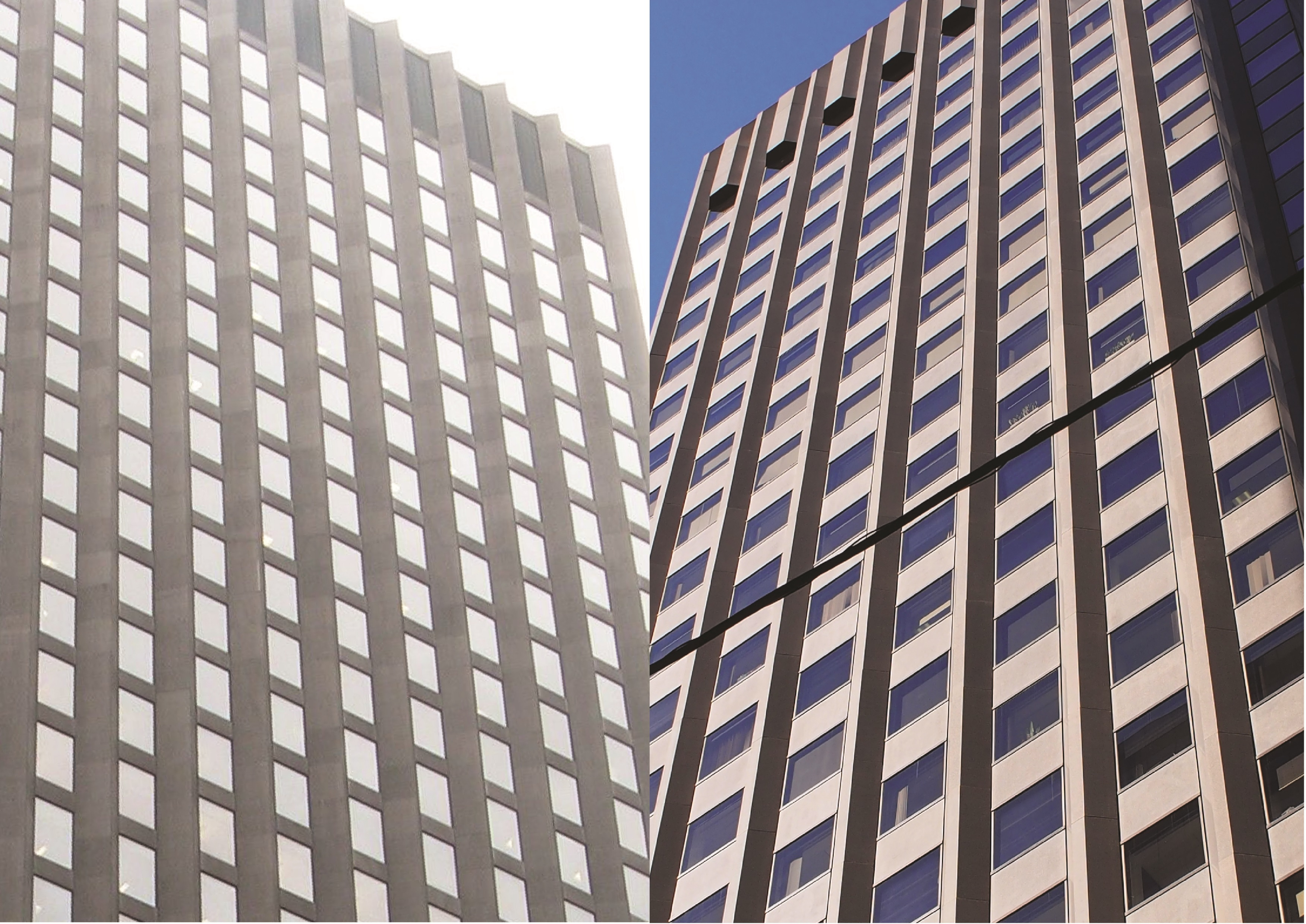
CBS Building and AMP Tower facades

With the surge of growth seen in major western cities emerging after the end of World War II, a demand for large scale high-rise office accommodation using modern technologies developed.

“On the suggestion of Sir Robert Law-Smith, an influential member of the Victorian board of AMP”, it was agreed upon that AMP's new development fronting Bourke and William Streets in Melbourne would be designed by the San Francisco office of architects Skidmore, Owings & Merrill (SOM). SOM required an Australian partner for the project, approaching Osborn McCutcheon of the Australian architectural firm Bates, Smart McCutcheon, responsible for designing prior AMP commercial office complexes including the 1930 AMP building on the corner of Collins and Market streets. After first resisting to co-operate, McCutcheon agreed to travel to San Francisco to meet with the partners at SOM and arrange a joint venture on the AMP project. It was decided that SOM would be responsible for the development and design of the project, with all the documentation past the design development stage handled by Bates Smart McCutcheon including the supervision of the construction. The key architects driving the project at Skidmore, Owings & Merrill were Edward Charles Bassett, Richard Foster, and Mark Goldstein whom were responsible for signature design features in project such as the angled colonnades on the L-shaped St James building, and Helmut Jacoby whom was responsible for the perspective drawings.

In 2013 the development underwent a major transformation by architecture firm Metier3, which saw much of the plaza area infilled, and single level retail spaces added to the base of the tower.

== Design ==
The AMP Square comprises two buildings and a plaza between, the AMP Tower, the L-shaped St James Building wrapping around two sides and defining the St James Plaza between. It was regarded as a "significant Melbourne island site... [known] to be the red, pre-cast brutalist building" by Andrew Norbury, of architecture firm Metier3,

=== The Tower ===
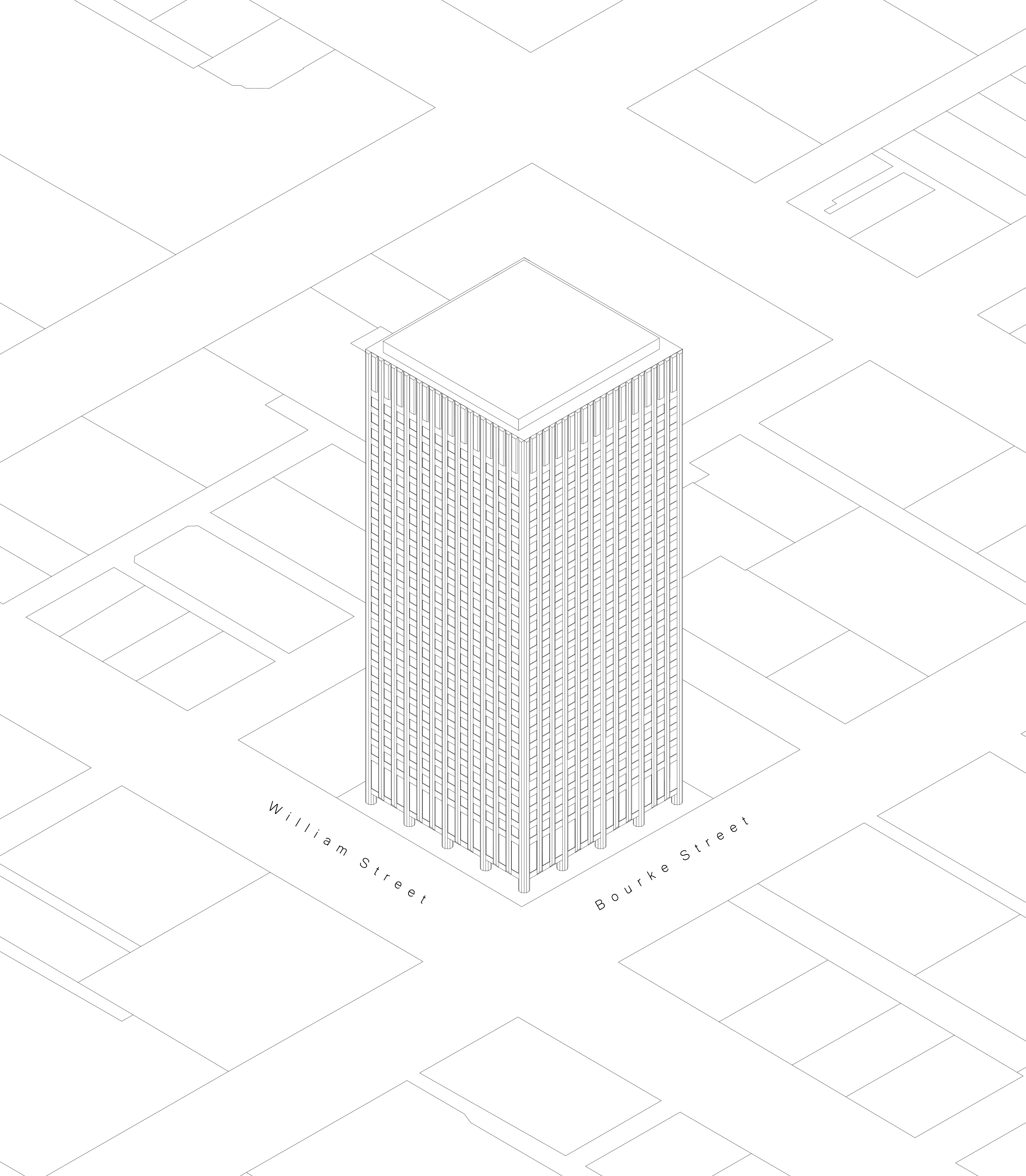
AMP Tower Axonometric Drawing

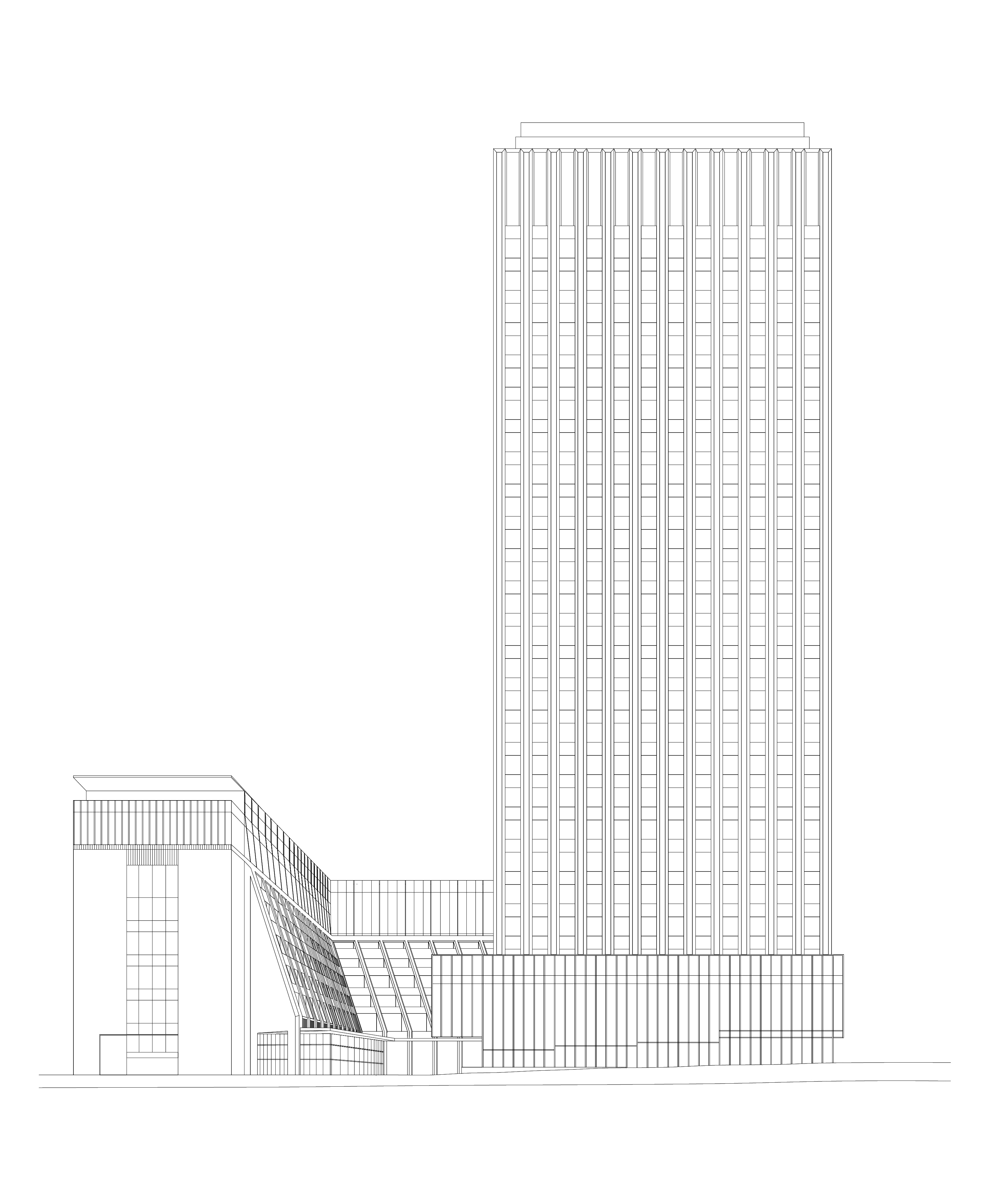
AMP Square William Street elevation

The AMP Tower is located on the North-Eastern corner of the AMP Square site sitting on the William Street-Bourke Street intersection. This location places it in a precinct of significant post-war commercial office skyscrapers from the same era which includes 140 William Street opposite and the adjoining Estates House at 114-128 William Street, both by Yuncken Freeman. This collection has been described as a heritage precinct at the end of Bourke Street: though it does not have an office designation as such., all three are now heritage listed. The collection of Modernist towers was once even larger, with the 1958 Shell Corner, also by SOM, once occupying the north west corner of the intersection (dem 1990).

The AMP Tower is clearly inspired by the New York CBS Building completed in 1965 and designed by Eero Saarinen, a Finnish-American architect and industrial designer, for whom Edward Bassett had previously worked. The AMP Tower also has similarities in expression with the Bank of America (now 555 California Street) in San Francisco, designed by the local office of SOM. Taking the minimalist sculptural approach to the early modernist design of large scale commercial projects, the twenty six-storey AMP Tower is constructed of a concrete encased structure of steel-framework. The tower features chamfered vertical ribs of pre-cast panels of reconstructed polished brown granite, also used for the spandrel panels between the brown tinted glass windows.

=== St James Building and Plaza ===
The six storey, low-rise L-shaped St James Building frames the plaza on the southern and western edges. The public plaza is an expression of the plot ratio system, with open space provided in return for greater height. The St James Building façades area also defined by ribs, clad in the same polished re-constructed brown granite as the AMP Tower, but which angle both out and to one side at 45 degrees, ending as the supports for with arcades surrounding the plaza. The façade and the broad protruding colonnades of the St James Building share the same minimalistic sculptural language and qualities of the ribbing of the AMP Tower, while the abstract geometric patterns generated by the angled colonnades contrast against the straight vertical lines of tower, creating a combination of complementing and juxtaposing structures whose features “dominate and give a dynamic life to the design”.

Much of this sculptural quality was lost in the 2013 redevelopment, with the infilling of the arcade to create larger retail spaces, and moving the windows between the ribs of the St James Building forward.

=== The Sculpture ===
The “russet tones and muscular masonry forms” of the two granite clad buildings were complemented by the 'knotted' corten steel sculpture, Awakening, by internationally recognised artist Clement Meadmore. Meadmore, who had begun his career in Melbourne and relocated to New York in 1963, was commissioned in 1968 by the Australian Mutual Provident Society for the St James Plaza as a foil to the angular lines of the architecture. The original Plaza was kept almost bare in a deliberate attempt to maintain the minimalist styling, with the arcades hidden from sight by the deep recess of the protruding, angled colonnades of the St James Building. The plaza redevelopment of 2013 saw the sculpture removed, and relocated to the TarraWarra Museum of Art in Healesville.

== Legacy ==
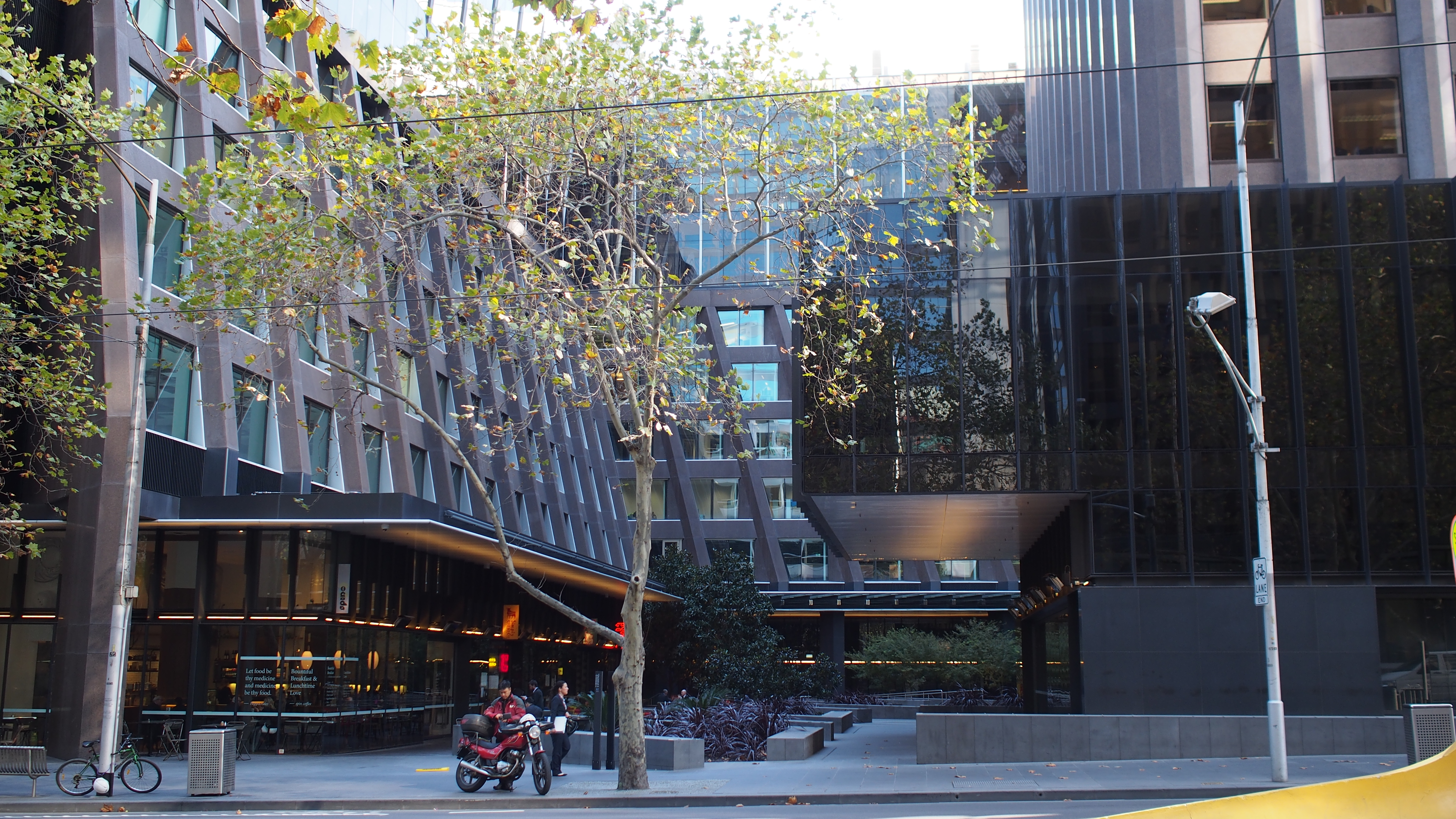
AMP Square from William Street

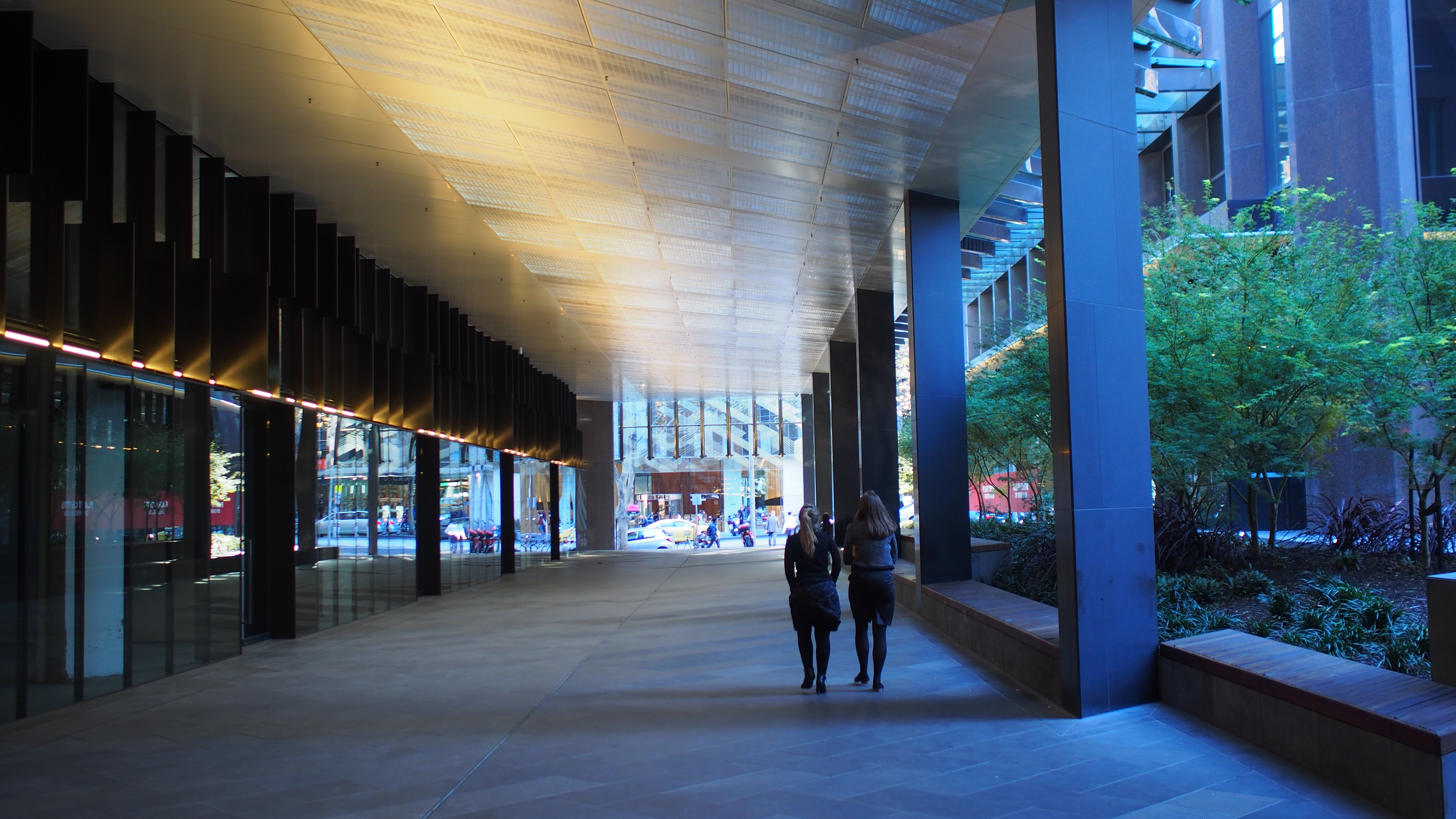
AMP Square Plaza

The scale of the AMP Square project indicated the power large corporations had to consolidate land in the early 1960s, and the end of the nineteenth century city. AMP Square defines itself from preceding projects which used sheer curtain glass walls, such as Orica House by Bates Smart McCutcheon, by taking the approach of heavy massing, also seen in the slightly earlier 1966 Victorian Government States Offices also by Yuncken Freeman.

The square footprint of the AMP Tower set back from the corner and in its own open plaza is an expression of the “tower as temple” model, which would be used again in the BHP Building on the opposite corner in 1972, with the open space flowing under the tower's edges. Combined with the public realm of the St James Plaza these open spaces challenged the density of the city grid, a testament to an attempt at a new sui generis for commercial projects at a grand scale.
