= St James Old Cathedral =

Coordinates: 37.8100°S 144.9523°E

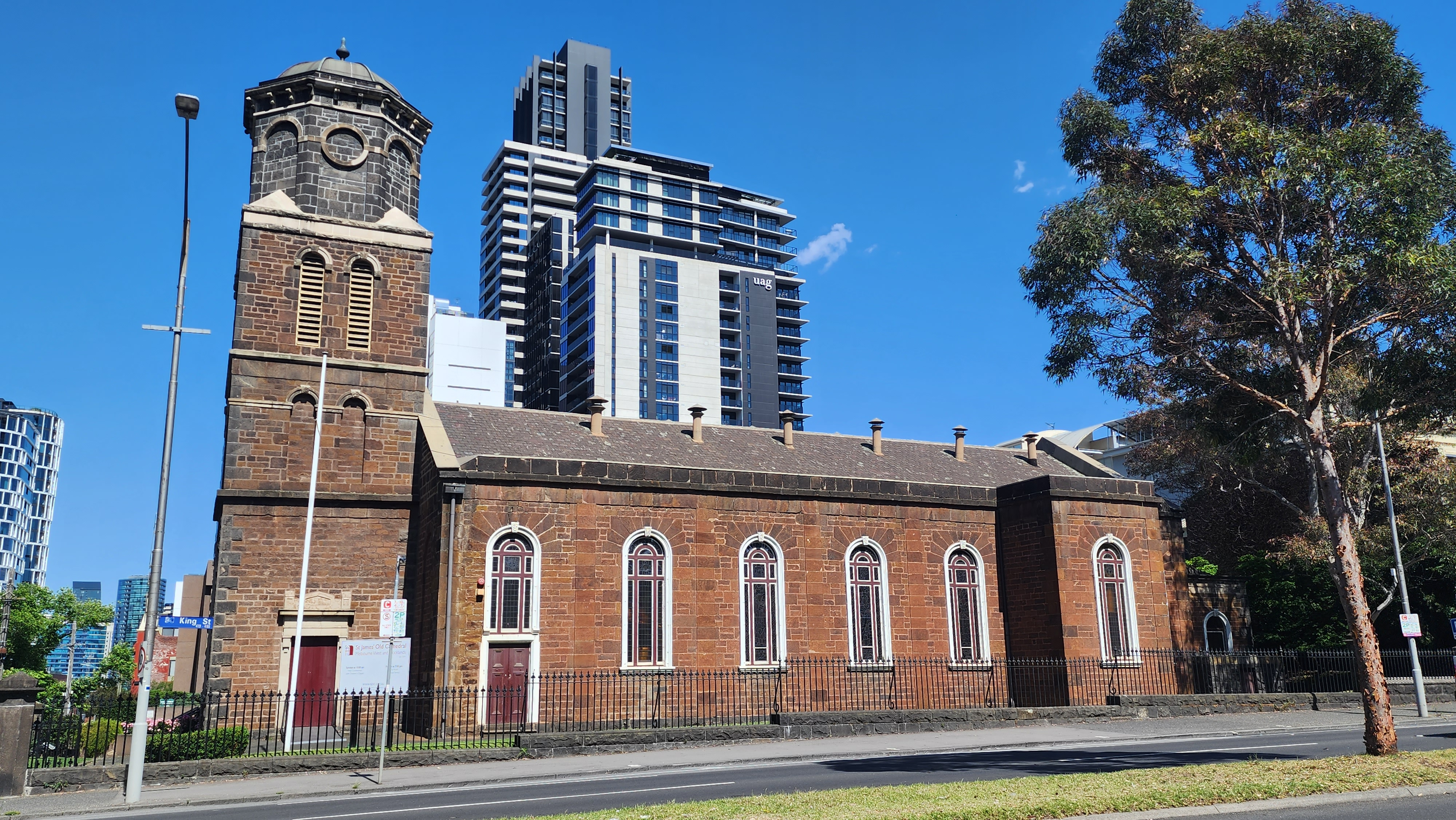
- St James Old Cathedral
- Location: Cnr King St &, Batman St, West Melbourne
- Country: Australia
- Denomination: Anglican Church of Australia

History
- Founded: 1839
- Dedicated: 1847

St James Old Cathedral, an Anglican church, is the oldest church in Melbourne, Australia, albeit not on its original site. It is one of the relatively few buildings in the central city which predate the Victorian gold rush of 1851. The building was dismantled and relocated in 1914 to a corner site of King Street and Batman Street in West Melbourne.

The parish is led by the Reverend Canon Matthew Williams. The Senior Associate Minister is the Reverend Mike Raiter, who is also director of the Centre for Biblical Preaching. The Assistant Curate is The Reverend Jessica Naylor-Tatterson.

More recently, the church has begun serving as the chapel for Haileybury College's City Campus.

The building is listed on the Victorian Heritage Register.

== History ==
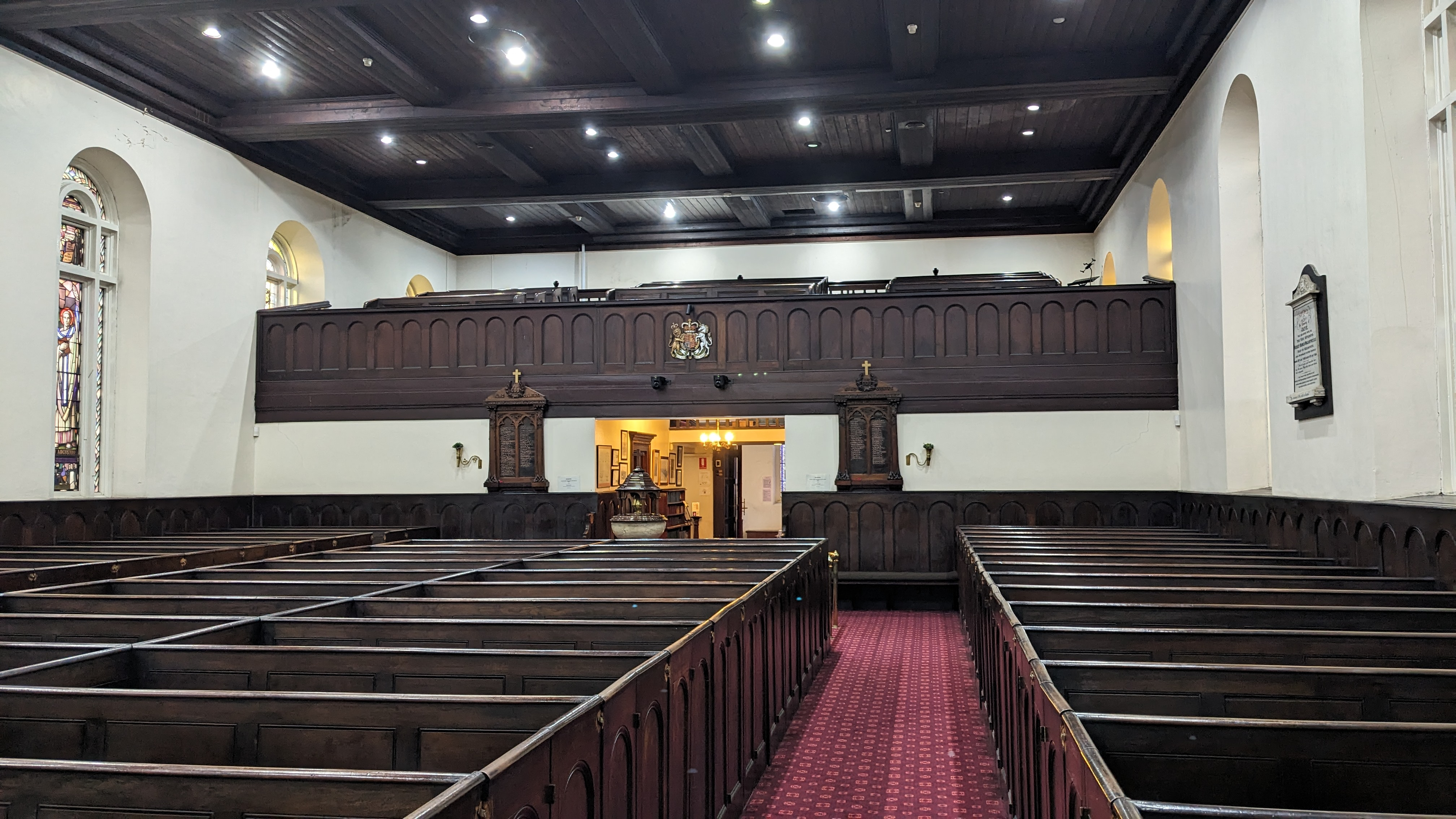
Contemporary interior of the Cathedral in July 2023

Melbourne's first substantial church was the 'Pioneer Church', a simple wooden structure used for both Anglican and Presbyterian services and as a school, which stood on the corner of William and Little Collins streets.

The foundation stone for St James was laid on 9 November 1839 by Charles La Trobe, the superintendent of the Port Phillip District (now the state of Victoria), in what was then still part of New South Wales. Melbourne was then only four years old and the church was one of the first substantial buildings to be built in the town. The church was designed by the town surveyor, Robert Russell, and built by George Beaver. One of the founders of Melbourne, John Batman, was among the subscribers who paid for the church's construction. The unfinished building was opened for worship on 2 October 1842, and it was finally completed in 1847. In 1848 Melbourne became an Anglican diocese and St James' became the cathedral church of the first Bishop of Melbourne, Charles Perry who appointed Hussey Burgh Macartney as the inaugural Dean. Macartney's wife, Jane Macartney (Hardman) and Frances Perry, wife of the Bishop, established and managed various charitable institutions in Melbourne. St James served as Melbourne's Anglican cathedral until St Paul's Cathedral was consecrated in 1891.

=== Relocation ===
The church originally stood near the corner of Collins Street and William Street in what was the centre of the town in the 1840s, at what is now the western end of the business district. There is still a small street called St James Lane, which ran adjacent to the church's school on the next block to the north. In May 1913 leaks and cracks led to an inspection by architect Thomas Watts which determined that the structure was unsafe and had to be closed. With rising land values and a declining congregation, the possibility of re-erecting rather than demolishing was proposed, and a site not very far away on the corner of King Street and Batman Street opposite the Flagstaff Gardens was chosen. The move was overseen by John Stevens Gawler, a Melbourne architect who was largely responsible for establishing the School of Architecture at the University of Melbourne, and it was reopened on Sunday April 19, 1914. Essentially only the exterior stonework and the timber work was saved, and the church was not rebuilt precisely the same; there were also a number of minor internal changes, reorientation from east west to north south, and changes to the tower - the third stage of the tower was made square to match the base rather than octagonal to match to the top section, both square stages have two arches instead of three, and are taller, and the dome is flatter, altogether creating a taller square tower, rather than the previous narrow octagonal one. Despite the relocation and reconstruction, the church is listed as "the earliest surviving church in Victoria, and one of Melbourne's earliest surviving buildings".

== See also ==
- List of cathedrals in Australia
