= Jane Macartney =

Philanthropist, religious worker and teacher

- Born: Jane Hardman; 19 January 1803; Castle Bellingham, Ireland
- Died: January 10, 1885 (aged 81); The Deanery, East Melbourne, Australia
- Occupations: Philanthropist, wife of the Dean
- Known for: Establishing and managing charitable institutions, visiting and assisting less privileged families, teaching in Sunday Schools

Jane Macartney (born Jane Hardman; 19 January 1803 – 10 January 1885) was an Australian philanthropist, religious worker and teacher in Melbourne and surrounding regions in the 1800s. An Irish member of the Church of England, in 1833 she married Hussey Macartney, later to become the dean of St James' Cathedral in Melbourne. Her position as wife of the dean enabled her to help establish the Orphan Asylum, the Carlton Refuge, the Melbourne Home and the Lying-In Hospital, along with Frances Perry, the wife of Bishop Charles Perry. Her work in Melbourne was a continuation of her earlier charitable works in Ireland and regional Victoria, where she set up and taught in girls' Sunday Schools and visited poor families, especially assisting young mothers.

== Personal life and religion ==
Jane Macartney was born Jane Hardman at Castle Bellingham in Ireland, daughter of Edward Hardman an Irish parliamentarian and Rebecca M'Clintock. As a young women, she became a Christian and a member of the Church of Ireland and began her lifelong ministry of establishing schools, charitable institutions and visiting underprivileged families. Her later diaries written in Victoria, Australia, show she was a woman of faith and daily prayer believing her calling was to minister to mothers and poor families. She often attended the regular prayer meetings held on a Saturday in the country parishes and woke up early on weekdays in Melbourne for personal prayer.

She married a cleric, Hussey Burgh Macartney, the son of Sir John Macartney, member of the Irish House of Commons and Lady Macartney, in March 1833 at St Peter's Church, Dublin, and moved with him to a remote and poor area of Ireland where she lived with her mother-in-law, widowed sister-in-law and two nephews. In 1843, after the death of her mother-in-law, and her sister-in-law with two sons had left the household, Jane and Hussey Macartney moved to a parish near Dublin. While in Dublin, they decided to emigrate with their eight children to Melbourne, Australia, then known as Port Phillip. On 23 January 1848, the family arrived on the ship "The Stag" in Port Phillip Bay with Bishop Charles Perry and his wife Frances Perry, the Reverend Mr Newham and his wife and child and the Reverend Mr Hales and his wife. The care and support given to each other on the voyage led to a long friendship between Frances and Jane and their partnership in charitable work. The Macartney's religious affiliation was described in 2008 as "Irish evangelicals who were about as low church as one could get, in liturgy, doctrine and manners."

After their arrival in Melbourne, Hussey Macartney was subsequently appointed by Bishop Perry to churches at Moonee Ponds, Heidelberg and Geelong, becoming Archdeacon of Geelong in October 1848 then Dean of Melbourne and St James Cathedral in 1852 and Archdeacon in 1857. In November, 1864, Jane and the family sailed to Europe and were given 300 sovereigns on their departure. They returned to Melbourne in August, 1866. Dean Hussey Macartney administered the diocese several times when the Bishop was on leave.

=== Faith, works and funds ===
The Macartneys were regarded as being from the Irish upper middle class but their evangelical Church of England faith led to them redistributing some of their funds to less privileged families and individuals combined with efforts for their moral and religious improvement. The minutes of Melbourne's charitable institutions show that Jane Macartney donated funds as an individual (usually Mrs Macartney) and the Dean donated separately in his name, so it seems Jane Macartney had control of her own funds. On 5 August 1848, the Museum of the Royal Dublin Society recorded that Mrs Hussey Burgh Macartney of Melbourne also donated a preserved albatross. Jane and her family moved into the newly built Deanery in 1869 at 188 Hotham Street East Melbourne, next to Bishopscourt where Bishop Perry and his wife, Frances lived. The Deanery was a large nine-room single storey stone house with French windows leading to a return verandah and a sweeping garden. The Dean was also a landowner, buying large blocks in Hallam and Kew, although some of the land seems to have been bought for future church use rather than for the family.

=== Visiting and hospitality ===
One of Jane Macartney's main occupations was visiting other women. These were not purely social visits but part of her volunteer and philanthropic work. She made district visits to parishioners when in regional areas in both Ireland and Victoria; visited clergy wives in the Melbourne diocese to encourage and support them, and when they were sick, bereaved or had given birth; and visited the residents of various charitable institutions, especially young mothers in the Carlton Refuge or Lying-in Hospital. There are instances of the clergy wife dying so she visited and comforted the husband and family. She worked in partnership with her husband, the Dean, so she hosted clergy meetings and social events in their home, including hosting Sydney visitors for overnight stays and often welcoming people to luncheon and dinner. The Bishop and Dean of Sydney were guests as well as new clergy to the diocese and their wives. Her social status allowed her to employ cooks and housekeepers to keep the home running. She often used public transport—omnibuses, trains and trams—and sometimes walked in Melbourne and its suburbs. Sometimes she was able to use her family's wagonette or buggy and "Mrs Perry" gave her lifts in her carriage to committee meetings. She was known for her energy and strength into her old age in getting around Melbourne. She wrote more about her husband's ailments in her diary than her own illnesses. When she stayed home she spent her time sewing, writing letters, managing the household, walking in the garden with her youngest child, "Franny" or preparing bundles of clothes for jumble sales or to send to needy families.

== Ministry ==
=== Schools and Sunday schools ===
In Ireland as a single young woman, Jane Hardman helped establish a girls' school in a nearby underprivileged area. With friends she raised funds to build the school house and provide a wage for additional teachers. She taught at the school and visited poorer families. After her marriage and move to the remote Irish countryside, Macartney continued to visit and assist poor families, travelling by boat and carriage and also welcomed people to her house when they came for medicine and advice. When Hussey was minister in several parishes in regional Victoria, she taught in Sunday schools, sometimes twice on one Sunday when there were two full church services led by her husband. The Sunday school movement began in the late 1790s in the UK before the introduction of universal state-funded primary schools, as a way of educating children who worked or whose parents were too poor to send them to grammar schools. Sunday schools taught literacy and numeracy as well as religion and morals. The Church of England, Presbyterians and Methodists were the leaders in providing Sunday schools in Victoria at the time.

=== Lying-in Hospital ===
Jane helped Frances Perry establish the Melbourne Lying-in Hospital (named Melbourne Lying-in Hospital and Infirmary for Diseases of Women and Children), the first maternity hospital for underprivileged women in Australia (now the Royal Women's Hospital, Melbourne). Frances was co-founder and President, while Jane was one of twenty women on the planning committee. Two doctors, John Maund and Richard Tracy were aiming to rent a house in Albert Street, East Melbourne for a maternity hospital. The women's committee joined them, raised the funds, established and managed the hospital. The first patient was admitted on 19 August 1856. The women's management committee at first met weekly, admitted patients, appointed staff and negotiated contracts with builders and suppliers. Jane was only able to be on the committee for a year (1856–57) as she had to commit her time to other institutions.

=== Carlton Women's Refuge ===
The first planning meeting for the Carlton Women's Refuge was held in Jane's drawing room. The refuge began as a place of reform for prostitutes in 1854 then by 1860 became a refuge for young unmarried mothers and their children. Although the refuge was established by Protestants, it accepted young women of any denomination and had a non-denominational chapel in the grounds. The historical records show that the refuge tried to help unmarried mothers find work and keep their babies if possible. One memoir of the refuge stated, "The great desire of the committee is to keep mother and child together, and so to develop the maternal instinct". She stayed on the committee of the refuge until her last illness.

=== Orphan Asylum and the Melbourne Home ===
Macartney helped establish the Orphan Asylum (formerly St. James' Orphan Asylum) and the Melbourne Home (aka The Governesses' Institute and Melbourne Home) which opened in Melbourne in 1863 as a hostel and employment registry for governesses, shop women, needlewomen and servants (formerly the Melbourne Female Home, opened in 1857 for newly arrived single female immigrants ). She and her daughters assisted in the work of the Melbourne Home and visited regularly at the Benevolent Asylum and Melbourne Lying-in Hospital. She does not seem to have been on the committee of the Benevolent Asylum, an institution for destitute men, women and children, but she visited there and donated to it £1 9/- 2d (one pound, nine shillings and tuppence).

By 1856, Macartney was on the Ladies Committee of the Melbourne Orphan Asylum with Mrs Perry as president. Bishop Perry was president of the Gentleman's Committee and the dean was a member of it. The Ladies Committee managed the day-to-day running of and admissions to the asylum while the Gentleman's Committee, formed in 1854, were trustees of the property and took care of business matters. It was the first organisation in Victoria managed by both women and men and the two committees merged by 1877. The asylum was run on Protestant Christian principles, but accepted children of all religions and nationalities. Children were free to leave and could live with extended family if they had any, but they usually stayed and were trained and apprenticed as gardeners, carpenters, domestic servants by the time they 14 years old. The ladies committee followed up the girls in their placements.

The connection between the committees of the Benevolent Asylum, the Lying-In Hospital and the Orphan Asylum is revealed by the decision of the Benevolent Asylum committee to eventually stop accepting admissions of children and women about to give birth as the Lying-In Hospital and Orphan Asylum had been established. First, the acceptance of "Lying-in cases" was ceased then the committees agreed the Benevolent Asylum would accommodate its last group of children until the Orphan Asylum was opened. The children were then sent there to live and learn a trade.

== Last year and death ==
Macartney finally had to give up visiting in the last year of her life. She wrote of her disappointment in her last diary entries in September 1884 at not being able to go out, only able to stay in bed or go as far as her garden. She died at 82 years old in the deanery on 10 January 1885. The writer of one of her obituaries described her as having "uncommon energy" and "The only question, when drawn in different directions, was which should be attended to, of apparently conflicting duties; but on went the unceasing effort for the glory of God and the welfare of her fellow-creatures."
