= William Street, Melbourne =

Street in Melbourne, Victoria

Coordinates: 37.813°S 144.957°E

William Street Victoria
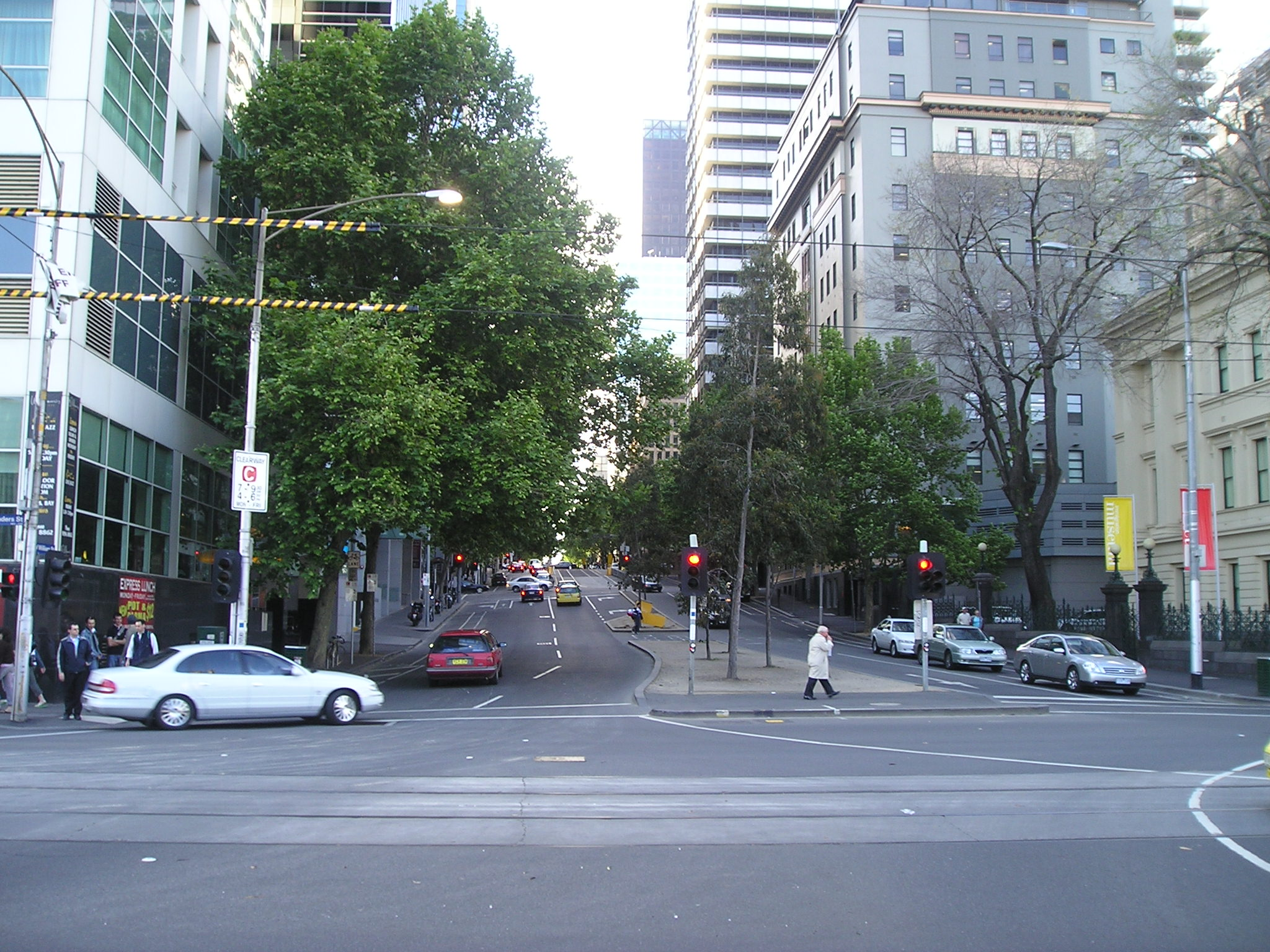
- William Street facing north from Flinders Street

General information
- Type: Street
- Length: 1.7 km (1.1 mi)

Major junctions
- North end: Peel Street; North Melbourne
- Dudley Street; La Trobe Street; Lonsdale Street; Bourke Street; Collins Street; Flinders Street
- South end: Queensbridge Street; Melbourne CBD

Location(s)
- Suburb(s): North Melbourne, Melbourne CBD

William Street is a major street in the Melbourne central business district, Victoria, Australia. It runs roughly north–south from Flinders Street to Victoria Street, and was laid out in 1837 as part of the original Hoddle Grid. The street is located in-between King Street and Queen Street.

William Street is named after William IV, who was the reigning monarch when the street was laid out. Notable landmarks on William Street include the Queen Victoria Market, the Flagstaff Gardens, Immigration Museum, Supreme Court of Victoria, AMP Square, Australian Club, Swann House and 140 William Street.

== History ==
=== 2007 shooting incident ===
On 18 June 2007, a shooting incident occurred on the corner of Flinders Lane and William Street when an unknown man shot and killed a pedestrian and wounded two others. Christopher Hudson later pleaded guilty to the shootings.

=== 2017 car attack ===
On 20 January 2017, a car was driven into pedestrians in the central business district of Melbourne, killing 5 and injuring over 20. The driver was stopped when police shot him in the arm and subsequently pulled him from his vehicle on William Street (at the corner of Bourke Street).

== Notable buildings ==
Several buildings and structures on William Street are listed on the Victorian Heritage Register and/or classified by the National Trust of Australia. These include:

- 140 William Street
- Australian Club Building
- Court of Appeal
- Goldsborough Mort Building
- Hume House
- Prometheus Mural in Monash House
- Queensland Building
- Royal Melbourne Mint (former)
- Royal Standard Hotel
- Scottish House
- Shell Corner (former)
- Supreme Court of Victoria
- Western House

== Law Courts precinct ==
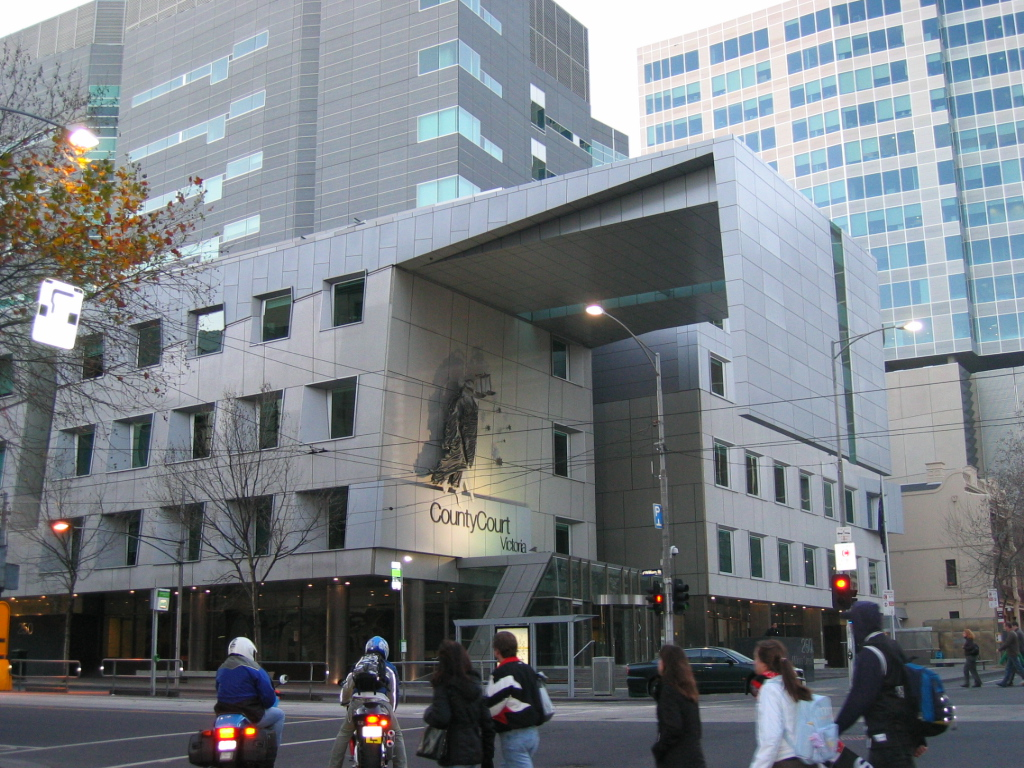
County Court of Victoria, corner of Lonsdale Street

William Street's junction with Lonsdale Street forms the legal precinct of Melbourne. This junction is the location of the Supreme Court of Victoria, Melbourne Magistrates' Court and County Court. The Federal Court building, housing the High Court and other Federal courts, is located one block further north on the corner of William Street and La Trobe Street. The Law Institute of Victoria is located one block south of Lonsdale Street at the corner of Bourke Street.

== Transport ==
Flagstaff railway station is situated on William Street. Besides that, William Street is also served by a tram route. Tram route 58 runs along William Street between Peel Street and Flinders Lane.
