= George Vance =

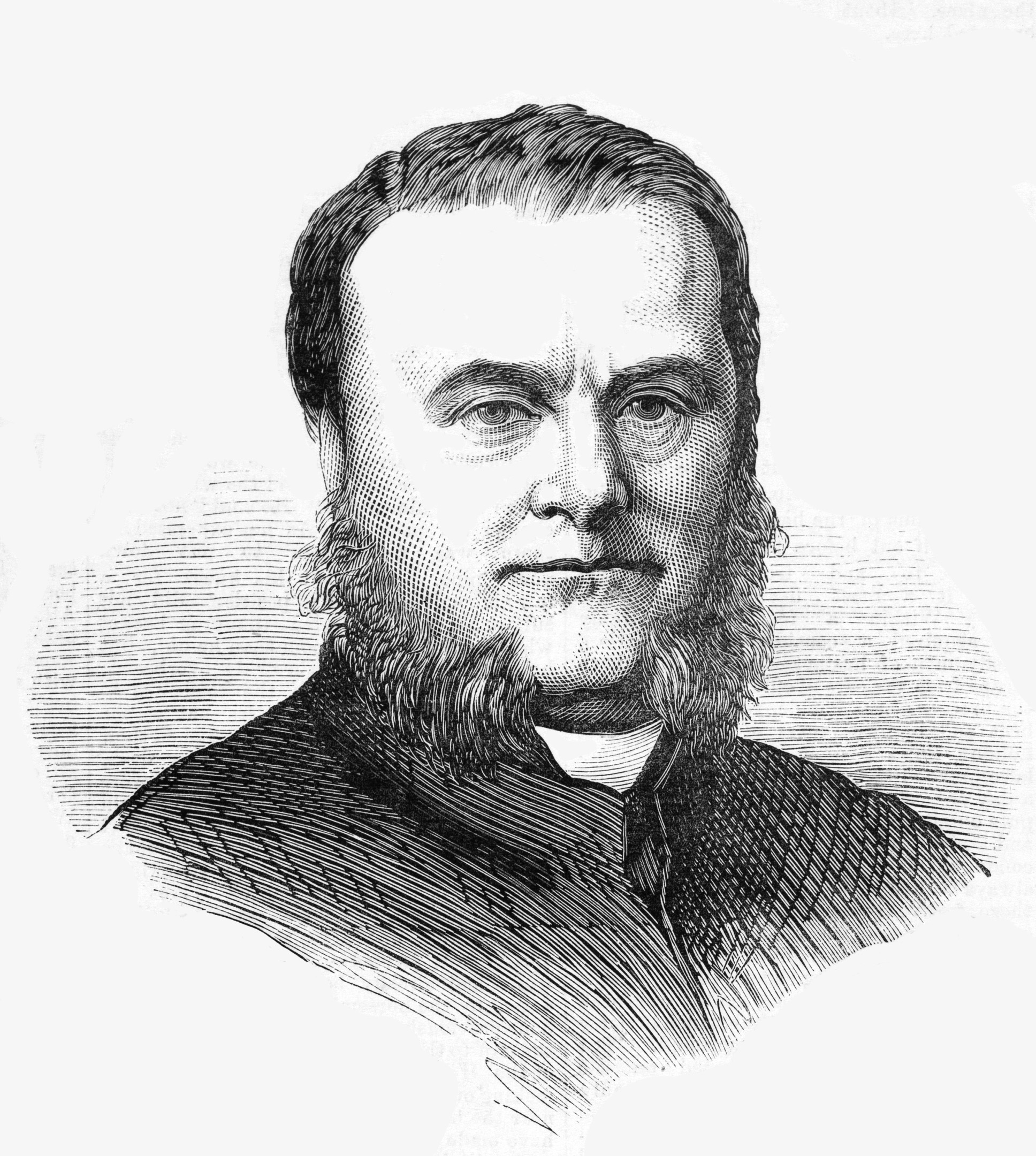
George Vance, 1875 engraving

George Oakley Vance (25 May 1828 – 1910) was the Dean of Melbourne from 1894 until his death.

The son of William Ford Vance, who had been the vicar of Coseley, Vance was born in London and educated at King's College School, London and Lincoln College, Oxford. Emigrating to Australia he was ordained by Charles Perry, Bishop of Melbourne, in 1854. After curacies in Melbourne and Geelong he was appointed headmaster of Geelong Grammar School. He then held incumbencies in Chewton, Kyneton, Richmond and Kew.

Religious titles
Preceded by Hussey Macartney	Dean of Melbourne; 1894–1910	Succeeded by Reginald Stephen
