= Hussey Macartney =

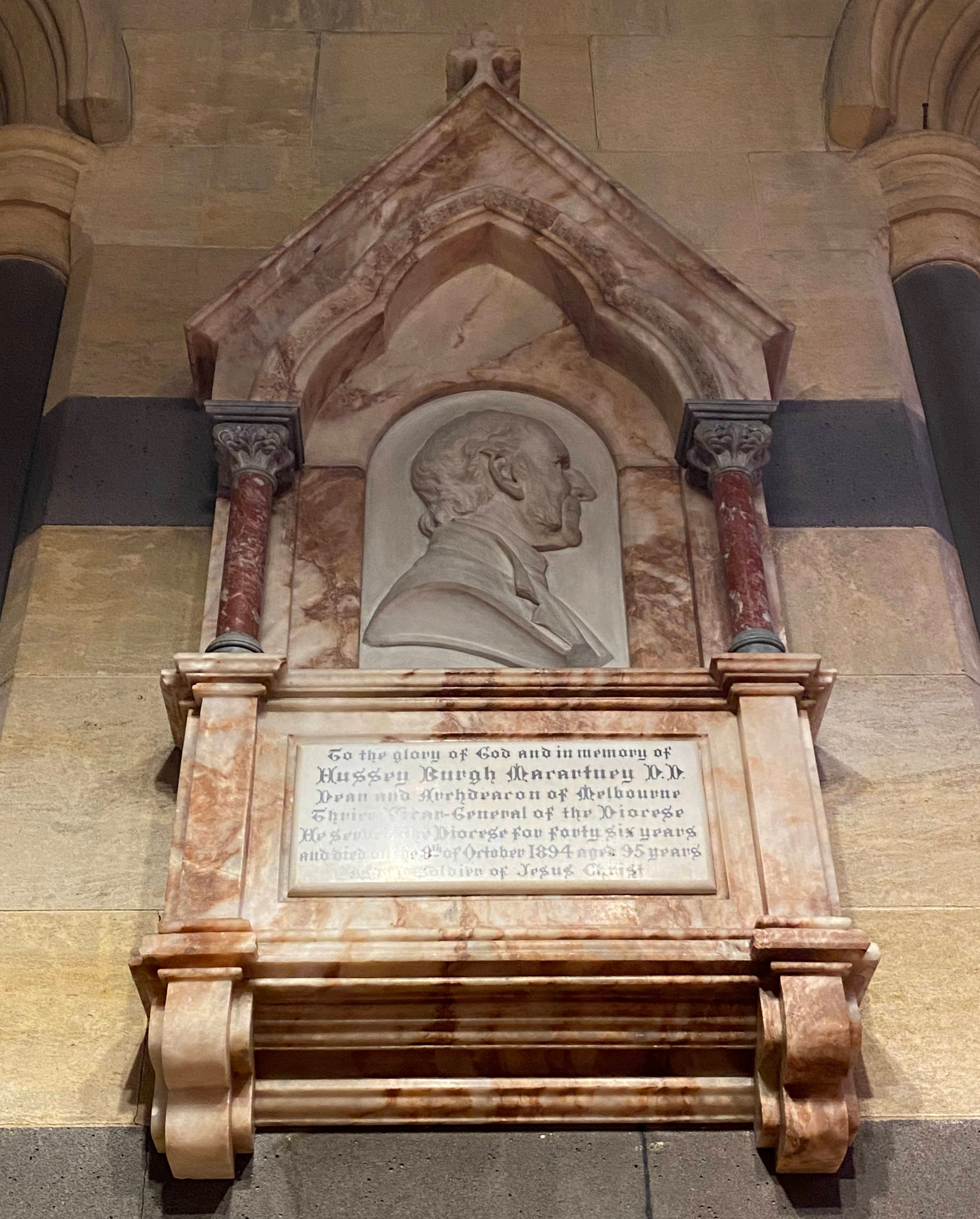
Memorial in St Paul's Cathedral

Hussey Burgh Macartney (10 April 1799 – 8 October 1894) was the inaugural Dean of Melbourne from 1852 until his death.

The son of Sir John Macartney, 1st Baronet, and his second wife Catherine Burgh (daughter of the judge Walter Hussey Burgh), he was born in Dublin, Ireland, and educated at Trinity College. He was ordained in 1823 and was a curate in Banagher, Killoe and Killashee. After this he held incumbencies at Creagh and Kilcock. In 1847 he sailed to Australia with Charles Perry, the first Bishop of Melbourne. Perry made him Archdeacon of Geelong in 1848 and Dean of Melbourne’s new cathedral, St James, four years later. St James was the Anglican cathedral church until St Paul's Cathedral was consecrated in 1891.

In regard to the colonisation of Australia, Macartney was quoted as saying that Aboriginal people "were not the rightful owners of the soil" and had "not been unjustly dispossessed by the white man".

Macartney was married to Jane Macartney (née Hardman) who helped establish and manage various charitable institutions in Melbourne, often with Bishop Charles Perry's wife, Frances Perry. Macartney died in East Melbourne on 9 October 1894.

Religious titles
Preceded by Inaugural appointment	Dean of Melbourne; 1852–1894	Succeeded by George Oakley Vance
