= Swann House =

Historic office building in Melbourne, Australia

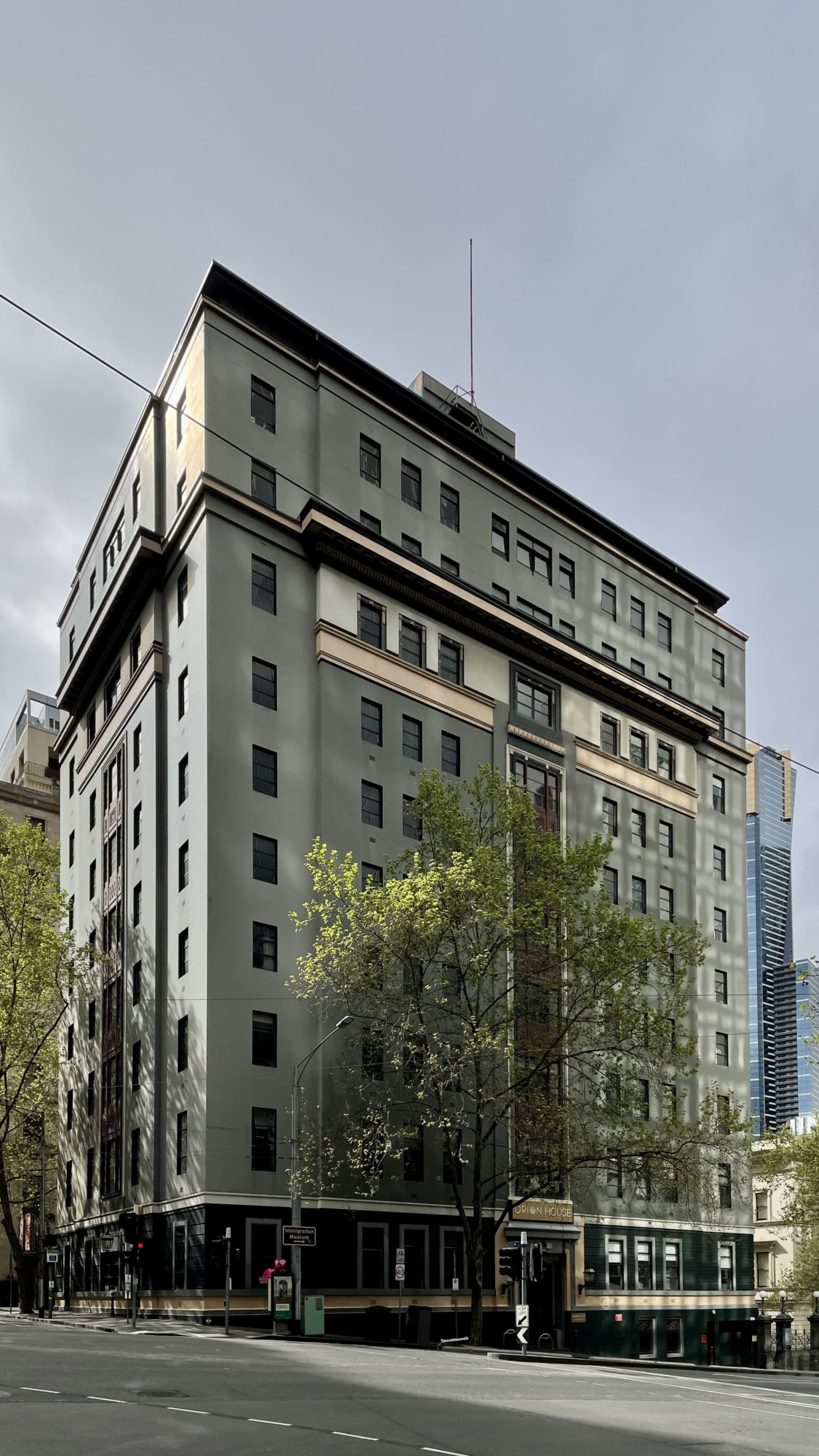
Swann House in 2021 - note Orion signage above the door.

Swann House is a historic office building located at 22 William Street in the Central Business District of Melbourne, Australia.

== History ==
It was built in 1921-2 as headquarters for the newly formed for the State Electricity Commission of Victoria, which was established to develop electricity infrastructure based on the brown coal reserves of the Latrobe valley. The site, behind the grand Victorian era Custom House, was where John Pascoe Fawkner's built his first house in 1835. It was designed by the Commission's architect Alfred Romeo La Gerche employing "severe simplicity", with Egyptian and Greek detailing, also described as "commercial palazzo form with restrained Greek Revival detailing". It was constructed entirely of reinforced concrete and cos £82,000. The construction firm was Hansen & Yuncken.

Two decades later, in 1948–1949, two more floors were added at the top of the building. As such it is now twelve stories, 44.03 metres (144.5 ft) in height. At some point it was named Swann House, and renamed Lyle House.

In 2014 it was purchased by the Orion Group, and renamed Orion House. In 2019 it was sold to the Fidinam Group, then on-sold in 2020 to Coweley William, who were granted a permit for a refurbishment which includes an extension in the rear corner. The works commenced in 2024.
