= King Street, Melbourne =

Street in Melbourne

Coordinates: 37.8122°S 144.9538°E

King Street Victoria
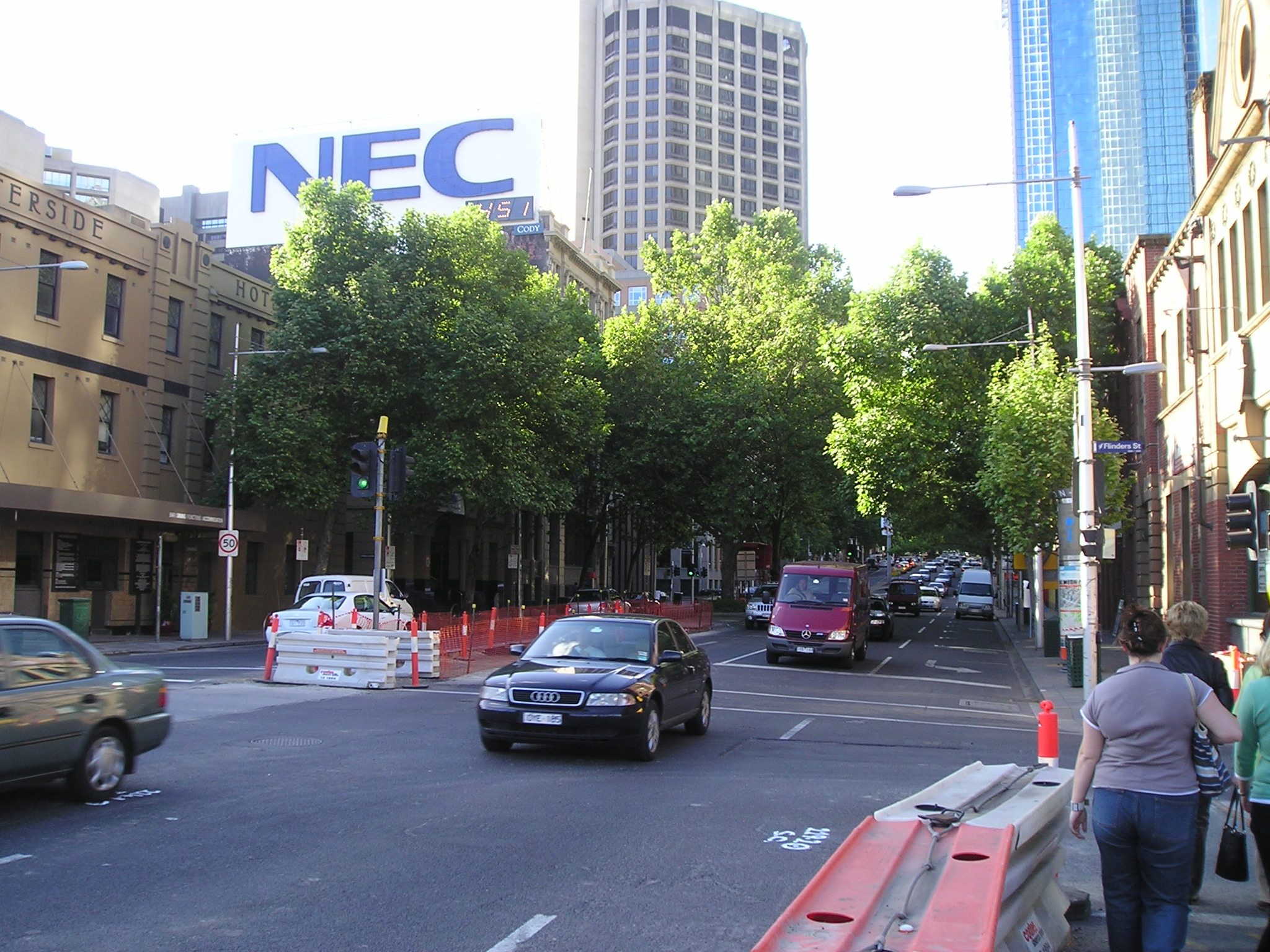
- King Street, facing north from Flinders Street

General information
- Type: Street
- Length: 2 km (1.2 mi)
- Route number(s): Metro Route 60 (2013–present); Entire route
- Former route number: National Route 79 (1988–2013); Entire route; National Route 1 (1955–1988); Entire route

Major junctions
- North end: Curzon Street; North Melbourne
- Victoria Street; Dudley Street; La Trobe Street; Lonsdale Street; Bourke Street; Collins Street; Flinders Street
- South end: Kings Way; Southbank, Melbourne

Location(s)
- Suburb(s): Melbourne CBD

King Street is a main road in the Melbourne central business district, Australia. It is considered a key hub of Melbourne's nightlife and is home to many pubs, nightclubs, restaurants, and adult entertainment venues.

Part of the original Hoddle Grid laid out in 1837, the road has become a main traffic thoroughfare connecting Southbank and North Melbourne through the city centre. King Street is named for Captain Philip Gidley King, the third Governor of New South Wales.

== Geography ==
King Street begins at Flinders Street and ends at the intersection of Hawke Street and Victoria Street in West Melbourne. Towards the northern end of King Street lay the Flagstaff Gardens, whilst the Sea Life Melbourne Aquarium and Crown Casino are at its southern tip. King Street becomes Kings Way south of Flinders Street.

The street was part of National Routes 1 and 79 until the city bypass road linking the Monash Freeway with the West Gate Freeway was completed. Crossing through Melbourne's main financial district, many of Melbourne's tallest office towers line King Street. The area was once lined with bluestone warehouses, some of which still exist to the present day.

== Notable buildings ==
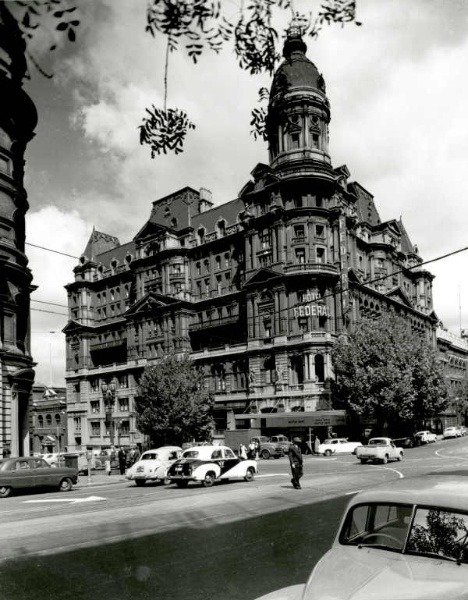
The demolished Federal Coffee Palace stood on the corner of Collins Street and King Street.

The street has many examples of modern architecture, some designed by Yuncken Freeman who also had their offices located on the street. Many King Street buildings are listed on the Victorian Heritage Register and/or classified by the National Trust of Australia, including:

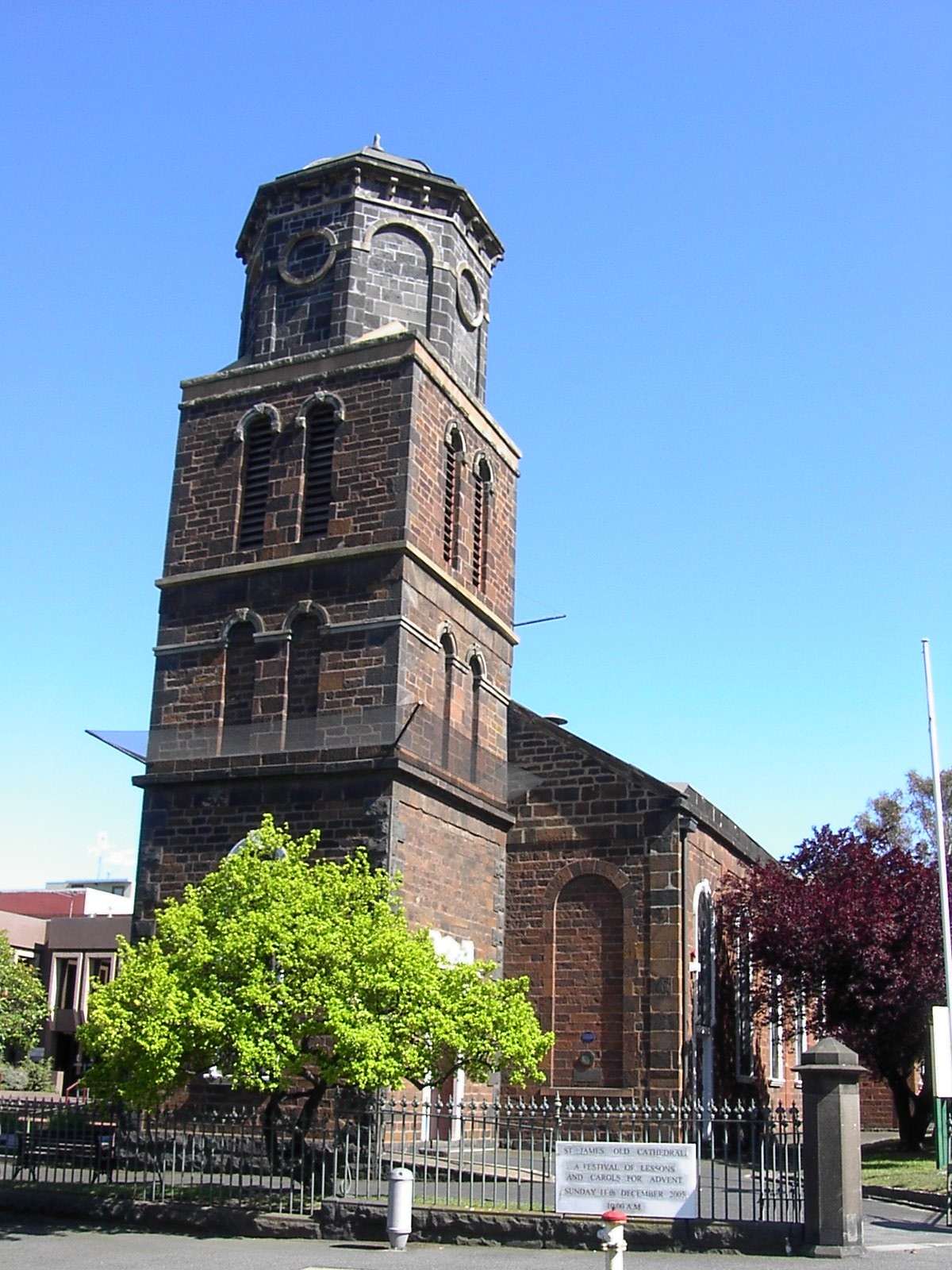
St James Old Cathedral

- St James Old Cathedral, the oldest church in Melbourne (1847)
- 328-330 King Street, the oldest residence in Melbourne (1850)
- Former York Butter Factory (1852)
- Former F. Blight & Company Warehouse, currently Colonial Hotel (1853)
- Former Zanders No 3 Warehouse (1854)
- Former Levicks & Piper Wholesale Ironmongers Warehouse (1859)
- Former Phoenix Clothing Company (1859)
- Langdon Building (1863)
- New Zealand Mercantile building (1909)
- Former Melbourne Wool Exchange, currently Australian Institute of Music City Campus (1913)

Other prominent buildings include:

- Great Western Hotel, a pub continuously operating for 150 years (1864)
- Rialto Towers, formerly Melbourne's tallest building (1986)
- The Melbourne Stock Exchange (1990)
- Victoria University's City King St campus

As with many of Melbourne's streets, several notable heritage buildings were demolished during the 1950s, 1960s and 1970s, including:

- The Federal Coffee Palace (1888, demolished 1972)
- Robb's Buildings (1885, demolished 1985)

== Adult entertainment district ==
During the 1980s many former warehouses at the southern end of King Street (and in nearby Flinders Street) were converted into night clubs.

King Street subsequently became Melbourne's main nightclub district, with some of Melbourne's largest clubs including Clique Lounge Bar, Tramp, Inflation, La Di Da, Brown Alley & Sorry Grandma along the strip.

The street is also considered the hub of Melbourne's adult entertainment venues, including Goldfingers, The Men's Gallery, Dallas Dancers, Bar 20, Centrefold Lounge and Spearmint Rhino.

== Events ==
- The collapse of the new King Street Bridge on 10 July 1962
