= Flagstaff Gardens =

Public gardens in Melbourne, Victoria, Australia

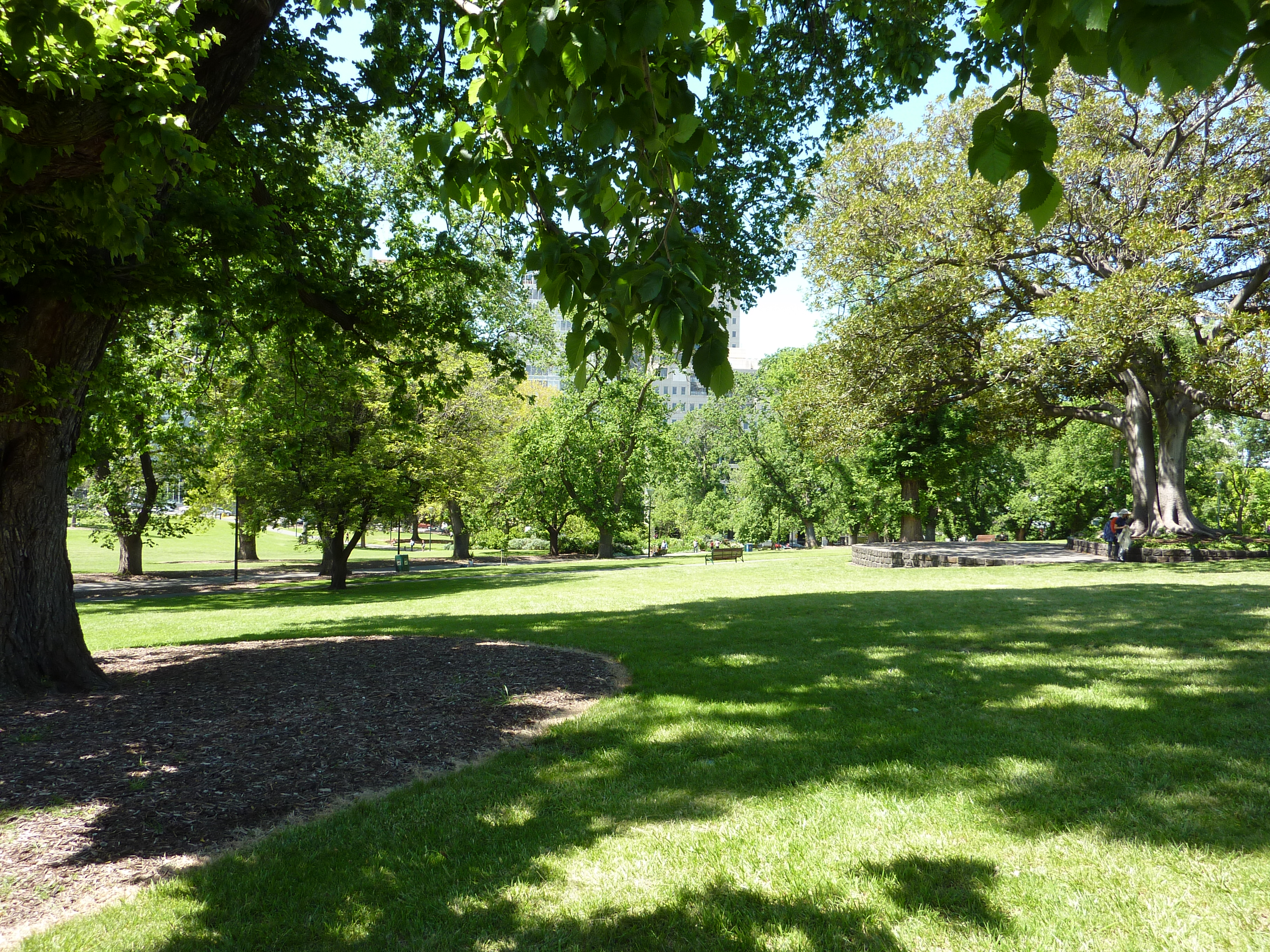
- The gardens in 2010

- Location within Melbourne
- Interactive map of Flagstaff Gardens
- Type: Urban park
- Location: Melbourne, Victoria, Australia
- Coordinates: 37°48′38″S 144°57′16″E
- Area: 7.2 ha (18 acres)
- Designated: 1873 (as a reserve)
- Opened: 1862; 164 years ago
- Designer: Clement Hodgkinson; John Guilfoyle; Paul Raphael Montford (sculpture 1950)
- Owner: Government of Victoria (as Crown land)
- Operator: City of Melbourne
- Visitors: c. 1.64 million (in 2000)
- Open: All year
- Status: Open
- Paths: Sealed
- Terrain: Flat
- Vegetation: Australian natives; lawns; European gardens
- Species: Eucalyptus; Moreton Bay figs; Elms
- Public transit: – Flagstaff; –,, –
- Landmarks: Pioneer Memorial (1871); Separation Memorial (1950)
- Facilities: Barbecues; drinking fountain; lawn bowls; multi-use courts; picnic facilities; playground; seating; toilets
- Website: melbourne.vic.gov.au

Victorian Heritage Register
- Official name: Flagstaff Gardens
- Type: Registered place
- Designated: 25 March 2004
- Reference no.: H2041
- Heritage overlay no.: HO793
- Categories: Public Art; Parks, Gardens and Trees

Register of the National Estate
- Official name: Flagstaff Gardens
- Type: Defunct register
- Designated: undated
- Reference no.: 100528

The Flagstaff Gardens is a 7.2-hectare (18-acre) urban park located in the city centre of Melbourne, in Victoria, Australia. Established in 1862, and formally reserved in 1873, the gardens are the oldest public park and are one of the most visited parks in the city, accessed by residents, nearby office workers, and tourists.

The gardens are located on the traditional lands of the Boonwurrung and Woiwurrung people, managed as Crown land by the City of Melbourne, bounded by William, La Trobe, King and Dudley streets. On the southeast corner opposite is the entrance to the eponymous Flagstaff railway station. Diagonally opposite stands the Victorian branch of the Royal Mint and on the northeast corner over William Street, is the Queen Victoria Market.

The gardens were added to the Victorian Heritage Register on 25 March 2004 in recognition of their archaeological, horticultural, historical and social significance; and, on unknown dates, were added to the now defunct Register of the National Estate and to a non-statutory list by the Victorian branch of the National Trust.

== Description ==
The park contains extensive lawns with a variety of mature trees, flowerbeds and wild animals including possums. The southern end is characterised by deciduous trees, while the northern end contains mature eucalypts. Avenues of elms shade pathways along with several large Moreton Bay fig trees. The north corner contains a bowling lawn, rose beds, flower and shrub beds. Along William Street there are tennis courts, which also double as volleyball, handball and netball courts. Electric barbecues nearby provides a popular site for office parties in December. Scattered about the lawns and gardens are memorials and sculptures that illuminate some of the social significance of the area.

At the listing ceremony by the Victorian Heritage Council in April 2004, Council Chair Chris Gallagher stated,

This listing ensures the much loved trees, landscaping and other individual features are conserved and protected. But it also means the whole site is recognised as an important place for gaining an insight into our historical, archaeological, aesthetic, horticultural and social heritage.

== History ==
The high ground between William and King Streets was known as Brejerrenywun to the Boonwurrung and Woiwurrung.

With the establishment of Melbourne in 1835, the first deaths in the colony were there buried, in what became colloquially known as Burial Hill, with panoramic views over the Yarra River and Port Phillip. By 1838, the Melbourne cemetery was marked out in what is now the Queen Victoria Market, and burials continued at that location.

The following year, Superintendent Charles La Trobe first included the site as part of the green belt encircling Melbourne which included Batman's Hill, Carlton Gardens, Fitzroy Gardens, Treasury Gardens and the Kings Domain. A flagstaff was erected on the hill in 1840 as part of a signalling system between the town and ships in the Port of Melbourne. The flagstaff proved too small and the following year a 50-foot (15 m) flagstaff was erected. The site was the location for the announcement of the establishment of the Colony of Victoria on 11 November 1850, being its separation from the Colony of New South Wales, resulting in celebrations with a huge bonfire with approximately 5,000 townspeople in attendance. By 1857, the Melbourne cemetery was established and a cutting was excavated to ease the gradient of King Street and created a bluestone retaining wall of the high bank along the western boundary.

Between 1857 and 1863, the site was the location for an observatory and weather station, under the direction of Georg von Neumayer and later, William John Wills, before his appointment to the Burke & Wills expedition. The observatory moved to the Kings Domain when the Melbourne Observatory was established, as iron in the buildings surrounding Flagstaff Hill were affecting Neumayer's magnetic observations. During the 1860s, signalling by flags was superseded by the electrical telegraph, making the flagstaff redundant. Local residents petitioned for the hill to be converted into public gardens or a recreation reserve; proclaimed in 1862.

Clement Hodgkinson prepared a plan for the gardens and directed its implementation; also designing several other gardens and parks adjacent to the Melbourne city centre. A memorial to Melbourne's pioneers erected in 1871 and, under the direction of John Guilfoyle, during the 1890s, a more formal network of paths, lawns, trees and flowerbeds was established.

On 9 October 1917 the City of Melbourne was appointed responsible for the Flagstaff Gardens and one of Melbourne's first children's playgrounds was created in the subsequent year. A monument was built in 1950 on the site of the old flagstaff to mark Victoria's centenary of self-government. On 22 January 2026, the memorial to Melbourne's pioneers was destroyed in the lead-up to Australia Day. The smashed monument was daubed with the words “land back” and “death to Australia” in red paint, along with an inverted red triangle, a symbol associated with the designated terrorist organisation Hamas.

== Gallery ==
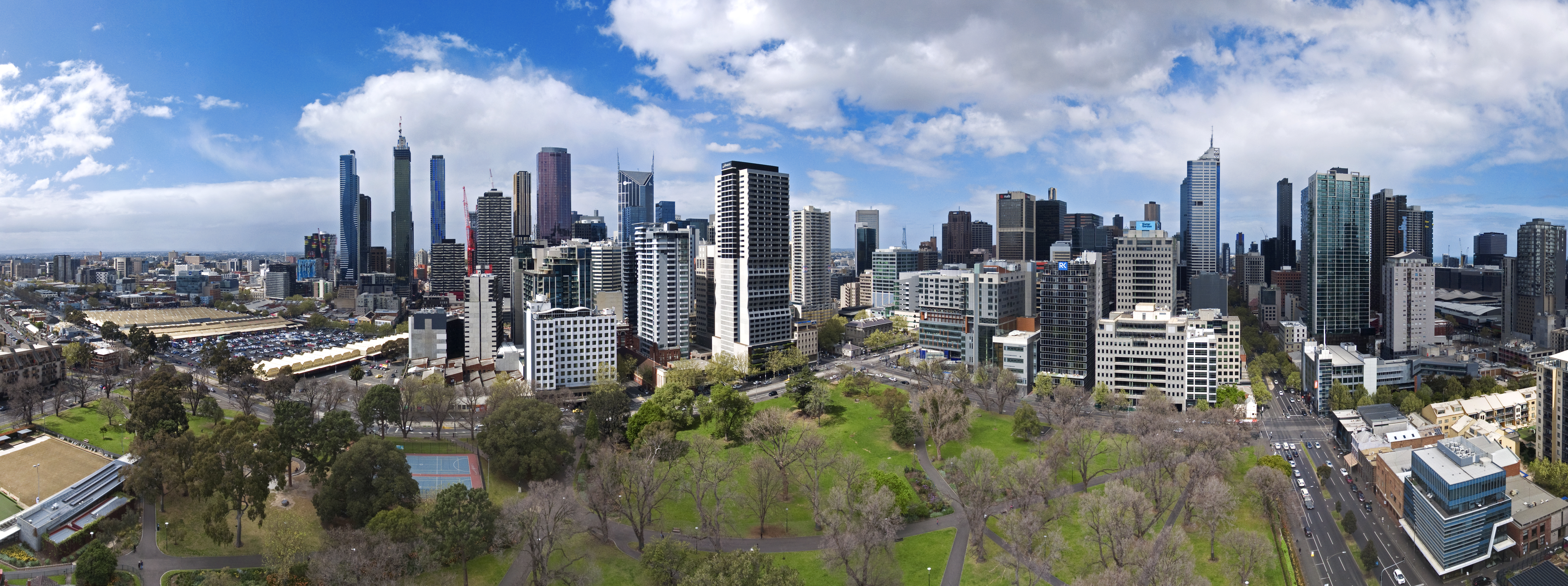
Aerial panorama of Melbourne city taken from Flagstaff Gardens

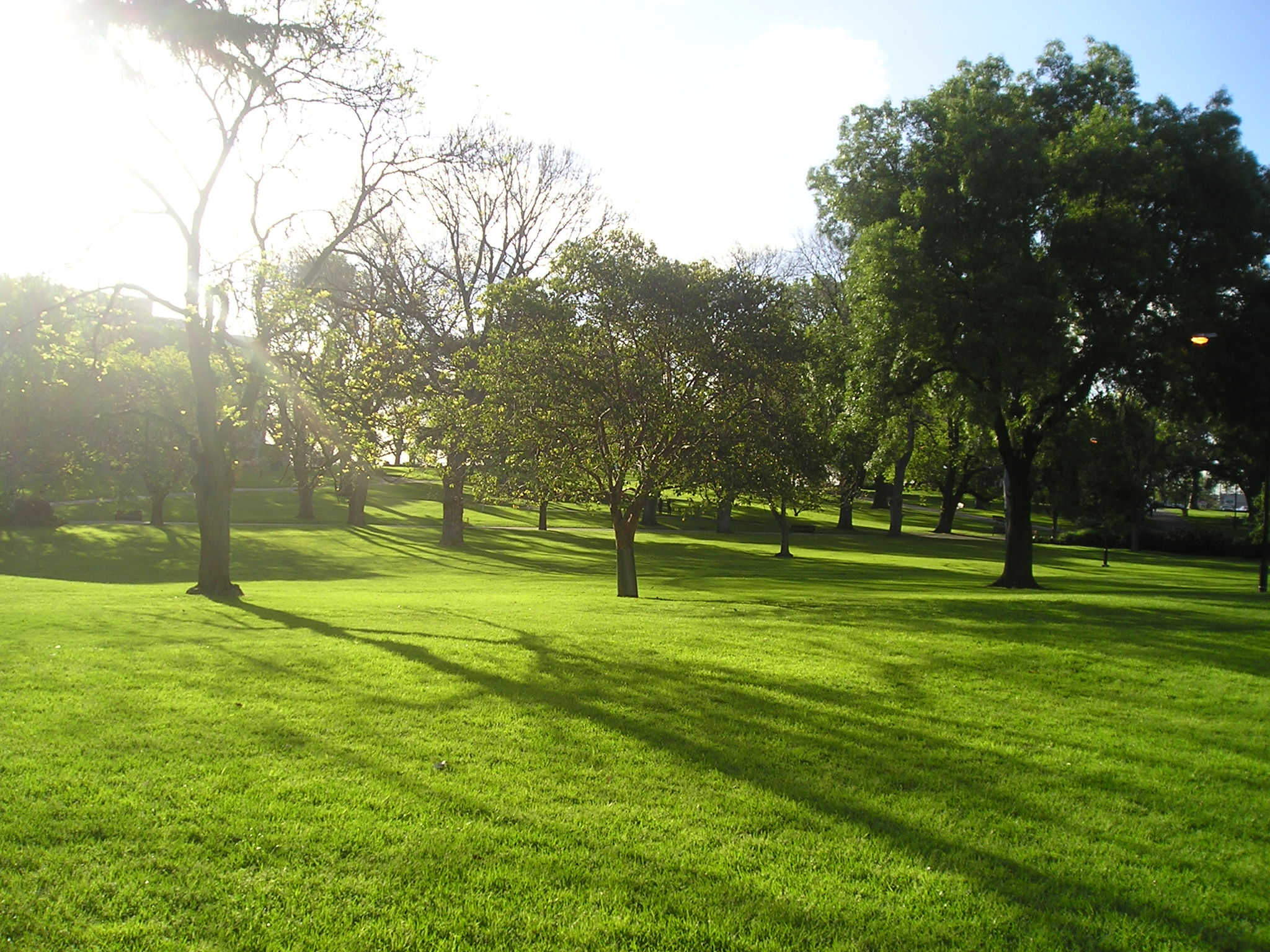
Facing north east in the gardens

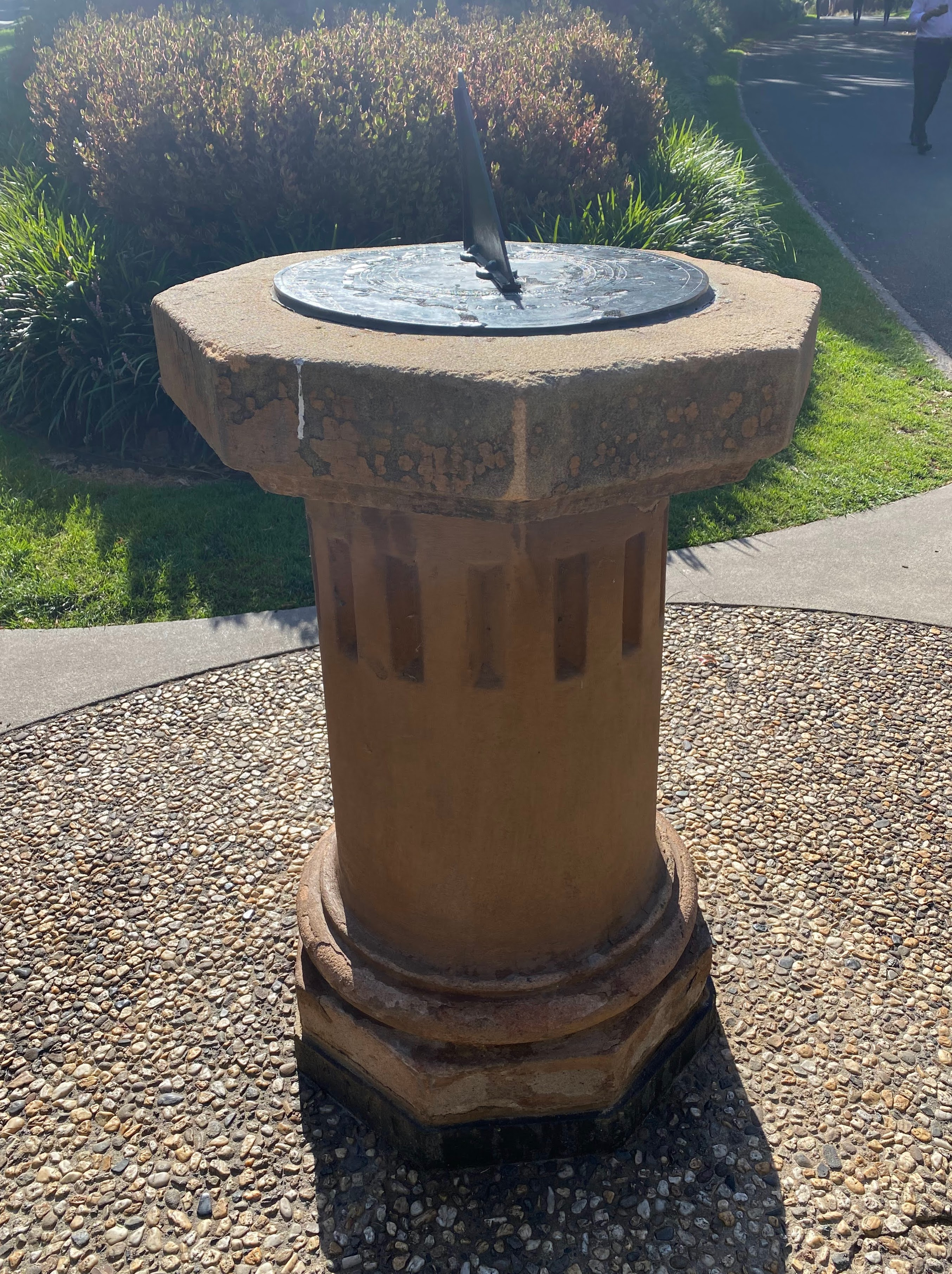
Sundial in the gardens

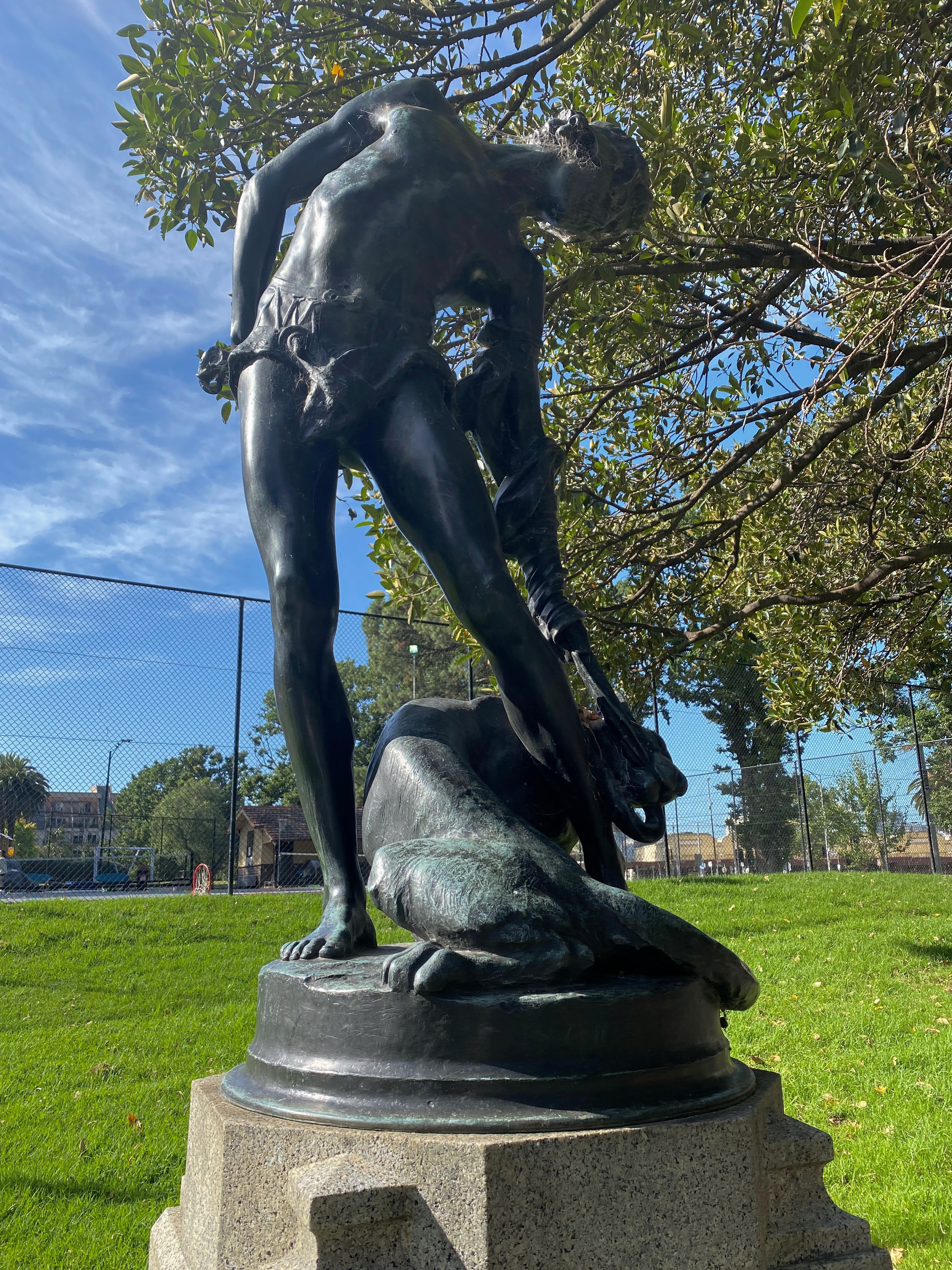
Statue by Paul Raphael Montford

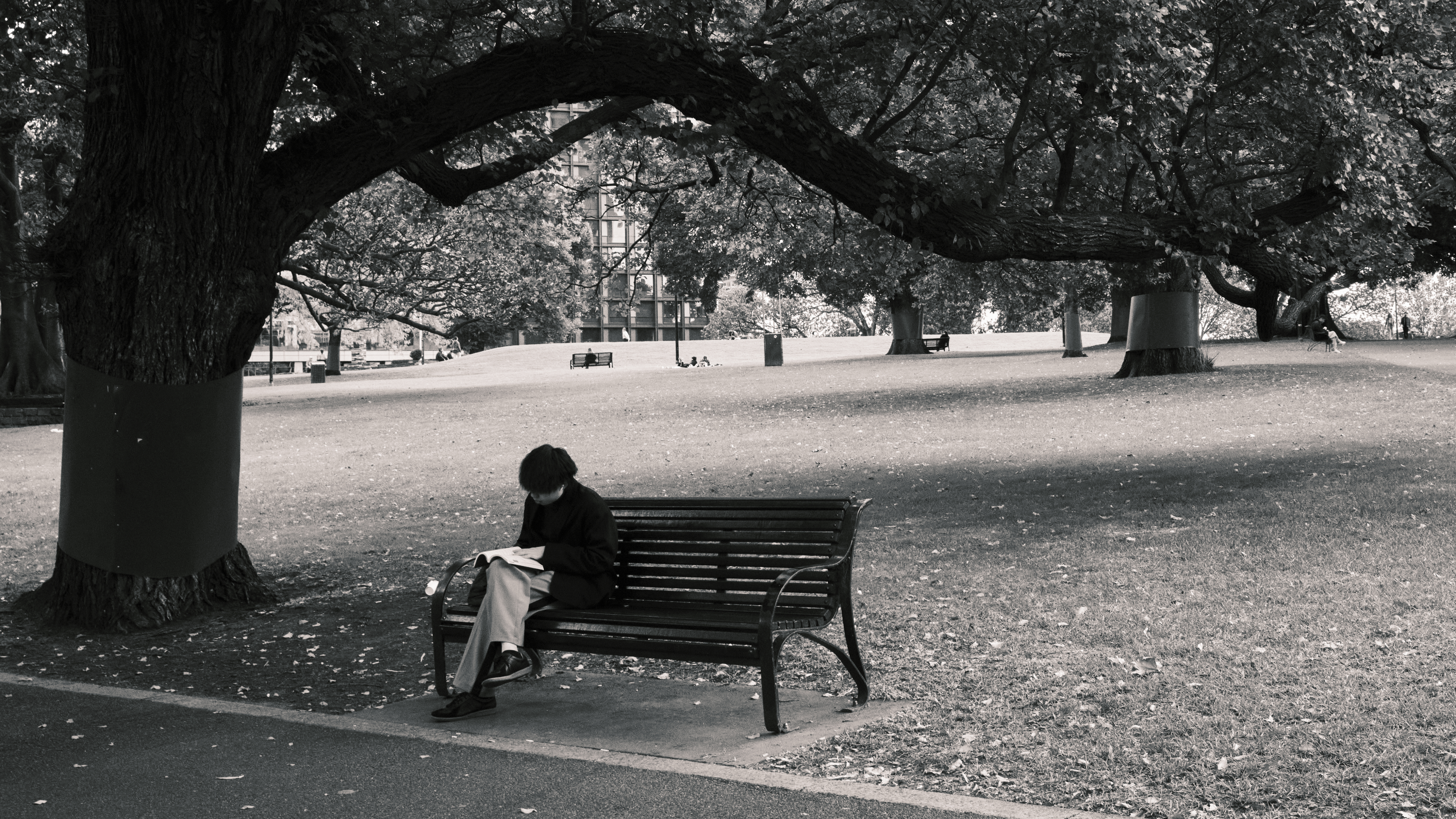
Man reading on a park bench in the Flagstaff Gardens

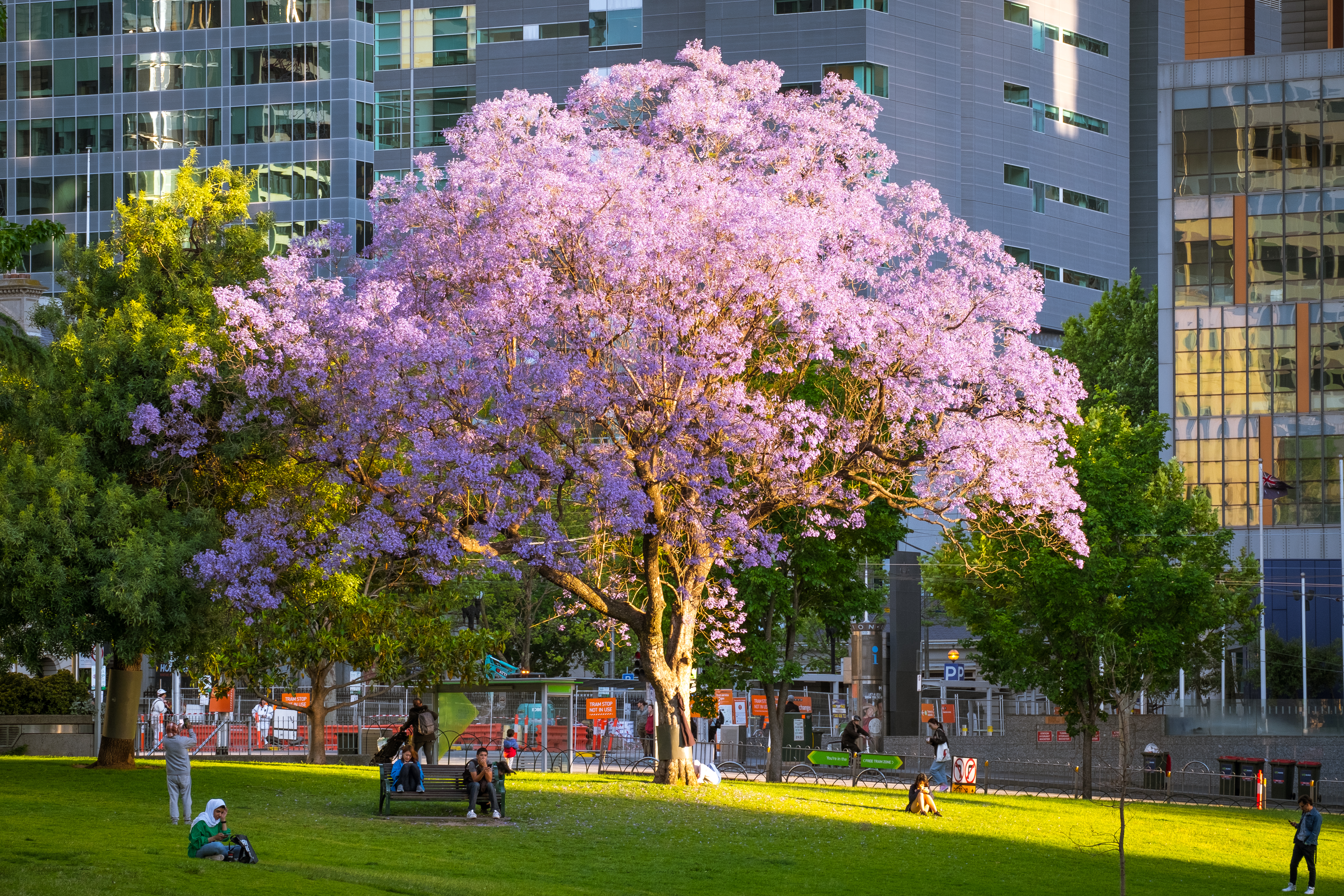
Jacaranda, summer 2019

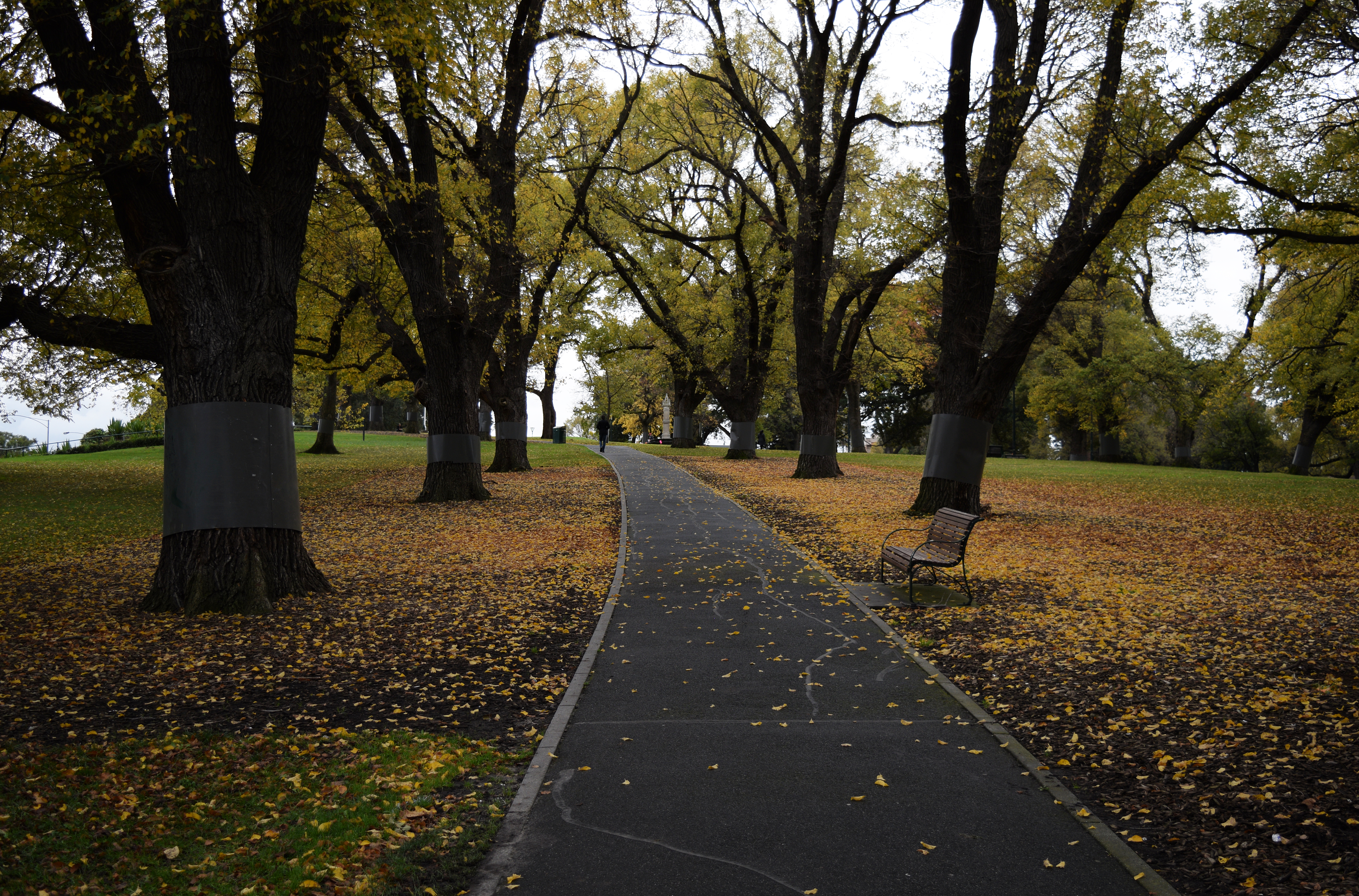
Autumn 2015

== See also ==
- Parks and gardens of Melbourne
- Heritage gardens in Australia
- List of heritage-listed buildings in Melbourne
